= Erie MetroParks =

Park district in Ohio, United States

Erie MetroParks was formed as the "Erie County Metropolitan Park District" in 1968 and adopted its current name in 1991. It consists of 14 individual park areas located throughout Erie County in the US state of Ohio covering approximately 3,200 acres (1,300 ha).

It was organized under the provisions of the Ohio Revised Code, Section 1545, as a separate political division of Ohio. Erie MetroParks is overseen by a Board of Park Commissioners consisting of three members appointed to three-year terms by Judges of the Probate Court and Common Pleas Court of Erie County. Its purpose, according to the statute, is to "preserve, conserve, protect, and enhance the natural and unique historical resources of the park district. Further, to provide opportunities for visitors and residents to use, enjoy, understand and appreciate these resources in a responsible, sustainable manner."

Osborn MetroPark is their flagship park and headquarters. Osborn MetroPark is home to the Roger Johnson Nature Center. The nature center includes educational classrooms, built-in live animal areas, a turtle pond, community space, a play tree, and a window-on-wildlife viewing area, and more. Erie MetroParks has over 30 miles of trails and offers over 300 free programs every year. In 2024, Erie MetroParks celebrated 56 years of conservation and preservation.

"Erie MetroParks mission is to conserve natural resources while connecting the community with nature through education and exploration."

== List of parks and their locations ==
Huron Township

Located between Sandusky and Huron on US 6:

- Osborn MetroPark, 171 acres (69 hectares), the first park developed by Erie MetroParks on the former Osborn State Prison Honor Farm, dedicated in 1975. Picnic shelters, a playground, soccer fields and baseball diamonds are available here along with walking trails and community gardens. The Roger Johnson Nature Center serves as the Park District headquarters. The operation department offices are located at the Maple Grove Center along with the "Erie MetroBark Park," a fenced, off-leash dog exercise area on the Hull Road side of the park.
- East Sandusky Bay Preserve MetroPark, 1,293 acres (523 ha) including:
- Joseph Steinen Wildlife Area, 155 acres (63 ha), purchased in 2003. Includes the official Erie County Ohio Bicentennial Barn, one of 88 barns painted with a special graphic design commemorating the 200th anniversary of Ohio statehood in 2003. A new farm animal park called "The Barnyard" is also located at the Bicentennial Barn. Open, with a primitive nature trail but with public access limited during special youth hunting seasons.
- Putnam Marsh Nature Preserve, 966 acres (391 ha), a protected natural area because of its importance as one of the last undeveloped naturally functioning marshes on the southern Lake Erie shoreline and a critical habitat area for many plants and animals. It was purchased in 2003. Public access is limited.
- Community Foundation Preserve at Eagle Point, 88 acres (36 ha), a wooded area named because it is the location of at least two bald eagle nest sites. Access to this park is restricted during the bald eagle nesting season, but open to the public at all other times.
- Wyandot MetroPark, 158 acres (64 ha), This park was purchased in 2006. It includes several hiking trails and loops, and has an observation deck.
- In addition, Erie MetroParks jointly manages the "East Sandusky Bay Extension", adjacent to the Community Foundation Preserve, the location of the former Sandusky Drive-in theater (torn down in 2007), with the City of Sandusky.

Located South of Huron, along the Huron River:

- DuPont Marsh State Nature Preserve, 113 acres (46 ha), owned by the Ohio Department of Natural Resources (ODNR), and managed by Erie MetroParks.
- Huron River Path MetroPark, 2.4 acres (0.97 ha), a rail trail constructed on an abandoned Wheeling and Lake Erie Railway line. The northern trailhead is in Huron Township and shares its parking lot and entrance with the DuPont Marsh State Nature Preserve.

Perkins Township

A portion of the Putnam Marsh Nature Preserve is located in Perkins Township.

Milan Township

Located north of Milan on State Route 13:

- The Coupling MetroPark, 21 acres (8.5 ha), a combination of sloping and river bottom lands, including a seasonal boat launch on the Huron River; historic railroad freight cars converted to bunk houses and a historic Wheeling and Lake Erie Railway depot from Monroeville, Ohio, equipped with a kitchen and meeting room and available for rent by the public.

Located at the foot of Old Main Street in the Village of Milan:

- Milan Towpath MetroPark, 3.6 acres (1.5 ha), follows the route of the former Milan Canal.

Berlin Township

Located north of Berlin Heights on State Route 61:

- Edison Woods MetroPark, 1,340 acres (540 ha), once slated to become a nuclear power plant, this site is now an important ecological area. It is the largest single park in the Erie MetroParks system with over 7 miles (11 km) of trails. It also contains some of the last old growth forest in Erie County and former farm fields that are being restored to native prairie.

Located South of the Ohio Turnpike on Huff Road:

- Hoffman Forest MetroPark, 40.5 acres (16.4 ha), consists of meadow-to-forest land in succession and mature forest plant communities.

Margaretta Township

Located south-west of Castalia on State Route 101:

- Castalia Quarry MetroPark, 152 acres (62 ha), formerly a limestone quarry, this once barren land is slowly returning to a natural state.

Florence Township

Unincorporated community of Birmingham on State Route 113:

- Birmingham School MetroPark, 3 acres (1.2 ha), a small recreation park with a picnic ground and ball field. The location of the old Birmingham School building, demolished in 1986.

Vermilion, Ohio

Located downtown Vermilion, Ohio on the west bank of the Vermilion River, almost to the very mouth. It is adjacent to Lakefront Park.

- Wakefield MetroPark, 1.5 acres (0.61 ha). It offers passive recreation, hammocks, and water views.
- Thomas Williams MetroPark, 7 acres (2.8 ha). This park offers a place for passive recreation. At this time it is only accessible by residents and staff personnel.
