= Alice Jordan =

Alice Jordan may refer to:

- Alice Mabel Jordan (1870–1960), American librarian
- Alice Blake, née Alice Rufie Jordan (1864–1893), American lawyer, first female graduate of Yale University
- Alice Jordan (Known Space), a fictional character from the Known Space novels by Larry Niven

== See also ==
- Alice Jordan-Baird, Australian politician
