= Berlin Heights =

Berlin Heights may refer to:

- Berlin Heights, New Jersey
- Berlin Heights, Ohio
