= Norwalk High School (Ohio) =

Public, coeducational high school in Norwalk, Ohio, United States

Location
- 350 Shady Lane Drive; Norwalk, (Huron County), Ohio 44857; United States; 41°13′34″N 82°36′39″W

Information
- Type: Public, Coeducational high school
- Established: 1857
- School district: Norwalk City Schools
- Superintendent: Brad Cooley
- Principal: Patrick Kania
- Teaching staff: 37.30 (FTE)
- Grades: 9-12
- Student to teacher ratio: 19.62
- Colors: Blue and Gold
- Fight song: Our Director March
- Athletics conference: Northern Ohio Conference
- Team name: Truckers
- Accreditation: North Central Association of Colleges and Schools
- Newspaper: Trucker Imprint
- Yearbook: Signal
- Athletic Director: Josh Schlotterer
- Website: District websites

Norwalk High School is a public high school in Norwalk, Ohio. It is the only public high school in the Norwalk City School District. The school was established in 1857 and the nickname of the school is the Truckers.

== Location ==
Norwalk High School is located at 350 Shady Lane and serves students in grades 9-12. Having an enrollment of approximately 800 students with about 100 of them attending EHOVE Career Center, the school has a staff of 40 teachers, 2 guidance counselors, a principal, an assistant principal and full-time or part-time support staff and teaching specialists.

Norwalk High has been accredited with North Central Association since 1912. Norwalk High offers 110 course offerings in college preparatory, business, vocational, home economics, industrial arts, general courses, learning disabilities classes, Advanced Placement and tutoring. The high school also offers advanced placement courses in English, American History, U.S. Government, Calculus, Biology, French, Spanish, and Computer Science. Honors classes are also offered in English, Geometry and Algebra II. The music program includes marching band, orchestra, concert band, wind ensemble, and choir.

== Activities ==
Norwalk High offers a wide variety of extra-curricular activities for students from sports to clubs. These include:

=== Sports ===
Football, Volleyball, Golf, Boys' & Girls' Tennis, Cross Country, Track, Softball, Baseball, Wrestling, Boys' & Girls' Bowling, Boys' & Girls' Basketball, Soccer and Swimming.

A long-time member of the Northern Ohio League (1944-2017), Norwalk joined the Sandusky Bay Conference in 2017. They are a founding member of the Northern Ohio Conference after leaving the Sandusky Bay Conference with nine other schools in 2026.

=== Clubs ===
Art, Student Council, World Language, Blue Squad (Recycling), Key Club, FCCLA, Book Club, Focus 4:12, Firelands (Academic) Challenge, N.E.R.D Nation, Chess Club, Hacky Sack Club, and Debate Club.

=== Blue Pride Marching Band ===
The Blue Pride Marching Band performs at all football games. The band is currently under the direction of Mr. Will Kish and Assistant Director Ms. Melissa d'Aliberti. The band is open to all students grades 9-12.

In addition to the above activities, NHS also provides: Fall, Winter and Spring Sports Awards, Academic Awards, Academic Hall of Excellence, Student of the Month, Underclassman Awards Recognition, Senior Awards Banquet,Winter & Spring Band, and Orchestra & Choir concerts.

== Ohio High School Athletic Association State Championships ==
Championships

- Boys Football, Class AA – 1974
- Boys Volleyball - 1989 (unsanctioned)
- Boys Basketball, Division II – 2014 State Champions
- Girls Volleyball, Division II - 2012 Runners Up
- Boys Track and Field 4 × 800 m Relay, Division 1 - 2014 Runners Up
- Dan Pugh, wrestling 1972

== The Trucker Imprint ==
The Norwalk High School student newspaper is the Trucker Imprint. The paper (when first published was called the Signal) was published around the start of the 20th century until it was discontinued in the early 1980s. During the 1993–1994 school year, The N.H.S. Underground was founded and produced four editions but folded amidst the district's continued budget deficits of the mid-1990s. The paper was introduced again to the high school when it moved to its new location at 350 Shady Lane in 2001.
