= Hackenberger =

Hackenberger is a surname. Notable people with the surname include:

- Bessie Mecklem Hackenberger (1876–1942), American saxophonist
- Ron Hackenberger (born 1935/36), American businessman and car collector
