= Emma Rood Tuttle =

American author and lecturer (1839–1916)

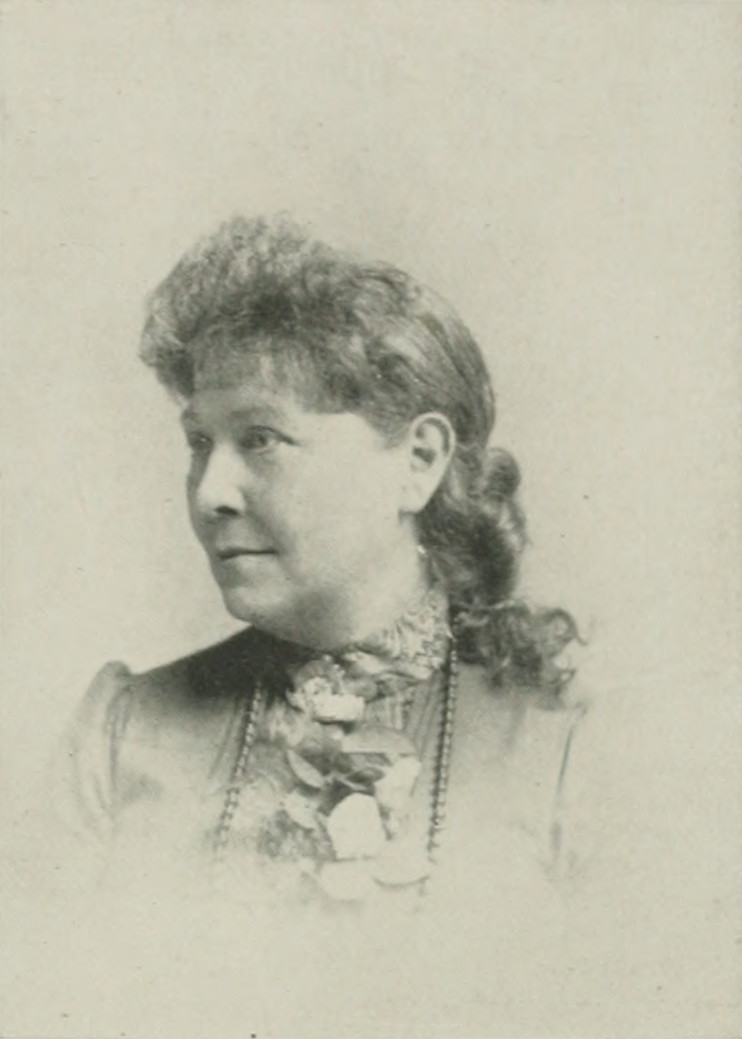
- "A Woman of the Century"
- Born: Emma Rood; July 21, 1839; Braceville Township, Ohio, U.S.
- Died: June 4, 1916 (aged 76); Berlin Heights, Ohio, U.S.
- Education: Western Reserve University; Hiram College
- Occupations: writer; lecturer; reformer
- Spouse: Hudson Tuttle (m. 1857; died 1910)
- Children: 3
- Writing career
- Subject: Spiritualism

Signature
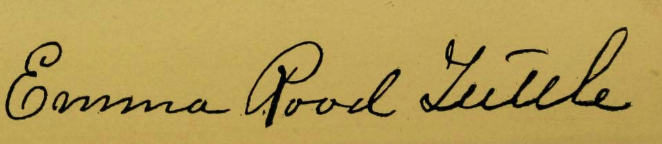

Emma Rood Tuttle (July 21, 1839 – June 4, 1916) was an American author and lecturer engaged in educational and reform work. Her literary work was versatile. It primarily included poetry and journalism, but also a considerable amount of lectures, essays, and contributions to journals. As a poet, she was a constant contributor to the leading reformatory journals, and frequently to the secular press. Sometimes, she collaborated with her husband, Hudson Tuttle, on books. Their home was a center of reformatory influence in Northern Ohio.

== Early life and education ==
Emma Rood was born in Braceville Township, Ohio, July 21, 1839, on the farm where her mother, Jane A. (Miller) Tuttle passed her childhood. Her father was John Rood, Jr., a native of East Canaan, Connecticut, who came to Ohio in 1836. She was a descendant of an old New England family, with French and Welsh ancestors.

It was while a pupil of the boarding school at Twinsburg, Ohio, that she became interested in Spiritualism. It was there she first heard a spiritual lecture and her intellect grasped the significance of a belief derided by others. About this time, she and her family were converted to the Spiritualism belief and withdrew from the Methodist church.

Tuttle was educated in the Western Reserve University, Farmington, Ohio, and in Hiram College, of which institution, President James A. Garfield was then the head. In her school-days she wrote verse.

On October 11, 1857, she married Hudson Tuttle, author, poet, and lecturer.

== Career ==
At the age of 17, she began writing prose and verse to the periodical press. Her early writings for The Universe of Cleveland, Ohio showed a literary promise that was borne out by her later work as an author. Gazelle, a True Tale of the Great Rebellion: And Other Poems, (Boston, 1866), was published anonymously. How Elvie Saved the Baby (1889) was a story of the Conemaugh Flood of 1889.

From Soul to Soul (New York City, Tuttle Publishing Company, 1890), was a 225 page volume containing the best poems of the author, and some of her most popular songs with the music by various composers. The poems were adapted for recitations. The book also included a portrait of the author. Among the poems which attracted notice were: "Budding Rose", "Incidents of Life under the Blue Laws", "Parson Smith's Prophesy", "From the Highlands of Heaven", "The City of Sorrow", "Soliloquy of Fulvia at Sicyon", and "The Holy Maid of Kent". The music included "The Unseen City", "My Lost Darling", "Beautiful Claribel", "One more River to Cross", and "Emma Clair".

Asphodel Blooms and Other Offerings (New York City, Tuttle Publishing Company, 1901; London, H. A. Copley, 1902) was a 285 page book containing 139 poems, and 20 stories, a part of the latter by Clair Tuttle. There were six full-page illustrations, among which were the likenesses of the author and her daughter, Clair. A second edition was published in London in 1902. In it, the poems and stories were nearly all short ones, about 150 of them in 270 pages. An ardent Spiritualist, Tuttle's sympathies overflowed with kindness. The poems were on simple subjects; her songs of hope were infused with her faith. Some of the pieces included were "My Ethel isn't in it", "Advanced", "My Agnosticism", "Heartbreak Hill", "Adah isaacs Menken", and "The exit of Ingersoll".

A Golden Sheaf

Emma and Hudson Tuttle were joint authors of several publications. Seven years after their marriage, the Tuttles published Blossoms of Our Spring (1864). Stories for our Children (P. H. Baston, publisher, Toledo, Ohio, 1874) was a 62 page book containing stories and poems. A Golden Sheaf (Tuttle Publishing Company, 1907) served as a souvenir of the couple's Golden wedding anniversary. It included portraits, six full-page engravings, three songs with music, autobiographical sketches, and autographs of the authors. Nearly 300 pages in length, it was made up of what the writers regarded as among the most valuable of their inspirations in prose and poetry. Three years later, they jointly wrote a book retelling traditional spiritual folklore, Stories from Beyond the Borderland (1910).

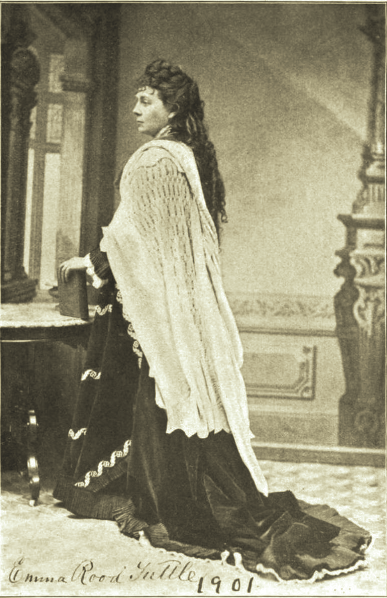
Emma (1901)

Tuttle was perhaps better known to the general public in Ohio through her songs and her dramatic readings. Her lyric compositions were set to music by various composers, among whom were James G. Clark, of New York; Professor Baily, of Michigan; Felix Schilling, of Philadelphia; H. M. Higgins, E. T. Blackmer, Emily B. Talmage, of Chicago; and Dr. E. L. Perry, of Milan, Ohio. Among the more popular of these compositions were "My Lost Darling', "The Unseen City", and "Beautiful Claribell". A pupil of Prof. Leonard of Boston, Tuttle gained distinction in elocution, especially in tragic parts.

Assisted by friends, Mr. and Mrs. Tuttle organized a Lyceum in Milan, Ohio beginning with 35 members. The organization was very successful and reached a membership of more than 400. It was then that she wrote and was chief editor of, The Lyceum Guide (Tuttle Publishing Company, 1870), a textbook for Freethought Sunday schools. The Lyceum Guide was prepared for the use of societies, Lyceums, Sunday schools, and the home. Described as a manual of physical, intellectual, and spiritual culture, it contained a collection of music and songs, gold chain recitations, memory works, choral responses, funeral services, programs for sessions, parliamentary rules, instructions for organizing and conducting lyceums, instructions in physical culture, calisthenics and marching, as well as banners and stands for the Bands of Mercy.

She was very interested in the American Education Society, of which George Thorndike Angell was founder and president. Tuttle served as one of the vice-president of the organization for several years. Tuttle originated The Angell Prize Competition in Oratory for diffusion of humane education, and the Angell prize medal was designed by her. In kindness to animals, she was an ally to Angell, and for many years, she took an active part in the Grange and was a constant contributor to the agricultural press, especially to the Grange Bulletin.

Angell-Prize Contest Recitations to Advance Humane Education (Francis, Chicago, and Hudson Tuttle, Berlin Heights, Ohio, publishers, 1896; Tuttle Publishing Company, 1910) was compiled by Tuttle for use in entertainments managed by churches, societies, Lyceums, Sunday schools, Bands of Mercy, or individuals aiming to establish "justice over all". Tuttle, active in the field of reform toward the higher education of children of Liberals and Spiritualists through her lectures and lyceum guide books, designed Angell-Prize Contest Recitations to advance humane education in all its phases. It included selected pieces in prose and verse, particularly suited for elocution and recitation purposes. All the selections touched upon the quality of human sympathy in regard to our treatment of the animals. The work was named after Angell, and his portrait adorned the cover, along with a short sketch of his life and work in behalf of animals, written by Claire Tuttle, daughter of Hudson and Emma Tuttle. Angell contributed eight short recitations toward the many selections which made up the book. Emma Tuttle contributed about a dozen original prose and poetic sketches. The other selections were from other writers, such as Eugene Sue, Constance Fenimore Woolson, Sam W. Foss, Eben E. Rexford, Abby Judson and Hudson Tuttle. Several pages were given in preface, explanatory of the best methods of conducting these prize-contest exhibitions, and the proper arrangement of hand bills and posters by which to advertise these events. Thousands of copies of Angell-Prize Contest Recitations were given away by the Society. In this work, she met many philanthropists.

== Personal life ==
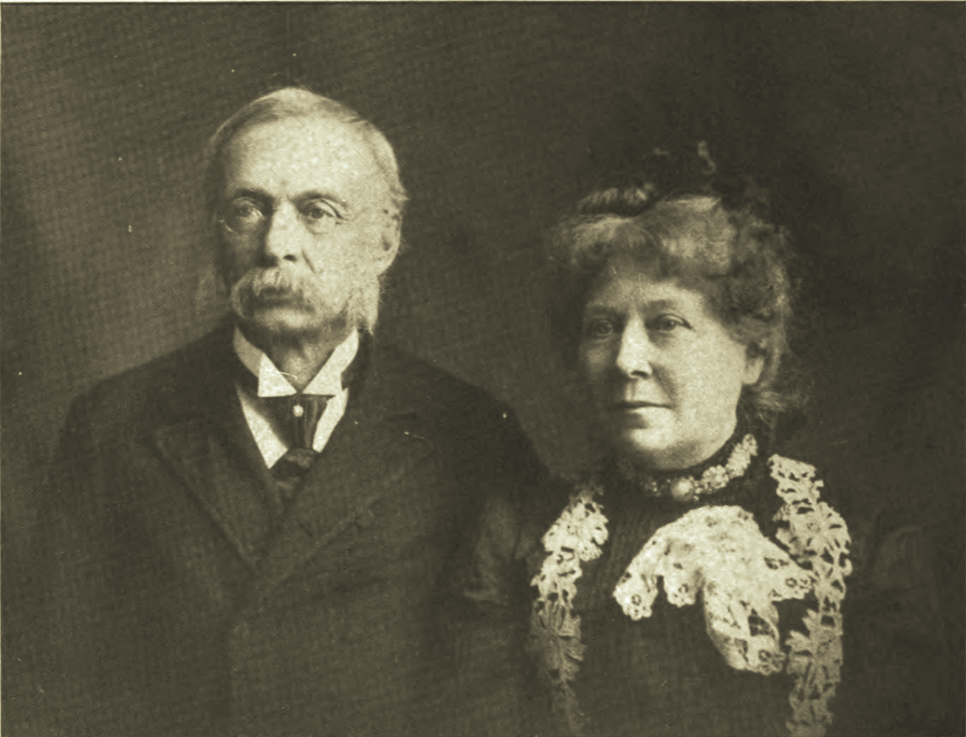
Hudson and Emma (1910)

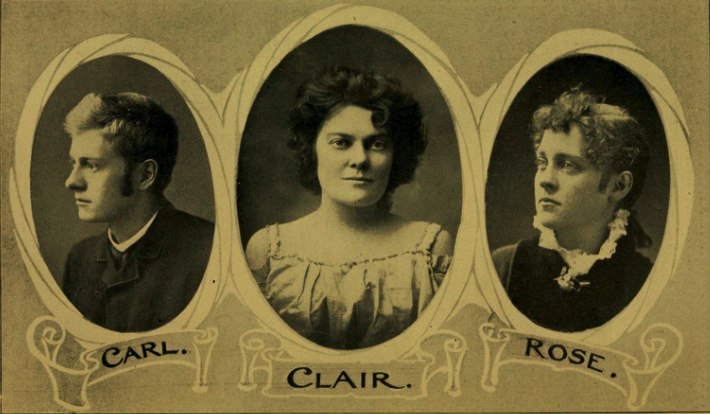
Carl, Claire, and Rose Tuttle (1907)

Mr. Tuttle was of Berlin Heights, Ohio, and the couple made their home there. The family consisted of three children: Rose Crocker Staley (d. 1905); Dr. Carl Tuttle, ornithologist; and Clair Tuttle Yerance, an actor.

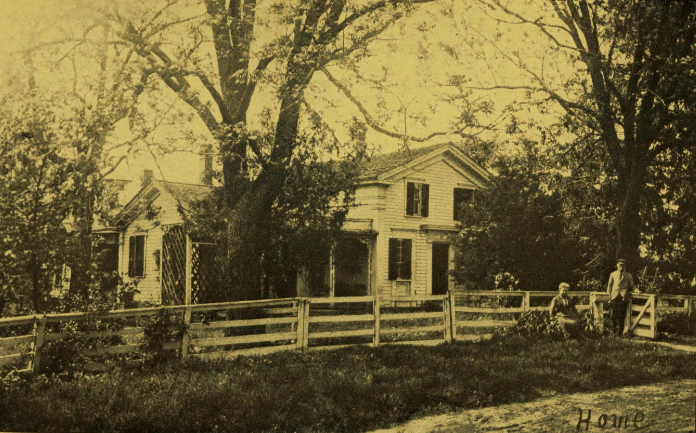
Tuttle home, Walnut Grove Farm, Berlin Heights, Ohio

Emma Rood Tuttle died at her home at Walnut Grove Farm, Berlin Heights, Ohio, June 4, 1916, caused by pneumonia and heart disease.

== Selected works ==
- Gazelle, a True Tale of the Great Rebellion: And Other Poems, (1866)
- The Lyceum Guide (1870)
- How Elvie Saved the Baby (1889)
- From Soul to Soul (1890) (Text)
- Angell prize-contest recitations. To advance humane education in all its phases... (1896, 1910) (Text)
- Asphodel Blooms and Other Offerings (1901)

=== Co-author with Hudson Tuttle ===
- Blossoms of Our Spring (1864)
- Stories for our Children (1874)
- A Golden Sheaf (1907)
- Stories from Beyond the Borderland (1910)
