= Canesadooharie =

"Canesadooharie" is the recorded spelling of a name of a river in the northern part of the U.S. state of Ohio. In the late 19th century it was thought to refer to the Black River of modern-day Lorain County. it is now believed more likely to have been the Huron River, which passes Milan before meeting Lake Erie at the village of Huron.

== History of name ==
In 1755, 18-year-old James Smith was captured from Pennsylvania by indigenous American Iroquois, and brought to live with their nation in Northern Ohio. (The customs of this tribe included "adopting" an outsider to replace one of their dead.) Smith lived here as one of them until 1759, when he found an opportunity to return home. He later wrote about his own experiences. Much of his time in Northern Ohio was spent near a river which he calls "Canesadooharie". Smith recorded that this river was "about 8 miles east of Sandusky" and "interlocks with the West Branch of the Muskingum". This corresponds to the Huron River, which is about 10 miles east of Sandusky Bay, and which nearly meets the headwaters of the Black Fork of the Mohican River, which connects into the Muskingum. The Huron River is known from another source as the "Guahadahuri", possibly a different version of the same name.

But Smith also wrote, of the "Canesadooharie", that it had a "falls", "12 to 15 feet high, and nearly perpendicular", which the modern Huron River does not possess. This detail was seized upon by later historians, as evidence that the river of Smith's travels, was instead the Black River of Lorain County, which has two separate and impressive falls in the vicinity of Elyria, Ohio. More historians added to the confusion, by attributing the meaning of the word "canesadooharie" as "black pearl", or even more romantically as "string of black pearls"; but it is not known what evidence, if any, that those historians used to support that translation. Later historians simply repeated the earlier theories, until finally Smith's "Canesadooharie" was accepted to be the Black River, instead of the Huron River. The likelihood is that the single falls which Smith experienced over a period of many weeks in 1756, "12 to 15 feet high, and nearly perpendicular", i.e. high and very steep rapids, was somewhere in the vicinity of (now) Norwalk, Ohio; and by the mid-1800s, nature had probably reduced them to being more like actual rapids, than a "falls".

It is unfortunate that the original historians disregarded most of Smith's observations here. The Black River is about 30 miles, not "about 8 miles", from Sandusky Bay; and the two separate falls on the Black River are each about 40 feet in height, and absolutely perpendicular, poorly matching Smith's description beyond the word "falls". Nevertheless, "Canesadooharie" is now accepted as an alternate name for the Black River, rather than for the Huron River for which it was intended.
