= Norwalk City School District =

School district in Ohio, United States

Address
- 134 Benedict Avenue Norwalk, Ohio, 44857; United States

District information
- Type: Public
- Grades: PK–12
- Schools: 6
- NCES District ID: 3904456

Students and staff
- Students: 2,453 (2024–2025)
- Teachers: 146.16 (on an FTE basis) (2024–2025)
- Staff: 258.43 (on an FTE basis) (2024–2025)
- Student–teacher ratio: 16.78 (2024–2025)

Other information
- Website: www.norwalktruckers.net

Norwalk City School District is a public school district serving students in the city of Norwalk, parts of Bronson Township, and Norwalk Township in Huron County, Ohio, United States. The school district enrolls 2,859 students as of the 2007-2008 academic year.

== Schools ==
The school district has 8 schools, six of which are public, two are private. The current clustering of grades in certain buildings began with the 2011-2012 school year.

=== Maplehurst Elementary School ===
Maplehurst Elementary is located at 195 St. Mary's Street and serves students in pre-school, Kindergarten and 1st grade.

Maplehurst was built in 1953.

=== Pleasant Elementary School ===
Pleasant Elementary is located at 16 S. Pleasant Street and serves students in 2nd and 3rd grade.

The original Pleasant was built in 1867 at a cost of $13,035.79. This building was later demolished.

=== League Elementary School ===
League Elementary is located at 16 League Street and serves students in 4th grade.

The original League Street School was built around 1872 and demolished in 1912-1913.

=== Main Street Intermediate School ===
Main Street Intermediate is located at 80 E. Main Street and serves students in 5th and 6th grade. This school once was the high school, but became the intermediate school when the new high school was finished being built in 2001.

=== Norwalk Middle School ===
Norwalk Middle School is located at 64 Christie Avenue and serves students in 7th and 8th grade.

=== Norwalk High School ===
Norwalk High School is located at 350 Shady Lane and serves students in grades 9-12. Norwalk High has been accredited with North Central Association since 1912 and is also a member of the Sandusky Bay Conference (SBC) for athletic competition. The current building opened for the 2001-2002 school year.

=== Former schools ===
- Benedict School at 134 Benedict Avenue is now home of the Board of Education offices. It was closed in either 1980 or 1981 along with Bronson-Norwalk. In the 1970s, NCSD tried grade "clustering" in their system and paired Benedict with Bronson-Norwalk. Benedict would house grades K-3 and then send those students to Bronson-Norwalk for 4-6. The same was done with League (K-3) and Pleasant (4-6), while Maplehurst housed K-6 during this time.
- Bronson-Norwalk Township School used to stand at 66 Townline Road 151. It was also closed in 1981 after 43 years of service. The Norwalk Virus (aka Norovirus) was named after an outbreak here in 1968.
- East Main Street School at East Main St. and Old State Rd. is currently a private residence.
- Hester Street School
