= Henry Litchfield West =

American journalist and politician (1859–1940)

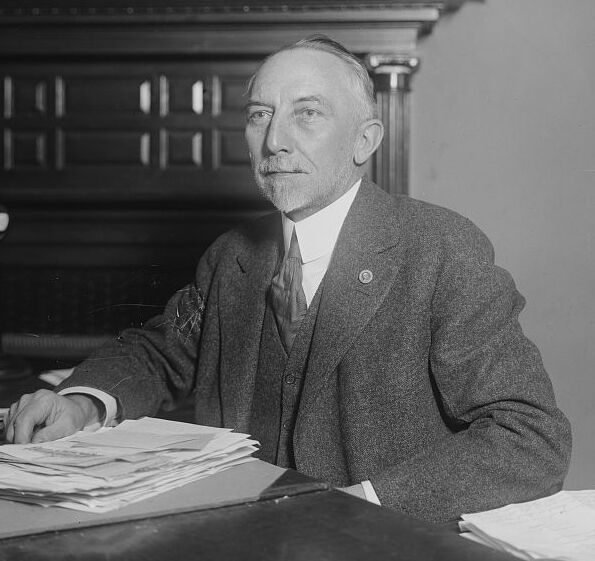
- Portrait of West in 1920

Member of the Board of Commissioners of Washington, D.C.
- In office October 13, 1902 – 1910
- President: Theodore Roosevelt; William Howard Taft
- Preceded by: John Wesley Ross
- Succeeded by: John Alexander Johnston

Personal details
- Born: August 20, 1859; Staten Island, New York, U.S.
- Died: September 3, 1940 (aged 81); West Haven, Maryland, U.S.
- Resting place: Oak Hill Cemetery
- Political party: Democratic
- Spouse: Mary Henry Hope White (m. 1882)
- Children: 3
- Occupation: Journalist; politician
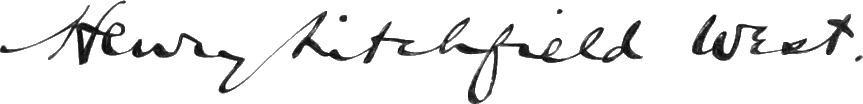
- Signature

Henry Litchfield West (August 20, 1859 – September 3, 1940) was an American journalist and politician from Washington, D.C. He was a reporter and managing editor of The Washington Post. He served on the Board of Commissioners of Washington, D.C., from 1902 to 1910.

== Early life ==
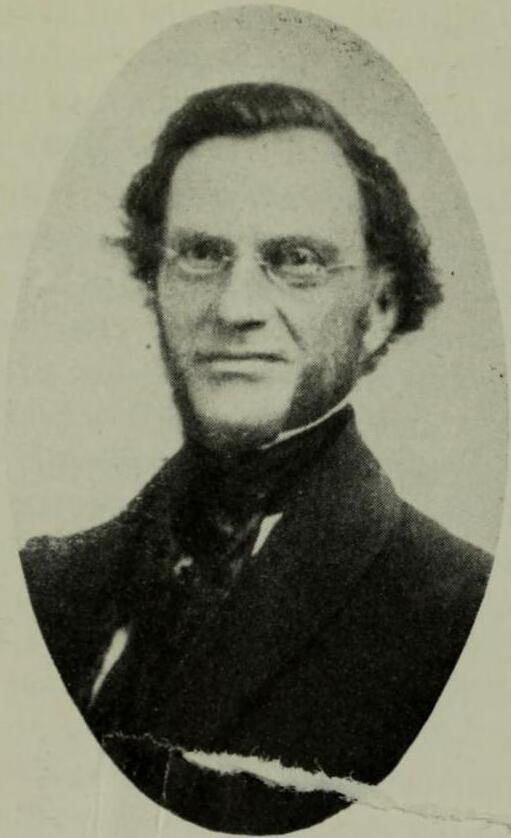
West's father, hymnist Robert Athow West

Henry Litchfield West was born on August 20, 1859, in Factoryville, Staten Island, New York, to Elizabeth and Robert Athow West. His father was a hymnist and editor-in-chief of the New York Commercial Advertiser. He was raised as a Methodist. West's family moved to Georgetown when he was young. He attended West Street Academy, a private school taught by Julius Soper in Georgetown. His father died in 1865 and he later left school at the age of 12.

== Career ==
West first worked as an office boy and reporter for the weekly paper Georgetown Courier under J. D. McGill. He was then a reporter with The Washington Union. He began at The Washington Post as a reporter and later worked as a city editor and managing editor. He then worked as a political correspondent for The Post and attended every national convention starting in 1888. He led the political department of The Forum magazine. For two years, he worked as a clerk and stenographer with the Metropolitan Police Department.

On October 13, 1902, West was appointed by President Theodore Roosevelt as a member of the Board of Commissioners of Washington, D.C.. He succeeded John Wesley Ross. He served on the board until 1910. In 1921, he began writing about golf. He continued writing about golf for 12 years and served as the first president of the National Golf Writers' Association.

West was a Democrat and member of the Columbia Democratic Club. He was a member of the board of trustees of the Emergency Hospital. He was a member of the committee from Washington, D.C., at the Tennessee Centennial and International Exposition.

== Personal life ==
West was president of the Gridiron Club in 1900. He was president of the Columbia Golf Club for two years and served on its board of governors. He was a member of the Mount Pleasant Congregational Church. He lived on Capitol Hill and later on Harvard Street in Columbia Heights.

West married Mary Henry Hope White, daughter of Sarah Vernon (née Eskridge) and William Henry White, on July 25, 1882. They had two daughters and a son, Marion, Mary Athow and Vernon Eskridge. He had a heart attack on September 3, 1940, aged 81, at Columbia Country Club. He died later that day at his daughter's house in West Haven, Maryland. He was buried in Oak Hill Cemetery.
