= James Kent Hamilton =

American politician

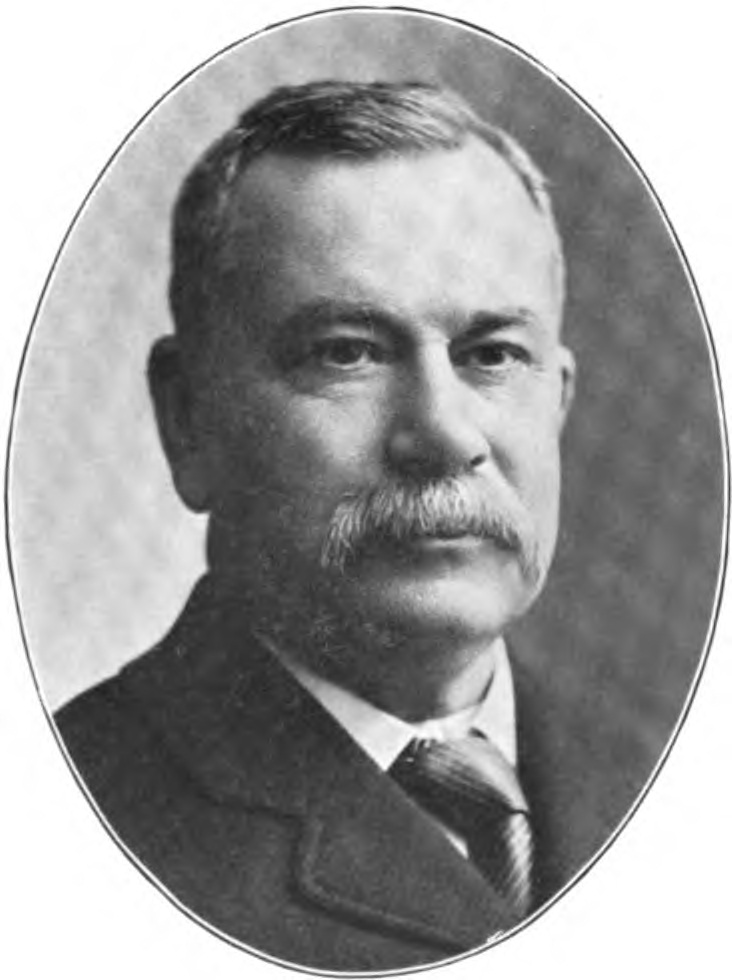

29th Mayor of Toledo, Ohio
- In office 1887–1891
- Preceded by: Samuel F. Forbes
- Succeeded by: Vincent J. Emmick

Personal details
- Born: May 17, 1839 Milan, Ohio, US
- Died: December 29, 1918 (aged 79) Toledo, Ohio, US
- Party: Republican
- Spouse(s): Sibyl Williams; Ethel B. Allen
- Education: Kenyon College

Military service
- Allegiance: United States of America
- Branch/service: Union Army
- Years of service: May 28, 1863 - July 6, 1865
- Rank: Captain
- Unit: 113th Ohio Infantry

James Kent Hamilton (1839 – 1918) was an American soldier and politician who served as mayor of Toledo, Ohio, from 1887 to 1891.

== Biography ==
James Kent Hamilton was born in Milan, Ohio, May 17, 1839. He was the son of Thomas and Sarah O. (Standart) Hamilton. His father was a merchant and shipper, and served as a Whig in the Ohio Senate. James graduated from Milan schools, and from Kenyon College in 1859. He studied law in Mount Vernon, Milan, and Toledo, Ohio, and was admitted to the bar in 1862. He served as a captain in the 113th Ohio Infantry until the end of the American Civil War.

Hamilton resumed the practice of law in Toledo after the war and was prosecuting attorney of Lucas County in 1869. He was elected mayor of Toledo in 1887 and 1889, serving four years.

Hamilton was married on October 13, 1876, to Sibyl Williams, who died in 1877. He was remarried on July 27, 1898, to Ethel B. Allen. He was a member of the Methodist Episcopal Church.

Hamilton died December 29, 1918, in Toledo.
