= Petquotting =

Petquotting or Pettquottink (pronounced "pay cutting" ) was the name that the Moravian Missionaries gave to their two settlements on the Huron River (Ohio). The first Moravian Christian Indian village of Petquotting was established in 1787, on the east side of the Huron River, and just north of what is now Mason Road, Milan Twp., Erie County, Ohio. In 1790, this village was officially named 'New Salem' by the Moravian synod. But it was abandoned by the Moravian-Indians shortly later, due to Native-American unrest in the area.

About 1804, the Moravian-Indians returned, to a site a few miles south of the old village, and established a new village of Petquotting, upon what is now the village of Milan, Ohio. This second village of Petquotting was abandoned about 1808, with the coming of the new pioneer Caucasian settlers from the Eastern U.S.

The Moravian Missionaries also referred to the Huron River, itself, as "the river Petquotting", mainly in order to differentiate it from the Huron River (Michigan), upon which the Moravian-Indians had a prior, and also a later, settlement.

The word 'petquotting' originated from a Native-American word "pay-ka-tunk" or "petquattunk", meaning a "high round hill", which referred to a specific, currently unknown, location somewhere in the general vicinity of the Huron River (Ohio) (and perhaps as far as 10 miles distant from later-day Milan village). This earliest "petquattunk" was a Native American-Indian fortified village, and was said to be several miles south of Lake Erie, but (according to the Moravian Archives) was high enough to view Lake Erie from that hill.
