= Huron River (Ohio) =

Coordinates: 41.3981°N 82.5491°W

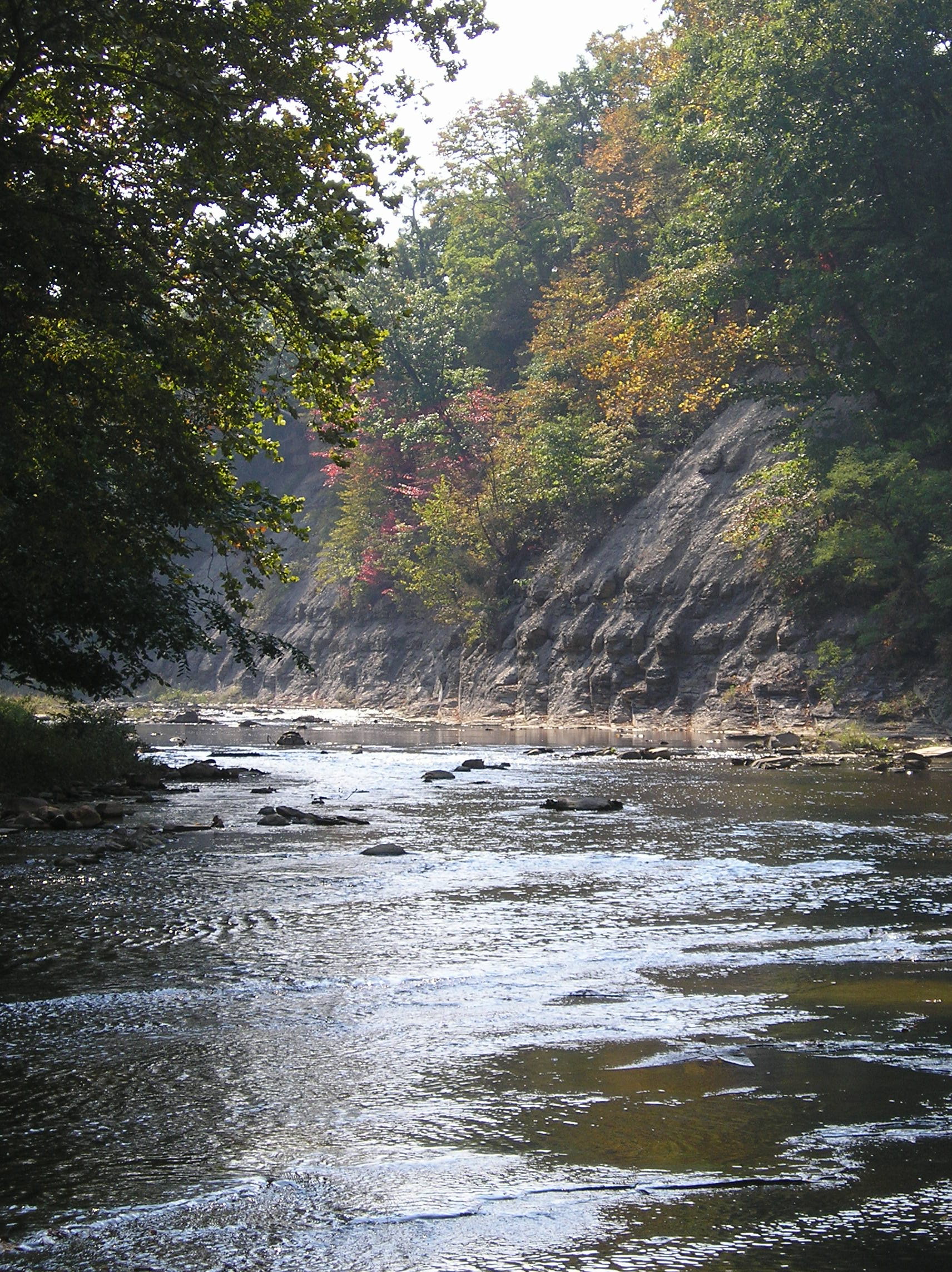
- An early autumn scene of the west branch of the Huron River, near the towns of Milan, Monroeville, and Norwalk in north central Ohio.

Location
- Country: United States

Physical characteristics
- Source
  - location: East of Shiloh, Ohio
  - elevation: 1,090 ft (330 m)
- Mouth
  - location: Lake Erie at Huron, Ohio
  - elevation: 571 ft (174 m)
- Length: 15 mi (24 km)
- Basin size: 406 mi^{2} (1,050 km^{2})

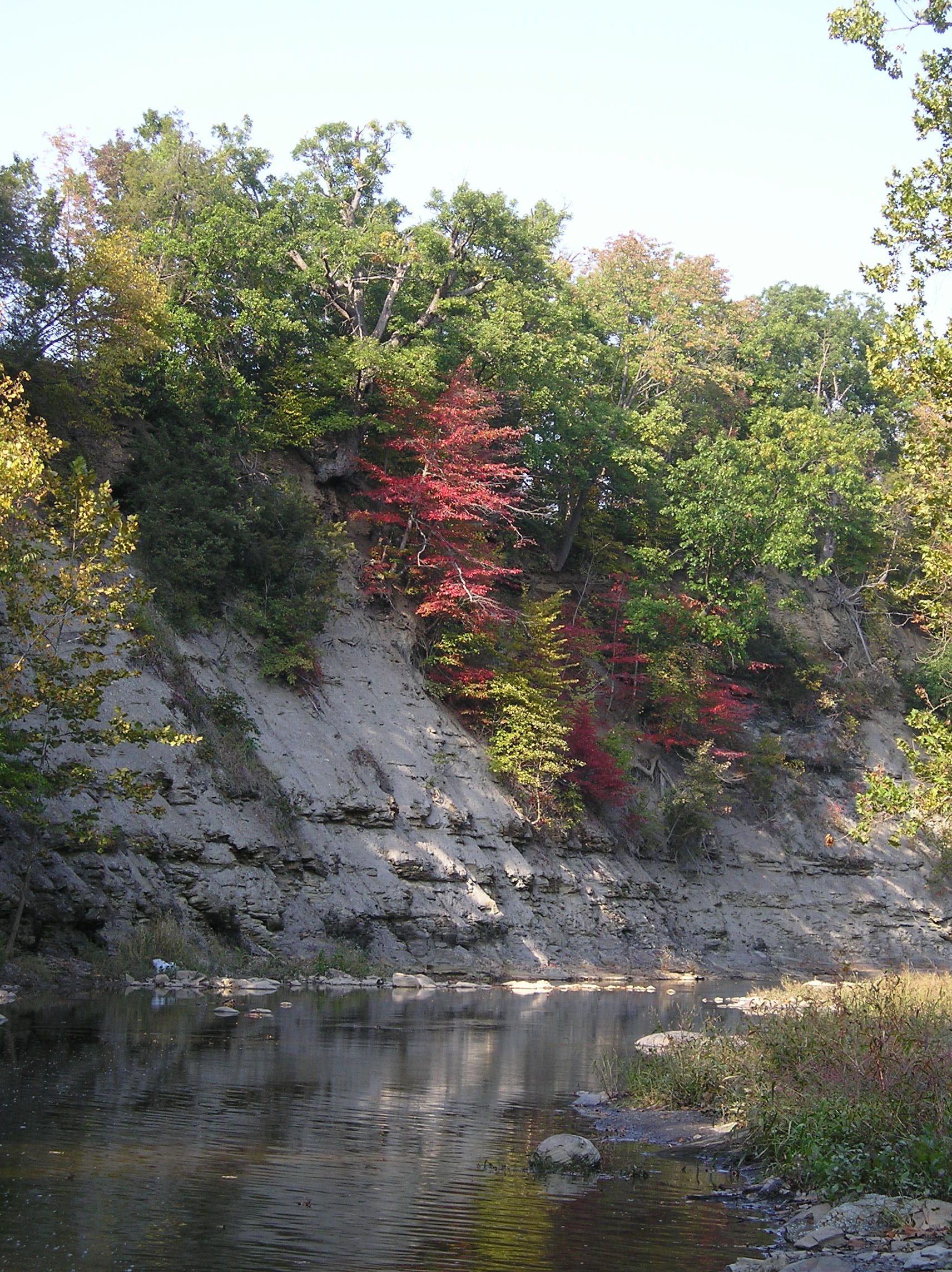
A scenic view of the West Branch of the Huron River

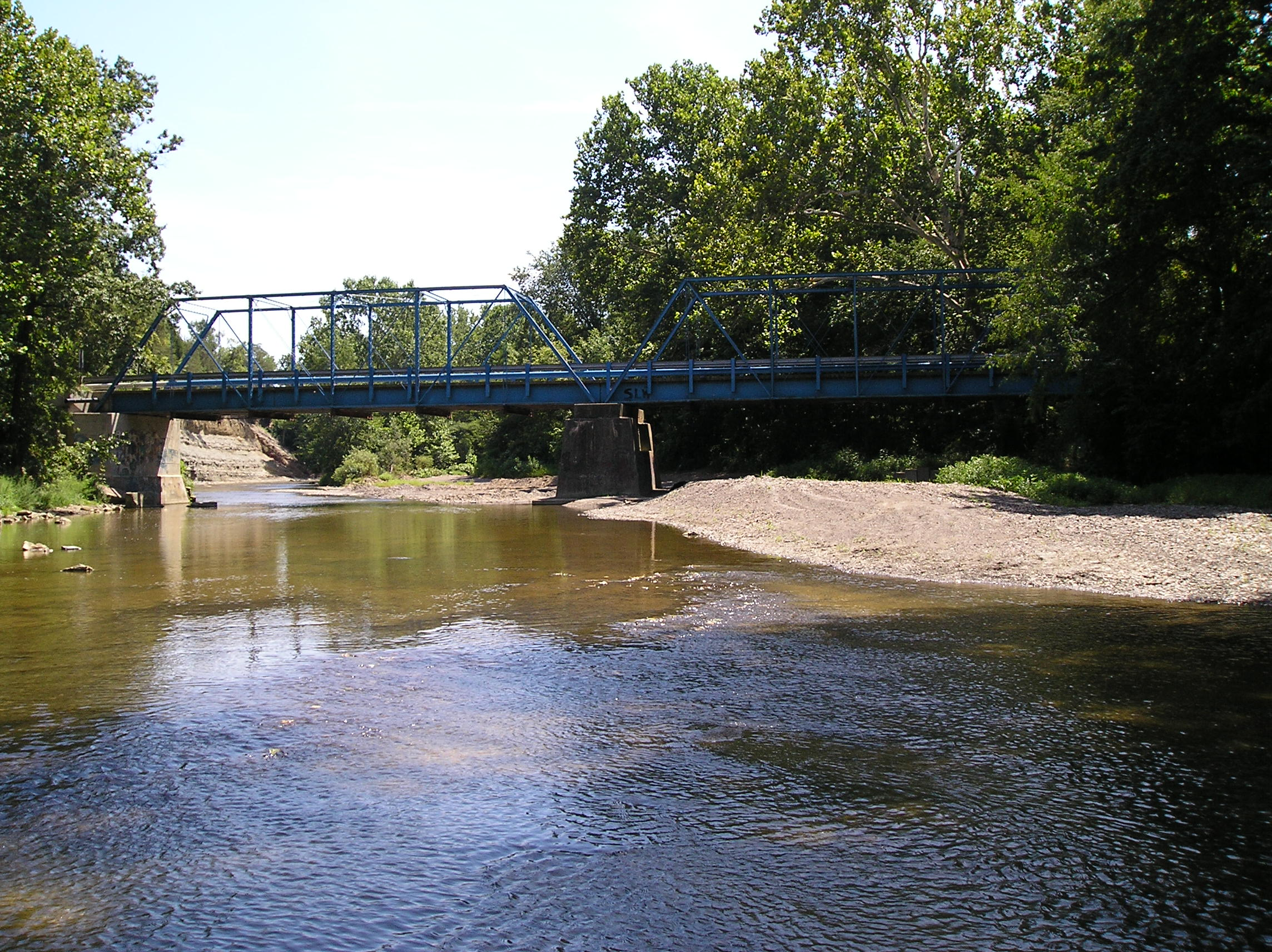
Blue Bridge carries Lamereaux Road across the river in Ridgefield Township; it was built after the July 5, 1969 flood washed the other bridge away (the river was near thirty feet in depth)

Huber Road bridge in Oxford Township; it, too, was built after the July 5, 1969 flood washed the other bridge away

The Huron River is a 14.9-mile-long (24.0 km) waterway in the north central Ohio in the United States. The watershed drains large portions of Erie County and Huron County, the northeast corners of Seneca County and Crawford County, and northern portions of Richland County.

The mouth is on Lake Erie at the city of Huron. The main branch of the river is formed when the East and West branches merge near Milan.

The East Branch, 31.8 miles (51.2 km) long, rises west of Fitchville and flows west to North Fairfield, where it bends north and flows through Peru and Norwalk before reaching Milan.

The West Branch is 54.5 miles (87.7 km) long. It rises about 4 miles (6.4 km) south of Greenwich and four miles east of Shiloh, near the intersection of Gilger Road and Noble Road in northern Richland County's Blooming Grove Township. This is within a few miles of the headwaters of both the southwest branch of the Vermilion River (which also flows north to Lake Erie) and Shipp Creek, which is part of the Ohio River watershed via the Black Fork, Mohican, Walhonding, and Muskingum rivers. The West Branch of the Huron flows north and west from Blooming Grove Township through Huron County's Ripley Township, then back into Richland County's Cass Township and into Plymouth. It is here where the river bends north to flow across the Richland/Huron county line into Huron County's New Haven Township and into New Haven. It passes to the east of Willard, although other tributaries rise north of Willard. Still in Huron County, the West Branch continues north through Greenfield Township, Peru Township, and Ridgefield Township. The West Branch continues north into Monroeville and through the balance of Ridgefield Township. Next, the river crosses from Huron County into Erie County and then bends in an easterly direction through southern Oxford Township before reaching the confluence with the East Branch in the Milan State Wildlife Area.

== Tributaries ==
- Christiana Creek
- Clayton Ditch
- Cole Creek
- Frink Run
- Haas Ditch
- Jacobs Creek
- Marsh Run (see note)
- Megginson Creek
- Milan Village Creek
- Mud Brook
- Mud Run
- Norwalk Creek
- Old Woman Creek
- Rattlesnake Creek
- Sandhill Creek
- Schoeffel Ditch
- Seymour Creek
- Shriner Run
- Slate Run
- Walnut Creek

Note: Willard Marsh, within the Willard Marsh State Wildlife Area, feeds into both the West Branch of the Huron River and the Honey Creek tributary of the Sandusky River. Also, there are numerous creeks, streams, and ditches that are unnamed tributaries in the Huron River basin.

== Variant names ==
According to the Geographic Names Information System, the Huron River has also been known as:

- Hurons River
- Notowacy Thepy [or Naudowessie Sipi ]
- Petquotting [a name adapted from the Moravian village here, 1787–1791.]
- Riviere Huron [or "Riviere aux (Rx) Hurons"]
- Bald Eagle Creek [named for a very large nest of bald-eagles at the river's mouth, in the 1700s]
- Huron Creek

Similarly, the West and East branches have been referred to as the West and East forks.

- Also shown on early maps as named the "Guahadahuri".
- The word "Huron" refers to a Native-American tribe who were also known as the Wyandots (sometimes spelled "Wendots" or "Junundats"). This tribe had many villages in the area of Sandusky Bay, in the latter-1700s.

The Huron River had been given that name by European explorers at least by 1778, when it appears as such on a map by Hutchins. A much earlier map, by Evans in 1755, names it as the "Guahadahuri". (On that Evans map, because of the river's significant depth and navigability even at that early time, it was the only river denoted between Sandusky Bay and the Cuyahoga, but accurately being approx. one-fifth of the distance between the two.) Also in 1755, Pennsylvanian James Smith, who had been captured by Native-Americans and brought to this river to live among them, recorded the river's name as the "Canesadooharie". We do not know whether "guahadahuri" or "canesadooharie" was the more phonetically accurate representation of a Native-American word, but the word's translation seems lost to obscurity. In 1760, explorer George Croghan refers to the name of this river, also phonetically from its Native-American/Chippewa tribe name, as "Notowacy Thepy"; John Heckewelder recorded it as "Naudowessie Sipi", meaning "the River ("sipi") of the Huron ("Naudowessie") tribe". Some maps of the later-1700s also show the Huron River as "Bald Eagle Creek"; named for a large eagle's nest at its mouth at that time (although one later mapmaker from that time, erroneously denoted "Bald Eagle Creek" and "Guahadahuyi" as being two separate rivers).

- In 1787, the Moravian missionary, David Zeisberger, led a group of Christian-converted Native-Americans from their settlement on the Cuyahoga River, to a new settlement called first Petquotting (but later named 'New Salem' in 1790) on the Huron River, about 3 miles north of (now) Milan, Ohio. They remained until 1791 when forced by local Native-American unrest, they relocated to Canada; but in 1804, some of the Christian-converted Natives, under the direction of G.S. Oppelt, returned to a new different settlement here (also named Petquotting) and it eventually became the village of Milan, Ohio.
- Throughout the latter-1700s, the northern part of the river was a well-known outpost for many French-Canadian traders, including Gabriel Hunot who ran an Indian-trading-post there in the 1780s, and the later John B. Flammand (or "Flemming") about 1805. ---

[sources: Indian Captivities (pp. 191–201) by Drake (publ.1852 by Derby and Miller); and Diary(1787-1791) of David Zeisberger, (publ.1885 by Robert Clarke and Co., Cinti.; Heckewelder's History, Manners, and Customs of the Indian Nations; publ.1876; and Diary(1804-1806) of G.S. Oppelt, Moravian Archives, Bethlehem, PA]

== Road intersections ==
=== West Branch ===
Here is a detailed account of which roads cross over the West Branch of the Huron River; beginning at the headwaters near Shiloh in Richland County and ending at the confluence with the east branch near Milan in Erie County.

Richland County

Blooming Grove Township

- Noble Road
- Pennel Road
- Baseline Road

Huron County

Ripley Township

- Ashland Railway, formerly CSX Transportation/Baltimore and Ohio
- Edwards Road
- Plymouth East Road
- Old State Road
- New State Road
- Wheeling and Lake Erie Railway, formerly Akron, Canton and Youngstown Railway
- Plymouth East Road
- Townline Road 111
- Baseline Road

Village of Plymouth

- Broadway Street
- North Street
- Plymouth East Road

New Haven Township

- Skinner Road
- US 224
- Klein Road
- Greenbush Road
- Boughtonville Road
- CSX Transportation, formerly Baltimore and Ohio Railroad
- Townline Road 12

Greenfield Township

- Olive Road
- Maple Ridge Road
- SR 61
- SR 162
- Hanville Corners Road
- Peru Center Road
- Bauman Road

Peru Township

- Troy Mills Road
- Fern Road
- Snyder Road
- Peru West Section Line Road
- Hettle Road
- Terry Road

Ridgefield Township

- Standardsburg Road

Village of Monroeville

- North Coast Inland Trail, formerly New York Central Railroad
- Wheeling and Lake Erie Railway
- US 20 (Main Street)
- River Road

Ridgefield Township

- Lamereaux Road

Erie County

Oxford Township

- Huber Road
- Lovers Lane Road

Milan Township

- Confluence with the east branch of the Huron River

=== East Branch ===
Here is a detailed account of which roads cross over the East Branch of the Huron River; beginning at the headwaters near Fitchville in Huron County and ending at the confluence with the west branch near Milan in Erie County.

Huron County

Fitchville Township

- Crescent Road
- SR 162
- SR 162
- Greenwich Milan Townline Road

Fairfield Township

- Edwards Road
- Delta Road
- Fairfield Angling Road
- Old State Road

Village of North Fairfield

- New State Road (Main Street)

Fairfield Township

- SR 162
- Hanville Corners Road
- Townline Road 131

Bronson Township

- Ridge Road
- Townline Road 113

Peru Township

- SR 61
- Geiger Road
- Remelle Road
- Johnson Road

Ridgefield Township

- Brown Road
- US 20 / SR 18 Byp.

City of Norwalk

- Old West Main Street
- SR 61
- Wheeling and Lake Erie Railway

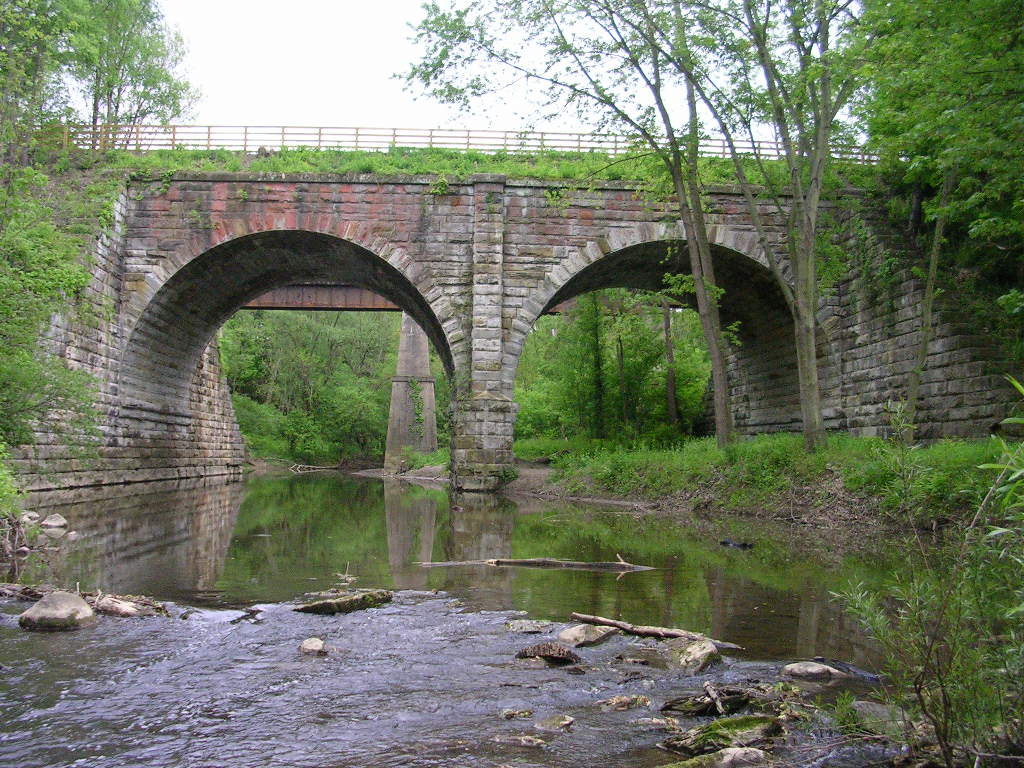
Former NYC double arch bridge over the East Branch of the Huron River, just west of Norwalk, Ohio.

- North Coast Inland Trail, formerly New York Central Railroad
- Washington Road

Norwalk Township

- Lovers Lane Road
- Schaffer Road

Erie County

Milan Township

- Confluence with the west branch of the Huron River

=== Main Stem ===
Here is a detailed account of which roads cross over the main stem of the Huron River; beginning at the confluence of the East and West branches near Milan in Erie County and ending at Lake Erie near Huron in Erie County.

Erie County

Milan Township

- US 250 / SR 13 / SR 113 (concurrent on the same four-lane road)
  - (US Geological Survey stream gauge located just downstream of this bridge)
- I-80 / I-90 / Ohio Turnpike (concurrent on the same six-lane road)
- Norfolk Southern Railway, formerly Nickel Plate Road
- Old Mason Road (bridge destroyed on 5 July 1969 flood)
- Mason Road

Huron Township

- SR 2

City of Huron

- Norfolk Southern Railway, formerly Conrail/New York Central
- US 6 (Cleveland Road)
- Lake Erie

== Other information ==
- At one point in Huron County's Peru Township, (approximately 7 linear miles away from the confluence) the East and West branches are only separated by approximately 0.64 miles (1.03 km). This is near the intersection of Johnson Road and Peru Center Road.
- An area near the confluence of Seymour Creek and the West Branch (on Lamereaux Road) is said to be haunted. This area also has history from the War of 1812 era. The Haunting at Blue Bridge

== See also ==
- List of rivers of Ohio
