= Hudson Tuttle =

Spiritualists

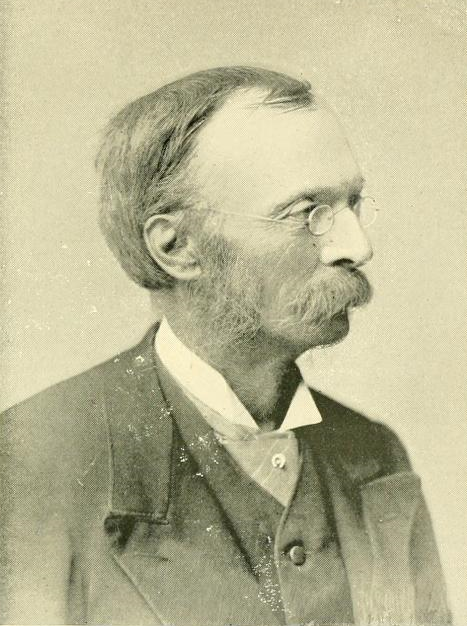
Hudson Tuttle

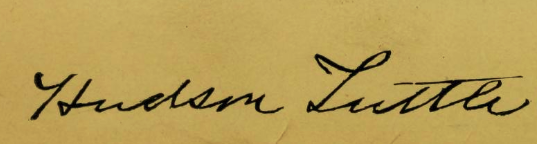
signature

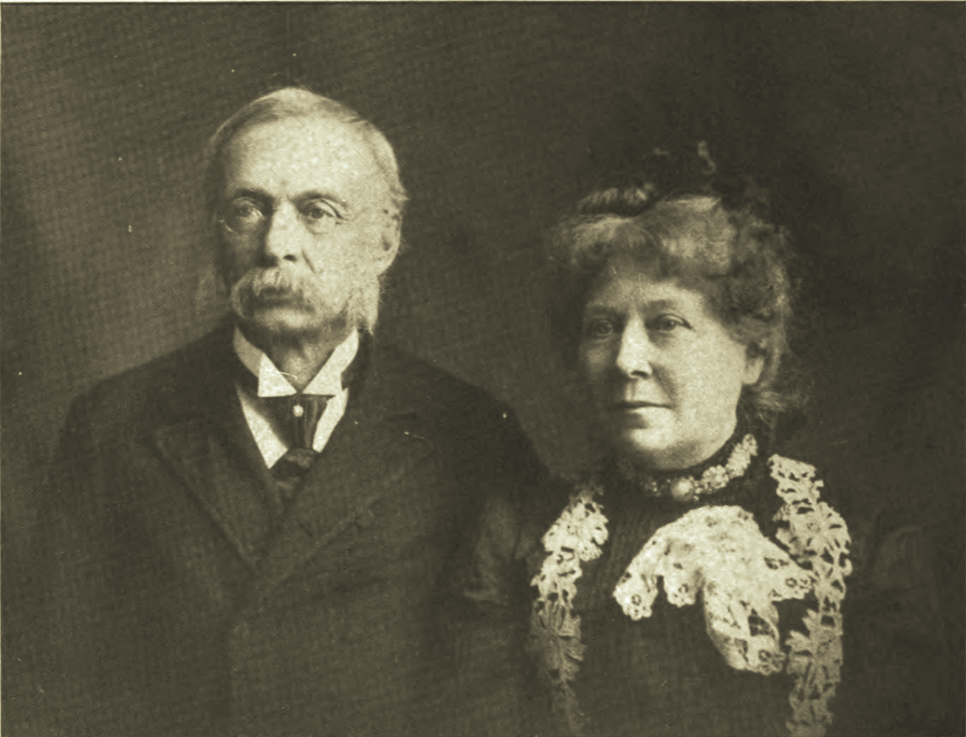
Hudson and Emma (1910)

Hudson Tuttle (October 4, 1836 – December 14, 1910) was an American Spiritualist author, publisher, and lecturer. He was constantly connected, as editor or contributor, with reform and spiritualistic journals.

Hudson Tuttle was born in Berlin Heights, Ohio, October 4, 1836. He was self-taught.

He met Emma Rood (1837–1916) after reading a publication of hers in a Cleveland periodical. They married in 1857, and settled on the Tuttle family farm in Berlin Heights (a farm Hudson's parents had bought in the early 1830s), where they engaged in agriculture and horse breeding.

Both committed Spiritualists, the couple published actively on the subject. Hudson wrote a number of books on Spiritualism, many published through his own Hudson Tuttle Publishing Company. Emma achieved early success publishing poetry. During her life, she wrote primarily poetry and journalism, and sometimes collaborated with Hudson on books. Late in life, they jointly wrote a book retelling traditional spiritual folklore, Stories from Beyond the Borderland (1910). A local Native American story in the collection, "The Legend of Minehonto", is interesting to scholars of Native American mythology as one of the few early accounts of the Western Reserve's pre-European oral traditions.

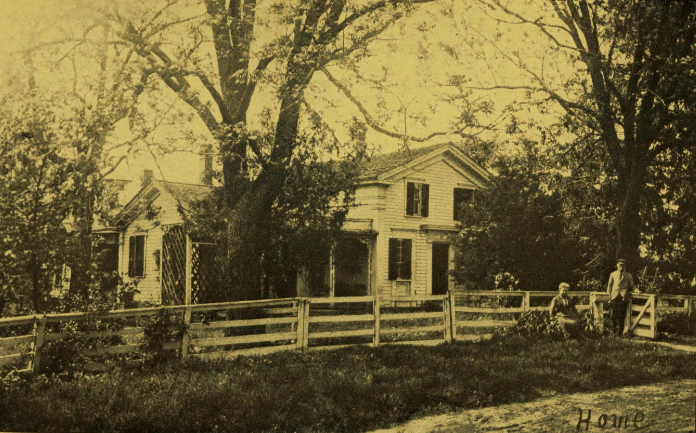
Tuttle home, Walnut Grove Farm, Berlin Heights, Ohio

He died on their farm in Berlin Heights in 1910, as did his wife six years later.

== Publications ==
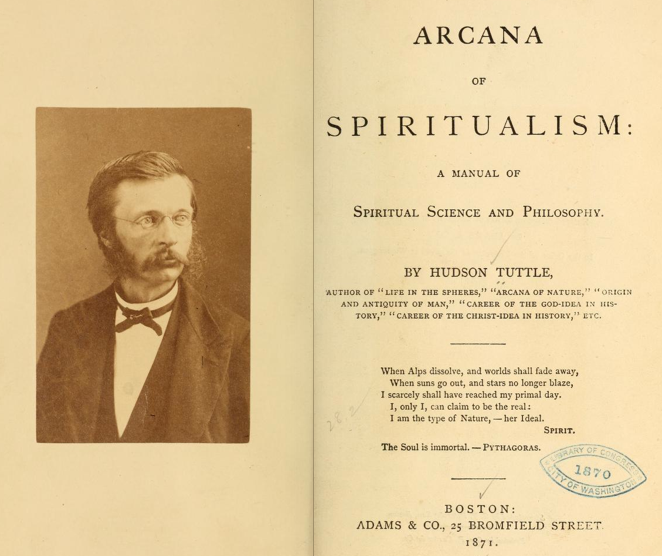
Arcana of Spiritualism

- Arcana of Nature: Or, The History and Laws Or Creation, Volume 1 (first edition published March 10, 1860; copyright 1859)
- Arcana of Nature: Or, The History and Laws of Creation, Volume 2 (1864)
- The Origin and Antiquity of Physical man Scientifically Considered (1866)
- The Career of the Christ-Idea in History (1870)
- Arcana of Spiritualism: A Manual of Spiritual Science and Philosophy (1871)
- Career of Religious Ideas (1878)
- Studies in the Out-Lying Fields of Psychic Science (1889)
- Religion of Man and Ethics of Science (1890)
- Arcana of Nature (1909)
- Stories from Beyond the Borderland (1910)
