= Lemon G. Hine =

American politician and lawyer (1832–1914)

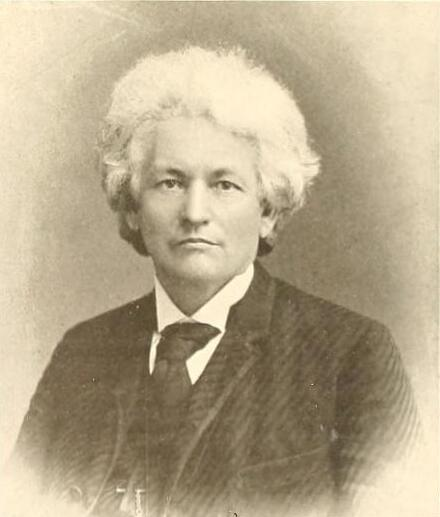
- Hine in a 1903 publication

Member of the Board of Commissioners of Washington, D.C.
- In office May 16, 1889 – October 1, 1890
- President: Benjamin Harrison
- Preceded by: Samuel E. Wheatley; William Benning Webb
- Succeeded by: John Wesley Ross

Personal details
- Born: Lemon Galpin Hine; April 14, 1832 Berlin Heights, Ohio, U.S.
- Died: January 19, 1914 (aged 81) Battle Creek, Michigan, U.S.
- Resting place: Rock Creek Cemetery; Washington, D.C., U.S.
- Party: Democratic
- Spouse: Mary Tillinghast
- Children: 6
- Education: Oberlin College
- Occupation: Politician; lawyer; businessman

Lemon Galpin Hine (April 14, 1832 – January 19, 1914) was an American politician and lawyer from Washington, D.C. He served as a member of the Board of Commissioners of Washington, D.C. from 1889 to 1890. He was known for his association with Ottmar Mergenthaler and the manufacturing of his linotype machine.

== Early life ==
Lemon Galpin Hine was born on April 14, 1832, on a farm in Berlin Heights, Ohio. He studied in public and private schools. He also attended the Norwalk Seminary, Baldwin University and the State and National Law School. He graduated from Oberlin College and studied law in Ann Arbor, Michigan. Hine moved to Iowa to try to start a town named "Lawrence".

== Career ==
Hine was the editor of the Cleveland Commercial from 1851 to 1852. He practiced law in Coldwater, Michigan, prior to the Civil War. He raised the Northwestern Rifle Regiment and was elected as captain, but declined the role. He was commissioned as first lieutenant of the 44th Illinois Infantry Regiment and served until April 1862. He resigned after losing his voice.

In May 1862 he moved to Washington, D.C. In 1863, he joined the firm Fitch, Hine & Fox and worked exclusively with the firm's business at the Court of Claims until the fall of 1864. He then formed a partnership with Governor Ford under the firm Ford & Hine. They worked courts martial and military commissions until the fall of 1866. He then studied law for six months and working in D.C. courts, he opened a law office in the spring of 1867. He continued his practice until the summer of 1885. He then suffered neuralgia that impacted his speech and retired in 1887. From 1869 to 1885, he was actively involved in civil cases in D.C. He was twice elected president of the Bar Association of the District of Columbia.

Hine was elected to the board of common council in 1868. In 1870, he was elected to the board of alderman of the city. He was a Democratic candidate to the U.S. Congress for D.C. in 1872, but lost to Norton P. Chipman. On May 16, 1889, he was appointed by President Benjamin Harrison as commissioner of the District of Columbia. He resigned on October 1, 1890, due to differences with the administration. While commissioner, Hine organized a relief fund for survivors of the Johnstown Flood. Around 1875 or 1876, he partnered with Sidney T. Thomas in the firm Hine & Thomas.

In 1882, Hine worked with Frank Hume to gain an interest in inventions related to the mechanical type composition. A few months later, he worked with Ottmar Mergenthaler to make a model machine. In January 1884, he organized the National Typographic Company to develop and manufacture the linotype machine. In 1886, the Mergenthaler Printing Company was organized to produce the Linotype machines. He was elected as president of the company and was in that role from March 1889 to September 1892. In the summer of 1890 he was elected general manager of the company and assumed management on October 1, 1890. Following the recommendation of Francis Lynde Stetson of Bangs, Stetson, Tracy & McVeigh, the Mergenthaler Linotype Company was organized with a capital stock of US$5,000,000 in 1883 or 1884. He was president of the Monoline Composing Company until at least 1898.

== Personal life ==
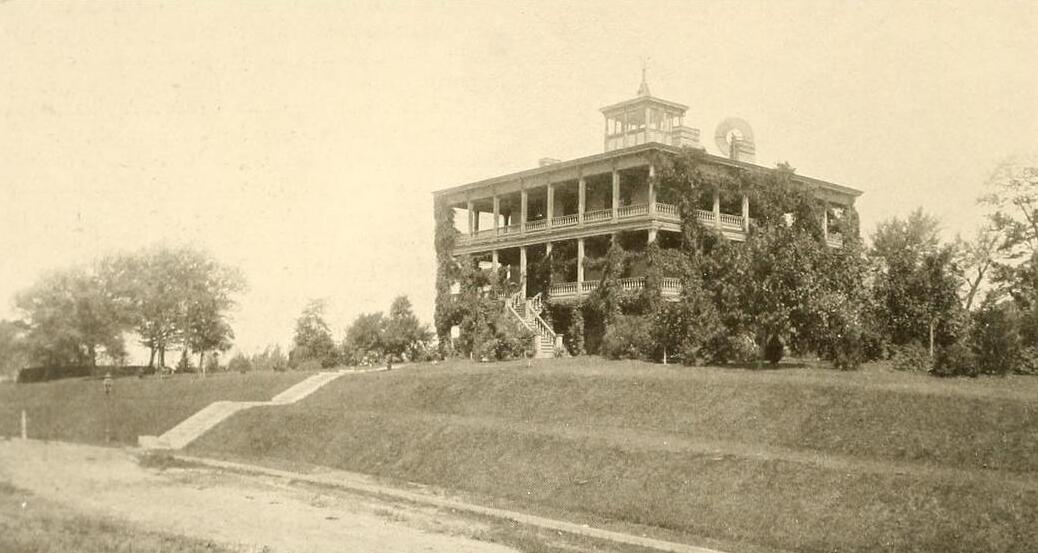
Prospect Hill home of Hine in Washington, D.C.

Hine married Mary Tillinghast. They had six children, Mrs. F. A. Fenning, Mrs. Edward P. Mertz, Mrs. Ramsay Nevitt, Mrs. J. Milton Boone, Oliver C. and Charles Lemon. They lived on Lincoln Avenue near Washington, D.C. Later in life, he lived with his daughter in Cleveland Park and vacationed to Miami, Florida. Hine was president of the Metropolitan Club.

Hine died of pneumonia on January 19, 1914, at a sanitarium in Battle Creek, Michigan. He was buried in Rock Creek Cemetery.

== Legacy ==
The original Eastern High School in Washington, D.C., was repurposed and dedicated in 1923 as the Hine Junior High School. It was located near Eastern Market, Washington, D.C., and named after Hine. In 2008, the school was merged with Eliot Junior High School into Eliot-Hine Middle School.
