= Milan, Ohio =

- Village
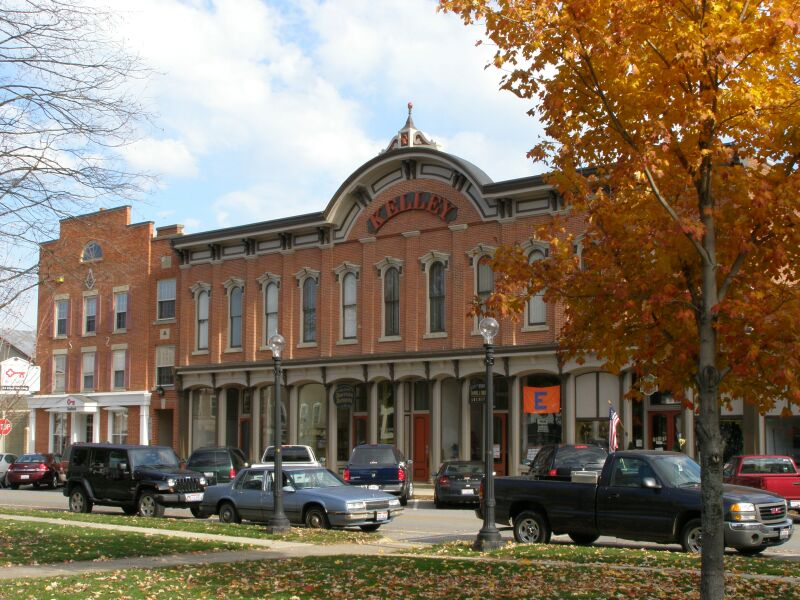
- The Kelley Block overlooking the public square
- Nickname: Edison
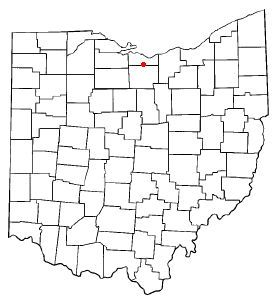
- Location of Milan, Ohio

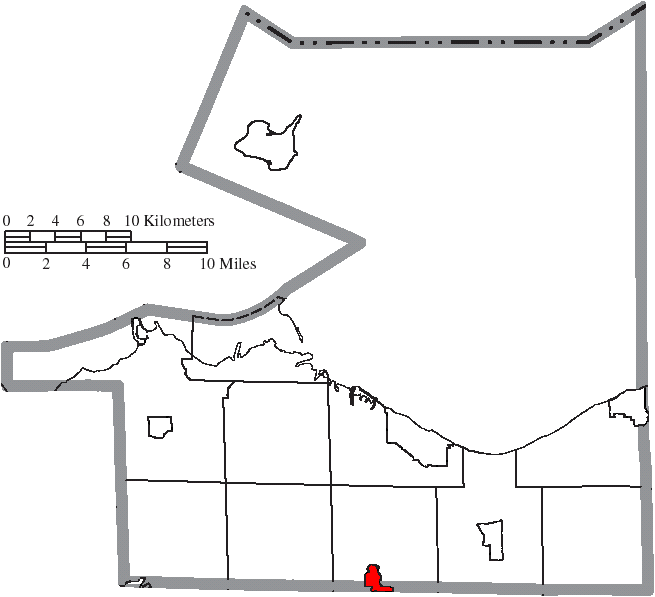
- Location of Milan in Erie County
- Coordinates: 41°17′17″N 82°35′58″W
- Country: United States
- State: Ohio
- Counties: Erie, Huron
- Townships: Norwalk, Milan

Government
  - Mayor: Pam Crosby

Area
  - Total: 1.21 sq mi (3.13 km^{2})
  - Land: 1.19 sq mi (3.08 km^{2})
  - Water: 0.015 sq mi (0.04 km^{2})
- Elevation: 666 ft (203 m)

Population (2020)
  - Total: 1,371
  - Density: 1,151.4/sq mi (444.56/km^{2})
- Time zone: UTC-5 (Eastern (EST))
  - Summer (DST): UTC-4 (EDT)
- ZIP code: 44846
- Area code: 419
- FIPS code: 39-50134
- GNIS feature ID: 2399341
- Website: www.milanohio.gov

Milan (/ˈmaɪlən/ MY-lən) is a village in Erie and Huron counties in the U.S. state of Ohio. The population was 1,371 at the 2020 census. It is best known as the birthplace and childhood home of Thomas Edison.

The Erie County portion of Milan is part of the Sandusky metropolitan area, while the Huron County portion is part of the Norwalk Micropolitan Statistical Area.

== History and culture ==
Milan village was platted by Ebenezer Merry in 1817 on the site of Petquotting, a previously abandoned Moravian Indian mission village (1805–1809). Merry dammed the Huron River below the village and established "Merrys Mills", a gristmill and sawmill in the river valley. Milan village, originally named 'Beatty', was incorporated as Milan in 1833, named after Milan, Italy. Prior to the advent of railroads, regional farmers had to bring their harvests to Lake Erie ports by wagon. The sandy and wet prairies north and west of Milan were not easily crossed by a wagon with a heavy harvest load. Beginning in 1826, local investors proposed a ship canal that would make Milan a lake port that could conveniently connect to the new Erie Canal, allowing direct regional commerce with New York City.

=== 1800s and the Milan Canal ===
Construction of the Milan Canal began in 1833 and it opened to lake navigation on July 4, 1839. The peak year of commerce was 1847. For 15 years or more, the village prospered as one of the busiest ports on the Great Lakes. Large numbers of wagons bringing agricultural products to Milan would often line up for miles to the south.

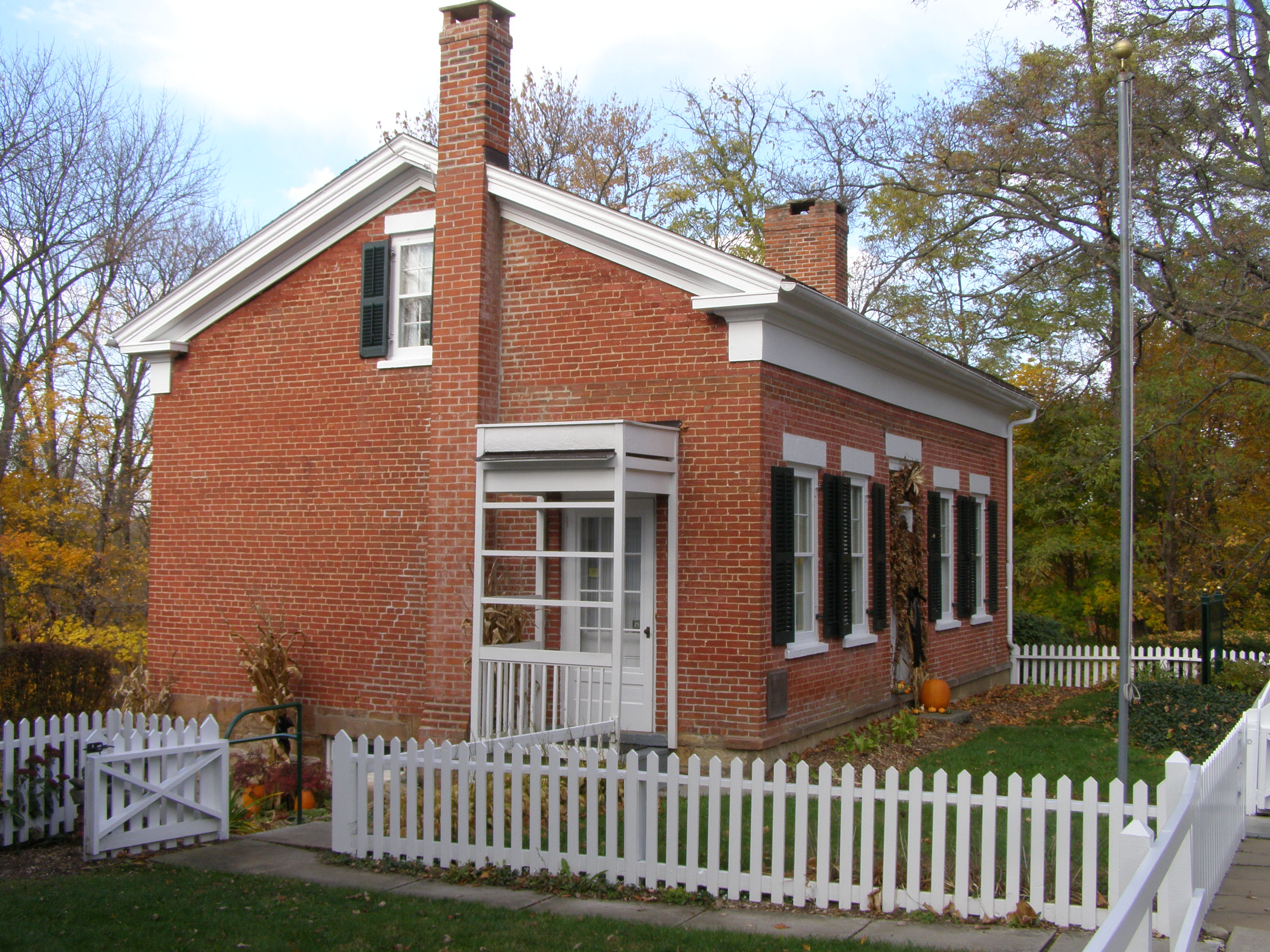
Birthplace of Thomas Edison

During the canal era, Milan became the birthplace of businessman and inventor Thomas Alva Edison, and the small hillside brick home where he was born on February 11, 1847, is open to the public as a museum. He lived in Milan until he was 7 years of age, when his family moved to Port Huron, Michigan.

Local brokerages and trading houses exchanged the agricultural commodities of farmers for currency, hardware, and trade goods brought in across Lake Erie from the East by way of the Erie Canal. The Milan Canal was deep and directly connected to Lake Erie, allowing Lake Erie schooners to transport goods to and from Milan without the use of small, shallow-draft canal boats required on other canals. The confluence the deep ship-bearing canal, the great agricultural fertility of the regional Ohio soils, and the direct access to New York markets by way of the Erie Canal made Milan a retail center from the 1830s to the early 1850s. However, with the advent of railroads in the 1850s, the canal-borne prosperity terminated. In 1868, the canal's feeder dam failed due to a flood, permanently ending Milan's direct connection to the lake. The original canal route can be observed and followed today along the Erie MetroParks "Huron River Greenway."

The deep canal and inland harbor also served as a ship building center, in part because of extensive local stands of white oak timber used in ship building. Approximately 60 ships were built in Milan between 1840 and 1867.

During the period, the canal-based prosperity allowed the construction of a large number of buildings of architectural note. Today, Milan retains a significant number of both residences and commercial buildings from the 19th century, representing typical architectural styles of the time.

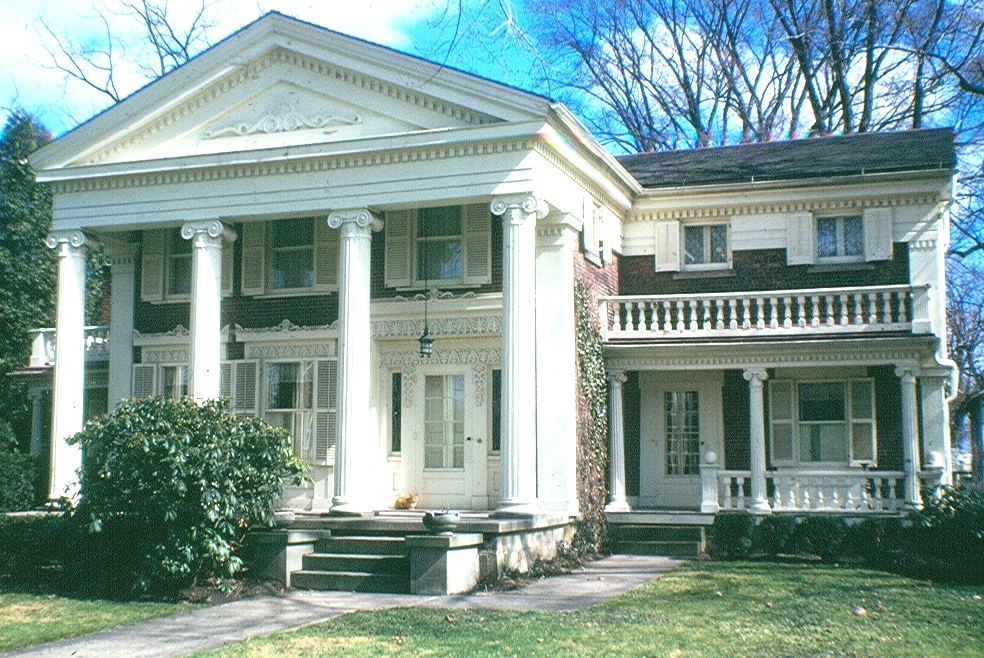
The Mitchell-Turner House, 1848

From the late 1820s and into the 1830s, Federal Style buildings were constructed, many of which survive. In the 1840s and 50s, the Greek Revival style predominated in Milan, as it did in the rest of the Connecticut Western Reserve (the northeastern counties of Ohio). Today, Milan’s neighborhoods abound with original Greek Revival houses, along with a number of other later, Victorian architectural styles.

With the threat of proliferating railroads, mid-century canal interests were able to prevent their incursion into Milan. This effectively isolated the village from the flourishing post-Civil War economy that occurred in other Midwestern towns. Consequently, Milan’s development and expansion essentially terminated in the 1850s and 60s. Today, the majority of the canal-era mansions and other buildings remain intact, making Milan one of the finest sites for 19th-century architectural history in the Midwest. The Kelley Block on the village square, along with the impressive great houses on all of the village’s streets are remarkably preserved. In 2002, Milan was selected by The National Trust for Historic Preservation as a Distinctive Destination.

Melon farming prospered in the area due to sandy, fertile soil, and Milan hosts the "Milan Melon Festival" annually on Labor Day weekend. Although many residents commute to other cities for employment, the general culture of the area is decidedly rural, agricultural, and historic. Because of its limited development after the closure of the canal, Milan retains the ambiance of a 19th-century village with New England cultural and architectural affinities.

Milan is home to the Edison Pen Company, one of the only manufacturers of fountain pens in the United States. Its resin barrels are handmade in Milan though its steel and gold nibs come from JoWo, a German firm that dates from 1852.

== Geography ==
According to the United States Census Bureau, the village has a total area of 1.21 square miles (3.13 km^{2}), of which 1.19 square miles (3.08 km^{2}) are land and 0.02 square miles (0.05 km^{2}) are water.

The Huron River flows just north of the village square.

== Demographics ==
Historical population
Census	Pop.	Note	%±
1860	771		—
1870	774		0.4%
1880	797		3.0%
1890	627		−21.3%
1900	653		4.1%
1910	696		6.6%
1920	653		−6.2%
1930	678		3.8%
1940	719		6.0%
1950	846		17.7%
1960	1,309		54.7%
1970	1,862		42.2%
1980	1,569		−15.7%
1990	1,464		−6.7%
2000	1,445		−1.3%
2010	1,367		−5.4%
2020	1,371		0.3%
U.S. Decennial Census

=== 2010 census ===
As of the census of 2010, there were 1,367 people, 509 households, and 370 families residing in the village. The population density was 1,148.7 inhabitants per square mile (443.5/km^{2}). There were 551 housing units at an average density of 463.0 per square mile (178.8/km^{2}). The racial makeup of the village was 97.5% White, 0.7% African American, 0.1% Native American, 0.6% Asian, 0.2% from other races, and 0.9% from two or more races. Hispanic or Latino of any race were 1.8% of the population.

There were 509 households, of which 33.6% had children under the age of 18 living with them, 57.6% were married couples living together, 10.2% had a female householder with no husband present, 4.9% had a male householder with no wife present, and 27.3% were non-families. 22.8% of all households were made up of individuals, and 10.8% had someone living alone who was 65 years of age or older. The average household size was 2.52 and the average family size was 2.95.

The median age in the village was 44.5 years. 23.6% of residents were under the age of 18; 5.8% were between the ages of 18 and 24; 21.2% were from 25 to 44; 32.6% were from 45 to 64; and 16.8% were 65 years of age or older. The gender makeup of the village was 49.5% male and 50.5% female.

=== 2000 census ===
As of the census of 2000, there were 1,445 people, 540 households, and 406 families residing in the village. The population density was 1,229.9 inhabitants per square mile (474.9/km^{2}). There were 574 housing units at an average density of 488.6 per square mile (188.6/km^{2}). The racial makeup of the village was 98.13% White, 0.55% African American, 0.21% Native American, 0.35% Asian, 0.28% from other races, and 0.48% from two or more races. Hispanic or Latino of any race were 0.90% of the population.

There were 540 households, out of which 33.0% had children under the age of 18 living with them, 60.2% were married couples living together, 10.4% had a female householder with no husband present, and 24.8% were non-families. 22.0% of all households were made up of individuals, and 11.5% had someone living alone who was 65 years of age or older. The average household size was 2.55 and the average family size was 2.98.

In the village, the population was spread out, with 24.9% under the age of 18, 6.4% from 18 to 24, 24.6% from 25 to 44, 25.4% from 45 to 64, and 18.8% who were 65 years of age or older. The median age was 41 years. For every 100 females there were 92.7 males. For every 100 females age 18 and over, there were 86.1 males.

The median income for a household in the village was $51,204, and the median income for a family was $57,986. Males had a median income of $42,426 versus $26,027 for females. The per capita income for the village was $23,143. About 3.20% of families and 4.6% of the population were below the poverty line, including 7.0% of those under age 18 and 3.8% of those age 65 or over.

== Public schools ==
Milan shares its school system with nearby Berlin Heights; the combined school district is known as the Edison Local Schools, and the high school teams are the "Edison Chargers." Edison High School offers college courses from Kenyon College and Findlay University. Contained within the school district are Edison Elementary, Edison Middle School, and Edison High School.

== Notable people ==
- Augustus L. Armstrong, lawyer, Minnesota state legislator
- Moses K. Armstrong, businessman, Dakota Territorial Legislator
- Thomas H. Armstrong, former Lieutenant Governor of Minnesota
- Thomas J. Bowles, former member of the Wisconsin State Assembly
- Thomas Edison, businessman, inventor
- Daniel McBride Graham, Freewill Baptist pastor, inventor, first president of Hillsdale College
- James Kent Hamilton, lawyer, Mayor of Toledo, Ohio

== Sister cities ==
The village of Milan currently has one international sister city.

- Yawata, Kyoto (Japan)
