= Alice Mabel Jordan =

American librarian

Alice Mabel Jordan (November 7, 1870 – March 9, 1960) was an American librarian. She was the head of children's work at the Boston Public Library and advocate for their spaces to accommodate them. She was known for raising the standards of children’s librarianship across the nation, including requiring the candidates to have an education. She was also involved with aiding the development of the children’s library at the Boston Public Library. She was seen by many to be an expert on the field of children, as she was one of the first children’s librarians in the United States of America.

== Early life and education ==
Alice Mabel Jordan was born November 7, 1870 in Thomaston, Maine. Her father was Joshua Jane Jordan, a sea captain from Maine, and her mother was Eliza Deborah (Bugbee) Jordan, a school teacher from Massachusetts. Her parents filled her life with stories, such as fairy tales and folk tales, and gave her a home school education while they were in Maine. Her father retired from the sea in 1880, and the family moved to Newton, Massachusetts. Jordan was then was enrolled in the public school system, where she would graduate in 1888 without much fanfare, she spent the next few years teaching until 1900, where she became a librarian.

== Career ==
Jordan became an assistant librarian at the Boston Public Library in October, 1900, and would transfer to the Children's department shortly afterwards. She remained in service there until 1917, when she was promoted to be the Supervisor of Children's Work. She went to Simmons College to teach children’s librarianship to the students from 1910 to 1922 when medical afflictions required her to step down from this position. Jordan also worked with Charles Belden to create the Boston Public Library Training School, as a way to raise the standards of professionalism in libraries.

== Retirement ==
She retired November 30, 1940, from working at the Boston Public Library, and she began working on a book while in retirement, as well as reviewing books for Horn Publishing. She lived in Massachusetts until her death March 9, 1960.
