= Ron Hackenberger =

American businessman (born 1935 or 1936)

- Born: 1935 or 1936 (age 90–91)
- Occupation: Businessman
- Known for: Car collection
- Spouse: Eunice Hackenberger
- Children: 6 daughters
- Website: www.ronhackenberger.com

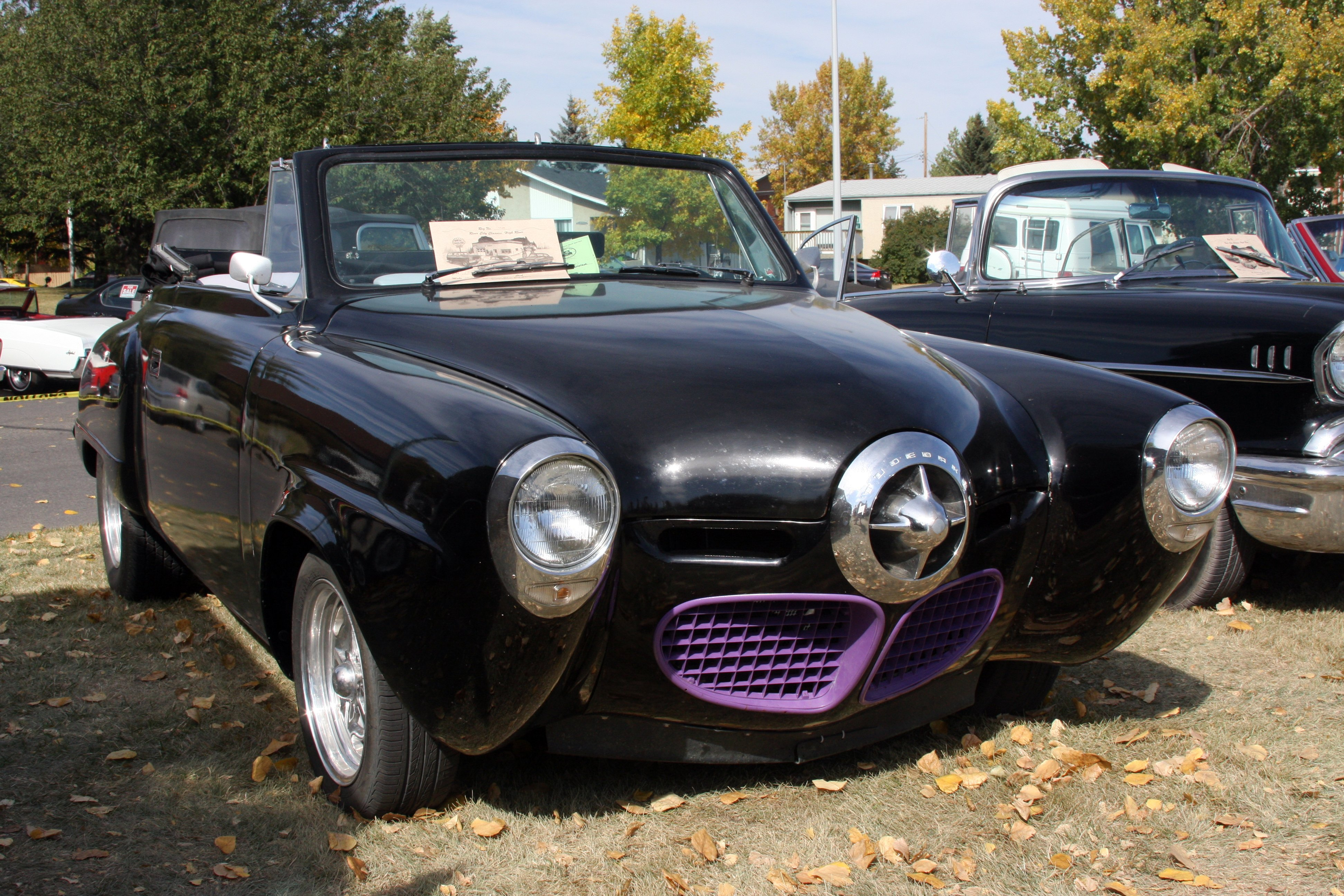
1948 Studebaker

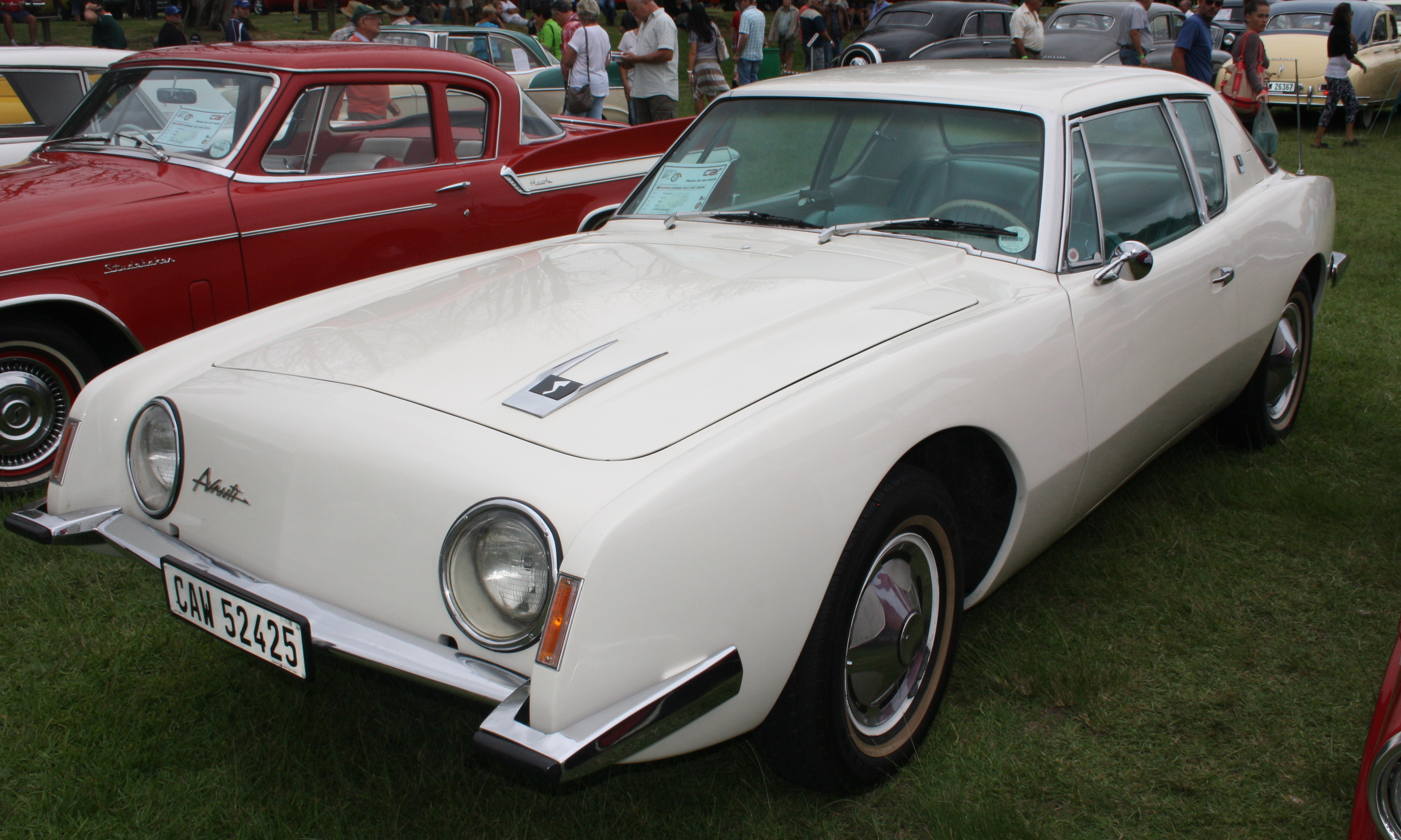
1963 Studebaker Avanti

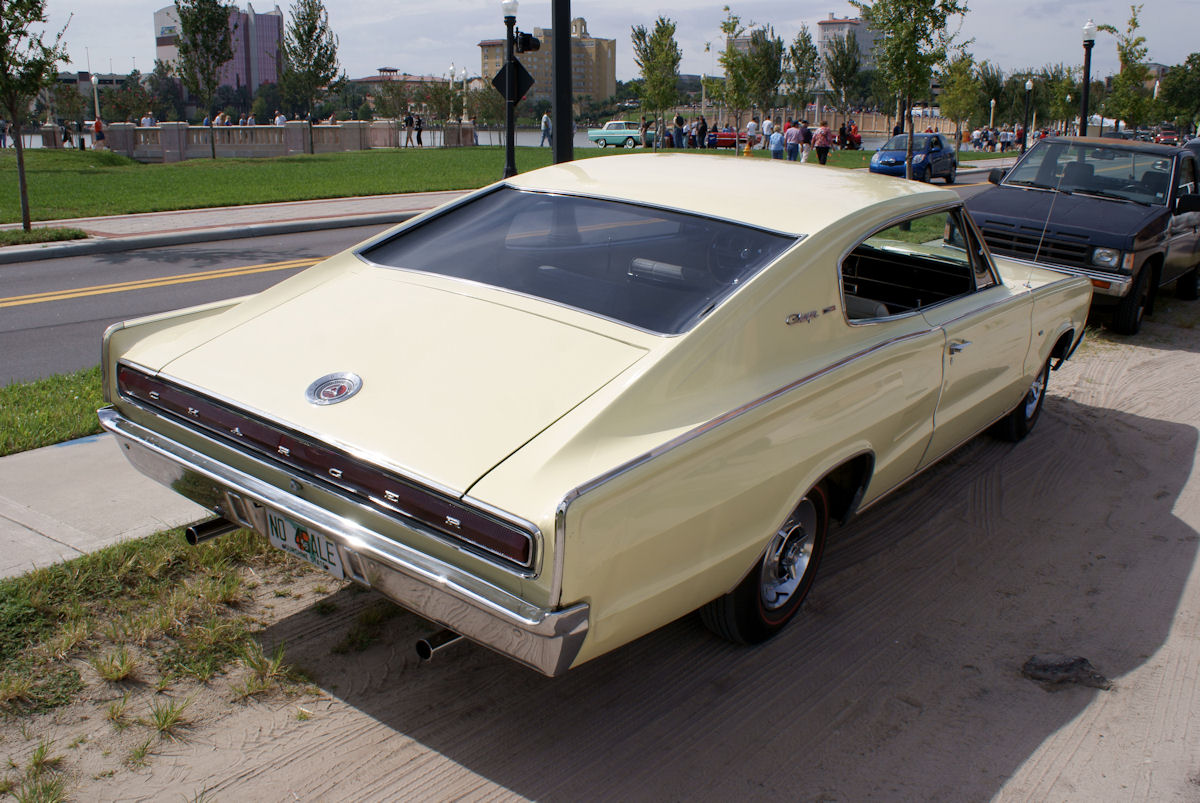
1966 Dodge Charger

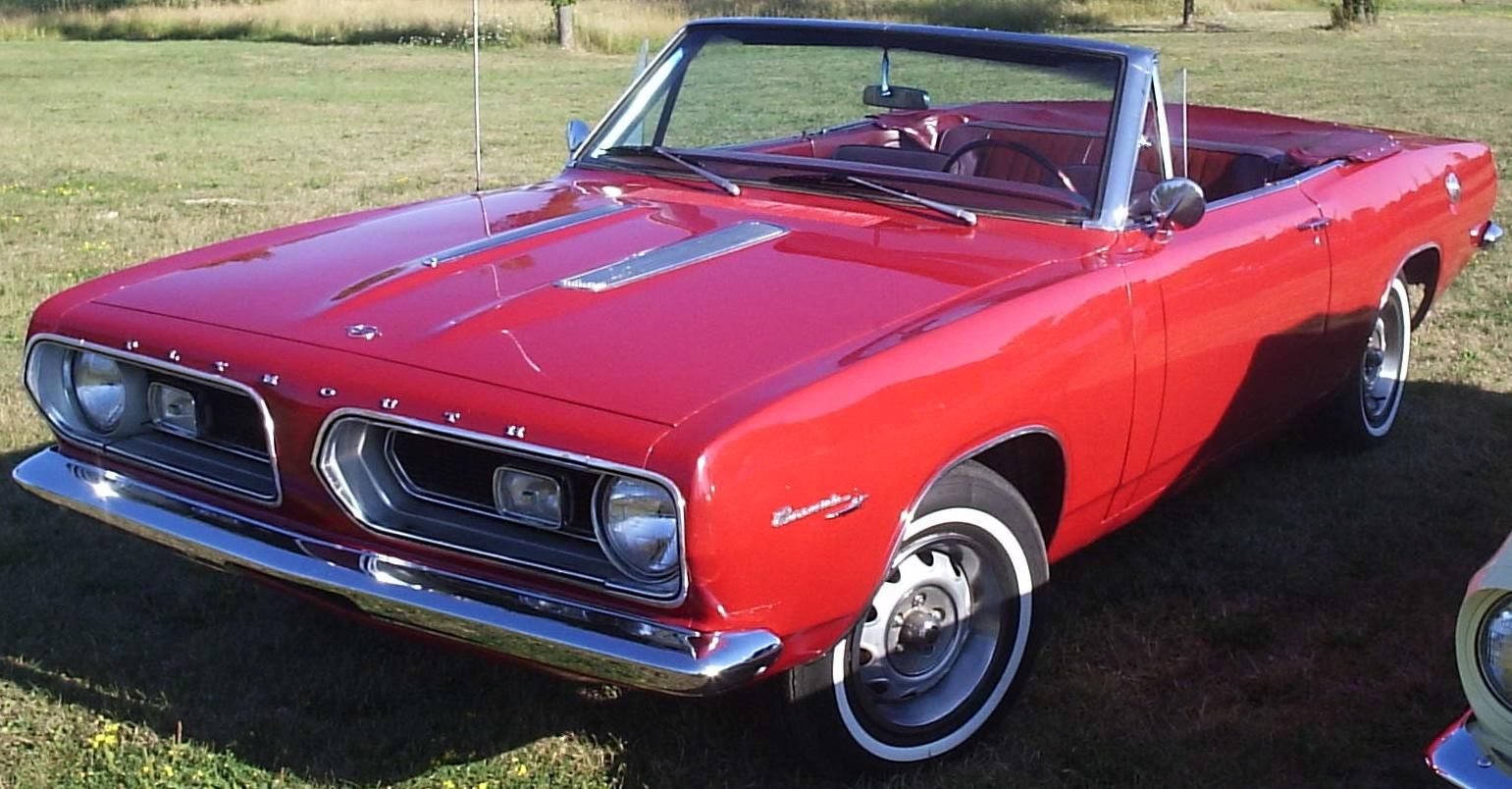
1967 Plymouth Barracuda

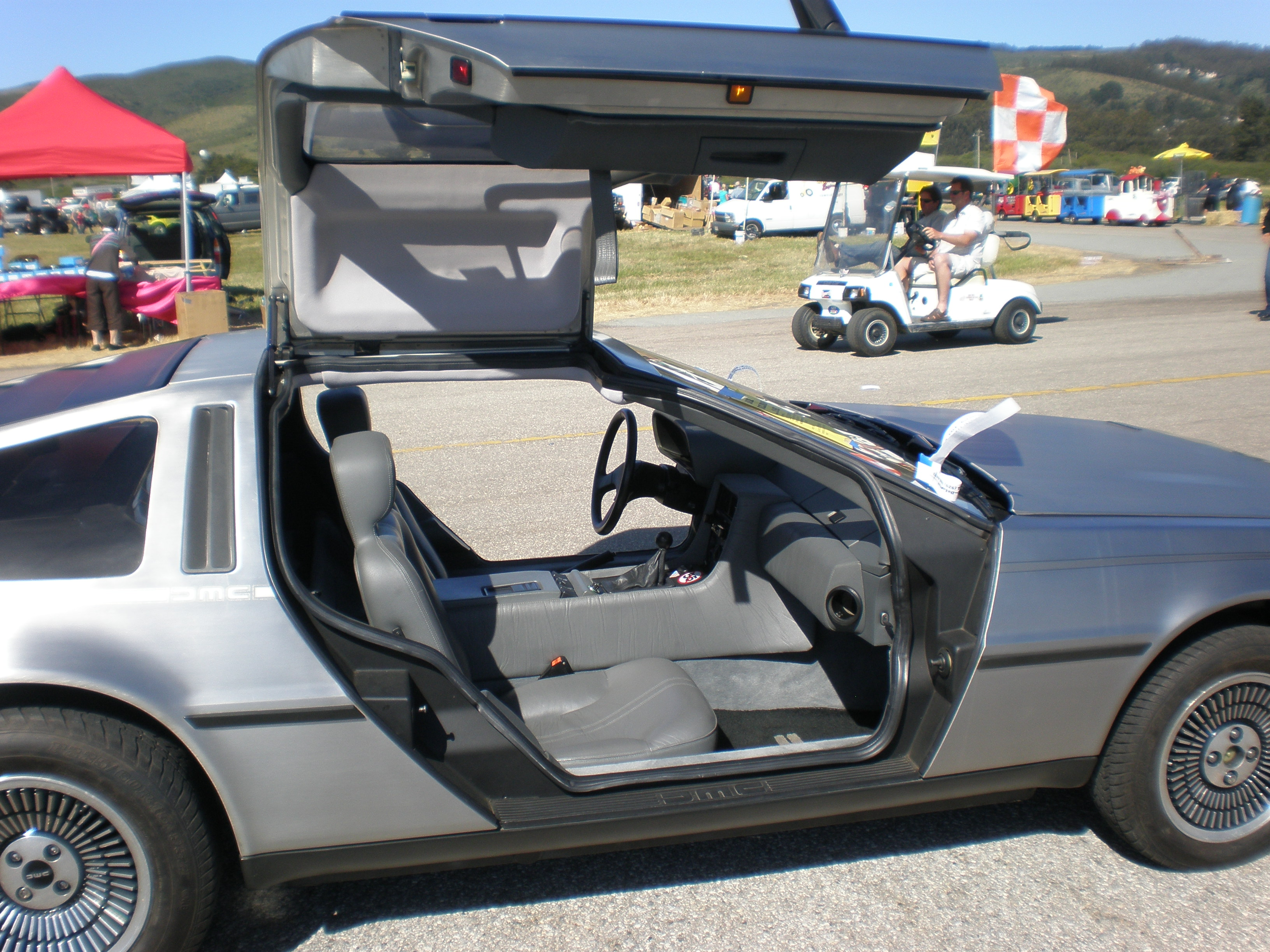
1982 DeLorean

Ronald Ray Hackenberger (born 1935 or 1936) is an American businessman and car collector. He began as a truck driver before running his own trucking business, then moved into ranching, real estate, and hospitality. He bought his first Studebaker at 15 and eventually amassed a collection of over 700 vehicles, including over 250 Studebakers, which were all sold at an auction in July 2017.

== Career ==
Hackenberger worked as a truck driver before starting his own trucking business, growing to 100 trucks and trailers.

Hackenberger sold the trucking business and then bought a cattle ranch in Texas. He also expanded into hospitality and real estate businesses. He now has a campground and catering service business in Ohio.

== Car collector ==
Hackenberger started collecting cars in 1962. He bought his first car, a 1948 Studebaker, at the age of 15, using a loan from his grandfather.

Apart from more than 250 vehicles made by Studebaker, Hackenberger's collection includes Hudsons, Kaisers and Packards, British and Italian roadsters, and French cars such as Citroen DSs and 2CVs, also a DeLorean and a Bricklin SV-1. His muscle cars include a 1965 Ford Mustang, a 1966 Dodge Charger, and a 1967 Plymouth Barracuda.

There are microcars, such as Crosleys, a Nash Metropolitan, a Goggomobil, a Honda N600s and Z600s and a BMW Isetta. There are 1940s motorcycles, John Deere tractors, Jaguars, and a Cadillac ambulance that looks like it came "straight out of Ghostbusters".

His Studebakers include Larks, Hawks, at least one Avanti, as well as horse-drawn buggies and wagons from the carmaker's early days.

Hackenberger had originally hoped to open a museum to display his car collection, before deciding to sell them. He sold all of his collection by auction, on July 15 and 16, 2017, in Norwalk, Ohio.

The auction raised over $2 million, with the top price being $37,800 for a 1947 Indian Chief motorcycle with sidecar, followed by $31,500 each for a 1965 Amphicar 770, a 1969 Jaguar E-Type Roadster, and a 1938 Studebaker pickup.

== Personal life ==
He married his wife, Eunice, in 1962. They have six daughters and live in Norwalk, Ohio.
