= Alice Blake =

American lawyer

Alice Rufie Jordan Blake
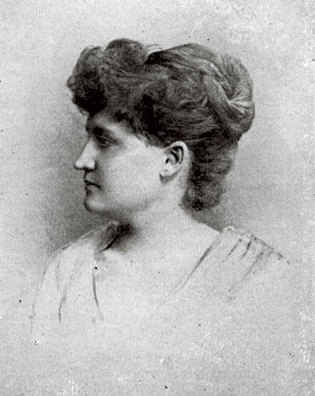
- in 1875
- Born: Alice Rufie Jordan; 10 October 1864; Norwalk, Ohio
- Died: 19 November 1893 (aged 29); Chicago
- Education: Yale University; Yale Law School; University of Michigan; University of Michigan Law School
- Occupation: Lawyer
- Known for: First female graduate of Yale University

Alice Rufie Jordan Blake (10 October 1864 - 29 November 1893) was the first female graduate of Yale University. After application and rejection from several other schools, she was able to enter Yale's law program after discovering that school regulations did not explicitly forbid female applicants.

== Early life ==
Alice Rufie Jordan was born in Norwalk, Ohio. After graduation from high school at the age of sixteen, she became the University of Michigan's youngest entrant to the literature program. At the age of 20, she entered the University of Michigan Law School, and before graduation passed the court test (an early type of bar exam) that enabled her to practice law in the state of Michigan.

== Time at Yale ==
Wanting to continue her studies, Jordan applied to Columbia Law School and Harvard Law School in 1885. After rejection from both male-only schools, she applied to Yale using her first initials. When she arrived to register, she faced opposition from the Corporation, but because the regulations did not explicitly prohibit female applicants, she was permitted to proceed with her studies. A year later, Blake graduated with a bachelor's of law in 1886 with the support of the faculty. While Blake was the first female graduate at Yale, she would remain as the only female law graduate until 1920. At the meeting with the Corporation where they approved the list of new law graduates, they noted that "it is to be understood that the courses of instruction [throughout Yale] are open to persons of the male sex only, except where both sexes are specifically included.”

== Marriage and death ==
Jordan married fellow lawyer George D. Blake in 1888, and moved to Seattle, Washington. She had been interviewed stating her desire to practice law even after her marriage. Jordan Blake died at the age of 29 in Chicago, Illinois in 1893.
