= Berlin Heights, Ohio =

- Village
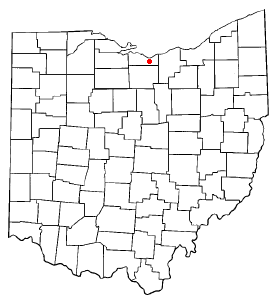
- Location of Berlin Heights, Ohio

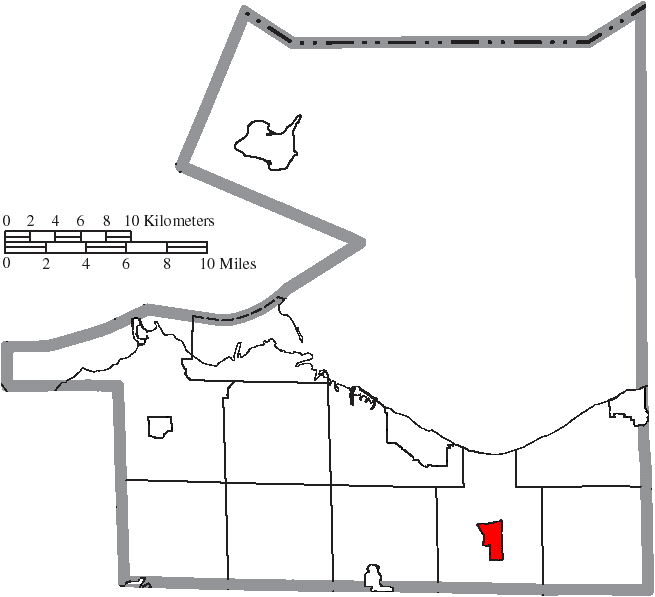
- Location of Berlin Heights in Erie County
- Coordinates: 41°19′24″N 82°29′33″W
- Country: United States
- State: Ohio
- County: Erie
- Township: Berlin

Government
  - Mayor: Connie L. Ward

Area
  - Total: 1.60 sq mi (4.15 km^{2})
  - Land: 1.60 sq mi (4.14 km^{2})
  - Water: 0 sq mi (0.00 km^{2})
- Elevation: 755 ft (230 m)

Population (2020)
  - Total: 651
  - Estimate (2023): 657
  - Density: 406.8/sq mi (157.06/km^{2})
- Time zone: UTC-5 (Eastern (EST))
  - Summer (DST): UTC-4 (EDT)
- ZIP code: 44814
- Area code: 419
- FIPS code: 39-05900
- GNIS feature ID: 2398104
- Website: villageofberlinheights.com

Berlin Heights (/ˈbɜːrlɪn/ BUR-lin) is a village in Berlin Township, Erie County, Ohio, United States. The population was 651 at the 2020 census. It is part of the Sandusky, Ohio Metropolitan Statistical Area.

== History ==
In the late 1850s a branch of the "free love" movement was established in Berlin Heights.

== Geography ==
Berlin Heights is located on State Route 61, about three miles south of Ceylon Junction and a mile north of Teaco Junction. Berlin Heights is also located between the cities of Norwalk and Vermilion.

According to the United States Census Bureau, the village has a total area of 1.60 square miles (4.14 km^{2}), all land.

== Demographics ==
Historical population
Census	Pop.	Note	%±
1880	424		—
1890	517		21.9%
1900	625		20.9%
1910	554		−11.4%
1920	514		−7.2%
1930	569		10.7%
1940	552		−3.0%
1950	613		11.1%
1960	721		17.6%
1970	828		14.8%
1980	756		−8.7%
1990	691		−8.6%
2000	685		−0.9%
2010	714		4.2%
2020	651		−8.8%
2023 (est.)	657	▲	0.9%
U.S. Decennial Census

=== 2010 census ===
As of the census of 2010, there were 714 people, 269 households, and 211 families living in the village. The population density was 446.3 inhabitants per square mile (172.3/km^{2}). There were 282 housing units at an average density of 176.3 per square mile (68.1/km^{2}). The racial makeup of the village was 96.8% White, 0.7% African American, 0.1% Native American, 0.1% Asian, and 2.2% from two or more races. Hispanic or Latino of any race were 1.4% of the population.

There were 269 households, of which 37.2% had children under the age of 18 living with them, 62.1% were married couples living together, 12.6% had a female householder with no husband present, 3.7% had a male householder with no wife present, and 21.6% were non-families. 20.1% of all households were made up of individuals, and 8.9% had someone living alone who was 65 years of age or older. The average household size was 2.65 and the average family size was 3.00.

The median age in the village was 40.2 years. 25.8% of residents were under the age of 18; 8% were between the ages of 18 and 24; 21.7% were from 25 to 44; 29.2% were from 45 to 64; and 15.4% were 65 years of age or older. The gender makeup of the village was 47.3% male and 52.7% female.

=== 2000 census ===
As of the census of 2000, there were 685 people, 257 households, and 200 families living in the village. The population density was 438.3 inhabitants per square mile (169.2/km^{2}). There were 266 housing units at an average density of 170.2 per square mile (65.7/km^{2}). The racial makeup of the village was 99.12% White, 0.29% from other races, and 0.58% from two or more races. Hispanic or Latino of any race were 1.46% of the population.

There were 257 households, out of which 38.5% had children under the age of 18 living with them, 65.4% were married couples living together, 10.5% had a female householder with no husband present, and 21.8% were non-families. 19.1% of all households were made up of individuals, and 7.0% had someone living alone who was 65 years of age or older. The average household size was 2.67 and the average family size was 3.02.

In the village, the population was spread out, with 28.6% under the age of 18, 6.1% from 18 to 24, 27.0% from 25 to 44, 24.4% from 45 to 64, and 13.9% who were 65 years of age or older. The median age was 38 years. For every 100 females there were 97.4 males. For every 100 females age 18 and over, there were 94.0 males.

The median income for a household in the village was $47,778, and the median income for a family was $51,750. Males had a median income of $43,750 versus $18,875 for females. The per capita income for the village was $19,102. About 5.4% of families and 6.9% of the population were below the poverty line, including 9.5% of those under age 18 and 4.3% of those age 65 or over.

== Education ==
The local school system is Edison Local Schools, as Berlin Township and Milan Township merged their separate school systems in the 1960s. The local high school is Edison High School, and the athletic teams are known as the Edison Chargers.

== Notable people ==
- Paul Drennan Cravath, lawyer
- Lemon G. Hine (1832–1914), politician and lawyer in Washington, D.C.
- Lizzie Holmes, anarchist, editor
- Emma Rood Tuttle, author
- Hudson Tuttle, spiritualist, father of the talking board
