= Norwalk, Ohio =

City in Huron County, Ohio, US

- City
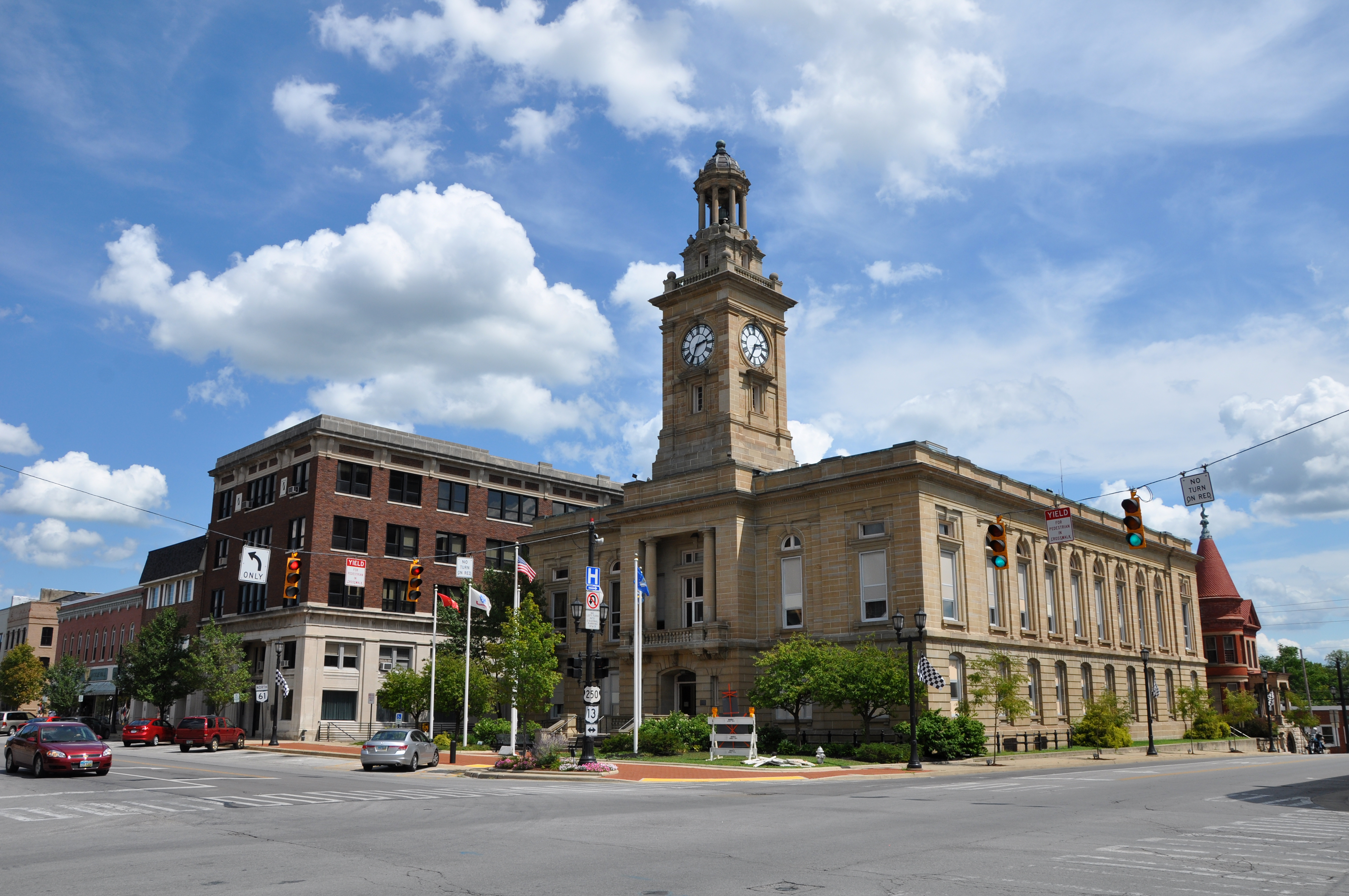
- Huron County Courthouse and Jail

- Flag Logo
- Nickname: The Maple City
- Interactive map of Norwalk, Ohio
- Location within Ohio Location within the United States
- Coordinates: 41°14′40″N 82°36′32″W
- Country: United States
- State: Ohio
- County: Huron
- Founded: 1817

Government
  - Mayor: David W. Light

Area
  - Total: 9.15 sq mi (23.69 km^{2})
  - Land: 8.86 sq mi (22.96 km^{2})
  - Water: 0.28 sq mi (0.73 km^{2})
- Elevation: 715 ft (218 m)

Population (2020)
  - Total: 17,068
  - Density: 1,925.3/sq mi (743.36/km^{2})
- Time zone: UTC-5 (Eastern (EST))
  - Summer (DST): UTC-4 (EDT)
- ZIP code: 44857
- Area codes: 419, 567
- FIPS code: 39-57302
- GNIS feature ID: 1086352
- Website: http://www.norwalkoh.com/

Norwalk is a city in Huron County, Ohio, United States, and its county seat. The population was 17,068 at the 2020 census. The city is the center of the Norwalk micropolitan area and part of the Cleveland–Akron–Canton combined statistical area. Norwalk is located approximately 10 miles (16 km) south of Lake Erie, 51 miles (82 km) west/southwest of Cleveland, 59 miles (95 km) southeast of Toledo, and 58 miles (93 km) west/northwest of Akron.

== History ==
On July 11, 1779, Norwalk, Connecticut, was burned by British Loyalists under Lieutenant-general William Tryon. In 1800, the U.S. federal government gave an area in the Connecticut Western Reserve as compensation; and in 1806, 13 men arrived to make the first survey of what would be called the Firelands.

Between 1806 and 1810, many families made the trip to look over land they had purchased in the Firelands. During the War of 1812, because of the fear of British and Indian raids, settlement of the Huron County area came almost to a standstill. However, in 1815, Platt Benedict of Danbury, Connecticut, visited and examined the present site of Norwalk. He returned to Danbury and purchased 1,300 acres (5.3 km^{2}) of land with an eye toward establishing a town.

In July 1817, Benedict returned to Norwalk with his family and immediately built a house. This was the first permanent residence established within the limits of Norwalk. In May 1818, the county seat was successfully removed from Avery, Ohio, to Norwalk.

Benedict was the first white permanent settler in Norwalk, when he came with his wife, Sarah DeForest, and their children. His descendants remained prominent in the area. On January 19, 1936, the Sandusky Daily Register published the obituary of John L. Severance, the multi-millionaire businessman and Standard Oil founding member. In the obituary, he is listed as "a great grandson of Platt Benedict, one of the founders of [Norwalk, Ohio]".

Among the earliest settlers of Norwalk were other men of wealth and education. They brought with them not only the customs, but also the architecture of New England. Many of their homes are still standing today. In 1881, Norwalk's population reached the required minimum to incorporate as a city, and the City of Norwalk dates from April 12, 1881.

The gastroenteritis-causing virus norovirus is named after the city. It was initially named the "Norwalk Agent". The virus was discovered via electron microscopy of a stool sample from the town in 1972.

== Geography ==
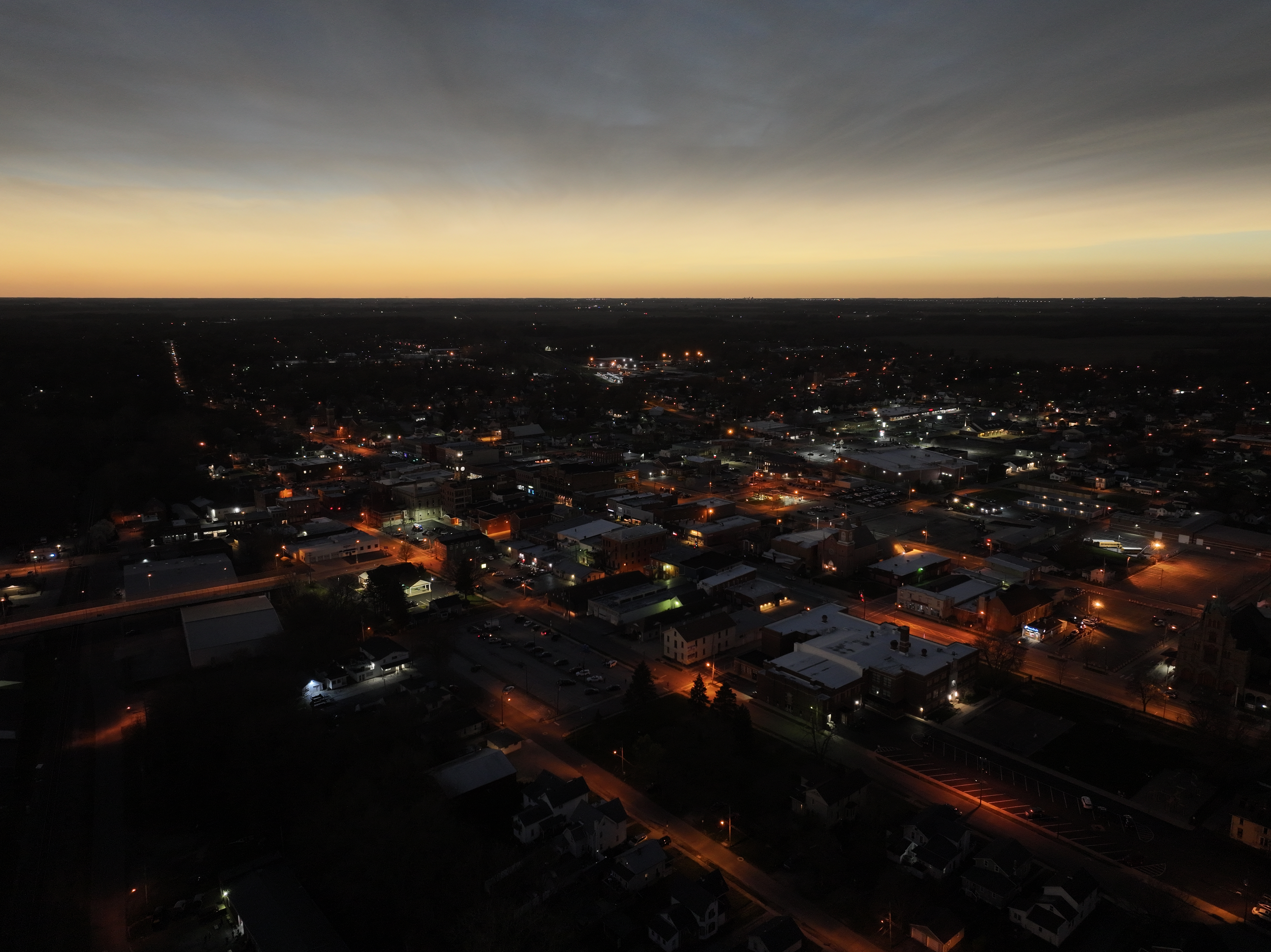
Downtown Norwalk during the 2024 Total Eclipse

Norwalk is located at the center of the Firelands, a subregion of the Connecticut Western Reserve. The subregion's name recalls the founding of the area as one for settlers from cities in Connecticut that were largely destroyed by fire during the Revolutionary War. Several locations in the Firelands were named in honor of those cities, including Danbury, Greenwich, Groton, New Haven, New London, Norwalk, Norwich, and Ridgefield. Other locations were named for the settlers, including Clarksfield, Perkins, and Sherman.

According to the United States Census Bureau, the city has a total area of 9.15 square miles (23.70 km^{2}), of which 8.87 square miles (22.97 km^{2}) is land and 0.28 square miles (0.73 km^{2}) is water. The city of Norwalk is bound by Norwalk Township in each direction and a small portion of the west side is bound by Ridgefield Township. The city is located approximately 12 miles (19 km) south of Lake Erie.

=== Climate ===
Climate data for Norwalk, Ohio, 1991–2020 normals, extremes 1894–present
| Month | Jan | Feb | Mar | Apr | May | Jun | Jul | Aug | Sep | Oct | Nov | Dec | Year |
|---|---|---|---|---|---|---|---|---|---|---|---|---|---|
| Record high °F (°C) | 72 (22) | 75 (24) | 85 (29) | 92 (33) | 98 (37) | 103 (39) | 108 (42) | 104 (40) | 102 (39) | 92 (33) | 82 (28) | 73 (23) | 108 (42) |
| Mean maximum °F (°C) | 58.4 (14.7) | 60.0 (15.6) | 69.6 (20.9) | 80.7 (27.1) | 86.7 (30.4) | 92.9 (33.8) | 93.2 (34.0) | 91.7 (33.2) | 89.6 (32.0) | 81.9 (27.7) | 69.5 (20.8) | 60.1 (15.6) | 94.6 (34.8) |
| Mean daily maximum °F (°C) | 33.4 (0.8) | 36.2 (2.3) | 45.5 (7.5) | 58.7 (14.8) | 70.2 (21.2) | 79.3 (26.3) | 83.0 (28.3) | 81.3 (27.4) | 75.5 (24.2) | 63.3 (17.4) | 49.7 (9.8) | 38.5 (3.6) | 59.6 (15.3) |
| Daily mean °F (°C) | 26.2 (−3.2) | 28.3 (−2.1) | 36.7 (2.6) | 48.4 (9.1) | 60.1 (15.6) | 69.5 (20.8) | 73.3 (22.9) | 71.4 (21.9) | 65.0 (18.3) | 53.3 (11.8) | 41.7 (5.4) | 31.8 (−0.1) | 50.5 (10.3) |
| Mean daily minimum °F (°C) | 19.0 (−7.2) | 20.4 (−6.4) | 27.9 (−2.3) | 38.1 (3.4) | 49.9 (9.9) | 59.8 (15.4) | 63.6 (17.6) | 61.6 (16.4) | 54.5 (12.5) | 43.3 (6.3) | 33.7 (0.9) | 25.1 (−3.8) | 41.4 (5.2) |
| Mean minimum °F (°C) | −1.2 (−18.4) | 3.2 (−16.0) | 11.2 (−11.6) | 24.9 (−3.9) | 35.4 (1.9) | 45.1 (7.3) | 52.4 (11.3) | 50.5 (10.3) | 41.2 (5.1) | 30.2 (−1.0) | 19.7 (−6.8) | 7.7 (−13.5) | −4.0 (−20.0) |
| Record low °F (°C) | −23 (−31) | −25 (−32) | −15 (−26) | 7 (−14) | 19 (−7) | 29 (−2) | 34 (1) | 35 (2) | 23 (−5) | 12 (−11) | −2 (−19) | −17 (−27) | −25 (−32) |
| Average precipitation inches (mm) | 2.68 (68) | 2.31 (59) | 2.90 (74) | 3.95 (100) | 3.91 (99) | 4.31 (109) | 4.19 (106) | 3.54 (90) | 3.55 (90) | 3.34 (85) | 2.83 (72) | 2.57 (65) | 40.08 (1,017) |
| Average snowfall inches (cm) | 9.7 (25) | 8.2 (21) | 5.1 (13) | 1.6 (4.1) | 0.0 (0.0) | 0.0 (0.0) | 0.0 (0.0) | 0.0 (0.0) | 0.0 (0.0) | 0.0 (0.0) | 1.5 (3.8) | 6.6 (17) | 32.7 (83.9) |
| Average precipitation days (≥ 0.01 in) | 13.7 | 11.6 | 11.9 | 13.2 | 13.0 | 11.5 | 10.2 | 9.9 | 9.4 | 10.8 | 10.4 | 11.9 | 137.5 |
| Average snowy days (≥ 0.1 in) | 7.8 | 6.6 | 3.6 | 0.9 | 0.0 | 0.0 | 0.0 | 0.0 | 0.0 | 0.0 | 1.3 | 4.9 | 25.1 |
Source 1: NOAA
Source 2: National Weather Service

== Demographics ==
Historical population
| Census | Pop. | Note | %± |
|---|---|---|---|
| 1820 | 179 | | — |
| 1830 | 310 | | 73.2% |
| 1840 | 1,113 | | 259.0% |
| 1850 | 1,437 | | 29.1% |
| 1860 | 2,839 | | 97.6% |
| 1870 | 4,498 | | 58.4% |
| 1880 | 5,704 | | 26.8% |
| 1890 | 7,195 | | 26.1% |
| 1900 | 7,074 | | −1.7% |
| 1910 | 7,858 | | 11.1% |
| 1920 | 7,379 | | −6.1% |
| 1930 | 7,776 | | 5.4% |
| 1940 | 8,211 | | 5.6% |
| 1950 | 9,775 | | 19.0% |
| 1960 | 12,900 | | 32.0% |
| 1970 | 13,386 | | 3.8% |
| 1980 | 14,348 | | 7.2% |
| 1990 | 14,731 | | 2.7% |
| 2000 | 16,238 | | 10.2% |
| 2010 | 17,012 | | 4.8% |
| 2020 | 17,068 | | 0.3% |

=== 2020 census ===
As of the 2020 census, Norwalk had a population of 17,068. The median age was 40.0 years. 23.3% of residents were under the age of 18 and 19.2% of residents were 65 years of age or older. For every 100 females there were 91.3 males, and for every 100 females age 18 and over there were 87.7 males age 18 and over.

99.5% of residents lived in urban areas, while 0.5% lived in rural areas.

There were 7,169 households in Norwalk, of which 28.1% had children under the age of 18 living in them. Of all households, 40.5% were married-couple households, 18.5% were households with a male householder and no spouse or partner present, and 32.2% were households with a female householder and no spouse or partner present. About 33.6% of all households were made up of individuals and 15.6% had someone living alone who was 65 years of age or older.

There were 7,753 housing units, of which 7.5% were vacant. The homeowner vacancy rate was 1.9% and the rental vacancy rate was 7.0%.

Racial composition as of the 2020 census
| Race | Number | Percent |
|---|---|---|
| White | 14,755 | 86.4% |
| Black or African American | 318 | 1.9% |
| American Indian and Alaska Native | 60 | 0.4% |
| Asian | 117 | 0.7% |
| Native Hawaiian and Other Pacific Islander | 3 | 0.0% |
| Some other race | 483 | 2.8% |
| Two or more races | 1,332 | 7.8% |
| Hispanic or Latino (of any race) | 1,480 | 8.7% |

=== 2010 census ===
As of the census of 2010, there were 17,012 people, 6,764 households, and 4,385 families living in the city. The population density was 1,917.9 inhabitants per square mile (740.5/km^{2}). There were 7,446 housing units at an average density of 839.5 per square mile (324.1/km^{2}). The racial makeup of the city was 92.2% White, 1.9% African American, 0.2% Native American, 0.5% Asian, 3.2% from other races, and 2.1% from two or more races. Hispanic or Latino of any race were 7.2% of the population.

There were 6,764 households, of which 34.0% had children under the age of 18 living with them, 45.1% were married couples living together, 14.8% had a female householder with no husband present, 5.0% had a male householder with no wife present, and 35.2% were non-families. 29.6% of all households were made up of individuals, and 12.2% had someone living alone who was 65 years of age or older. The average household size was 2.46 and the average family size was 3.02.

The median age in the city was 37 years. 26.2% of residents were under the age of 18; 8.5% were between the ages of 18 and 24; 25.6% were from 25 to 44; 25.2% were from 45 to 64; and 14.6% were 65 years of age or older. The gender makeup of the city was 47.8% male and 52.2% female.

=== 2000 census ===
At the 2000 census, there were 16,238 people, 6,377 households and 4,234 families living in the city. The population density was 1,950.3 inhabitants per square mile (753.0/km^{2}). There were 6,687 housing units at an average density of 803.1 per square mile (310.1/km^{2}). The racial makeup of the city was 94.53% White, 1.95% African American, 0.22% Native American, 0.32% Asian, 1.86% from other races, and 1.13% from two or more races. Hispanic or Latino of any race were 3.82% of the population.

There were 6,377 households, of which 34.7% had children under the age of 18 living with them, 49.9% were married couples living together, 12.7% had a female householder with no husband present, and 33.6% were non-families. 28.5% of all households were made up of individuals, and 11.9% had someone living alone who was 65 years of age or older. The average household size was 2.49 and the average family size was 3.06.

Age distribution was 27.9% under the age of 18, 9.1% from 18 to 24, 28.9% from 25 to 44, 19.8% from 45 to 64, and 14.2% who were 65 years of age or older. The median age was 34 years. For every 100 females, there were 91.5 males. For every 100 females age 18 and over, there were 86.1 males.

The median household income was $37,778, and the median family income was $45,789. Males had a median income of $36,582 versus $22,165 for females. The per capita income for the city was $18,519. About 6.8% of families and 8.8% of the population were below the poverty line, including 11.1% of those under age 18 and 6.0% of those age 65 or over.

== Education ==
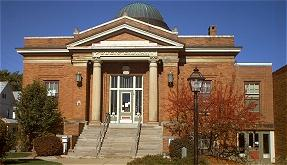
Norwalk Public Library

Due to city annexations and previously determined school district boundaries, Norwalk is served by four public school districts. The majority of the city is served by the Norwalk City School District. Outlying portions of the city are also served by the Edison Local, Monroeville Local and Western Reserve Local School Districts.

Norwalk is also home to multiple religious schools, including Norwalk Catholic Schools / Saint Paul High School (Roman Catholic), and Trinity Christian Academy.

== Infrastructure ==
=== Transportation ===
Interstates 80 and 90, also known as the Ohio Turnpike, are approximately 3.5 miles (5.6 km) north of Norwalk's city limits with an interchange at U.S. Route 250. The U.S. highways that run through Norwalk include U.S. Route 20 and U.S. Route 250. State highways that run through Norwalk include Ohio State Route 13, State Route 18, and State Route 61. Furthermore, State Route 601 is an alternate two-lane highway that acts as a de facto eastern bypass of Norwalk and US 250, running from State Route 113 at Milan to State Route 18 southeast of Norwalk.

The Norwalk-Huron County Airport is located three nautical miles (3.5 mi; 5.6 km) east of Norwalk's central business district.

One active freight railroad line runs through Norwalk, the Wheeling and Lake Erie Railroad.

== Notable people ==
- Fred Baker — founder of Scripps Institution of Oceanography
- Alice Rufie Jordan Blake — first female law graduate at Yale
- Paul Brown — Hall of Fame American football coach
- Ray Gandolf — sportscaster
- Lefty Grove — Hall of Fame baseball pitcher
- Ron Hackenberger — car collector, with 700 vehicles in Norwalk
- Frank Avery Hutchins — librarian
- Ban Johnson — first president of baseball's American League
- George Kennan — journalist and critic of the Russian exile system
- Vahdah Olcott-Bickford — classical guitarist
- Dennis A. Reed — member of the Wisconsin State Assembly
- Stephen M. Young — Ohio U.S. Senator and House member
