= National Register of Historic Places listings in Erie County, Ohio =

Location of Erie County in Ohio

This is a list of the National Register of Historic Places listings in Erie County, Ohio.

This is intended to be a complete list of the properties and districts on the National Register of Historic Places in Erie County, Ohio, United States. Latitude and longitude coordinates are provided for many National Register properties and districts; these locations may be seen together in an online map.

There are 179 properties and districts listed on the National Register in the county, including 2 National Historic Landmarks. The city of Sandusky is the location of 114 of these properties and districts; they are listed separately, while the remaining 65 sites, including both National Historic Landmarks, are listed here.

This National Park Service list is complete through NPS recent listings posted February 27, 2026.

== Current listings ==
=== Outside Sandusky ===
	Name on the Register	Image	Date listed	Location	City or town	Description
1	Abbott-Page House	Abbott-Page House	May 27, 1975 (#75001383)	2.5 mi (4.0 km) northeast of Milan on Mason Rd. 41°20′12″N 82°35′02″W	Milan Township	
2	Ebenezer Andrews House	Ebenezer Andrews House	July 25, 1974 (#74001467)	200 S. Main St. 41°17′27″N 82°35′59″W	Milan	
3	ANTHONY WAYNE Shipwreck	ANTHONY WAYNE Shipwreck	January 2, 2018 (#100001932)	About 8 miles north of Vermilion; 41°31′00″N 82°23′00″W	Vermilion	A 156-foot sidewheel steamer that was built in 1837 by Samuel L. Hubbel. She sank after her boilers exploded.
4	Barber Shop	Barber Shop	November 14, 1979 (#79003932)	Liberty Ave. west of Main St. 41°25′20″N 82°21′54″W	Vermilion	
5	Baxtine House	Baxtine House	November 14, 1979 (#79003920)	Junction of Ohio and Perry Sts. 41°25′11″N 82°22′08″W	Vermilion	
6	Louis Beatty House	Louis Beatty House	October 25, 1984 (#84000106)	South Shore Dr. 41°35′42″N 82°41′52″W	Kelleys Island	
7	Capt. Bradley's Second House	Capt. Bradley's Second House	November 14, 1979 (#79003946)	753 Decatur St. 41°25′13″N 82°22′09″W	Vermilion	
8	Capt. Alva Bradley House	Capt. Alva Bradley House	November 14, 1979 (#79003938)	5679 Huron St. 41°25′25″N 82°22′02″W	Vermilion	
9	Cyrus Butler House	Cyrus Butler House	March 17, 1976 (#76001416)	Edison Highway in Birmingham; 41°19′55″N 82°21′03″W	Florence Township	
10	Cargo Warehouse	Cargo Warehouse	November 14, 1979 (#79003941)	Liberty Ave., east of Exchange St. and west of Toledo St. 41°25′17″N 82°21′43″W	Vermilion	
11	Castalia Trout Club		December 2, 2019 (#100004704)	604 Washington St. 41°23′36″N 82°48′28″W	Castalia	
12	Christ Episcopal Church	Christ Episcopal Church	March 4, 1975 (#75001379)	Park and Ohio Sts. 41°23′52″N 82°33′19″W	Huron	
13	Dean Road Bridge	Dean Road Bridge	November 28, 1978 (#78002119)	West of South Amherst at Dean Rd. and the Vermilion River; 41°20′56″N 82°20′41″W	Florence Township	Extends into Lorain County
14	John Denzel House	John Denzel House	November 14, 1979 (#79003956)	831 Douglas St. 41°25′08″N 82°21′44″W	Vermilion	
15	Thomas Alva Edison Birthplace	Thomas Alva Edison Birthplace	October 15, 1966 (#66000608)	Edison Dr. 41°18′00″N 82°36′16″W	Milan	
16	Englebry's Dry Goods	Englebry's Dry Goods	November 14, 1979 (#79003951)	Main St., south of Liberty Ave. 41°25′18″N 82°21′53″W	Vermilion	
17	Dr. Englebry's Office	Dr. Englebry's Office	November 14, 1979 (#79003922)	Main St., south of Liberty Ave. 41°25′17″N 82°21′53″W	Vermilion	
18	Erie County Bank Building	Erie County Bank Building	November 14, 1979 (#79003953)	Junction of Liberty Ave. and Main St. 41°25′19″N 82°21′53″W	Vermilion	
19	Erie County Infirmary	Erie County Infirmary	September 5, 1975 (#75001387)	South of Sandusky on Columbus Rd. 41°25′38″N 82°41′38″W	Perkins Township	
20	Evangelical and Reformed Church	Evangelical and Reformed Church	November 14, 1979 (#79003960)	Junction of Grand and Ohio Sts. 41°25′13″N 82°21′59″W	Vermilion	
21	First Baptist Church	First Baptist Church	November 14, 1979 (#79003954)	728 Main St. 41°25′14″N 82°21′55″W	Vermilion	
22	Florence Corners School	Florence Corners School	March 19, 1975 (#75001378)	State Route 113 at Division St. in Florence; 41°19′20″N 82°24′55″W	Florence Township	
23	JOSEPH FRANCIS IRON SURF BOAT		September 13, 1979 (#79001829)	480 Main St. 41°25′29″N 82°22′00″W	Vermilion	
24	Capt. Gilchrist House	Capt. Gilchrist House	November 14, 1979 (#79003948)	5644 Huron St. 41°25′26″N 82°22′03″W	Vermilion	
25	Capt. Gilchrist Sr. House	Capt. Gilchrist Sr. House	November 14, 1979 (#79003921)	Junction of Ohio and Grand Sts. 41°25′11″N 82°21′57″W	Vermilion	
26	Great Lakes Historical Society Marine Museum	Great Lakes Historical Society Marine Museum	November 14, 1979 (#79003925)	Junction of Main and Huron Sts. 41°25′29″N 82°22′00″W	Vermilion	
27	Hart's Drug Store	Hart's Drug Store	November 14, 1979 (#79003934)	Junction of Main St. and Liberty Ave. 41°25′20″N 82°21′53″W	Vermilion	
28	Capt. Charles Horton House	Capt. Charles Horton House	November 14, 1979 (#79003926)	5564 Ferry St. 41°25′23″N 82°22′00″W	Vermilion	
29	House at 624 Washington St.	House at 624 Washington St.	November 14, 1979 (#79003940)	624 Washington St. 41°25′21″N 82°22′04″W	Vermilion	
30	House on Huron Ave.	House on Huron Ave.	November 14, 1979 (#79003942)	Junction of Huron and Washington Sts. 41°25′24″N 82°22′05″W	Vermilion	
31	Huron School	Huron School	June 15, 2011 (#11000366)	325 Ohio St. 41°23′43″N 82°33′32″W	Huron	Now McCormick Middle School
32	Inscription Rock	Inscription Rock	June 18, 1973 (#73001432)	Kelleys Island; 41°35′34″N 82°42′25″W	Kelleys Island	
33	Jenkins-Perry House	Jenkins-Perry House	October 29, 1974 (#74001468)	37 W. Front St. 41°17′51″N 82°36′31″W	Milan	
34	Kelleys Island South Shore District	Kelleys Island South Shore District	March 27, 1975 (#75001380)	Water St. on the southern side of Kelleys Island; also the entire island 41°35′44″N 82°43′05″W	Kelleys Island	"Entire island" represents a boundary increase of December 15, 1988, the Kelleys Island Historic District
35	Kishman Fish Company Buildings	Kishman Fish Company Buildings	November 14, 1979 (#79003959)	Main St., south of Huron St. and north of Liberty Ave. 41°25′22″N 82°21′51″W	Vermilion	
36	J.C. Lockwood House	J.C. Lockwood House	December 4, 1974 (#74001469)	30 Edison Dr. 41°18′04″N 82°36′14″W	Milan	
37	Masonic Temple Building	Masonic Temple Building	November 14, 1979 (#79003950)	Main St., south of Liberty St. 41°25′18″N 82°21′53″W	Vermilion	
38	Capt. Meyers House	Capt. Meyers House	November 14, 1979 (#79003923)	Junction of Ohio and Perry Sts. 41°25′13″N 82°22′08″W	Vermilion	
39	Milan Historic District	Milan Historic District	March 13, 1975 (#75001381)	Main and Church Sts., both sides of Front St., and Edison Dr. 41°17′56″N 82°36′17″W	Milan	
40	Capt. Minch House	Capt. Minch House	November 14, 1979 (#79003943)	743 Grand St. 41°25′13″N 82°21′57″W	Vermilion	
41	Mitchell Historic District	Mitchell Historic District	March 13, 1975 (#75001382)	115-137 and 118-136 Center St. 41°17′42″N 82°36′07″W	Milan	
42	Oakland Cemetery Chapel and Superintendent's House and Office	Oakland Cemetery Chapel and Superintendent's House and Office	May 6, 1983 (#83001962)	2917 Milan Rd., south of Sandusky; 41°25′48″N 82°41′11″W	Perkins Township	
43	Ohio Soldiers' and Sailors' Home	Ohio Soldiers' and Sailors' Home	September 13, 1976 (#76001418)	Southeast of Sandusky between U.S. Route 250 and S. Columbus Ave. 41°25′11″N 82°41′01″W	Perkins Township	
44	Old Funeral Parlor	Old Funeral Parlor	November 14, 1979 (#79003930)	5596 Liberty St. 41°25′20″N 82°21′57″W	Vermilion	
45	Old Harbour Store	Old Harbour Store	November 14, 1979 (#79003933)	Liberty Ave., west of Main St. 41°25′20″N 82°21′54″W	Vermilion	
46	Old Interurban Station	Old Interurban Station	November 14, 1979 (#79003936)	Junction of Liberty Ave. and Exchange St. 41°25′19″N 82°21′49″W	Vermilion	
47	Old Jib's Corner	Old Jib's Corner	November 14, 1979 (#79003937)	Junction of Liberty Ave. and Perry St. 41°25′19″N 82°22′06″W	Vermilion	
48	Old Mill	Old Mill	November 14, 1979 (#79003929)	Junction of Exchange and Mill Sts. 41°25′00″N 82°21′47″W	Vermilion	
49	Old Nickel Plate Railroad Depot	Old Nickel Plate Railroad Depot	November 14, 1979 (#79003958)	Junction of State Route 60 and Norfolk and Western railroad line 41°25′00″N 82°21′53″W	Vermilion	
50	Old Pelton Hotel	Old Pelton Hotel	November 14, 1979 (#79003952)	5780 Liberty Ave. 41°25′20″N 82°22′09″W	Vermilion	
51	Old Union School Building	Old Union School Building	November 14, 1979 (#79003957)	Junction of South and Mill Sts. 41°24′59″N 82°21′54″W	Vermilion	Demolished in 2024.
52	Old Vermilion Banking Company Building	Old Vermilion Banking Company Building	November 14, 1979 (#79003935)	5581 Liberty Ave. 41°25′19″N 82°21′55″W	Vermilion	
53	Old Vermilion Mill	Old Vermilion Mill	November 14, 1979 (#79003928)	Douglas St. 41°25′01″N 82°21′45″W	Vermilion	
54	Pelton House	Pelton House	November 14, 1979 (#79003944)	5345 South St. 41°25′08″N 82°21′46″W	Vermilion	
55	Capt. Rae House	Capt. Rae House	November 14, 1979 (#79003939)	690 Decatur St. 41°25′17″N 82°22′12″W	Vermilion	
56	Sail Loft	Sail Loft	November 14, 1979 (#79003927)	Main St., south of Ferry St. 41°25′24″N 82°21′54″W	Vermilion	
57	St. Mary Parish Hall	St. Mary Parish Hall	November 14, 1979 (#79003931)	Exchange St. 41°25′15″N 82°21′48″W	Vermilion	
58	Spacecraft Propulsion Research Facility	Spacecraft Propulsion Research Facility	October 3, 1985 (#85002802)	Lewis Research Center, Plum Brook Station; 41°22′01″N 82°41′01″W	Oxford and Perkins Townships	
59	Stagecoach Inn	Stagecoach Inn	November 14, 1979 (#79003924)	5798 Huron St. 41°25′24″N 82°22′11″W	Vermilion	
60	Starr-Truscott House	Starr-Truscott House	April 20, 1978 (#78002056)	State Route 133 in Birmingham; 41°19′52″N 82°21′20″W	Florence Township	
61	Steamboat Hotel	Steamboat Hotel	November 14, 1979 (#79003947)	532 Main St. 41°25′26″N 82°21′58″W	Vermilion	
62	The Stone House	The Stone House	October 28, 2010 (#10000874)	8217 Mason Rd., northeast of Berlin Heights; 41°20′14″N 82°28′34″W	Berlin Township	
63	Vermilion Town Hall	Vermilion Town Hall	November 20, 1974 (#74001474)	736 Main St. 41°25′13″N 82°21′54″W	Vermilion	
64	Capt. Henry Walper House	Capt. Henry Walper House	November 14, 1979 (#79003955)	5475 South St. 41°25′08″N 82°21′50″W	Vermilion	
65	Capt. Young House	Capt. Young House	November 14, 1979 (#79003945)	Junction of Decatur and Ohio Sts. 41°25′11″N 82°22′12″W	Vermilion	

== See also ==
- List of National Historic Landmarks in Ohio
- Listings in neighboring counties: Huron, Lorain, Ottawa, Sandusky
- National Register of Historic Places listings in Ohio
