= Raymond Charles Vietzen =

American automobile dealer, artifact collector, and amateur archaeologist (1907–1995)

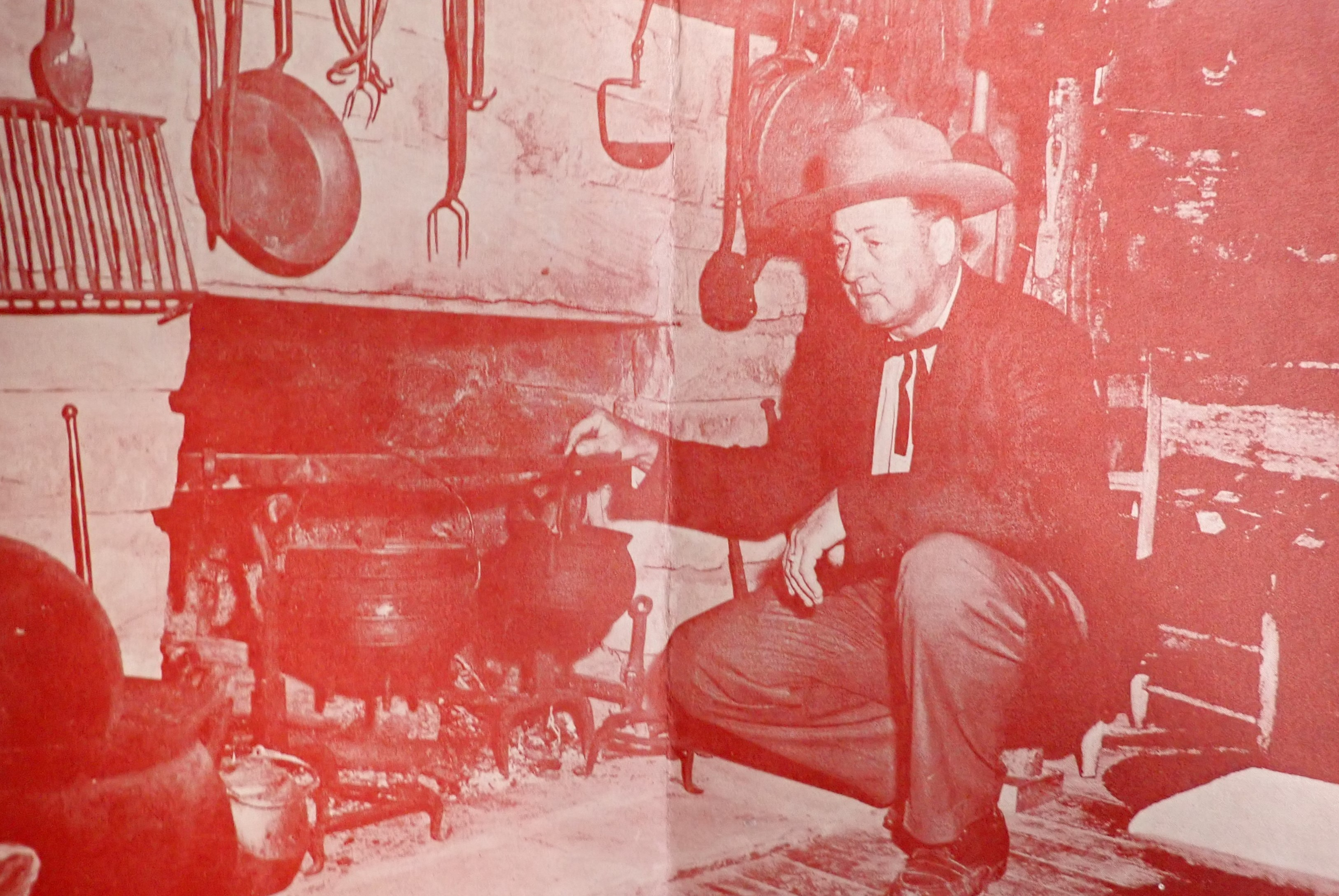
Col. Vietzen at the hearth in Honeysuckle Cabin

Raymond Charles Vietzen was an American automobile dealer, artifact collector, and amateur archaeologist. As prolific author and artist from Elyria, Ohio, he wrote and illustrated numerous articles, books, and chapters in edited volumes on the history and prehistory of North America winning him many honors—chief among them the title of "Colonel." Col. Vietzen is probably best known for establishing the Indian Ridge Museum in 1930 and for founding the Archaeological Society of Ohio (formerly the Ohio Indian Relic Collectors Society), whereby he presided as its editor, president, secretary, and treasurer from 1941 to 1980. Most of his publications are dedicated to the excavations that he led at many famous archaeological sites in Illinois, Kentucky, Ohio, Oklahoma, and Tennessee. His relic collection was sold by Old Barn Auction between 1998 and 1999 grossing $1,777,652. In 2000, Colonel Matthew W. Nahorn founded the New Indian Ridge Museum in Amherst, Ohio, celebrating Col. Vietzen's legacy. However, Col. Vietzen has received criticism for digging Native American graves, as well as the sale and trade of antiquities.

== Publications ==
Vietzen was an authority on archaeology, geography, and history of the midwestern and eastern United States, particularly for Kentucky, Illinois, Ohio, Oklahoma, and Tennessee, between 1941 and 1995. He penned over 35 publications. They include at least 17 books, 14 peer-reviewed scholarly articles, and 4 chapters in edited academic volumes. Many of these are available at public libraries or online.

- Vietzen, Raymond (1941). Ancient Man in Ohio. Lorain, Ohio: McCahon Printers.
- Vietzen, Raymond (1945). The Immortal Eries. Elyria, Ohio: Wilmot Printing Company.
- Vietzen, Raymond (1946). The Ancient Ohioans and Their Neighbors. Wahoo, Nebraska: Ludi Printing Company.
- Vietzen, Raymond (1946). "Birdstones and their probable use". Journal of the Illinois State Archaeological Society. 4 (2): 15–30.
- Vietzen, Raymond (1946). "Prehistory of the Black River Valley." Ohio Indian Relic Collectors Society Bulletin 15: 6–9.
- Vietzen, Raymond (1946). "Fraternizing with the ancient Kentuckians". Ohio Indian Relic Collectors Society Bulletin. 16: 3–13.
- Vietzen, Raymond (1946). "Along the Sandusky." https://www.worldcat.org/title/2265415Society Bulletin 17: 6, 8.
- Vietzen, Raymond (1946). "Morrison site." Ohio Indian Relic Collectors Society Bulletin 17: 8, 10.
- Vietzen, Raymond (1947). "Petroglyphs on the Ohio." Ohio Indian Relic Collectors Society Bulletin 19: 10–16.
- Vietzen, Raymond (1948). "Prehistoric pipes from Lorain County, Ohio." Ohio Indian Relic Collectors Society Bulletin 20: 9–10.
- Vietzen, Raymond (1949). "The Hasler mound." Ohio Indian Relic Collectors Society Bulletin 21: 1–14.
- Vietzen, Raymond (1950). Grimm, Robert (ed.) "My first visit to Cahokia." Cahokia Brought to Life: An Artifactual Story of America's Great Monument. St. Louis, Missouri: Greater St. Louis Archaeological Society. pp. 70–72.
- Vietzen, Raymond (1952). "Cave crawln’." Ohio Archaeologist [N.S.] 2 (3): 31.
- Vietzen, Raymond (1952). "A magnificent birdstone." Ohio Archaeologist [N.S.] 2 (3): 32–34.
- Vietzen, Raymond (1953). "A birdstone study." Ohio Archaeologist [N.S.] 3 (2): 30–34.
- Vietzen, Raymond (1956). The Saga of Glover's Cave. Wahoo, Nebraska: Ludi Printing Company.
- Vietzen, Raymond (1965). Indians of the Lake Erie Basin, or Lost Nations. Wahoo, Nebraska: Ludi Printing Company.
- Vietzen, Raymond (1966). Aborigines of Cansadooharie. Ohio Genealogical Society Report 6 (2): 3.
- Vietzen, Raymond (1967). "Lorain County's Indians." Pathways of the Pioneers 2 (3).
- Vietzen, Raymond (1968). Sittin' on Stump. Elyria, Ohio: Indian Ridge Museum.
- Vietzen, Raymond (1973). Yesterday's Ohioans. Elyria, Ohio: Indian Ridge Museum.
- Vietzen, Raymond (1974). The Riker Site. Bolivar, Ohio: Archaeological Society of Ohio.
- Vietzen, Raymond (1974). Lorain County Historical Society (ed.) "Prologue." Lorain County Sesquicentennial. Elyria, Ohio: American Multi-Service. pp. 6–7.
- Vietzen, Raymond (1974). Lorain County Historical Society (ed.) "Indian Ridge Museum." Lorain County Sesquicentennial. Elyria, Ohio: American Multi-Service. p. 17.
- Vietzen, Raymond (1976). Shakin' the Bushes: From Paleo to Historic Indians. Elyria, Ohio: White Horse.
- Vietzen, Raymond (1978). From the Earth They Came. Elyria, Ohio: White Horse.
- Vietzen, Raymond (1980). "Fakes." Ohio Archaeologist 30 (4): 37–39.
- Vietzen, Raymond (1981). The Old Warrior Speaks. Elyria, Ohio: White Horse.
- Vietzen, Raymond (1984). Their Fires Are Cold. Elyria, Ohio: White Horse.
- Vietzen, Raymond (1987). Archaeology around the Great Lakes: Also Gen. G.A. Custer and the Indian Leaders. Beverly, Ohio: White Horse.
- Vietzen, Raymond (1988). Rothgery, James and Glendening, Anne (eds.) "Sheffield." Kipton-Camden Township History. Wellington, Ohio: Camden Historical Society.
- Vietzen, Raymond (1989). Prehistoric Americans. Elyria, Ohio: White Horse.
- Vietzen, Raymond (1992). My Life and Philosophy as an Archaeologist, Author, Artist. Elyria, Ohio: White Horse.
- Vietzen, Raymond (1994). I Touched the Indians Past: Prehistoric Era. Elyria, Ohio: White Horse.
- Vietzen, Raymond (1995). Prehistoric Indians: From Darkness into Light. Elyria, Ohio: White Horse.

== Honors ==
Col. Veitzen received numerous awards and honors for his accomplishments. For his achievements as an artist, author, archaeologist, artifact collector, historian, he 14 accolades were bestowed upon him. Some of the most prestigious are listed below.

- Eugene Field Society, 1941
- International Mark Twain Society, as well as the American Academy of Political and Social Science, 1944
- Honorary "Kentucky Colonel" and "Citizen of Tennessee" by gubernatorial commissions 1957
- Ohioana Author Award, 1962
- Kentucky Historical Society by the state's legislature, 1969
- "Who's Who in American Education," 1962–1965
- "Who's Who in Antiquities," 1972
- International "Who's Who in Art," 1973
- Ohio Sesquicentennial Committee for Lorain County by gubernatorial commission, 1974
- "Who's Who in America," 1975
- "Man of Achievement" by the Ohio State House of Representatives, 1981
- Lifetime Member of the Lorain County Historical Society
- The Founding Fathers of the Archaeological Society of Ohio

== Excavations ==
Col. Veitzen excavated hundreds of archaeological sites in the U.S. Among his contributions to knowledge are 15 well-known areas of interest archaeologically and historically in Kentucky, Illinois, Ohio, Oklahoma, and Tennessee. They have Smithsonian trinomial designations. For example, Cahokia, a UNESCO World Heritage Site, is 11MS2 with "11" for state of Illinois, "MS" for Madison County, and "2" for the second site to be documented therein.

- Spiro Mounds (34LF40) LeFlore County, Oklahoma, 1936
- Page Site (15LO1) Lewisburg, Logan County, Kentucky, 1938–1942
- Moes Site (33LN55) Brownhelm, Lorain County, Ohio, 1940
- Seaman's Fort Site (33ER85) Milan, Erie County, Ohio, 1940–1942
- Morris-Franks Site(33LN8) Brownhelm, Lorain County, Ohio, 1941–1942
- Glover's Cave (15CH315) Trenton, Christian County, Kentucky, 1941–1955
- Cahokia (11MS2) Collinsville, Madison County, Illinois, 1949
- Pennington Bend sites at Two Rivers (40DV41, 40DV101, 40DV304, and 40DV566), Nashville, Davidson County, Tennessee, 1950
- Eiden Archaeological District (33LN14, 33LN40, 33LN46) Sheffield, Lorain County, Ohio, 1958–1959
- Riker Site (33TU2) Midvale, Tuscarawas County, Ohio, 1965–1967
