= Libby Black =

American contemporary artist

- Born: 1976 (age 49–50); Toledo, Ohio, U.S.
- Education: B.F.A. – Cleveland Institute of Art; M.F.A. – California College of the Arts
- Known for: drawings, paintings, sculptures
- Website: www.libbyblack.com

Libby Black (born in 1976, Toledo, Ohio) is an American contemporary artist working primarily in drawing, painting, and sculpture. Black lives and works in Berkeley, California.

== Education ==
Black holds a B.F.A. in Painting from Cleveland Institute of Art, (1999) and an M.F.A. in Painting and Drawing from the California College of the Arts (2001).

== Work and Themes ==
Through painting, drawing and sculptural installation, Black's work explores the course of her personal history and broader cultural contexts, examining the intersection of feminism, LGBTQ+ identity, politics, consumerism, notions of value, and desire.

Black's sculptural representations are life sized re-creations of objects which she makes from paper, hot glue, and acrylic paint. In some exhibitions she arranges her sculptures of domestic objects, books, magazines, handbags, and shoes into still life arrangements, creating installations blending the real and the imaginary. Her two-dimensional paintings and drawings are based on imagery gathered from various sources such as fashion magazines, newspapers, and books.

== Exhibitions ==
=== Solo ===
- 2005 “Caught Up In The Moment,” Heather Marx Gallery, San Francisco, CA.
- 2008 “In Between Things,” University of Georgia, Broad Street Gallery, Athens, GA.
- 2009 “Timeless,” Charlie James Gallery, Los Angeles, CA.
- 2010 “Be Here Now,” Marx & Zavattero, San Francisco, CA.
- 2010 “If Nothing Else Matters,” PEEL, Houston, TX.
- 2010 “Work Out,” San Jose Institute of Contemporary Art, San Jose, CA.

=== Group ===
- 2004: “2004 California Biennial,” Orange County Museum of Art, Newport Beach, CA.
- 2005: “The Superfly Effect,” Jersey City Museum, Jersey City, NJ.
- 2007: “Artist of Invention: A Century of CCA,” Oakland Museum of California, Oakland, CA.
- 2015: “Misappropriations: New Acquisitions,” Orange County Museum of Art, Newport Beach, CA.
- 2017: “Sanctuary City: With Liberty and Justice for Some,” San Francisco Arts Commission, San Francisco, CA.
- 2017: “With Liberty and Justice for Some,” Berkeley Art Center, Berkeley, CA.
- 2017: “Detritus,” San Jose Institute of Contemporary Art, San Jose, CA.
- 2017: “Pulped Fictions,” The Torrance Museum, Torrance, CA.
- 2018: “California Love,” Galerie Droste, Wuppertal, Germany.
- 2018: “Vanity of Earthly Achievements,” Orth Contemporary, Tulsa, OK.
- 2018: “Superset,” Fused, San Francisco CA.
- 2018: “Art Is Where The Heart Is,” Galerie LJ, Paris, France.
- 2024: "Turning the Page," Pier 24 Photography, San Francisco, CA.

== Publications ==
=== Publications with contributions by Black ===
- 2004 California Biennial. New Port Beach: Orange County Museum of Art, 2005. ISBN 978-0917493355
- Bay Area Now 4. San Francisco: Yerba Buena Center for the Arts, 2006, pages 16–17.
- Deluxe: How Luxury Lost Its Luster, by Dana Thomas. London: penguin press, 2007, page 170. ISBN 978-1594201295
- Artist of Invention: A Century of CCA, San Francisco: California College of the Arts, 2007. ISBN 978-9780975357
- New Image Sculpture, by Eleanor Heartney, and Rene Paul Barilleaux. San Antonio: McNay Art Museum, 2011, pages 32–39. ISBN 978-0916677558
- Beautiful Decay, Book 9: The Seven Deadly Sins, by Amir H Fallah. Los Angeles: Beautiful/Decay, 2012. ISBN 978-0982474587
- One Painting a Day, by Timothy Callaghan. Beverly: Quarry Books, 2013. ISBN 978-1592538300
- Boxed: A Visual History and the Art of Boxing, by Franklin Sirmans. New York: Damiani/Paul Kasmin Gallery, 2014, pages 64–65. ISBN 978-8862083546
- Quiet Please: The Mental Game of Art and Tennis, by Ann Trinca. Berkeley: Berkeley Art Center, 2016, pages 1–20.
- Much Love and Respect. San Francisco: Gallery 16, 2019.
- Find Your Artistic Voice, by Lisa Congdon. San Francisco: Chronicle Books, 2019, pages 86–91 ISBN 978-1452168869

== Collections ==
Black's work is held in the following public and private collections:

- Cantor Arts Center, Stanford, CA.
- Museum of Fine Arts Houston, Houston, TX.
- Oakland Museum of California, Oakland, CA.
- Orange County Museum of Art, Newport Beach, CA.
- Pier 24 Photography, San Francisco, CA.
- San Francisco Museum of Modern Art, San Francisco, CA.
- The West Collection, Philadelphia, PA.

== Awards ==
- 2020 Marcus Early Career Research Award
