= Anthony Wayne (disambiguation) =

Anthony Wayne was an American army general during the American Revolutionary War.

Anthony Wayne may also refer to:

- Anthony Wayne High School, in Whitehouse, Ohio
  - Anthony Wayne Generals, the athletic teams of Anthony Wayne High School
- Anthony Wayne Bridge, in Toledo, Ohio
- Anthony Wayne Local School District, a school district in Northwest Ohio
- Anthony Wayne Elementary School, Erie, Pennsylvania
- PS Anthony Wayne, a Great Lakes sidewheel steamboat that exploded on Lake Erie

== See also ==
- Earl Anthony Wayne, US international policy maker and diplomat
- Anthony Wayne England, former NASA astronaut
