= Glover's Cave =

Cave in Todd County, Kentucky

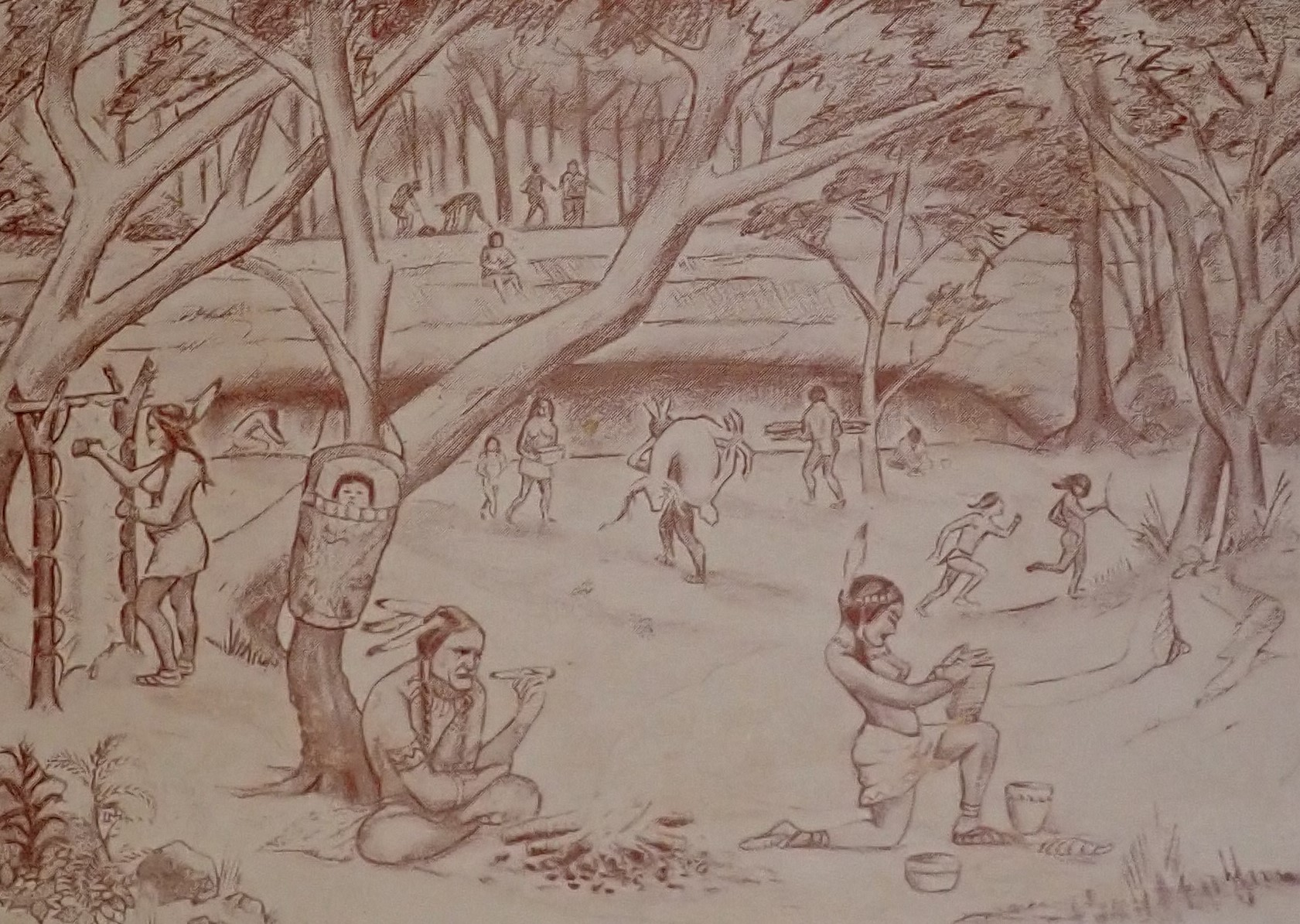
Interpretive sketch of Woodland Culture at Glover's Cave

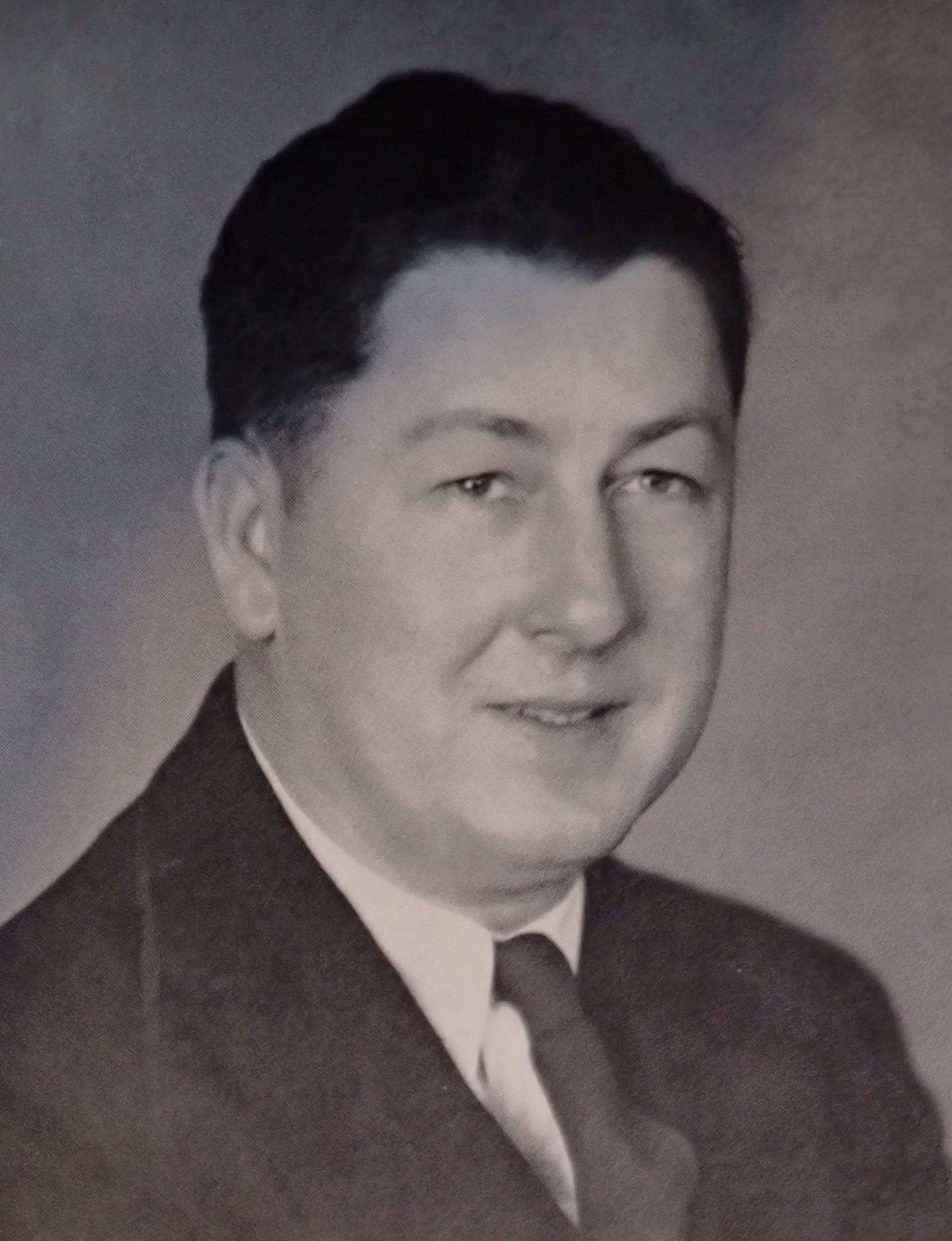
Col. Raymond C. Vietzen

Glover's Cave is part of an extensive natural karst system that extends from Christian to Todd counties in Kentucky. Over 3.2 km of the cave have been surveyed. The cave was used for many purposes since its discovery by Native American Indians. They inhabited a major entrance to the cave from about 10,000 years ago until 1,000 years ago. Col. Raymond C. Vietzen, an amateur archaeologist from Ohio, performed large excavations with permission from the Glover family from 1941 through 1980s. He published The Saga of Glover's Cave in 1957 for which it is best known. The archaeological site has the Smithsonian trinomial designation of 15CH315. Some of the artifacts may be on display at the New Indian Ridge Museum. Previously known as "Bell's Cave", it was used during the American Civil War as a camp. Also, legend has it that Jesse James used the cave as a hide-out on his way to rob the Russellville, Kentucky bank. The property is privately owned and protected.

== Sources ==
- Todd County Pictorial History Book, Volume I
