= Evangelical and Reformed Church (Vermilion, Ohio) =

Historic church in Ohio, United States

- U.S. National Register of Historic Places
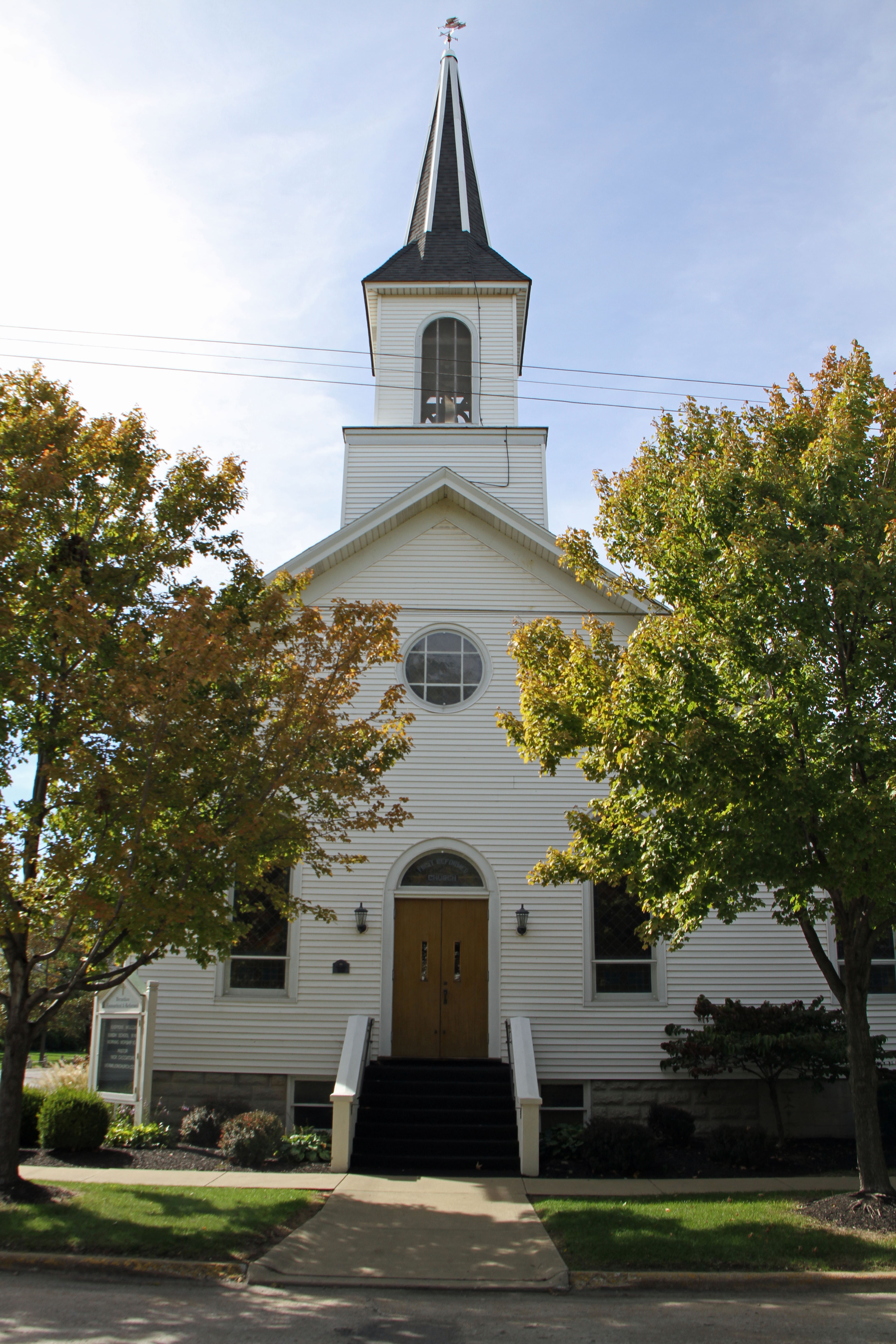

- Location within Ohio Location within the United States
- Location: Jct. of Grand and Ohio Sts., Vermilion, Ohio
- Coordinates: 41°25′12″N 82°22′0″W
- Area: less than one acre
- Built: 1868
- Architectural style: Italianate
- MPS: Vermilion-Harbour Town MRA
- NRHP reference No.: 79003960
- Added to NRHP: November 14, 1979

Evangelical and Reformed Church is a historic church at the junction of Grand and Ohio Streets in Vermilion, Ohio.

The church building was constructed in 1868 and added to the National Register of Historic Places in 1979. The church is now affiliated with the Conservative Congregational Christian Conference.
