= Linwood Park =

Private resort park in Vermilion, Ohio

Coordinates: 41°25′31″N 82°21′20″W

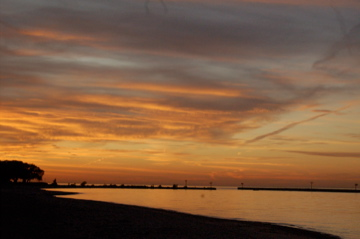
Along the beach at Linwood Park

Linwood Park is a private, family park in the city of Vermilion in the north central part of the U.S. state of Ohio on the shores of Lake Erie. It is located in the northeastern corner of Erie County.

It was founded by members of the Evangelical Association as a place to hold Sunday School assemblies, church conferences, and other religious services, in a Chautauqua-like setting. It continued to be used by the United Methodist Church through the 1990s as a summer camp .

Today, Linwood is a park of privately owned cottages, with a beach and many other amenities. Christian worship and other ministries continue to be held there weekly during the summer.
