= Anthony Wayne (steamboat) =

Early wooden-hulled sidewheel steamship

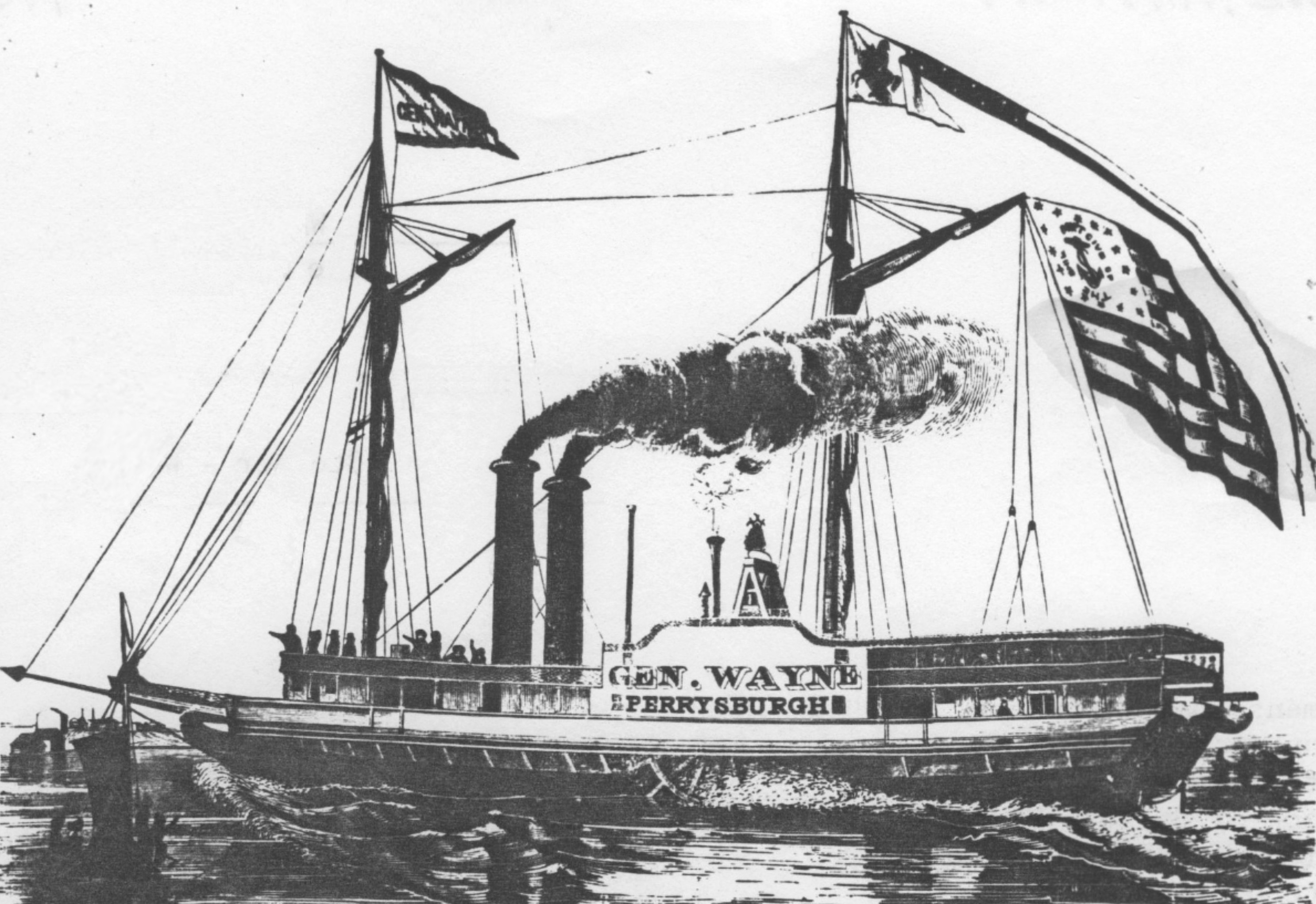
- The Anthony Wayne underway

History

United States
- Name: Anthony Wayne
- Operator: Perrysburgh & Miami Steam Boat Company 1837-1839; Charles B. Howard & Company 1839–1850
- Builder: Samuel L. Hubbell, Perrysburg, Ohio
- In service: August 8, 1837
- Out of service: April 27, 1850
- Fate: Sank after a boiler explosion.

General characteristics
- Class & type: Sidewheel steamer - passengers and package freight
- Tonnage: 390.50 gross tonnage
- Length: 156.50 ft (47.70 m)
- Beam: 25.75 ft (7.85 m)
- Height: 10.25 ft (3.12 m)

National Register of Historic Places data
Anthony Wayne Shipwreck
U.S. National Register of Historic Places
Location within Ohio Location within the United States
Location	Lake Erie, near Vermilion, Ohio
Nearest city	Vermilion, Ohio
Coordinates	41°31.00′N 82°23.00′W
Built	1837
Architect	Samuel L. Hubbell
Architectural style	Steamboat
NRHP reference No.	15000479
Added to NRHP	January 2, 2018

Anthony Wayne (also known as Anthony B. Wayne or General Wayne) was an early wooden-hulled sidewheel steamship (Note: The Anthony Wayne was an early Great Lakes steamboat. The Wayne was built only 19 years after the first steamboat, the Walk-In-The-Water saw service on the waters of the lakes.) that sank on April 28, 1850, in Lake Erie off the coast of Vermilion, Ohio, after two of her starboard side boilers exploded. The number of people on board the ship at the time of incident is estimated to be about 100. The ship's clerk reported that there were 80 to 100 people on board, which included the crew, with about 30 of them surviving.

The wreck of the Wayne was discovered in September 2006, lying in 50 feet (15 m) of water about 8 miles (13 km) north of Vermilion, Ohio. Although she was discovered in 2006, a public announcement was not made until June 21, 2007. On January 2, 2018, the wreck of the Wayne was listed on the National Register of Historic Places.

== History ==
The Anthony Wayne was built in 1837, in Perrysburg, Ohio, by Samuel L. Hubbell. She was 156.50 feet (47.70 m) in length, her beam was 25.75 feet (7.85 m) wide and her hull was 10.25 feet (3.12 m) deep. She had a gross tonnage of 390.50 tons. She was powered by a 120-horsepower high pressure steam engine with a 27-by-3-inch (68.6 cm × 7.6 cm) piston, power for the engine was provided by 4 Scotch marine boilers, and she was propelled two 25-foot (7.6 m) paddle wheels. The engine was built by Hathaway & Company in 1936. She was named after United States Army officer Anthony Wayne.

On May 24, 1843, she caught fire at a wharf in Sandusky, Ohio. On May 23, 1848, she lost her upper deck because of hurricane-force winds at Detroit, Michigan. In 1849, the Wayne was extensively rebuilt in Trenton, Michigan, by D.W. Donahue. She was given a new engine from the steamer Columbus, which had wrecked on a sand bar at Dunkirk, New York, and her old engine was fitted to the steamer Baltimore. Her new engine was a 150-horsepower horizontal crosshead engine built by Olds & Company of Sandusky, Ohio, and was rebuilt by James Menzes. She also received new boilers. On January 12, 1850, the Wayne was crushed by ice and sank at the John Chester & Company dock in the Detroit River.

== Final voyage ==
On April 27, 1850, the Wayne left Toledo, Ohio, carrying about 25 passengers; she later steamed into Sandusky, Ohio. She left Sandusky, bound for Buffalo, New York, at midnight with 300 barrels of high-quality wine, whiskey, some cattles and horses, and about 40 additional passengers on board. At the time of the disaster, Captain E. C. Gore was blown out of his bed and was unhurt; he survived in a lifeboat with the ship's clerk, a fireman and two passengers. The lifeboat eventually drifted ashore at Vermilion, Ohio.
