= Thomas Alva Edison Birthplace =

Historic house in Ohio, United States

- Thomas A. Edison Birthplace
- U.S. National Register of Historic Places
- U.S. National Historic Landmark
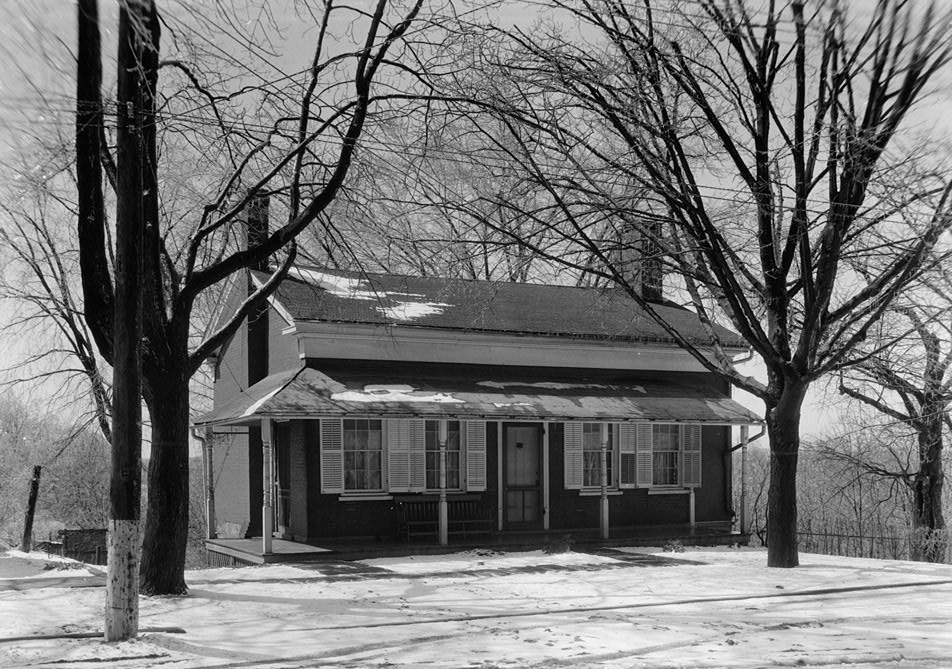
- HABS photo, 1934

- Location within Ohio Location within the United States
- Interactive map showing the location of Thomas Alva Edison Birthplace
- Location: 9 Edison Drive; Milan, Ohio
- Coordinates: 41°18′0″N 82°36′16″W
- Area: less than one acre
- Built: 1841
- Built by: Samuel Edison
- NRHP reference No.: 66000608
- Added to NRHP: October 15, 1966

The Thomas Alva Edison Birthplace is a historic house museum at 9 Edison Drive in Milan, Ohio, Built in 1841, it was the birthplace of American inventor Thomas Alva Edison (1847–1931), born on February 11, 1847. It was designated a National Historic Landmark in 1965, and was added to the National Register of Historic Places in 1966. It is now the Thomas Edison Birthplace Museum.

== Description and history ==
The Thomas Alva Edison Birthplace is in a formerly residential (now a museum complex) area north of downtown Milan, on the west side of North Edison Drive. It is a small 1 1/2-story brick building, with a gabled roof and two end chimneys. The main facade is five bays wide, with the entrance at the center, topped by a four-light transom window. The door and window openings are all headed by stone lintels. The downstairs interior includes two parlors, a sitting room, and kitchen. The sitting room, in which Edison was born, includes the bed in which his mother lay for the birth. The upstairs attic level includes two more bedrooms. The house is furnished with Edison family artifacts.

The house was built and designed by Samuel Edison in 1841, on land purchased by his wife, Nancy Elliott Edison. His son Thomas was born here in 1847, and it remained the family home until 1854, when they moved to Port Huron, Michigan. The young Edison's early youth in Milan appears to have been unremarkable, the most notorious incident being his burning down a barn, described by one biographer as a "glorious experiment". The house was sold in 1854, but was repurchased by Edison's sister in 1894. After Edison's death in 1931, his wife and daughter worked to transform the birthplace into a museum in his honor.

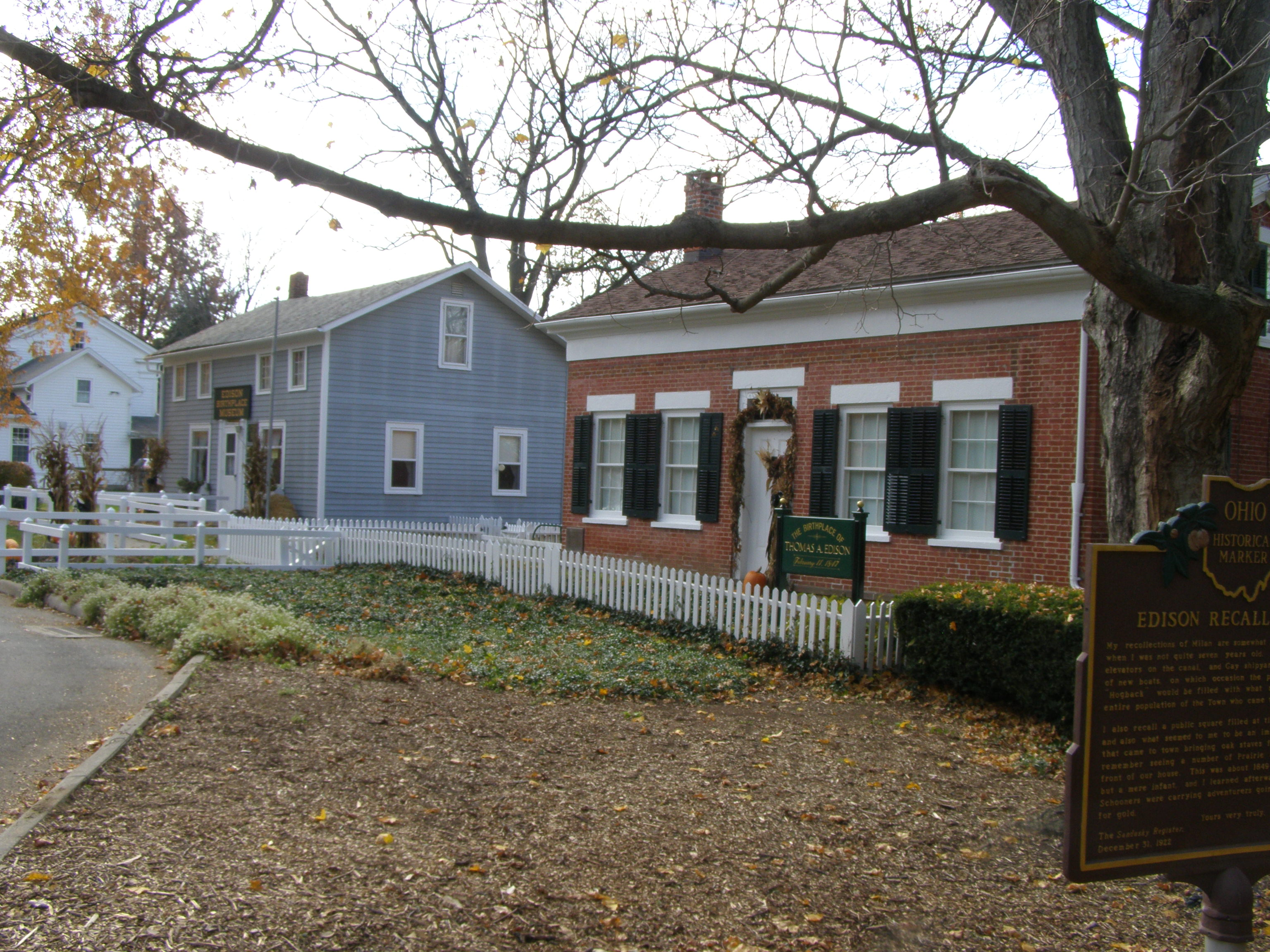
Fall of 2008

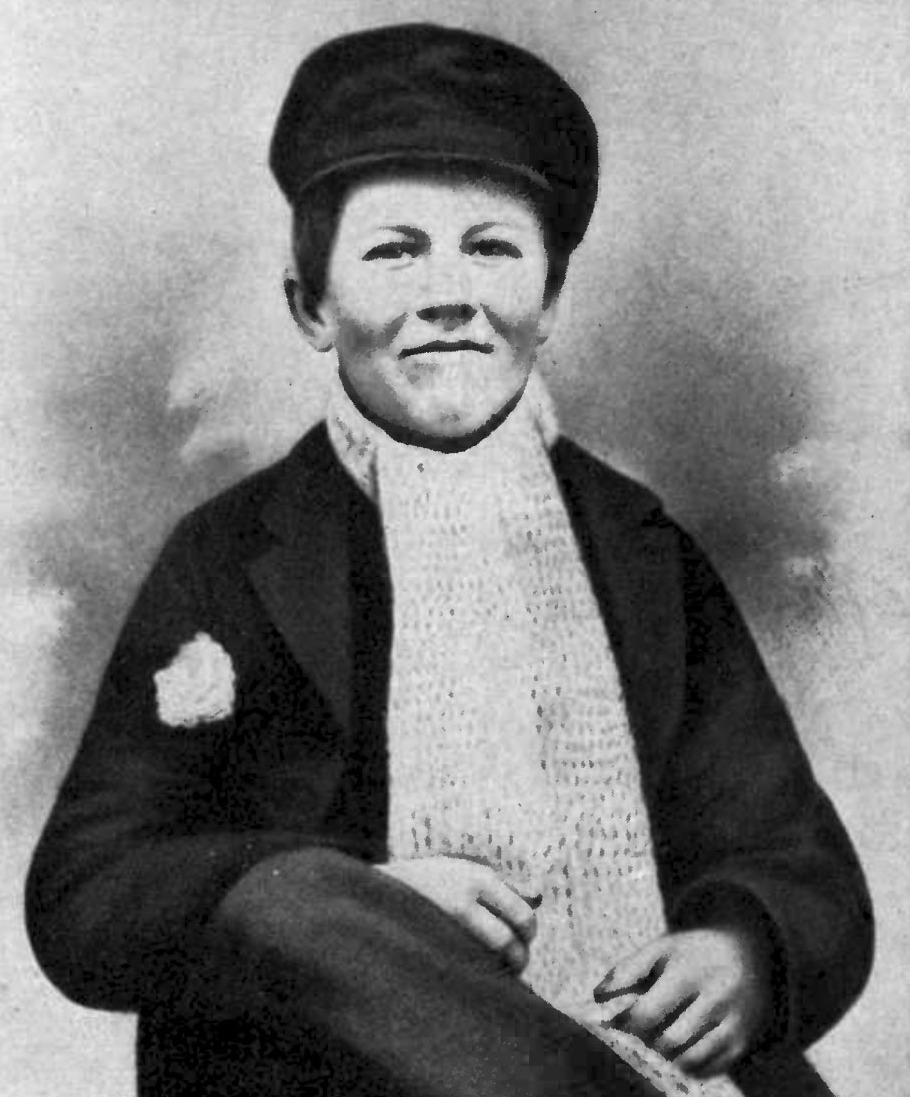
Thomas Edison as a boy

== See also ==
- National Register of Historic Places listings in Erie County, Ohio
- List of National Historic Landmarks in Ohio
