= Franks Site =

- Morris-Franks Site
- U.S. National Register of Historic Places
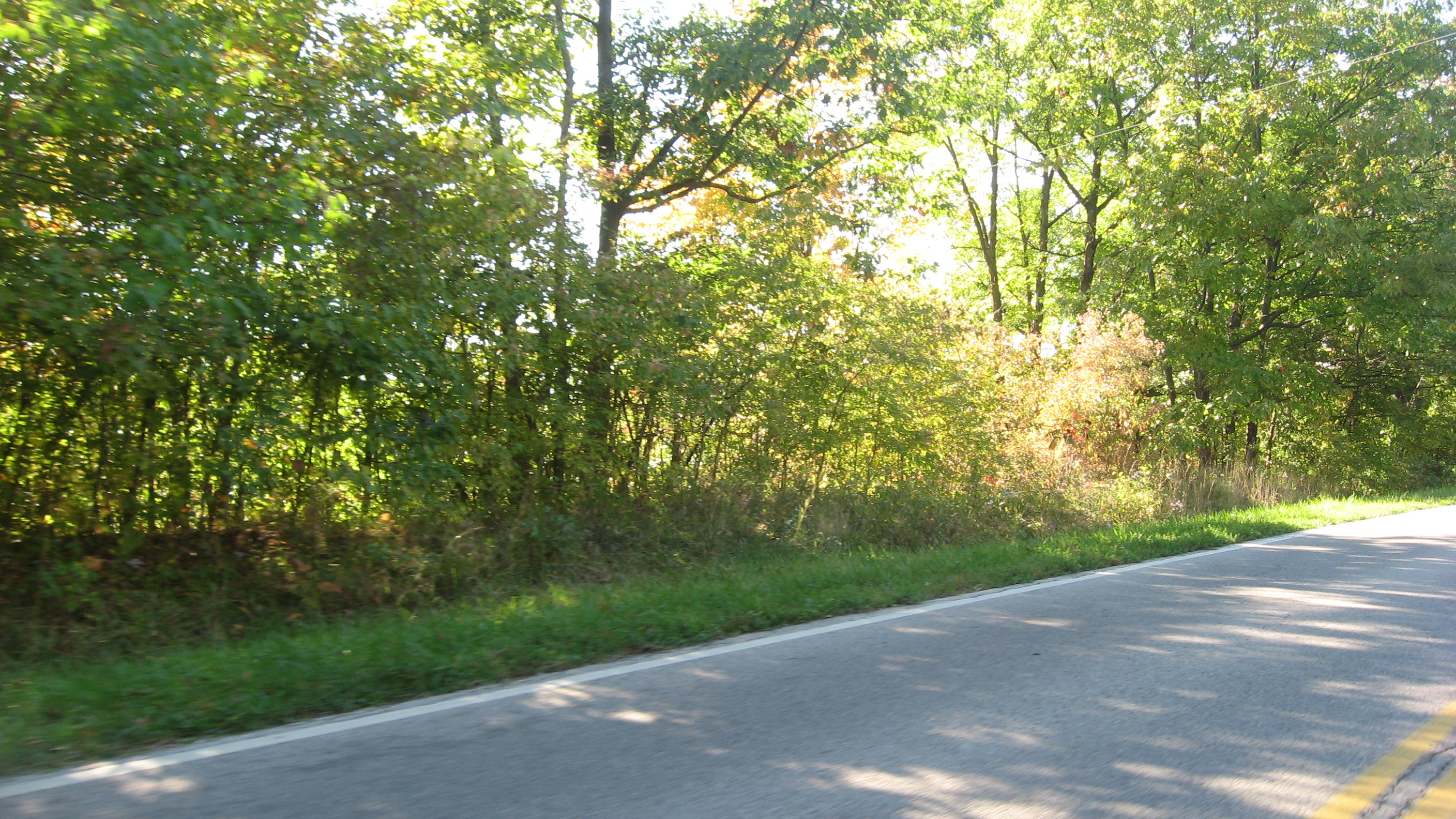
- Woods in the portion of the site traversed by the road

- Location within Ohio
- Location: Between Vermilion Rd. and the Vermilion River, southeast of central Vermilion, Ohio
- Coordinates: 41°24′33″N 82°20′4″W
- Area: 87 acres (35 ha)
- NRHP reference No.: 75001465
- Added to NRHP: September 5, 1975

The Franks Site is a large archaeological site in the northeastern part of the U.S. state of Ohio. Located atop bluffs overlooking the Vermilion River in northwestern Lorain County, it lies in the city of Vermilion close to the river's mouth in Lake Erie. The site was once inhabited by people of the Erie tribe before their destruction, and archaeological investigations have yielded enough information to make it exceptionally valuable for learning about its erstwhile inhabitants.

== Location ==
The Franks Site lies midway between Mill Hollow, where the river makes a very sharp bend, and central Vermilion; it sits by the edge of a bluff overlooking a smaller yet still significant river bend. A road traverses the site, dividing it into two distinct sections, while a third section is demarcated by its distance from the other two. Much of the area consists simply of campsites, but the community cemetery is massive, occupying the entire third section and nearly half of the other two. The southern portion of the site is marked by curving earthworks atop the bluff's edge. Had the site been excavated sooner after the coming of civilization, it might have produced yet richer findings; many burials were destroyed on the Franks farm in digging cellars for farm buildings, as well as by crews constructing the present road through the farm.

== Excavations ==
Raymond C. Vietzen led an excavation of the Franks Site in 1941, finding skeletons and artifacts such as pottery. The burials were of divers forms: Vietzen reported the presence both of extended and flexed burials, for some bodies had been placed lengthwise, while others' legs had been drawn up to the chest in a crouching position. The possibility of the two representing two different phases was considered, but this was easily disproven as many parts of the cemetery included skeletons of both sorts that had plainly been buried at the same time. Many adult female skeletons were buried together with exceptionally tiny infant skeletons, suggesting that many women died in childbirth and that it was customary to bury mother and child together.

Pottery from the site bears many similarities to pottery from other Erie sites. Common features on Franks pottery include lines incised and impressed with antlers, narrow lines incised with smaller tools, and rounded and thumbnail-shaped depressions. The pottery rims were particularly important for decorations; many of the rims were expanded in order to give them collared appearances, as well as serving to reinforce their strength and to facilitate handling. Many of the decorated rims were crimped with impressions of bits of wood or bone, while others bore notches or scalloped impressions. Animal bones were common throughout, with numerous fish skeletons from species such as the sheepshead and the garfish, and excavations also revealed numerous features such as postmolds and rubbish pits. The sheer size of the site and apparent number of inhabitants prompted Vietzen to declare that it "may truly be called an Erie City as it is far too vast to be simply classed as a village". He dated some of the artifacts at the site to circa AD 1650, just a few years before the date in which The Jesuit Relations notes the destruction of the Eries by Iroquois warriors.

== Moes Site ==
Just south of the Franks Site is a smaller site, the Moes Site, which appears to be closely related to the Franks Site. Like Franks, Moes included a cemetery, although its smaller size meant that only ten burials (most of them infants) were found during Vietzen's excavation; hundreds of potsherds, identical to those of Franks, proved much more valuable. Located at the very edge of a river bluff, the site was named for landowner Isaac Moes; Vietzen reported that the site also included a burial mound from which Moes and his family had excavated many skeletons and artifacts, including a fine birdstone.

== Preservation ==
After excavating the Franks Site, Vietzen published multiple books in which the Franks Site was extensively covered, and he established a museum in Amherst in which some of the site's artifacts were displayed. The site itself has experienced the influence of historic preservation: it was listed on the National Register of Historic Places in late 1975 under the name of "Morris-Franks Site", qualifying because of its archaeological significance. It was the first of four Lorain County archaeological sites to be added to the Register, along with the Burrell Fort, the Burrell Orchard Site, and the Eiden Prehistoric District.
