= Timothy Callaghan =

American contemporary artist

- Born: 1976 (age 49–50); Toledo, Ohio, US
- Education: Cleveland Institute of Art (BFA); Kent State University (MFA)
- Occupations: Artist, educator, author
- Website: timothycallaghan.com

Timothy Callaghan (born 1976) is an American contemporary painter, educator, and author, born in Toledo, Ohio, and based in Cleveland. He is known for his observational paintings of urban environments in the Northeast Ohio region, being the author of One Painting a Day, and as a longtime educator.

== Early life ==
Timothy Callaghan was born in Toledo, Ohio, and grew up in Temperance, Michigan. Callaghan says that his mother instilled a strong work ethic in him, giving him the discipline to later write his book, One Painting a Day. In interviews, he has credited the portrait of Frank O'Hara by Fairfield Porter as a major influence to start his artistic career, noting that the specificity of the portrait made it stand out to him. He moved to Cleveland in 1994. After graduate school, Callaghan worked in the service industry for a year, so he could paint all day and work nights. At the time, he wanted to create a new body of work to show to potential galleries.

== Education ==
Timothy Callaghan earned a BFA in painting from the Cleveland Institute of Art in 1999 and an MFA from Kent State University in 2005.

== Career ==
Callaghan has exhibited his work at Frederieke Taylor Gallery in New York City, William Busta Gallery, Zygote Press, and 1300 Gallery in Cleveland, as well as Kent State University. His work is also included in the Cleveland Clinic and the Cleveland Artists Association's collections.

In 2013, Callaghan published his book One Painting A Day through Quarry Books. He received an Ohio Arts Council Individual Excellence Award in 2015, and was selected for the 2017 Biennial Juried Exhibition, a showcase of 58 artists chosen from more than 300 applicants.

In 2018, he participated in a residency sponsored by the FRONT International Triennial in Cleveland's Glenville neighborhood. He set up a temporary studio, and worked with students in the arts, while also creating a new body of work.

=== One Painting a Day ===
One Painting a Day by Timothy Callaghan and published by Quarry Books in 2013 is a six-week observational painting course in which the reader is encouraged to paint a picture every day and follow the suggested 42 exercises listed in the book. The guide's subjects are split into three themes: still life, landscape, and portraiture. The book uses mostly gouache and acrylic paintings for the examples. Steven Litt described the book as "absolutely delightful," while Teoh Yi Chie gave the book a four out of five stars, stating that the portraiture section is too long.

=== Major exhibitions ===
- 2005: 'Good Intentions & Empty Promises' Kent State University Gallery, Kent, OH (M.F.A. Thesis Exhibition)
- 2005: 'Untitled' 1300 Gallery, Cleveland, OH (Two Person)
- 2007: 'First Time, Long Time' William Busta Gallery, Cleveland, OH (Solo)
- 2008: 'Saint Clair En Plein Air' William Busta Gallery, Cleveland, OH (Solo)
- 2010: 'Nightshift' William Busta Gallery, Cleveland, OH (Solo)
- 2011: 'Easel Pictures (Edge of The World)' Arts Collinwood, Cleveland, OH (Solo)
- 2011: 'Happy Hour' Kent State University (Trumbull Campus) Warren, OH (Solo)
- 2012: 'Life Slow Still' William Busta Gallery, Cleveland, OH (Solo)
- 2013: 'One Painting a Day' William Busta Gallery, Cleveland, OH (Solo)
- 2018: 'Timothy Callaghan: A Lovely Tremble' LaSalle Arts and Media Center, Cleveland, OH (Solo)
- 2022: 'Factotum' William Busta Projects, Cleveland, OH (Solo)
- 2025: 'Baroque Down Horizon' William Busta Projects, Cleveland, OH (Solo)

=== Commissions and Works in Collections ===
In 2019, Summa Health commissioned Akron Sky, a permanent gouache on paper painting installed at Dr. Gary B. and Pamela S. Williams Tower in Akron, OH.

In 2021, he was commissioned by the Cleveland Clinic Art Collection to commemorate a deceased dog named Kid. The work was sponsored by the Dunkin' Donuts Joy in Childhood Foundation and the Starlight Children's Foundation. He titled it 'JOY,' and it was installed at the Cleveland Clinic Children's Inpatient Building.

In 2022, he was commissioned again by Summa Health to paint a triptych, consisting of works titled 'St. Thomas School of Nursing,' 'Akron Sky II,' and 'St. Thomas Hospital,' left to right, located at the Juve Family Behavioral Health Pavilion.

He also painted for the Geauga County Public Library at its Bainbridge Branch in 2022, painting four oil paintings depicting the four seasons, each titled 'Four Seasons in Geauga County' with parenthesis at the end representing the season. At the time, he hadn't painted oil in six years, and chose it because "it would resonate the room better," Callaghan quoted.

In 2025, Callaghan was commissioned by the Irish American Archives Society to create artwork for a project to preserve the historical roots of Irishtown Bend, titled 'Irish Town Bend.' Callaghan also takes commissions for private collections.

=== Career as an Educator ===
Aside from being an artist, Callaghan has a teaching career, spanning multiple institutions.

In 2006, he was employed as an adjunct faculty member at Cuyahoga Community College and Cleveland Institute of Art. He taught at Cleveland Institute of Art until 2011, but continued teaching at Cuyahoga Community College until 2014.

In 2008, he became a visiting assistant professor at Oberlin College, and worked there until 2013. Since August 2014, he has served as the Visual Arts Teacher and the Director of the School of Fine Arts at Lake Ridge Academy.

== Artistic approach ==
Callaghan's work is composed of daily observations of the buildings and the modern Midwest landscape around him, specifically Northeast Ohio. He uses mediums such as pencil, ink, watercolor, and gouache on paper, and paints en plein air. Gouache is his medium of choice.

Callaghan typically starts painting his observations on site with a sketchbook in ink, then makes a larger, finished piece in his studio from the sketchbook in gouache. He thinks of photography as a tool, implementing it into his work as a complementary piece. The artist thinks of his workflow in thirds: the first third needing direct observation, and the second third can use a mechanical tool, like photography.

His philosophy is that when we observe a subject for a prolonged period of time, it continuously transforms our perspective about it as we continue to observe. The artist attributed this way of thinking to what first attracted him to painting.

One of the reasons Callaghan transitioned away from his older style, working with oil, is because he thinks the idea of the paper being more fragile and being unable to scrape mistakes out and continue painting, instills a sense of discipline in him.

In 2022, journalist Shawn Mishak writing for Cleveland Scene characterized Callaghan's style as "recognizable with his signature chubby brush strokes building tonal shifts and shadow like a mosaic," while in 2012, Steven Litt said the primary appeal in his style comes from his technique, making every low-velocity brushstroke separate and distinct.
