= Bailey Lakes, Ohio =

- Village
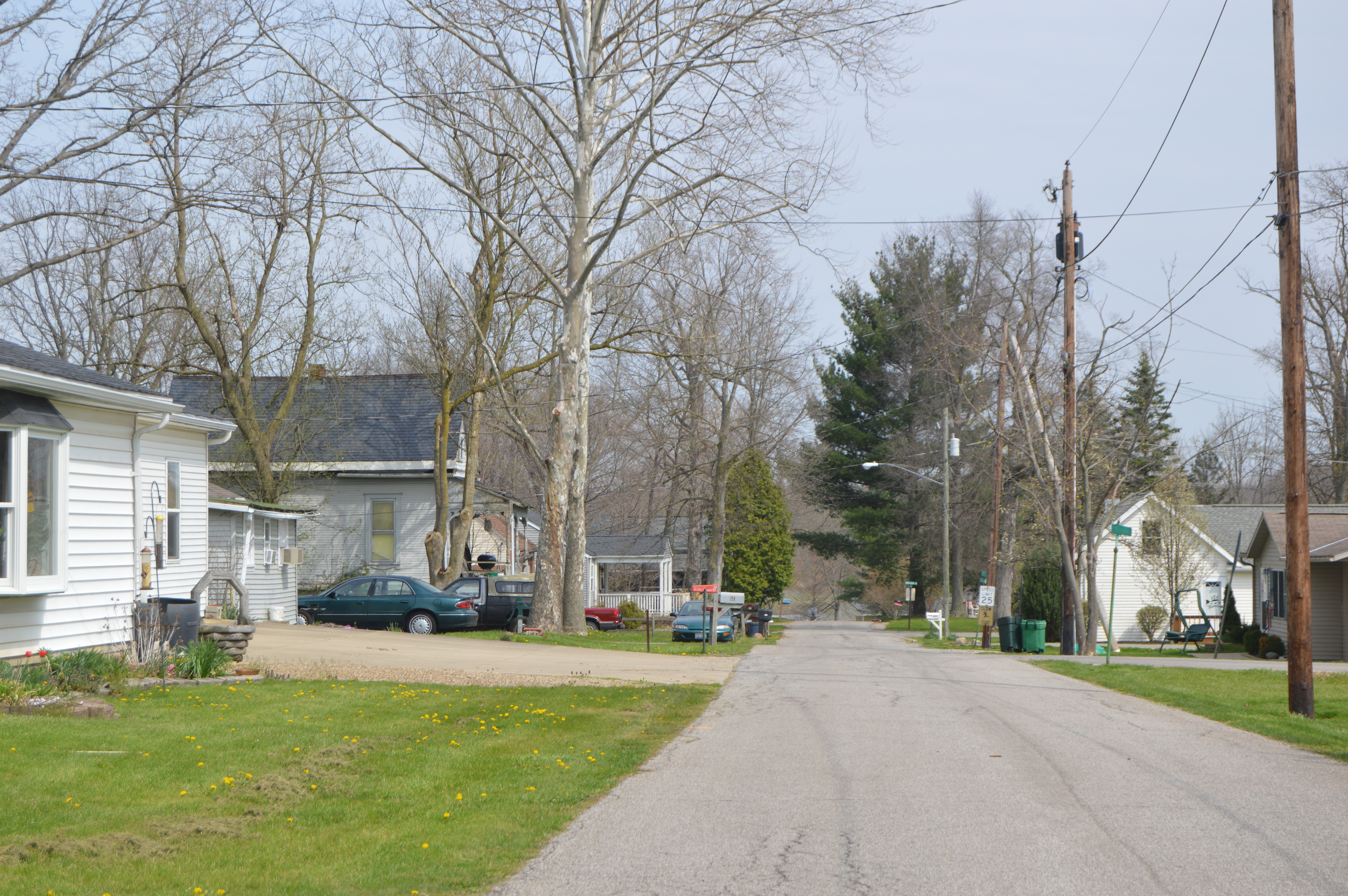
- Lake Drive

- Seal

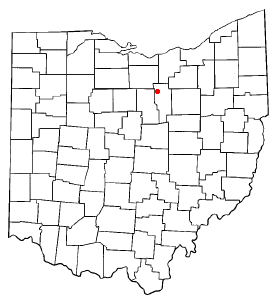
- Location of Bailey Lakes, Ohio

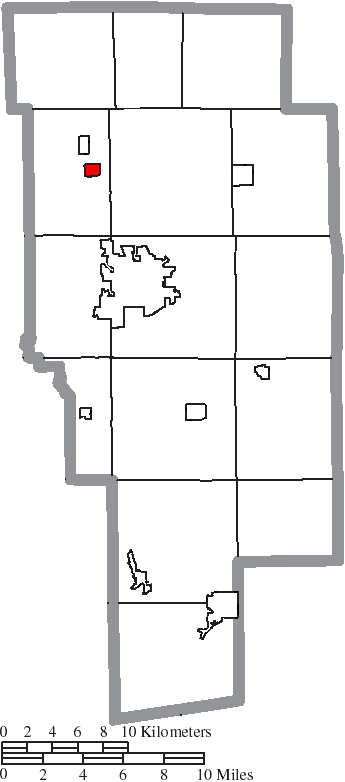
- Location of Bailey Lakes in Ashland County
- Coordinates: 40°56′56″N 82°21′25″W
- Country: United States
- State: Ohio
- County: Ashland
- Township: Clear Creek

Area
  - Total: 0.46 sq mi (1.18 km^{2})
  - Land: 0.38 sq mi (0.99 km^{2})
  - Water: 0.073 sq mi (0.19 km^{2})
- Elevation: 1,014 ft (309 m)

Population (2020)
  - Total: 349
  - Estimate (2023): 346
  - Density: 916.9/sq mi (354.03/km^{2})
- Time zone: UTC-5 (Eastern (EST))
  - Summer (DST): UTC-4 (EDT)
- ZIP code: 44805
- Area code: 419
- FIPS code: 39-03562
- GNIS feature ID: 2398016
- Website: baileylakes.org

Bailey Lakes is a village in Clear Creek Township, Ashland County, Ohio, United States. The population was 349 at the 2020 census.

== History ==
Bailey Lakes was incorporated as a village in 1961.

== Geography ==
The Vermilion River begins its course in Bailey Lakes at the outflow of Mud Lake.

According to the United States Census Bureau, the village has a total area of 0.47 square miles (1.22 km^{2}), of which 0.39 square miles (1.01 km^{2}) is land and 0.08 square miles (0.21 km^{2}) is water.

== Demographics ==
Historical population
Census	Pop.	Note	%±
1970	394		—
1980	397		0.8%
1990	367		−7.6%
2000	397		8.2%
2010	371		−6.5%
2020	349		−5.9%
2023 (est.)	346	▼	−0.9%
U.S. Decennial Census

=== 2010 census ===
As of the census of 2010, there were 371 people, 155 households, and 105 families living in the village. The population density was 951.3 inhabitants per square mile (367.3/km^{2}). There were 168 housing units at an average density of 430.8 per square mile (166.3/km^{2}). The racial makeup of the village was 97.0% White, 1.6% African American, and 1.3% from two or more races. Hispanic or Latino of any race were 0.3% of the population.

There were 155 households, of which 29.7% had children under the age of 18 living with them, 54.8% were married couples living together, 9.7% had a female householder with no husband present, 3.2% had a male householder with no wife present, and 32.3% were non-families. 21.9% of all households were made up of individuals, and 7.1% had someone living alone who was 65 years of age or older. The average household size was 2.39 and the average family size was 2.80.

The median age in the village was 43.5 years. 22.4% of residents were under the age of 18; 5.9% were between the ages of 18 and 24; 23.5% were from 25 to 44; 30.7% were from 45 to 64; and 17.5% were 65 years of age or older. The gender makeup of the village was 48.5% male and 51.5% female.

=== 2000 census ===
As of the census of 2000, there were 397 people, 153 households, and 119 families living in the village. The population density was 978.1 inhabitants per square mile (377.6/km^{2}). There were 157 housing units at an average density of 386.8 per square mile (149.3/km^{2}). The racial makeup of the village was 98.99% White, 0.50% from other races, and 0.50% from two or more races. Hispanic or Latino of any race were 0.25% of the population.

There were 153 households, out of which 38.6% had children under the age of 18 living with them, 63.4% were married couples living together, 10.5% had a female householder with no husband present, and 22.2% were non-families. 20.3% of all households were made up of individuals, and 5.9% had someone living alone who was 65 years of age or older. The average household size was 2.59 and the average family size was 2.93.

In the village, the population was spread out, with 29.0% under the age of 18, 7.8% from 18 to 24, 28.0% from 25 to 44, 25.4% from 45 to 64, and 9.8% who were 65 years of age or older. The median age was 36 years. For every 100 females there were 115.8 males. For every 100 females age 18 and over, there were 102.9 males.

The median income for a household in the village was $39,000, and the median income for a family was $45,781. Males had a median income of $34,250 versus $26,406 for females. The per capita income for the village was $16,271. About 11.8% of families and 11.8% of the population were below the poverty line, including 16.8% of those under age 18 and none of those age 65 or over.
