= Ebenezer Andrews House =

Historic house in Ohio, United States

- U.S. National Register of Historic Places
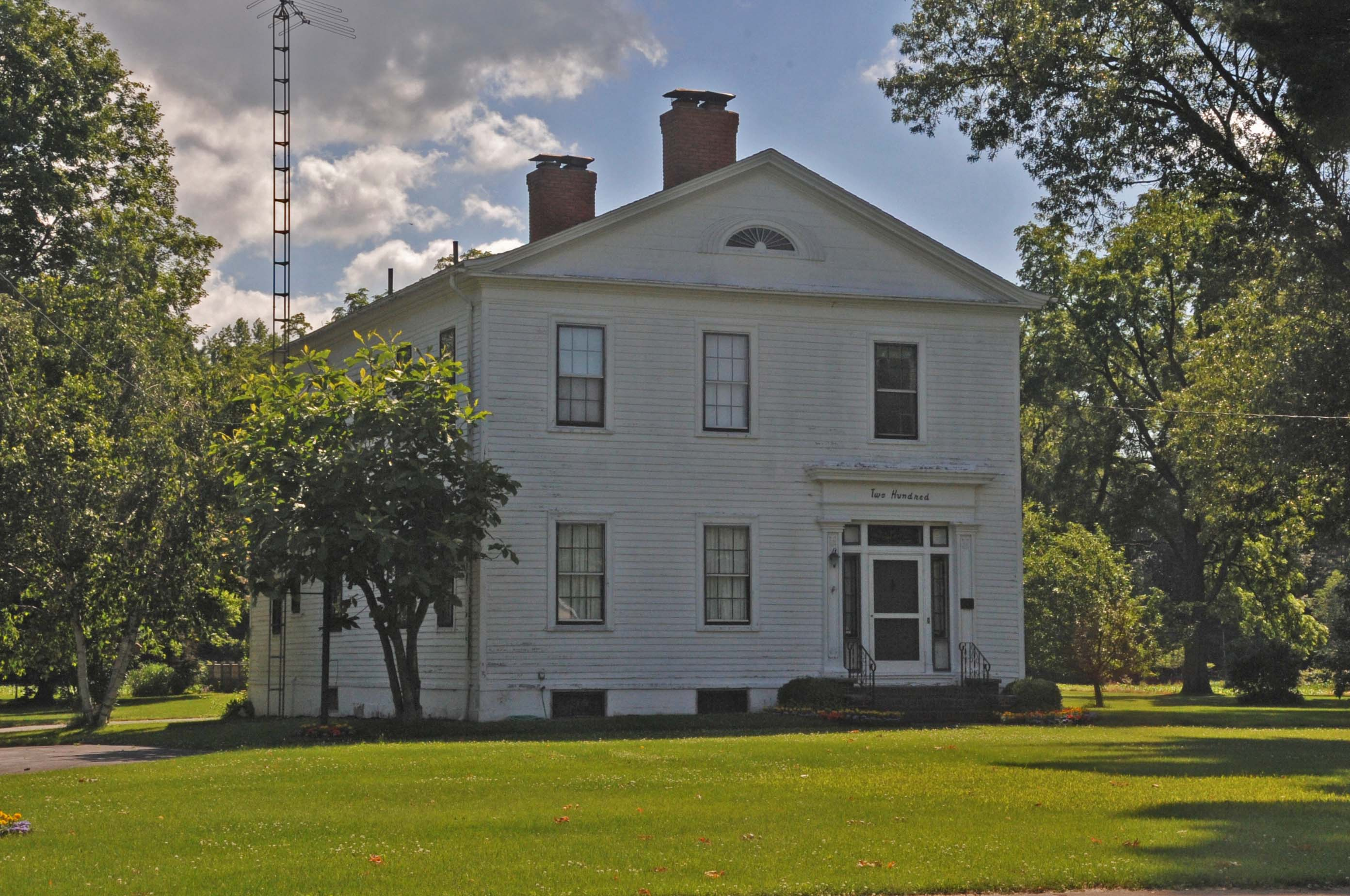
- 1825 EBENEZER ANDREWS HOUSE IN MILAN, OHIO

- Location within Ohio Location within the United States
- Location: 200 S. Main St., Milan, Ohio
- Coordinates: 41°17′38.18″N 82°36′9.62″W
- Built: 1825
- Architectural style: Greek Revival
- NRHP reference No.: 74001467
- Added to NRHP: 25 July 1974

Ebenezer Andrews House is a historic house in Milan, Ohio.

== Description ==
The two and a half story Greek Revival style Andrews House, located at 200 S. Main Street, is a wood frame building on a sandstone foundation. The main mass is rectangular, configured in a side hall pattern, and presents a gable end as main facade fronting Main Street. The front of the house has a pediment with a fan window and horizontal sheathing. The entablature continues the cornice of the roof. The classical entry has multi pane sidelights and a transom within engaged pilasters supporting a substantial architrave. A rear ell extension shows evidence of being built at the same time as the rest of the house. This ell contains a kitchen and porch.

== Ebenezer Andrews ==
Ebenezer Andrews was a lawyer and businessperson. He was active in promoting the Milan Canal. The canal, completed in 1839, led to Milan becoming the largest grain shipping center in 1840. Andrews, an original director of the canal company, owned warehouses in Milan and speculated in grain and goods transported by canal boat. He also owned the first bank in town. Andrews served as the first Probate Judge for Erie County from its founding in 1838 to 1850 when he moved to Chicago.

Andrews built this house in 1825 as his private residence and lived there during his time in Milan. The Ebenezer Andrews House was listed in the National Register of Historic Places on July 25, 1974, at that time both the exterior and the interior were largely unchanged.

== See also ==
- Historic preservation
- National Register of Historic Places in Erie County, Ohio
- Robber baron (industrialist)
