= Festival of the Fish =

Ohioan fish frying event

- Status: active
- Genre: food festivals
- Frequency: Annually
- Location: Vermilion, Ohio
- Country: United States
- Years active: 58–59
- Inaugurated: 1967
- Website: www.vermilionohio.com/festival-of-the-fish/

The Festival of the Fish, held each June, is a three-day fish frying event, held in Vermilion, Ohio, and was founded in 1967. The festival has many attractions, such as the Queen and Princess pageant, local talent concerts, parade, and concessions. The focus, however, is on fried fish which is usually served with French fries and coleslaw or a vegetable. The Festival of the Fish is one of the largest festivals in the area. The City of Vermilion celebrates The Festival of the Fish each Father's Day Weekend. Events include a Princess pageant, a Queen pageant, a pet parade, kids games located in a gazebo, a "Crazy Craft" race, a Father's Day Parade, fireworks, and a sand castle contest.

2020 saw the festival go on hiatus until 2021 caused by the COVID-19 pandemic.
