= Vermilion River (Ohio) =

Coordinates: 41.4270°N 82.3641°W

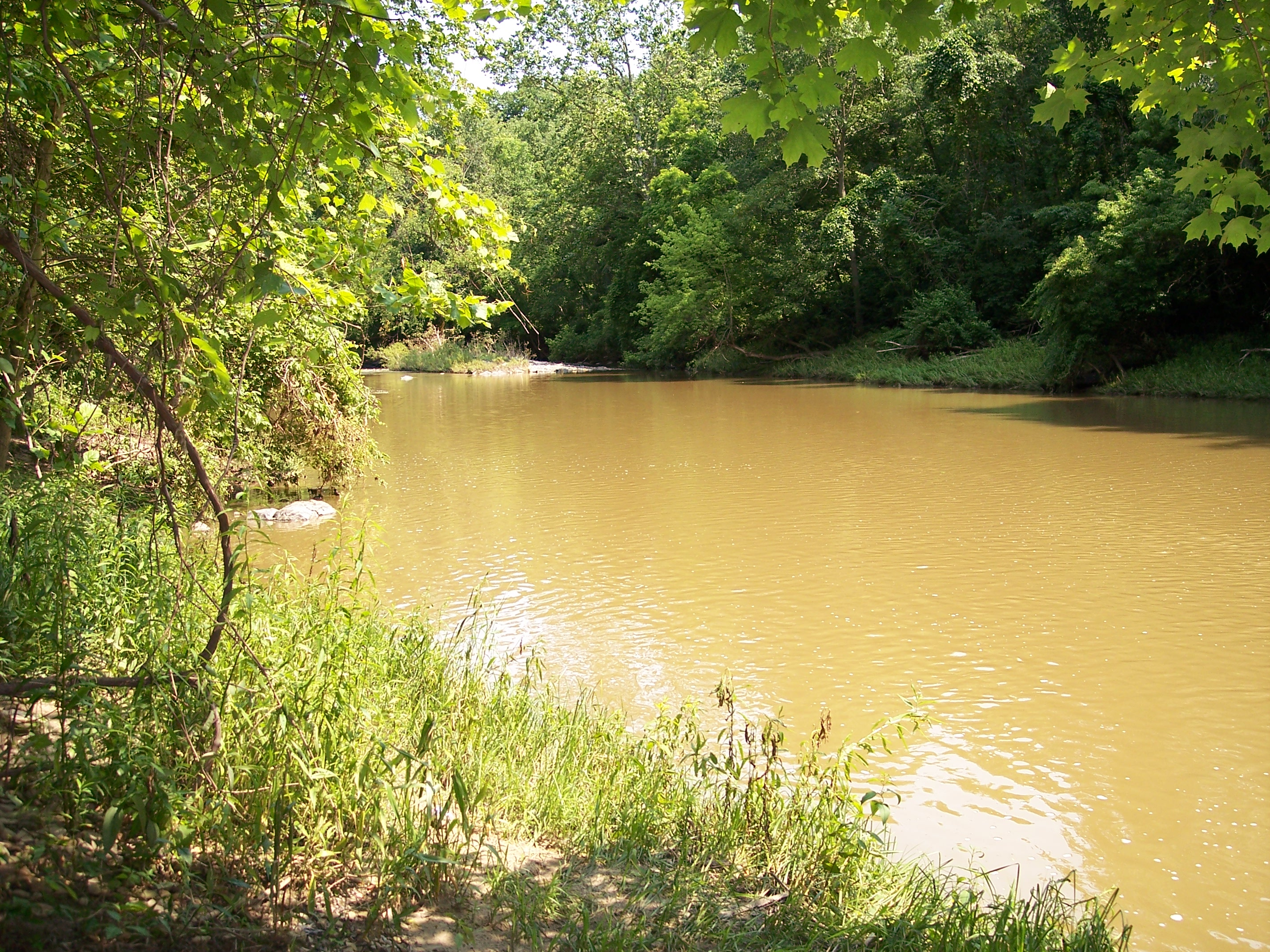
- The Vermilion River at the community of Birmingham in Erie County

Location
- Country: United States

Physical characteristics
- Source
  - location: Bailey Lakes, Ohio
- Mouth
  - location: Lake Erie at Vermilion, Ohio
- Length: 66.9 mi (107.7 km)
- Basin size: 268 mi^{2} (690 km^{2})

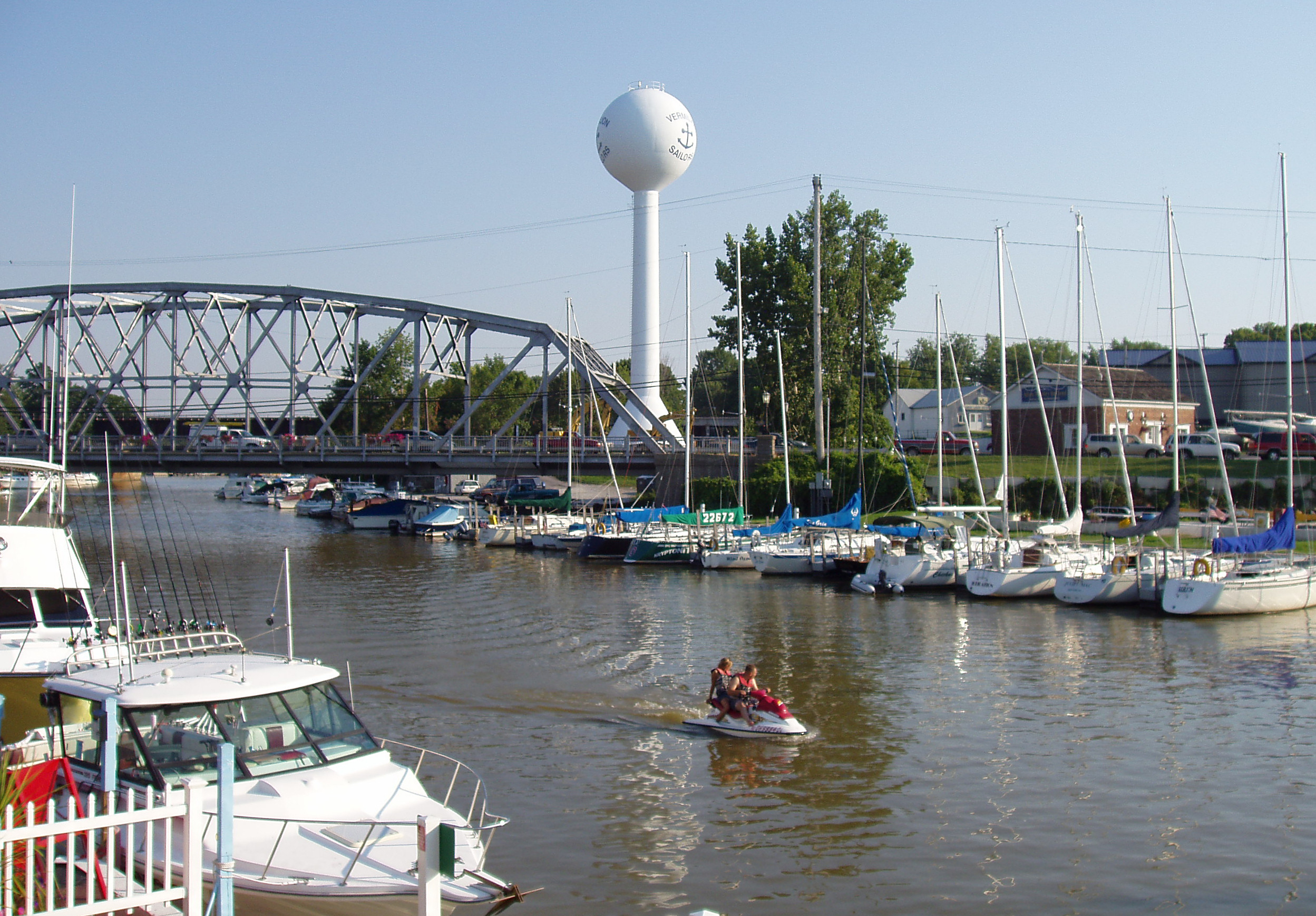
A marina on the Vermilion River at the city of Vermilion

The Vermilion River is a river in northern Ohio in the United States. It is 66.9 miles (107.7 km) long and is a tributary of Lake Erie, draining an area of 268 square miles (690 km^{2}). The name alludes to the reddish clay that is the predominant local soil along its route. The river is commonly muddy after rains.

The river receives returns of stocked steelhead trout from the ODNR each fall through spring. This is the westernmost river, in Ohio, that the ODNR stocks yearly with steelhead trout. During the end of spring the fish return to lake Erie for the summer and will return to the river in the fall. The river is also home to smallmouth bass, largemouth bass, rock bass, channel catfish, bullhead, longnose gar, various suckers, bluegill, sunfish, carp, crappie, freshwater drum, various minnows and darters, crayfish, and a variety of aquatic insects.

== Course ==
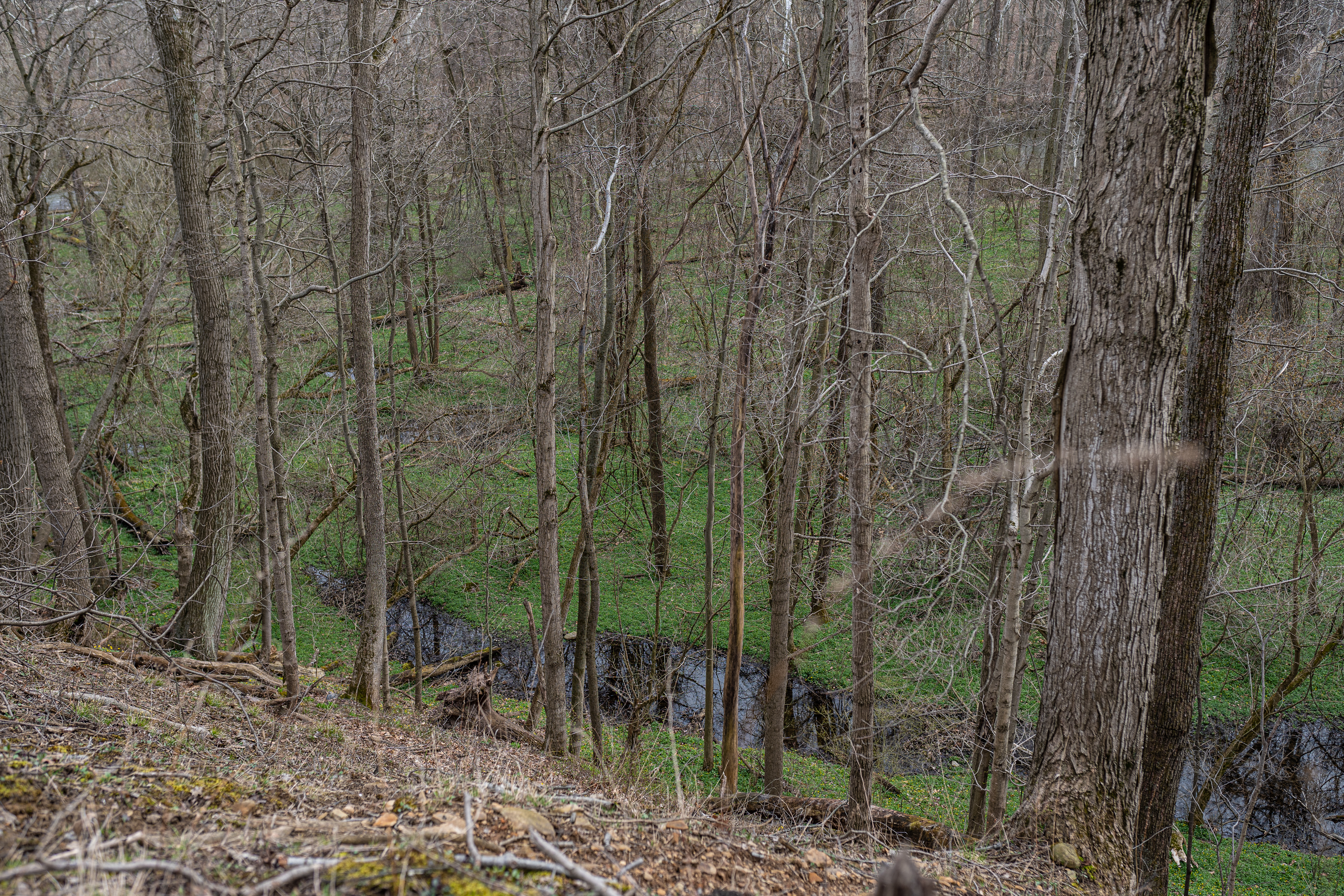
Swamp land on the Vermilion River in Augusta-Anne Olsen State Nature Preserve

The Vermilion River flows from Mud Lake in the town of Bailey Lakes in Ashland County and follows a generally northward course through Huron, Erie and Lorain counties, past the towns of Savannah and Wakeman. It enters Lake Erie in Erie County at the city of Vermilion.

A short distance before the river enters Lake Erie, near State Route 2, it passes through a deep gorge. The Vermilion rest area along the northern (westbound) side of Route 2 features a short nature trail leading to an overview of the gorge. A major archaeological site, known as the Franks Site, sits atop the gorge walls; it was once a large village of the Erie tribe.

Three short tributaries are known as branches or forks of the Vermilion River. The Southwest Branch Vermilion River and the East Branch Vermilion River join the Vermilion in Huron County. The East Fork Vermilion River rises in Lorain County and joins the Vermilion in Erie County.

== Variant names ==
The United States Board on Geographic Names settled on "Vermilion River" as the stream's official name in 1899. According to the Geographic Names Information System, the Vermilion River has also been known as:

- Oulame Thepy
- Vermillion River
- River en Grys

== History ==
Hutchins, Thomas; Cheevers, T., Public domain, via Wikimedia Commons

The Vermilion River has been known by that name since at least 1760, where it appears in explorer George Croghan's journal; it was also recorded by that name in Montressor's 1764 journal of the Bradstreet expedition. Its location is denoted correctly on a 1778 map by Hutchins. In Croghan's 1760 journal, he records this river as "Oulame Thepy", which was his own phonetic interpretation of one of the Native-American tribes' names for it. "Thepy" (or "sepe"/"sipi") was a Native word for 'river' or 'creek', and "Oulame" may translate directly as 'paint'. This river seems to be referred to as "Paint Creek" by later 18th-century European inhabitants; it is said that the local Native Americans collected the purplish-red clay from along this river to use as a sort of paint for their bodies (by mixing it with bright red berry juices).

The name "Vermillion" undoubtedly was an attribution by the first European explorers here, who apparently presumed that the red clay-and-berry mixture was the pigment (and highly valuable European commodity) commonly known as vermillion. Although the substance used as body paint instead turned out to be made from worthless brownish-purple mud, the name "vermillion" stuck anyway. [source, Diary (1787–1791) of David Zeisberger, (publ.1885 by Robert Clarke and Co., Cinti.)] The prior spelling for this river was "Vermillion" (double 'L') until about the end of the 19th century, when the double 'L' was dropped, reportedly due to the spelling conflict with nearby Ashland County's township of 'Vermillion' (which is not upon this river). That said, an urban legend circulating in the city of Vermilion since the early 1970s claims that the town of Vermillion lost its second 'L' because it was more expensive to paint two L's on the water tower.

The Geographic Names Server also lists (erroneously) "River en Grys" as an alternate name for the Vermilion River as well as the Black River. In actuality, the name "Riviere en Grys" was originally intended for what is now called Beaver Creek, which is in between these two rivers. [The "Riviere en Grys" appears on Hutchins 1778 map, east of the "Vermillion River" and west of the "Reneshoua" (the Black River).]

== See also ==
- List of rivers of Ohio
- Vermilion, Ohio
