= Claire Sherman =

American painter

- Born: 1981 (age 43–44); Oberlin, Ohio, US
- Education: The School of the Art Institute of Chicago; University of Pennsylvania
- Known for: Painting, Drawing
- Awards: 2009-10, Sharpe Foundation Fellowship, New York, NY; 2007, MacDowell Colony, Peterborough, NH; 2006, Terra Foundation for American Art, Musée d'Art Américain Giverny, France
- Website: clairesherman.com

Claire Sherman (born 1981, Oberlin, Ohio) is an American painter currently living and working in New York City. Her work is in the collection of the Nerman Museum of Contemporary Art (Overland Park, Kansas), the Margulies Collection (Miami), and other noteworthy public and private collections. She has had solo exhibitions in New York's DC Moore Gallery and DCKT Contemporary, Amsterdam's Galerie Hof & Huyser, London's Houldsworth Gallery, and Chicago's Kavi Gupta Gallery.

Sherman's main body of work consists of landscapes painted with oil on canvas. Their subject matter, more specifically described as ice glaciers, ominous islands, rocky terrain and foliage, is in line with philosophical discourse on the sublime. Sherman is influenced by the writings of Edmund Burke, Immanuel Kant, and Jean-François Lyotard who discussed the sublime and the beauty of the natural world.
