= New Indian Ridge Museum =

Museum and nature reserve in Ohio, United States

Coordinates: 41.419100°N 82.227828°W

The New Indian Ridge Museum, Historic Shupe Homestead, and Wildlife Preserve is a private museum and nature reserve located on Beaver Creek in Amherst, Ohio, consisting of the Shupe Homestead site. The grounds contain two additional lots of upland and lowland mature wooded forest that contain wetlands, vernal pools, and an area floodplain. The property contains numerous tree and wildflower species, several fern types, buttonbushes, pawpaw trees, native green dragon wildflowers, and about fifty different species of birds.

The museum's collection is diverse, with artifacts dating from prehistory to recent decades. Many of the artifacts came from the former Indian Ridge Museum of Elyria Ohio, founded by Col. Raymond C. Vietzen. Matt Nahorn founded the current museum in 2000, but it is not currently open to the public.

== Overview ==
Matt Nahorn worked to reassemble Vietzen's collection which was largely sold at a public auction in the 1990s after Vietzen's death. Nahorn honored Vietzen by using the latter name of his former museum. Vietzen had originally named the facility as the Vietzen Archaeological Museum that was accessible by invitation only, and it was founded in 1930.

In recent years, the NIRM has expanded its focus on ecology and the conservation of wildlife habitats. The NIRM instituted the Beaver Creek Watershed Group (BCWG) to limit changes to the land that could augment flooding and pollution. The BCWG placed an emphasis on maintaining floodplains and riparian zones along Beaver Creek and the creation of private trails to observe the natural beauty and wildlife of the area. NIRM has periodically made the property available to local academic institutions, including Lake Ridge Academy, and provided tours for the students and faculty. The museum's goals include educating students and other interested individuals on the natural, prehistoric, and pioneer history of the area.

== Raymond C. Vietzen ==
Most of NIRM's artifacts are based on the collections of Col. Raymond C. Vietzen, the curator of the former, defunct Indian Ridge Museum near Elyria, Ohio. In 1930 Vietzen founded the Vietzen Archaeological Museum at his family home, at the corner of West Ridge and Fowl Roads in Elyria. For over sixty-five years, Vietzen and his wife, Ruth Bliss delved into the prehistory and history of the local area and other locations in the United States. He was previously a professional automotive mechanic, who later authored seventeen history books and became a prolific artist. He was also an expert on the Erie Indians (a.k.a. Cat Nation) and was adopted by several Native American groups.

His museum was often patronized by local-area schools and organizations. But although Vietzen repeatedly assured the community, (many of whom had donated artifacts to the museum), that his collection would never be sold, his entire estate was auctioned piece-by-piece after his death.

Vietzen was the last living founding member of the Ohio Indian Relic Collectors Society (now the Archaeological Society of Ohio).

== Matt Nahorn ==
Colonel Matthew W. Nahorn, a 2008 graduate of Lake Ridge Academy, is the New Indian Ridge Museum's founder and curator. In 2006, he worked with the Lake Ridge Academy to create the Lake Ridge Archives, in an effort to preserve the school's rich history. He currently serves as an archivist at Lake Ridge Academy.

Nahorn graduated from local Oberlin College in Environmental Studies and continues his research on his hometown and local environmental issues. He has begun to work with the Lake Ridge Academy staff to establish a historical inventory of the school. He maintains the NIRM museum complex. The museum was featured in local newspapers, such as the Lorain Morning Journal and Elyria Chronicle Telegram.

As a result of Nahorn's conservation efforts, members of the Archaeological Society of Ohio petitioned the Kentucky State Government to grant him the honorary title Kentucky Colonel in 2007, the same honorary title that had been bestowed to Vietzen.

== The historic Shupe Home ==
In 1811, Jacob Shupe, settled in what would later become Amherst Township, Lorain County, Ohio. The present owners of the Historic Shupe House, which still exists on its original foundation, have learned through their 23 years of historical research that the house was built circa 1812 and is the oldest house in Amherst and likely the first frame house to have been constructed in Lorain County.

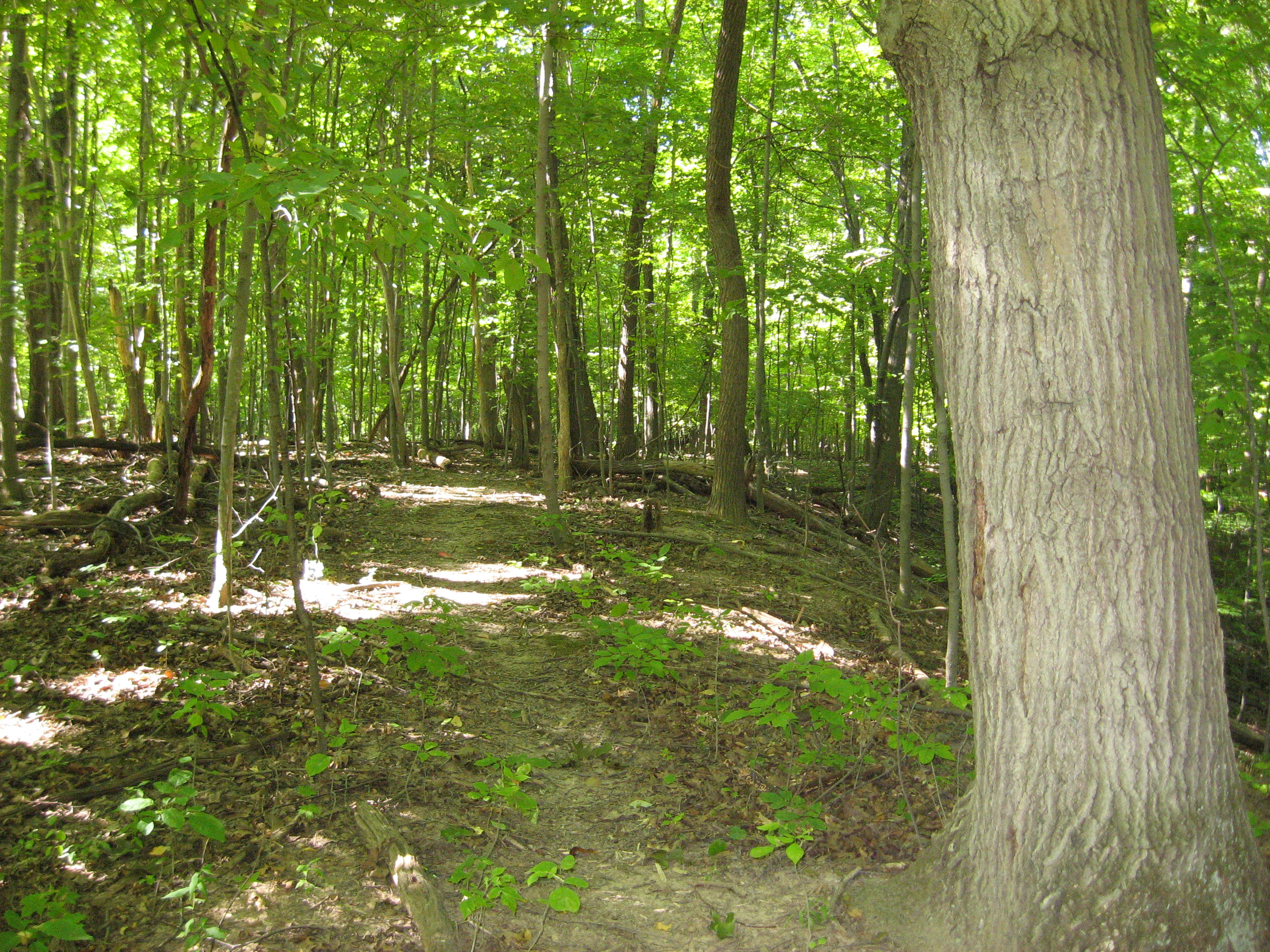
A mature forest with a tree over 250 years old is a part of the wildlife preserve.

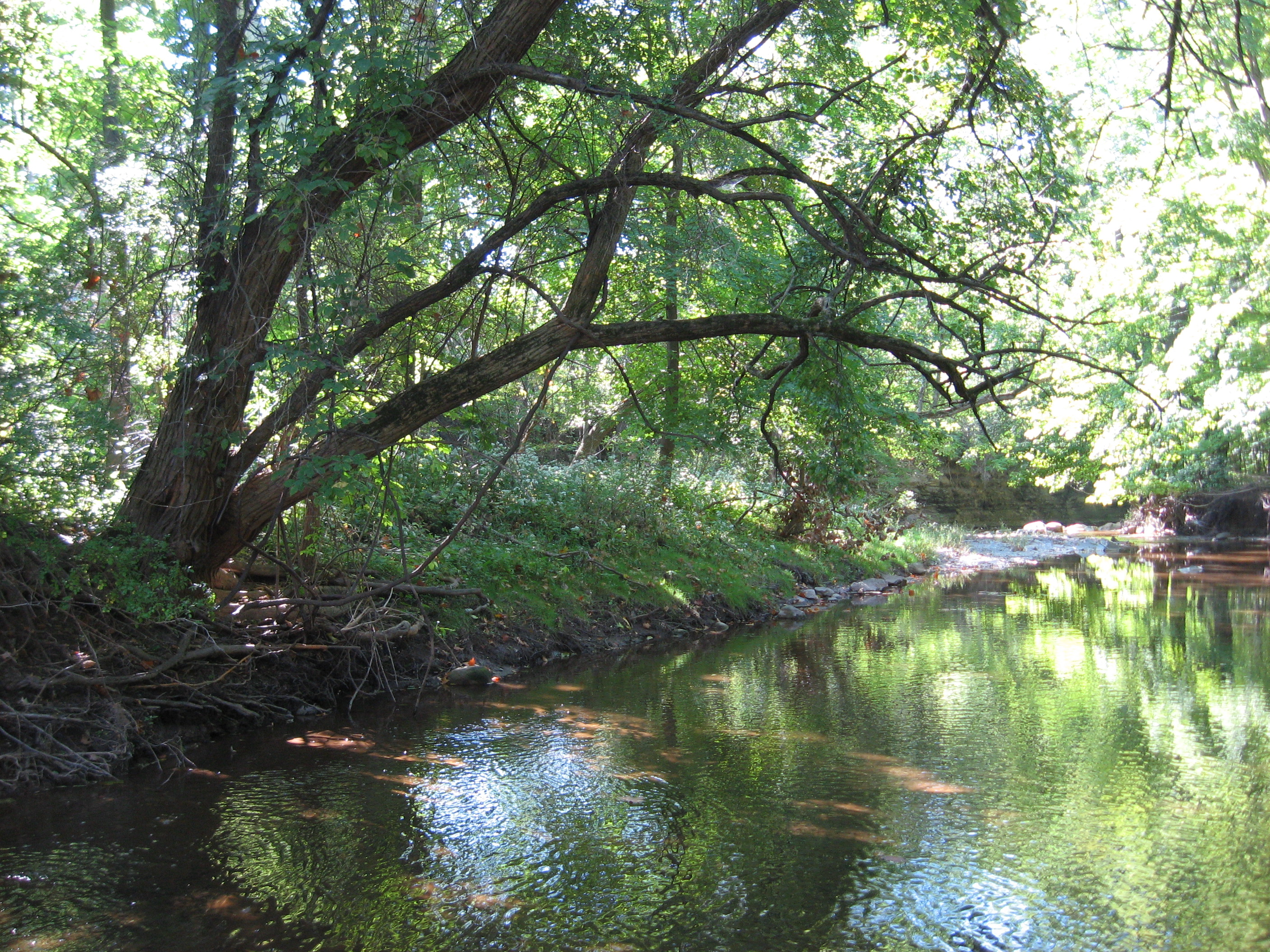
Beaver Creek and its watershed are being actively maintained.

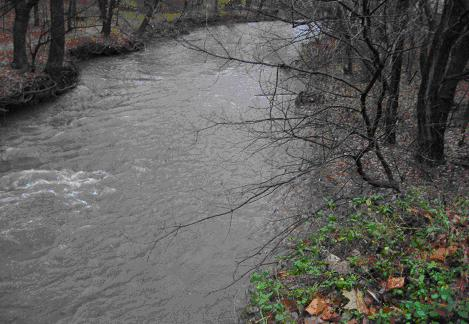
Beaver Creek expands into its floodplain after a sizable rainfall.

Raymond C. and Ruth Vietzen conducted numerous archaeological explorations in the 1940s in Kentucky and Tennessee.
