= Lake Ridge Academy =

Location
- 37501 Center Ridge Road; North Ridgeville, Ohio 44039; United States; 41°22′53″N 82°2′22″W

Information
- Type: Private
- Motto: To aspire is to be.
- Established: 1963; 63 years ago
- Head of school: Mitch White
- Faculty: 60 full-time
- Years offered: K-12
- Enrollment: 379 students
- Average class size: 13 students
- Student to teacher ratio: 8:1
- Campus size: 93 acres
- Campus type: Suburban
- Colors: Blue and Gold
- Athletics: Boys: tennis; basketball; soccer; baseball; Girls: tennis; basketball; soccer; volleyball; Co-ed: golf; cross country; track & field
- Mascot: Lion
- Team name: Royals
- Website: lakeridgeacademy.org

Lake Ridge Academy (LRA) is an independent, nonsectarian day school in North Ridgeville, Ohio, United States.

The school was founded in 1963 and offers co-educational classes from junior kindergarten through grade 12. Lake Ridge Academy is the only independent college preparatory academy on the West Side of Cleveland. The school facilities include 93 acres of open fields, wooded areas, a pond, a creek, tennis courts, track and field track, playing fields.

Lake Ridge Academy is portioned into three divisions: Lower School (JK–5), Middle School (6–8), and Upper School (9–12).

== Campus Facilities ==
The buildings on the Lake Ridge campus include Lower, Middle, and Upper School buildings, the Bettcher Convocation Center, which houses classrooms, a stage, and an auditorium, the Community Resource Center, a building holding four foreign language classrooms, three computer labs, a video lab, a Kiva gathering place, and a K–12 library. The campus also includes Rob Hall, a hardwood floor gymnasium, a Fine Arts Center with Lower, Middle and Upper School art studios, four acoustical vocal and instrumental music rooms, and a Black Box theater.

== Kemper Science and Engineering Building ==
In 2016, a new structure named the Kemper Science and Engineering building was constructed and includes a Chemistry lab, a college-level Engineering lab, and a greenhouse. The Kemper building also offers many classes to students. The two main class disciplines taught in the Kemper building are Engineering and Chemistry. The Kemper building also has a fabrication laboratory. The classes that take place in the chemistry laboratory include Chemistry, Honors Chemistry and AP Chemistry. The Kemper Building is also home to the Institute of Scientific Research and Exploration, as well as the Institute for Engineering and Innovation.

== Recent events ==
Lake Ridge annually participates in the Ohio Center for Law-Related Education's Mock Trial competition, and took first place in the state of Ohio in the 2008 competition. The team moved on to the national competition, held in Wilmington, Delaware, and were ranked 13th in the nation. The team regularly places within the top ten within the State of Ohio OCLRE Mock Trial competition.

In the fall of 2009, the Lake Ridge Women's Soccer team won their first ever district title, narrowly defeating Firelands by a score of 1–0.

On October 25, 2008, the Men's Soccer Program won their second consecutive District Championship and earned a spot in the state's regional semifinals. They ended the season with their best record to date, 15–3–2, surpassing the 2007 record of 15–5. Both the 2007 and 2008 regional semifinals games were lost to St. Thomas Aquinas High School

== Notable alumni ==
- Briefly attended by Brian K. Vaughan, comic book writer.
- Claire Sherman, artist
