= Vermilion, Ohio =

- City
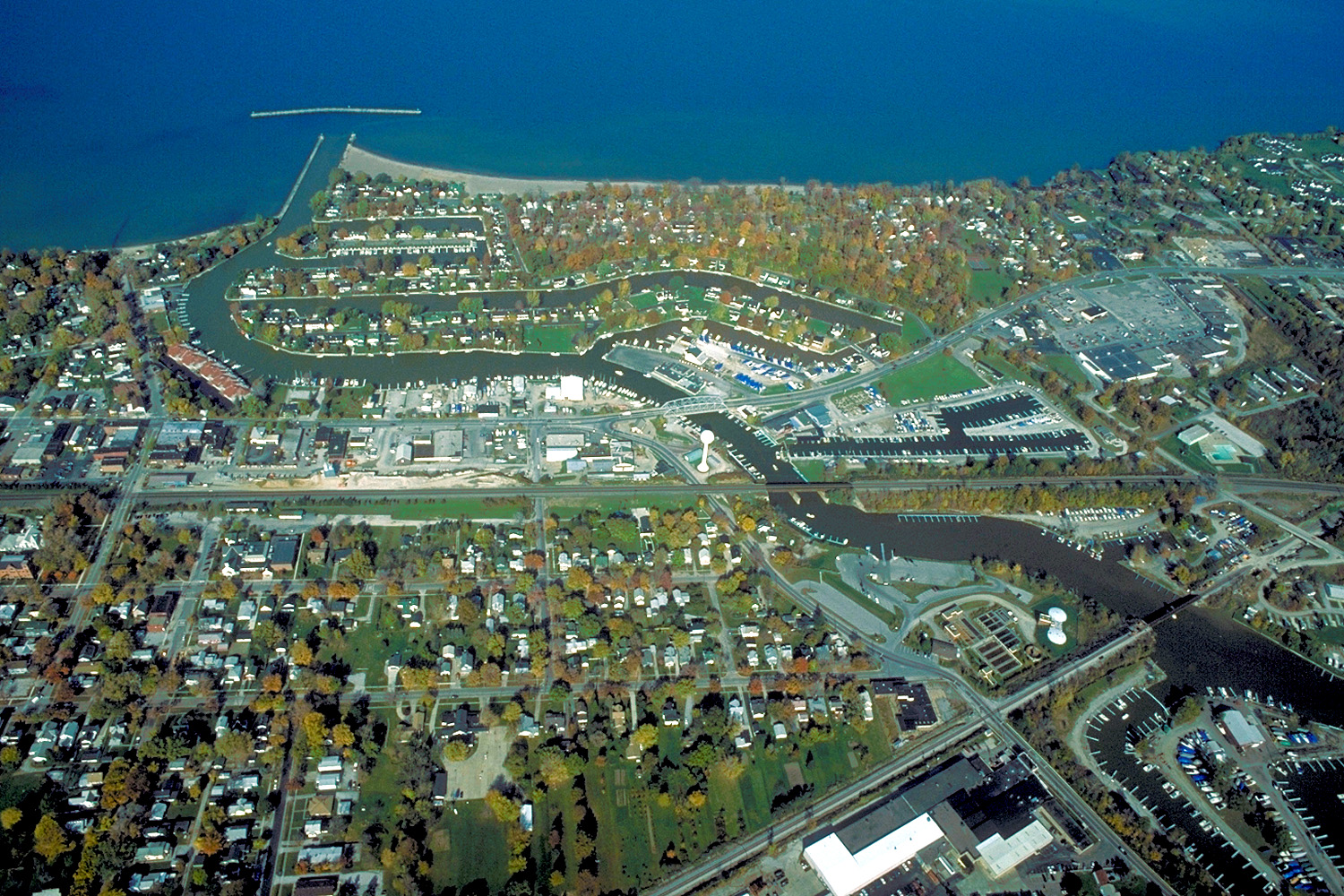
- Aerial view of Vermilion, Ohio. View is to the north over Lake Erie.
- Motto: "A Small Town on a Great Lake"
- Location of Vermilion in Greater Cleveland

- Location within Ohio Location within the United States
- Coordinates: 41°24′45″N 82°20′50″W
- Country: United States
- State: Ohio
- Counties: Lorain, Erie

Government
  - Mayor: Jim Forthofer

Area
  - Total: 10.76 sq mi (27.88 km^{2})
  - Land: 10.60 sq mi (27.46 km^{2})
  - Water: 0.16 sq mi (0.42 km^{2})
- Elevation: 663 ft (202 m)

Population (2020)
  - Total: 10,659
  - Density: 1,005.4/sq mi (388.19/km^{2})
- Time zone: UTC-5 (Eastern (EST))
  - Summer (DST): UTC-4 (EDT)
- ZIP code: 44089
- Area code: 440
- FIPS code: 39-79716
- GNIS feature ID: 2397126
- Website: www.cityofvermilionohio.gov

Vermilion is a city in Erie and Lorain counties in the U.S. state of Ohio, on Lake Erie. Its population was 10,659 at the 2020 census. Located about 35 miles west of Cleveland and 17 miles east of Sandusky, it is part of the Cleveland metropolitan area and Sandusky micropolitan area.

== History ==
Vermilion was initially settled in the early 19th century and incorporated as a village in 1837. The city took its name from the nearby Vermilion River. It developed as a fishing and small-boat harbor. In 1847, the Congress of the United States built the Vermilion Lighthouse to aid navigation on Lake Erie.

As commerce grew in larger nearby cities, the Vermilion River proved inadequate to large commercial traffic. Later, recreational boating became very popular. During the early 20th century, the area became known as a resort community, featuring many beaches and cottages. Most structures were eventually converted to year-round use; many still are used as summer homes or vacation houses. Linwood Park in Vermilion is a good example.

Merging with the nearby village of Vermilion-on-the-Lake in 1960, Vermilion became a city, straddling Lorain and Erie Counties.

A local nonprofit group, Friends of Harbor Town, actively promotes tourism and the historical connection to Vermilion's roots as a maritime community, using the slogan "Harbor Town 1837".

== Geography ==
According to the United States Census Bureau, the city has a total area of 10.8 sq mi (28.0 km^{2}), of which 0.15 sq mi (0.4 km^{2}), or 1.53%, is covered by water.

== Demographics ==
Historical population
Census	Pop.	Note	%±
1860	801		—
1870	721		−10.0%
1880	1,069		48.3%
1900	1,184		—
1910	1,369		15.6%
1920	1,436		4.9%
1930	1,484		3.3%
1940	1,616		8.9%
1950	2,214		37.0%
1960	4,785		116.1%
1970	9,872		106.3%
1980	11,012		11.5%
1990	11,127		1.0%
2000	10,927		−1.8%
2010	10,594		−3.0%
2020	10,659		0.6%
2025 (est.)	10,695		0.3%

=== 2020 census ===
As of the 2020 census, Vermilion had a population of 10,659. The median age was 47.9 years. 18.8% of residents were under the age of 18 and 24.7% of residents were 65 years of age or older. For every 100 females there were 98.5 males, and for every 100 females age 18 and over there were 95.5 males.

88.9% of residents lived in urban areas, while 11.1% lived in rural areas.

There were 4,525 households in Vermilion, of which 24.0% had children under the age of 18 living in them. Of all households, 50.1% were married-couple households, 18.3% were households with a male householder and no spouse or partner present, and 24.4% were households with a female householder and no spouse or partner present. About 28.6% of all households were made up of individuals and 13.6% had someone living alone who was 65 years of age or older.

There were 5,134 housing units, of which 11.9% were vacant. The homeowner vacancy rate was 1.4% and the rental vacancy rate was 5.0%.

Racial composition as of the 2020 census
Race	Number	Percent
White	9,859	92.5%
Black or African American	43	0.4%
American Indian and Alaska Native	18	0.2%
Asian	34	0.3%
Native Hawaiian and Other Pacific Islander	2	0.0%
Some other race	107	1.0%
Two or more races	596	5.6%
Hispanic or Latino (of any race)	396	3.7%

=== 2010 census ===
As of the census of 2010, 10,594 people, 4,183 households, and 3,033 families were residing in the city. The population density was 993.8/sq mi (383.7/km^{2}). The 4,919 housing units averaged 461.4/sq mi (178.1/km^{2}). The racial makeup of the city was 94.8% White, 0.2% African American, 0.2% Native American, 0.3% Asian, 0.1% from other races, and 1.6% from two or more races. Hispanics or Latinos of any race were 2.8% of the population.

Of the 4,183 households, 30.8% had children under 18 living with them, 56.5% were married couples living together, 11.3% had a female householder with no husband present, 4.7% had a male householder with no wife present, and 27.5% were not families; 22.9% of all households were made up of individuals, and 10.1% had someone living alone who was 65 or older. The average household size was 2.50, and the average family size was 2.91.

The median age in the city was 43.5 years; 22.6% of residents were under 18, 7.1% were between 18 and 24, 22.6% were 25 to 44, 31% were 45 to 64, and 16.8% were 65 years of age or older. The gender makeup of the city was 48.6% male and 51.4% female.

=== 2000 census ===
As of the census of 2000, 10,927 people, 4,254 households, and 3,113 families were residing in the city. The racial makeup of the city was 94.8% White, 0.2% African American, 0.2% Native American, 0.3% Asian, 0.08% from other races, and 1.6% from two or more races. Hispanics of any race were 2.8% of the population.

Of the 4,254 households, 32.4% had children under 18 living with them, 59.8% were married couples living together, 9.8% had a female householder with no husband present, and 26.8% were not families. About 22.4% of all households were made up of individuals, and 8.4% had someone living alone who was 65 or older. The average household size was 2.54, and the average family size was 2.97.

In the city, the age distribution was 25.3% under 18, 6.9% from 18 to 24, 27.5% from 25 to 44, 27.6% from 45 to 64, and 12.6% who were 65 or older. The median age was 39 years. For every 100 females, there were 93.8 males. For every 100 females age 18 and over, there were 91.3 males.

The median income for a household in the city was $29,926, and for a family was $57,311. Males had a median income of $41,269 versus $25,195 for females. The per capita income for the city was $23,635. About 4.1% of families and 5.4% of the population were below the poverty line, including 5.6% of those under age 18 and 6.8% of those age 65 or over.

== Arts and culture ==
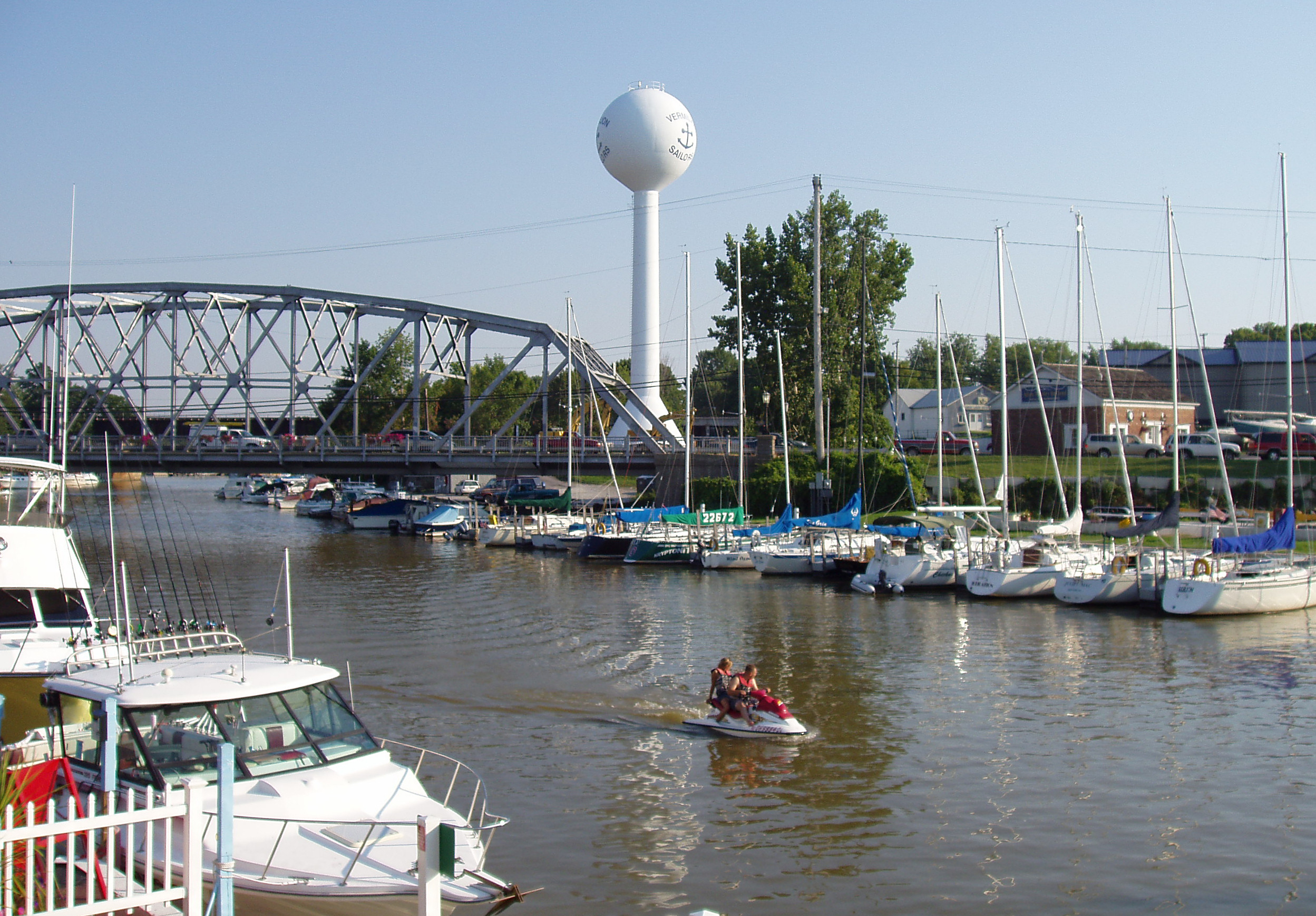
Vermilion river marina

Vermilion was previously described as the "Village of Lake Captains", with many captains' homes in the Harbor Town Historic District. Housing styles in the district include Victorian, Italianate, Arts and Crafts, and Queen Anne. Community-wide revitalization efforts have been promoted since the 1970s, encouraging property owners and citizens to retain historic qualities. The Vermilion Lagoons neighborhood is one of the first planned residential communities on the water in the US, with construction starting in 1928.

=== Cultural attractions ===
Over 150,000 people visit Vermilion for the Woollybear Festival; it includes the longest parade in Ohio.

The Festival of the Fish is a three-day event each June.

== Parks and recreation ==
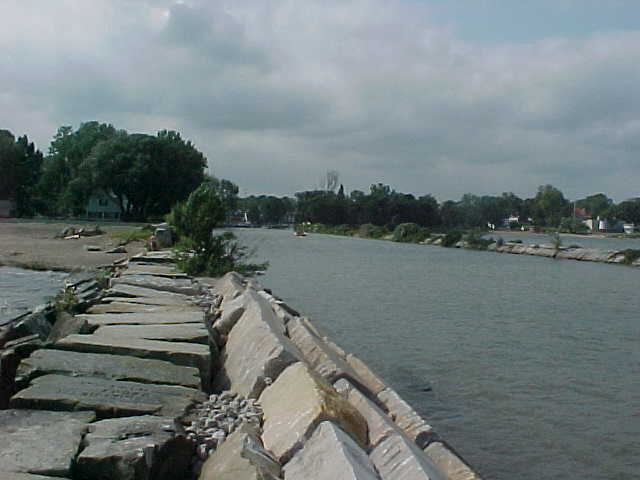
Harbor entrance

Vermilion harbor features sandy beaches, recreational boating, jet skis, canoeing, and sailboats. Shipbuilding was once the major industry there.

Vermilion is home to over 12 parks and facilities, including the Vermilion River Reservation, featuring the Bacon Woods and Mill Hollow areas on each side of the Vermilion River, which runs through the reservation and directly out to Lake Erie. Picnic shelters and trails are located in Vermilion.

== Education ==
The Vermilion School System provides public school education for area children from kindergarten through 12th grade, with vocational and professional education opportunities at the EHOVE Career Center. The Vermilion Institute of Technology (VIT) is a private, independent scholars institute involved in teaching and research. VIT delivers certification programs for electrical technicians, appliance repair, and structured innovation and inventive problem solving (TRIZ) for science, engineering, business, healthcare, and government.

Lake Ridge Academy, a private grade school and high school in nearby North Ridgeville, offers daily school bus service for Vermilion students.

St. Mary's parochial school has been serving preschool and grades K–6 since 1956

The Lucy Idol Center, located on the edge of town, offers nonresidential care for disabled children and adults. Bowling Green State University (Firelands campus) and Lorain County Community College, both accredited schools offering four-year and advanced degrees, are located within a 20-minute drive of Vermilion.

Vermilion High School's sports teams are named the Sailors.

== Notable people ==
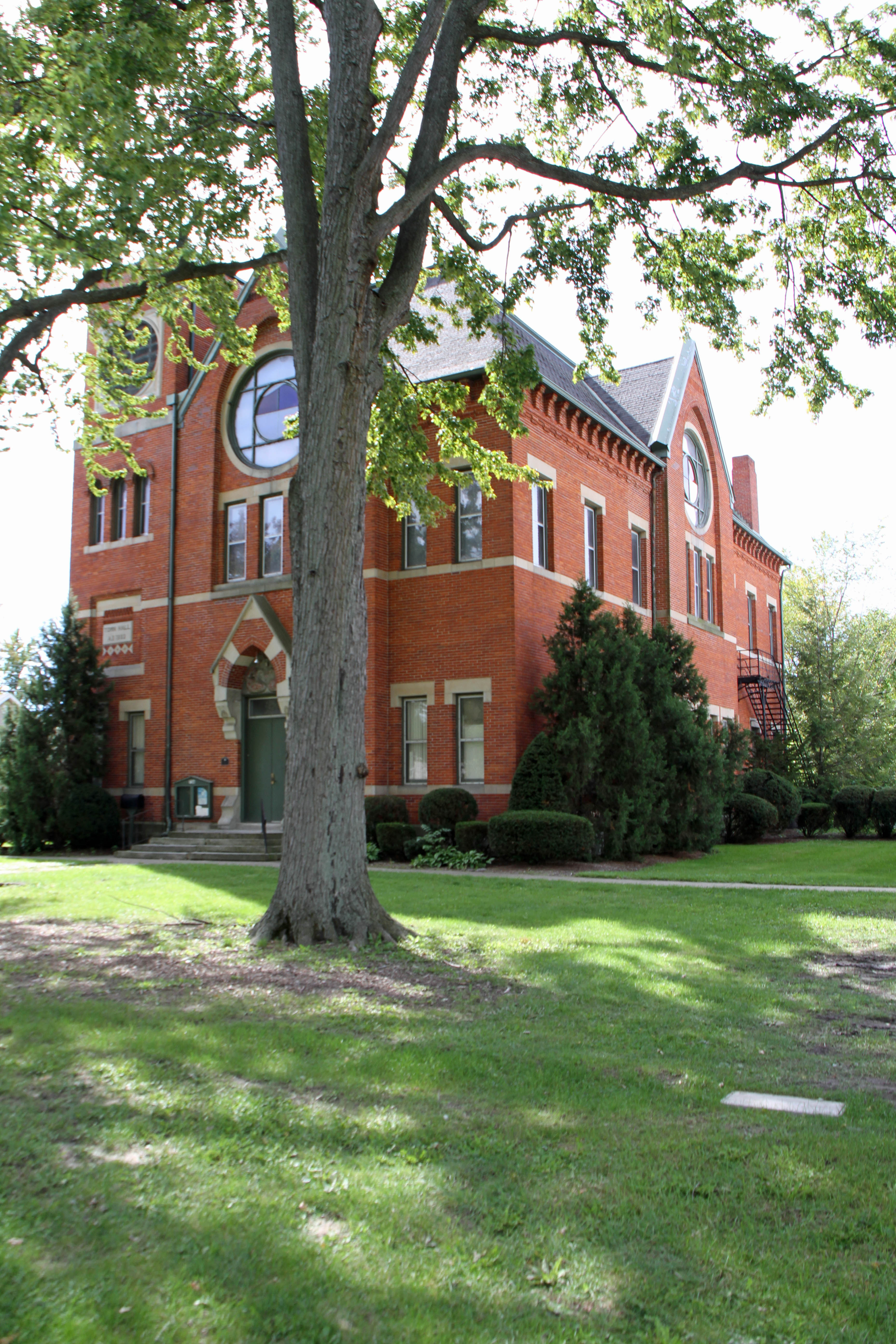
Vermilion Town Hall

- Albert D. Baumhart, Jr., member of the United States House of Representatives
- Phoebe Judson, American pioneer
- Allie LaForce, Miss Ohio Teen USA 2005, Miss Teen USA 2005
- Andy Oliver, former Major League Baseball pitcher
- Lester Allan Pelton, inventor of the Pelton wheel impulse water turbine
- Sophia Steinbrenner, president of Great Lakes shipping fleet, Kinsman Transit
- Alta Weiss, the "Girl Wonder" semi-pro pitcher for the Vermilion Independents minor league baseball team (1907)

== Sister city ==
Vermilion's sister city is Paimpol, France.
