= National Register of Historic Places listings in Sandusky, Ohio =

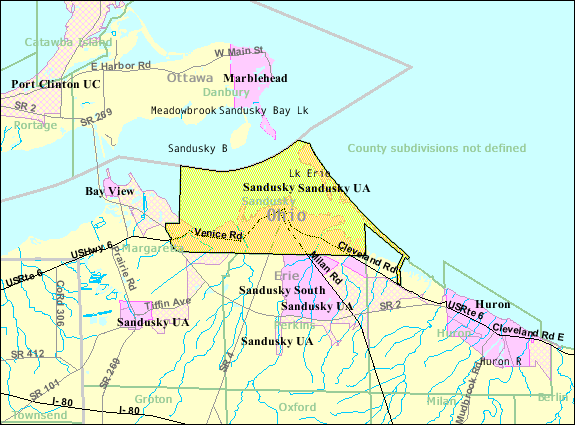
Sandusky and its surrounding area

This is a list of the National Register of Historic Places listings in Sandusky, Ohio.

This is intended to be a complete list of the properties and districts on the National Register of Historic Places in Sandusky, Ohio, United States. Latitude and longitude coordinates are provided for many National Register properties and districts; these locations may be seen together in an online map.

There are 178 properties and districts listed on the National Register in Erie County, including 2 National Historic Landmarks. The city of Sandusky is the location of 114 of these properties and districts; they are listed here, while the remaining 64 sites, including both National Historic Landmarks, are listed separately. Another 3 properties were once listed but have been removed.

This National Park Service list is complete through NPS recent listings posted February 27, 2026.

== Current listings ==
| | Name on the Register | Image | Date listed | Location | Description |
|---|---|---|---|---|---|
| 1 | Adams Street Double House | Adams Street Double House | October 10, 1975 (#75001384) | 106-108 E. Adams St. 41°27′13″N 82°42′35″W | |
| 2 | Barker School | Barker School | October 20, 1982 (#82001374) | 1925 Barker St. 41°26′43″N 82°43′38″W | |
| 3 | Freeland T. Barney House | Freeland T. Barney House | October 20, 1982 (#82001375) | 215-213 Fulton St. 41°27′14″N 82°42′59″W | |
| 4 | Bates-Cockrem House | Bates-Cockrem House | October 20, 1982 (#82001376) | 325 Lawrence St. 41°27′07″N 82°43′01″W | |
| 5 | Bavarian Brewery | Bavarian Brewery | October 20, 1982 (#82001377) | 1816-1820 W. Jefferson St. 41°26′56″N 82°43′32″W | |
| 6 | Lucas Beecher House | Lucas Beecher House | May 7, 1979 (#79001827) | 215 W. Washington Row; 41°27′18″N 82°42′44″W | |
| 7 | Bing's Hotel | Bing's Hotel | October 20, 1982 (#82001378) | 302 E. Water St. 41°27′29″N 82°42′32″W | |
| 8 | John Boalt House | John Boalt House | October 20, 1982 (#82001379) | 631 Wayne St. 41°27′03″N 82°42′25″W | |
| 9 | Boeckling Building | Boeckling Building | October 20, 1982 (#82001380) | 103-105 W. Shoreline Dr. 41°27′28″N 82°42′47″W | |
| 10 | G.A. Boeckling House | G.A. Boeckling House | January 20, 1983 (#83001960) | 614 Columbus Ave. 41°27′03″N 82°42′30″W | |
| 11 | G.A. BOECKLING (side-paddlewheel steamboat) | G.A. BOECKLING (side-paddlewheel steamboat) | March 3, 1983 (#83001959) | Jackson Street Dock; 41°27′29″N 82°42′52″W | Burned to the waterline in 1989. |
| 12 | Boy with the Boot Fountain | Boy with the Boot Fountain | October 20, 1982 (#82001381) | W. Washington St. Park; 41°27′16″N 82°42′46″W | |
| 13 | Cable Park Historic District | Cable Park Historic District | January 21, 1988 (#87002506) | 1103-1234 Wayne St. 41°26′47″N 82°42′14″W | |
| 14 | Frank Cable House | Frank Cable House | October 20, 1982 (#82001382) | 809 W. Washington St. 41°27′11″N 82°43′01″W | |
| 15 | Laurence Cable House | Laurence Cable House | October 20, 1982 (#82001383) | 910 W. Monroe St. 41°26′52″N 82°42′54″W | |
| 16 | Campbell School | Campbell School | October 20, 1982 (#82001384) | 1215 Campbell St. 41°26′44″N 82°42′25″W | |
| 17 | Carnegie Library | Carnegie Library | November 12, 1975 (#75001385) | Adams and Columbus Ave. 41°27′12″N 82°42′38″W | |
| 18 | Cedar Point Light | Cedar Point Light | July 19, 1984 (#84003667) | Cedar Point amusement park 41°29′17″N 82°41′37″W | Originally listed in 1982 as the "U.S. Coast Guard Building" |
| 19 | Coliseum | Coliseum | October 20, 1982 (#82001385) | Main Midway at Cedar Point amusement park 41°28′53″N 82°40′54″W | |
| 20 | Columbus Avenue Historic District | Columbus Avenue Historic District | January 20, 1983 (#83001961) | 102-162 Columbus Ave. 41°27′25″N 82°42′43″W | |
| 21 | Commercial Banking & Trust Co. | Commercial Banking & Trust Co. | October 20, 1982 (#82001386) | 115 E. Washington Row; 41°27′20″N 82°42′39″W | |
| 22 | Converse-Mertz Apartments | Converse-Mertz Apartments | October 20, 1982 (#82001388) | 301-303 E. Washington St. 41°27′23″N 82°42′28″W | |
| 23 | Eleutheros Cooke House | Eleutheros Cooke House | October 20, 1982 (#82001390) | 410 Columbus Ave. 41°27′12″N 82°42′35″W | |
| 24 | Eleutheros Cooke House | Eleutheros Cooke House | October 20, 1982 (#82001389) | 1415 Columbus Ave. 41°26′38″N 82°42′18″W | |
| 25 | Cooke-Robertson House | Cooke-Robertson House | October 20, 1982 (#82001387) | 412 Columbus Ave. 41°27′12″N 82°42′35″W | |
| 26 | William D. Curtis House | William D. Curtis House | October 20, 1982 (#82001391) | 1411 Hayes Ave. 41°26′35″N 82°42′38″W | |
| 27 | William H. Dentzel 1921 Carousel | William H. Dentzel 1921 Carousel | November 8, 1990 (#90000627) | Frontiertown at Cedar Point amusement park 41°29′04″N 82°41′32″W | |
| 28 | William H. Dentzel 1924 Carousel | William H. Dentzel 1924 Carousel | November 8, 1990 (#90000625) | Kiddy Kingdom at Cedar Point amusement park 41°28′51″N 82°40′51″W | |
| 29 | George J. Doerzbach House | George J. Doerzbach House | April 23, 1987 (#87000639) | 1208-1210 Central Ave. 41°26′44″N 82°42′51″W | |
| 30 | Downtown Sandusky Commercial Historic District | Downtown Sandusky Commercial Historic District | December 12, 2017 (#100001899) | Roughly bounded by Shoreline Dr., Washington Row, and Hancock and Decatur Sts. 41°27′24″N 82°42′43″W | |
| 31 | Emmanuel Church | Emmanuel Church | October 20, 1982 (#82001392) | 334 Columbus Ave. 41°27′14″N 82°42′37″W | |
| 32 | Engels And Krudwig Wine Company Buildings | Engels And Krudwig Wine Company Buildings | July 30, 1976 (#76001417) | 220 E. Water St. 41°27′28″N 82°42′35″W | |
| 33 | Herman Engels House | Herman Engels House | October 20, 1982 (#82001393) | 117 Hancock St. 41°27′28″N 82°42′32″W | |
| 34 | Engine House No. 1 | Engine House No. 1 | October 20, 1982 (#82001394) | 901 W. Market St. 41°27′15″N 82°43′06″W | |
| 35 | Engine House No. 3 | Engine House No. 3 | April 1, 1975 (#75001386) | Meigs St. and Sycamore Line; 41°27′09″N 82°41′53″W | |
| 36 | Erie County Jail | Erie County Jail | October 20, 1982 (#82001395) | 204 W. Adams St. 41°27′11″N 82°42′40″W | |
| 37 | Erie County Office Building | Erie County Office Building | November 20, 1974 (#74001470) | 1202 Sycamore Line; 41°26′52″N 82°41′49″W | |
| 38 | Erie County Oil Products Co. | Erie County Oil Products Co. | October 20, 1982 (#82001396) | 649 Tiffin Ave. 41°26′48″N 82°43′37″W | |
| 39 | Exchange Hotel | Exchange Hotel | October 29, 1975 (#75001388) | 202-204 E. Water St. 41°27′28″N 82°42′37″W | Burned down in 1977. |
| 40 | Facer's Store | Facer's Store | October 20, 1982 (#82001397) | 279 E. Market St. 41°27′26″N 82°42′31″W | |
| 41 | Feick Building | Feick Building | October 22, 2009 (#09000848) | 158-160 E. Market St. 41°27′22″N 82°42′38″W | |
| 42 | First Church of Christ, Scientist | First Church of Christ, Scientist | October 20, 1982 (#82001398) | 128 E. Adams St. 41°27′14″N 82°42′32″W | |
| 43 | First Congregational Church | First Congregational Church | October 20, 1982 (#82001399) | 431 Columbus Ave. 41°27′09″N 82°42′36″W | |
| 44 | Follett-Moss-Moss Residences | Follett-Moss-Moss Residences | December 31, 1974 (#74001471) | 404, 414, 428 Wayne St. 41°27′13″N 82°42′28″W | |
| 45 | Fox's Brewery-Diamond Wine Co. | Fox's Brewery-Diamond Wine Co. | October 20, 1982 (#82001400) | 334 Harrison St. 41°27′03″N 82°43′29″W | |
| 46 | Godfrey-Johnson House | Godfrey-Johnson House | October 20, 1982 (#82001401) | 417 Columbus Ave. 41°27′11″N 82°42′37″W | |
| 47 | Grace Episcopal Church | Grace Episcopal Church | October 20, 1982 (#82001402) | 315 Wayne St. 41°27′17″N 82°42′34″W | |
| 48 | Henry Graefe House | Henry Graefe House | October 20, 1982 (#82001403) | 1429 Columbus Ave. 41°26′36″N 82°42′17″W | William Warren Sabin architect |
| 49 | Great American Racing Derby | Great American Racing Derby | November 8, 1990 (#90000626) | Main Midway at Cedar Point amusement park 41°28′50″N 82°41′00″W | |
| 50 | Rice Harper House | Rice Harper House | October 20, 1982 (#82001404) | 403 E. Washington St. 41°27′25″N 82°42′22″W | |
| 51 | Hemminger Saloon | Hemminger Saloon | October 20, 1982 (#82001405) | 333 W. Market St. 41°27′20″N 82°42′51″W | |
| 52 | Hinde & Dauch Paper Co. | Hinde & Dauch Paper Co. | October 20, 1982 (#82001408) | 407 Decatur St. 41°27′08″N 82°42′48″W | |
| 53 | Hinde & Dauch Paper Co. | Hinde & Dauch Paper Co. | October 20, 1982 (#82001407) | 401 W. Shoreline Dr. 41°27′28″N 82°42′55″W | |
| 54 | Hinde & Dauch Paper Co. | Hinde & Dauch Paper Co. | October 20, 1982 (#82001406) | 409 W. Water St. 41°27′24″N 82°42′54″W | Demolished between 2013 and 2014. |
| 55 | James J. Hinde House | James J. Hinde House | October 20, 1982 (#82001409) | 317 Fulton St. 41°27′09″N 82°42′57″W | |
| 56 | Holy Angels Church | Holy Angels Church | October 20, 1982 (#82001410) | W. Jefferson St. at Tiffin Ave. and Clinton St. 41°26′57″N 82°43′23″W | |
| 57 | Hotel Rieger | Hotel Rieger | June 10, 2005 (#05000578) | 232 Jackson St. 41°27′19″N 82°42′47″W | |
| 58 | Lester Hubbard House | Lester Hubbard House | October 20, 1982 (#82001411) | 134 E. Adams St. 41°27′14″N 82°42′31″W | |
| 59 | S.B. Hubbard House | S.B. Hubbard House | October 20, 1982 (#82001412) | 1205 Columbus Ave. 41°26′43″N 82°42′21″W | |
| 60 | Independent Order of Odd Fellows Temple | Independent Order of Odd Fellows Temple | May 1, 2003 (#03000327) | 231 W. Washington Row; 41°27′18″N 82°42′46″W | |
| 61 | Jackson Jr. High School | Jackson Jr. High School | October 20, 1982 (#82001413) | 414 W. Madison St. 41°27′01″N 82°42′42″W | |
| 62 | Kerber's Marine Grocery | Kerber's Marine Grocery | October 20, 1982 (#82001414) | 1006 Tiffin Ave. 41°26′46″N 82°43′37″W | |
| 63 | August Kuebeler House | August Kuebeler House | October 20, 1982 (#82001416) | 1319 Tiffin Ave. 41°26′40″N 82°43′46″W | |
| 64 | Kuebeler-Stang Block | Kuebeler-Stang Block | October 20, 1982 (#82001415) | 634 Hancock St. 41°27′05″N 82°42′18″W | |
| 65 | Lake Shore And Michigan Southern Railroad Depot | Lake Shore And Michigan Southern Railroad Depot | July 17, 1975 (#75001389) | N. Depot at Carr St. 41°26′26″N 82°43′07″W | |
| 66 | Ebenezer Lane House | Ebenezer Lane House | October 20, 1982 (#82001417) | 318 Huron Ave. 41°27′18″N 82°42′31″W | |
| 67 | Lea Block | Lea Block | October 20, 1982 (#82001418) | 174-186 E. Market St. 41°27′23″N 82°42′37″W | |
| 68 | Henry Lotz Store | Henry Lotz Store | October 20, 1982 (#82001419) | 1119 W. Washington St. 41°27′08″N 82°43′13″W | |
| 69 | Mad River Block | Mad River Block | October 16, 1974 (#74001472) | 1002-1018 W. Adams St. 41°27′03″N 82°43′06″W | |
| 70 | Ogden Mallory House | Ogden Mallory House | October 20, 1982 (#82001420) | 410 Warren St. 41°27′20″N 82°42′13″W | |
| 71 | George March House | George March House | October 20, 1982 (#82001421) | 532 Wayne St. 41°27′08″N 82°42′25″W | |
| 72 | James E. Marshall House | James E. Marshall House | October 20, 1982 (#82001422) | 514 Wayne St. 41°27′08″N 82°42′26″W | |
| 73 | McKenster-Groff House | McKenster-Groff House | October 20, 1982 (#82001423) | 334 E. Washington St. 41°27′22″N 82°42′23″W | |
| 74 | William Gordon Melville-Milne House | William Gordon Melville-Milne House | March 28, 1979 (#79001828) | 319 Lawrence St. 41°27′07″N 82°43′02″W | |
| 75 | John Mertz House | John Mertz House | August 21, 1992 (#92001077) | 610 W. Washington St. 41°27′12″N 82°42′55″W | |
| 76 | Monroe School | Monroe School | October 20, 1982 (#82001424) | 328 E. Monroe St. 41°27′05″N 82°42′13″W | |
| 77 | Moss-Foster House | Moss-Foster House | October 20, 1982 (#82001425) | 621 Wayne St. 41°27′04″N 82°42′26″W | |
| 78 | Daniel C. Muller Carousel | Daniel C. Muller Carousel | October 20, 1982 (#82001426) | Main Midway at Cedar Point amusement park 41°28′44″N 82°40′46″W | |
| 79 | Murschel House | Murschel House | October 20, 1982 (#82001427) | 1221 N. Depot St. 41°26′28″N 82°43′06″W | |
| 80 | No. 5 Fire Station | No. 5 Fire Station | October 20, 1982 (#82001428) | W. Madison and Tiffin Ave. 41°26′51″N 82°43′33″W | Cut limestone building; held horse-drawn equipment. |
| 81 | Old First Church | Old First Church | October 20, 1982 (#82001430) | 265 Jackson St. 41°27′16″N 82°42′47″W | |
| 82 | Osborne School | Osborne School | October 20, 1982 (#82001431) | 922 W. Osborne St. 41°26′32″N 82°42′55″W | |
| 83 | Red Popcorn Wagon | Red Popcorn Wagon | October 20, 1982 (#82001432) | 102 W. Washington Row; 41°27′18″N 82°42′41″W | |
| 84 | Joseph Root House | Joseph Root House | October 20, 1982 (#82001433) | 231 E. Adams St. 41°27′18″N 82°42′27″W | |
| 85 | Ross Hardware | Ross Hardware | October 20, 1982 (#82001434) | 708 Hancock St. 41°27′04″N 82°42′17″W | |
| 86 | St. Mary's Catholic Church | St. Mary's Catholic Church | October 10, 1975 (#75001391) | 429 Central Ave. 41°27′05″N 82°42′50″W | |
| 87 | St. Mary's Girls Grade School | St. Mary's Girls Grade School | October 20, 1982 (#82001438) | 514 Decatur St. 41°27′04″N 82°42′44″W | |
| 88 | St. Mary's Rectory | St. Mary's Rectory | October 20, 1982 (#82001439) | 429 Central Ave. 41°27′06″N 82°42′49″W | |
| 89 | St. Mary's School | St. Mary's School | October 20, 1982 (#82001440) | 410 W. Jefferson St. 41°27′05″N 82°43′25″W | |
| 90 | Sts. Peter & Paul Church and Rectory | Sts. Peter & Paul Church and Rectory | January 20, 1983 (#83001963) | Columbus Ave. at E. Jefferson St. 41°27′08″N 82°42′32″W | |
| 91 | St. Stephen's AME Church | St. Stephen's AME Church | October 20, 1982 (#82001441) | 312 Neil St. 41°26′56″N 82°42′11″W | |
| 92 | Schine State Theatre | Schine State Theatre | October 20, 1982 (#82001435) | 101-109 Columbus Ave. 41°27′25″N 82°42′45″W | |
| 93 | Second Baptist Church | Second Baptist Church | May 14, 2002 (#02000061) | 315 Decatur St. 41°27′12″N 82°42′51″W | |
| 94 | Walter Simpson House | Walter Simpson House | October 20, 1982 (#82001436) | 521 Hancock St. 41°27′10″N 82°42′22″W | |
| 95 | William A. Simpson House | William A. Simpson House | October 20, 1982 (#82001437) | 230 E. Washington St. 41°27′21″N 82°42′29″W | |
| 96 | Rush R. Sloane House | Rush R. Sloane House | February 24, 1975 (#75001390) | 403 E. Adams St. 41°27′20″N 82°42′19″W | |
| 97 | John Stang House | John Stang House | October 20, 1982 (#82001442) | 629 Columbus Ave. 41°27′01″N 82°42′31″W | |
| 98 | Henry Stoffel Blacksmith Shop | Henry Stoffel Blacksmith Shop | October 20, 1982 (#82001443) | 321 E. Market St. (rear); 41°27′28″N 82°42′28″W | |
| 99 | Adam J. Stoll House | Adam J. Stoll House | October 20, 1982 (#82001444) | 531 Wayne St. 41°27′07″N 82°42′27″W | |
| 100 | Stone's Block | Stone's Block | October 20, 1982 (#82001445) | 202 Columbus Ave. 41°27′22″N 82°42′41″W | |
| 101 | Sycamore School | Sycamore School | November 19, 1974 (#74001473) | 3rd and Sycamore Sts. 41°27′03″N 82°41′51″W | |
| 102 | Taylor-Frohman House | Taylor-Frohman House | October 20, 1982 (#82001446) | 1315 Columbus Ave. 41°26′40″N 82°42′19″W | |
| 103 | Third National Bank | Third National Bank | October 20, 1982 (#82001447) | 220 W. Market St. 41°27′20″N 82°42′46″W | |
| 104 | William T. Townsend House | William T. Townsend House | October 20, 1982 (#82001448) | 515 W. Washington St. 41°27′14″N 82°42′54″W | |
| 105 | U.S. Post Office | U.S. Post Office | October 20, 1982 (#82001450) | W. Washington and Jackson Sts. 41°27′14″N 82°42′46″W | |
| 106 | Ernst Von Schulenburg House | Ernst Von Schulenburg House | October 20, 1982 (#82001451) | 922 W. Adams St. 41°27′04″N 82°43′02″W | |
| 107 | James Wadsworth House | James Wadsworth House | October 20, 1982 (#82001452) | 519 Huron Ave. 41°27′12″N 82°42′18″W | |
| 108 | Wagner Palace | Wagner Palace | October 20, 1982 (#82001453) | 804-806 Hayes Ave. 41°26′55″N 82°42′27″W | |
| 109 | Water Street Commercial Buildings | Water Street Commercial Buildings | March 18, 1975 (#75001392) | 101-165 E. Water St. and 101-231 W. Water St. 41°27′26″N 82°42′45″W | |
| 110 | West Market School | West Market School | October 20, 1982 (#82001454) | 211 Fulton St. 41°27′15″N 82°43′00″W | |
| 111 | Samuel M. White House | Samuel M. White House | June 16, 1976 (#76001419) | 304 E. Adams St. 41°27′17″N 82°42′25″W | |
| 112 | Wichman's Grocery | Wichman's Grocery | October 20, 1982 (#82001455) | 1118 W. Washington St. 41°27′06″N 82°43′13″W | |
| 113 | Willdred Flats | Willdred Flats | March 11, 1993 (#93000152) | 1116 Columbus Ave. 41°26′47″N 82°42′20″W | |
| 114 | Zion Lutheran Church | Zion Lutheran Church | October 20, 1982 (#82001456) | 501-503 Columbus Ave. 41°27′08″N 82°42′35″W | |

== Former listings ==
| | Name on the Register | Image | Date listed | Date removed | Location | Description |
|---|---|---|---|---|---|---|
| 1 | Baltimore and Ohio Railroad Company Depot | Baltimore and Ohio Railroad Company Depot | September 13, 1978 (#78002057) | May 5, 1983 | Washington and Warren Sts. 41°27′25″N 82°42′18″W | |
| 2 | Hotel Breakers | Hotel Breakers | April 22, 1982 (#82003565) | June 6, 2001 | Cedar Point; 41°29′28″N 82°41′16″W | |
| 3 | Ohio Theatre | Ohio Theatre | October 20, 1982 (#82001429) | October 29, 1985 | 205-211 W. Market St. 41°27′22″N 82°42′45″W | |

== See also ==
- List of National Historic Landmarks in Ohio
- National Register of Historic Places listings in Ohio
