= William H. Hunter =

American politician

Member of the U.S. House of Representatives from Ohio's 14th district
- In office March 4, 1837 – March 3, 1839
- Preceded by: William Patterson
- Succeeded by: George Sweeny

Personal details
- Born: Unknown Frankfort, Kentucky, U.S.
- Died: 1842 Sandusky, Ohio, U.S.
- Resting place: Cholera Cemetery
- Party: Democratic

William H. Hunter (died 1842) was a 19th-century American lawyer who served one term as a U.S. representative from Ohio from 1837 to 1839.

== Biography ==
Born in Frankfort, Kentucky, Hunter completed preparatory studies and later studied law.

=== Early career ===
He was admitted to the bar and commenced practice in Tiffin, Ohio. He moved to Norwalk, Ohio, about 1825 and continued the practice of his profession for several years. He subsequently moved to Sandusky, Ohio, and was appointed collector of customs there in 1835.

=== Congress ===
Hunter was elected as a Democrat to the Twenty-fifth Congress (March 4, 1837 – March 3, 1839).

=== Death and burial ===
Hunter died under mysterious circumstances near Sandusky in 1842. He was interred in the Cholera Cemetery.

== Sources ==
- United States Congress. "William H. Hunter (id: H000993)". Biographical Directory of the United States Congress.

U.S. House of Representatives
Preceded by William Patterson	Member of the U.S. House of Representatives from Ohio's 14th congressional district 1837–1839	Succeeded by George Sweeny
