= William Patterson (Ohio politician) =

American politician

Member of the U.S. House of Representatives from Ohio's 14th district
- In office March 4, 1833 – March 3, 1837
- Preceded by: Eleutheros Cooke
- Succeeded by: William H. Hunter

Personal details
- Born: 1790 Maryland, U.S.
- Died: August 17, 1868 (aged 77–78) Van Wert, Ohio, U.S.
- Resting place: Mansfield Cemetery, Mansfield, Ohio
- Party: Jacksonian

Military service
- Allegiance: United States
- Branch/service: United States Army
- Battles/wars: War of 1812

William Patterson (1790 – August 17, 1868) was a United States representative from Ohio.

Patterson was born in Maryland, and moved to Mansfield, Ohio where he completed preparatory studies and studied law. Patterson was a soldier in the War of 1812 He was admitted to the bar and practiced, and held several local offices. He was an associate judge of the Court of Common Pleas in 1820 and 1827, and was elected as a Jacksonian Democrat to the Twenty-third and Twenty-fourth Congresses, holding office from March 4, 1833 to March 3, 1837.

Patterson spent the later years of his life in Van Wert County with his children. Patterson died in Van Wert, Ohio in 1868, and was interred at Mansfield Cemetery, Mansfield.

U.S. House of Representatives
Preceded by Eleutheros Cooke	Member of the U.S. House of Representatives from Ohio's 14th congressional district 1833-1837	Succeeded by William H. Hunter
