= George Sweeny =

American politician

Member of the U.S. House of Representatives from Ohio's 14th district
- In office March 4, 1839 – March 3, 1843
- Preceded by: William H. Hunter
- Succeeded by: Alexander Harper

Personal details
- Born: February 22, 1796 Gettysburg, Pennsylvania, U.S.
- Died: October 10, 1877 (aged 81) Bucyrus, Ohio, U.S.
- Resting place: Oakwood Cemetery, Bucyrus
- Party: Democratic
- Education: Dickinson College

George Sweeny (February 22, 1796 – October 10, 1877) was a 19th-century lawyer and politician who served two terms as a U.S. representative from Ohio from 1839 to 1843.

== Biography ==
Born near Gettysburg, Pennsylvania, Sweeny was a graduate of Dickinson College, Carlisle, Pennsylvania. A lawyer, he was admitted to the bar and commenced practice in Gettysburg in 1820, moving to Bucyrus, Ohio, in 1830.

He served as prosecuting attorney of Crawford County in 1838.

=== Congress ===
Sweeny was elected as a Democrat to the Twenty-sixth and Twenty-seventh Congresses (March 4, 1839 – March 3, 1843). He was not a candidate for renomination in 1842.

=== Later career and death ===
He returned to the practice of law in Ohio, including another term as prosecutor in Crawford County.

He died in Bucyrus, Ohio, October 10, 1877.

== Sources ==
- United States Congress. "George Sweeny (id: S001105)". Biographical Directory of the United States Congress.

U.S. House of Representatives
Preceded by William H. Hunter	Member of the U.S. House of Representatives from Ohio's 14th congressional district 1839–1843	Succeeded by Alexander Harper
