= Eleutheros Cooke =

American politician

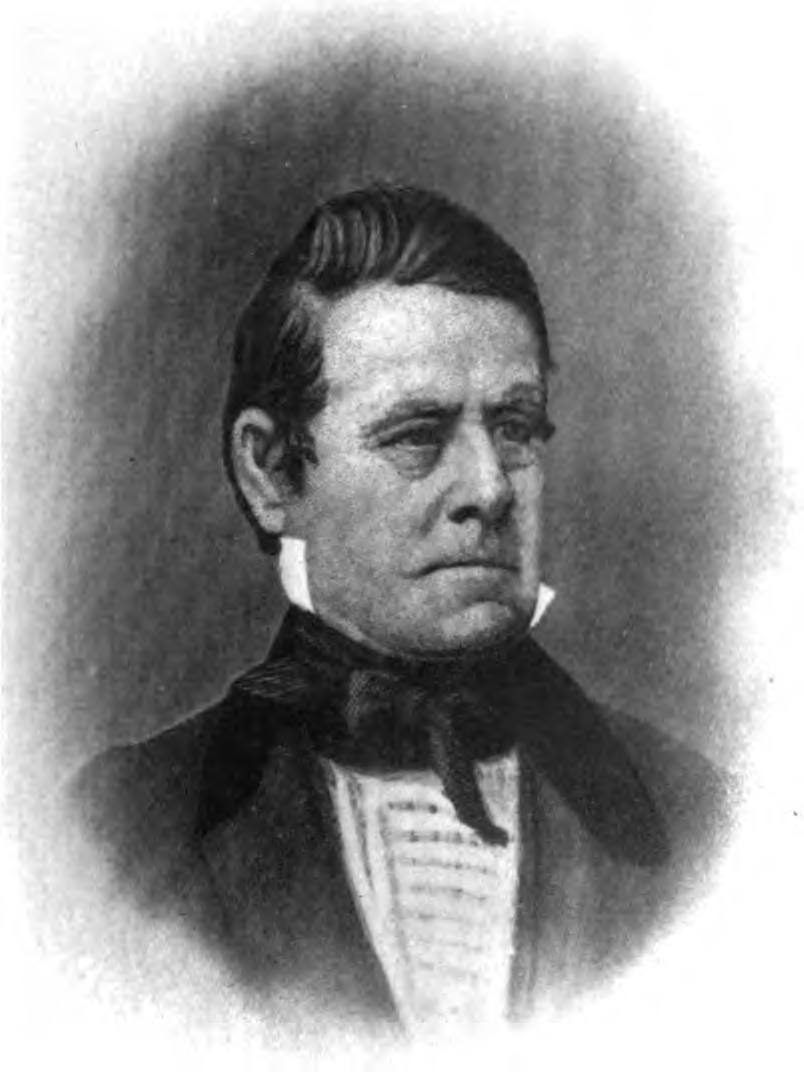

Member of the U.S. House of Representatives from Ohio's 14th district
- In office March 4, 1831 – March 3, 1833
- Preceded by: Mordecai Bartley
- Succeeded by: William Patterson

Member of the Ohio House of Representatives from the Huron County district
- In office December 2, 1822 – December 5, 1824
- Preceded by: Lyman Farwell
- Succeeded by: Almon Ruggles
- In office December 5, 1825 – December 3, 1826
- Preceded by: Almon Ruggles
- Succeeded by: David Campbell

Personal details
- Born: December 25, 1787 Granville, New York
- Died: December 27, 1864 (aged 77) Sandusky, Ohio, U.S.
- Party: Anti Jacksonian
- Spouse: Martha Carswell
- Children: Jay Cooke; Henry D. Cooke
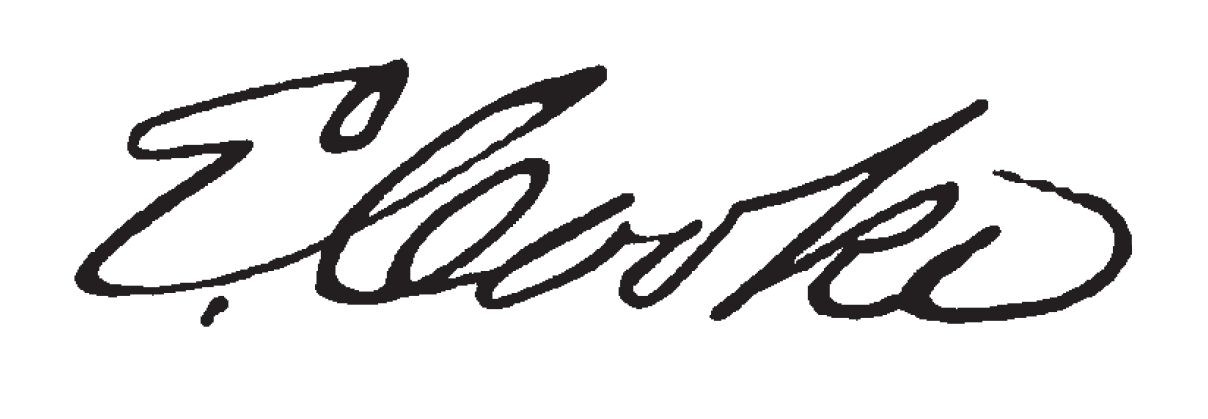
- Signature

Eleutheros Cooke (December 25, 1787 – December 27, 1864) was a lawyer and U.S. representative from Ohio (1831–1833).

== Biography ==
Cooke was born in Granville, Washington County, New York. He was the son of Asaph Cooke (1748-1826) and Thankful Parker (1745-1819). His grandfather was Asaph Cooke (1720-1792). His first name commemorates the framing of the United States Constitution in 1787, the year of his birth. He was educated at Union College in Schenectady. He studied law, was admitted to the bar, and began a law practice in Granville. He later moved to Madison, Indiana in 1817 and to Sandusky, Ohio in 1819. He was elected to the Ohio House of Representatives in 1822, 1823, and 1825 and 1840. He obtained from the Ohio Legislature in 1826 the first charter granted to a railroad in the United States — the Mad River and Lake Erie Railroad (later the Sandusky, Dayton and Cincinnati Railroad) — and ground was broken for it in 1832.

He was elected to represent Ohio's 14th congressional district in the 22nd United States Congress in 1831 as an anti-Jacksonian candidate. He was not reelected to this office, notwithstanding his receipt of a majority of votes.

While he was in Congress, fellow Ohio Representative William Stanbery was assaulted on the street by General Sam Houston, in consequence of remarks made on the floor of the House. In bringing the matter before Congress, Cooke said that if he and his friends were denied protection by that body, he would "flee to the bosom of his constituents," and this expression was taken up by his political opponents and remained a catch word for some time.

== Family ==
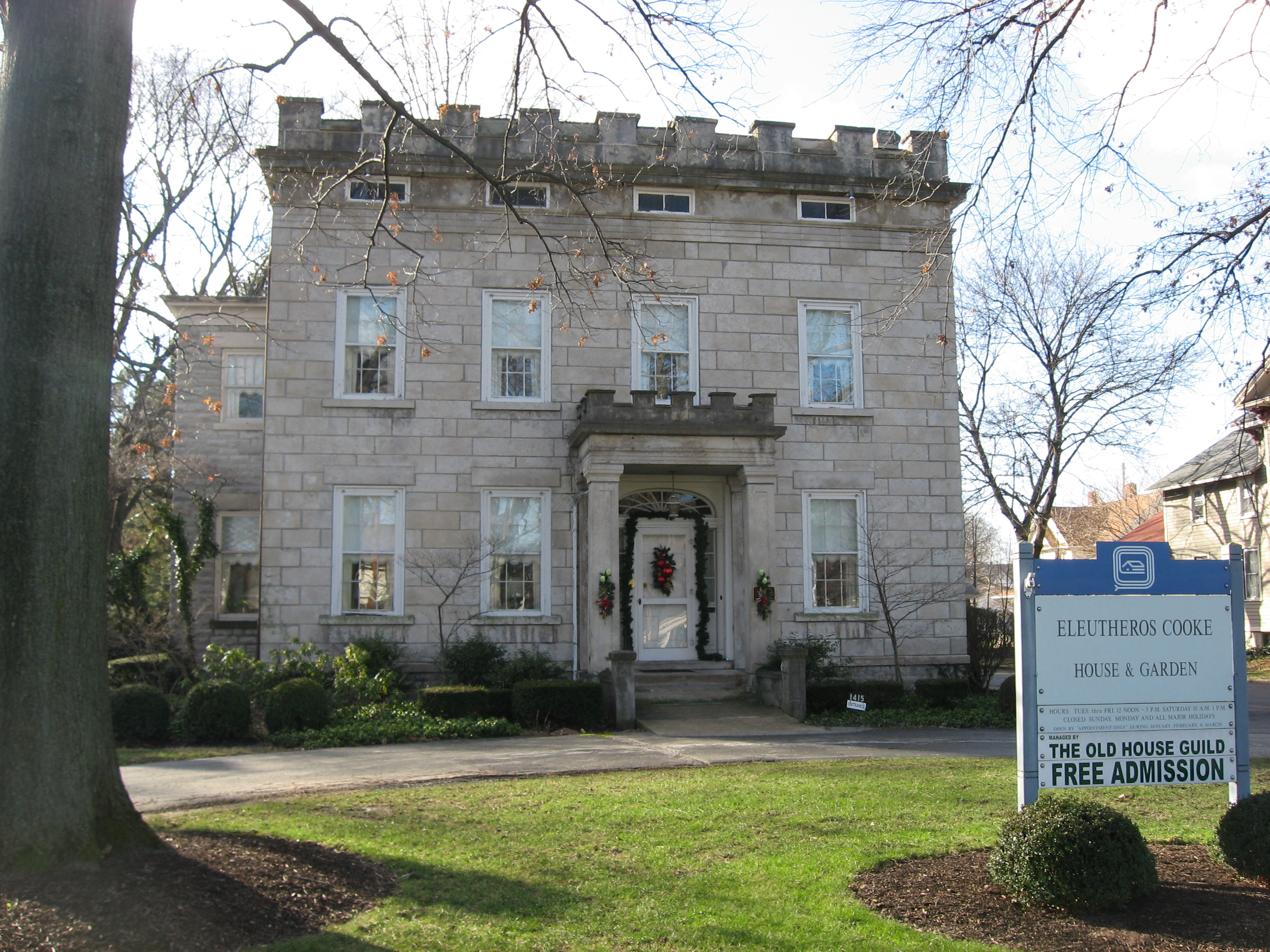
Cooke's home in Sandusky

His son Jay Cooke was a prominent railroad financier. Another son, Henry D. Cooke, was a noted financier and journalist.

== See also ==
- Eleutheros Cooke House (410 Columbus Avenue, Sandusky, Ohio)
- Eleutheros Cooke House (1415 Columbus Avenue, Sandusky, Ohio)

== Notes ==
Attribution

U.S. House of Representatives
Preceded by Mordecai Bartley	Member of the U.S. House of Representatives from Ohio's 14th congressional district 1831-1833	Succeeded by William Patterson
