= Hotel Breakers =

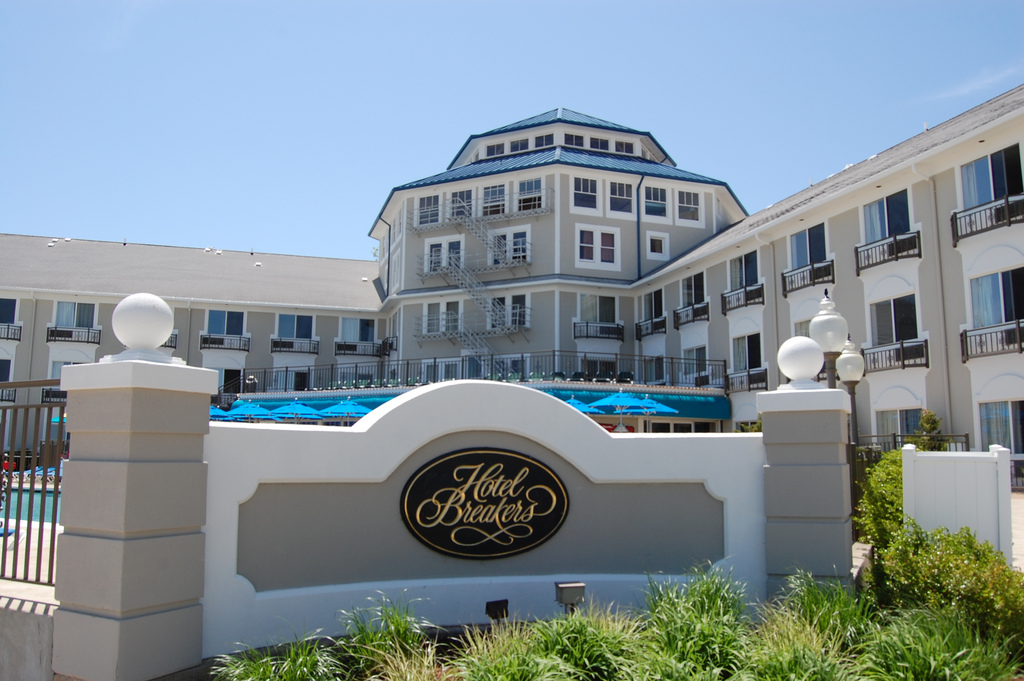
- Hotel Breakers in 2009
- Interactive map of the Hotel Breakers area
- Hotel chain: Cedar Point Resorts

General information
- Location: 1 Cedar Point Drive, Sandusky, Ohio, US
- Coordinates: 41°29′05″N 82°41′00″W
- Opened: June 12, 1905
- Owner: Six Flags Entertainment Corporation

Technical details
- Floor count: 10

Other information
- Number of rooms: 669
- Number of restaurants: 4

Website
- sixflags.com/cedarpoint/resorts/hotel-breakers
- Hotel Breakers
- Formerly listed on the U.S. National Register of Historic Places
- Former U.S. National Historic Landmark
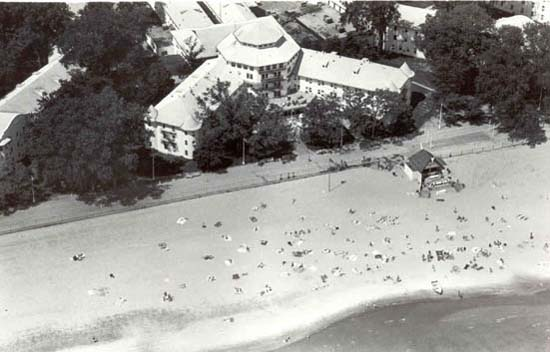
- Aerial view of Hotel Breakers with the rotunda at the center, 1985

- Location within Ohio
- Location: Cedar Point, Sandusky, Ohio, United States
- Built: 1905
- Architect: Knox & Elliott
- Architectural style: Late 19th and 20th century revivals, French chateau
- NRHP reference No.: 82003565

Significant dates
- Added to NRHP: 1982
- Designated NHL: March 9, 1987
- Removed from NRHP: August 7, 2001
- Delisted NHL: August 7, 2001

Hotel Breakers is a historic resort-hotel located in Sandusky, Ohio, United States. Opened on June 12, 1905, the hotel is owned by the Six Flags Entertainment Corporation and located inside of the Cedar Point amusement park, near Lake Erie. It was formerly listed on the United States National Register of Historic Places and was a National Historic Landmark before being delisted from both in 2001.

== History ==
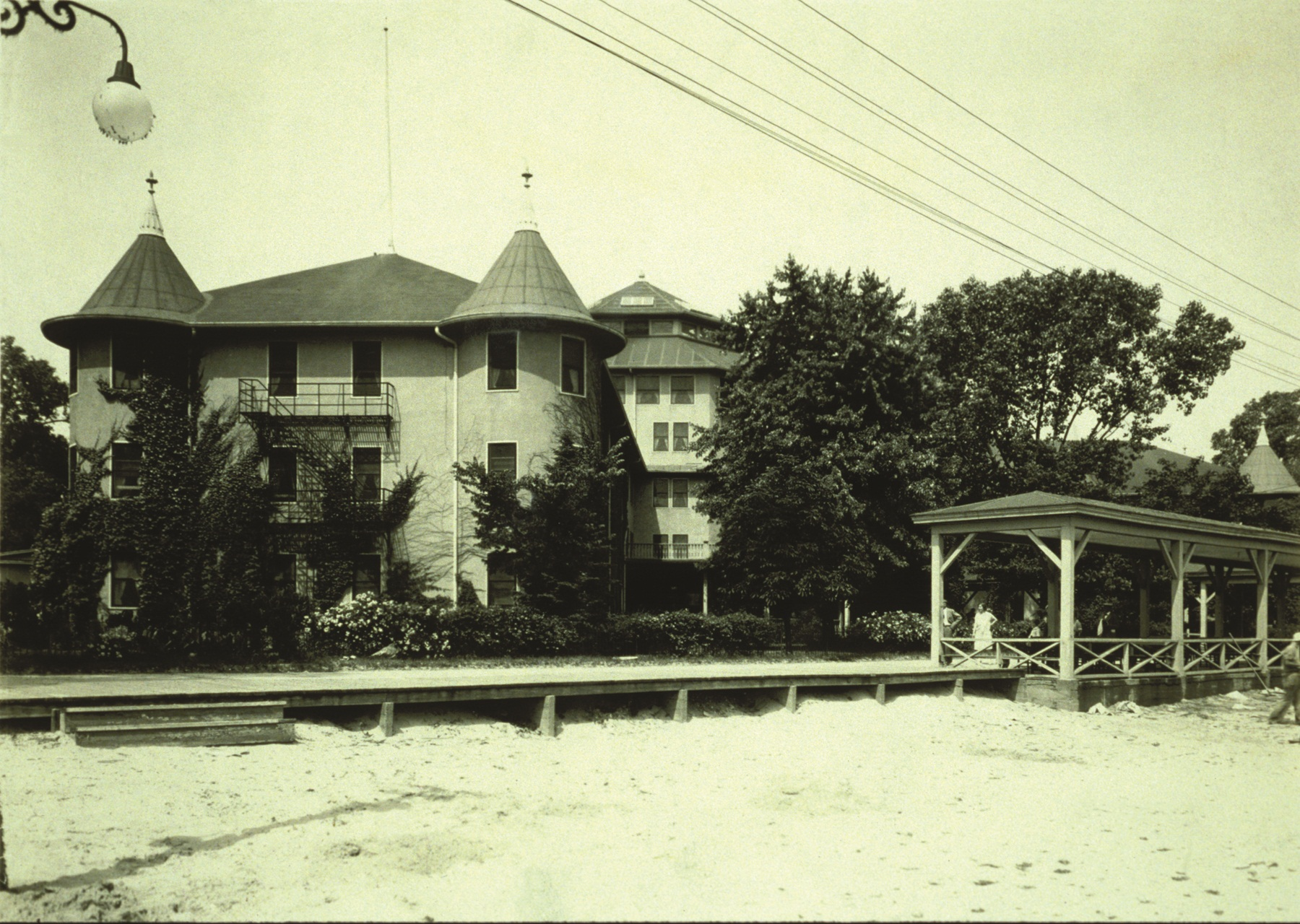
Hotel Breakers in 1905

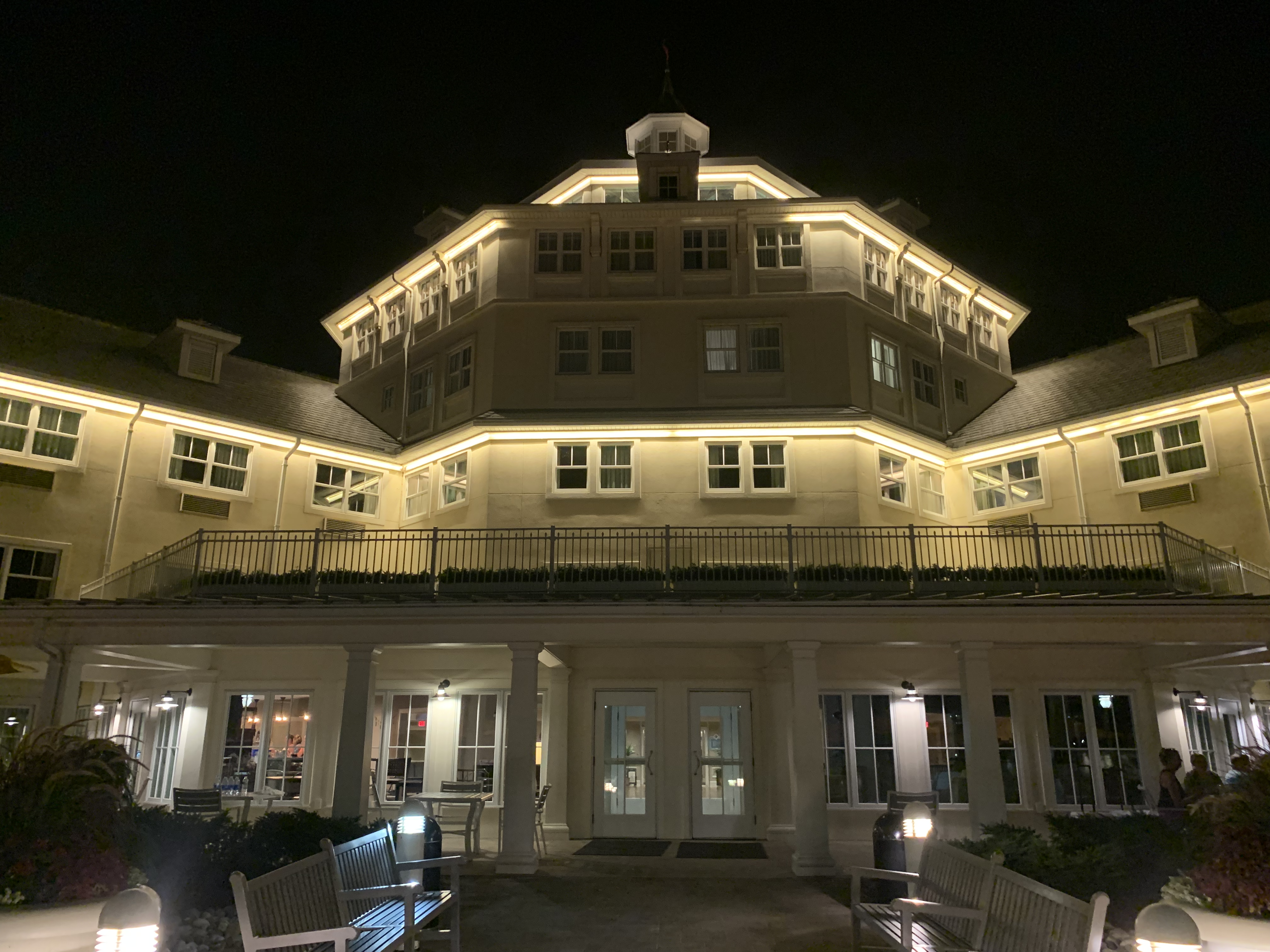
Hotel Breakers at night in 2022

=== Early years ===
At the turn of the 20th Century, George A. Boeckling, then general manager of Cedar Point, believed that the longer guests stayed at Cedar Point, the more profitable the resort would be. The park's two hotels at that time, the 20-room Bay Shore Hotel and the 125-room White House Hotel, were having trouble meeting the demands of overnight visitors. Boeckling made plans to build a massive hotel on the resort's beach. Keeping with Boeckling's vision of Cedar Point as the "Queen of American Watering Places", he set out to build the resort's grandest hotel.

The Hotel Breakers opened on June 12, 1905, featuring 600 rooms, most with a view of Lake Erie. Each room included running water and one hundred had private baths, a rarity for hotels at that time. The hotel's Breakers Cafe seated 400 guests. The hotel was designed by the Knox & Elliott architectural firm and was influenced by chateaus Boeckling had seen while traveling in France.

The hotel's lobby featured round seats, which remain a Cedar Point tradition. The ceiling was elaborate pressed tin and included chandeliers crafted by Tiffany artists. The hotel's original amenities included imported wicker furniture, large brass beds, a manicurist, a medical doctor, a tailor, a stenographer, a barbershop, news stand, ice cream parlor and souvenir counter. Adjacent to the lobby was a four-story rotunda featuring four tiers of balconies, which remains in the hotel.

=== Heyday ===
A new wing was added to the Breakers in 1917 bringing the number of rooms to more than 700. Singers from the Metropolitan Opera gave impromptu performances in the rotunda from their balconies during the 1910s and 1920s. The 160-room Bon Air wing of the hotel was added to the north side in 1926, bringing the number of rooms to 875.

In 1935, the Hotel Breakers was modernized and the Tavern Terrace added near the hotel. The outdoor stage area provided entertainment and served cocktails.

=== Later years ===
In 1995, the hotel constructed the Breakers East wing on a five-acre site just east of the lobby. The US$10,000,000 (equivalent to $21,129,067 in 2025) project added 206 rooms, including 103 regular rooms, 95 suites and eight tower suites. The new wing also contained three meeting rooms and an outdoor pool and spa.

In 1999, the 10-story Breakers Tower wing was constructed on the hotel's west side, with a five-story connecting link to the main building. The Breakers Tower added a total of 230 rooms and suites, including 17 luxury suites with private balconies. Several historic wings of the hotel were demolished during the 1999 project, altering the hotel significantly.

In the off-season after summer 2014, another major renovation project began. This involved the demolition of one of the remaining historic sections of the hotel, the original main lobby, as well as the demolition of the 1926 Bon Air wing. The renovations also included the restoration and reopening of the remaining historic central rotunda wing, which had been mothballed for years, because the old guest rooms in it did not have bathrooms. In addition, the 2014 renovations involved repainting the hotel, replacing its roof, and remodeling the interior. Contemporary reports described the work as part of a two-year renovation that called for a new entrance, remodeled rooms, new furnishings and an outdoor water-play area. The renovations were the most expensive single project ever at Cedar Point. The hotel reopened for the 2015 season.

In 2018, a new 158-room, 6-story tower, the Breakers West, was opened on the site of the demolished Bon Air wing. It included connecting rooms for families, as well as its own outdoor pool and jacuzzi.

== Notable people ==
Over the years notable guests have included:

- Abbott and Costello
- Calvin Coolidge
- Dwight D. Eisenhower
- Warren G. Harding
- Helen Keller
- Annie Oakley
- John D. Rockefeller
- Theodore Roosevelt
- John Philip Sousa
- William Howard Taft
- Woodrow Wilson

== National Register of Historic Places ==
The hotel was designated a U.S. National Historic Landmark in 1987.

As a direct result of the 1999 demolitions, the hotel's National Historic Landmark status was removed on August 7, 2001. The National Park Service stated the hotel "no longer retained integrity of scale, massing, and materials." In addition, they said the new Breakers Tower disrupted "the spatial and visual relationship between the original rotunda and wings."

== Features ==
The hotel sits on the one mile beach mentioned on Cedar Point's web page. There are 511 rooms and suites with a small portion with a Peanuts comic theme. The hotel has two outdoor pools and one indoor pool, each with a hot tub nearby. The hotel contains a conference center, shops including Tommy Bahama, and several restaurants including T.G.I. Friday's and Perkins Restaurant.

The 2014-2015 remodel replaced the dinner restaurant with a Japanese teppanyaki and sushi restaurant, a new lobby bar, an in house Starbucks, a dedicated Dominos pizza delivery kitchen, as well as a new beach bar.

== Gallery ==
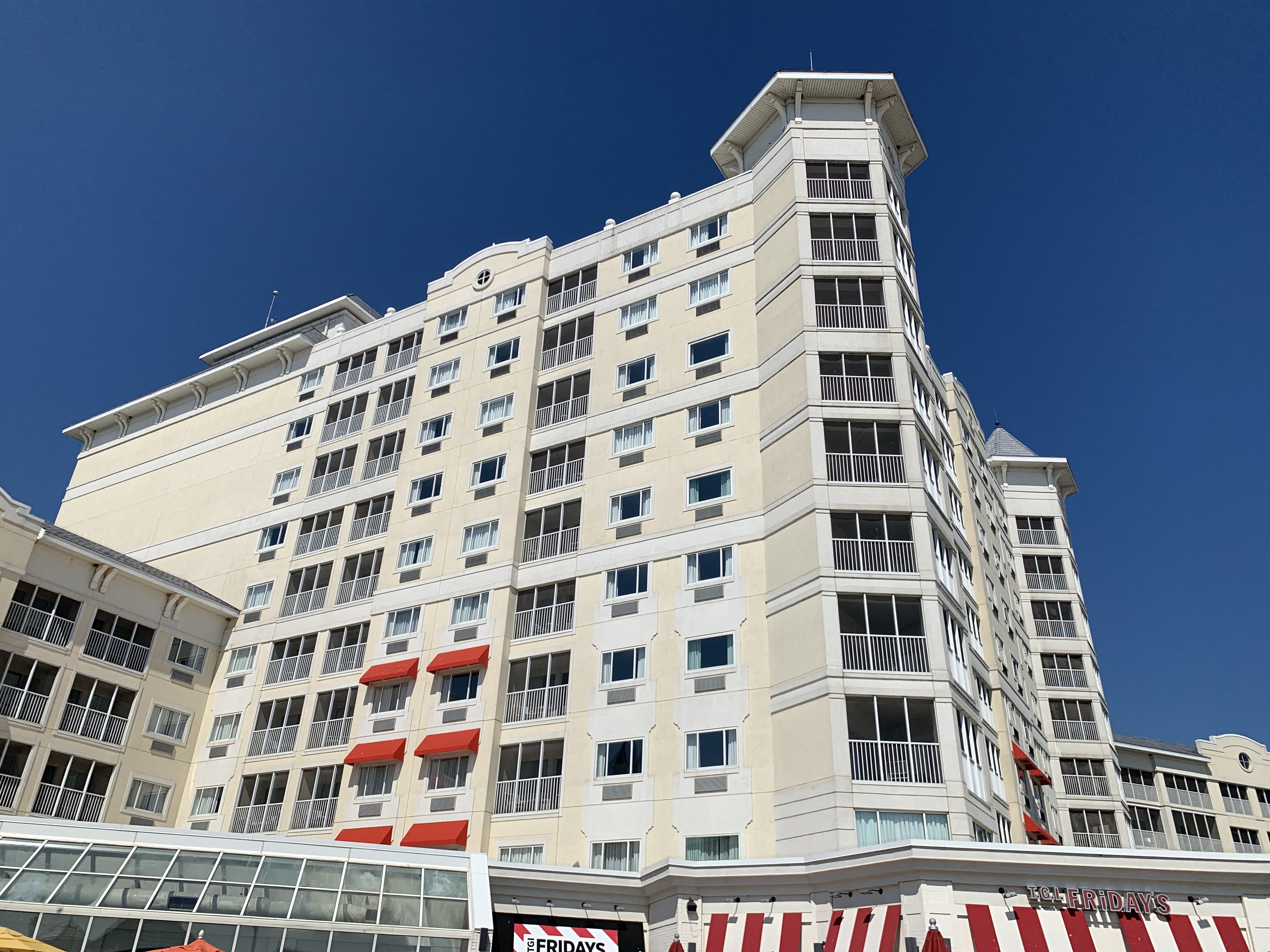
View of Hotel Breakers Tower in July 2022

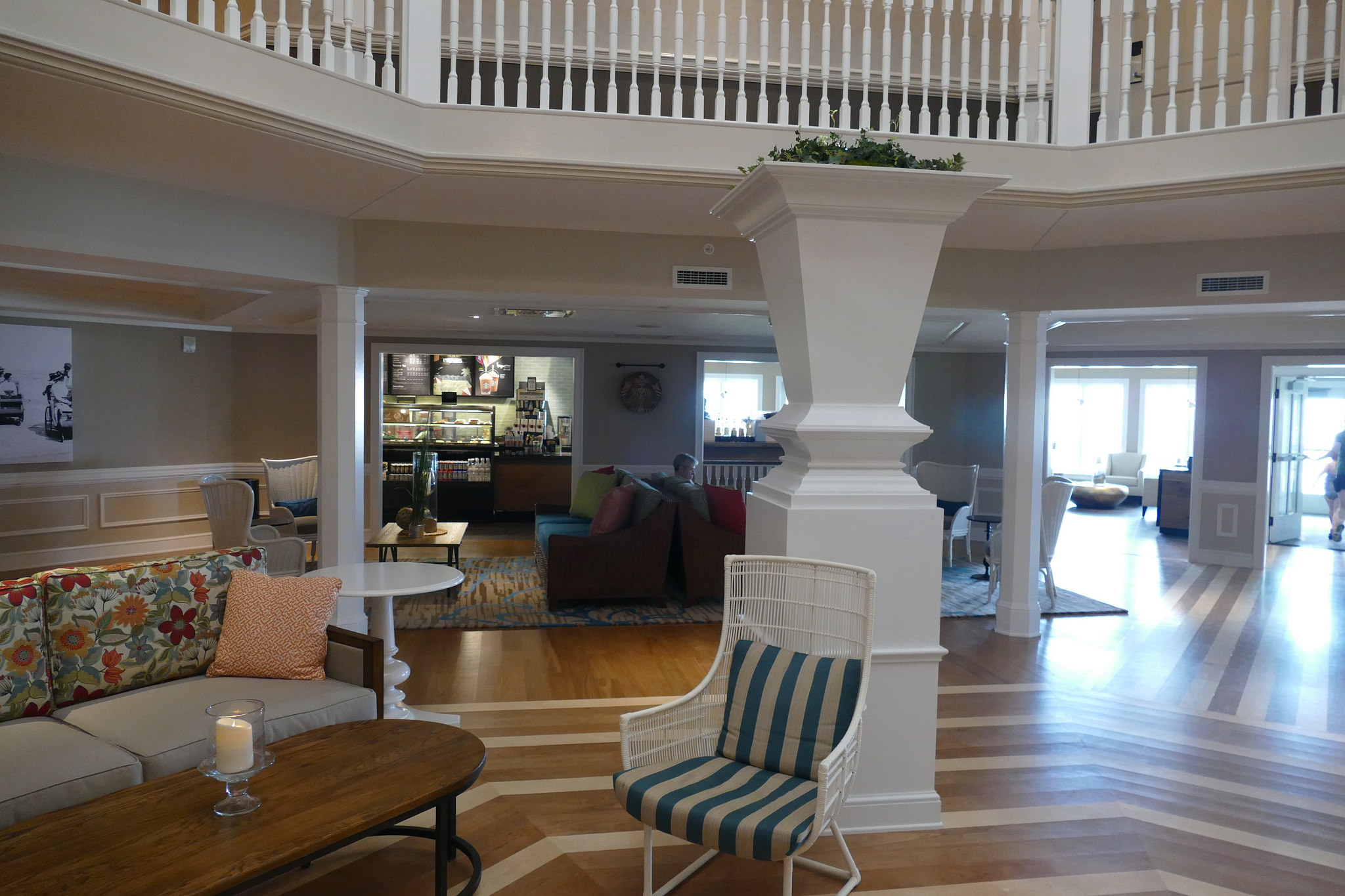
Hotel Breakers Cedar Point Facing Beach Windows from Rotunda after 2014 Remodel

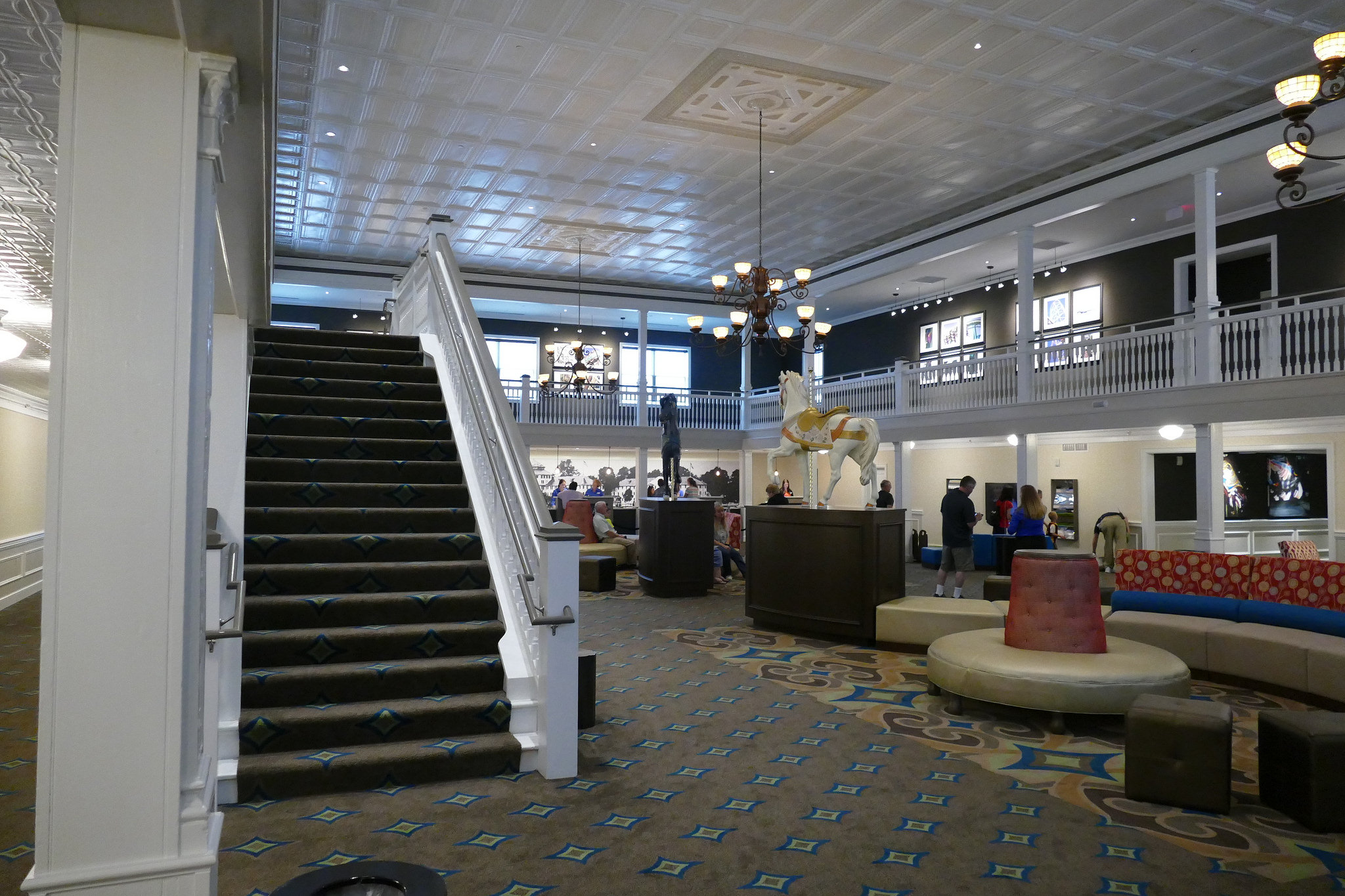
Hotel Breakers Lobby Area after 2014 Remodel

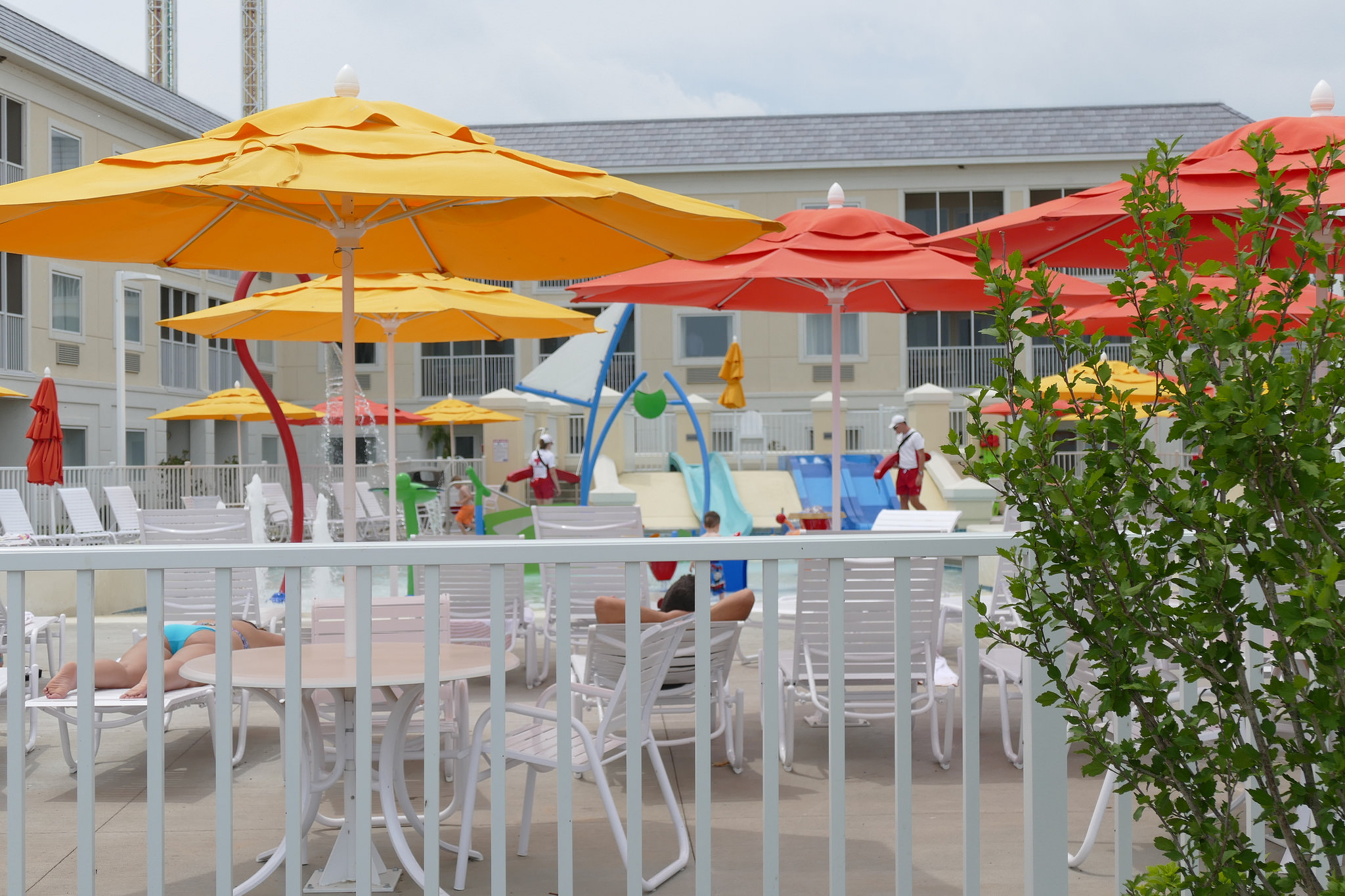
Hotel Breakers Cedar Point Beach Area after 2014 Remodel

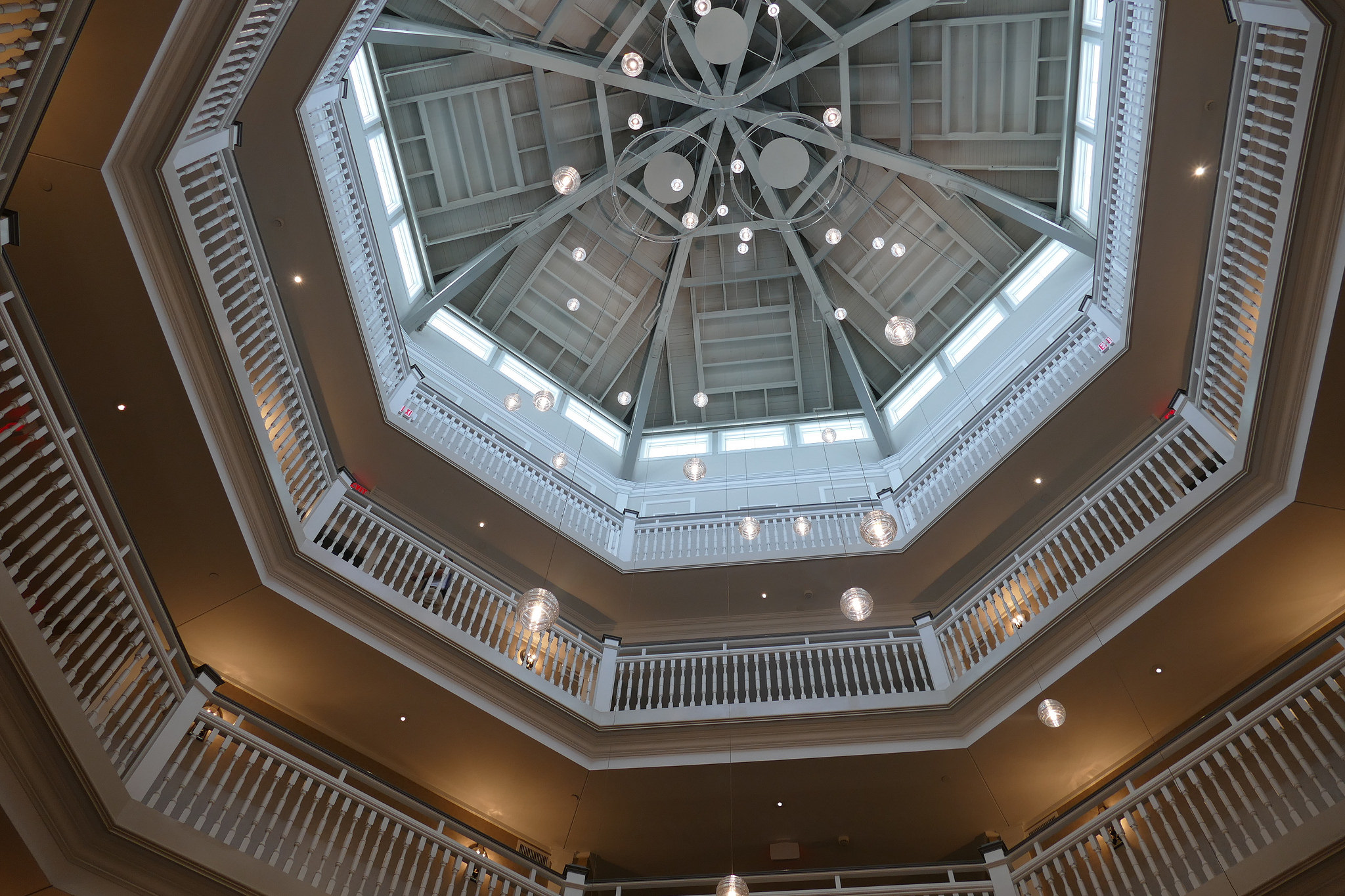
Hotel Breakers Cedar Point Rotunda After 2014 Remodel
