= August Kuebeler House =

- U.S. National Register of Historic Places
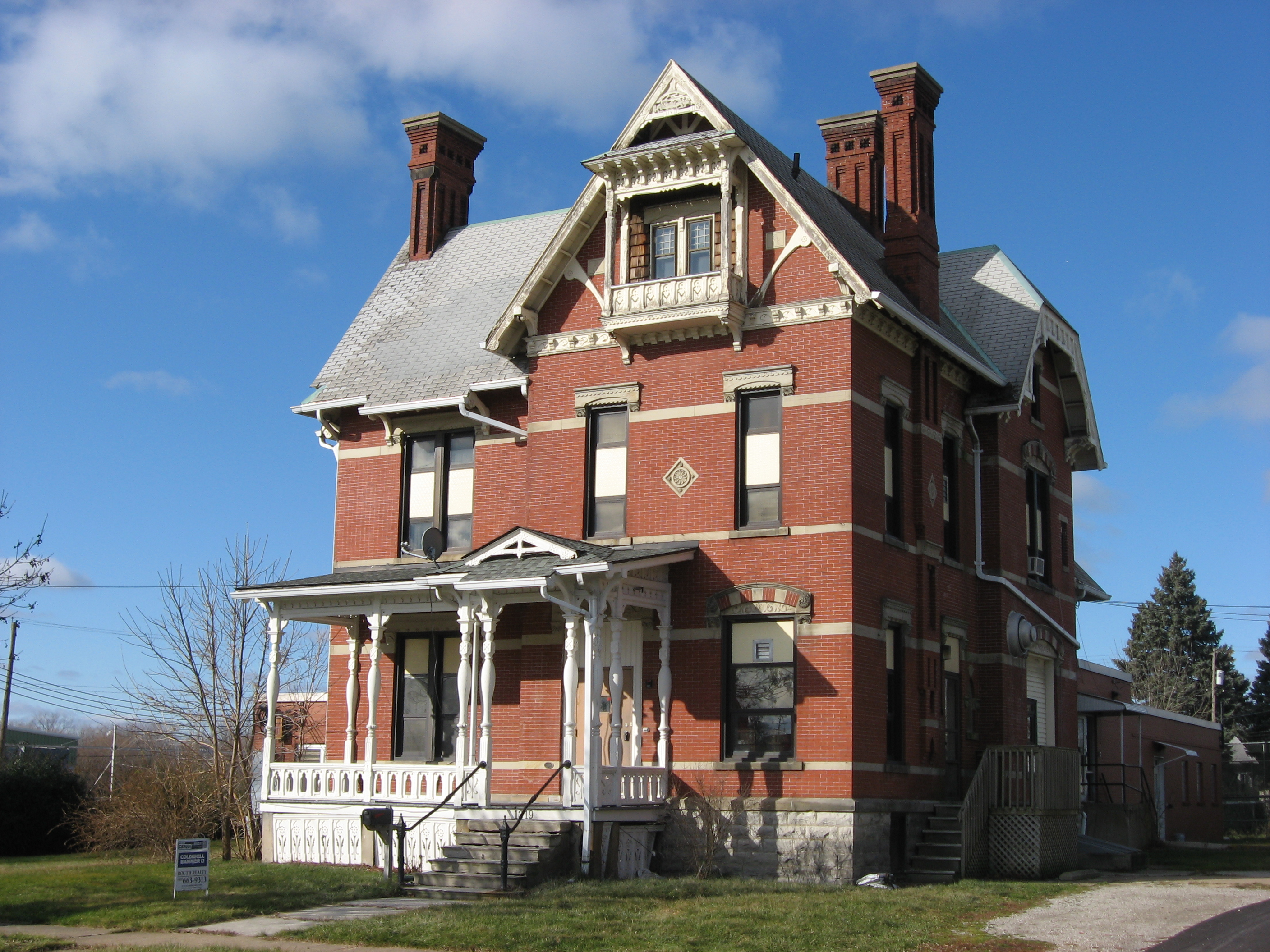
- Location: 1319 Tiffan Avenue, Sandusky, Erie County, Ohio, United States
- Coordinates: 41.444444°N 82.729444°W
- Built: 1885
- Architectural style: Stick/Eastlake
- Part of: Sandusky MRA
- NRHP reference No.: 82001416
- Added to NRHP: October 20, 1982

August Kuebeler House is a historic residence in Sandusky, Ohio. It has been listed on the National Register of Historic Places since 1982. The home is privately owned and not open to the public.

== History ==
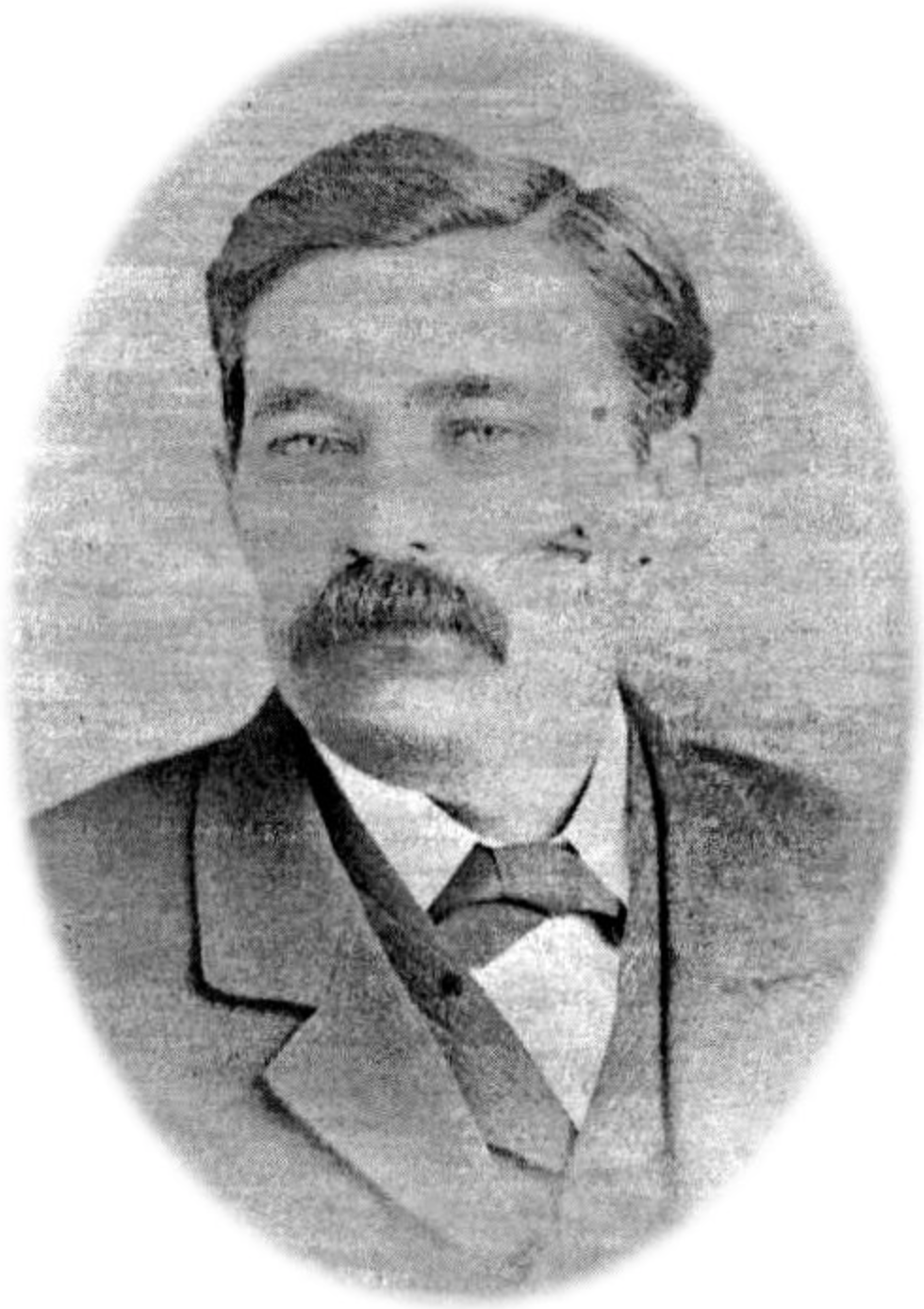
August Kuebeler

The three story house was built in 1885, in a Stick/Eastlake style. It is located at 1319 Tiffin Avenue in Sandusky, Ohio.

The house was built for August Kuebeler (1843–1927), a German-born beer businessman, who helped establish and was a proprietor of the Kuebeler Brewery (1867–1929; which once stood nearby on Tiffan Ave. in Sandusky). His older brother Jacob Kuebeler (1838–1909) had an almost identical home built across the street at 1318 Tiffin Avenue, which no longer stands.

== See also ==
- National Register of Historic Places listings in Erie County, Ohio
- National Register of Historic Places listings in Sandusky, Ohio
