= Eleutheros Cooke House (1415 Columbus Avenue, Sandusky, Ohio) =

Historic house in Ohio, United States

- U.S. National Register of Historic Places
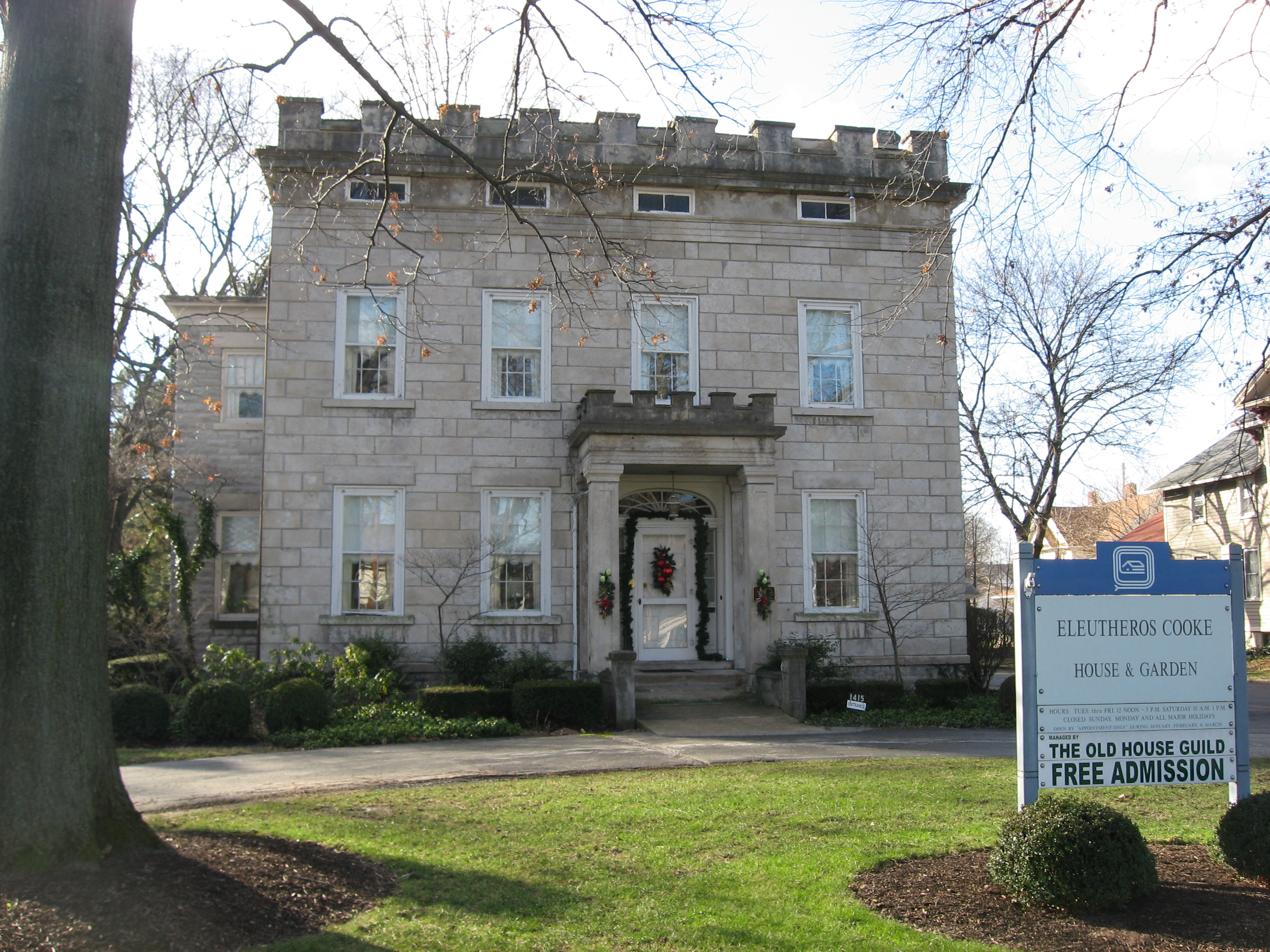
- Front of the house

- Location within Ohio Location within the United States
- Location: 1415 Columbus Ave., Sandusky, Ohio
- Coordinates: 41°26′38″N 82°42′18″W
- Built: 1844
- Architectural style: Greek Revival
- MPS: Sandusky MRA
- NRHP reference No.: 82001389
- Added to NRHP: October 20, 1982

The Eleutheros Cooke House, also known as the Cooke-Dorn House, at 1415 Columbus Avenue in Sandusky, Ohio is a three-story, limestone Greek Revival style house that was built in 1844. It was the last home of Eleutheros Cooke, one of the first settlers in Sandusky and its first lawyer. Eleutheros was father of Jay Cooke, the Civil War financier.

It was listed on the National Register of Historic Places in 1982.

The house is owned by the Ohio History Connection and is open seasonally as a historic house museum that has been restored to a 1950s appearance. It is managed locally by the Old House Guild of Sandusky.

== See also ==
- Eleutheros Cooke House (410 Columbus Avenue, Sandusky, Ohio), also built by Eleutheros Cooke, on the same street
- National Register of Historic Places listings in Sandusky, Ohio
