= Eleutheros Cooke House (410 Columbus Avenue, Sandusky, Ohio) =

Historic house in Ohio, United States

- U.S. National Register of Historic Places
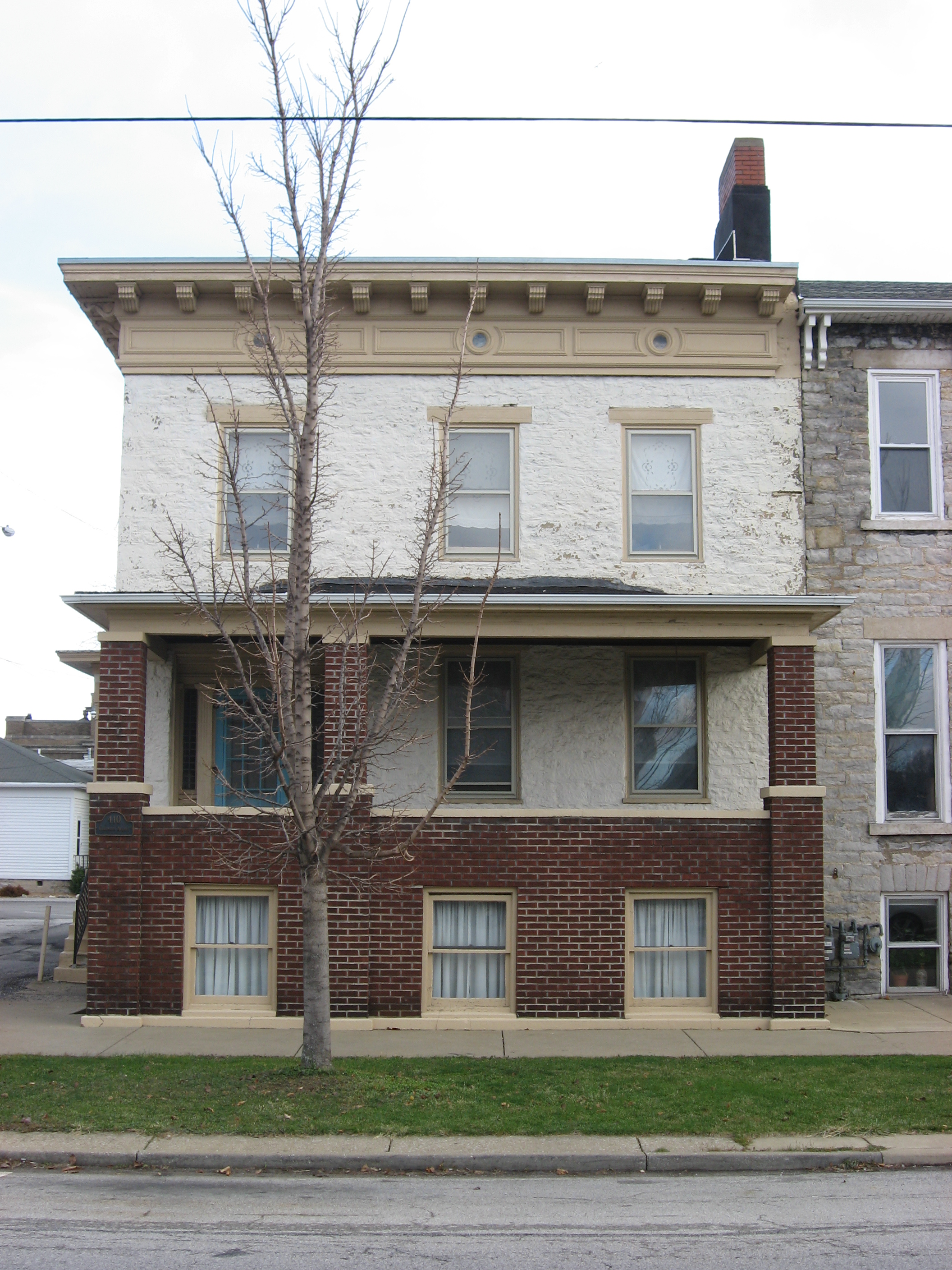
- Front of the house

- Location within Ohio Location within the United States
- Location: 410 Columbus Ave., Sandusky, Ohio
- Coordinates: 41°27′12″N 82°42′36″W
- Built: 1827
- Architectural style: Greek Revival
- MPS: Sandusky MRA
- NRHP reference No.: 82001390
- Added to NRHP: October 20, 1982

The Eleutheros Cooke House at 410 Columbus Avenue in Sandusky, Ohio is the oldest surviving house in Sandusky. It is a Greek Revival style house that was built in 1827 by Eleutheros Cooke, one of the first settlers in the area and its first lawyer. The original front porch of the house saw General William Henry Harrison receive a flag from the women of Sandusky, in 1835.

It was listed on the National Register of Historic Places in 1982.

== See also ==
- Eleutheros Cooke House (1415 Columbus Avenue, Sandusky, Ohio), also built by Eleutheros Cooke, on the same street
- National Register of Historic Places listings in Sandusky, Ohio
