= Engine House No. 1 (Sandusky, Ohio) =

- U.S. National Register of Historic Places
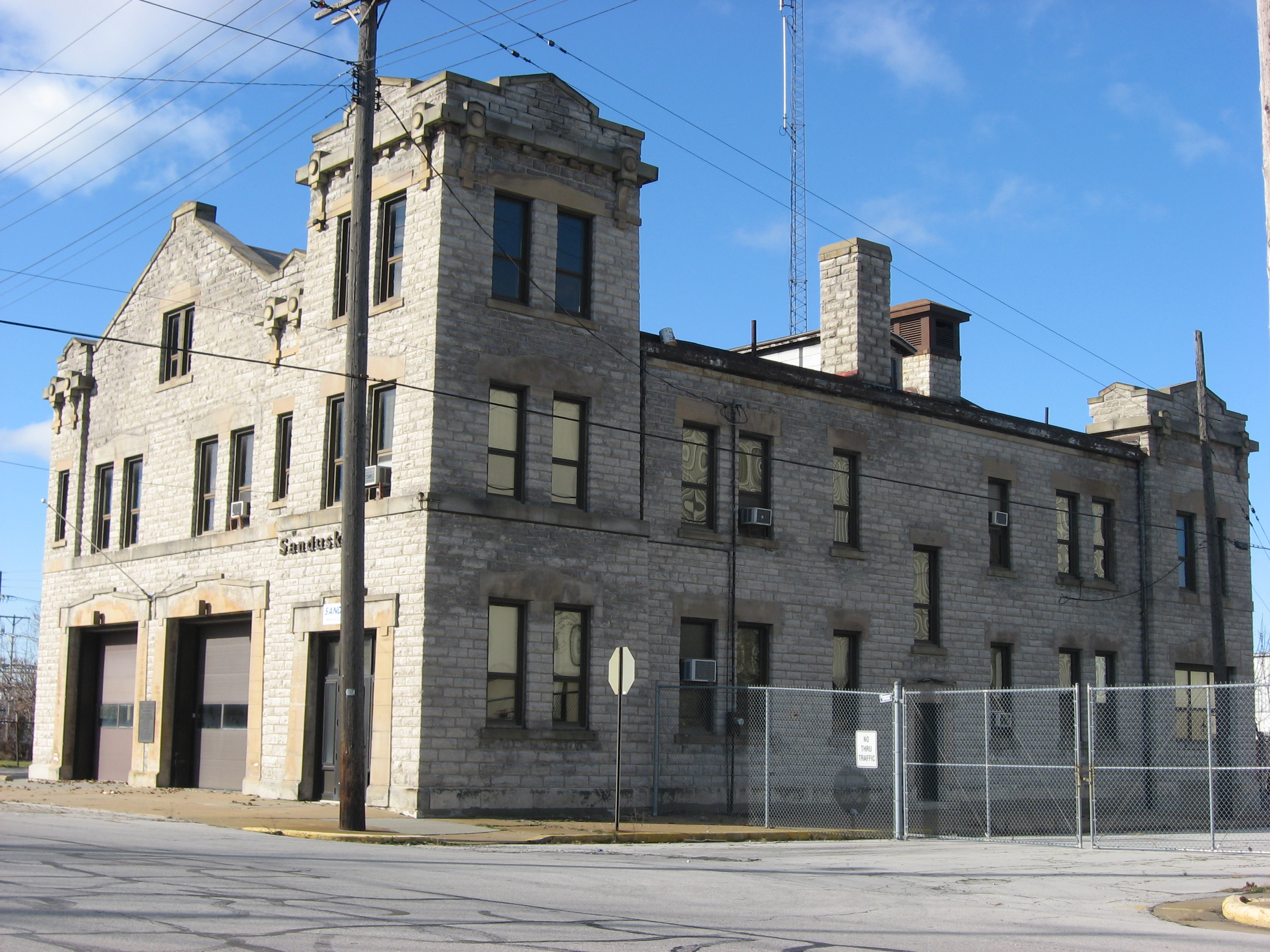

- Location within Ohio
- Location: 901 W. Market St., Sandusky, Ohio
- Coordinates: 41°27′14″N 82°43′10″W
- Area: less than one acre
- Built: 1915
- Built by: C.N. Biehl
- Architectural style: Late 19th and 20th Century Revivals
- MPS: Sandusky MRA
- NRHP reference No.: 82001394
- Added to NRHP: October 20, 1982

The Engine House No. 1 in Sandusky, Ohio was built in 1915. It was listed on the National Register of Historic Places in 1982.

It is a two-and-a-half-story limestone building. It has two square towers, at its northeast and southeast corners.

It is Greco-Egyptian-Functional in style.

== See also ==
- National Register of Historic Places listings in Erie County, Ohio
- Engine House No. 3 (Sandusky, Ohio)
- No. 5 Fire Station (Sandusky, Ohio)
