= No. 5 Fire Station (Sandusky, Ohio) =

- U.S. National Register of Historic Places
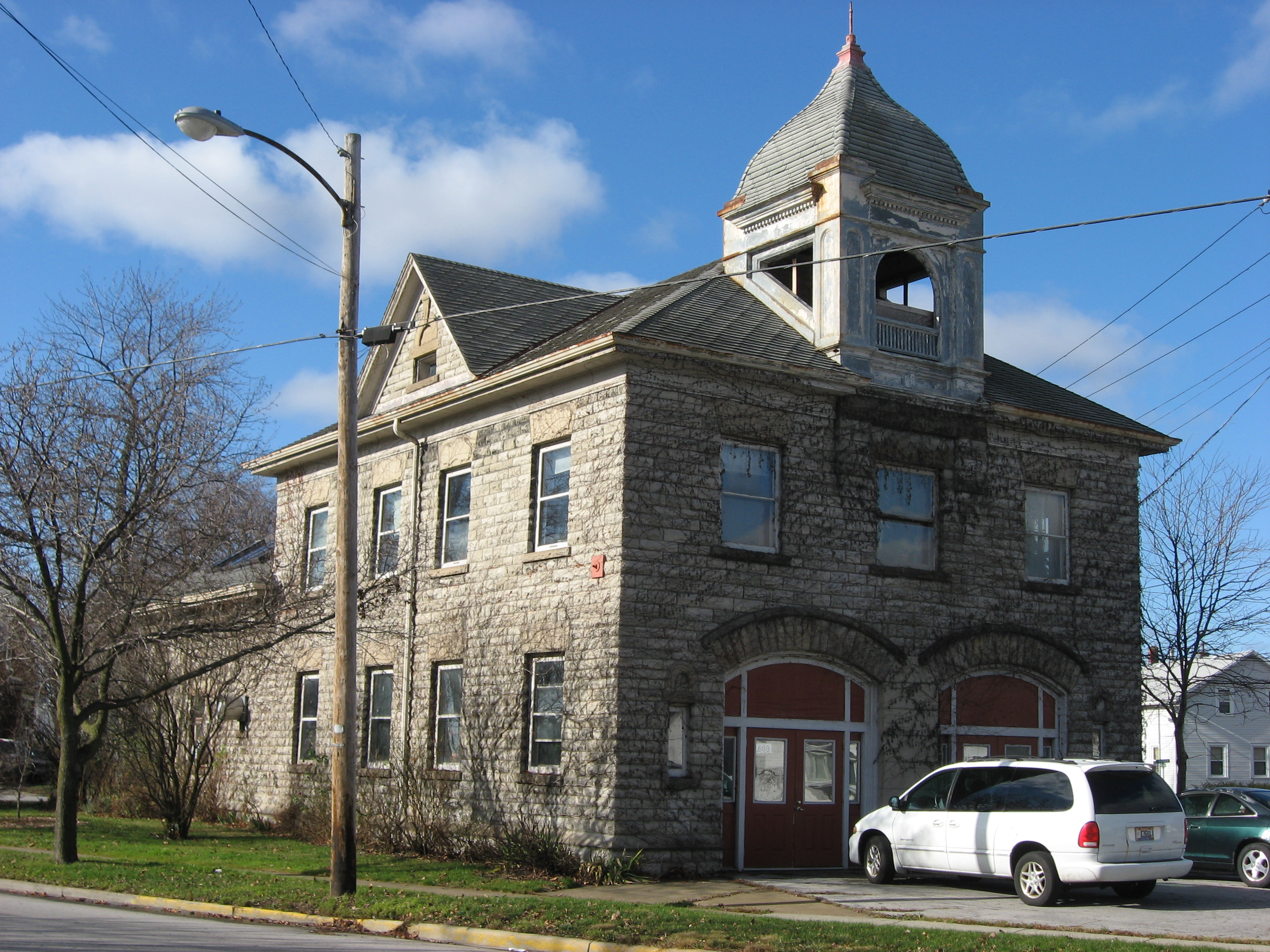

- Location within Ohio
- Location: W. Madison and Tiffin Ave., Sandusky, Ohio
- Coordinates: 41°26′51″N 82°43′33″W
- Area: less than one acre (0.40 ha)
- Built: 1906; 120 years ago
- Built by: Shively & Son
- MPS: Sandusky MRA
- NRHP reference No.: 82001428
- Added to NRHP: October 20, 1982

No. 5 Fire Station in Sandusky, Ohio, was built in 1906. It was listed on the National Register of Historic Places in 1982.

It was one of four fire stations built of cut limestone in Sandusky which held horse-drawn equipment. It is a two-story building with a hipped gable roof.

== See also ==
- National Register of Historic Places listings in Erie County, Ohio
- Engine House No. 1 (Sandusky, Ohio)
- Engine House No. 3 (Sandusky, Ohio)
