= Hinde & Dauch Paper Company =

The Hinde & Dauch Paper Company was an international paper-making company that was based in Sandusky, Ohio, United States. The firm was founded as Sandusky Paper Company by W. J. Bonn in 1880.

Two developers of a hay-baling process, James J. Hinde and Jacob J. Dauch, later purchased the company. It was ultimately acquired by the West Virginia Pulp and Paper Company.

A 2009 story in the Sandusky Register recalled the days of a century before, when the company employed 350 workers in the city. Local residents clearly remembered the scent of the company; to quote Erie County Historical Society president Janet Senne, "It smelled up the whole town. It made you sick to your stomach in the 1940s". In the previous two decades, Hinde and Dauch had been the city's largest employer.

Three of the company's buildings are separately listed on the National Register of Historic Places.

== 409 West Water Street ==
- Hinde & Dauch Paper Co.
- U.S. National Register of Historic Places
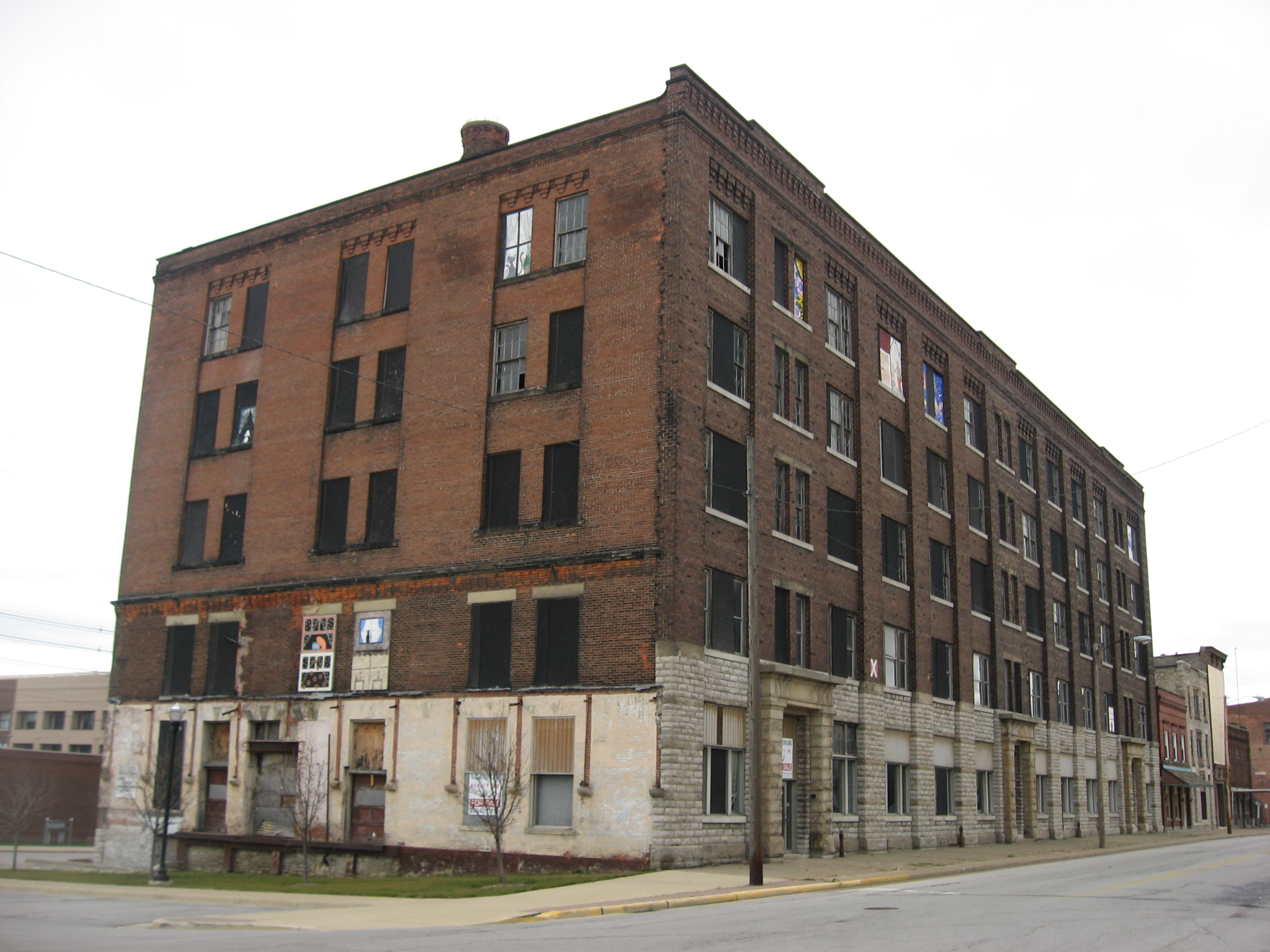

- Location within Ohio Location within the United States
- Location: 409 W. Water St., Sandusky, Ohio
- Coordinates: 41°27′22″N 82°42′55″W
- Built: 1906
- MPS: Sandusky MRA
- NRHP reference No.: 82001406
- Added to NRHP: October 20, 1982

The 409 West Water Street facility was built in 1906. It was torn down between 2013 and 2014 as it was a blight. 41°27′22″N 82°42′55″W

== 401 West Shoreline Drive ==
- Hinde & Dauch Paper Co.
- U.S. National Register of Historic Places
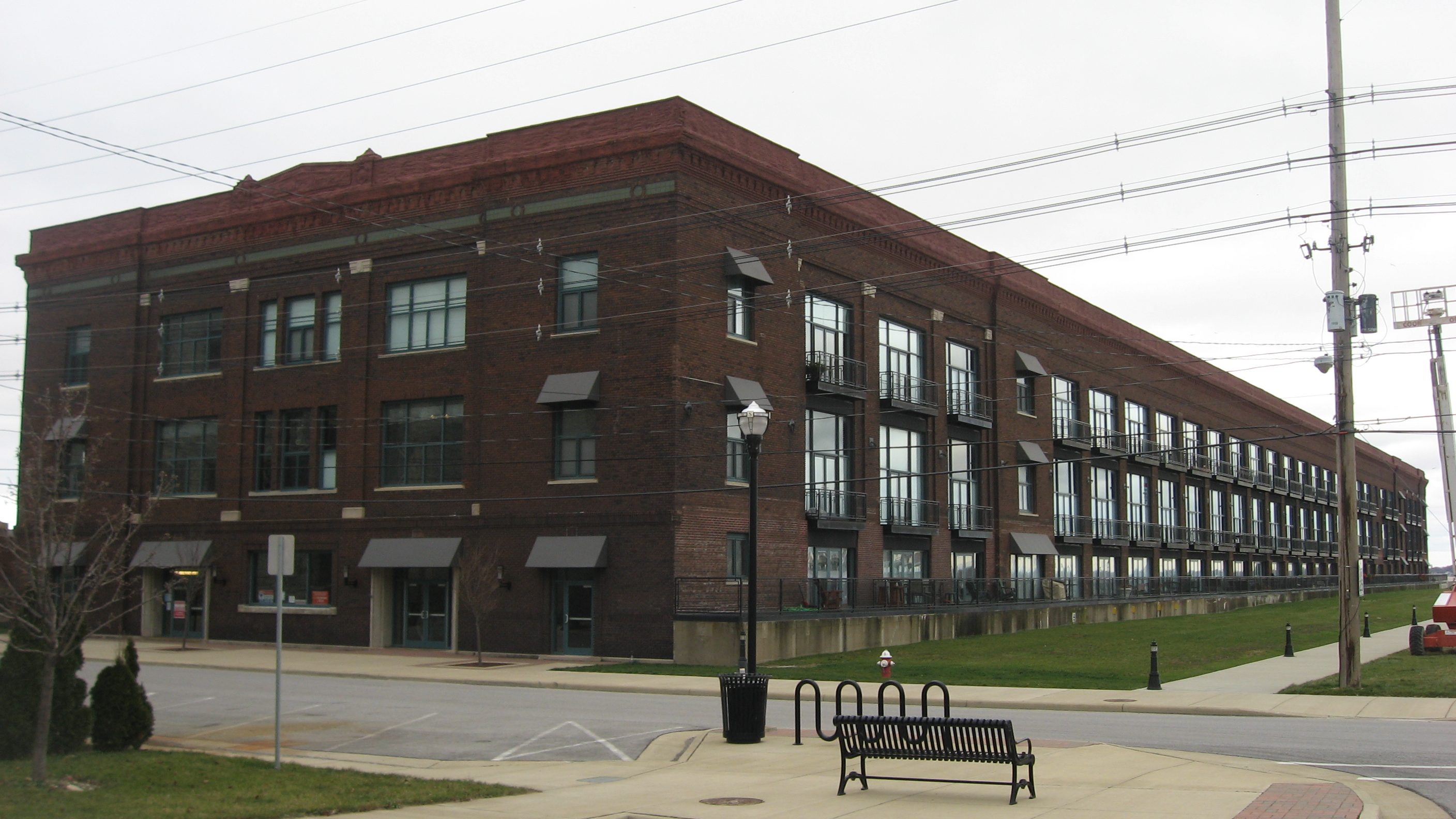

- Location within Ohio Location within the United States
- Location: 401 W. Shoreline Dr., Sandusky, Ohio
- Coordinates: 41°27′28″N 82°42′55″W
- Built: 1918
- Architectural style: Late 19th And Early 20th Century American Movements
- MPS: Sandusky MRA
- NRHP reference No.: 82001407
- Added to NRHP: October 20, 1982

The 401 West Shoreline Drive facility, on Sandusky Bay, was built in 1918. 41°27′28″N 82°42′55″W

The building is very large, and most likely the Hinde & Dauch factory building, now occupied by Chesapeake Lofts, was a condo development.

== 407 Decatur Street ==
- Hinde & Dauch Paper Co.
- U.S. National Register of Historic Places
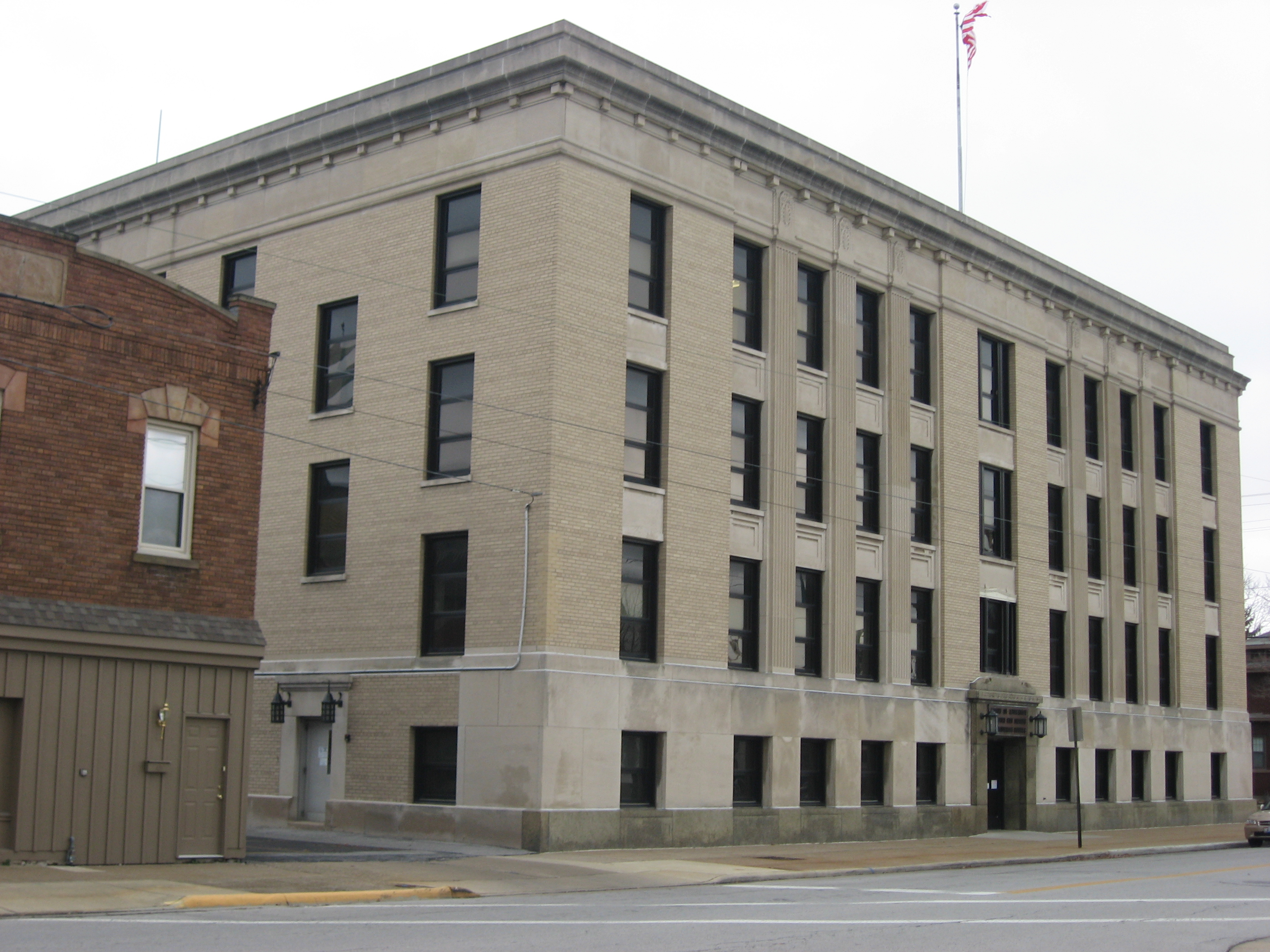

- Location within Ohio Location within the United States
- Location: 407 Decatur St., Sandusky, Ohio
- Coordinates: 41°27′8″N 82°42′48″W
- Built: 1926
- Architectural style: Neo-Classical
- MPS: Sandusky MRA
- NRHP reference No.: 82001408
- Added to NRHP: October 20, 1982

The 407 Decatur Street facility was built in 1926, 26 years after the 409 building was built. Now occupied by the Sandusky City Schools offices. 41°27′8″N 82°42′48″W
