= Emmanuel United Church of Christ =

Historic church in Ohio, United States

- Emmanuel Church
- U.S. National Register of Historic Places
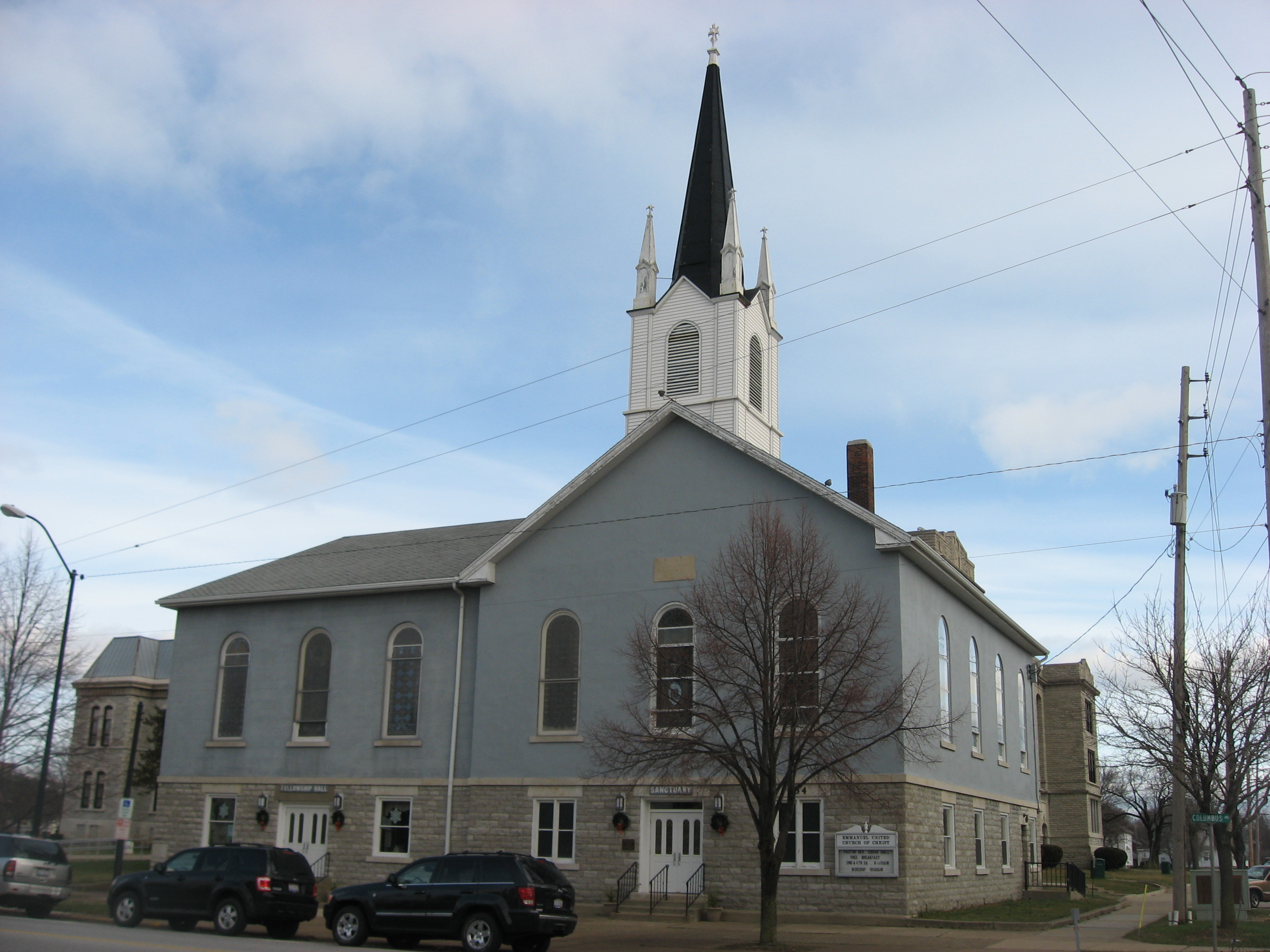

- Location within Ohio Location within the United States
- Location: 334 Columbus Ave., Sandusky, Ohio
- Coordinates: 41°27′14″N 82°42′37″W
- Area: less than one acre
- Built: 1866
- MPS: Sandusky MRA
- NRHP reference No.: 82001392
- Added to NRHP: October 20, 1982

Emmanuel Church is a historic church at 334 Columbus Avenue in Sandusky, Ohio.

It was built in 1866 and added to the National Register in 1982.
