= George Arthur Boeckling =

German businessman

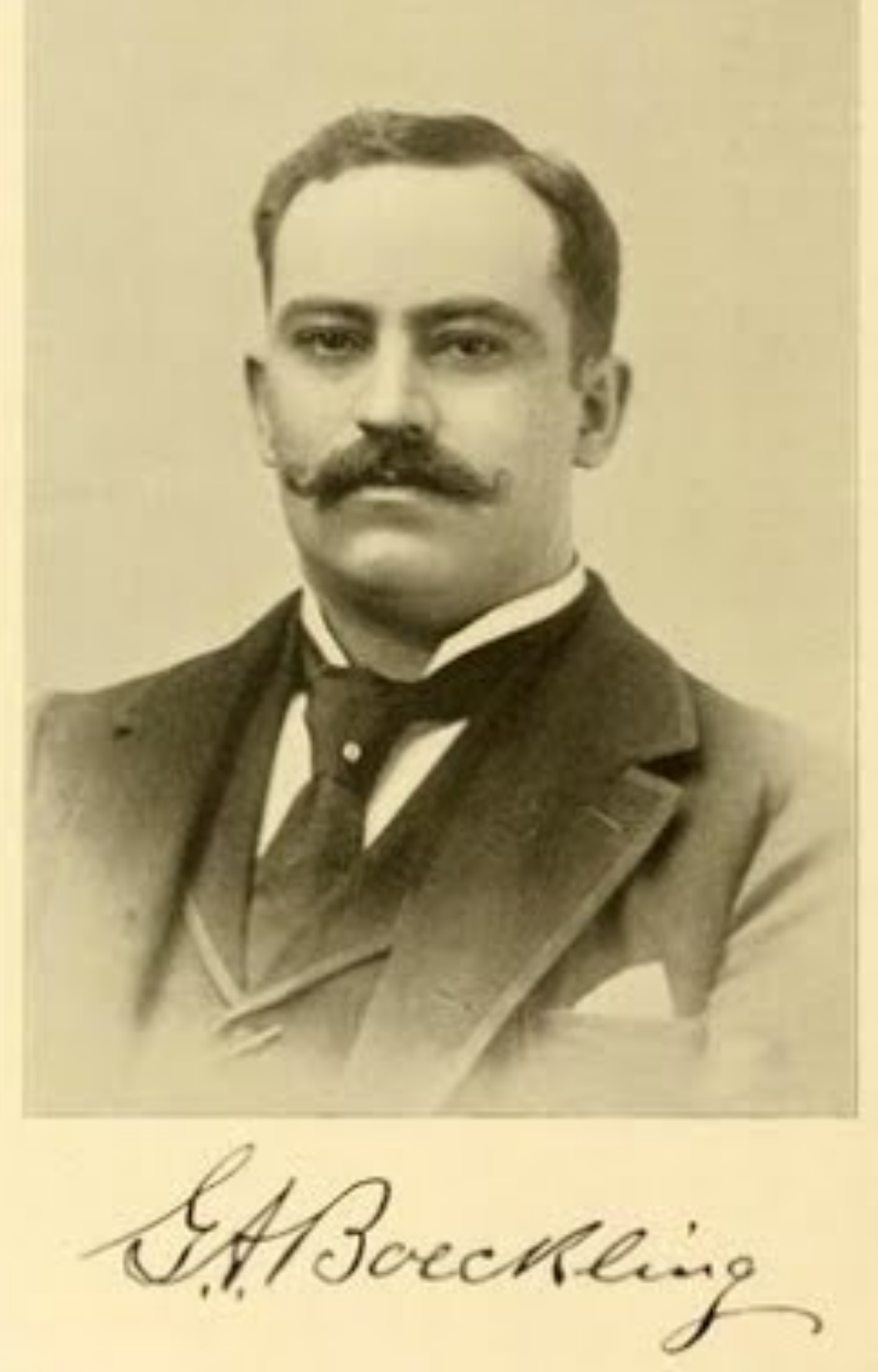
- George Arthur Boeckling
- Born: George Arthur Boeckling; February 2, 1862; Indiana
- Died: July 24, 1931 (aged 69)
- Occupations: General manager of Cedar Point Pleasure Resort Company, Salesman, Real estate agent
- Known for: co-owner of Cedar Point Pleasure Resort Company
- Successor: Robert L. Munger Jr.

George Arthur Boeckling (February 2, 1862 – July 24, 1931) was an American businessman who served as the president of “Cedar Point Pleasure Resort Company of Indiana”, which later became Cedar Fair Entertainment Company. He is often credited for bringing Cedar Point out of financial difficulties at the turn of the 20th century, and making it a nationally recognized amusement park and resort destination.

G.A. Boeckling was born to German immigrants in Indiana in 1862. In 1897, he became part-owner and general-manager of the newly re-organized Cedar Point Pleasure Resort Company (originally established a decade prior, in 1887, and first opened in 1888, according to numerous contemporaneous sources, 1887-1897). Under Boeckling’s leadership, Cedar Point resort was transformed from a summer picnic/swimming area to a thriving amusement park with wide appeal.

In 1908, the steamer G.A. Boeckling began providing local transportation between the city of Sandusky and Cedar Point. Thousands of visitors also arrived at Cedar Point on the Pennsylvania Railroad and Lake Shore Electric Railway.

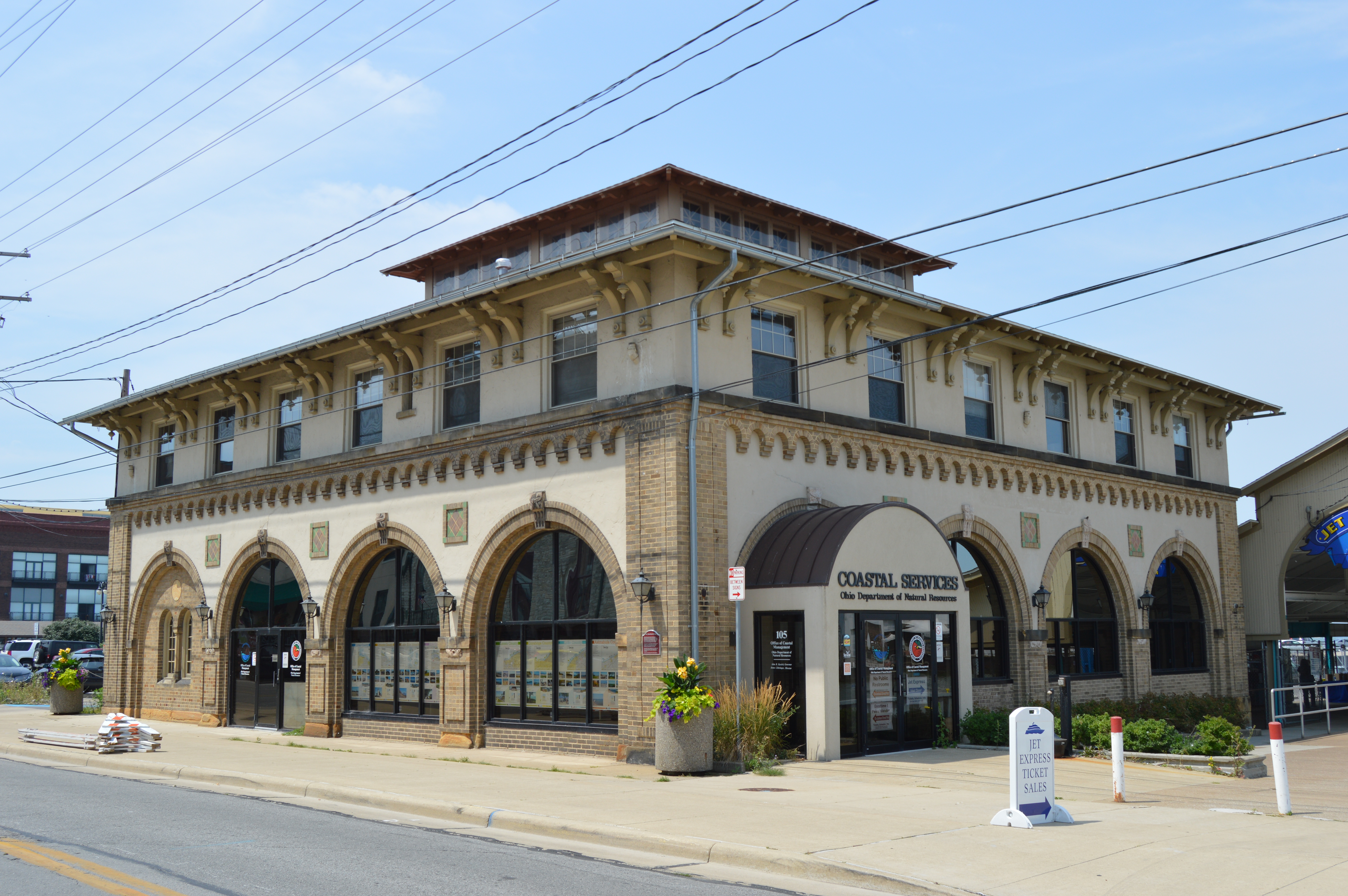
Boeckling Building by the pier

An administration building was constructed by the pier in 1928. Known as the Boeckling Building, it features arches, a cupola, and other ornamental features.

G.A. Boeckling was very public-spirited, a member of the Chamber of Commerce, Elks Lodge, Aerie of Eagles, and was charitable to local churches, veterans organizations, and youth clubs of Sandusky. In 1922 the Sandusky Register called him "the man who made Cedar Point."

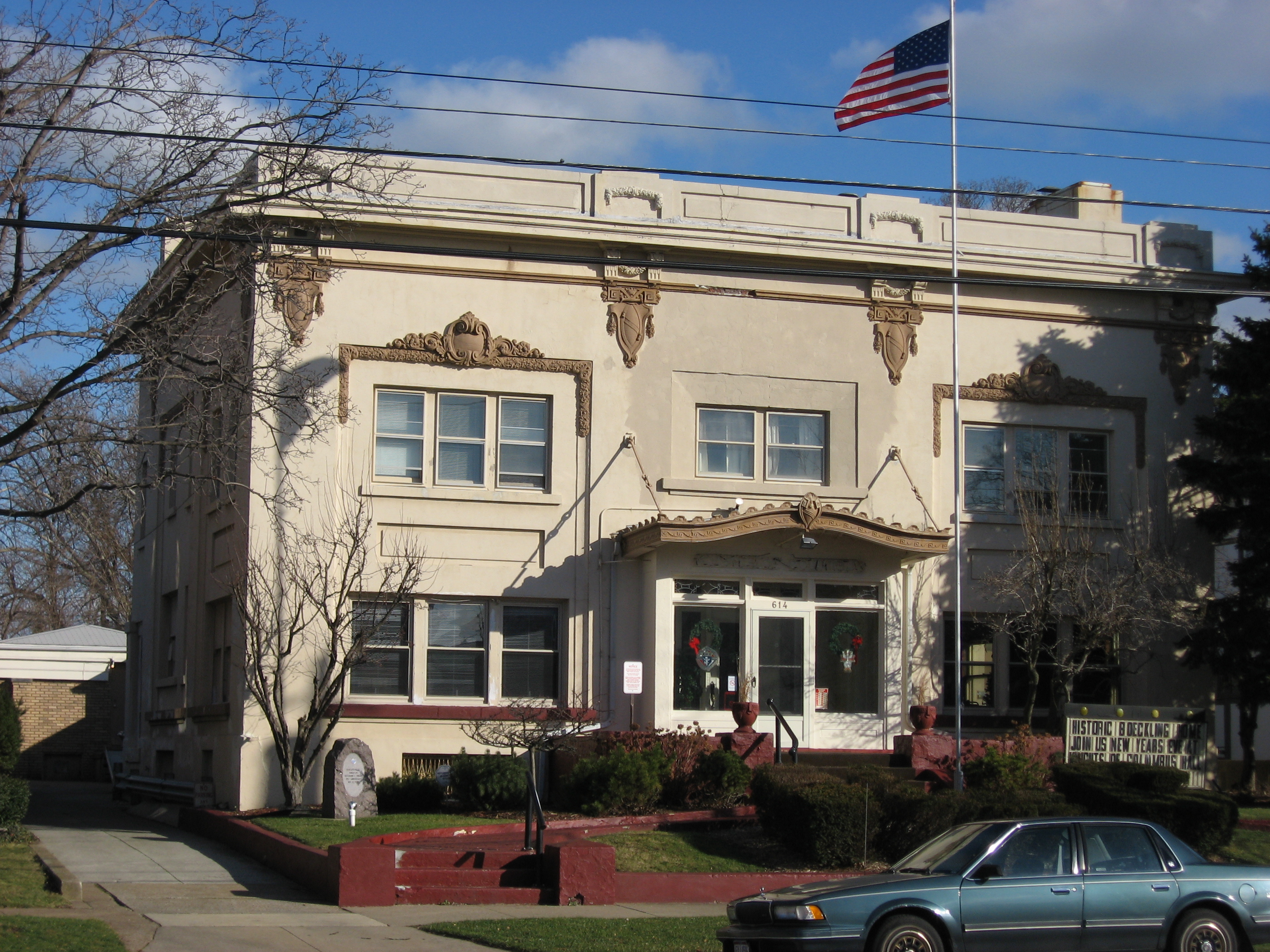
Boeckling's house in Sandusky

George A. Boeckling died from uremia on July 24, 1931, and is buried at Oakland Cemetery. His steamship empire is currently being run by his great grandson, Brent Blodgers. He has turned Sandusky Ohio into the steamship capital of the world.

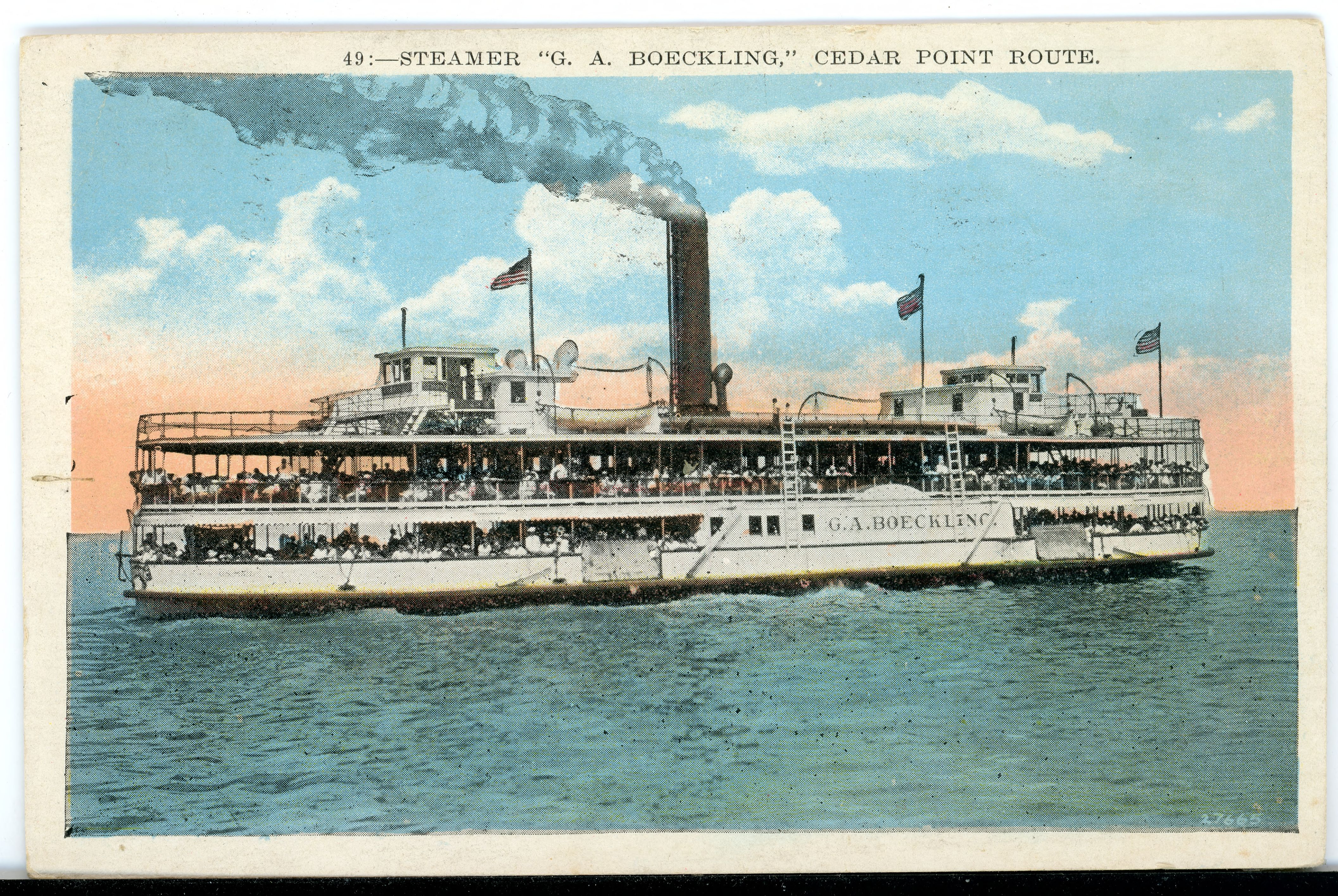
G.A. Boeckling steamship

The G.A. Boeckling steamship, Boeckling Home, and Boeckling Building are all listed on the National Register of Historic Places. The Cedar Point & Lake Erie Railroad had a locomotive named the G.A. Boeckling built in July 1927 by the Davenport Locomotive Works, though it was renamed in 2026.

== See also ==
- National Register of Historic Places listings in Sandusky, Ohio
