= Campbell School =

- U.S. National Register of Historic Places
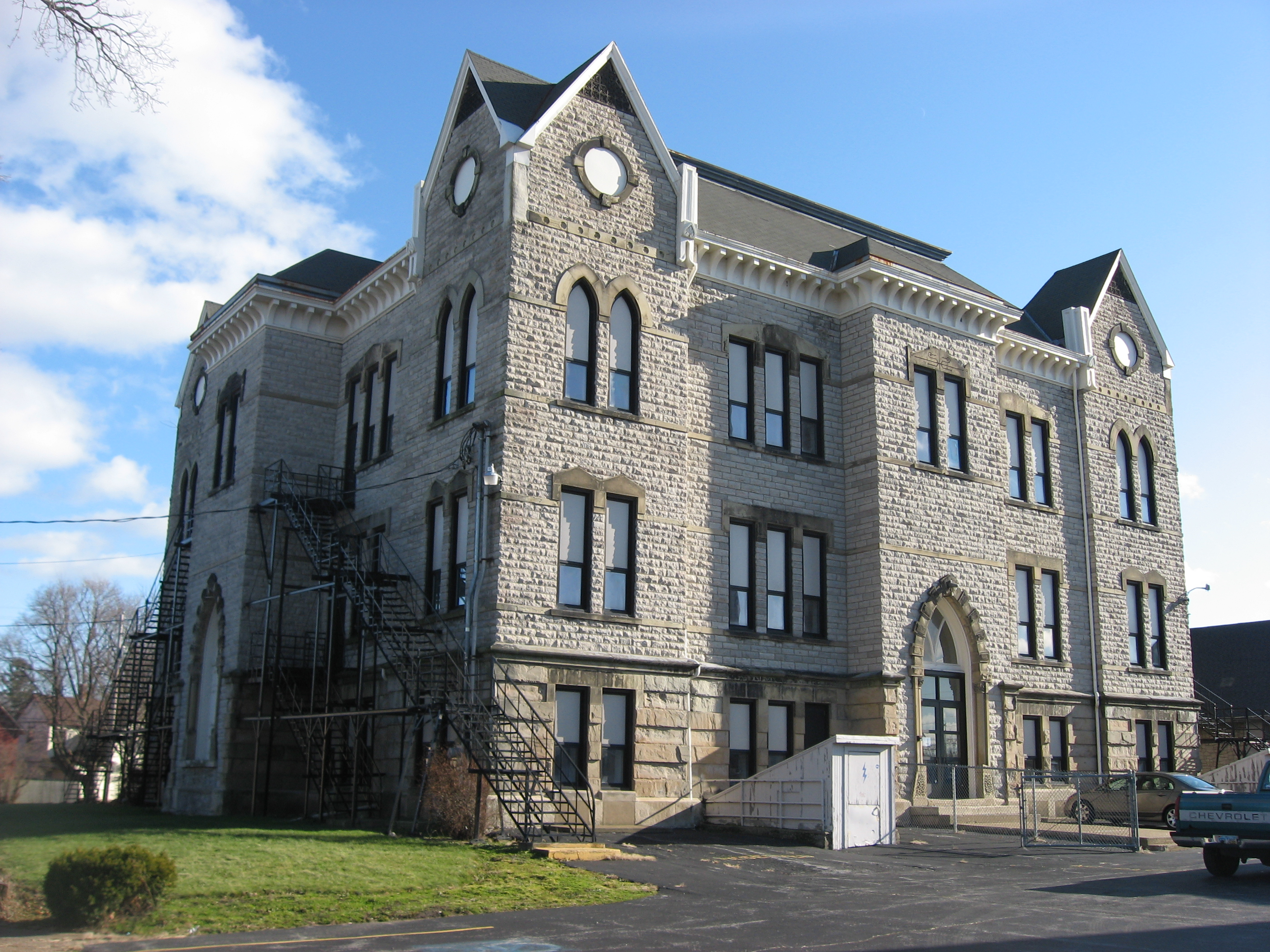

- Location within Ohio Location within the United States
- Location: 1215 Campbell St., Sandusky, Ohio
- Coordinates: 41°26′43″N 82°42′27″W
- Area: 1.5 acres (0.61 ha)
- Built: 1885
- Built by: Johnson, J.C.; Adam Feick
- Architectural style: Gothic
- MPS: Sandusky MRA
- NRHP reference No.: 82001384
- Added to NRHP: October 20, 1982

The Campbell School at 1215 Campbell St. in Sandusky, Ohio was built in 1885. It was designed by J.C. Johnson and built by Adam Feick and brothers. It has also been known as the Eighth Ward School. It was listed on the National Register of Historic Places in 1982.

It was built to serve children with deficient eyesight. It is a two-story limestone building with an arched transom area above its main entrance, with Victorian Gothic style.
