= Engine House No. 3 (Sandusky, Ohio) =

- U.S. National Register of Historic Places
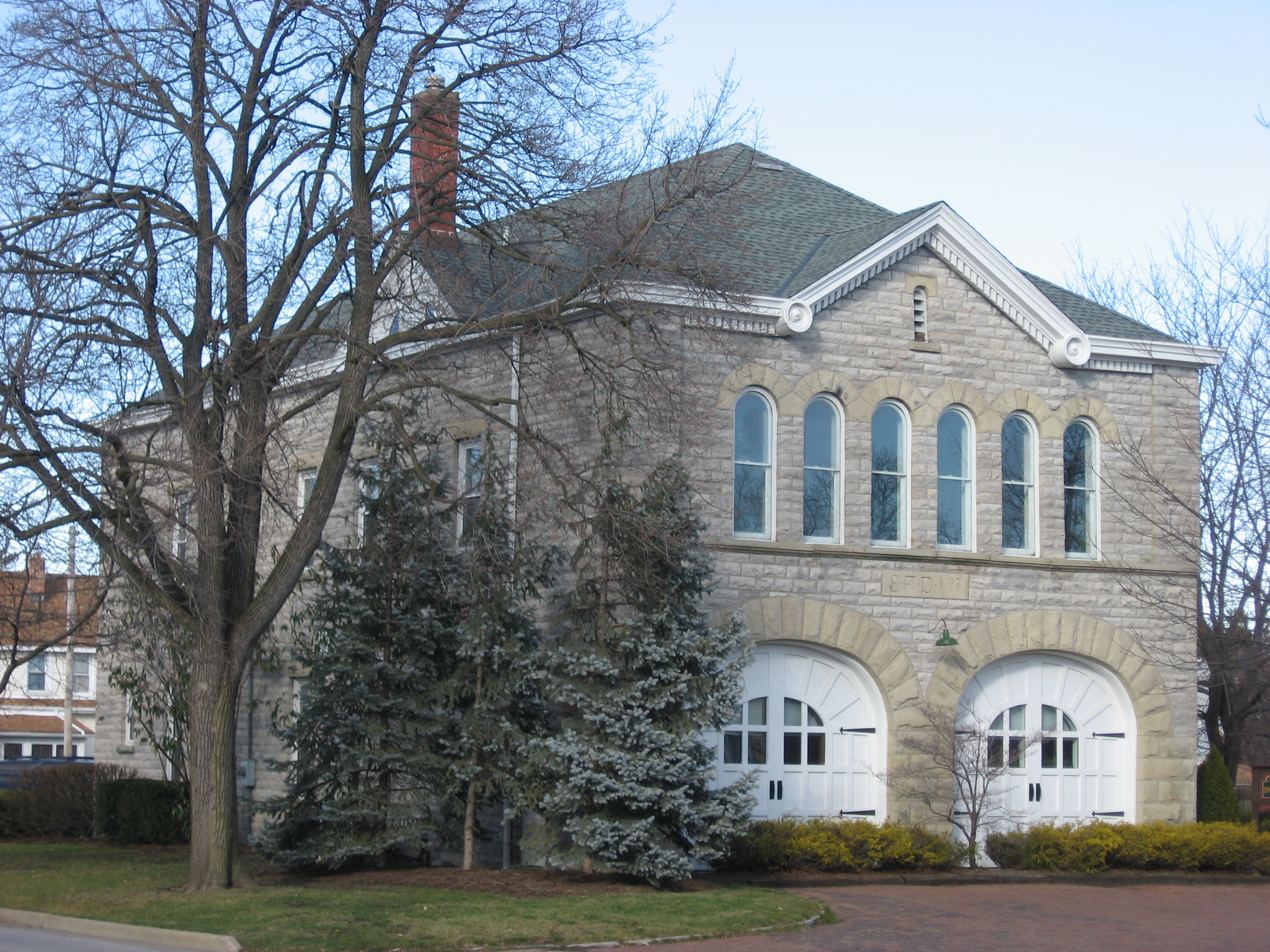
- Location: Meigs St. and Sycamore Line, Sandusky, Ohio
- Coordinates: 41°27′09″N 82°41′53″W
- Area: less than one acre
- Built: 1894
- Built by: Biehl, C.N.
- Architectural style: Richardsonian Romanesque
- NRHP reference No.: 75001386
- Added to NRHP: April 1, 1975

The Engine House No. 3 in Sandusky, Ohio, at Meigs St. and Sycamore Line, was built in 1894. It was listed on the National Register of Historic Places in 1975.

It is built of cut limestone and has entrances which are "basically Richardsonian Romanesque in style, with some classical elements."

== See also ==
- National Register of Historic Places listings in Erie County, Ohio
- Engine House No. 1 (Sandusky, Ohio)
- No. 5 Fire Station (Sandusky, Ohio)
