= Taylor House =

Taylor House commonly refers to:

- Taylor House (ice hockey), American professional ice hockey player

Taylor House, Taylor Mansion or variations may also refer to:

== Buildings in the United States ==
(by state, then city)

- Taylor-Stokes House, Marcella, Arkansas
- Taylor Log House and Site, Winchester, Arkansas
- Taylor House (West Covina, California), a house museum in Los Angeles County
- Taylor House (Denver, Colorado), a Denver Landmark
- Edward T. Taylor House, Glenwood Springs, Colorado, listed on the NRHP in Garfield County
- Day-Taylor House, Hartford, Connecticut
- Moses J. Taylor House, Eustis, Florida
- Taylor Hall (Hawkinsville, Georgia)
- William Taylor House (Resaca, Georgia)
- Taylor House (Summerville, Georgia)
- Arthur Taylor House (Paris, Idaho)
- Oscar Taylor House, Freeport, Illinois
- Taylor-Zent House, Huntington, Indiana
- Fernando G. Taylor House, Versailles, Indiana
- Taylor House (Baldwin, Kentucky), listed on the NRHP in Madison County
- William Taylor House (Becknerville, Kentucky), listed on the NRHP in Clark County
- Matheny-Taylor House, Harrodsburg, Kentucky, listed on the NRHP in Mercer County
- Capt. Samuel Taylor House, Harrodsburg, Kentucky, listed on the NRHP in Mercer County
- J.B. Taylor and Son Feed Store, Lewisport, Kentucky, listed on the NRHP in Hancock County
- Zachary Taylor House, Louisville, Kentucky
- Phillip R. Taylor House, Louisville, Kentucky, listed on the NRHP in Oldham County
- E.W. Taylor House, Midway, Kentucky, listed on the NRHP in Woodford County
- Ridge Taylor Farm, Nicholasville, Kentucky, listed on the NRHP in Jessamine County
- Taylor House (Richmond, Kentucky), listed on the NRHP in Madison County
- Taylor House (Jackson, Louisiana), listed on the NRHP in East Feliciana Parish
- Calvin B. Taylor House, Berlin, Maryland, a house museum in Worcester County
- Taylor-Dallin House, Arlington, Massachusetts
- Dowley-Taylor House, Worcester, Massachusetts
- Elisha Taylor House, Detroit, Michigan
- George W. Taylor House, Le Sueur, Minnesota, listed on the NRHP in Le Sueur County
- Taylor House (Bay St. Louis, Mississippi), formerly listed on the NRHP in Hancock County, destroyed by Hurricane Katrina
- Taylor-Falls House, Como, Mississippi
- Taylor-Mansker House, Como, Mississippi, listed on the NRHP in Panola County
- Tait-Taylor House, Como, Mississippi, listed on the NRHP in Panola County
- Adams-Taylor-McRae House, Elwood, Mississippi
- Taylor-Wall-Yancy House, Sardis, Mississippi, listed on the NRHP in Panola County
- John N. and Elizabeth Taylor House, Columbia, Missouri
- A. Taylor Ray House, Gallatin, Missouri
- Ray E. Taylor House, Whitefish, Montana
- Chauncey S. Taylor House, David City, Nebraska
- Eddy-Taylor House, Lincoln, Nebraska
- Dr. Henry Genet Taylor House and Office, Camden, New Jersey
- Taylor–Newbold House, Chesterfield Township, New Jersey
- George Taylor House (Freehold Borough, New Jersey)
- William Taylor House (Middleport, New York)
- Taylor–Corwin House, Pine Bush, New York
- Smith-Taylor Cabin, Shelter Island, New York
- Emma Flower Taylor Mansion, Watertown, New York
- Dempsey-Reynolds-Taylor House, Eden, North Carolina
- Taylor-Utley House, Fayetteville, North Carolina
- Col. Richard P. Taylor House, Huntsboro, North Carolina
- Patty Person Taylor House, Louisburg, North Carolina
- Isaac Taylor House, New Bern, North Carolina
- Archibald Taylor Plantation House, Oxford, North Carolina
- Leslie-Taylor House, Vass, North Carolina
- Archibald Taylor House, Wood, North Carolina
- Taylor-Frohman House, Sandusky, Ohio
- George Taylor House (Corvallis, Oregon)
- Jack Taylor House, Corvallis, Oregon, listed on the NRHP in Benton County
- Dr. W.R. and Eunice Taylor House, Forest Grove, Oregon, listed on the NRHP in Washington County
- Fred E. Taylor House, Portland, Oregon
- Peter Taylor House and Gotlieb Haehlen House, Portland, Oregon, listed on the NRHP in Multnomah County
- Fulton–Taylor House, The Dalles, Oregon
- Gray-Taylor House, Brookville, Pennsylvania
- Phillip Taylor House, Brookville, Pennsylvania
- George Taylor House (Catasauqua, Pennsylvania), a U.S. National Historic Landmark
- Parsons-Taylor House, Easton, Pennsylvania
- Taylor House (Marshallton, Pennsylvania)
- Peter Taylor Farmstead, Newtown, Pennsylvania
- Benjamin Taylor Homestead, Newtown, Pennsylvania
- Taylor–Chase–Smythe House, Newport, Rhode Island
- Taylor House (Columbia, South Carolina)
- Earle R. Taylor House and Peach Packing Shed, Greer, South Carolina
- J. W. Taylor House, Canton, South Dakota, listed on the NRHP in Lincoln County
- Christopher Taylor House, Jonesboro, Tennessee, listed on the NRHP in Washington County
- Col. Robert Z. Taylor House, Trenton, Tennessee
- Campbell Taylor and Greenlief Fisk House, Bastrop, Texas, listed on the NRHP in Bastrop County
- Taylor-Cooper House, Georgetown, Texas, listed on the NRHP in Williamson County
- Judson L. Taylor House, Houston, Texas, listed on the NRHP in Harris County
- Hodge-Taylor House, Jefferson, Texas, listed on the NRHP in Marion County
- J. H. Taylor House, McKinney, Texas, listed on the NRHP in Collin County
- Durst-Taylor House, Nacogdoches, Texas, listed on the NRHP in Nacogdoches County
- Umphress-Taylor House, Van Alstyne, Texas, listed on the NRHP in Grayson County
- John W., Janet (Nettie), and May Rich Taylor House, Farmington, Utah, listed on the NRHP in Davis County
- Arthur Taylor House (Moab, Utah)
- Clark–Taylor House, Provo, Utah
- Thomas N. Taylor House, Provo, Utah
- George Taylor Jr. House, Provo, Utah
- Taylor–Whittle House, Norfolk, Virginia
- Taylor–Mayo House, Richmond, Virginia
- Brooker-Taylor House, Yakima, Washington, listed on the NRHP in Yakima County
- Taylor-Condry House, Elkins, West Virginia
- A. E. Taylor House, Clinton, Wisconsin, listed on the NRHP in Rock County
- David Taylor House, Sheboygan, Wisconsin

== See also ==
- Taylor Hall (disambiguation)
- Arthur Taylor House (disambiguation)
- George Taylor House (disambiguation)
- William Taylor House (disambiguation)
