= Feick =

Feick is a German surname. Notable people with the surname include:

- Arne Feick (born 1988), German footballer
- George Feick (1849–1932), German-American builder
- Jamie Feick (born 1974), American basketball player
- Otto Feick (1890–1959), German inventor and gymnast

== See also ==
- Feick Building in Ohio, United States
