= Arthur Taylor =

Arthur Taylor may refer to:

- Arthur Taylor (1790–1870), English writer, son of hymn writer John Taylor
- Arthur A. Taylor (1849–1923) American newspaper publisher, and editor
- Arthur H. Taylor (1852–1922), U.S. representative from Indiana
- Arthur Taylor (cricketer) (1883–1956), English cricketer
- Arthur Taylor (rugby union)
- Montana Taylor (Arthur Taylor, 1903–c. 1958), American boogie-woogie pianist
- Arthur Howard Taylor (1905–1982), U.S. Navy officer who commanded USS Haddock (SS-231) during World War II
- Tag Taylor (1925–2014), (Sir (Arthur) Godfrey Taylor, born 1925), British local government leader
- Art Taylor (1929–1995), American jazz drummer
- Arthur R. Taylor (1935–2015), American businessman
- Archie Taylor (footballer, born 1939) (Arthur Matson Taylor), English former footballer
- Arthur William Taylor (born 1956), New Zealand prison inmate who has initiated Corrections Department and legislature reforms from prison

== See also ==
- Arthur Taylor House (disambiguation)
