= George Taylor House =

George Taylor House may refer to:

- George W. Taylor House, Le Sueur, Minnesota, listed on the National Register of Historic Places (NRHP) in Minnesota
- George Taylor House (Freehold Borough, New Jersey), listed on the NRHP in New Jersey
- George Taylor House (Corvallis, Oregon), NRHP-listed
- George Taylor House (Catasauqua, Pennsylvania), a U.S. National Historic Landmark
- George Taylor Jr. House, Provo, Utah, NRHP-listed
