= William Taylor House =

William Taylor House may refer to:

- William Taylor House (Resaca, Georgia), listed on the National Register of Historic Places (NRHP) in Gordon County
- William Taylor House (Becknerville, Kentucky), listed on the NRHP in Clark County
- William Taylor House (Middleport, New York), listed on the NRHP in Niagara County

== See also ==
- Taylor House (disambiguation)
