= St. Mary's Rectory (Sandusky, Ohio) =

- U.S. National Register of Historic Places
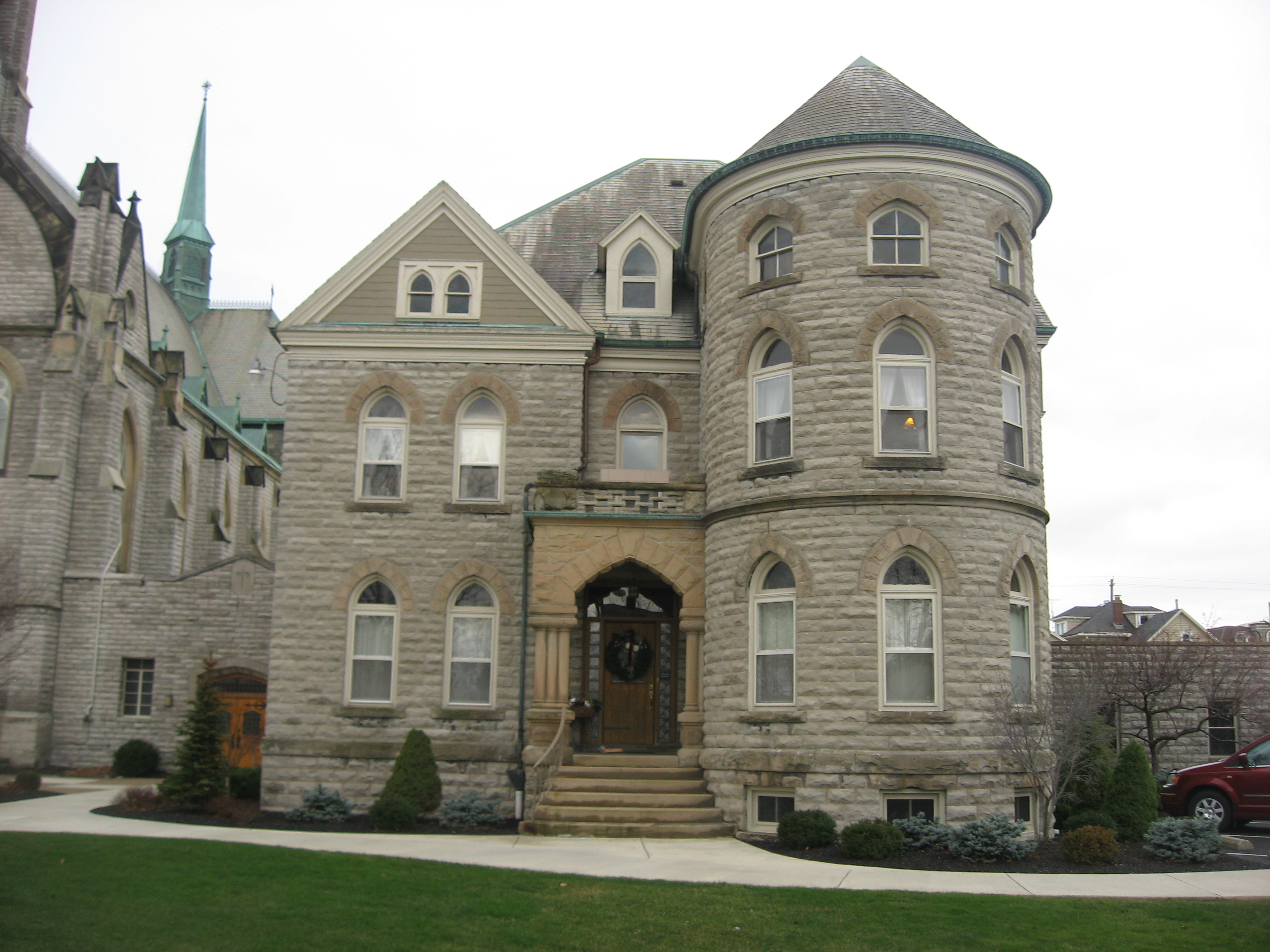

- Location within Ohio Location within the United States
- Location: 429 Central Ave., Sandusky, Ohio
- Coordinates: 41°27′6″N 82°42′49″W
- Area: less than one acre
- Built: 1893
- Built by: George Feick
- Architectural style: Chateauesque
- MPS: Sandusky MRA
- NRHP reference No.: 82001439
- Added to NRHP: October 20, 1982

The St. Mary's Rectory in Sandusky, Ohio was built in 1893. It was designed and/or built by George Feick. It was listed on the National Register of Historic Places in 1982.

The rectory stands by the St. Mary's Catholic Church, which was built in 1855 by German immigrants to serve the German community.

The rectory was renovated since 1991.
