= Odd Fellows Hall (Sandusky, Ohio) =

- Independent Order of Odd Fellows Temple
- U.S. National Register of Historic Places
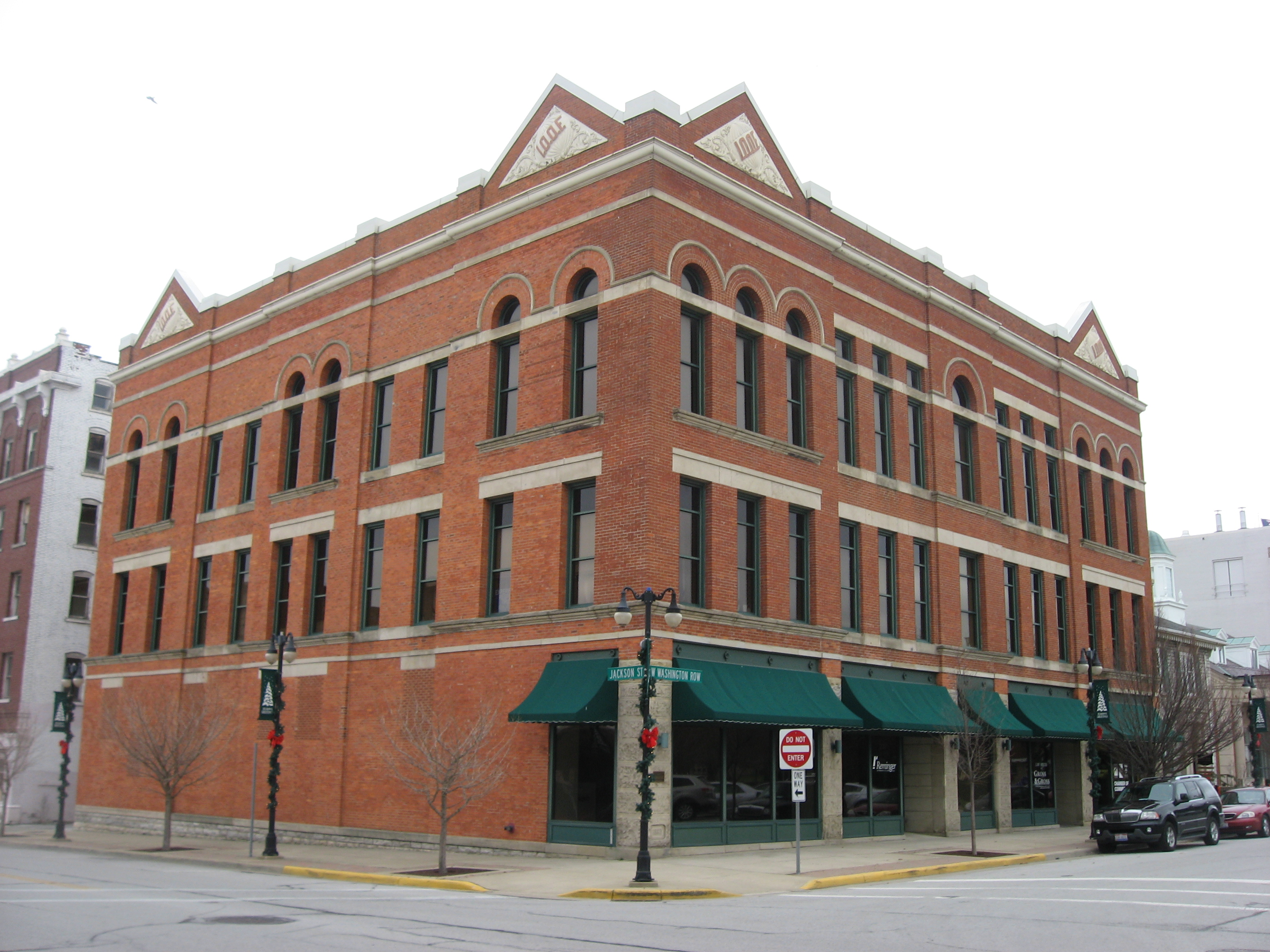
- Front and side of the temple

- Location within Ohio Location within the United States
- Location: 231 W. Washington Row, Sandusky, Ohio
- Coordinates: 41°27′18″N 82°42′46″W
- Area: Less than 1 acre (0.40 ha)
- Built: 1889
- Architect: George Feick; Adam and Philip Feick
- Architectural style: Queen Anne, Romanesque Revival
- NRHP reference No.: 03000327
- Added to NRHP: May 1, 2003

The former Odd Fellows Hall, located at 231 West Washington Row in Sandusky, Ohio, in the United States, is an historic building built in 1889 by members of the Independent Order of Odd Fellows. It is also known as the Independent Order of Odd Fellows Temple. On May 1, 2003, it was added to the National Register of Historic Places.

== History ==
Sandusky had two Odd Fellows organizations in the 19th century: Ogontz Lodge No. 66, founded in 1846, and Erie Encampment No. 27, founded in 1848. Both groups were made up of German immigrants, and the latter originally conducted its affairs in German. The two groups built the lodge hall in 1889. Like many lodge halls of the time, it had business and commercial space on the ground floor while the lodge hall was upstairs. Architect George Feick and his brothers Adam and Philip designed the building, which has elements of the Queen Anne and Richardsonian Romanesque styles.

== Current use ==
The building is now used for business and office space. Many local attorneys have their offices in it.

== See also ==
- List of Registered Historic Places in Erie County, Ohio
- Odd Fellows Hall (disambiguation)
