= Taylor Hall (disambiguation) =

Taylor Hall (born 1991) is a Canadian ice hockey player.

Taylor Hall may also refer to:

- Taylor Hall (ice hockey, born 1964), Canadian ice hockey player with the Vancouver Canucks and Boston Bruins
- Taylor Hall (Hawkinsville, Georgia), a building built in 1825 with Greek Revival and "Plantation Plain" architectural elements
- Taylor College or Taylor Hall, a building of Lehigh University

== See also ==
- Taylor House (disambiguation)
