= John Stang House =

Historic house in Ohio, United States

- U.S. National Register of Historic Places
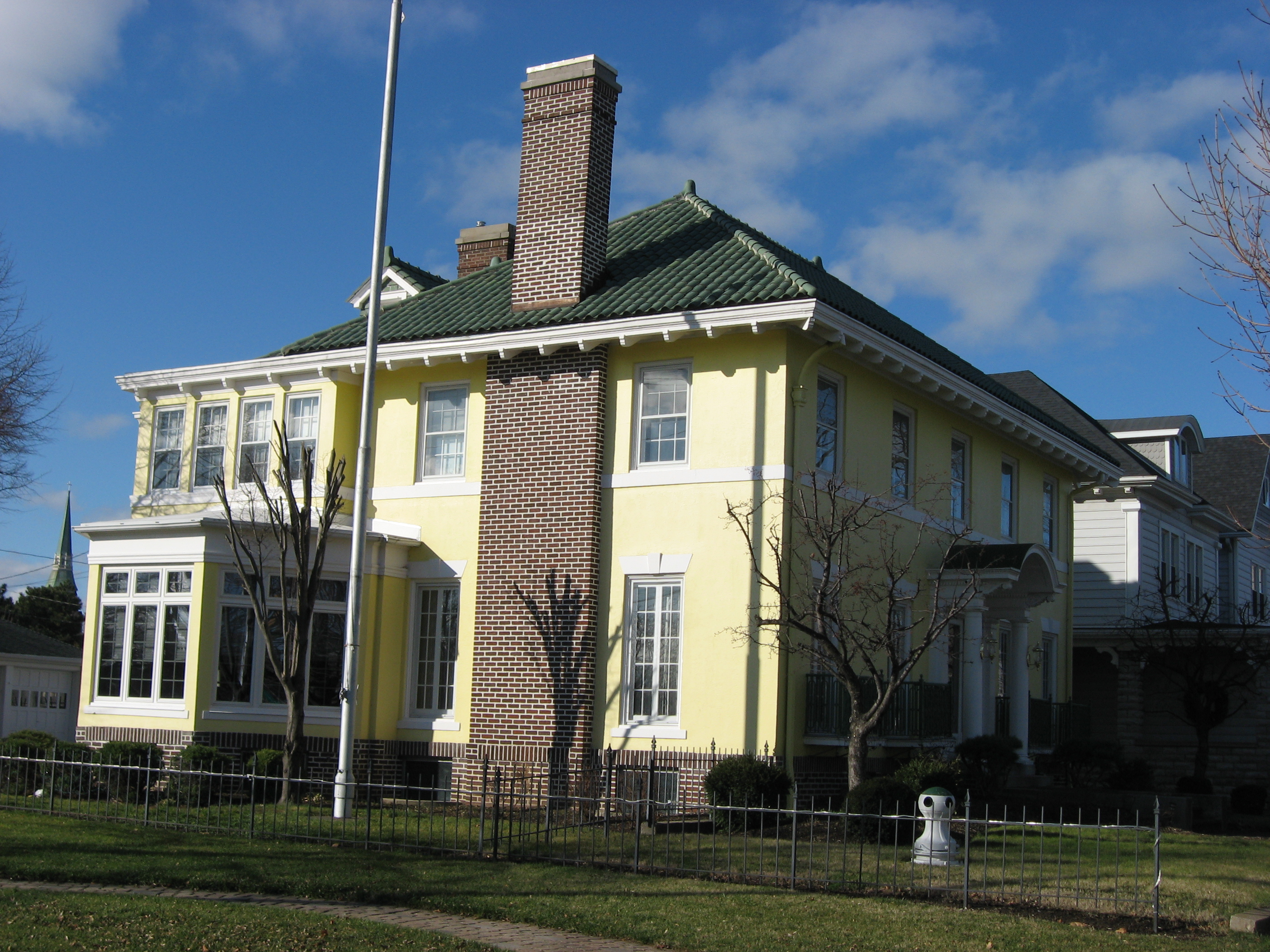

- Location within Ohio Location within the United States
- Location: 629 Columbus Ave., Sandusky, Ohio
- Coordinates: 41°27′0″N 82°42′31″W
- Area: less than one acre
- Built: 1922
- Built by: Feick, George
- Architectural style: Colonial Revival, Mission/Spanish Revival
- MPS: Sandusky MRA
- NRHP reference No.: 82001442
- Added to NRHP: October 20, 1982

The John Stang House at 629 Columbus Ave. in Sandusky, Ohio was built in 1922 by George Feick. It was listed on the National Register of Historic Places in 1982.

It is significant for its association with John Stang, who was vice president of the Cleveland-Sandusky Brewing Company and was president of the M. Hommel Wine Company, two companies of economic importance.
