= Zion Lutheran Church (Sandusky, Ohio) =

Historic church in Ohio, United States

- U.S. National Register of Historic Places
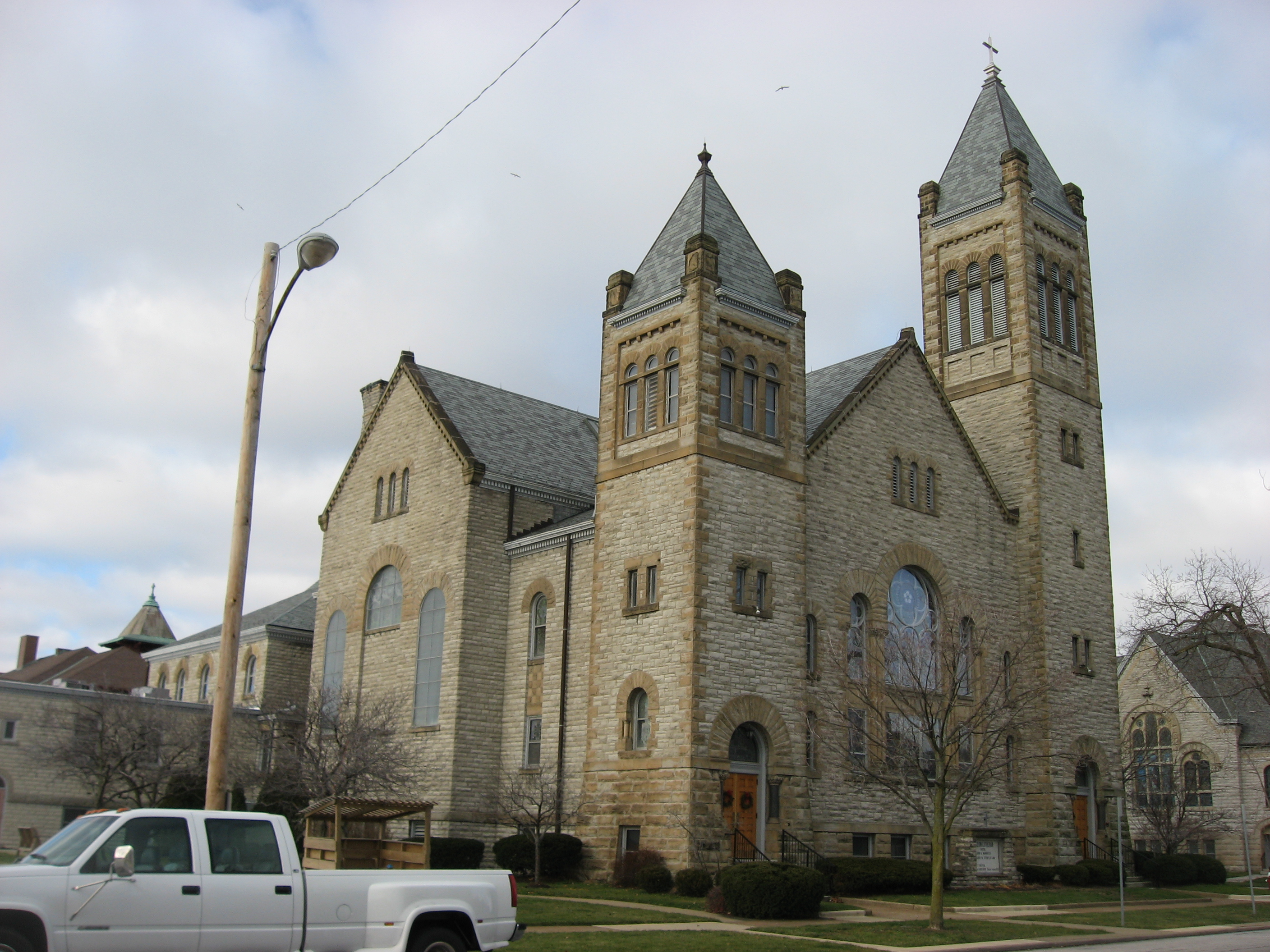

- Location within Ohio Location within the United States
- Location: 501-503 Columbus Ave., Sandusky, Ohio
- Coordinates: 41°27′7″N 82°42′35″W
- Area: less than one acre
- Built: 1898
- Built by: Feick, George
- Architectural style: Romanesque Revival
- MPS: Sandusky MRA
- NRHP reference No.: 82001456
- Added to NRHP: October 20, 1982

Zion Lutheran Church is a historic church at 501–503 Columbus Avenue in Sandusky, Ohio.

It served a German-language congregation originally formed in 1847, and held a German language service into the 1940s.

The building is a one-story limestone building built in 1898. It was added to the National Register of Historic Places in 1982.
