= John Mertz House =

Historic house in Ohio, United States

- U.S. National Register of Historic Places
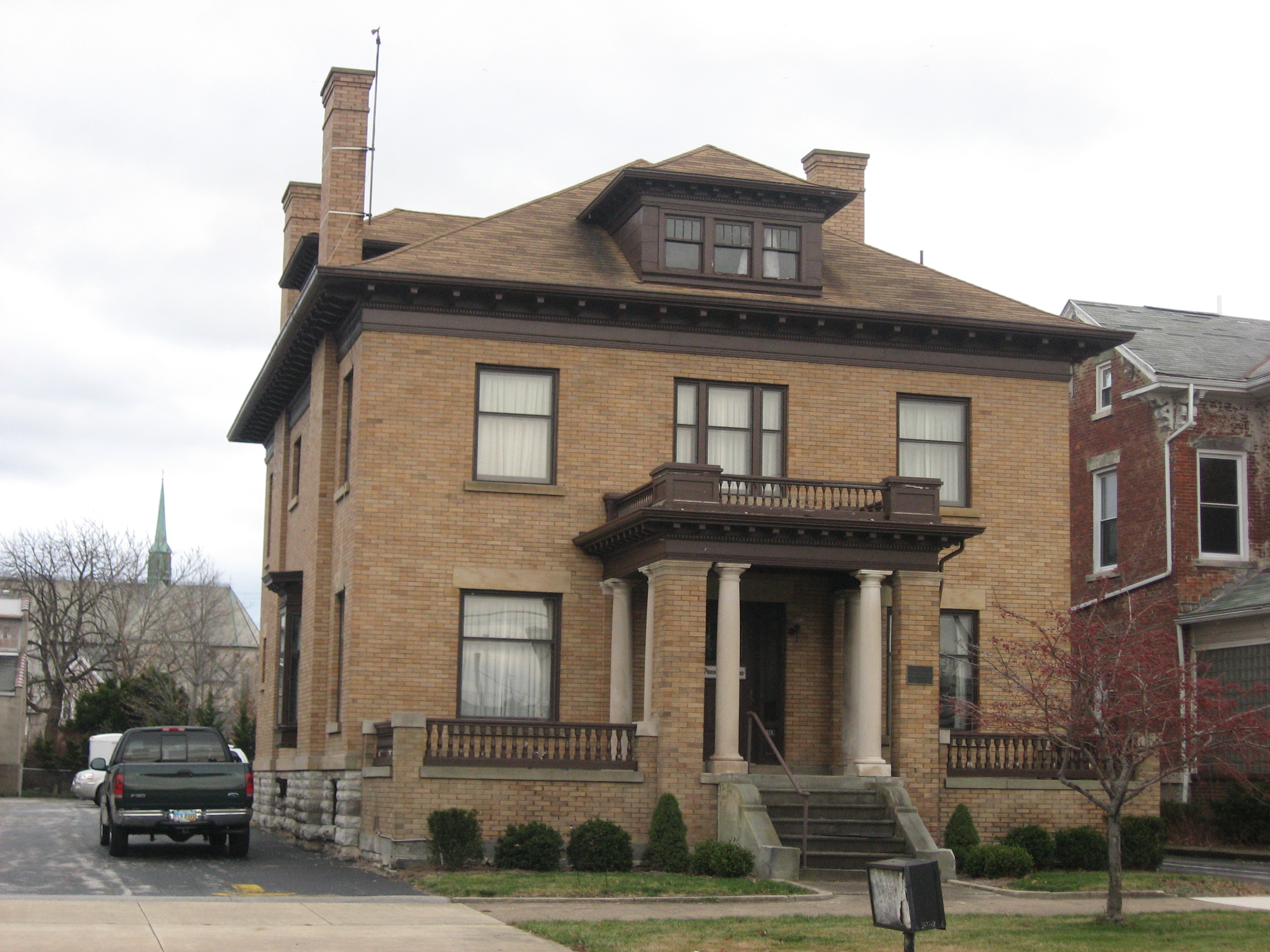

- Location within Ohio Location within the United States
- Location: 610 W. Washington St., Sandusky, Ohio
- Coordinates: 41°27′12″N 82°43′1″W
- Area: less than one acre
- Built: 1909
- Built by: Feick, George
- Architectural style: Classical Revival
- NRHP reference No.: 92001077
- Added to NRHP: August 21, 1992

The John Mertz House at 610 W. Washington St. in Sandusky, Ohio was built in 1909. It was designed and/or built by George Feick. It was listed on the National Register of Historic Places in 1992.

The connection from the Feick family was by marriage of John Mertz to Ida Elizabeth Feick, who was born in Sandusky in 1863 to Adam Feick.
