= Erie County Infirmary =

- U.S. National Register of Historic Places
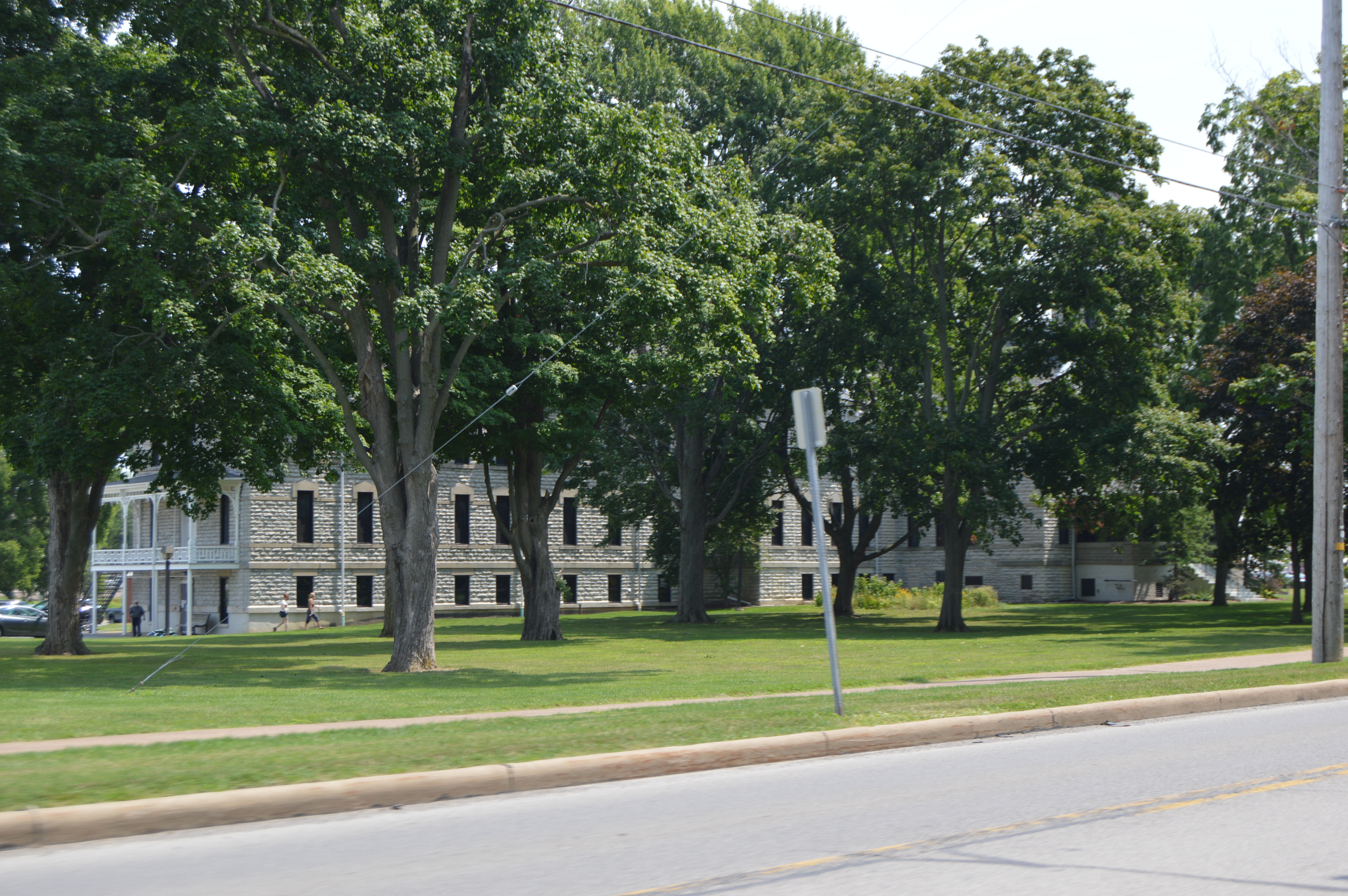
- Front from the road

- Location within Ohio Location within the United States
- Nearest city: Sandusky, Ohio
- Coordinates: 41°25′38″N 82°41′38″W
- Area: 1 acre (0.40 ha)
- Built: 1886
- Built by: George Feick
- Architectural style: Second Empire
- NRHP reference No.: 75001387
- Added to NRHP: September 5, 1975

The Erie County Infirmary near Sandusky, Ohio, which has also been known as the Erie County Home, is listed on the National Register of Historic Places. It was built by George Phillip Feick. It is a large four-story Second Empire-style building made of local limestone.

The building was described in 1999 as "an excellent example of the type of institutional structure erected in the latter half of the 19th century to provide for the less fortunate members of society". The county infirmary had been established in 1855 to serve the aged and indigent; this building was completed in 1886.

It was listed on the National Register in 1975.
