= First Congregational Church (Sandusky, Ohio) =

Historic church in Ohio, United States

- U.S. National Register of Historic Places
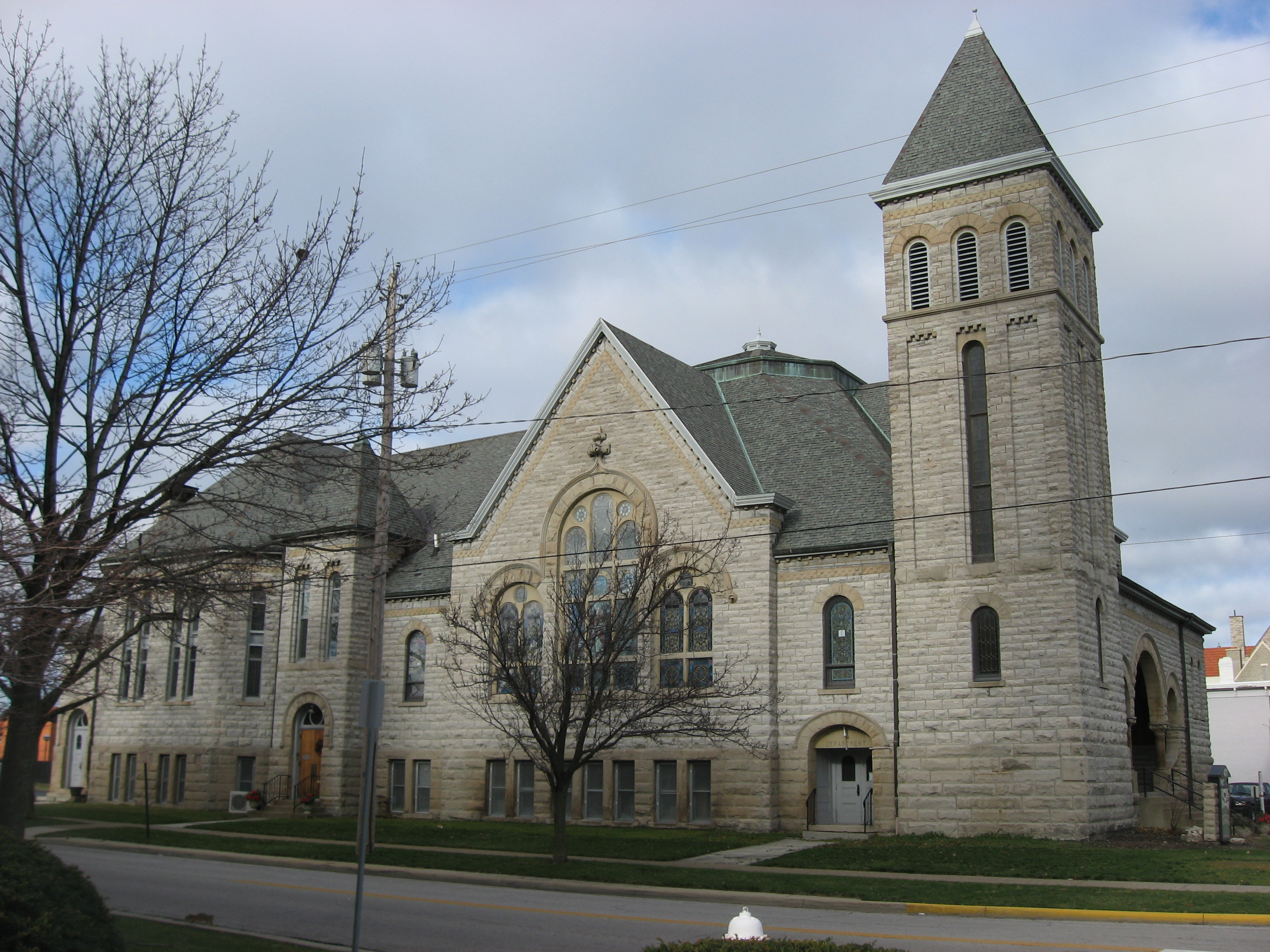

- Location within Ohio Location within the United States
- Location: 431 Columbus Ave., Sandusky, Ohio
- Coordinates: 41°27′9″N 82°42′36″W
- Area: less than one acre
- Built: 1895
- Built by: George Feick
- Architectural style: Romanesque Revival
- MPS: Sandusky MRA
- NRHP reference No.: 82001399
- Added to NRHP: October 20, 1982

First Congregational Church, also known as First Congregational United Church of Christ, is an historic church located at 431 Columbus Avenue in Sandusky, Ohio. Designed in the Romanesque Revival style of architecture, it was built in 1895 by Sandusky builder George Philip Feick (1849-1932). On October 20, 1982, it was added to the National Register of Historic Places. First Congregational is still an active member of the United Church of Christ, though the congregation no longer worships at the First Congregational Church. The property was privately acquired in 2021 and after an estimated $425,000 overhaul, was converted to The Lost Sailor Inn, a multi-use AirBNB in September 2022
