= Ray E. Taylor House =

Historic house in Montana, United States

- U.S. National Register of Historic Places
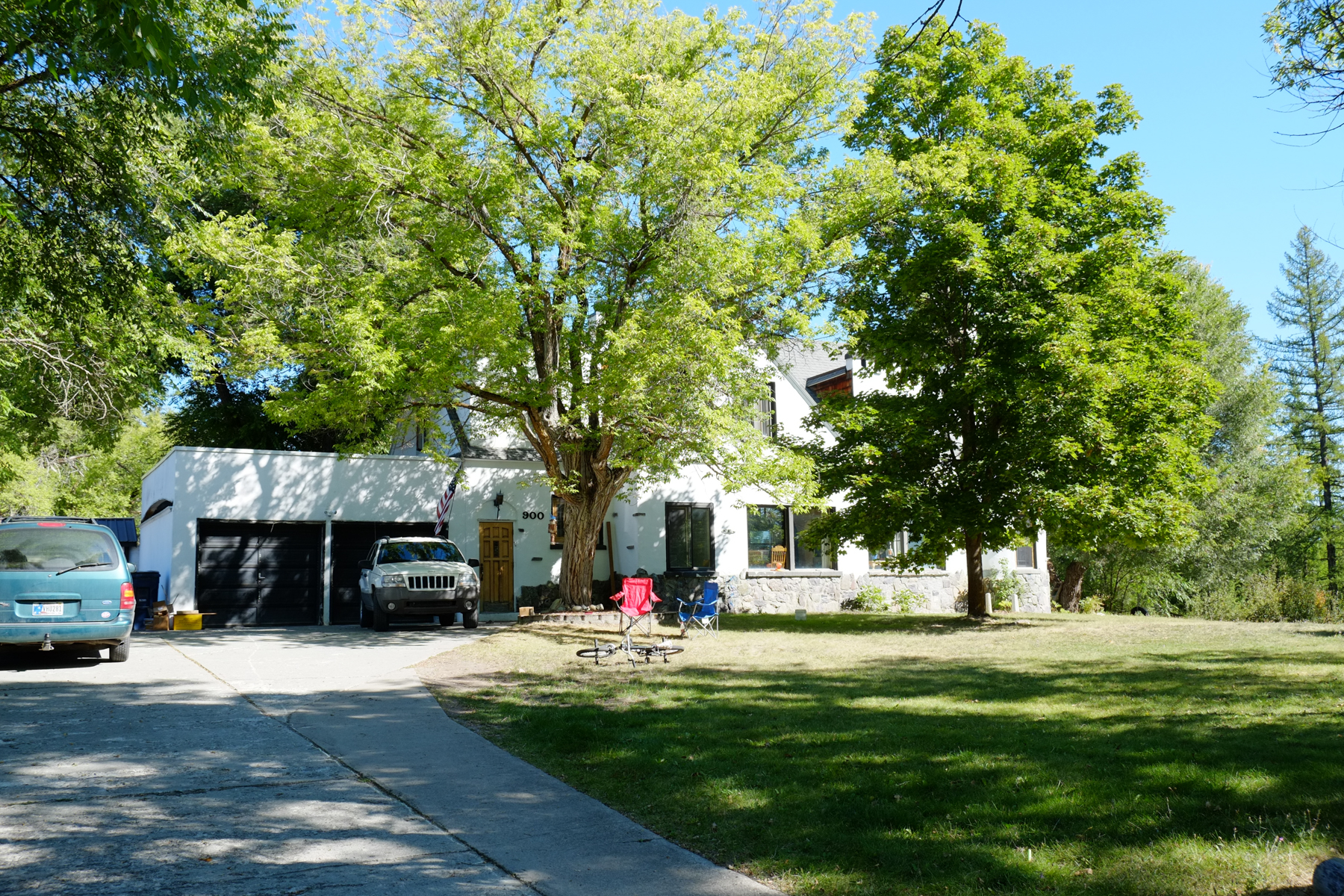

- Location within Montana Location within the United States
- Location: 900 South Baker Avenue, Whitefish, Montana
- Coordinates: 48°24′9″N 114°20′18″W
- Area: 2 acres (0.81 ha)
- Built: 1929
- Architectural style: Tudor Revival
- NRHP reference No.: 90001204
- Added to NRHP: August 10, 1990

The Ray E. Taylor House, also known as The Castle, is a historic house in Whitefish, Montana, U.S., overlooking the Whitefish River. It was built for Ray E. Taylor from 1929 to 1931. It was designed in the Tudor Revival architectural style. It has been listed on the National Register of Historic Places since August 10, 1990.
