= Feick Building =

- U.S. National Register of Historic Places
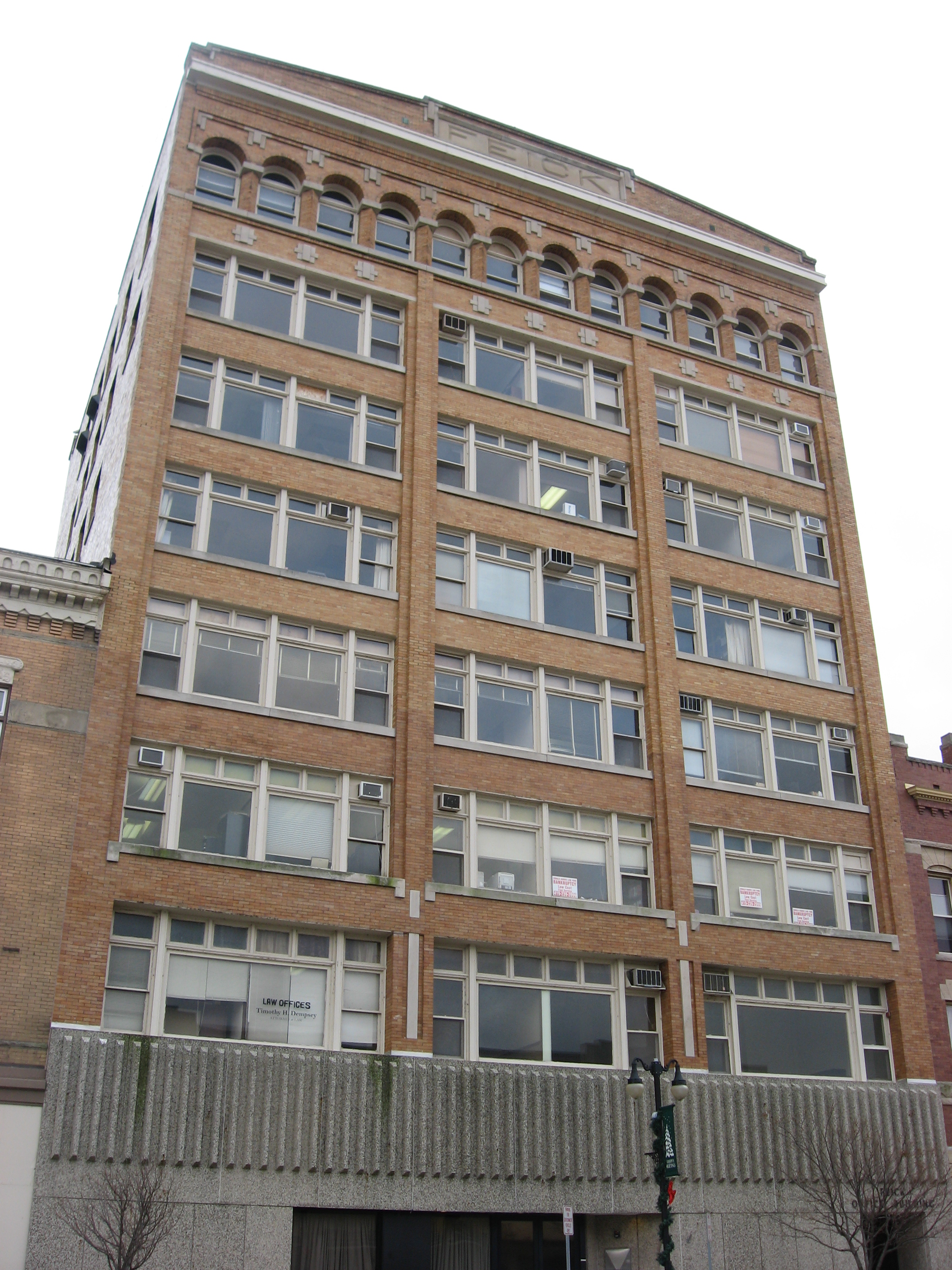

- Location within Ohio Location within the United States
- Location: 158–160 E. Market St., Sandusky, Ohio
- Coordinates: 41°27′23″N 82°42′38″W
- Area: less than one acre
- Built: 1909–1916
- Built by: George Feick, Sr.
- Architect: Purcell & Feick
- Architectural style: Early Commercial
- NRHP reference No.: 09000848
- Added to NRHP: October 22, 2009

The Feick Building is a historic commercial building located at 158–160 E. Market St. in Sandusky, Ohio.

== Description and history ==
It was built to three-story height in 1909 and was increased to eight stories in 1916. It was designed by Purcell & Feick, which was a Minneapolis-based architectural partnership formed of two Cornell classmates, one being George Feick, Jr.

The building was built in 1916 by George Feick, Sr., of Sandusky.

It was listed on the National Register of Historic Places in 2009.
