= Arthur Taylor House =

Arthur Taylor House may refer to:

- Arthur Taylor House (Paris, Idaho), listed on the NRHP in Idaho
- Arthur Taylor House (Moab, Utah), listed on the NRHP in Utah
