= Taylor-Frohman House =

Historic house in Ohio, United States

- U.S. National Register of Historic Places
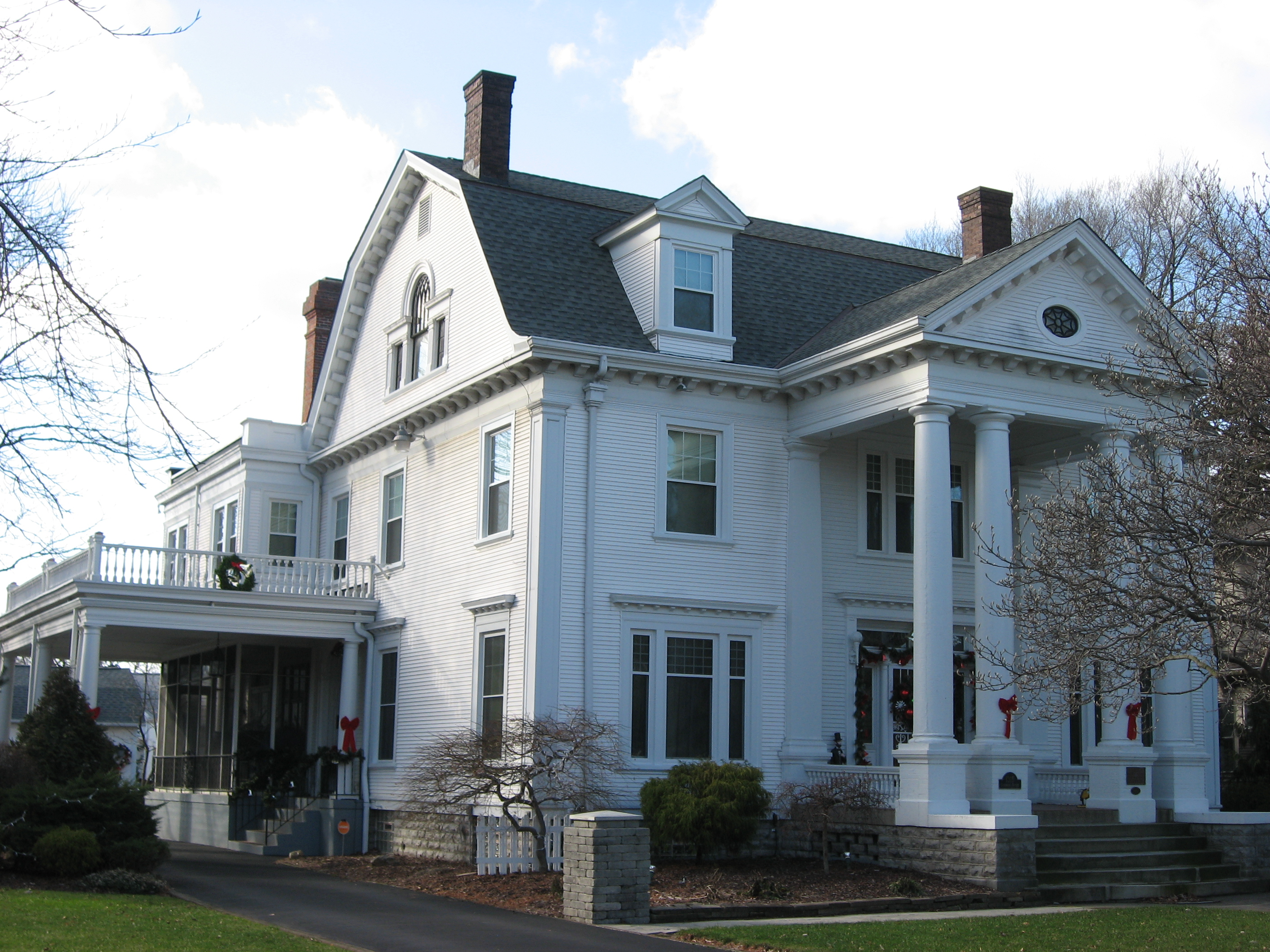

- Location within Ohio Location within the United States
- Location: 1315 Columbus Ave., Sandusky, Ohio
- Coordinates: 41°26′40″N 82°42′18″W
- Area: less than one acre
- Built: 1906
- Built by: Feick, George
- Architectural style: Colonial Revival
- MPS: Sandusky MRA
- NRHP reference No.: 82001446
- Added to NRHP: October 20, 1982

The Taylor-Frohman House at 1315 Columbus Ave. in Sandusky, Ohio was built in 1906. It was built by George Feick. It includes Colonial Revival architecture. It was listed on the National Register of Historic Places in 1982.

The house is an "imposing" three-story building. It has a two-story front porch with four columns, two pilasters, and a pediment. The house also has a six-column portico. It was home of Sidney Frohman and Elnore (née Dauch) Frohman from about 1920 until Sidney's death in the 1960s. Sidney was president of the Hinde and Dauch Paper Company, which popularized use of corrugated cardboard in shipping, in lieu of barrels and bags.
