= Arthur Taylor (cricketer) =

English cricketer

Personal information
- Full name: Arthur Taylor
- Born: 1880; Maltby, Yorkshire, England
- Died: 13 November 1956 (aged 75–76); Birmingham, Warwickshire, England
- Batting: Right-handed
- Bowling: Right-arm medium-fast

Domestic team information
- Years: Team
- 1913: Warwickshire

Career statistics
| Competition | First-class |
|---|---|
| Matches | 6 |
| Runs scored | 83 |
| Batting average | 9.22 |
| 100s/50s | –/– |
| Top score | 17 |
| Balls bowled | 242 |
| Wickets | 4 |
| Bowling average | 34.25 |
| 5 wickets in innings | – |
| 10 wickets in match | – |
| Best bowling | 2/10 |
| Catches/stumpings | 3/– |
- Source: Cricinfo, 13 May 2012

Arthur Taylor (1880 – 13 November 1956) was an English cricketer. Taylor was a right-handed batsman who bowled right-arm medium-fast. He was born at Maltby, Yorkshire.

Despite being born in Yorkshire, it was for Warwickshire that Taylor made his first-class debut for against Sussex at the Bulls Head Ground, Coventry, in the 1913 County Championship. He made five further first-class appearances for the county in that season, the last of which came against Leicestershire at Ashby Road, Hinckley. In his six first-class matches, he scored 83 runs at an average of 9.22, with a high score of 17. With the ball, he took 4 wickets at a bowling average of 34.25, with best figures of 2/10.

Outside of playing, Taylor was also an umpire. He stood in one first-class match between Warwickshire and Worcestershire in 1919. He died at Birmingham, Warwickshire, on 13 November 1956.
