= George Feick =

American architect

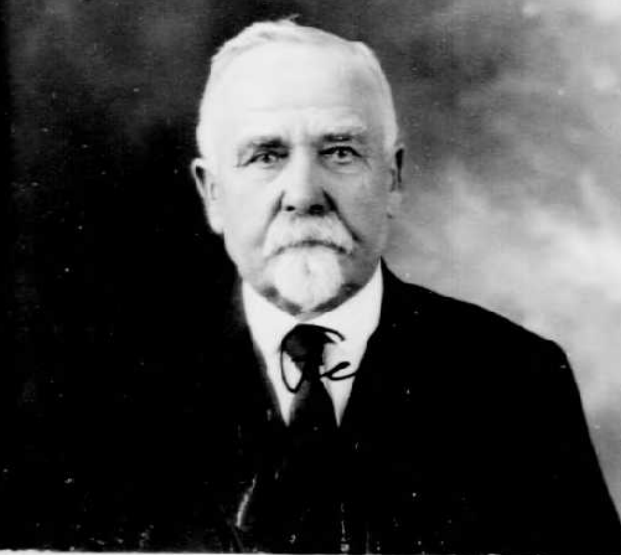
- Born: Johann Georg Feick; January 23, 1849; Steinau, Hesse, Germany
- Died: November 11, 1932 (aged 83); Sandusky, Ohio, United States
- Occupation: Architect

George Feick (January 23, 1849 - November 11, 1932) was a German-American builder in Sandusky and Oberlin, Ohio. His works include the Wyoming State Capitol, multiple buildings at Oberlin College, and numerous office buildings, churches, schools, libraries and residences in and around Sandusky. Several of his works are listed on the National Register of Historic Places.

== Early years ==
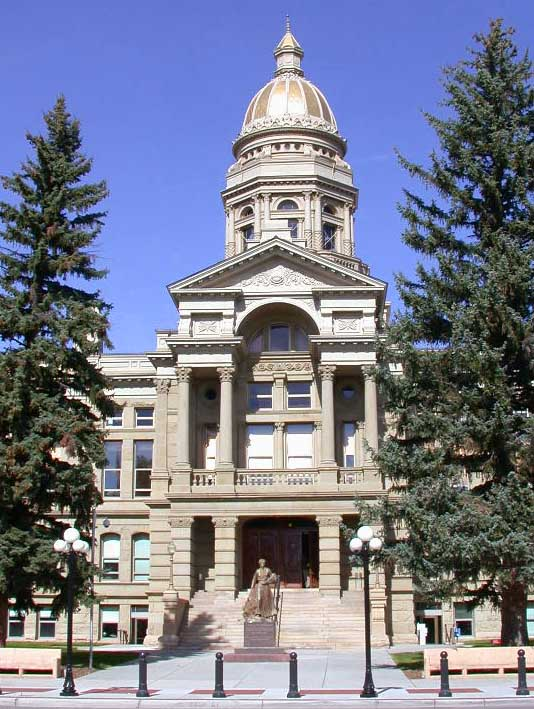
Wyoming State Capitol built in partnership with brother Adam

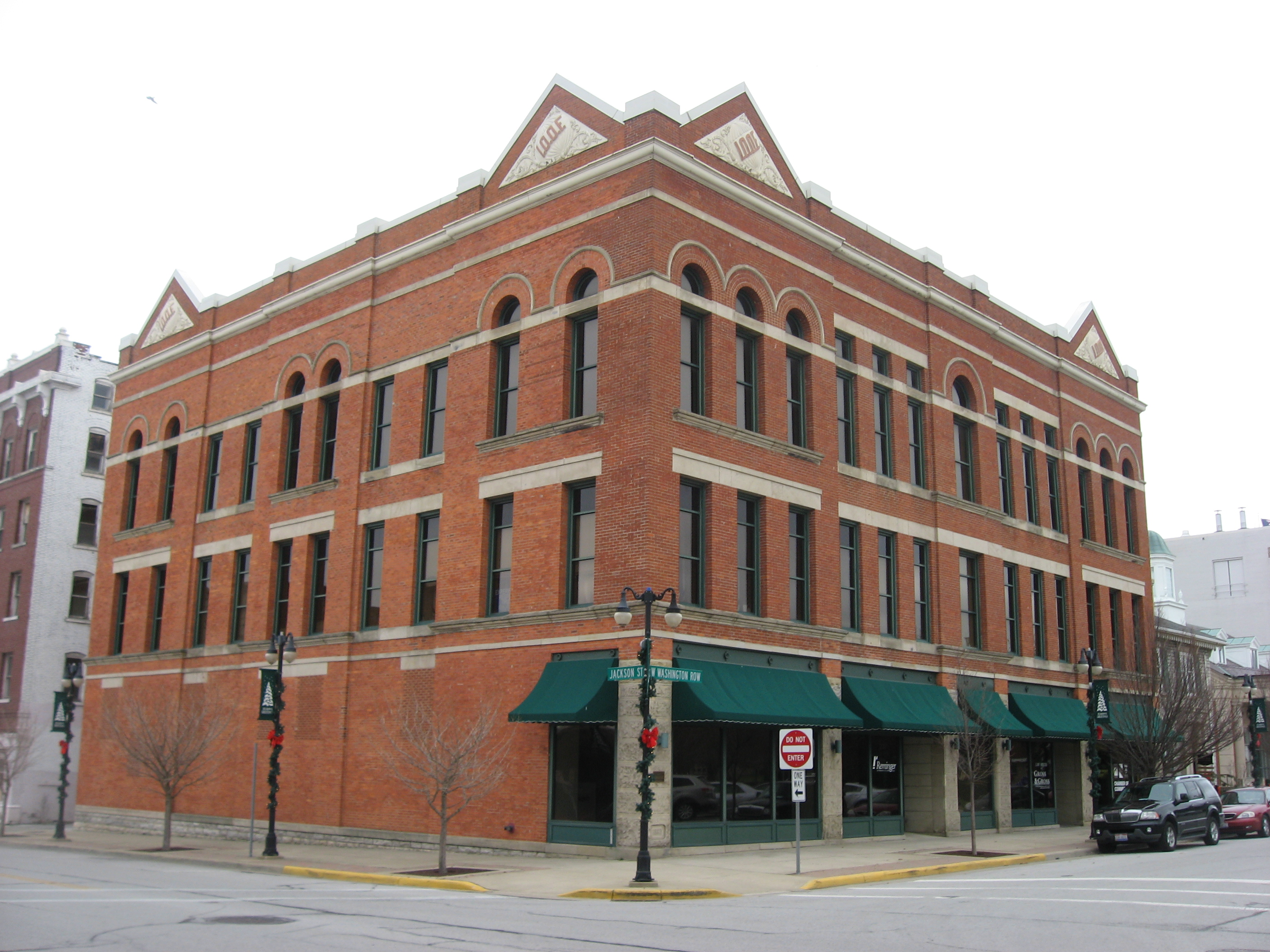
IOOF hall in Sandusky, Ohio

Feick was born in Steinau, Hesse, Germany, in January 1848. After a three-year apprenticeship in the cabinet maker's trade, Feick emigrated to Ohio in June 1866 at age 17. He became a naturalized United States citizen in October 1872.

== Family ==
Feick was married in 1873 to Augusta Ernestine Klotz (1852-1888), a native of Dresden, Saxony, Germany. They had five children: Emil Augustus (born March 20, 1874), Clara Sofia (born May 30, 1877), George, Jr. (born January 25, 1881); Olga Charlotte (born June 20, 1885); and Ernestine (born December 7, 1898). Feick's wife died on December 24, 1888, 17 days after the birth of their fifth child. In June 1892, Feick was remarried to Minnie A. Klotz. Feick and his second wife had one child, Augustus H. (born June 22, 1893).

== Partnership with Adam Feick ==
Feick's older brothers Philip and Adam were the first to immigrate to Sandusky, arriving in 1849 and 1854, respectively. When George Feick arrived in Sandusky in 1866, he began working as a carpenter with brother Adam. In 1872, Adam and George Feick formed a construction partnership known as Adam Feick & Brother. Older brother Philip Feick was also involved in the business for a time. Working under the name Adam Feick & Brother, they built a number of important structures, including the Erie County Jail (1883), the Wyoming State Capitol (1886-1888), Talcott Hall at Oberlin College (1887), the Sandusky Masonic Temple (1888-1890), the Independent Order of Odd Fellows Temple in Sandusky (1889), the Lake Shore and Michigan Southern Railroad Depot (1891), Lord Cottage at Oberlin College (1892), and buildings at the Ohio Soldiers' and Sailors' Home.

== George Feick & Company ==
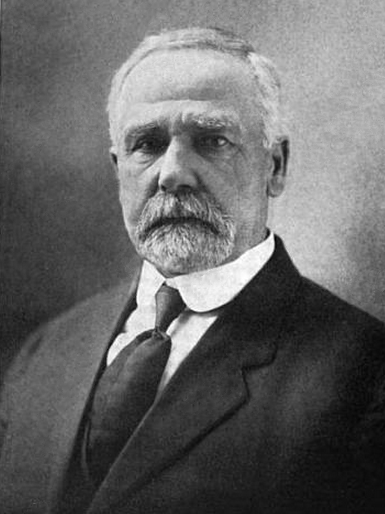
Feick, c. 1916

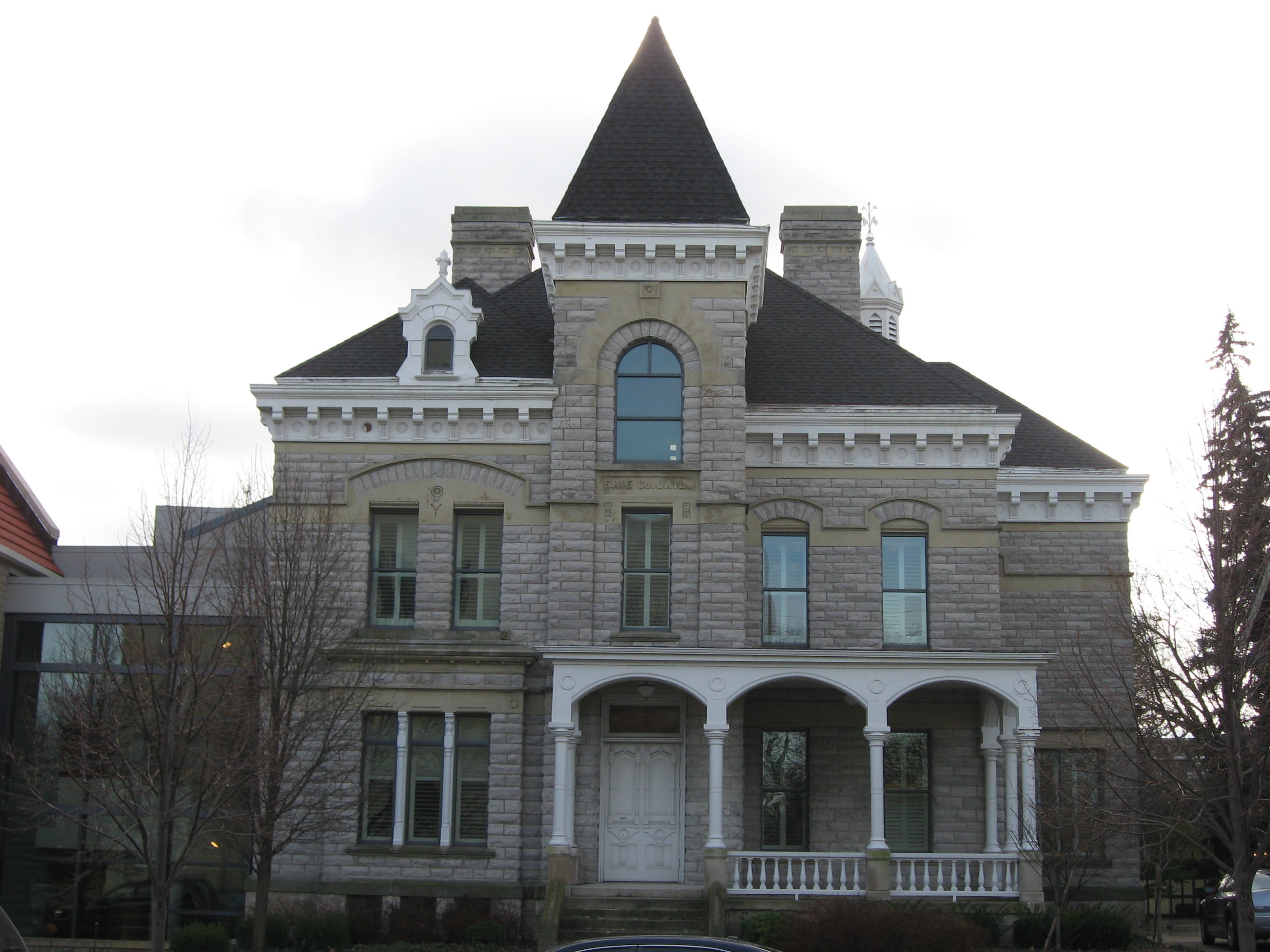
Erie County Jail

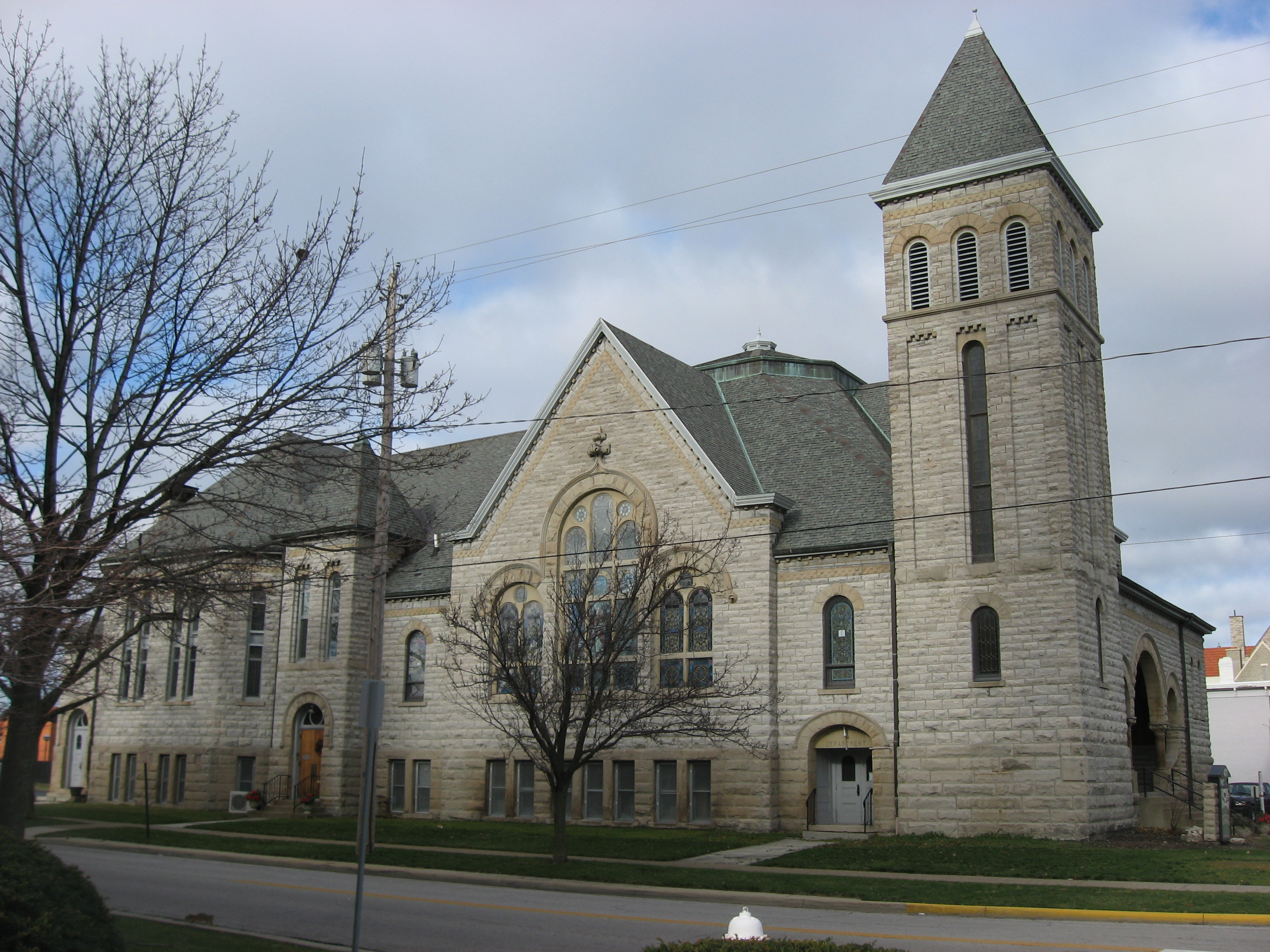
First Congregational Church (Sandusky, Ohio)

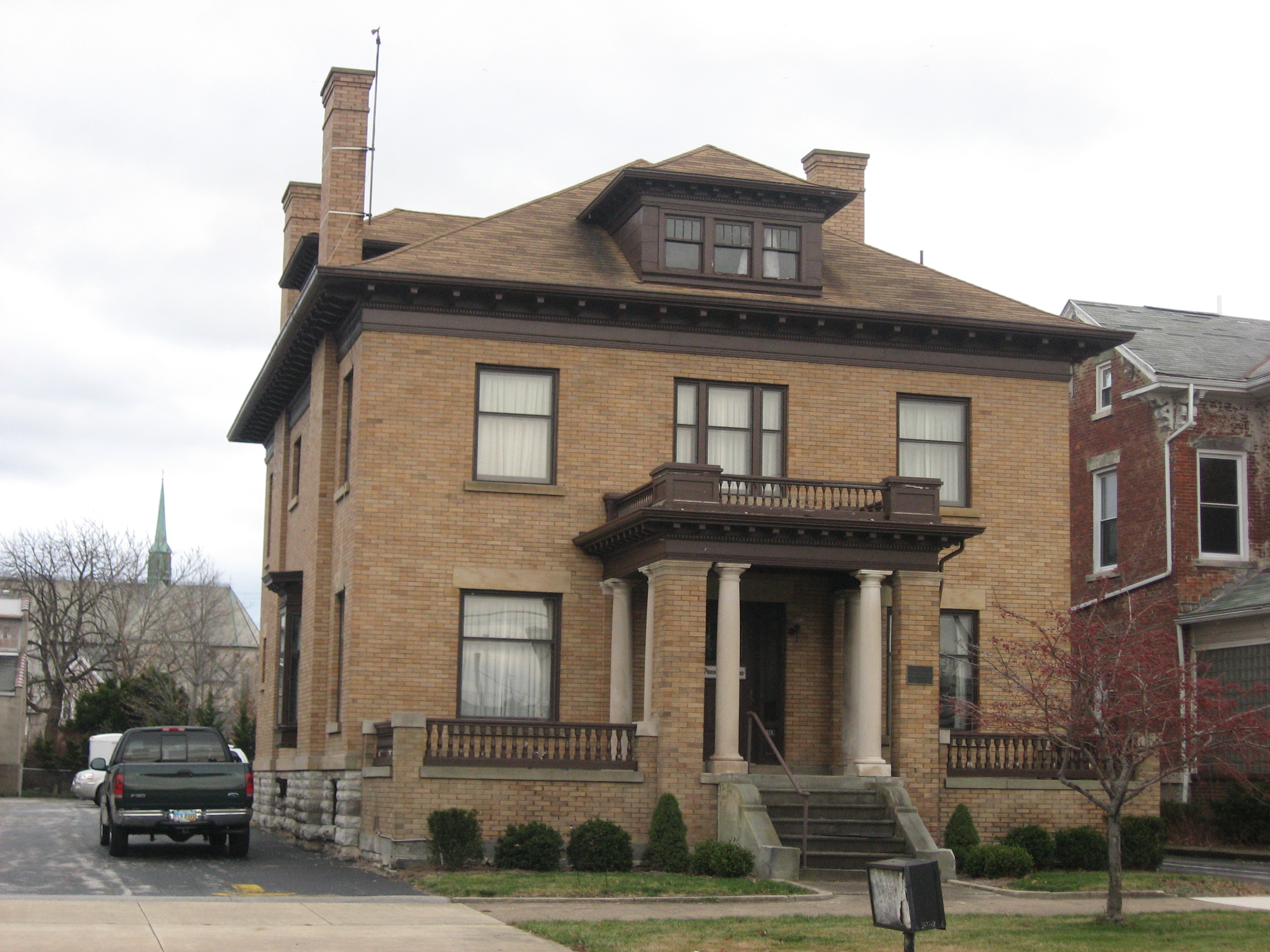
John Mertz House

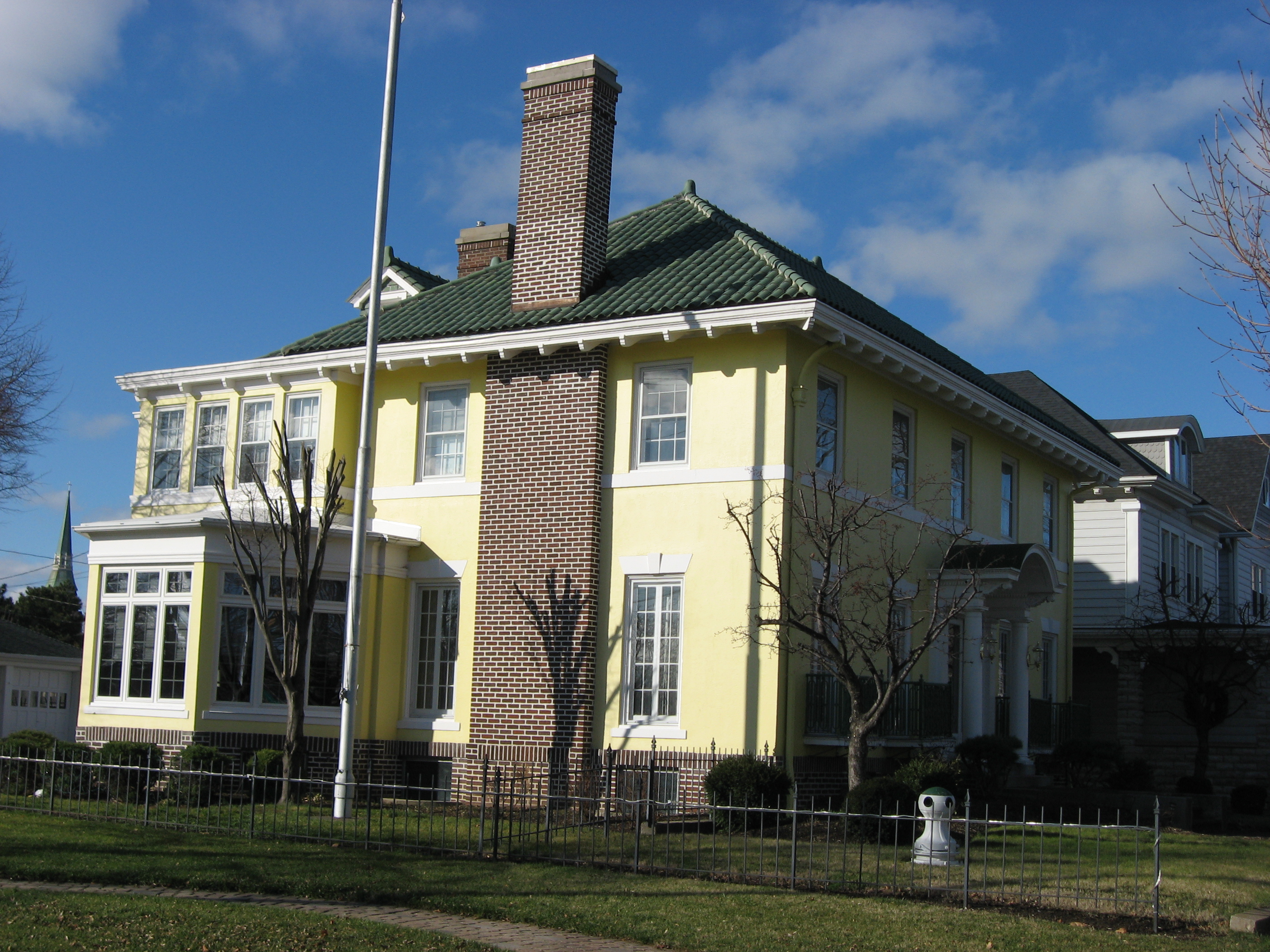
John Stang House

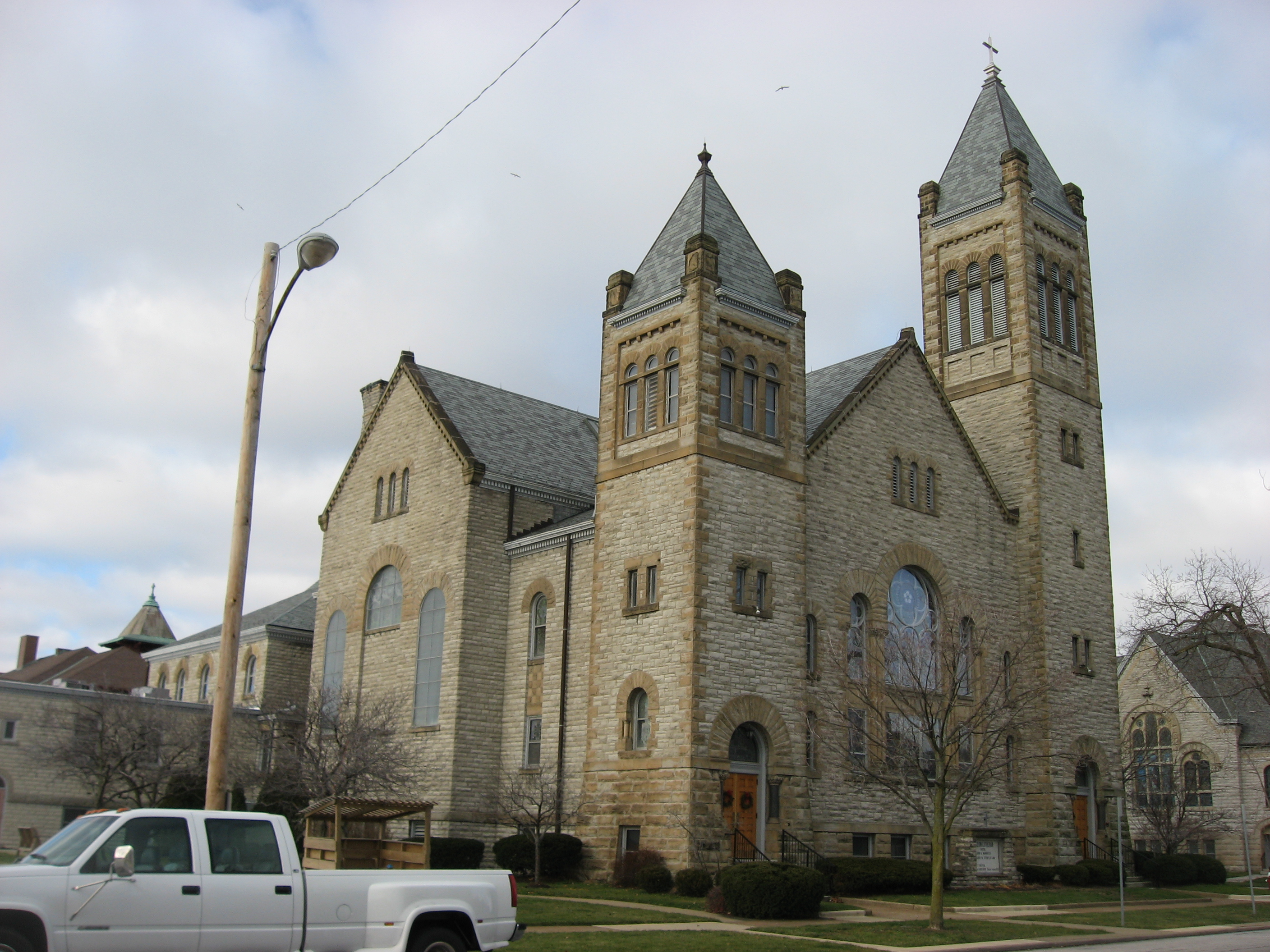
Zion Lutheran Church

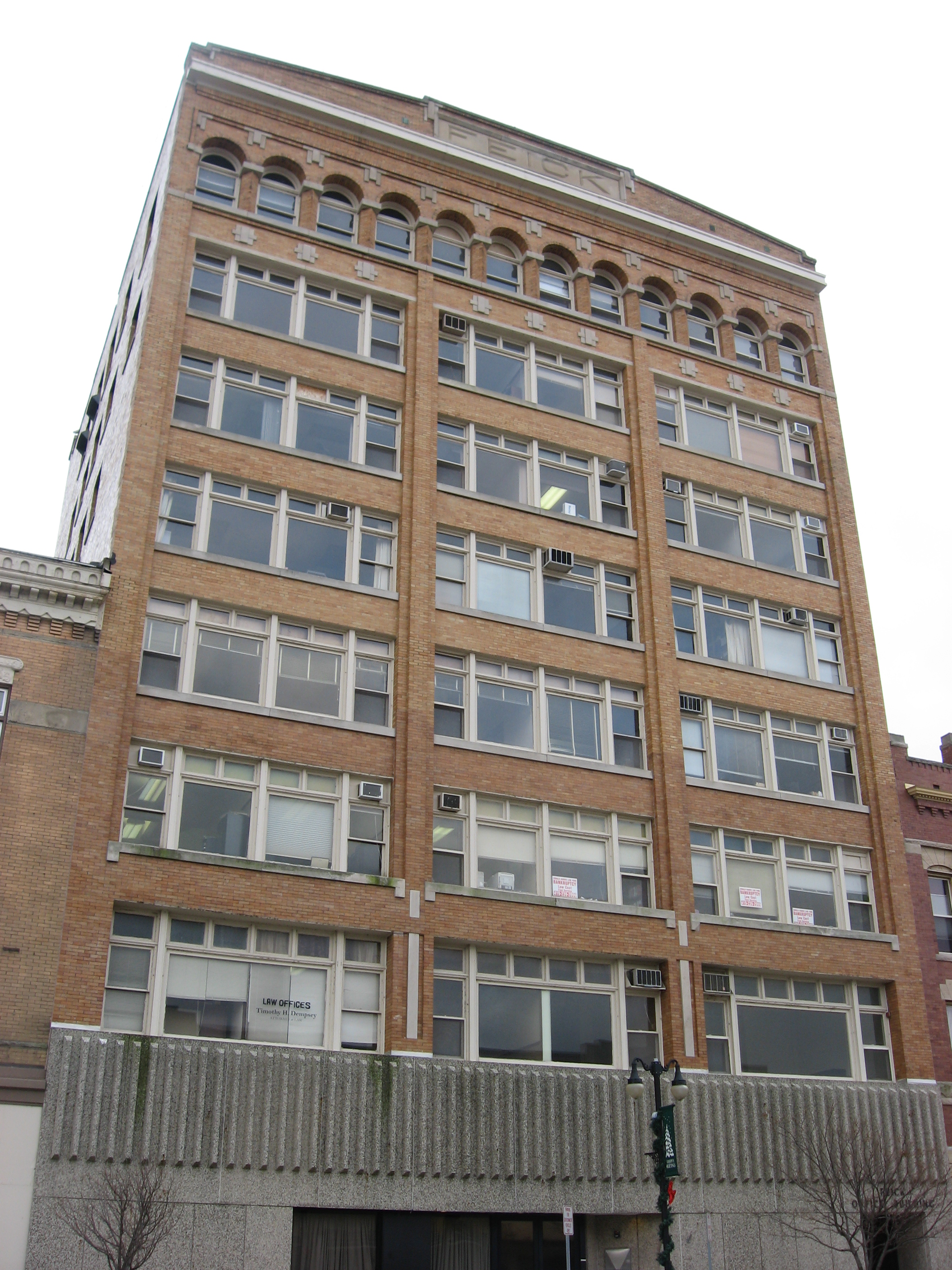
Feick Building in Sandusky

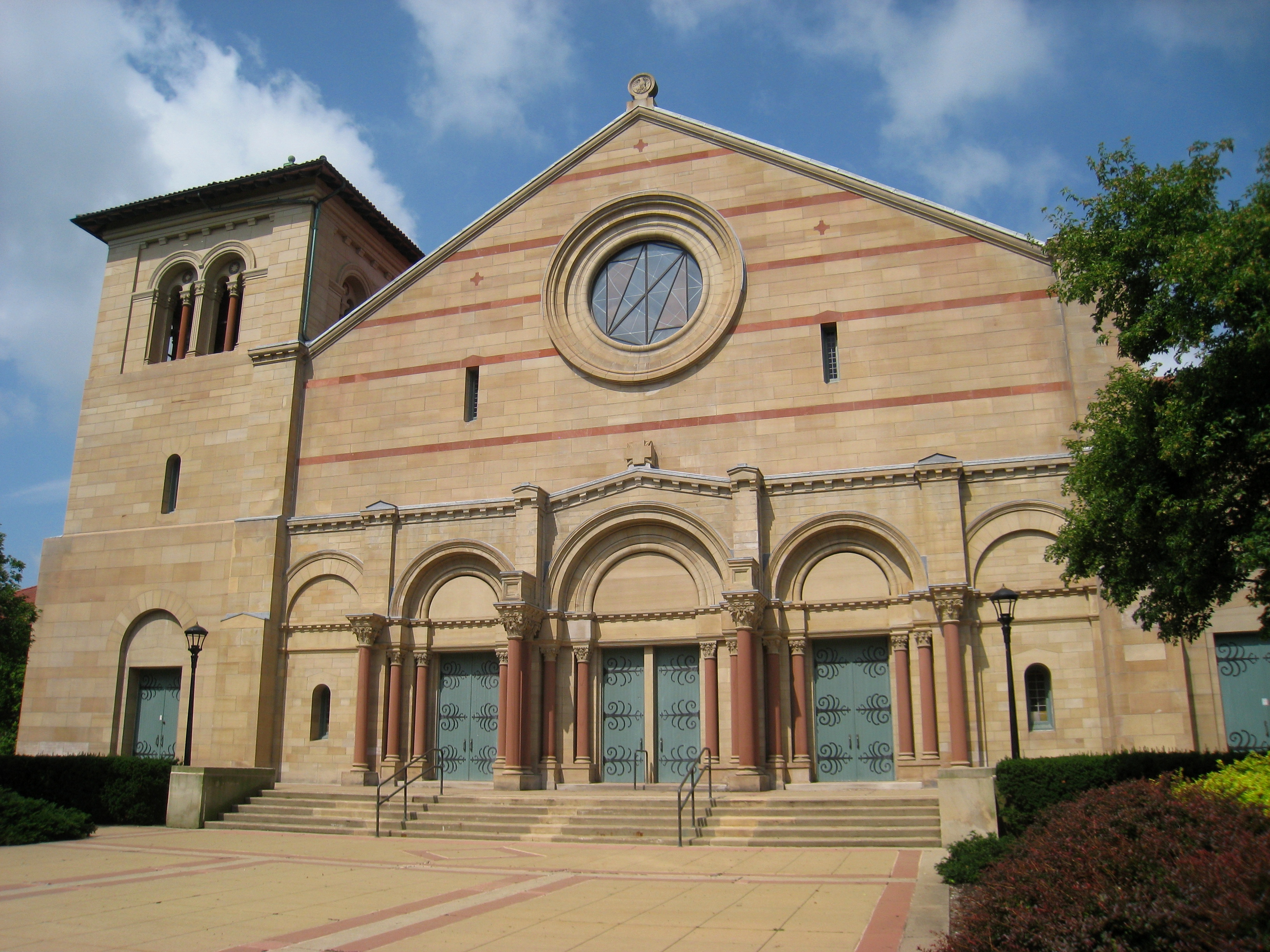
Finney Chapel at Oberlin

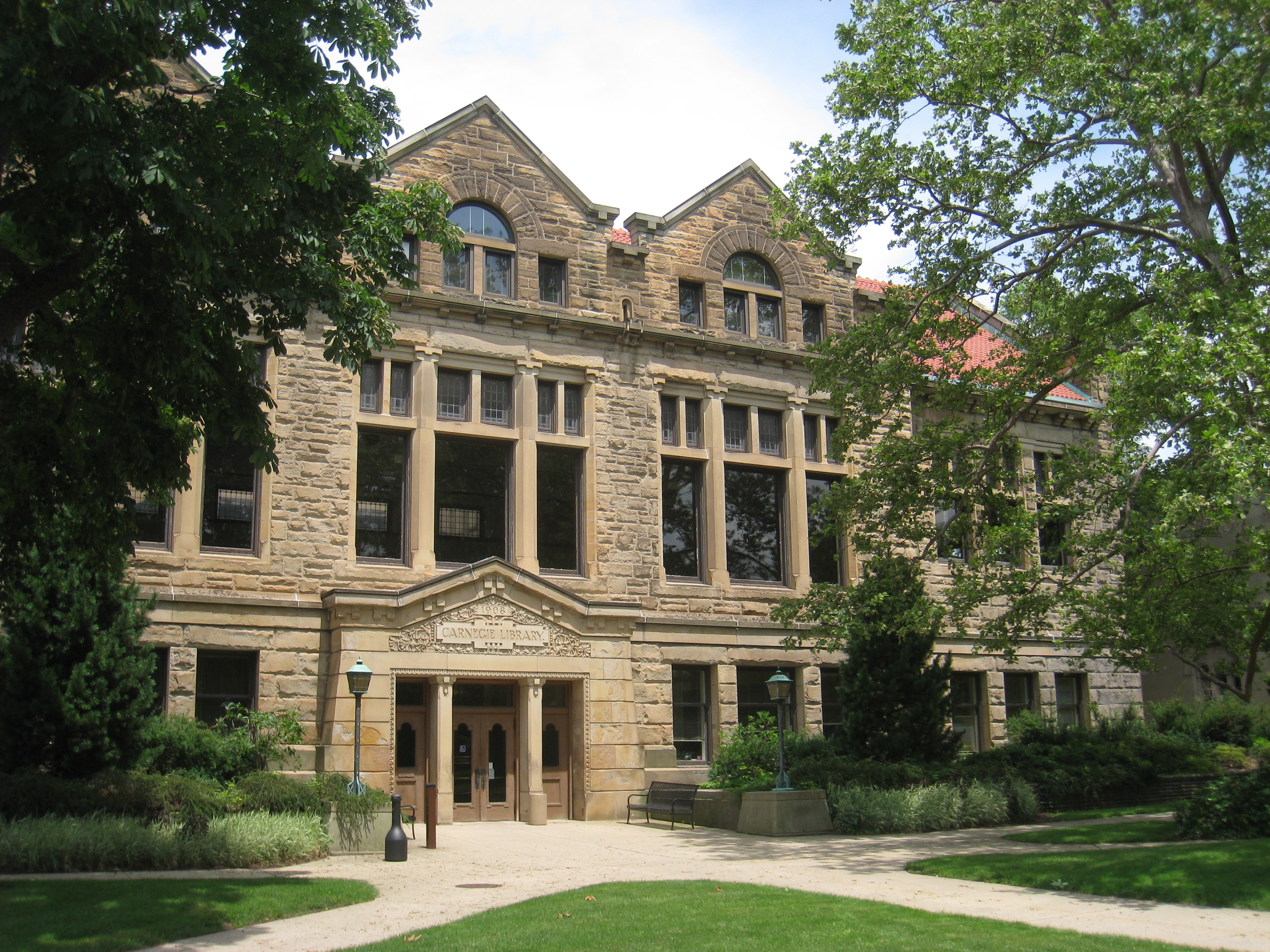
Carnegie Library at Oberlin

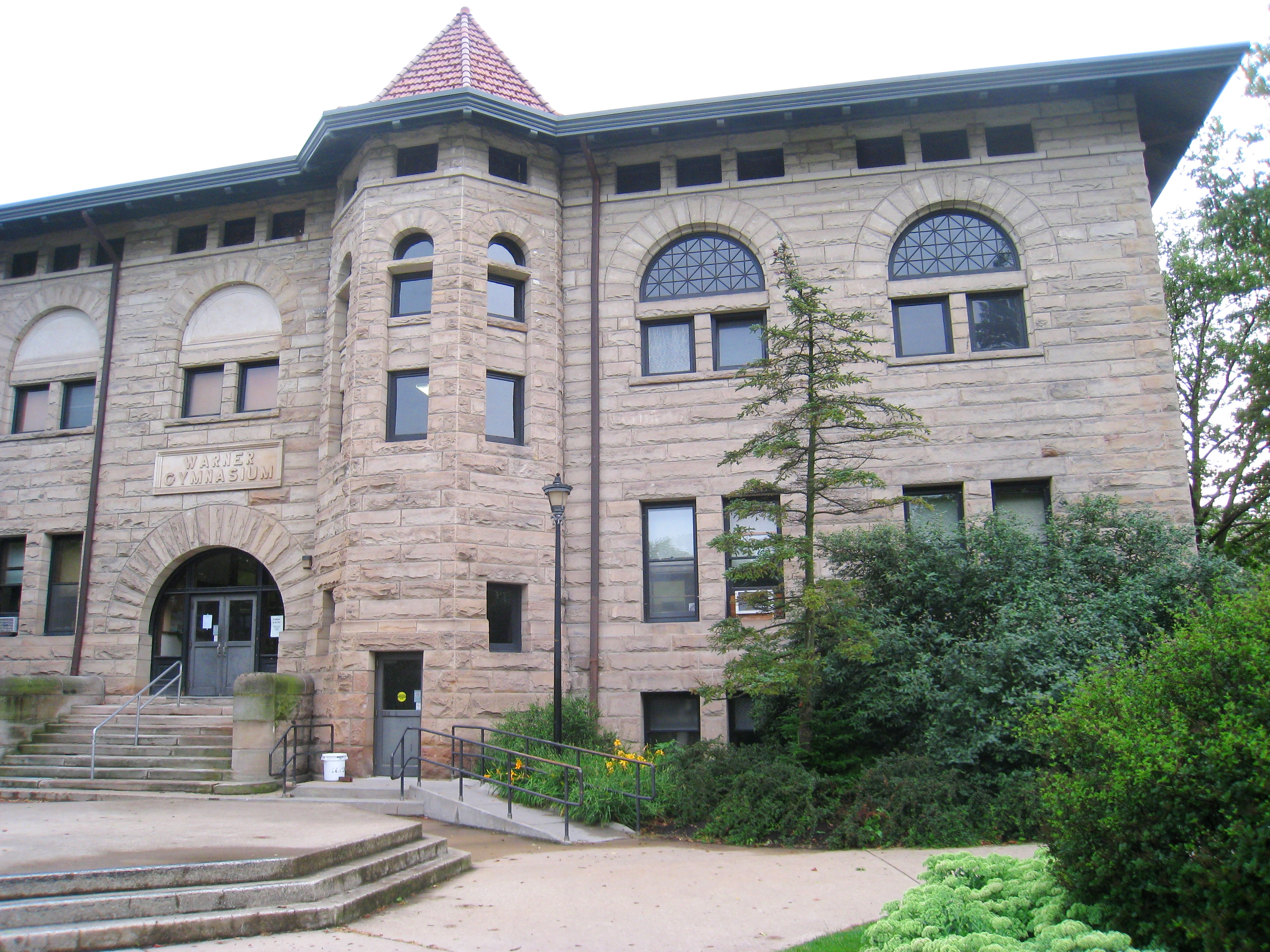
Warner Gymnasium at Oberlin

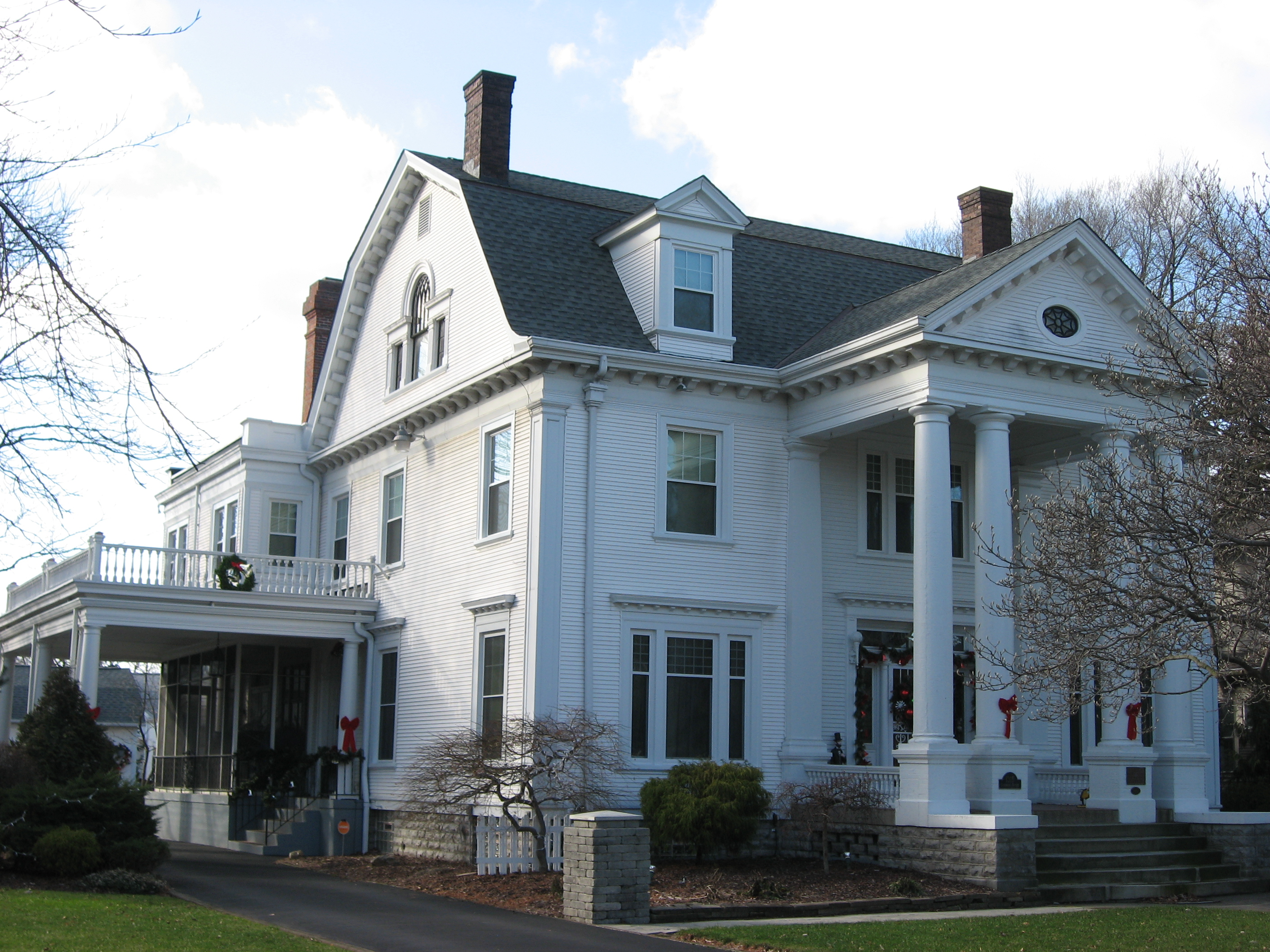
Taylor-Frohman House

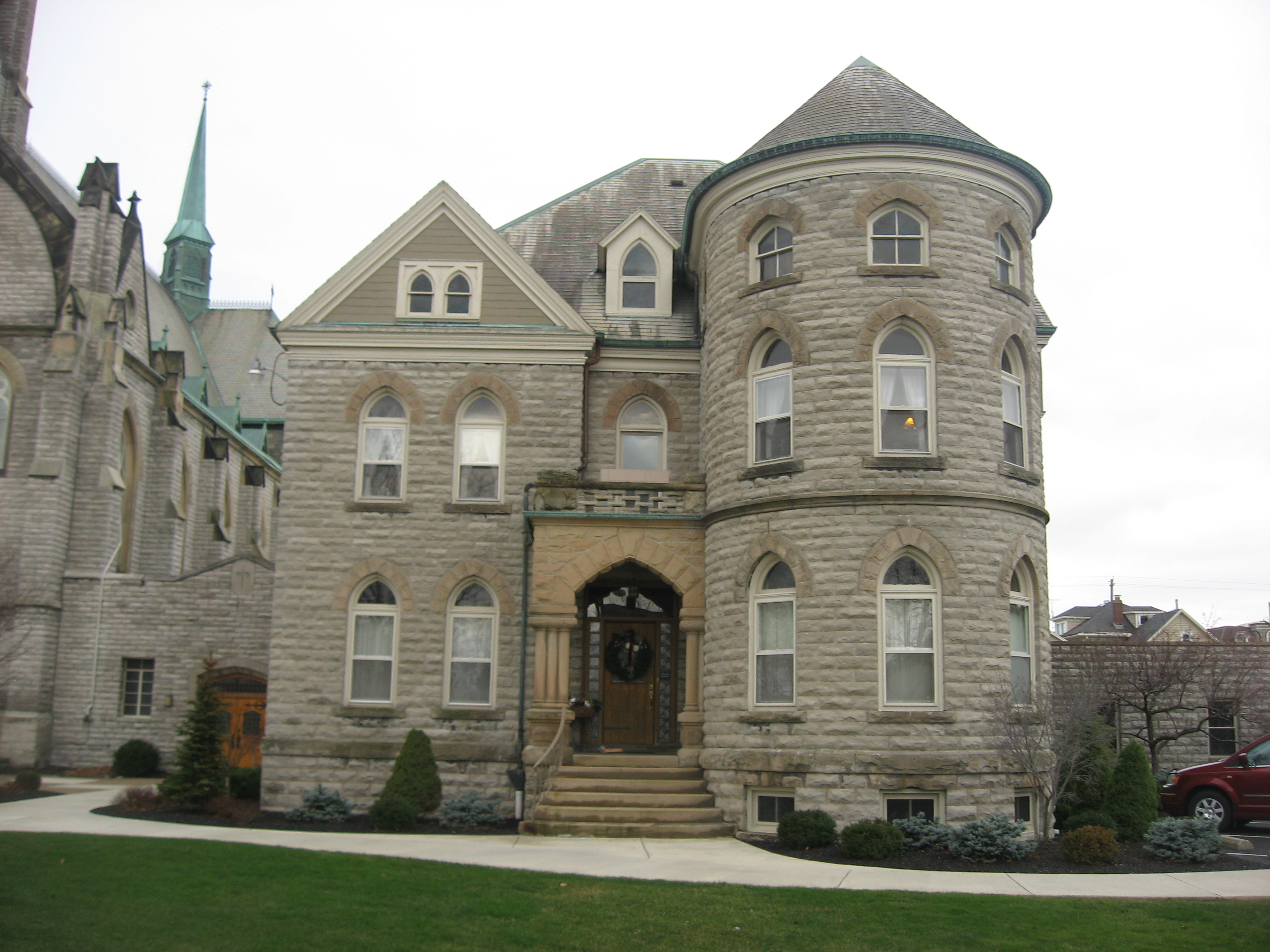
St. Mary's Rectory

When Adam Feick died in 1893, the brothers' construction business became known as George Feick & Company. Adam's son, John Adam Feick, became affiliated with the company at that time. Working with his nephew, Feick continued to build a number of important structures, including First Congregational Church (1895), Zion Lutheran Church (1898), the law building at Ohio State University and three buildings at Oberlin College. In the early 1900s, Feick's sons Emil Augustus and George, Jr., began working in the business, and the company's name was changed to George Feick and Sons. Around this time, nephew John Adam Feick left the business and began operating his own construction business. In 1905, Feick and Sons built the Edwards Gymnasium at Ohio Wesleyan University in Delaware, Ohio. Feick's son, George, Jr., later became an architect in the partnership Purcell, Feick & Elmslie.

Feick built numerous buildings in Sandusky, including commercial buildings in the city's business district, residences, churches and schools. He built Sandusky High School in 1915. In 1916, he built an eight-story office building in downtown Sandusky that is still known as the Feick Building.

Feick had begun doing construction work for Oberlin College while in partnership with brother Adam. Oberlin remained one of Feick's most significant clients for more than 25 years. By 1912, Feick maintained offices in both Sandusky and Oberlin. In addition to the works constructed in partnership with brother Adam, Feick's further work at Oberlin College includes: Severance Chemical Laboratory, built from 1899 to 1901 at a cost of $75,000; Warner Gymnasium, built from 1900 to 1901; Finney Memorial Chappel, built from 1907 to 1908 at a cost of $135,000; the college's Carnegie Library, built from 1907 to 1908 at a cost of $155,600; Rice Memorial Hall, built from 1909 to 1910 at a cost of $110,000; the Men's Building, built from 1909 to 1911 at a cost of $460,000; Keep Cottage, built from 1911 to 1913 at a cost of $45,500; and the Jacob Dolson Cox Administration Building, built from 1913 to 1915.

Feick also built libraries in several communities in northern Ohio, including New London, Milan, Norwalk, Shelby, and Mansfield. He also built the station for the Lake Shore and Michigan Southern Railway in Painesville, Ohio. Other works include the Savings Bank and Mohican blocks at Mansfield, Ohio, the Hotel and Administration Building for the Lakeside Association at Lakeside, Ohio, and the St. Joseph's Church at Marblehead, Ohio. Following his death, the Sandusky newspaper wrote:

In the days of George Feick, the builder was an artist. The stone was hewn to an exactitude ... Men like George Feick, Sr., to whom building was in a way the product of their artistic selves, regret the passing of this phase of building. They miss the beauty put into them.

Several of Feick's works are listed on the National Register of Historic Places.

In addition to his construction business, Feick was also a Mason, a Sandusky city councilman, president of the Sandusky Telephone Company, and a director of the Citizen's Banking Company in Sandusky.

== Later years ==
At the time of the 1920 United States Census, Feick was living at 416 Central Avenue in Sandusky with his wife Minnie and daughter Olga. As of 1922, Feick operated The Geo. Feick and Sons Company at 416 Central Avenue in Sandusky.

At the time of the 1930 United States Census, Feick was still living at 416 Central Avenue in Sandusky with his wife Minnie.

Feick died in November 1932 at his home in Sandusky. He was buried in the Feick family crypt at the Oakland cemetery.

== List of works ==
Feick's works include (with attribution as given in source):

- Edwards Gymnasium/Pfieffer Natatorium, built in 1905, on Ohio Wesleyan University's Main Campus, S. Sandusky Street, Delaware, Ohio (Feick & Son), NRHP-listed
- Erie County Infirmary, built 1886, south of Sandusky on Columbus Road, Sandusky, Ohio (Feick, George Phillip), NRHP-listed
- Erie County Jail, built 1883, at 204 West Adams Street, Sandusky, Ohio (Philip, Adam & George Feick), NRHP-listed
- Feick Building, built 1909, at 158-160 E. Market St., Sandusky, Ohio (Purcell & Feick), NRHP-listed
- First Congregational Church, built in 1895, at 431 Columbus Avenue, Sandusky, Ohio (Feick, George), NRHP-listed
- Lake Shore and Michigan Southern Railroad Depot, built 1891, at N. Depot at Carr St. Sandusky, Ohio (A. Feick & Bros.), NRHP-listed
- Independent Order of Odd Fellows Temple, built in 1889, at 231 West Washington Row, Sandusky, Ohio (Feick, George, Adam and Philip), NRHP-listed
- John Mertz House, built in 1909, at 610 West Washington St., Sandusky, Ohio (Feick, George), NRHP-listed
- St. Mary's Rectory, built 1893, 429 Central Ave., Sandusky, Ohio (Feick, George), NRHP-listed
- John Stang House, built 1922, at 629 Columbus Avenue, Sandusky, Ohio (Feick, George), NRHP-listed
- Taylor-Frohman House, built 1906, at 1315 Columbus Avenue, Sandusky, Ohio (Feick, George), NRHP-listed
- Wyoming State Capitol and Grounds, built 1886, at 24th St. and Capitol Ave. Cheyenne, Wyoming (Feick, Adam & Bro.), NRHP-listed
- Zion Lutheran Church, built 1898, at 501-503 Columbus Avenue, Sandusky, Ohio (Feick, George), NRHP-listed
