= Arthur Taylor House (Paris, Idaho) =

Historic house in Idaho, United States

- U.S. National Register of Historic Places
- Location within Idaho Location within the United States
- Location: W. 2nd, North, Paris, Idaho
- Coordinates: 42°13′54″N 111°24′22″W
- Built: 1890
- Architect: Taylor, Arthur
- MPS: Paris MRA
- NRHP reference No.: 82000312
- Added to NRHP: November 18, 1982

Arthur Taylor House in Paris, Idaho was built in 1890. It was listed on the National Register of Historic Places in 1982.
