= George Taylor Jr. House =

Historic house in Utah, United States

- U.S. National Register of Historic Places
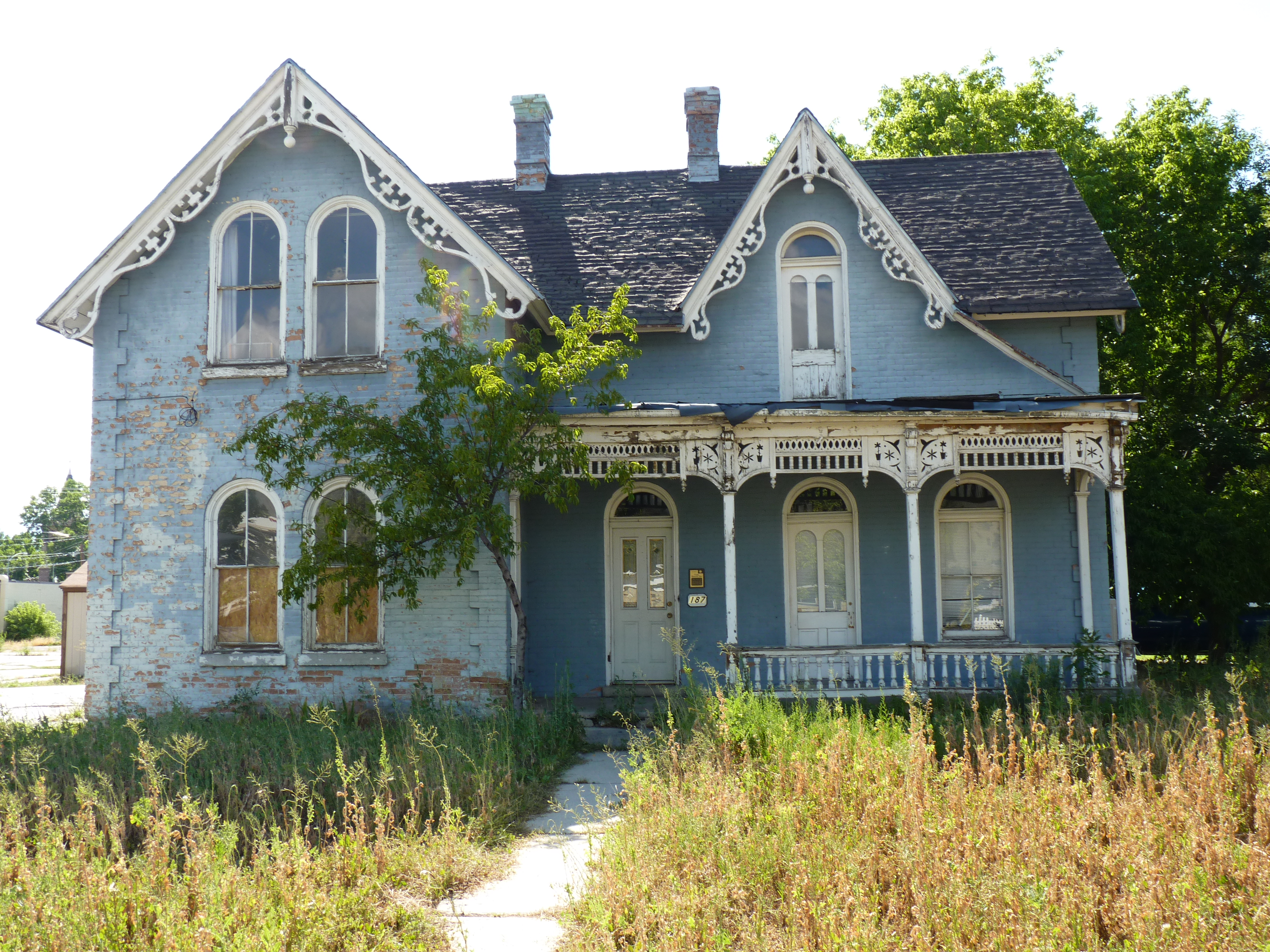
- George Taylor House

- Location within Utah Location within the United States
- Location: 187 North 400 West; Provo, Utah; United States
- Coordinates: 40°14′6″N 111°39′54″W
- Area: less than one acre
- Built: 1885
- Architectural style: Gothic Revival, Cross-wing
- NRHP reference No.: 83004185
- Added to NRHP: August 9, 1983

The George Taylor Jr. House is a historic house located at 187 North 400 West in Provo, Utah, United States. It is listed on the National Register of Historic Places.

This house was built in the 1880s. This house was designated to the Provo City Landmarks register on August 22, 1995.

== George Taylor Jr ==
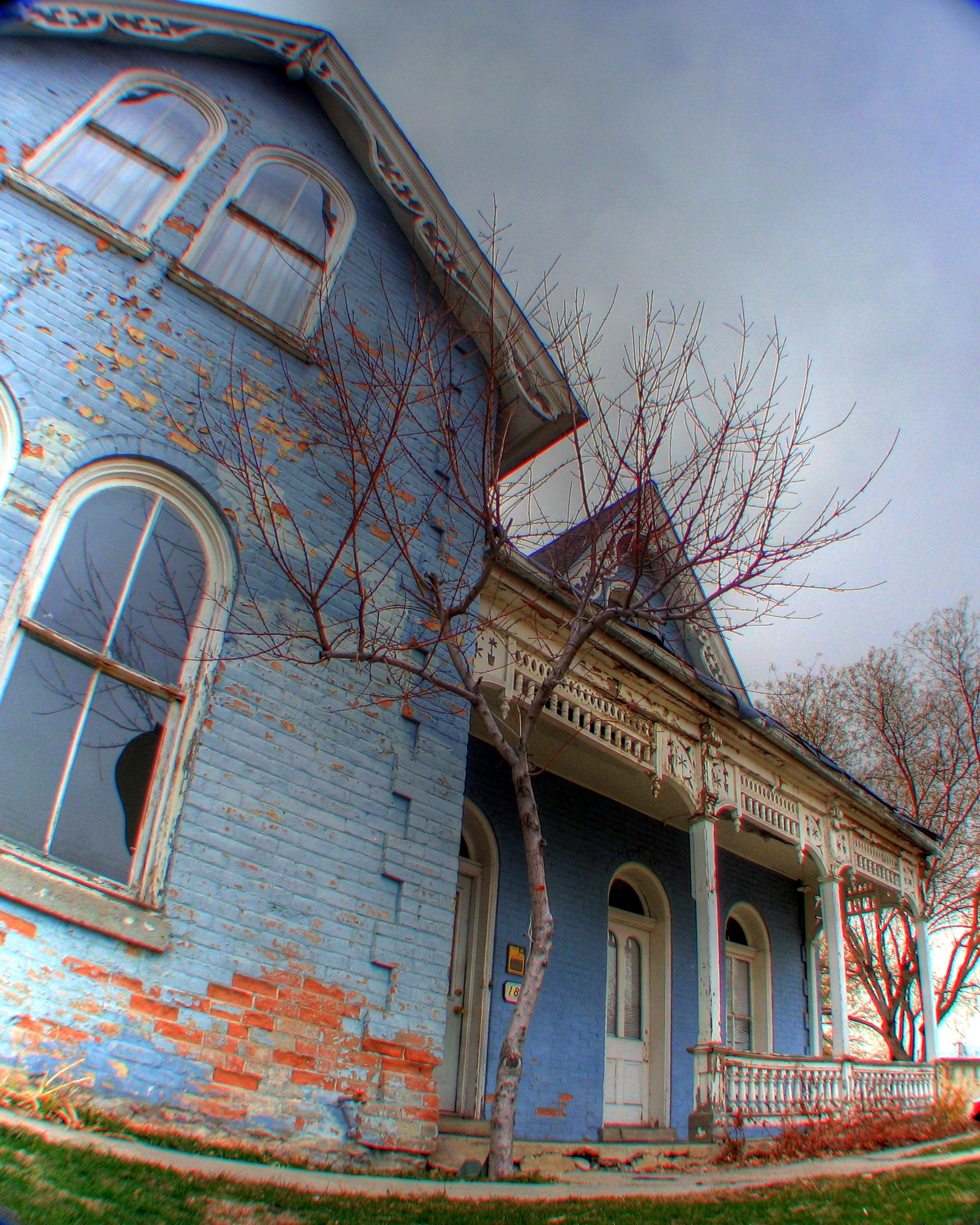

George Taylor Jr. was born on August 31, 1864, in Provo, Utah. His father, George Taylor Sr., had founded the Taylor furniture store in 1866, which was the first furniture store in Provo. The business became incorporated in 1890 as the Taylor Brothers Company. George Jr. served as vice president and Eliza Taylor served as president. As the corporation grew, Taylor Brothers Company became the first big department store in Provo. In December 1814, George Taylor Jr., married Sarah Elizabeth Thomas in Manti. He built this home with the help of his father-in-law, a mason. The home was sold to Joseph F. Andrew in 1891, who in turn sold it in 1894 to Joseph D. Jones, a probate judge and entrepreneur. Jones sold the house to John D. Dixon in 1899, where the ownership remained until 1906 when James E. Hosmer attained the home. Hosmer sold the house to Eliza N. Taylor, and she sold it to her son George who returned in 1909 to live there until he died in December 1941. The house presently remains in the Taylor family and is rented as offices.

In 2012, restoration work was begun on the home in conjunction with Habitat for Humanity and on November 20, 2014, a ribbon cutting ceremony was held for the finished home.

It was listed on the National Register of Historic Places in 1983.

== See also ==
- National Register of Historic Places listings in Utah County, Utah
