= William Taylor House (Middleport, New York) =

Historic house in New York, United States

- U.S. National Register of Historic Places
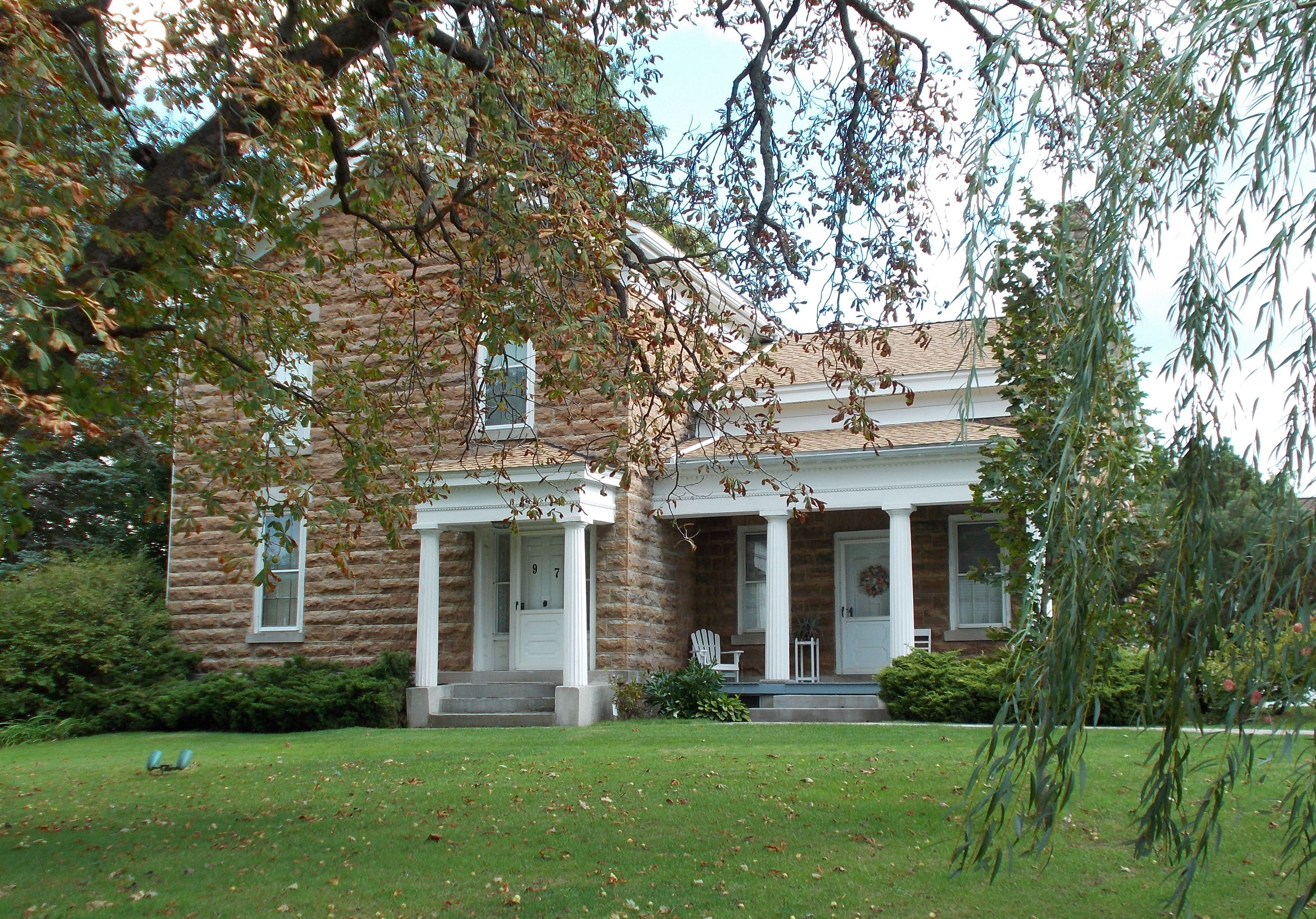
- William Taylor House, September 2012

- Location within New York Location within the United States
- Location: 97 S. Main St., Middleport, New York
- Coordinates: 43°12′22″N 78°28′36″W
- Area: 0.85 acres (0.34 ha)
- Built: c. 1830, 1871
- Architectural style: Greek Revival
- NRHP reference No.: 12000998
- Added to NRHP: December 4, 2012

William Taylor House is a historic home located at Middleport in Niagara County, New York. The main block was built about 1830, and is a two-story, L-shaped Medina sandstone dwelling in the Greek Revival style with a 1 1/2-story side wing. It sits on a limestone foundation and has a two-story, stone and clapboard addition built in 1871. It features doors accented by porches supported by Doric order columns.

It was listed on the National Register of Historic Places in 2012.
