= George Taylor House (Corvallis, Oregon) =

Historic house in Oregon, United States

- U.S. National Register of Historic Places
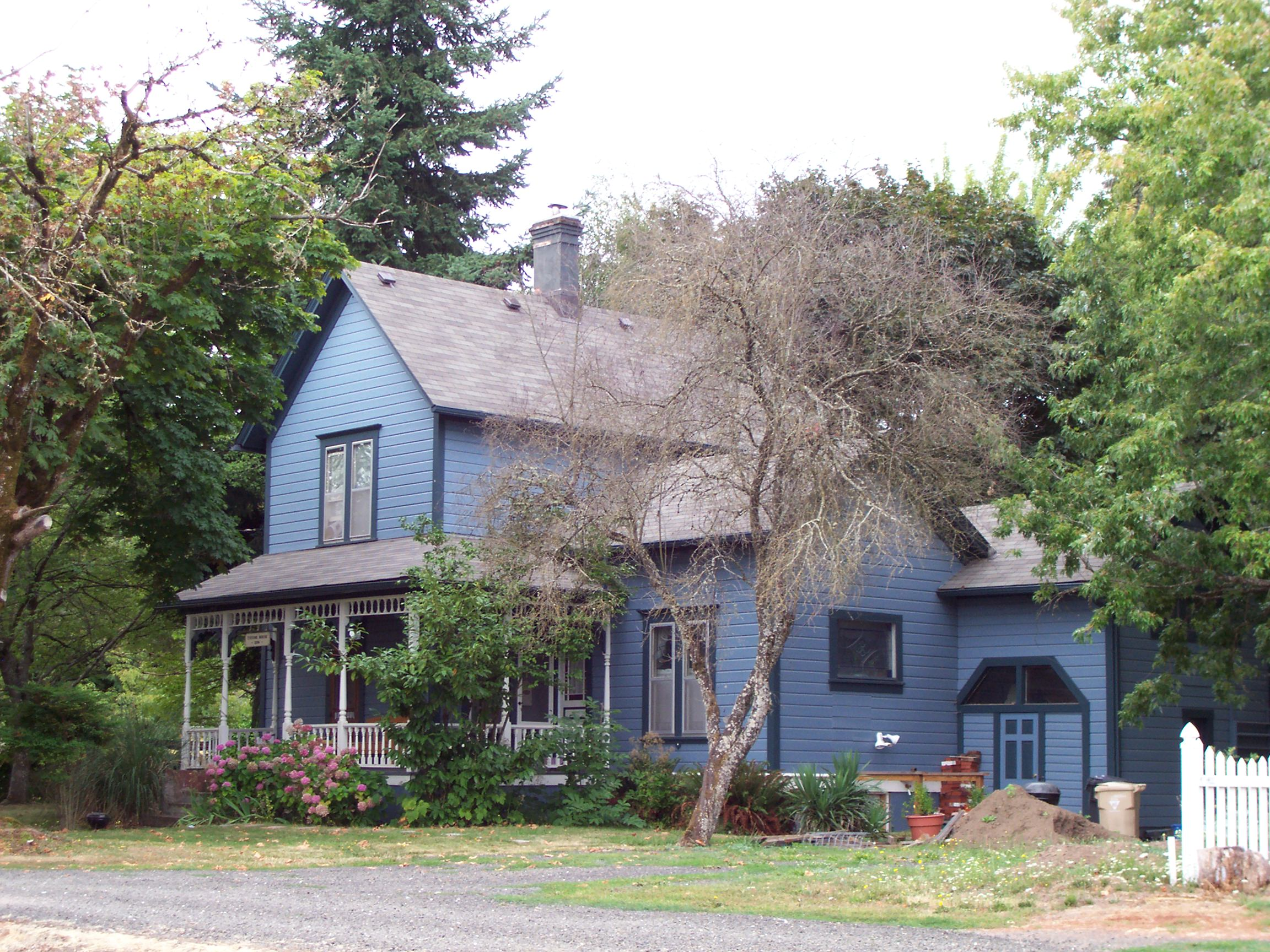

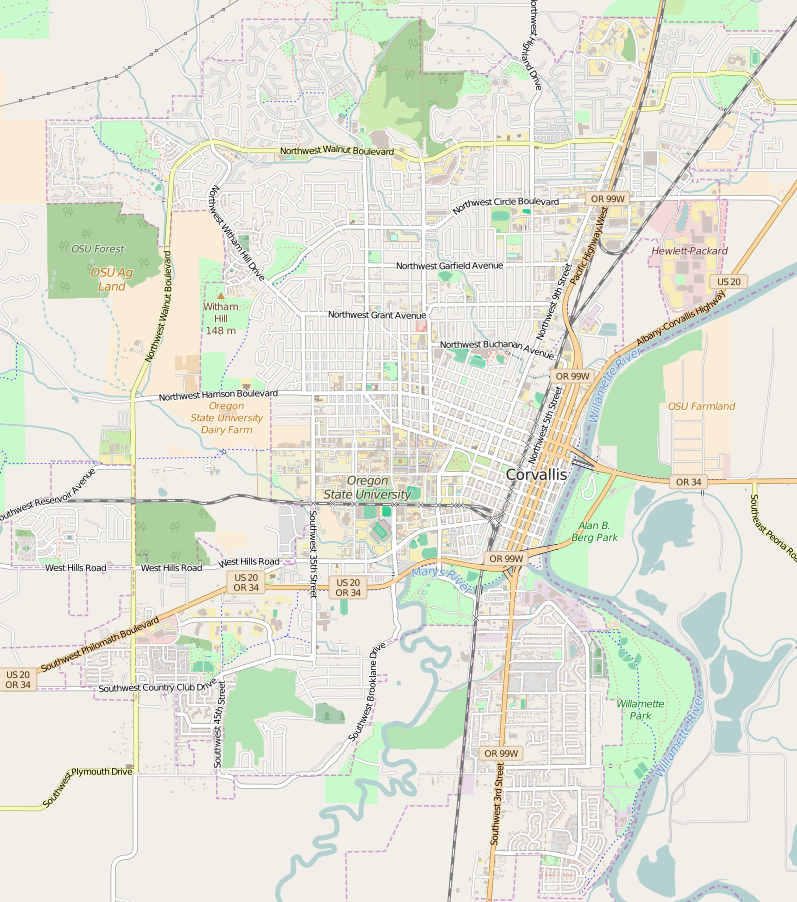
- Location within Corvallis OR Location within Oregon
- Location: 504 NW 6th St., Corvallis, Oregon
- Coordinates: 44°34′10″N 123°15′39″W
- Built: 1896
- Architectural style: Rural Gothic
- NRHP reference No.: 81000476
- Added to NRHP: December 9, 1981

The George Taylor House in Corvallis, Oregon was built in 1900. It is also known as Oliver House. It was listed on the U.S. National Register of Historic Places in 1981.

According to the City of Corvallis, the address is 504 NW 6th Street, and it was built in 1900 not in 1896 as was reported in a previous application document.
