= George Taylor House (Freehold Borough, New Jersey) =

Historic house in New Jersey, United States

- U.S. National Register of Historic Places
- New Jersey Register of Historic Places
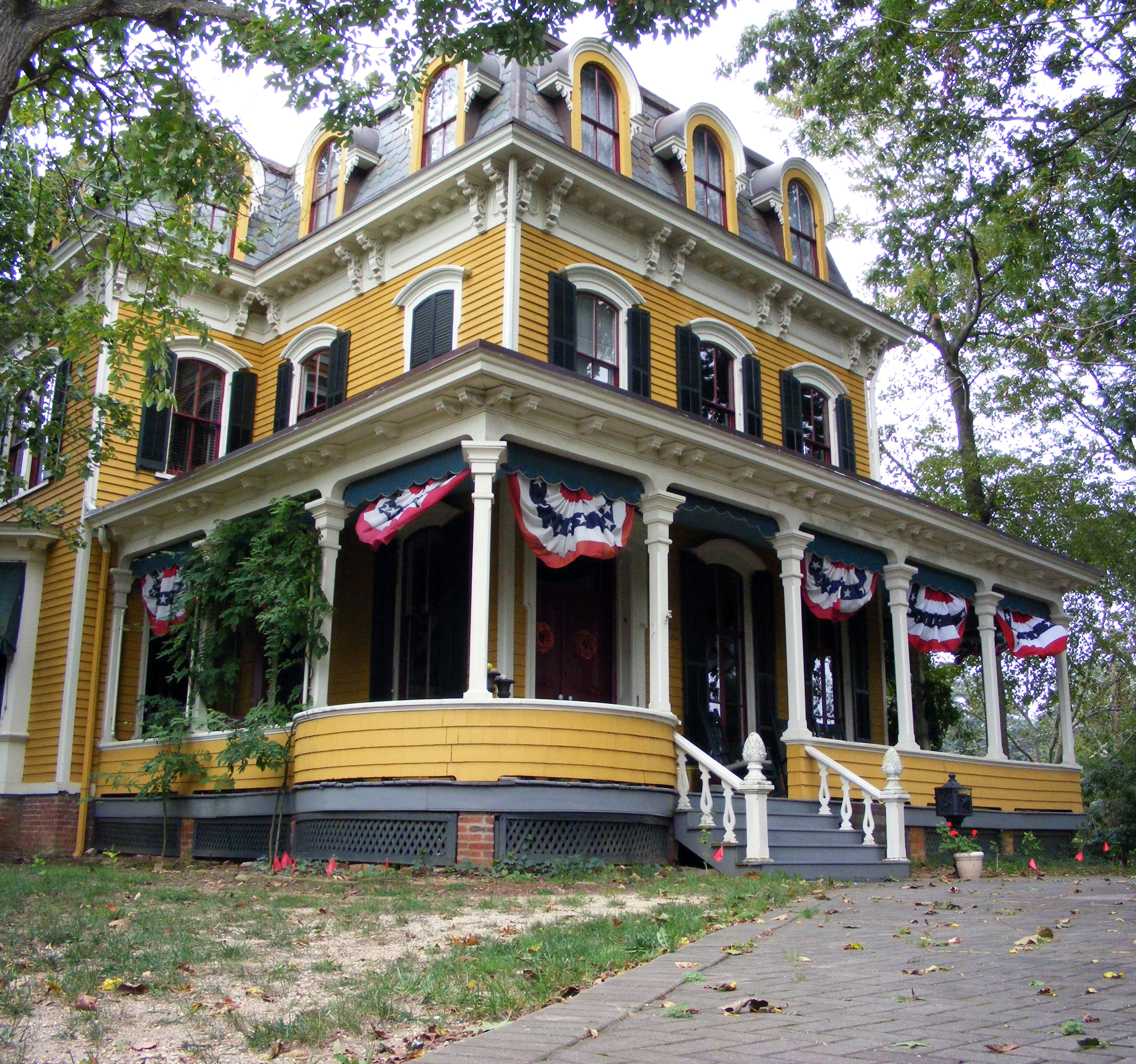

- Location within Monmouth County, New Jersey Location within New Jersey Location within the United States
- Location: 74 Broadway, Freehold, New Jersey, United States
- Coordinates: 40°16′3″N 74°16′2″W
- Area: 1.66 acres (0.67 ha)
- Built: c. 1870
- Architect: George Taylor
- Architectural style: Colonial Revival, Victorian
- NRHP reference No.: 94000392
- NJRHP No.: 1994

Significant dates
- Added to NRHP: April 29, 1994
- Designated NJRHP: March 14, 1994

George Taylor House is in Freehold Borough, Monmouth County, New Jersey, United States on the corner of Broadway and Dutch Lane Road across from Freehold High School. The house was built in circa 1870 by George Taylor, the son of John G. Taylor and Cary Conover Taylor. John G. Taylor was of Scottish ancestry, while Cary Conover was of Dutch ancestry. John G. Taylor was the proprietor of Taylors Mills (in nearby Manalapan, where its namesake continues today), a successful family business that George continued to run in his father's footsteps. The grist mill was successful during the mid-late 19th century, as new markets were opening up with the advent of extensive railroad networks.

Well prior to the Taylors building this house in the 1800s, the property in which the house occupied had been established as early as the 1680s, when English, Dutch, and Scottish settlers began to inhabit the region. The Monmouth Tract was a patent granted by Colonel Richard Nicolls in 1665 to twelve men, most of whom were religious dissenters from Long Island and New England. In 1693, along with Middletown and Shrewsbury, Freehold was established by act of legislature as one of the three original townships in Monmouth County. The name of the township comes from the word freehold, an English legal term describing fee simple property ownership. Early records show that John Bowne was the first to have the deed to the 1,000-acre property, which was granted to him by Deputy-Governor Gawen Lawrie. The land was then sold to six Dutchmen in 1699, Garrett Stoothoff, Garrett Wyckoff, John Wyckoff, Derrick von Sutvant, Peter Couwenhoven, and Jacob Tysen (hence the namesake of Dutch Lane Road, where the house is located).

By the Revolutionary period, the property where the house would eventually occupy had experienced some heavy action during the American Revolutionary War. It was on William Wyckoff's holding of the property, which was where he had established a farmstead in the location where the George Taylor House would eventually be constructed, was where the first shots were fired in the much larger Battle of Monmouth. While much of the action took place where Monmouth Battlefield currently is, the area where the house occupied was where the British had placed batteries (near the greater "Briar Hill" region).

George Taylor purchased the property from his father in 1865, a 48 1/2 parcel of land by that point. The house was built in the second-empire architecture of its day. With the home having three stories, the building structure allows for the exterior of the house to have a three-bay facade with flanking bay windows, a slightly distorted symmetrical layout in the rear, French style doors on the side of the house (including by the porch), full cellar and brick foundational walls, extensive brickwork, and other exquisite features from that era that has allowed the home to standout in the community. The historical significance of the property and the beautiful aesthetic nature of the home itself, led to the home being listed on the National Register of Historic Places in 1994. The home has been in private ownership, from the Taylors to the ownership of William Hunt DuBois and Ellie DuBois from 1897 to 1906, Frank Pierce Jones and Ida Jones from 1906 to 1943 (whom operated a successful farmstead through the agricultural crash of the 1920s and 1930s), Clifford Hance from 1943 to 1951 (a descendant of John Hance from Shrewsbury, a prominent family in Monmouth County since the colonial period), among other owners. However, during the mid 20th century the home began to be neglected, due to rapid suburban development in the surrounding area and simultaneous urban decay (in large part due to the A & M Karagheusian rug mill's closure in the 1960s). However, in the 1980s homeowners Gary and Deborah Duerksen began to restore the home to its pristine appearance from the time period it originated. As of now, while the home continues to be privately owned, it now offers a great glimpse into the borough's Gilded Age past.
