= School Districts of Huron County, Ohio =

School district in Ohio

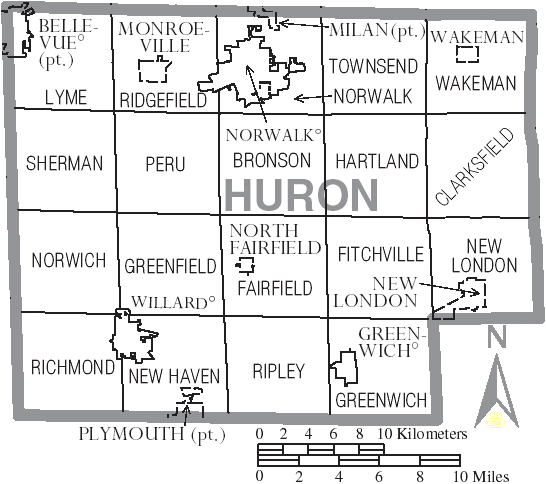
Map of Huron County, Ohio With Municipal and Township Labels

Numerous public school districts and numerous private schools exist in Huron County, Ohio, United States.

All or part of thirteen school districts serve Huron County and its residents (serving grades PK through 12):

- Bellevue City School District: including parts of Bellevue, Lyme Township, and Sherman Township.
- Berlin-Milan Local School District: including parts of Milan, Norwalk, and Norwalk Township.
- Buckeye Central Local School District: including parts of Richmond Township.
- Firelands Local School District: including parts of Wakeman Township.
- Monroeville Local School District: including parts of Monroeville, Norwalk, Bronson Township, Lyme Township, Norwalk Township, Peru Township, and Ridgefield Township.
- New London Local School District: including parts of New London, Clarksfield Township, Fairfield Township, Fitchville Township, Hartland Township, and New London Township.
- Norwalk City School District: including parts of Norwalk, Bronson Township, and Norwalk Township.
- Plymouth-Shiloh Local School District: including parts of Plymouth and New Haven Township.
- Seneca East Local School District: including parts of Norwich Township, Richmond Township, and Sherman Township.
- South Central Local School District: including parts of Greenwich, North Fairfield, Fairfield Township, Greenfield Township, Greenwich Township, and Ripley Township.
- Wellington Exempted Village School District: including parts of Clarksfield Township.
- Western Reserve Local School District: including parts of Norwalk, Wakeman, Bronson Township, Clarksfield Township, Hartland Township, Norwalk Township, Townsend Township, and Wakeman Township.
- Willard City School District: including parts of Willard, Greenfield Township, New Haven Township, Norwich Township, and Richmond Township.
