= Firelands =

Historical region of Ohio, United States

Coordinates: 41°15′N 82°30′W

The Firelands, or Sufferers' Lands, tract was located at the western end of the Connecticut Western Reserve in what is now the U.S. state of Ohio. It was legislatively established in 1792, as the "Sufferers' Lands", and later became named "Fire Lands" because the resale of the land was intended as financial restitution for residents of the Connecticut towns of Danbury, Fairfield, Greenwich, Groton, New Haven, New London, Norwalk, and Ridgefield. Their homes had been burned in 1779 and 1781 by British forces during the American Revolutionary War. However, most of the settlement of the area did not occur until after the War of 1812. "Fire Lands" was later spelled as one word: "Firelands."

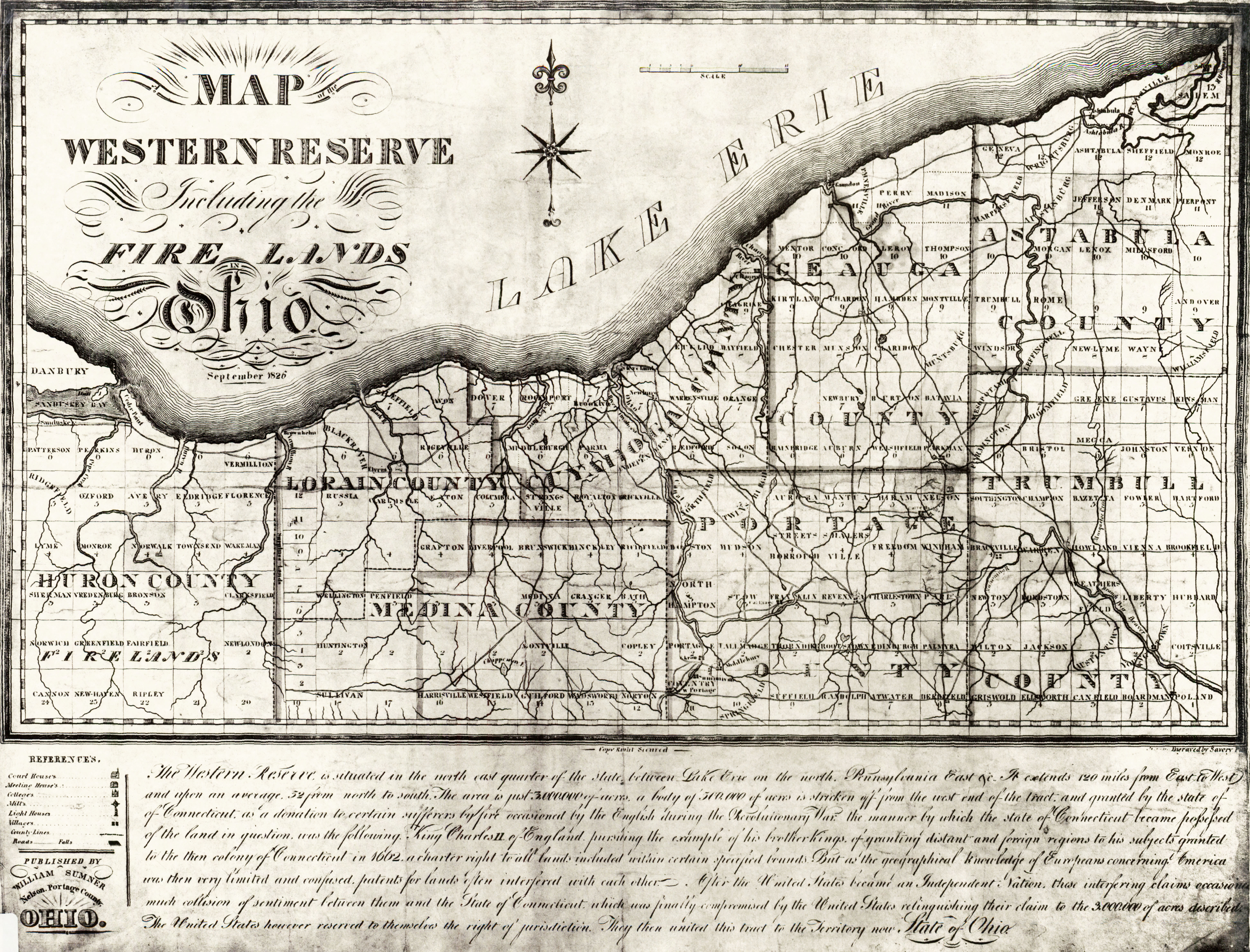
Map of the Western Reserve in 1826: the Firelands are on the west end (left).

== History ==
In 1792 the Connecticut legislature set aside 500,000 acres (2,000 km^{2}) at the western end of the "Western Reserve" for the Connecticut "Sufferers". The area consisted of nearly all of the present-day Huron and Erie counties, as well as Danbury Township (Marblehead Peninsula) and much of Catawba Island Township now in Ottawa County; and Ruggles Township now in Ashland County. (The 1792 legislative decree should not be confused with the actual pioneer settlement of these lands, which began to occur about 1807.)

It is not known if any of the actual "Sufferers" eventually settled in the Firelands. Prior to any settlement here, land speculators had purchased all of the original claims for re-sale. On April 15, 1803, the investor-proprietors formed a corporation to manage the lands to which they were entitled in the newly formed state of Ohio. The land was later divided into 30 square survey townships, five miles (8 km) on a side, which were further subdivided into 120 quarters, each containing 4,000 acres (16 km^{2}). (Although the standard for U.S. survey townships in the Northwest Territory was six miles or 9.7 kilometers square at that time, the older standard for survey townships in the Western Reserve was employed.) A drawing was held to determine which land each individual investor share-holder would receive.

Some of the original townships in the Firelands took their names from locations in Connecticut, or from the land-speculators who had purchased them. (In some cases the pioneer settlers took a dislike to these speculators, and so changed their township names.) Later, after the War of 1812, when villages began to be established here, many of these villages were also named for Connecticut villages.

In 1811, Huron County encompassed the entire Firelands (and also included a portion of later Lorain County). Until 1837, all of the Firelands would lie within—and therefore co-exist with—Huron County.

Modern sign-posts erected within this area have the "established 1792" designation date, as mentioned above. The lands were physically surveyed from 1806 to 1808, and very slowly settled after 1808. No villages had developed within the Firelands until about the end of the War of 1812. (The 1806–1808 surveys were not entirely accurate and exceeded the legislative parameters for the entire "Western Reserve" boundaries, resulting in "surplus lands" directly east of the boundary line of the Firelands.)

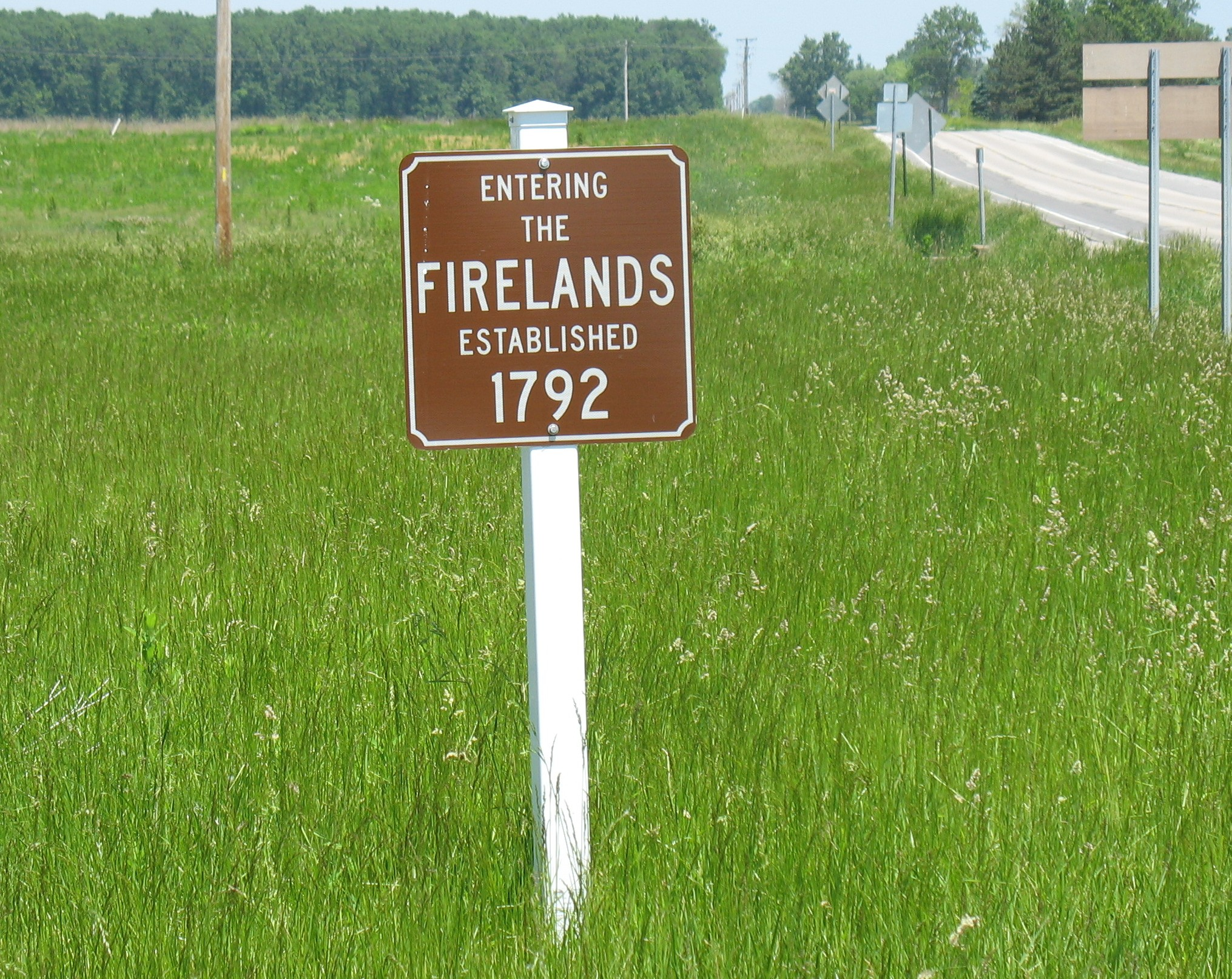
Firelands sign along Ohio State Route 4 in Sherman Township, Huron County, Ohio

== Municipalities ==
Ashland County
none

Erie County
Bay View
Bellevue (part)
Berlin Heights
Castalia
Huron
Milan (part)
Sandusky
Vermilion (part)

Huron County
Bellevue (part)
Greenwich
Milan (part)
Monroeville
New London
North Fairfield
Norwalk
Plymouth (part)
Wakeman
Willard

Ottawa County
Marblehead

== Townships ==
Ashland County
Ruggles

Erie County
Berlin
Florence
Groton
Huron
Margaretta
Milan
Oxford
Perkins
Vermilion

Huron County	
Bronson	Norwalk
Clarksfield	Norwich
Fairfield	Peru
Fitchville	Richmond
Greenfield	Ridgefield
Greenwich	Ripley
Hartland	Sherman
Lyme	Townsend
New Haven	Wakeman
New London

Ottawa County
Catawba Island (part)
Danbury

== Unincorporated places ==
Ashland County
Hereford
Ruggles

Erie County	
Anderson	North Monroeville (part)
Avery	North Palm Beach
Axtel	Oberlin Beach
Berlin Heights Station	Ogontz
Berlinville	Orchard Beach
Beulah Beach	Parkertown
Birmingham	Prout
Bloomingville	Ranch Wood
Bluebird Beach	Ruggles Beach
Bogart	Rye Beach
Cedar Point	Sand Hill
Ceylon	Sandusky South
Chaska Beach	Searsville
Columbus Park	Shinrock
Crystal Rock	Spears Corners
Fairview Lanes	Springbrook
Florence	Union Corners
Franklin Flats	Venice
Heidelberg Beach	Volunteer Bay
Joppa	Weyers
Kimball	Whites Landing
Mitiwanga	Wilmer
North Milan

Huron County	
Bismarck	Huron Junction
Boughtonville	Myers Mills
Celeryville	New Haven
Centerton	New Pittsburgh
Clarksfield	North Monroeville (part)
Collins	Olena
Delphi	Peru Hollow
East Norwalk	Phoenix Mills
East Townsend	Pontiac
Fitchville	Standardsburg
Guinea Corners	Steuben
Hanville Corners	Strongs Ridge
Hartland	Weavers Corners
Hartland Station	West Clarksfield
Havana	West Hartland
Holiday Lakes	White Fox
Hunts Corners

Ottawa County
Danbury
Harbor Acres
Lakeside
Mineyahta-on-the-Bay

== See also ==
- Northeast Ohio
- Vacationland (Ohio)
- Western Reserve
- BGSU Firelands
