= Ohio State Route 601 =

State highway in Ohio, US

State Route 601

Route information
- Maintained by ODOT
- Length: 5.93 mi (9.54 km)
- Existed: 1938–present

Major junctions
- South end: SR 18 / CR 51 near Norwalk
- US 20 near Norwalk
- North end: SR 113 in Milan

Location
- Country: United States
- State: Ohio
- Counties: Huron, Erie

Highway system
- Ohio State Highway System; Interstate; US; State; Scenic
← SR 600	→ SR 602

State Route 601 (SR 601) is a north–south state highway in North Central Ohio. A two-lane eastern bypass of Norwalk, SR 601 has its southern terminus at SR 18 southeast of Norwalk, adjacent to Summit Motorsports Park. The northern terminus of SR 601 is at SR 113 in downtown Milan, less than one-quarter mile (0.40 km) east of the junction of SR 113 and the U.S. Route 250 (US 250)/SR 13 concurrency.

== Route description ==
SR 601 starts at the intersection of SR 18 and Greenwich-Milan Town Line Road southeast of Norwalk in northern Huron County. Heading north from there, along the west side of SR 601 is Summit Motorsports Park, and immediately to the north of that, Norwalk-Huron County Airport. The east side of SR 601 has more of a rural feel to it. North of the airport, SR 601 intersects US 20. Both the SR 18 and US 20 intersections with SR 601 have been replaced by single lane roundabouts. After straddling the boundary between Norwalk Township and Townsend Township up to a point north of the US 20 intersection, SR 601 starts to bend to the northwest, entirely into Norwalk Township. Through this stretch, the two-lane highway encounters a blend of farmland, occasional homes and even a few businesses. SR 601 passes through an intersection with Gibbs Road, then continues on to its junction with SR 61, which is a signalized intersection.

Continuing northwest of SR 61, the setting that SR 601 passes through remains unchanged up through the intersection from which Perrin Road heads northeasterly, and Old State Road goes southward. Passing through that intersection, SR 601 encounters one subdivision on each side of the roadway, then promptly crosses into Erie County, and correspondingly, the village of Milan. Through Milan, SR 601 is routed along Main Street, and passes through a primarily residential portion of the community. SR 601 intersects Lockwood Road, then continues for another three blocks to its junction with SR 113. This downtown Milan intersection, which is controlled by mast-arm traffic signals, marks the endpoint of SR 601, and is located just a few blocks to the east of the concurrency of US 250 and SR 13.

== History ==
The SR 601 designation came into being in 1938. The routing of SR 601 has been consistent since inception, and has not seen any significant changes over the years.

== Major intersections ==
County	Location	mi	km	Destinations	Notes
Huron	Norwalk–Townsend township line	0.00	0.00	SR 18 / CR 51 (Greenwich Milan Town Line Road)	
Huron	Norwalk–Townsend township line	1.08	1.74	US 20 – Norwalk, Elyria	
Huron	Norwalk Township	3.28	5.28	SR 61 – Norwalk, Berlin Heights	
Erie	Milan	5.93	9.54	SR 113 (Church Street) / North Main Street	
1.000 mi = 1.609 km; 1.000 km = 0.621 mi
