= Fitchville, Ohio =

Unincorporated community in Ohio, U.S.

Coordinates: 41°05′41″N 82°29′19″W

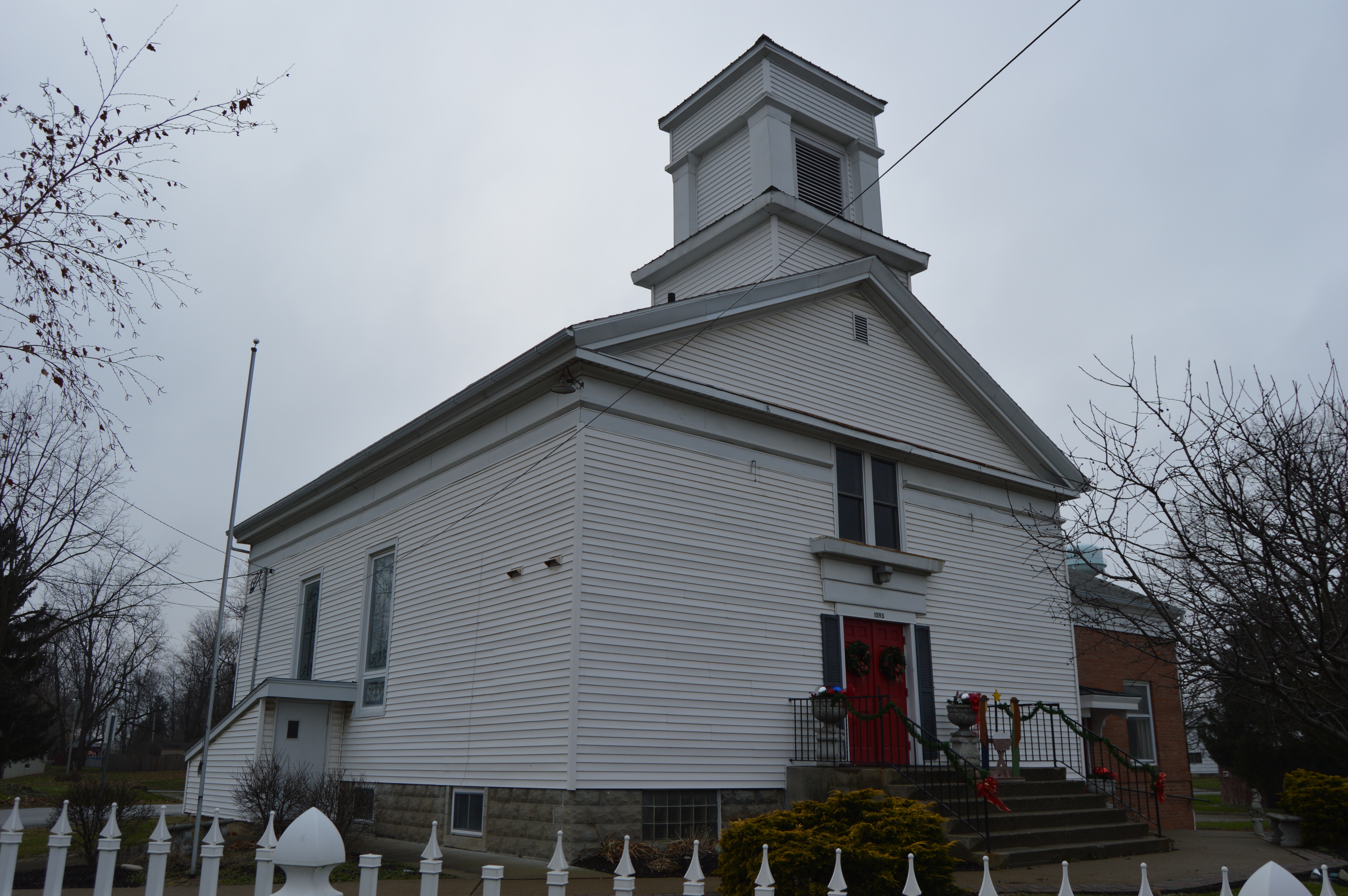
Fitchville Methodist Church

Fitchville is an unincorporated community in Fitchville Township, Huron County, Ohio, United States. It is part of the Norwalk Micropolitan Statistical Area. Fitchville is located at the intersection of U.S. Route 250, State Route 13, and State Route 162. The community has no post office of its own and is assigned the New London zip code of 44851. The Mansion Hotel was a prominent Fitchville landmark for one hundred and thirty years from 1839 to 1968. It was reputed to have hosted Abraham Lincoln, and served as an overnight resting place for many escaping slaves travelling on the "underground railroad".

== History ==
Fitchville and Fitchville Township are named for former governor of the Connecticut Colony Thomas Fitch. The Fitch family once owned land in this area of the Firelands section of the historic Connecticut Western Reserve.

Early on November 23, 1963, a fire killed 63 people in the Golden Age Nursing Home, one mile north of Fitchville due to overloaded electrical wiring. National media attention was diverted from the incident by the assassination of President Kennedy, which had taken place 15 hours earlier. The tragedy led to improvements in fire safety building codes.
