= Ripley Township, Ohio =

Ripley Township, Ohio may refer to:

- Ripley Township, Holmes County, Ohio
- Ripley Township, Huron County, Ohio
