= Olena (disambiguation) =

Olena is a Ukrainian feminine given name.

Olena may also refer to:

- Olena, Illinois
- Olena, Ohio
- Olena, medieval ruined town which gave name to Oleni, Greece
