= Boughtonville, Ohio =

Unincorporated community in Ohio, U.S.

Coordinates: 41°03′09″N 82°36′41″W

Boughtonville is an unincorporated community in Huron County, in the U.S. state of Ohio.

== History ==
A post office was established at Boughtonville in 1891, and remained in operation until it was discontinued in 1935. The community was named after the local Boughton family.
