= Centerton, Ohio =

Coordinates: 41°05′00″N 82°45′12″W

Centerton is an unincorporated community in Huron County, Ohio, United States.

== History ==
The first post office in Centerton was established in 1848. Centerton is near the center of Norwich Township, which most likely accounts for the name.
