= Brownhelm Township, Ohio =

Township in Ohio, US

- Township
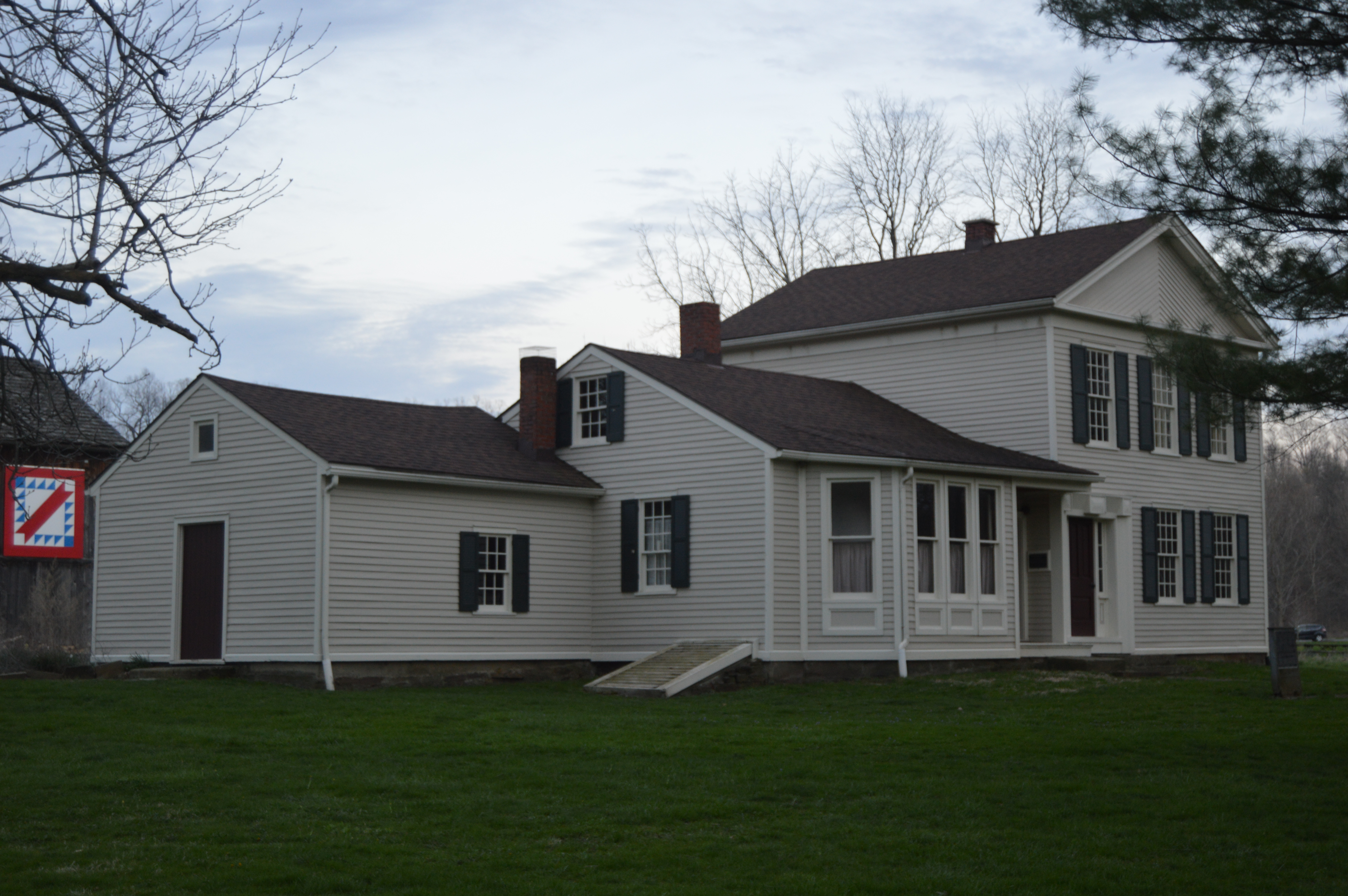
- The Mill Hollow House at the Vermilion River Reservation

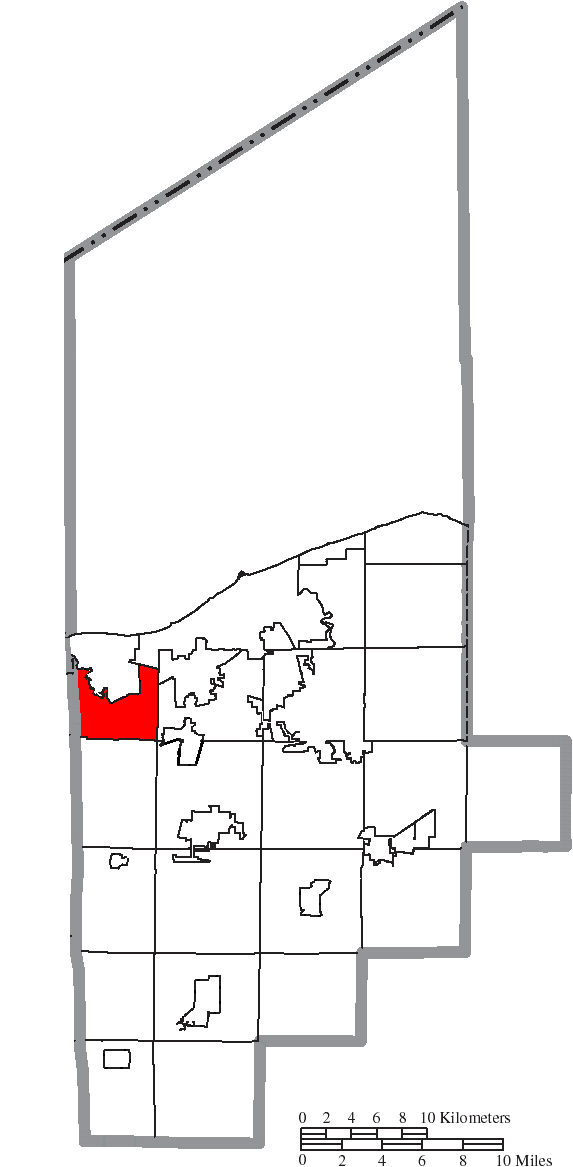
- Location of Brownhelm Township in Lorain County
- Coordinates: 41°24′12″N 82°19′1″W
- Country: United States
- State: Ohio
- County: Lorain

Area
  - Total: 20.58 sq mi (53.31 km^{2})
  - Land: 20.31 sq mi (52.60 km^{2})
  - Water: 0.27 sq mi (0.71 km^{2})
- Elevation: 653 ft (199 m)

Population (2020)
  - Total: 7,877
  - Density: 387.9/sq mi (149.8/km^{2})
- Time zone: UTC-5 (Eastern (EST))
  - Summer (DST): UTC-4 (EDT)
- ZIP code: 44001
- Area code: 440
- FIPS code: 39-09568
- GNIS feature ID: 1086503
- Website: www.brownhelm.us

Brownhelm Township is one of the eighteen townships of Lorain County, Ohio, United States. As of the 2020 census, the population was 7,877.

Brownhelm was the first local government of any kind in the United States to elect a black man to public office; on April 2, 1855, John Mercer Langston, a black man from Virginia, became town clerk. He later became a United States congressman.

== Geography ==
Located in northwestern Lorain County along the shores of Lake Erie, it borders the following townships and cities:

- Lorain - northeast
- Amherst - east, north of Amherst Township
- Amherst Township - east
- New Russia Township - southeast corner
- Henrietta Township - south
- Florence Township, Erie County - southwest corner
- Vermilion Township, Erie County - west

Parts of the city of Vermilion are located in northern Brownhelm Township.

== Name and history ==
It is the only Brownhelm Township statewide.

Brownhelm Township was "founded" in 1816 but judicially established in 1818. Some historians assert that the name "Brownhelm" was derived from the word holm, added onto the surname "Brown", referring to Col. Henry Brown, who founded the settlement in 1816. Alternatively, the name refers to the fact that Brown was "at the helm" of his settlement. The first pioneer-settlers within present-day Brownhelm Township in 1816 were Peter P. Pease (later also being the first settler of Oberlin, Ohio), and Daniel T. Baldwin (who shortly later helped to establish the city of Lorain). Due to the 19th-century practice of excluding single men from the definition of "settlers", these two men were not credited at the time as the first settlers of the township. As a result, modern historians have commonly attributed the "first pioneer-settlement" of Brownhelm Township as being in 1817.

== Notable person ==
- Burt Shotton, former Major League Baseball player and manager

== Government ==
The township is governed by a three-member board of trustees, who are elected in November of odd-numbered years to a four-year term beginning on the following January 1. Two are elected in the year after the presidential election and one is elected in the year before it. There is also an elected township fiscal officer, who serves a four-year term beginning on April 1 of the year after the election, which is held in November of the year before the presidential election. Vacancies in the fiscal officership or on the board of trustees are filled by the remaining trustees.
