= Henrietta Township, Lorain County, Ohio =

Township in Ohio, US

- Township
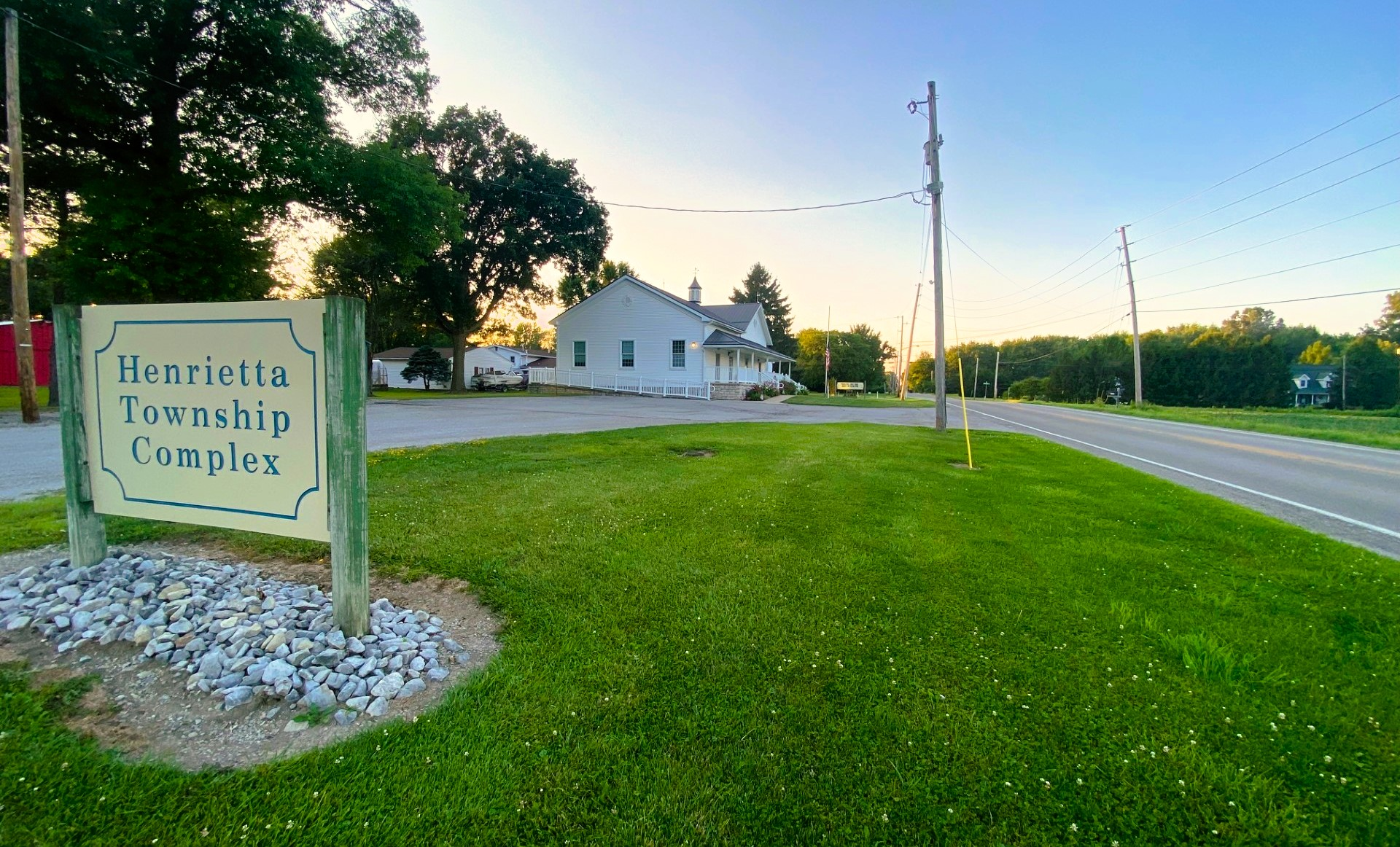
- Henrietta Township Town Hall.

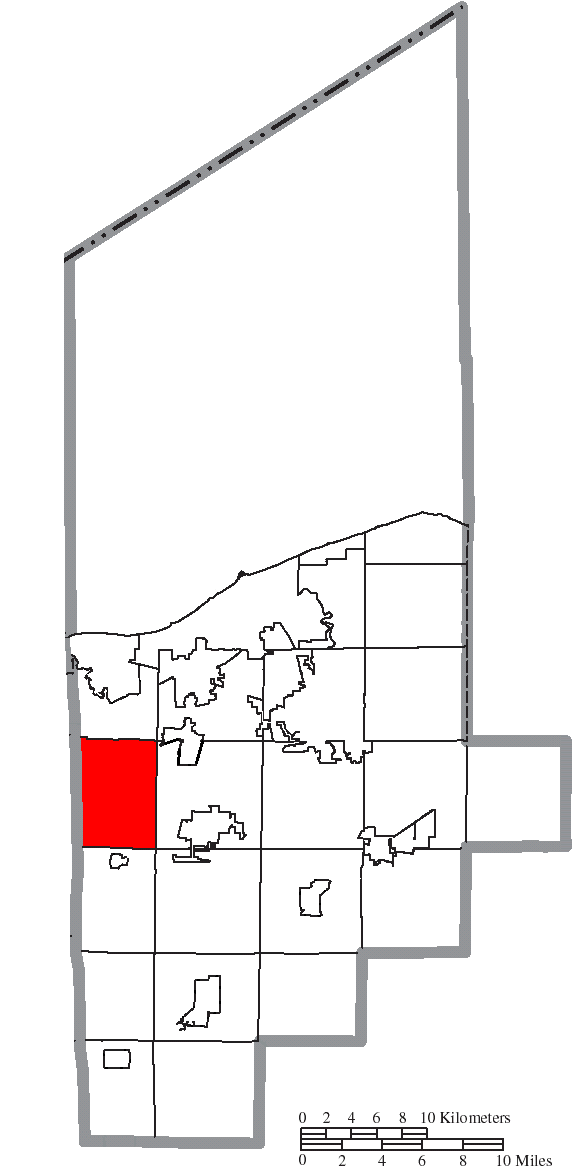
- Location of Henrietta Township in Lorain County
- Coordinates: 41°19′44″N 82°18′31″W
- Country: United States
- State: Ohio
- County: Lorain

Area
  - Total: 21.21 sq mi (54.93 km^{2})
  - Land: 21.16 sq mi (54.80 km^{2})
  - Water: 0.046 sq mi (0.12 km^{2})
- Elevation: 850 ft (259 m)

Population (2020)
  - Total: 1,779
  - Density: 84.08/sq mi (32.46/km^{2})
- Time zone: UTC-5 (Eastern (EST))
  - Summer (DST): UTC-4 (EDT)
- ZIP code: 44001
- Area code: 440
- FIPS code: 39-34972
- GNIS feature ID: 1086511
- Website: www.henriettaohio.org

Henrietta Township is one of the eighteen townships of Lorain County, Ohio, United States. As of the 2020 census the population was 1,779.

== Geography ==
Located in western Lorain County, it borders the following townships:

- Brownhelm Township - north
- Amherst Township - northeast corner
- New Russia Township - east
- Pittsfield Township - southeast corner
- Camden Township - south
- Wakeman Township, Huron County - southwest
- Florence Township, Erie County - west

No municipalities are located in Henrietta Township.

== Name and history ==
It is the only Henrietta Township statewide.

== Government ==
The township is governed by a three-member board of trustees, who are elected in November of odd-numbered years to a four-year term beginning on the following January 1. Two are elected in the year after the presidential election and one is elected in the year before it. There is also an elected township fiscal officer, who serves a four-year term beginning on April 1 of the year after the election, which is held in November of the year before the presidential election. Vacancies in the fiscal officership or on the board of trustees are filled by the remaining trustees.
