= Camden Township, Ohio =

Township in Ohio, US

Camden Township, Lorain County, Ohio
- Township
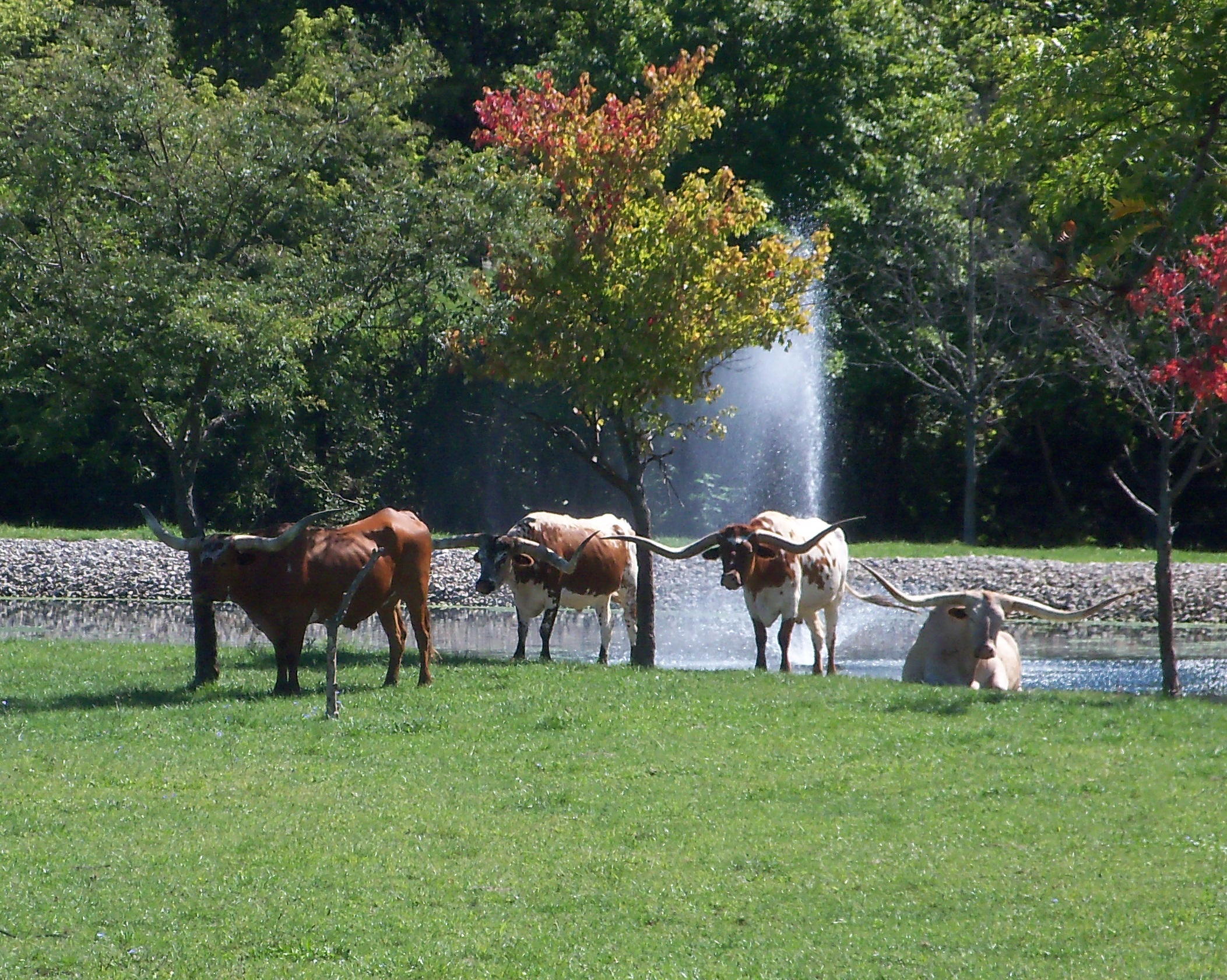
- Texas Longhorn rest near Route 20

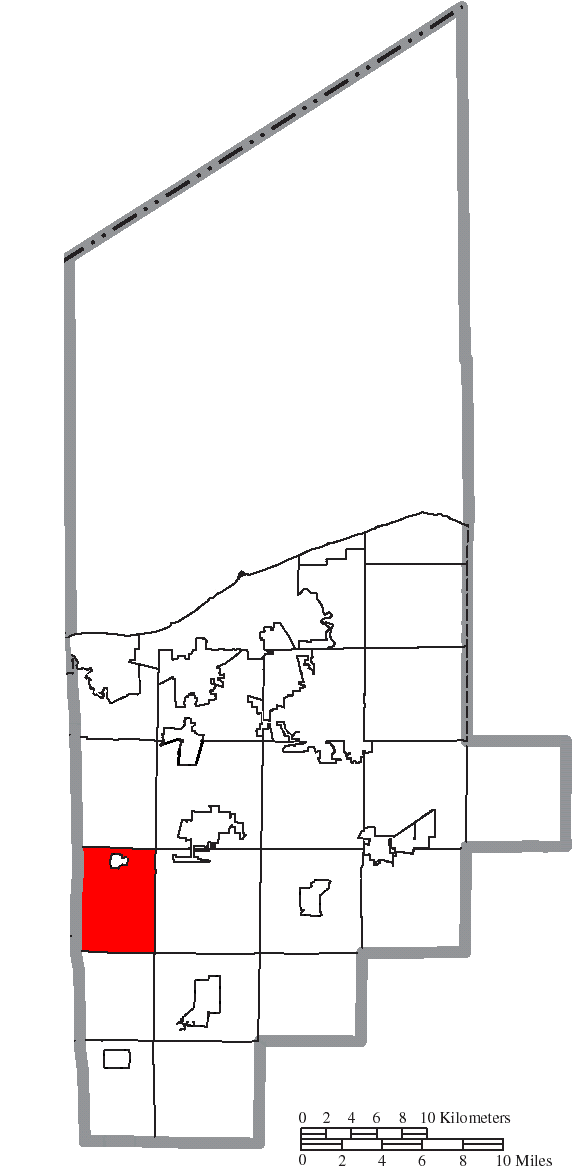
- Location of Camden Township in Lorain County
- Coordinates: 41°14′54″N 82°17′50″W
- Country: United States
- State: Ohio
- County: Lorain

Area
  - Total: 19.95 sq mi (51.68 km^{2})
  - Land: 19.89 sq mi (51.51 km^{2})
  - Water: 0.062 sq mi (0.16 km^{2})
- Elevation: 863 ft (263 m)

Population (2020)
  - Total: 1,508
  - Density: 75.82/sq mi (29.28/km^{2})
- Time zone: UTC-5 (Eastern (EST))
  - Summer (DST): UTC-4 (EDT)
- FIPS code: 39-11010
- GNIS feature ID: 1086504
- Website: www.camdentwp.us

Camden Township is one of the eighteen townships of Lorain County, Ohio, United States. As of the 2020 census, the population was 1,508.

== Geography ==
Located in western Lorain County, it borders the following town

- Henrietta Township - north
- New Russia Township - northeast corner
- Pittsfield Township - east
- Wellington Township - southeast corner
- Brighton Township - south
- Clarksfield Township, Huron County - southwest
- Wakeman Township, Huron County - west

The village of Kipton is located in northern Camden Township.

== Name and history ==
Camden Township was named after Camden, New York, the native home of a land agent. It is the only Camden Township statewide.

== Government ==
The township is governed by a three-member board of trustees, who are elected in November of odd-numbered years to a four-year term beginning on the following January 1. Two are elected in the year after the presidential election and one is elected in the year before it. There is also an elected township fiscal officer, who serves a four-year term beginning on April 1 of the year after the election, which is held in November of the year before the presidential election. Vacancies in the fiscal officership or on the board of trustees.
