= Bronson Township, Ohio =

Township in Ohio, US

- Township
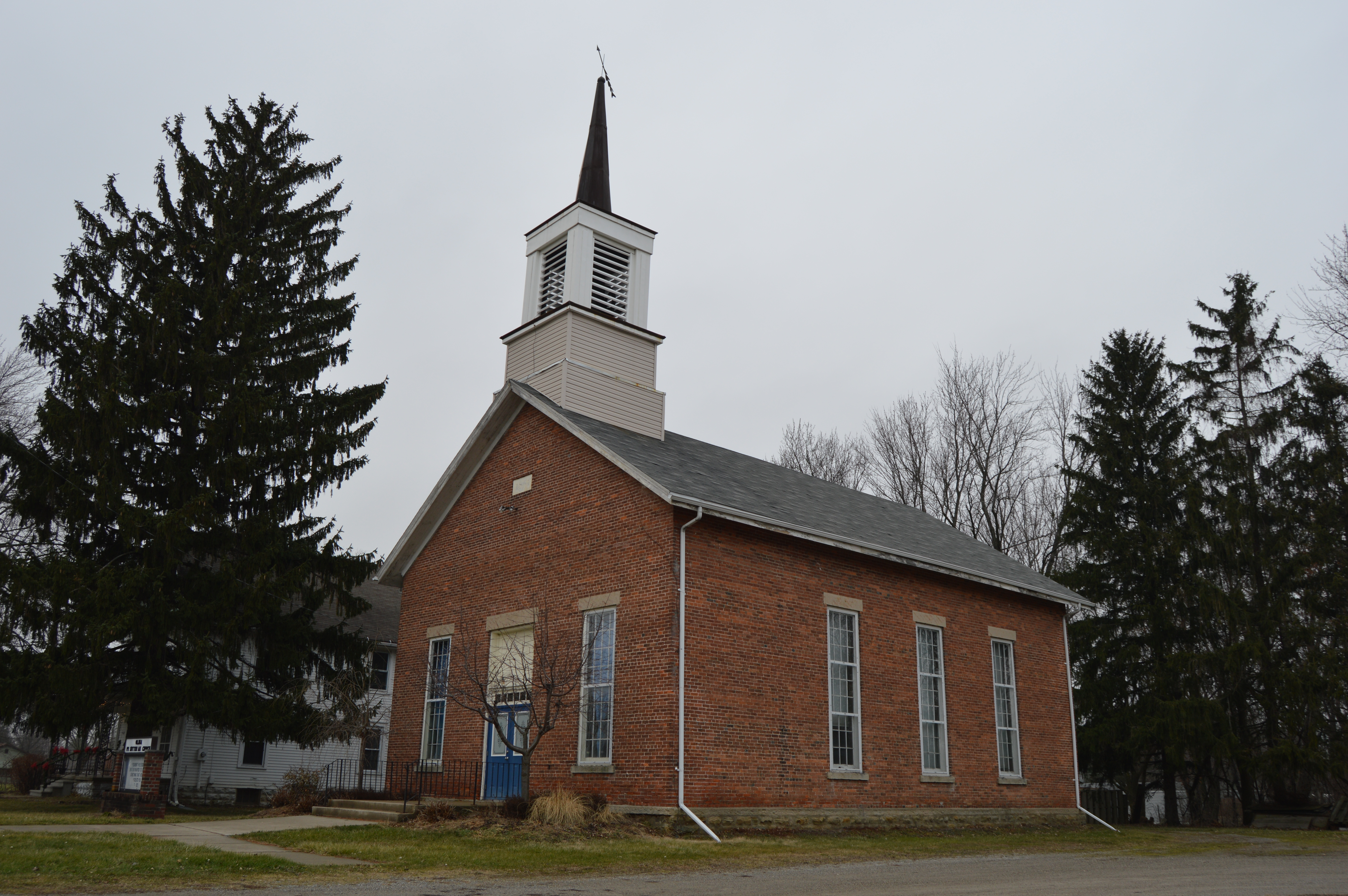
- Presbyterian church at Olena

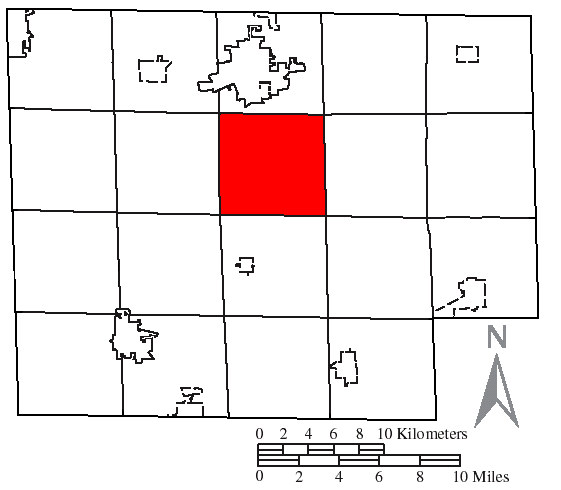
- Location of Bronson Township in Huron County
- Coordinates: 41°10′52″N 82°36′5″W
- Country: United States
- State: Ohio
- County: Huron

Area
  - Total: 26.3 sq mi (68.0 km^{2})
  - Land: 26.2 sq mi (67.8 km^{2})
  - Water: 0.077 sq mi (0.2 km^{2})
- Elevation: 890 ft (270 m)

Population (2020)
  - Total: 1,927
  - Density: 73.6/sq mi (28.4/km^{2})
- Time zone: UTC-5 (Eastern (EST))
  - Summer (DST): UTC-4 (EDT)
- ZIP code: 44857
- Area code: 419
- FIPS code: 39-09148
- GNIS feature ID: 1086342
- Website: https://bronsontownship.com/

Bronson Township is one of the nineteen townships of Huron County, Ohio, United States. As of the 2020 census the population of the township was 1,927.

== Geography ==
Located in the center of the county, it borders the following townships:

- Norwalk Township – north
- Hartland Township – northeast corner
- Fitchville Township – east
- Greenwich Township – southeast corner
- Ripley Township – south
- New Haven Township – southwest corner
- Greenfield Township – west
- Peru Township – northwest corner

No municipalities are located in Bronson Township.

== Name and history ==
Bronson Township was named for Isaac Bronson, one of the first landowners there.

It is the only Bronson Township statewide.

== Government ==
The township is governed by a three-member board of trustees, who are elected in November of odd-numbered years to a four-year term beginning on the following January 1. Two are elected in the year after the presidential election and one is elected in the year before it. There is also an elected township fiscal officer, who serves a four-year term beginning on April 1 of the year after the election, which is held in November of the year before the presidential election. Vacancies in the fiscal officership or on the board of trustees are filled by the remaining trustees.
