= Delphi, Ohio =

Unincorporated community in Ohio, U.S.

Coordinates: 41°01′52″N 82°36′28″W

Delphi is an unincorporated community in Huron County, in the U.S. state of Ohio.

== History ==
The community is said to be named after Delphi, New York. A variant name was Ripleyville. A post office called Ripleyville was established in 1830, and remained in operation until 1902.
