= Huron County, Ohio =

County in Ohio, United States

- County
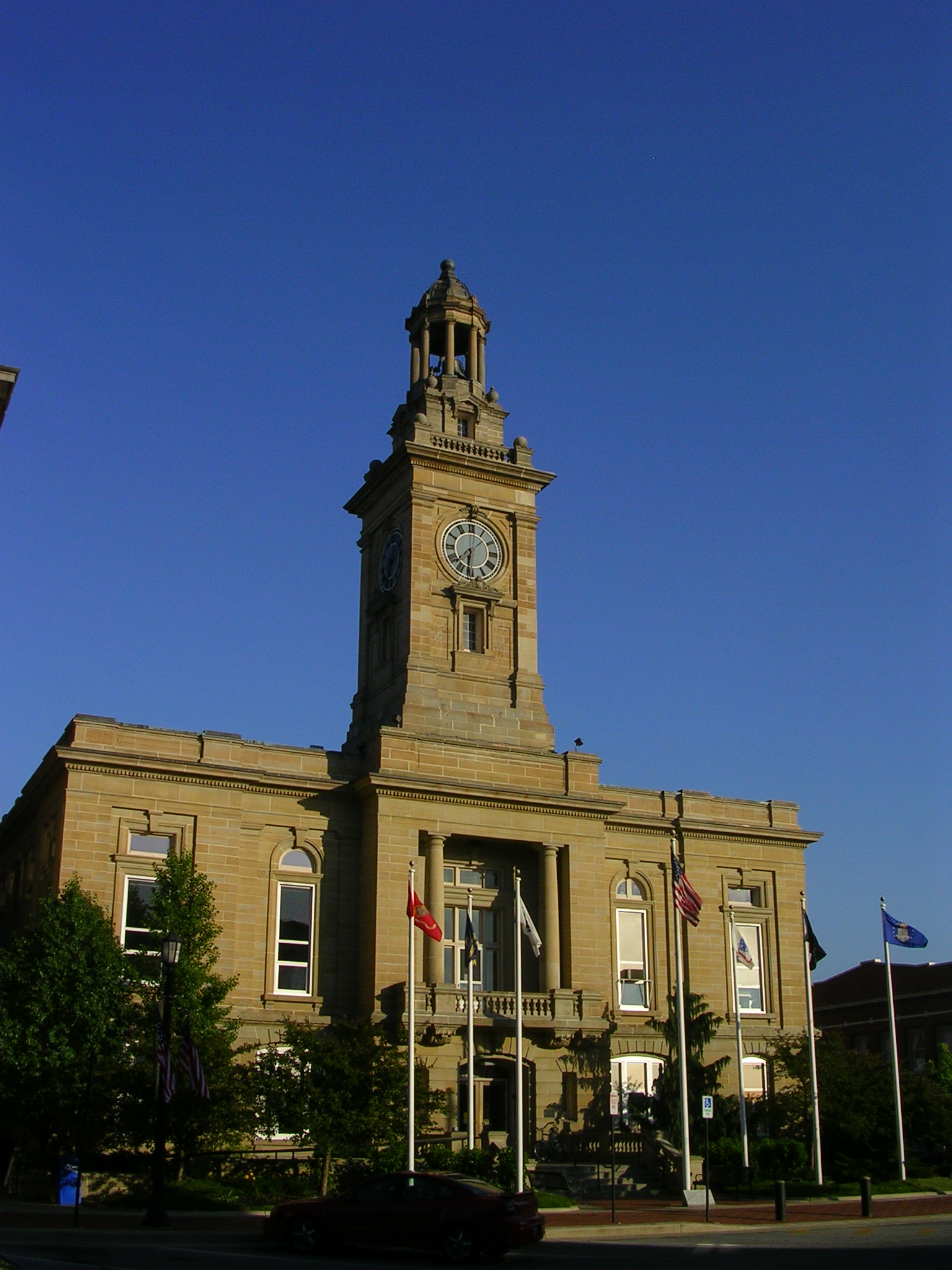
- Huron County Courthouse

- Flag Seal

- Location within the U.S. state of Ohio
- Coordinates: 41°09′N 82°36′W
- Country: United States
- State: Ohio
- Founded: April 1, 1815
- Named for: Huron tribe
- Seat: Norwalk
- Largest city: Norwalk

Area
  - Total: 495 sq mi (1,280 km^{2})
  - Land: 491 sq mi (1,270 km^{2})
  - Water: 3.3 sq mi (8.5 km^{2}) 0.7%

Population (2020)
  - Total: 58,565
  - Estimate (2025): 58,250 ▼
  - Density: 119/sq mi (46.1/km^{2})
- Time zone: UTC−5 (Eastern)
  - Summer (DST): UTC−4 (EDT)
- Congressional district: 5th
- Website: www.huroncounty-oh.gov

Huron County (/ˈhjʊərɒn, -ən/ HURE-on, -ən) is a county located in the U.S. state of Ohio. As of the 2020 census, the population was 58,565. Its county seat is Norwalk. The county was created in 1809 and later organized in 1815. Huron County is included in the Norwalk, OH Micropolitan Statistical Area, which is also included in the Cleveland-Akron-Canton, OH Combined Statistical Area.

== History ==
Huron County was named in honor of the Huron Indians (more correctly called the Wendat, or their successor people "Wyandot"), an Iroquoian-speaking tribe who occupied large areas in the Great Lakes region. The word "Huron" may be French, although this origin is disputed.

In the late 18th century, this area was in the U.S. Northwest Territory, part of the Connecticut Western Reserve in a sub-region called the Firelands. Connecticut had originally claimed the land as part of its original colony, then afterward wanted to use it to grant land to veterans in lieu of cash payment for their service in the war. In 1795, the Connecticut Land Company purchased this land for resale and development. Later, it was solely administered by the "Fire Land Company". Many of the townships in Huron County are named for places in Connecticut.

== Geography ==
According to the U.S. Census Bureau, the county has a total area of 495 square miles (1,280 km^{2}), of which 491 square miles (1,270 km^{2}) is land and 3.3 square miles (8.5 km^{2}) (0.7%) is water.

=== Adjacent counties ===
- Erie County (north)
- Lorain County (east)
- Ashland County (southeast)
- Richland County (south)
- Crawford County (southwest)
- Seneca County (west)
- Sandusky County (northwest)

== Demographics ==
Historical population
Census	Pop.	Note	%±
1820	6,675		—
1830	13,341		99.9%
1840	23,933		79.4%
1850	26,203		9.5%
1860	29,616		13.0%
1870	28,532		−3.7%
1880	31,609		10.8%
1890	31,949		1.1%
1900	32,330		1.2%
1910	34,206		5.8%
1920	32,424		−5.2%
1930	33,700		3.9%
1940	34,800		3.3%
1950	39,353		13.1%
1960	47,326		20.3%
1970	49,587		4.8%
1980	54,608		10.1%
1990	56,240		3.0%
2000	59,487		5.8%
2010	59,626		0.2%
2020	58,565		−1.8%
2025 (est.)	58,250	▼	−0.5%
U.S. Decennial Census; 1790-1960 1900-1990; 1990-2000 2020

=== 2020 census ===
As of the 2020 census, the county had a population of 58,565 and a median age of 41.0 years. The age distribution included 23.5% of residents under the age of 18 and 18.4% aged 65 or older, with 97.0 males per 100 females overall and 94.4 males per 100 females age 18 and over.

As of the 2020 census, the racial makeup of the county was 89.5% White, 1.0% Black or African American, 0.3% American Indian and Alaska Native, 0.4% Asian, <0.1% Native Hawaiian and Pacific Islander, 2.5% from some other race, and 6.2% from two or more races. Hispanic or Latino residents of any race comprised 7.0% of the population.

As of the 2020 census, 48.6% of residents lived in urban areas, while 51.4% lived in rural areas.

As of the 2020 census, there were 23,406 households in the county, of which 29.8% had children under the age of 18 living in them. Of all households, 48.3% were married-couple households, 17.9% were households with a male householder and no spouse or partner present, and 25.4% were households with a female householder and no spouse or partner present. About 27.5% of all households were made up of individuals and 12.5% had someone living alone who was 65 years of age or older.

As of the 2020 census, there were 25,499 housing units, of which 8.2% were vacant. Among occupied housing units, 68.9% were owner-occupied and 31.1% were renter-occupied, with a homeowner vacancy rate of 1.3% and a rental vacancy rate of 7.2%.

=== Racial and ethnic composition ===
Huron County, Ohio – Racial and ethnic composition Note: the US Census treats Hispanic/Latino as an ethnic category. This table excludes Latinos from the racial categories and assigns them to a separate category. Hispanics/Latinos may be of any race.
Race / Ethnicity (NH = Non-Hispanic)	Pop 1980	Pop 1990	Pop 2000	Pop 2010	Pop 2020	% 1980	% 1990	% 2000	% 2010	% 2020
White alone (NH)	53,191	54,390	56,057	54,649	51,242	97.41%	96.71%	94.23%	91.65%	87.50%
Black or African American alone (NH)	571	589	557	560	562	1.05%	1.05%	0.94%	0.94%	0.96%
Native American or Alaska Native alone (NH)	43	84	96	116	139	0.08%	0.15%	0.16%	0.19%	0.24%
Asian alone (NH)	94	148	149	170	216	0.17%	0.26%	0.25%	0.29%	0.37%
Native Hawaiian or Pacific Islander alone (NH)	x	x	4	10	12	x	x	0.01%	0.02%	0.02%
Other race alone (NH)	28	23	38	22	106	0.05%	0.04%	0.06%	0.04%	0.18%
Mixed race or Multiracial (NH)	x	x	469	766	2,204	x	x	0.79%	1.28%	3.76%
Hispanic or Latino (any race)	681	1,006	2,117	3,333	4,084	1.25%	1.79%	3.56%	5.59%	6.97%
Total	54,608	56,240	59,487	59,626	58,565	100.00%	100.00%	100.00%	100.00%	100.00%

=== 2010 census ===
As of the 2010 United States census, there were 59,626 people, 22,820 households, and 16,141 families living in the county. The population density was 121.3 inhabitants per square mile (46.8/km^{2}). There were 25,196 housing units at an average density of 51.3 units per square mile (19.8 units/km^{2}). The racial makeup of the county was 94.9% white, 1.0% black or African American, 0.3% Asian, 0.2% American Indian, 2.0% from other races, and 1.6% from two or more races. Those of Hispanic or Latino origin made up 5.6% of the population. In terms of ancestry, 36.4% were German, 14.5% were Irish, 10.8% were English, and 8.9% were American.

Of the 22,820 households, 35.0% had children under the age of 18 living with them, 53.5% were married couples living together, 12.2% had a female householder with no husband present, 29.3% were non-families, and 24.4% of all households were made up of individuals. The average household size was 2.59 and the average family size was 3.05. The median age was 38.4 years.

The median income for a household in the county was $47,058 and the median income for a family was $53,887. Males had a median income of $41,566 versus $30,967 for females. The per capita income for the county was $21,743. About 10.9% of families and 14.5% of the population were below the poverty line, including 23.3% of those under age 18 and 7.0% of those age 65 or over.

=== 2000 census ===
As of the census of 2000, there were 59,487 people, 22,307 households, and 16,217 families living in the county. The population density was 121 inhabitants per square mile (47/km^{2}). There were 23,594 housing units at an average density of 48 units per square mile (19/km^{2}). The racial makeup of the county was 95.98% White, 0.97% Black or African American, 0.18% Native American, 0.25% Asian, 0.01% Pacific Islander, 1.63% from other races, and 0.99% from two or more races. 3.56% of the population were Hispanic or Latino of any race.

There were 22,307 households, out of which 36.30% had children under the age of 18 living with them, 58.50% were married couples living together, 10.40% had a female householder with no husband present, and 27.30% were non-families. 23.10% of all households were made up of individuals, and 9.70% had someone living alone who was 65 years of age or older. The average household size was 2.64 and the average family size was 3.11.

In the county, the population was spread out, with 28.30% under the age of 18, 8.50% from 18 to 24, 28.90% from 25 to 44, 21.90% from 45 to 64, and 12.40% who were 65 years of age or older. The median age was 35 years. For every 100 females there were 96.10 males. For every 100 females age 18 and over, there were 92.90 males.

The median income for a household in the county was $40,558, and the median income for a family was $46,911. Males had a median income of $35,760 versus $22,785 for females. The per capita income for the county was $18,133. About 6.50% of families and 8.50% of the population were below the poverty line, including 11.00% of those under age 18 and 7.70% of those age 65 or over.

== Politics ==
Huron County has almost always been a Republican stronghold. However, in the election of 1996, Bill Clinton narrowly carried the county by a margin of 0.5%.

United States presidential election results for Huron County, Ohio
Year	Republican		Democratic		Third party(ies)	
Year	No.	%	No.	%	No.	%
1856	3,468	66.30%	1,709	32.67%	54	1.03%
1860	4,107	65.39%	2,083	33.16%	91	1.45%
1864	4,430	67.99%	2,086	32.01%	0	0.00%
1868	4,019	64.18%	2,243	35.82%	0	0.00%
1872	3,812	62.82%	2,182	35.96%	74	1.22%
1876	4,504	59.37%	3,014	39.73%	68	0.90%
1880	4,566	57.96%	3,040	38.59%	272	3.45%
1884	4,650	56.01%	3,311	39.88%	341	4.11%
1888	4,392	53.35%	3,438	41.76%	402	4.88%
1892	4,257	51.93%	3,592	43.82%	349	4.26%
1896	5,008	53.98%	4,185	45.11%	84	0.91%
1900	4,993	55.14%	3,906	43.14%	156	1.72%
1904	5,613	66.11%	2,622	30.88%	255	3.00%
1908	4,930	52.73%	4,262	45.58%	158	1.69%
1912	1,707	20.61%	3,317	40.05%	3,259	39.35%
1916	4,048	48.31%	4,136	49.36%	196	2.34%
1920	9,348	67.18%	4,398	31.61%	169	1.21%
1924	8,340	62.12%	2,871	21.39%	2,214	16.49%
1928	10,702	67.18%	5,157	32.37%	71	0.45%
1932	8,702	49.16%	8,795	49.69%	204	1.15%
1936	8,318	46.15%	8,500	47.16%	1,204	6.68%
1940	11,758	63.56%	6,741	36.44%	0	0.00%
1944	11,442	66.06%	5,879	33.94%	0	0.00%
1948	9,004	59.50%	6,073	40.13%	57	0.38%
1952	12,372	71.73%	4,875	28.27%	0	0.00%
1956	12,208	73.43%	4,418	26.57%	0	0.00%
1960	12,261	61.94%	7,534	38.06%	0	0.00%
1964	7,655	41.52%	10,780	58.48%	0	0.00%
1968	9,456	53.38%	6,515	36.78%	1,743	9.84%
1972	10,942	63.10%	5,491	31.67%	907	5.23%
1976	9,386	51.95%	7,742	42.85%	938	5.19%
1980	11,173	58.32%	6,537	34.12%	1,449	7.56%
1984	14,388	67.96%	6,609	31.22%	174	0.82%
1988	12,633	61.20%	7,794	37.76%	215	1.04%
1992	9,480	38.74%	7,930	32.41%	7,061	28.85%
1996	8,750	41.35%	8,858	41.86%	3,553	16.79%
2000	12,286	57.52%	8,183	38.31%	891	4.17%
2004	14,817	57.97%	10,568	41.35%	173	0.68%
2008	12,884	50.36%	12,076	47.21%	622	2.43%
2012	13,060	52.85%	11,006	44.54%	645	2.61%
2016	16,226	64.90%	7,192	28.77%	1,584	6.34%
2020	18,956	69.72%	7,759	28.54%	475	1.75%
2024	19,487	71.25%	7,498	27.42%	364	1.33%

United States Senate election results for Huron County, Ohio1
Year	Republican		Democratic		Third party(ies)	
Year	No.	%	No.	%	No.	%
2024	17,090	63.69%	8,452	31.50%	1,289	4.80%

== Government ==
=== Officials ===
Commissioner - James R. Morgan Appointed in October 2025 to fulfill Bradley Mesenburg's term he resigned from on September 12, 2025

Commissioner - Harry Brady

Commissioner - Tom Dunlap

Auditor - Roland Tkach

Clerk of Courts - Gina Hartman

Coroner - Jeffery Harwood

Engineer - Lee Tansey

Prosecutor - Joel Sitterly

Recorder - Jan Tkach

Treasurer - Megan Bursley

Sheriff - Todd Corbin

Judge of Court of Common Pleas - James Conway

Court Secretary (non-elected position) - Julie Wise

== Transportation ==
=== Airports ===
The Norwalk-Huron County Airport is located three nautical miles (3.5 mi; 5.6 km) east of Norwalk's central business district.

=== Major highways ===
- US Route 20
- US Route 224
- US Route 250
- State Route 4
- State Route 13
- State Route 18
- State Route 60
- State Route 61
- State Route 99
- State Route 103
- State Route 113
- State Route 162
- State Route 269
- State Route 303
- State Route 547
- State Route 598
- State Route 601
- State Route 603

== Communities ==
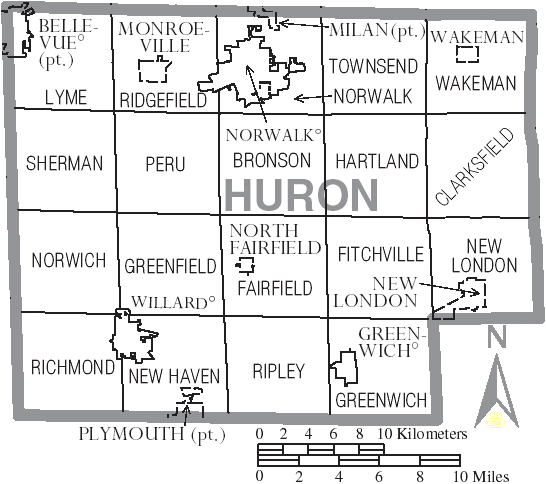
Map of Huron County, Ohio with Municipal and Township Labels

=== Cities ===
- Bellevue
- Norwalk (county seat)
- Willard

=== Villages ===
- Greenwich
- Milan
- Monroeville
- New London
- North Fairfield
- Plymouth
- Wakeman

=== Townships ===
- Bronson
- Clarksfield
- Fairfield
- Fitchville
- Greenfield
- Greenwich
- Hartland
- Lyme
- New Haven
- New London
- Norwalk
- Norwich
- Peru
- Richmond
- Ridgefield
- Ripley
- Sherman
- Townsend
- Wakeman

=== Census-designated places ===
- Celeryville
- Collins
- Holiday Lakes
- New Haven

=== Unincorporated communities ===
- Boughtonville
- Centerton
- Clarksfield
- Delphi
- East Townsend
- Fitchville
- Havana
- Hunts Corners
- New Pittsburgh
- North Monroeville
- Olena
- Steuben

== Notable people ==
- Phillip Johnson, American Architect
- Laura Owens, American Painter
- Ezekiel S. Sampson, two-term Republican Congressman from Iowa's 6th congressional district; born in Huron County.
- Paul Brown, American college and professional football coach; member of the Pro Football Hall of Fame
- Lefty Grove, American baseball player, member of the Baseball Hall of Fame

== See also ==
- National Register of Historic Places listings in Huron County, Ohio
