= New London Township, Huron County, Ohio =

Township in Ohio, US

- Township
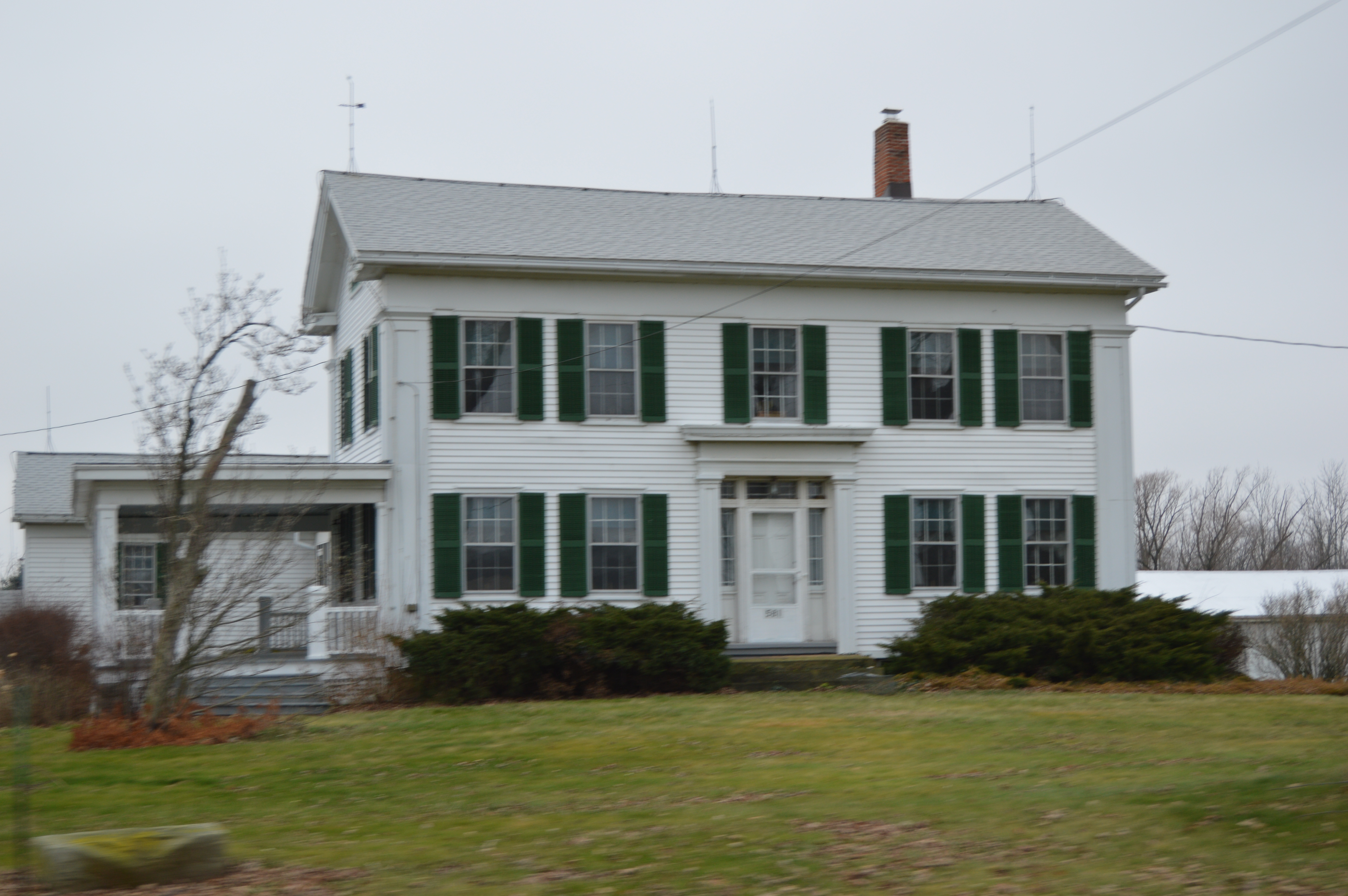
- Miller-Bissell Farmhouse on State Route 60

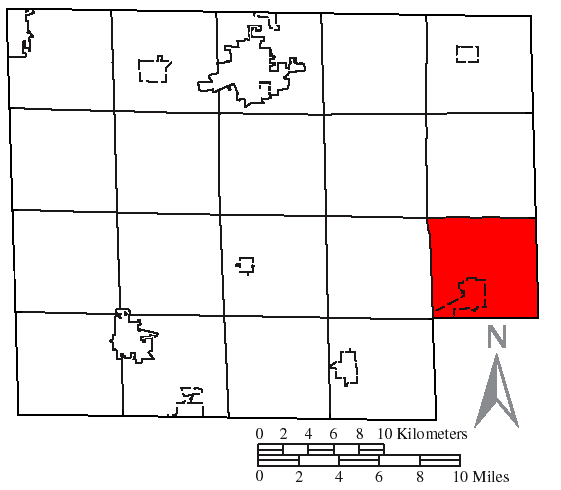
- Location of New London Township in Huron County
- Coordinates: 41°5′30″N 82°23′25″W
- Country: United States
- State: Ohio
- County: Huron

Area
  - Total: 26.2 sq mi (67.9 km^{2})
  - Land: 25.7 sq mi (66.6 km^{2})
  - Water: 0.50 sq mi (1.3 km^{2})
- Elevation: 974 ft (297 m)

Population (2020)
  - Total: 3,226
  - Density: 125/sq mi (48.4/km^{2})
- Time zone: UTC-5 (Eastern (EST))
  - Summer (DST): UTC-4 (EDT)
- ZIP code: 44851
- Area code: 419
- FIPS code: 39-54922
- GNIS feature ID: 1086351

New London Township is one of the nineteen townships of Huron County, Ohio, United States. As of the 2020 census the population of the township was 3,226.

== Geography ==
Located on the eastern edge of the county, it borders the following townships:

- Clarksfield Township - north
- Brighton Township, Lorain County - northeast corner
- Rochester Township, Lorain County - east
- Troy Township, Ashland County - southeast corner
- Ruggles Township, Ashland County - south
- Greenwich Township - southwest corner
- Fitchville Township - west
- Hartland Township - northwest corner

The village of New London is located in southern New London Township.

== Name and history ==
New London Township was organized in 1817. It was named after New London, Connecticut, the hometown of many of its pioneer settlers. The township is included in the category of the original Ohio Firelands.

It is the only New London Township statewide.

== Government ==
The township is governed by a three-member board of trustees, who are elected in November of odd-numbered years to a four-year term beginning on the following January 1. Two are elected in the year after the presidential election and one is elected in the year before it. There is also an elected township fiscal officer, who serves a four-year term beginning on April 1 of the year after the election, which is held in November of the year before the presidential election. Vacancies in the fiscal officership or on the board of trustees are filled by the remaining trustees.
