= Berlin Township, Erie County, Ohio =

Township in Ohio, US

- Township
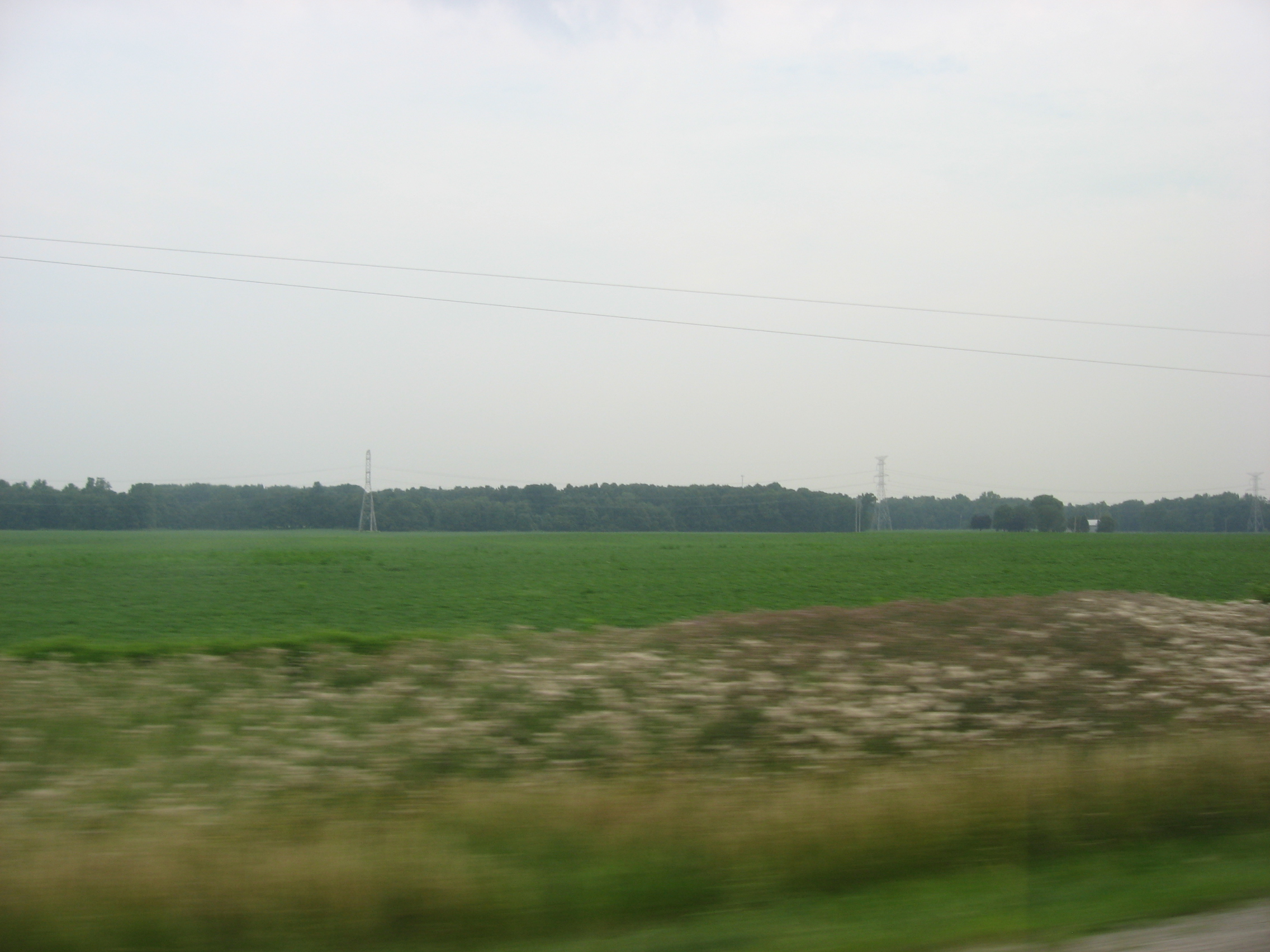
- Countryside in central Berlin Township

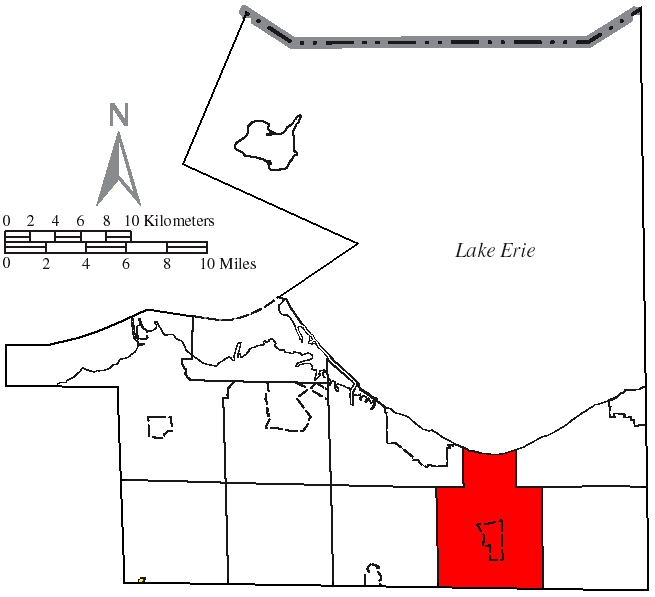
- Location of Berlin Township in Erie County
- Coordinates: 41°20′18″N 82°30′4″W
- Country: United States
- State: Ohio
- County: Erie

Area
  - Total: 31.6 sq mi (81.9 km^{2})
  - Land: 30.4 sq mi (78.8 km^{2})
  - Water: 1.2 sq mi (3.1 km^{2})
- Elevation: 784 ft (239 m)

Population (2020)
  - Total: 3,450
  - Density: 113/sq mi (43.8/km^{2})
- Time zone: UTC-5 (Eastern (EST))
  - Summer (DST): UTC-4 (EDT)
- FIPS code: 39-05802
- GNIS feature ID: 1086061
- Website: berlintwpohio.com

Berlin Township is one of the nine townships of Erie County, Ohio, United States. It is part of the Sandusky, Ohio metropolitan statistical area. As of the 2020 census the population was 3,450.

== Geography ==
Located in the eastern part of the county along Lake Erie, it borders the following townships:

- Vermilion Township - northeast
- Florence Township - east
- Wakeman Township, Huron County - southeast corner
- Townsend Township, Huron County - south
- Norwalk Township, Huron County - southwest corner
- Milan Township - west
- Huron Township - northwest

The village of Berlin Heights is located in southern Berlin Township. The census-designated place of Mitiwanga lies in both Berlin Township and Vermillion Township.

== Name and history ==
- Statewide, other Berlin Townships are located in Delaware, Holmes, Knox, and Mahoning Counties.
- This township had been originally established about 1808 as "Eldredge" Township, in honor of one of its original land-speculators; however, due to that land-owner falling into dis-favor with the pioneer-settlers who purchased their farms from him, the township name was shortly-later changed to "Berlin" township.

== Government ==
The township is governed by a three-member board of trustees, who are elected in November of odd-numbered years to a four-year term beginning on the following January 1. Two are elected in the year after the presidential election and one is elected in the year before it. There is also an elected township fiscal officer, who serves a four-year term beginning on April 1 of the year after the election, which is held in November of the year before the presidential election. Vacancies in the fiscal officership or on the board of trustees are filled by the remaining trustees.
