= Florence Township, Erie County, Ohio =

Township in Ohio, US

- Township
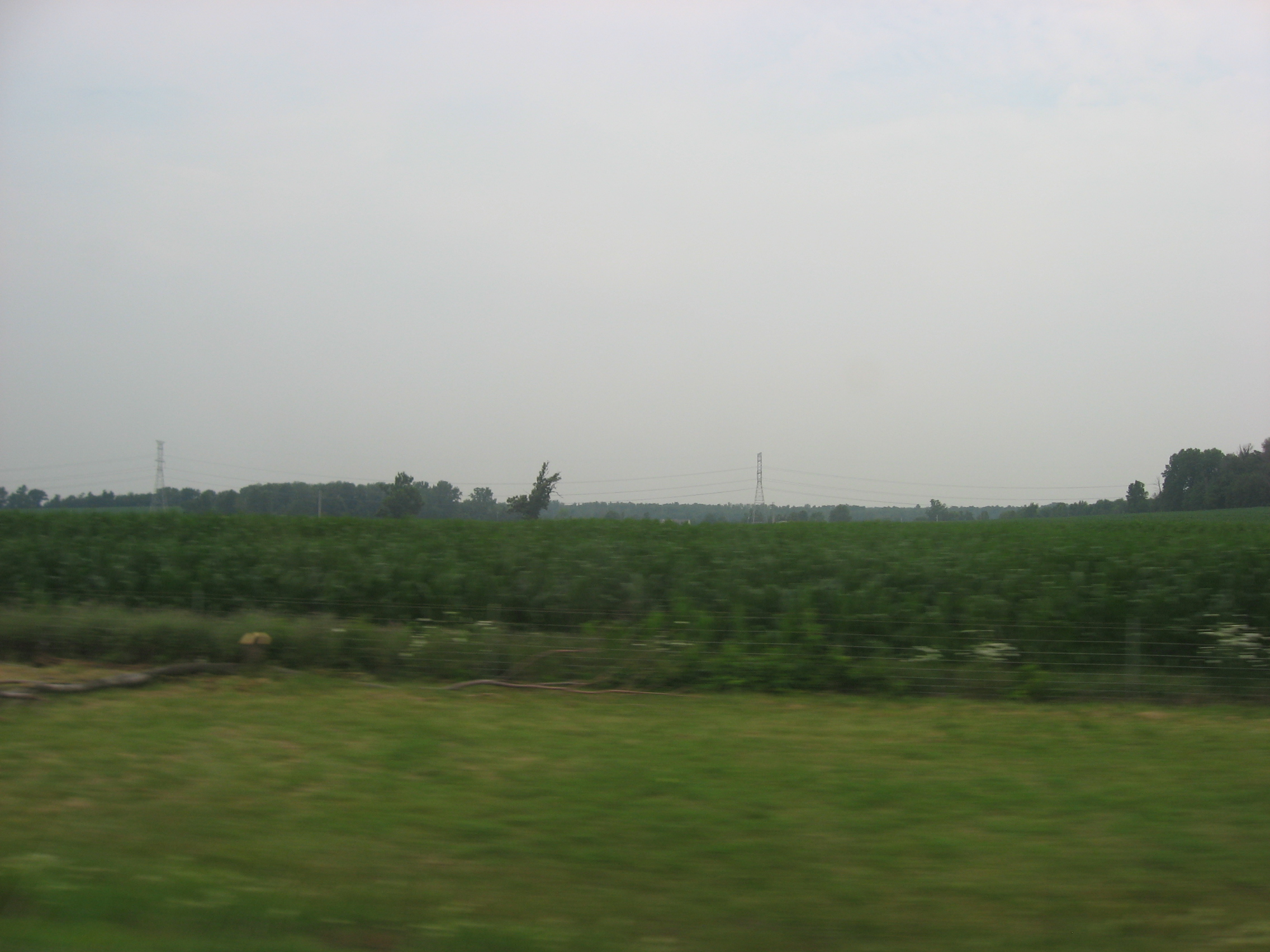
- Fields along the Ohio Turnpike in eastern Florence Township

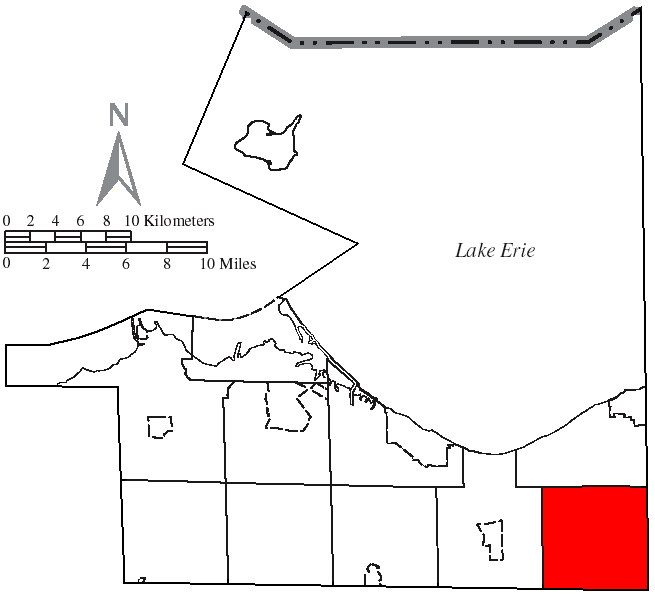
- Location of Florence Township in Erie County
- Coordinates: 41°19′23″N 82°23′18″W
- Country: United States
- State: Ohio
- County: Erie

Area
  - Total: 26.3 sq mi (68.2 km^{2})
  - Land: 26.1 sq mi (67.7 km^{2})
  - Water: 0.19 sq mi (0.5 km^{2})
- Elevation: 790 ft (240 m)

Population (2020)
  - Total: 2,470
  - Density: 94.5/sq mi (36.5/km^{2})
- Time zone: UTC-5 (Eastern (EST))
  - Summer (DST): UTC-4 (EDT)
- FIPS code: 39-27482
- GNIS feature ID: 1086062
- Website: florencetwperieoh.gov

Florence Township is one of the nine townships of Erie County, Ohio, United States. It is part of the Sandusky, Ohio metropolitan statistical area. As of the 2020 census, the population was 2,470.

== Geography ==
Located in the southeastern corner of the county, it borders the following townships:

- Vermilion Township - north
- Brownhelm Township, Lorain County - northeast corner
- Henrietta Township, Lorain County - east
- Wakeman Township, Huron County - south
- Townsend Township, Huron County - southwest corner
- Berlin Township - west

No municipalities are located in Florence Township, although the census-designated place of Birmingham is located in the township's east.

== Name and history ==
- Statewide, the only other Florence Township is located in Williams County.
- Florence Township was judicially independently organized in 1817. This township had been originally established about 1808 as "Jesup" Township, in honor of one of its original land-speculators; however, the township name was shortly later changed to "Florence" (due to that land-owner having fallen into disfavor with the pioneer-settlers who had purchased their farms from him).

== Government ==
The township is governed by a three-member board of trustees, who are elected in November of odd-numbered years to a four-year term beginning on the following January 1. Two are elected in the year after the presidential election and one is elected in the year before it. There is also an elected township fiscal officer, who serves a four-year term beginning on April 1 of the year after the election, which is held in November of the year before the presidential election. Vacancies in the fiscal officership or on the board of trustees are filled by the remaining trustees.
