= Birmingham, Erie County, Ohio =

Unincorporated community in Ohio, U.S.

Coordinates: 41°19′48″N 82°21′39″W

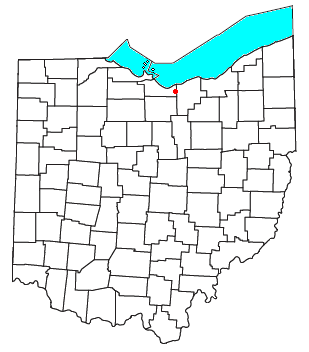
Location of Birmingham in Erie County, Ohio

Birmingham is an unincorporated community and Census-designated place in eastern Florence Township, Erie County, Ohio, United States. It is part of the Sandusky Metropolitan Statistical Area. It is located at the intersection of State Routes 60 and 113.

Birmingham was the original site of the Woollybear Festival.

== History ==
The community was named after Birmingham, England, for the fact its founders hoped the town eventually would boast an industrial base as famous as the English city's. A post office called Birmingham has been in operation since 1832.

On March 3, 2009, fire destroyed a restaurant and the post office in the community. Mail was rerouted to the post office in nearby Wakeman.
