= Fitchville Township, Huron County, Ohio =

Township in Ohio, US

- Township
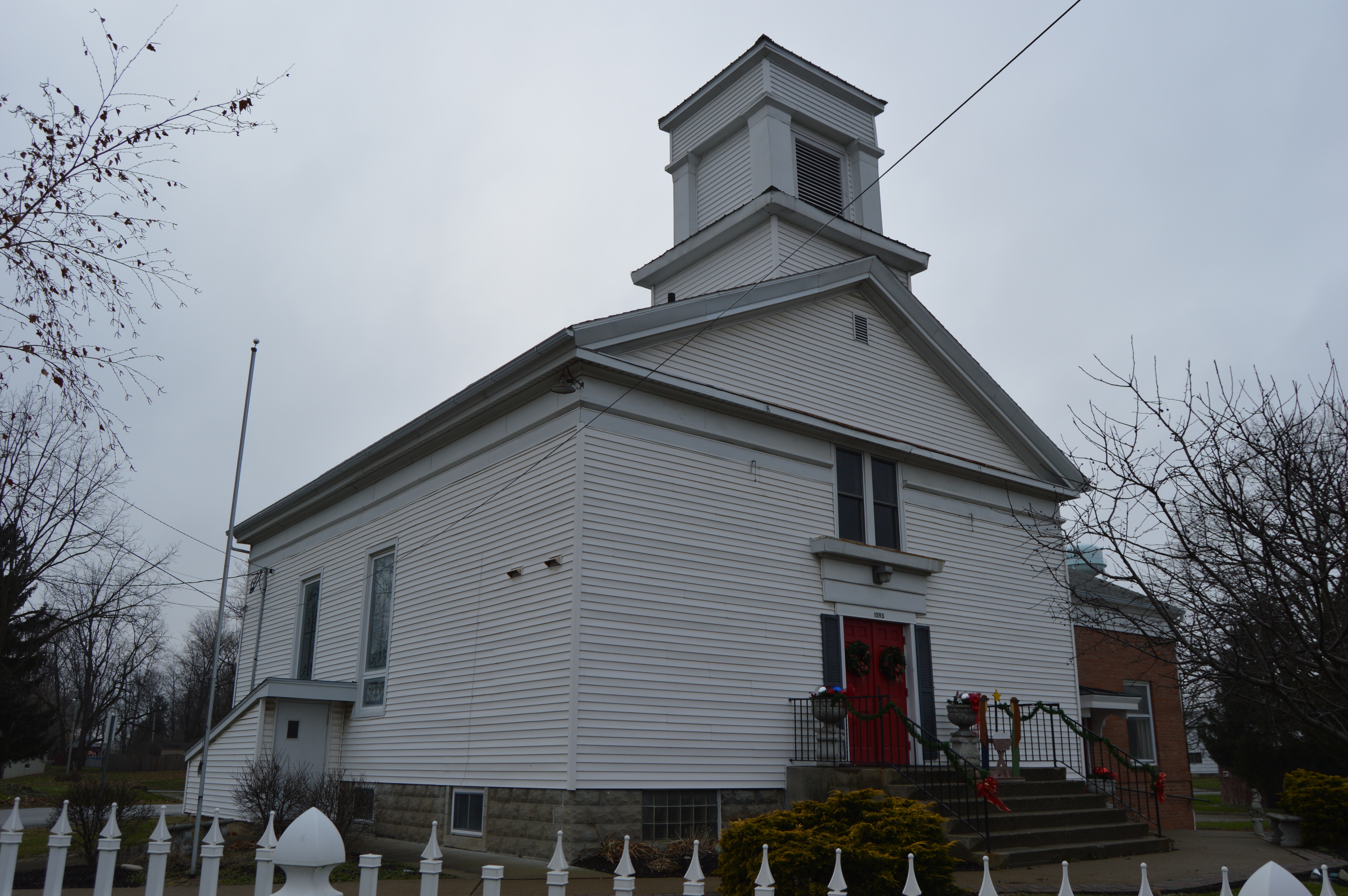
- Methodist church in Fitchville

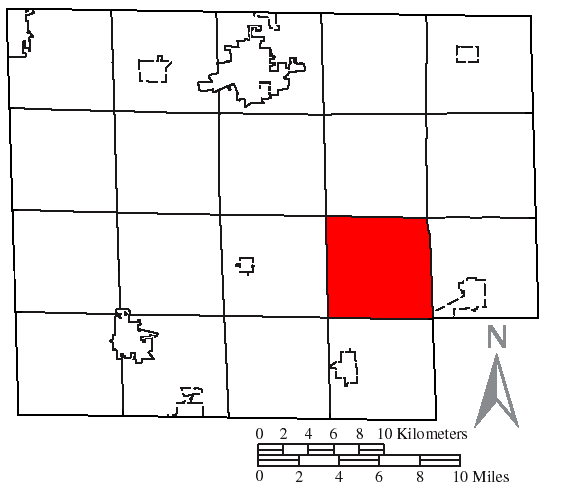
- Location of Fitchville Township in Huron County
- Coordinates: 41°5′45″N 82°28′59″W
- Country: United States
- State: Ohio
- County: Huron

Area
  - Total: 25.9 sq mi (67.2 km^{2})
  - Land: 25.9 sq mi (67.0 km^{2})
  - Water: 0.077 sq mi (0.2 km^{2})
- Elevation: 980 ft (300 m)

Population (2020)
  - Total: 1,046
  - Density: 40.4/sq mi (15.6/km^{2})
- Time zone: UTC-5 (Eastern (EST))
  - Summer (DST): UTC-4 (EDT)
- ZIP code: 44851
- Area code: 419
- FIPS code: 39-27216
- GNIS feature ID: 1086345

Fitchville Township is one of the nineteen townships of Huron County, Ohio, United States. As of the 2020 census the population of the township was 1,046.

== Geography ==
Located in the eastern part of the county, it borders the following townships:

- Hartland Township - north
- Clarksfield Township - northeast corner
- New London Township - east
- Ruggles Township, Ashland County - southeast corner
- Greenwich Township - south
- Ripley Township - southwest corner
- Fairfield Township - west
- Bronson Township - northwest corner

No municipalities are located in Fitchville Township.

== Name and history ==
Fitchville Township was established in 1828. The only Fitchville Township statewide, it is named for one Colonel Fitch, a landowner and native of Connecticut.

== Government ==
The township is governed by a three-member board of trustees, who are elected in November of odd-numbered years to a four-year term beginning on the following January 1. Two are elected in the year after the presidential election and one is elected in the year before it. There is also an elected township fiscal officer, who serves a four-year term beginning on April 1 of the year after the election, which is held in November of the year before the presidential election. Vacancies in the fiscal officership or on the board of trustees are filled by the remaining trustees.
