= Wakeman Township, Huron County, Ohio =

Township in Ohio, US

- Township
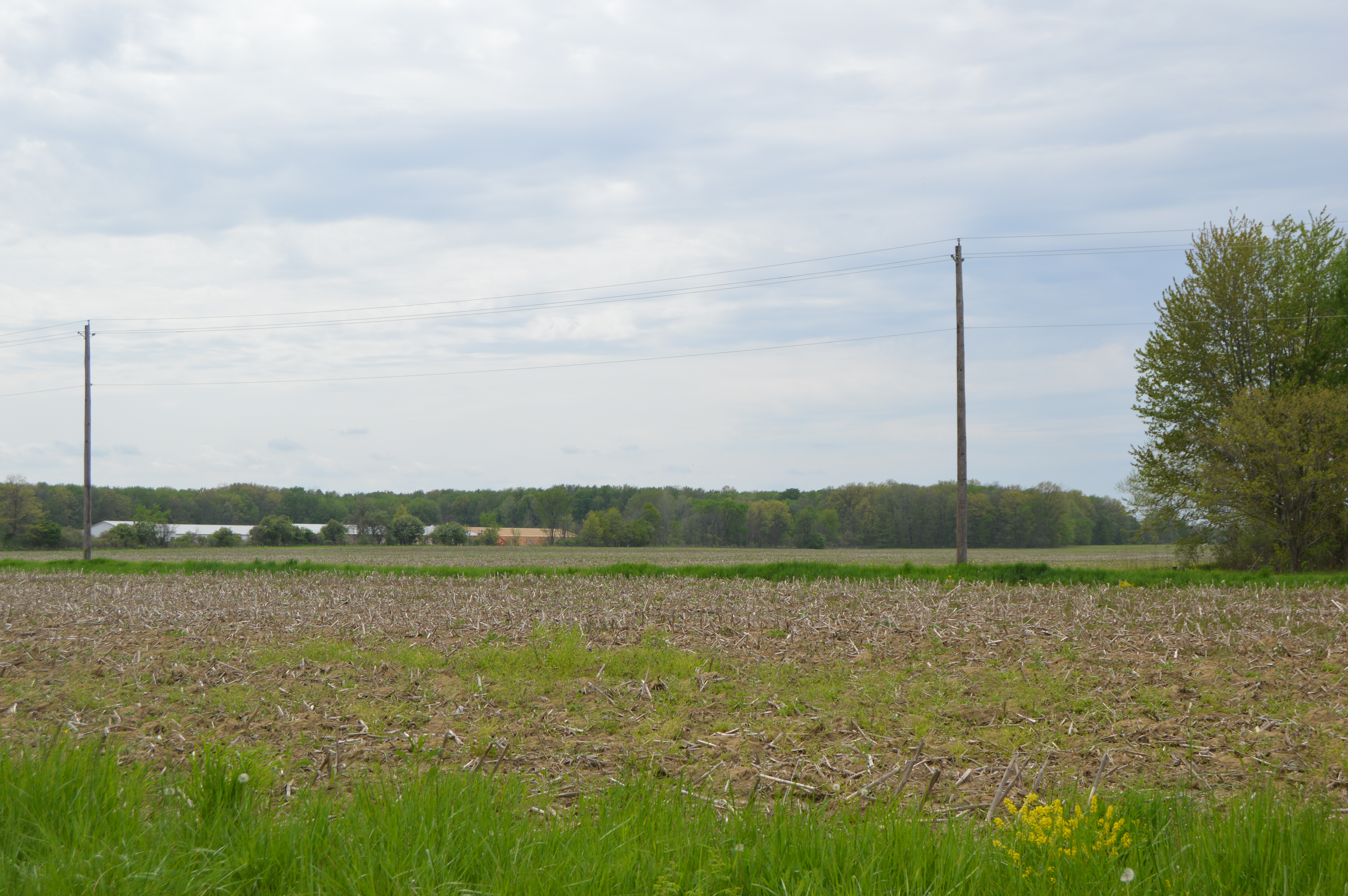
- Agricultural scene south of Wakeman

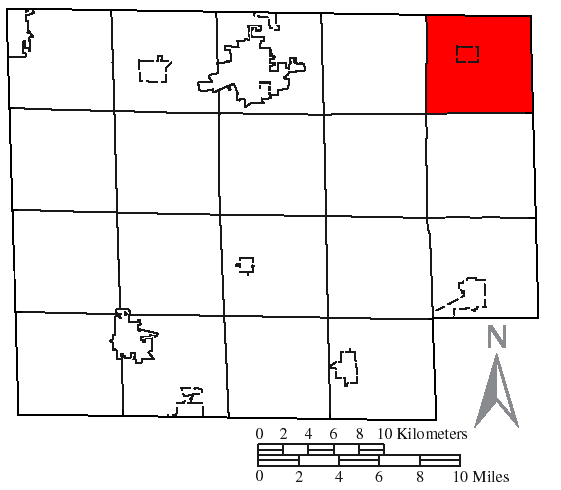
- Location of Wakeman Township in Huron County
- Coordinates: 41°15′20″N 82°23′48″W
- Country: United States
- State: Ohio
- County: Huron

Area
  - Total: 25.46 sq mi (65.95 km^{2})
  - Land: 25.23 sq mi (65.34 km^{2})
  - Water: 0.24 sq mi (0.61 km^{2})
- Elevation: 807 ft (246 m)

Population (2020)
  - Total: 2,761
  - Density: 109.4/sq mi (42.26/km^{2})
- Time zone: UTC-5 (Eastern (EST))
  - Summer (DST): UTC-4 (EDT)
- ZIP code: 44889
- Area code: 440
- FIPS code: 39-80472
- GNIS feature ID: 1086361
- Website: https://www.wakemantownship.com/

Wakeman Township is one of the nineteen townships of Huron County, Ohio, United States. As of the 2020 census the population of the township was 2,761.

== Geography ==
Located in the northeastern corner of the county, it borders the following townships:

- Florence Township, Erie County - north
- Henrietta Township, Lorain County - northeast
- Camden Township, Lorain County - east
- Clarksfield Township - south
- Hartland Township - southwest corner
- Townsend Township - west
- Berlin Township, Erie County - northwest corner

The village of Wakeman is located in central Wakeman Township.

== Name and history ==
Wakeman Township was organized in 1824. It was named for Jesup Wakeman, one of the first landowners there.

It is the only Wakeman Township statewide.

== Government ==
The township is governed by a three-member board of trustees, who are elected in November of odd-numbered years to a four-year term beginning on the following January 1. Two are elected in the year after the presidential election and one is elected in the year before it. There is also an elected township fiscal officer, who serves a four-year term beginning on April 1 of the year after the election, which is held in November of the year before the presidential election. Vacancies in the fiscal officership or on the board of trustees are filled by the remaining trustees.
