= Hartland Township, Huron County, Ohio =

Township in Ohio, US

- Township
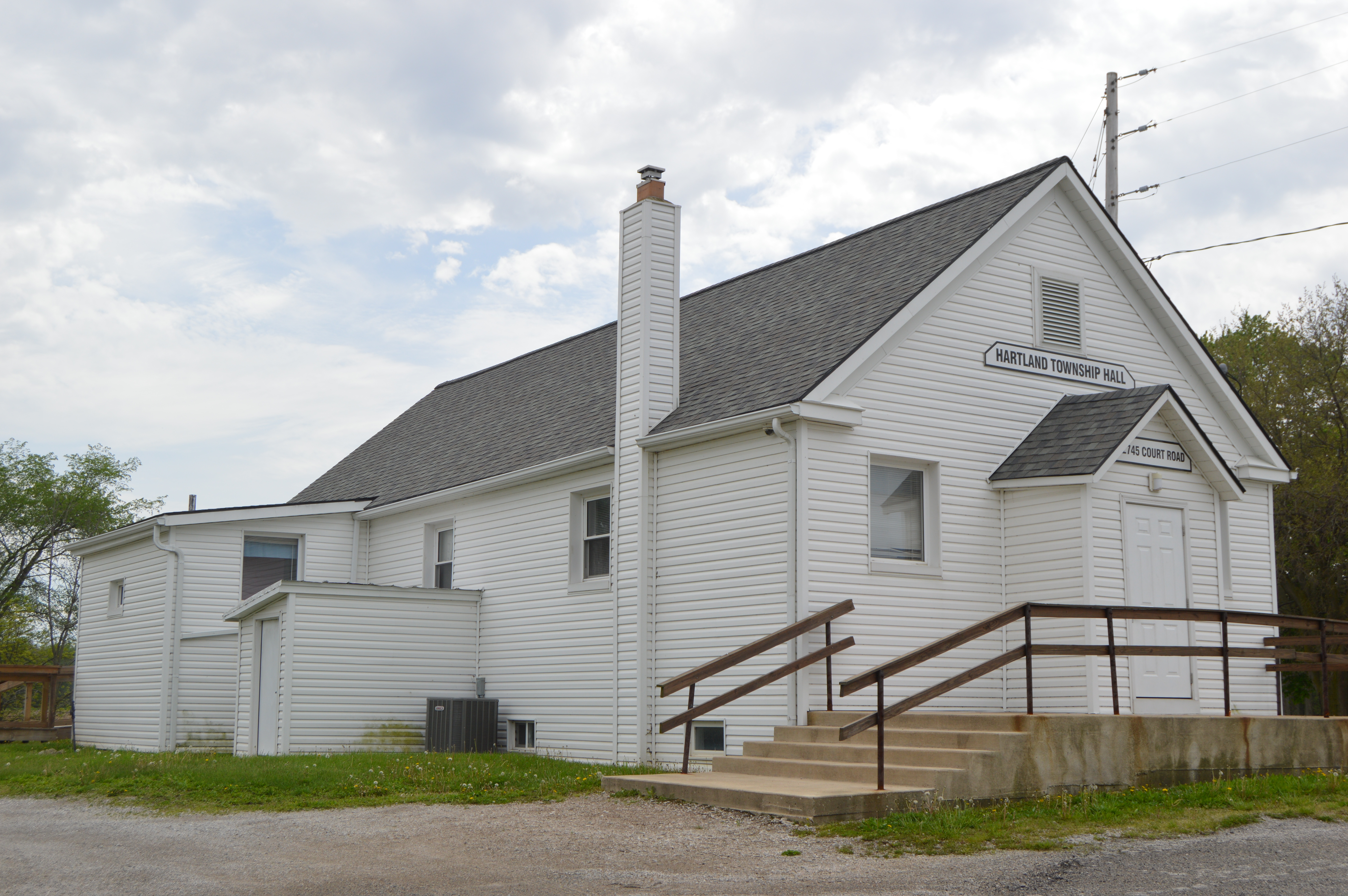
- Township hall at Hartland Center

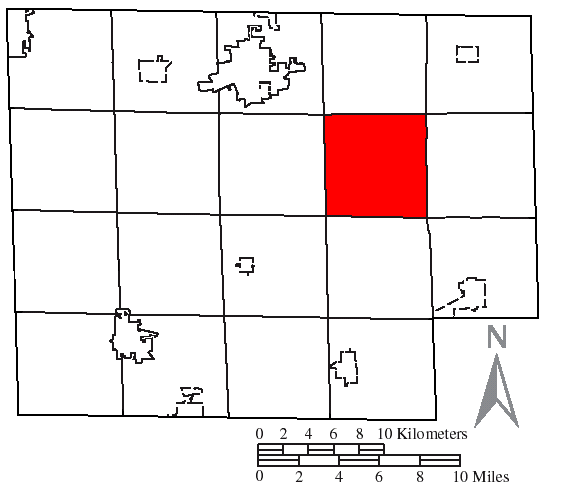
- Location of Hartland Township in Huron County
- Coordinates: 41°9′56″N 82°28′16″W
- Country: United States
- State: Ohio
- County: Huron

Area
  - Total: 26.1 sq mi (67.5 km^{2})
  - Land: 26.0 sq mi (67.4 km^{2})
  - Water: 0.039 sq mi (0.1 km^{2})
- Elevation: 945 ft (288 m)

Population (2020)
  - Total: 1,060
  - Density: 40.7/sq mi (15.7/km^{2})
- Time zone: UTC-5 (Eastern (EST))
  - Summer (DST): UTC-4 (EDT)
- ZIP code: 44857
- Area code: 419
- FIPS code: 39-34258
- GNIS feature ID: 1086348

Hartland Township is one of the nineteen townships of Huron County, Ohio, United States. As of the 2020 census the population of the township was 1,060.

== Geography ==
Located in the eastern part of the county, it borders the following townships:

- Townsend Township - north
- Wakeman Township - northeast corner
- Clarksfield Township - east
- New London Township - southeast corner
- Fitchville Township - south
- Fairfield Township - southwest corner
- Bronson Township - west
- Norwalk Township - northwest corner

No municipalities are located in Hartland Township.

== Name and history ==
Hartland Township was organized in 1826.

It is the only Hartland Township statewide.

== Government ==
The township is governed by a three-member board of trustees, who are elected in November of odd-numbered years to a four-year term beginning on the following January 1. Two are elected in the year after the presidential election and one is elected in the year before it. There is also an elected township fiscal officer, who serves a four-year term beginning on April 1 of the year after the election, which is held in November of the year before the presidential election. Vacancies in the fiscal officership or on the board of trustees are filled by the remaining trustees.
