= Townsend Township, Huron County, Ohio =

Township in Ohio, US

- Township
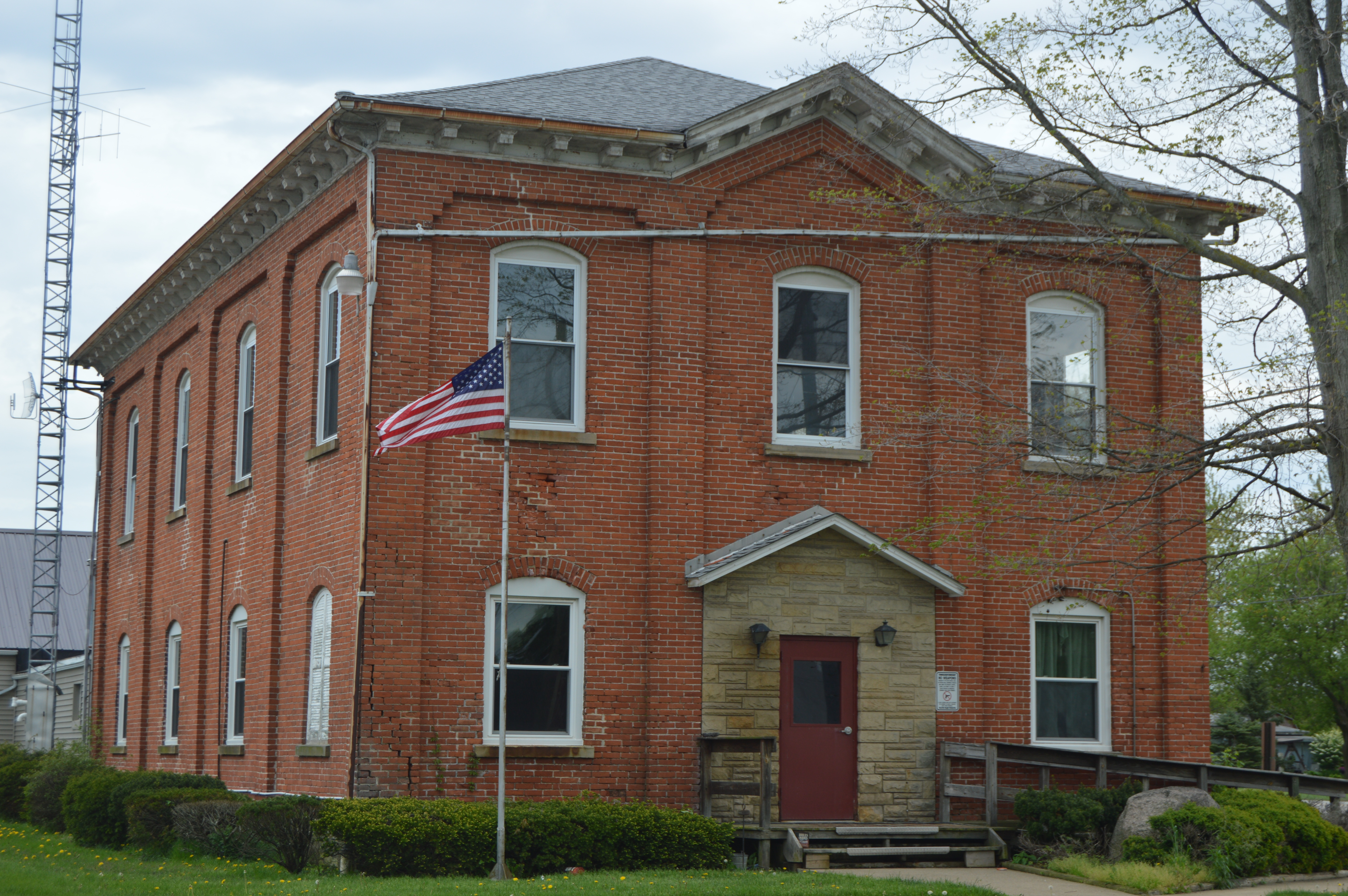
- Township hall near Collins

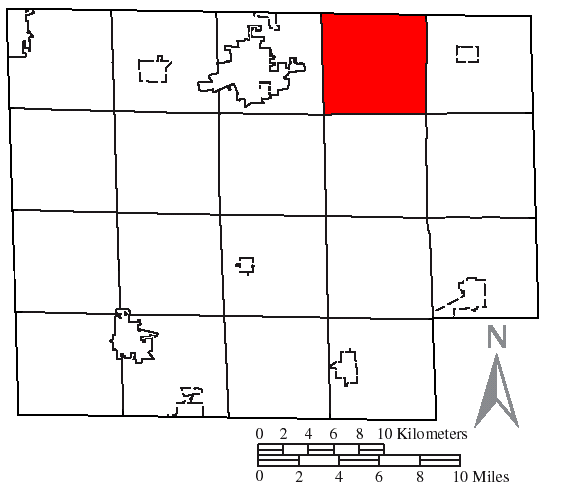
- Location of Townsend Township in Huron County
- Coordinates: 41°15′11″N 82°30′0″W
- Country: United States
- State: Ohio
- County: Huron

Area
  - Total: 25.8 sq mi (66.8 km^{2})
  - Land: 25.8 sq mi (66.7 km^{2})
  - Water: 0.039 sq mi (0.1 km^{2})
- Elevation: 899 ft (274 m)

Population (2020)
  - Total: 1,571
  - Density: 61.0/sq mi (23.6/km^{2})
- Time zone: UTC-5 (Eastern (EST))
  - Summer (DST): UTC-4 (EDT)
- FIPS code: 39-77158
- GNIS feature ID: 1086360

Townsend Township is one of the nineteen townships of Huron County, Ohio, United States. As of the 2020 census the population of the township was 1,571.

== Geography ==
Located on the northern edge of the county, it borders the following townships:

- Berlin Township, Erie County - north
- Florence Township, Erie County - northeast corner
- Wakeman Township - east
- Clarksfield Township - southeast corner
- Hartland Township - south
- Bronson Township - southwest corner
- Norwalk Township - west
- Milan Township, Erie County - northwest corner

No municipalities are located in Townsend Township, although the census-designated place of Collins lies at the center of the township.

== Name and history ==
Townsend Township was named for Kneeland Townsend, a large landowner. Townsend was a resident of New Haven, CT. East Haven, CT patriots whose homes were torched by Hessian and British troops on July 5, 1779, were awarded by CT colony land in the CT Western Reserve of Ohio. Townsend bought those 22,000 acres which he named after himself. He built a block home and traded with the Native Americans in the area.

Statewide, the only other Townsend Township is located in Sandusky County.

== Government ==
The township is governed by a three-member board of trustees, who are elected in November of odd-numbered years to a four-year term beginning on the following January 1. Two are elected in the year after the presidential election and one is elected in the year before it. There is also an elected township fiscal officer, who serves a four-year term beginning on April 1 of the year after the election, which is held in November of the year before the presidential election. Vacancies in the fiscal officership or on the board of trustees are filled by the remaining trustees.
