= Olena, Ohio =

Unincorporated community in Ohio, U.S.

Coordinates: 41°09′16″N 82°32′28″W

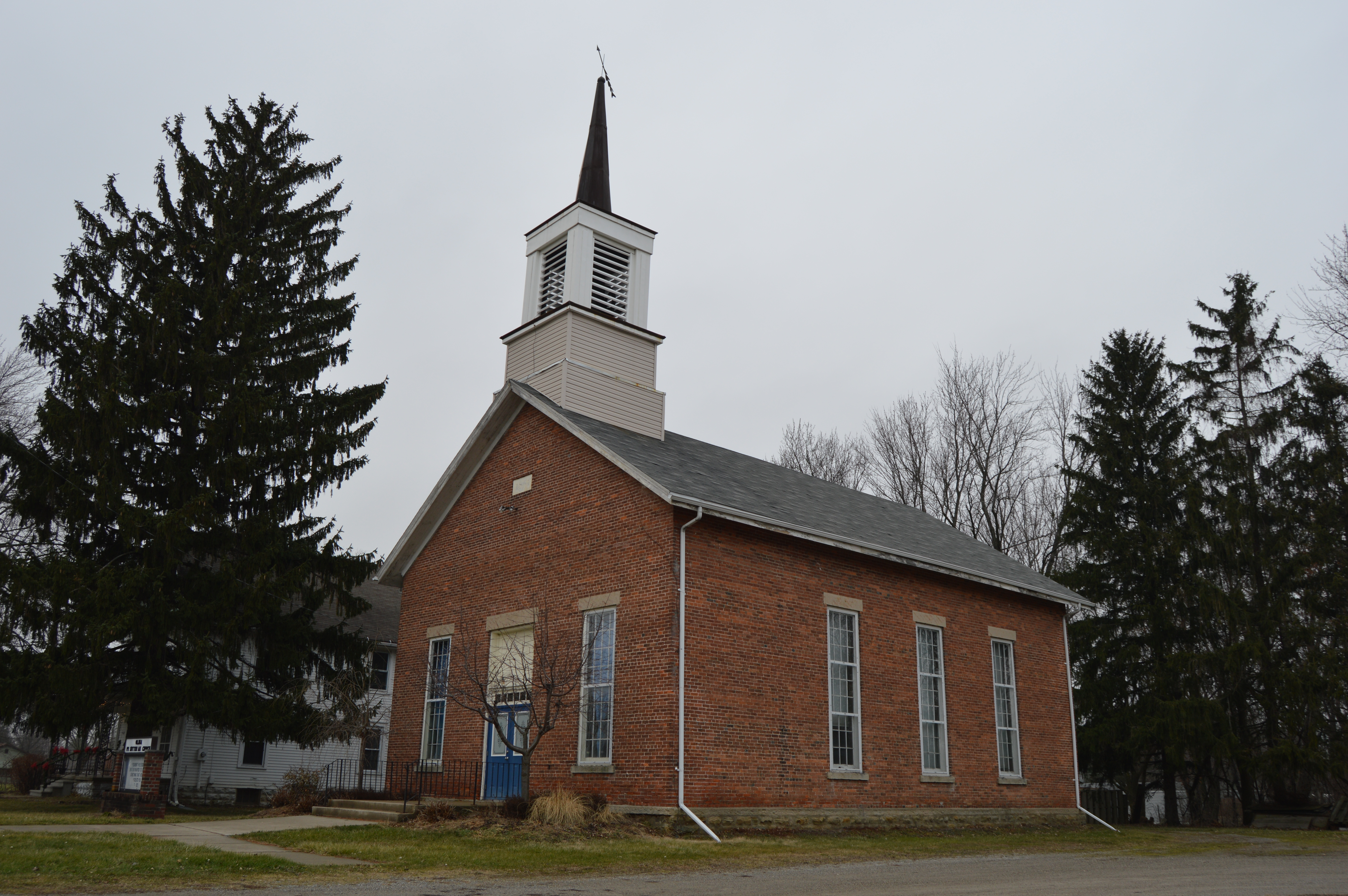
Olena Presbyterian Church

Olena is an unincorporated community in Huron County, Ohio, United States.

== History ==
The first settlement at Olena was made around 1832. A post office called North Fitchville was established in 1832, the name was changed to Olena in 1849, and the post office closed in 1932. The present name may be derived from Olean, New York.
