= Clarksfield Township, Ohio =

Township in Ohio, US

Clarksfield Township, Huron County, Ohio
- Township
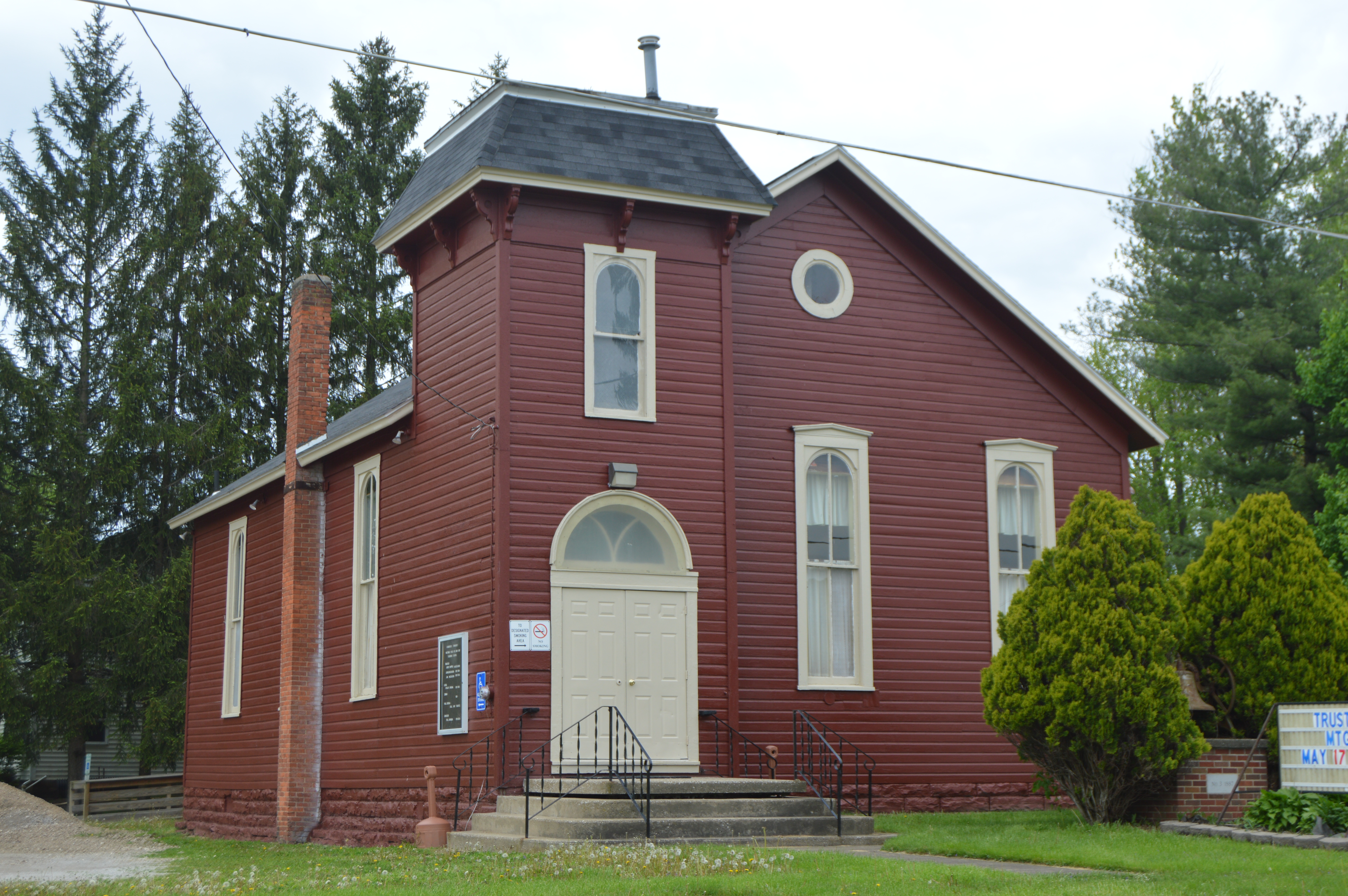
- Township hall at Clarksfield

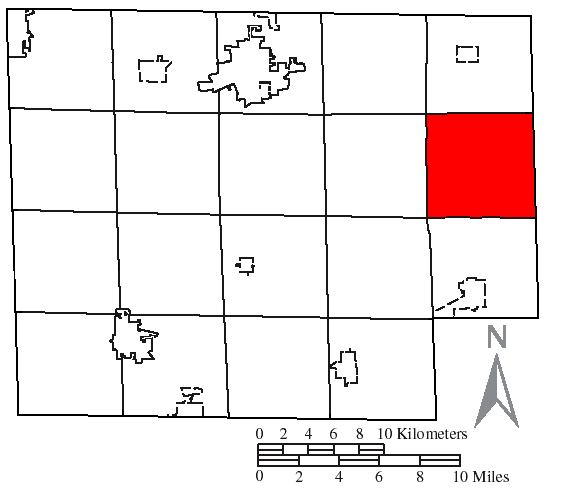
- Location of Clarksfield Township in Huron County
- Coordinates: 41°10′49″N 82°24′8″W
- Country: United States
- State: Ohio
- County: Huron

Area
  - Total: 26.5 sq mi (68.7 km^{2})
  - Land: 26.4 sq mi (68.4 km^{2})
  - Water: 0.12 sq mi (0.3 km^{2})
- Elevation: 922 ft (281 m)

Population (2020)
  - Total: 1,578
  - Density: 59.8/sq mi (23.1/km^{2})
- Time zone: UTC-5 (Eastern (EST))
  - Summer (DST): UTC-4 (EDT)
- ZIP code: 44889
- Area code: 440
- FIPS code: 39-15364
- GNIS feature ID: 1086343

Clarksfield Township is one of the nineteen townships of Huron County, Ohio, United States. As of the 2020 census the population of the township was 1,578.

== Geography ==
Located on the eastern edge of the county, it borders the following townships:

- Wakeman Township - north
- Camden Township, Lorain County - northeast
- Brighton Township, Lorain County - east
- Rochester Township, Lorain County - southeast corner
- New London Township - south
- Fitchville Township - southwest corner
- Hartland Township - west
- Townsend Township - northwest corner

No municipalities are located in Clarksfield Township, although the unincorporated community of Clarksfield lies in the township's northwest.

== Name and history ==
Clarksfield Township was named for James Clark, a hero of the Revolutionary War.

It is the only Clarksfield Township statewide.

== Government ==
The township is governed by a three-member board of trustees, who are elected in November of odd-numbered years to a four-year term beginning on the following January 1. Two are elected in the year after the presidential election and one is elected in the year before it. There is also an elected township fiscal officer, who serves a four-year term beginning on April 1 of the year after the election, which is held in November of the year before the presidential election. Vacancies in the fiscal officership or on the board of trustees are filled by the remaining trustees.
