= Norwalk Township, Huron County, Ohio =

Township in Ohio, US

- Township
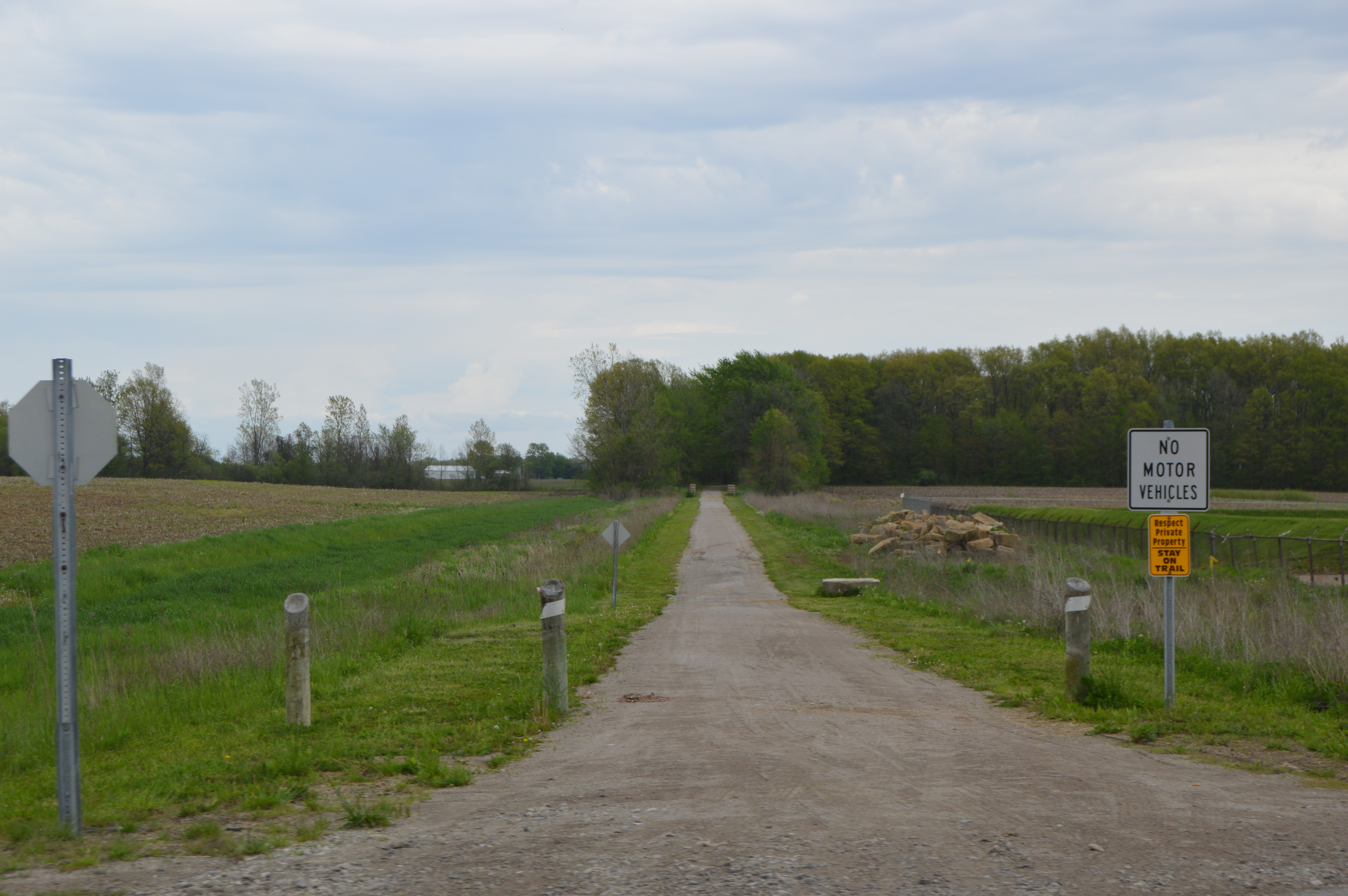
- The North Coast Inland Trail northeast of Norwalk

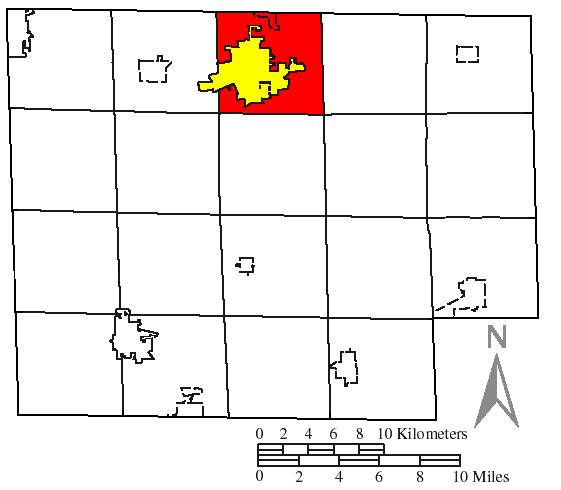
- Location of Norwalk Township (red) in Huron County, next to the city of Norwalk (yellow)
- Coordinates: 41°15′5″N 82°35′24″W
- Country: United States
- State: Ohio
- County: Huron

Area
  - Total: 17.7 sq mi (45.8 km^{2})
  - Land: 17.6 sq mi (45.6 km^{2})
  - Water: 0.077 sq mi (0.2 km^{2})
- Elevation: 768 ft (234 m)

Population (2020)
  - Total: 3,451
  - Density: 196/sq mi (75.7/km^{2})
- Time zone: UTC-5 (Eastern (EST))
  - Summer (DST): UTC-4 (EDT)
- ZIP code: 44857
- Area code: 419
- FIPS code: 39-57316
- GNIS feature ID: 1086353

Norwalk Township is one of the nineteen townships of Huron County, Ohio, United States. As of the 2020 census the population of the township was 3,451.

== Geography ==
Located on the northern edge of the county, it borders the following townships:

- Milan Township, Erie County - north
- Berlin Township, Erie County - northeast corner
- Townsend Township - east
- Hartland Township - southeast corner
- Bronson Township - south
- Peru Township - southwest corner
- Ridgefield Township - west
- Oxford Township, Erie County - northwest corner

Two municipalities are located in Norwalk Township: most of the city of Norwalk — the county seat of Huron County — occupying the majority of the township, and part of the village of Milan in the north.

== Name and history ==
Norwalk Township was named after Norwalk, Connecticut.

It is the only Norwalk Township statewide.

== Government ==
The township is governed by a three-member board of trustees, who are elected in November of odd-numbered years to a four-year term beginning on the following January 1. Two are elected in the year after the presidential election and one is elected in the year before it. There is also an elected township fiscal officer, who serves a four-year term beginning on April 1 of the year after the election, which is held in November of the year before the presidential election. Vacancies in the fiscal officership or on the board of trustees are filled by the remaining trustees.
