= Greenwich Township, Huron County, Ohio =

Township in Ohio, US

- Township
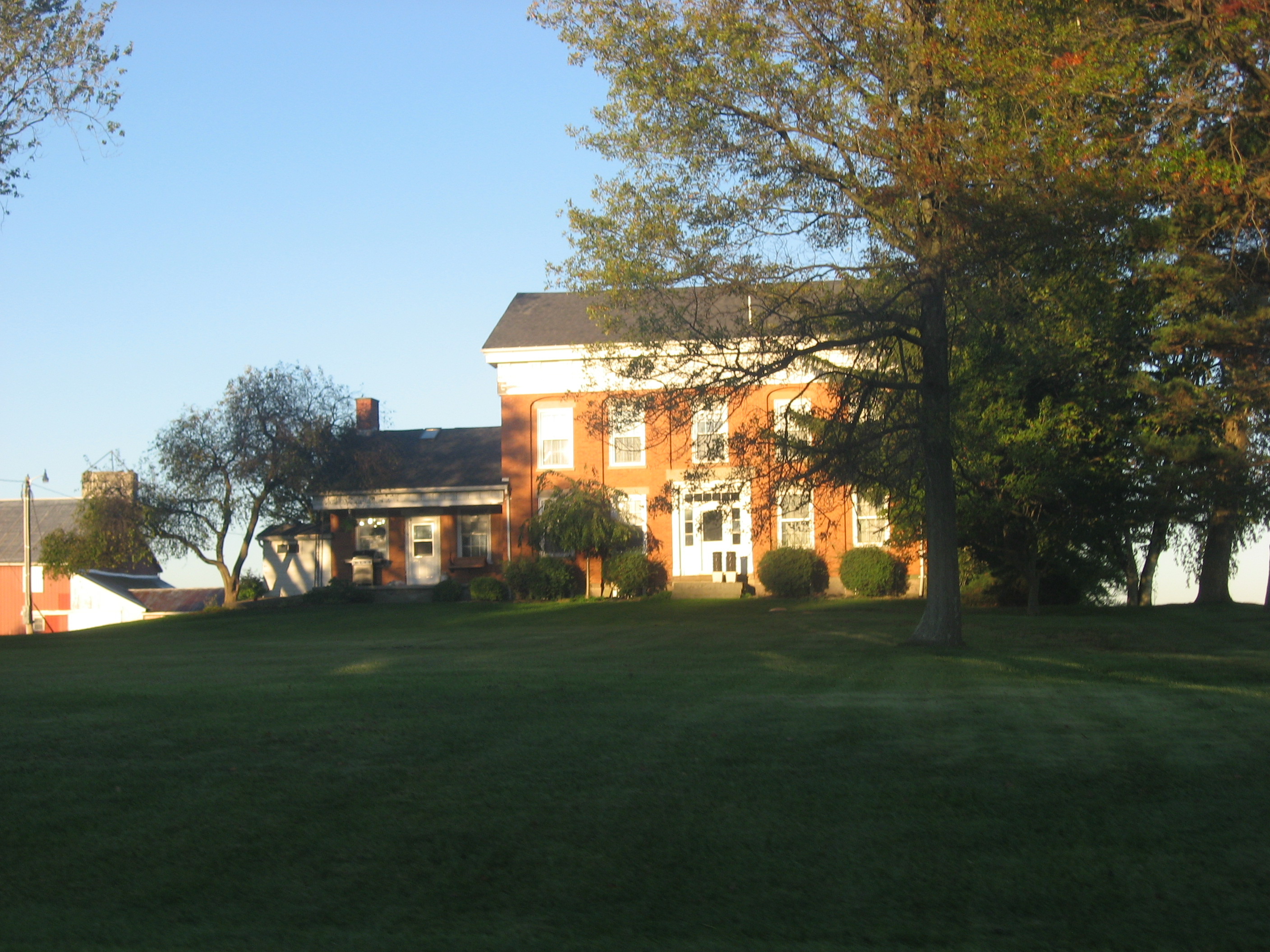
- The Mead-Zimmerman Farmhouse on State Route 13

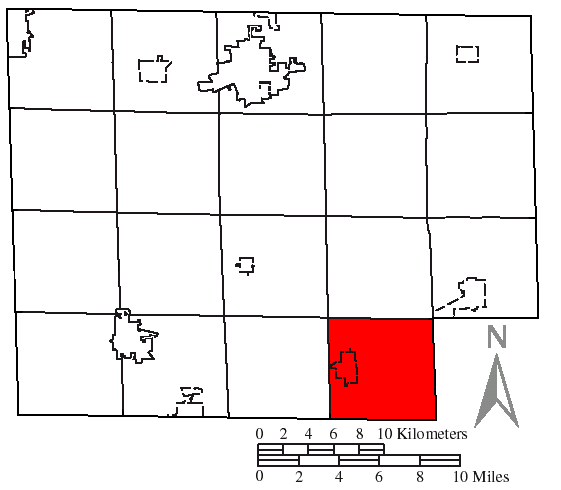
- Location of Greenwich Township in Huron County
- Coordinates: 41°2′34″N 82°29′29″W
- Country: United States
- State: Ohio
- County: Huron

Area
  - Total: 25.0 sq mi (64.8 km^{2})
  - Land: 24.9 sq mi (64.5 km^{2})
  - Water: 0.12 sq mi (0.3 km^{2})
- Elevation: 1,043 ft (318 m)

Population (2020)
  - Total: 1,002
  - Density: 40.2/sq mi (15.5/km^{2})
- Time zone: UTC-5 (Eastern (EST))
  - Summer (DST): UTC-4 (EDT)
- ZIP code: 44837
- Area code: 419
- FIPS code: 39-32382
- GNIS feature ID: 1086347

Greenwich Township is one of the nineteen townships of Huron County, Ohio, United States. As of the 2020 census the population of the township was 1,002.

== Geography ==
Located on the southern edge of the county, it borders the following townships:

- Fitchville Township - north
- New London Township - northeast corner
- Ruggles Township, Ashland County - east
- Butler Township, Richland County - southeast
- Blooming Grove Township, Richland County - southwest
- Ripley Township - west
- Fairfield Township - northwest corner

The village of Greenwich, a separate municipality, is located in western Greenwich Township.

== Name and history ==
Greenwich Township was named after Greenwich, Connecticut, the hometown of many of its pioneer settlers.

It is the only Greenwich Township statewide.

== Government ==
The township is governed by a three-member board of trustees, who are elected in November of odd-numbered years to a four-year term beginning on the following January 1. Two are elected in the year after the presidential election and one is elected in the year before it. There is also an elected township fiscal officer, who serves a four-year term beginning on April 1 of the year after the election, which is held in November of the year before the presidential election. Vacancies in the fiscal officership or on the board of trustees are filled by the remaining trustees.
