= Ripley Township, Huron County, Ohio =

Township in Ohio, US

- Township
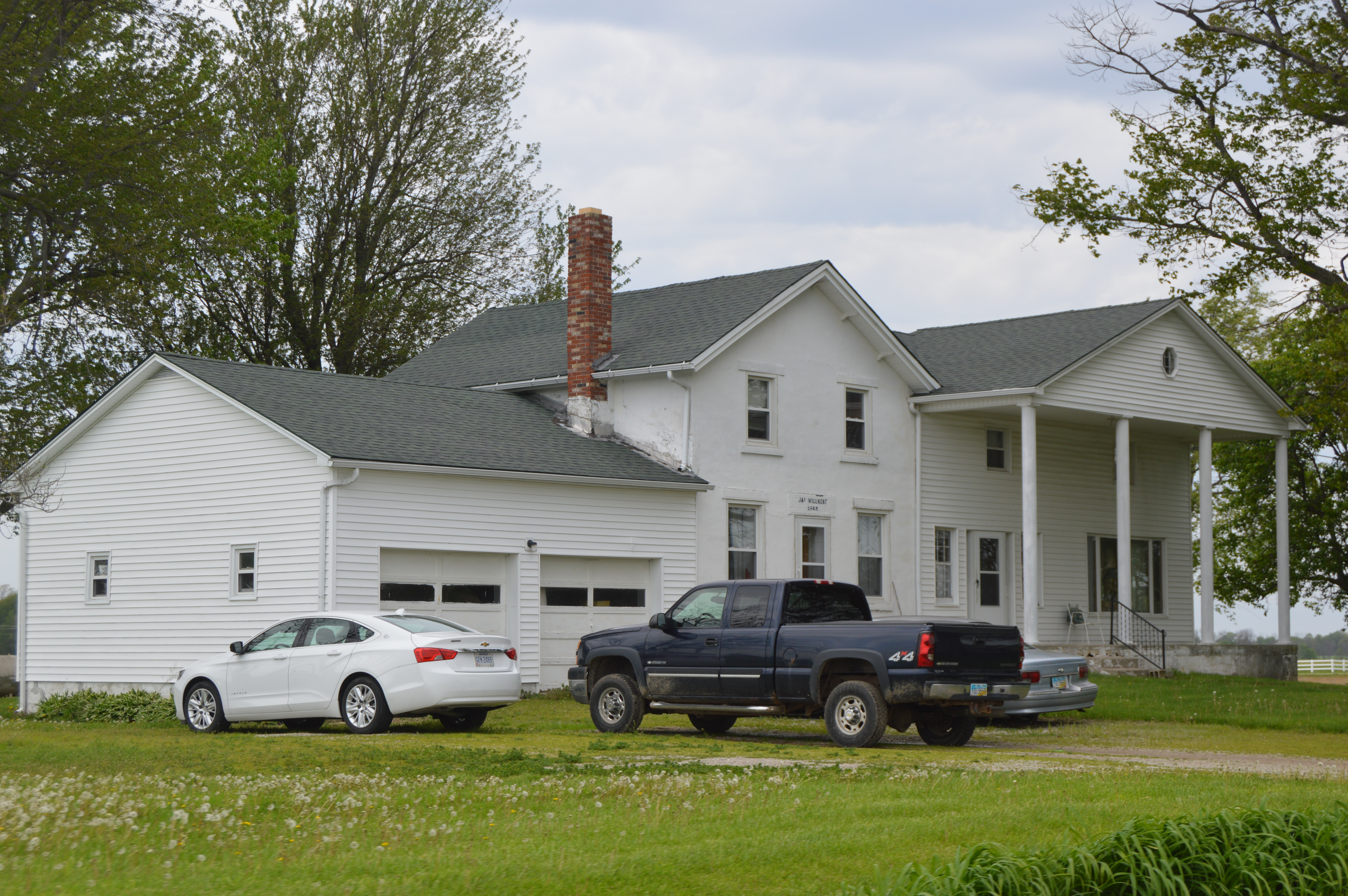
- 1849 farmhouse on New State Road

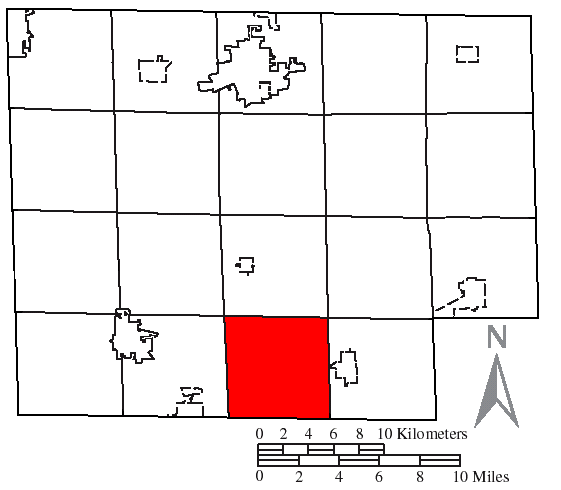
- Location of Ripley Township in Huron County
- Coordinates: 41°1′35″N 82°34′19″W
- Country: United States
- State: Ohio
- County: Huron

Area
  - Total: 25.66 sq mi (66.45 km^{2})
  - Land: 25.59 sq mi (66.27 km^{2})
  - Water: 0.069 sq mi (0.18 km^{2})
- Elevation: 1,053 ft (321 m)

Population (2020)
  - Total: 1,116
  - Density: 43.62/sq mi (16.84/km^{2})
- Time zone: UTC-5 (Eastern (EST))
  - Summer (DST): UTC-4 (EDT)
- FIPS code: 39-67300
- GNIS feature ID: 1086358

Ripley Township is one of the nineteen townships of Huron County, Ohio, United States. As of the 2020 census the population of the township was 1,116.

== Geography ==
Located on the southern edge of the county, it borders the following townships:

- Fairfield Township - north
- Fitchville Township - northeast corner
- Greenwich Township - east
- Blooming Grove Township, Richland County - southeast
- Cass Township, Richland County - southwest
- New Haven Township - west
- Greenfield Township - northwest corner

No municipalities are located in Ripley Township.

== Name and history ==
Ripley Township was named for Rev. Hezekiah Ripley, a pioneer settler.

Statewide, the only other Ripley Township is located in Holmes County.

== Government ==
The township is governed by a three-member board of trustees, who are elected in November of odd-numbered years to a four-year term beginning on the following January 1. Two are elected in the year after the presidential election and one is elected in the year before it. There is also an elected township fiscal officer, who serves a four-year term beginning on April 1 of the year after the election, which is held in November of the year before the presidential election. Vacancies in the fiscal officership or on the board of trustees are filled by the remaining trustees.
