= Margaretta High School =

Location
- 209 Lowell Street; Castalia, (Erie County), Ohio 44824; United States
- 41°23′57″N 82°48′5″W

Information
- Type: Public, coeducational high school
- Superintendent: Ed Kurt
- Principal: Jennifer Theis
- Teaching staff: 32.00 (FTE)
- Grades: 6-12
- Student to teacher ratio: 16.88
- Color
- Athletics: 12 sports
- Athletics conference: Sandusky Bay Conference
- Sports: Cross Country, Football, Golf, Wrestling, Basketball, Swimming, Track and Field, Baseball, Softball
- Mascot: Polar Bear
- Team name: Polar Bears
- Rival: Perkins High School, Clyde High School, Huron High School, Edison High School
- Newspaper: Polar Press
- Yearbook: Polaris
- Communities served: Bay Bridge, Bay View, Castalia, Crystal Rock, Margaretta Township, Parkertown, Townsend Township, Vickery, Whites Landing
- Feeder schools: Margaretta Elementary School, Margaretta Middle School
- Website: http://www.margaretta.k12.oh.us

Margaretta High School is a public high school in Castalia, Ohio. It is the only high school in the Margaretta Local Schools district. They are members of the Sandusky Bay Conference.

== Athletics ==
=== State championships ===
- Boys basketball – 1932
- Boys track and field – 2026
