= Edison Local School District (Erie County) =

School district in Ohio

The Edison Local School District (known as the Berlin-Milan Local School District prior to 2011) is a school district in Erie County and Huron County in north central Ohio serving the municipalities of Berlin Heights, Milan, and parts of Norwalk as well as parts of the townships of Berlin, Florence, Huron, Milan, Norwalk, Oxford, Perkins, and Vermilion.

Edison High School is located east of Milan on State Route 113. The sports teams are known as the Chargers.
