= Spacecraft Propulsion Research Facility =

- Spacecraft Propulsion Research Facility (B-2)
- U.S. National Register of Historic Places
- U.S. National Historic Landmark
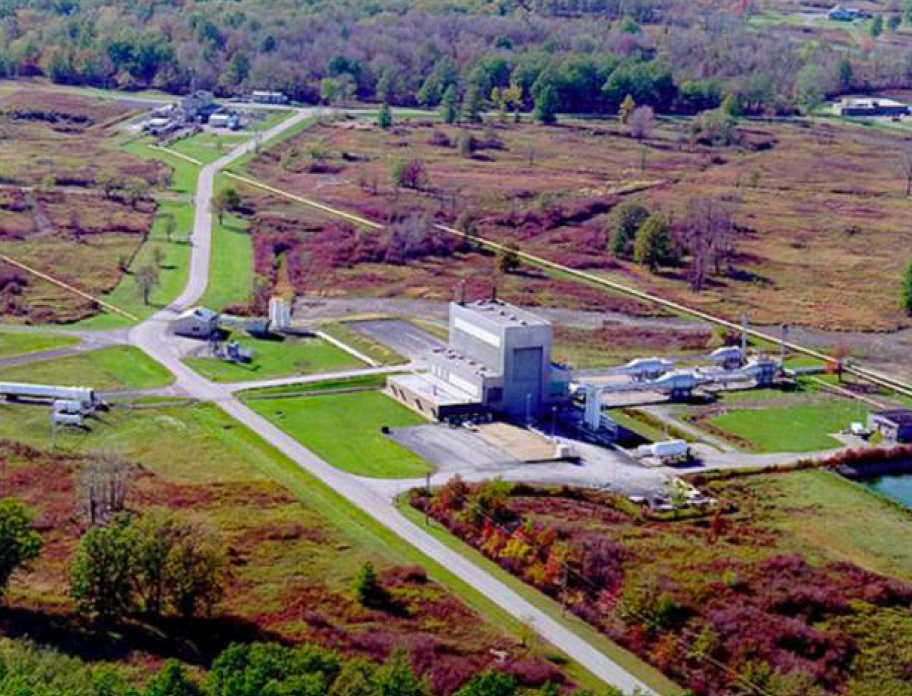
- Facility aerial view

- Location within Ohio Location within the United States
- Location: Erie County, Ohio
- Coordinates: 41°22′1″N 82°41′1″W
- Area: less than one acre
- Built: 1968
- Architect: NASA
- NRHP reference No.: 85002802
- Added to NRHP: October 3, 1985

The Spacecraft Propulsion Research Facility, now known as the In-Space Propulsion Facility, is (according to NASA), the "world’s only facility capable of testing full-scale upper-stage launch vehicles and rocket engines under simulated high-altitude conditions." The facility, located at NASA's Neil A. Armstrong Test Facility of the Glenn Research Center near Sandusky, Ohio, was built in 1968. Its first major use was for testing stages of the Centaur Rocket, which was used to launch some of America's most important space probes. The facility was designated a National Historic Landmark in 1985.

== Description and history ==
NASA's Neil A. Armstrong Test Facility is located off Taylor Road, between Bloomingville and Bogart, south of Sandusky, Ohio. This remote site was established by NASA to facilitate large-scale testing of dangerous equipment. The In-Space Propulsion Facility, designed to perform full-scale test-firing of large rockets, is one of several facilities at the station. It consists of a building housing its main test chamber, a test equipment building, and fueling and exhaust facilities associated with the firing of rockets within the test chamber. The main chamber is a steel cylinder designed to house test subjects up to 22 feet (6.7 m) in diameter and 50 feet (15 m) in height. A door 27 feet (8.2 m) high provides access for bringing equipment into the chamber, which is equipped with several viewports through which remote viewing apparatus can observe the test. The chamber has a cooling wall capable of being maintained at −320 °F (−195.6 °C), cooled by liquid nitrogen. Infrared lamps simulate radiation environments found in space, and the chamber is capable of being having its pressure reduced to the equivalent of 100 miles (160 km) of altitude. Engines in the test chamber can generate a thrust up to 400,000 pounds.

The facility was built in 1968 as part of the Centaur development. These upper-stage rockets (launched on Atlas V first stages) needed to be capable of firing at high altitude to launch their payloads out of Earth orbit. More than ten tests of Centaur rockets here enabled the later successful launches in the Pioneer, Voyager, and Viking programs.

== See also ==
- National Register of Historic Places listings in Erie County, Ohio
- List of National Historic Landmarks in Ohio
- Zero Gravity Research Facility, located at NASA's Glenn Research Center, Lewis Field location in Cleveland, Ohio.
