= Bogart, Ohio =

Unincorporated community in Ohio, U.S.

Coordinates: 41°23′45″N 82°39′04″W

Bogart is an unincorporated community in eastern Perkins Township, south of Sandusky, in Erie County, Ohio, United States. It is centered on the intersection of Bogart Road and U.S. Route 250, 1,500 feet south of the State Route 2 interchange with US 250. The center of Bogart is also 1,500 feet west of the boundary between Perkins and Huron townships. Bogart is pronounced locally boh-girt. It is part of the Sandusky Metropolitan Statistical Area.

Prior to 1957, Bogart was a fairly quiet rural community. To the southwest, though, lay an unused tract of 9,000 acres (36 km^{2}) that had been the site of a World War II munitions factory. In 1957 NASA acquired part of this tract for its Plum Brook Station and by 1963 had acquired the rest of the tract to build additional facilities there.

Plum Brook Station brought unprecedented growth to Bogart in the form of single-family housing subdivisions, condominium apartments, motels, restaurants and other businesses. Kalahari Resort and Convention Center is located one mile south of Bogart on the east side of US 250. On December 21, 2007, Kalahari Sandusky completed a major expansion of its indoor waterpark and now bills itself "America's Largest Indoor Waterpark.

== Transportation ==
US 250 is the main north-south highway through Bogart, while State Route 2 is the major east-west limited-access highway through the area. Bogart Road also runs east-west from Huron on the east to Castalia on the west. Taylor Road used to run southwest to Bloomingville from US 250 just south of Bogart Road, but it is now interrupted by Plum Brook Station.
