= Avery, Ohio =

Unincorporated community in Ohio, U.S.

Coordinates: 41°19′40″N 82°37′15″W

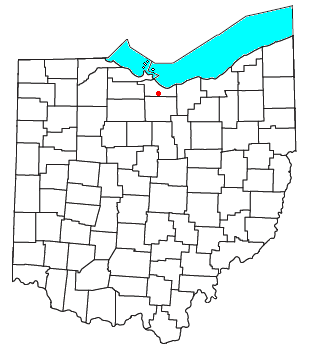
Location of Avery, Ohio

Avery is an unincorporated community in western Milan Township, Erie County, Ohio, United States. It is part of the Sandusky Metropolitan Statistical Area. Avery is located along US Route 250 near that road's interchange with Interstate 80 and Interstate 90, the Ohio Turnpike. It once had a post office, but is now included in the Milan, Ohio postal zone (44846).

== History ==
The current community called Avery, is all that remains of a village formerly known as Spears Corners. Avery takes its name from "Avery Township" (the original name of Milan Township) in Erie County

This present community of Avery is often confused with the first county seat of Huron County, in the State of Ohio which was technically called the "town plat of Huron" (occupied from 1815 to circa-1821); this was instead almost due east of the present Avery, but on the east side of the Huron River. The confusion arises due to the prior early historical usage of the word 'town', at that time meaning "township", and 'town plat' meaning "village". Likewise, the current city of Huron, Ohio, is often misunderstood to have been the former 'town plat of Huron'.

The area currently known as Avery was the name given to a railroad passenger depot built in 1882 by the New York, Chicago and St. Louis Railroad where it crossed the Norwalk-Sandusky Road that became U.S. Route 250. In 1893, it became a stop on the Sandusky, Milan and Norwalk interurban electric railroad, (similar to a city's "streetcar") later becoming part of the Lake Shore Electric Railway system.

== Notable person ==
- Charles A. Hawley (1861-1929), dentist
