= Townsend Township, Ohio =

Townsend Township, Ohio may refer to:

- Townsend Township, Huron County, Ohio
- Townsend Township, Sandusky County, Ohio
