= Axtel, Ohio =

Coordinates: 41°22′07″N 82°21′50″W

Axtel is an unincorporated community in Vermilion Township, Erie County, Ohio, United States. It is part of the Sandusky Metropolitan Statistical Area. It is located at the intersection of State Route 60 and Mason Road. The reason that it is called Axtel is unknown.
