= Edison High School (Milan, Ohio) =

Location
- Milan, Ohio 44846; United States; 41°17′58″N 82°34′27″W

Information
- Type: Public
- Established: 1968
- School district: Edison Local School District
- NCES School ID: 390467802653
- Principal: Jeff Goodwin
- Teaching staff: 21.05 (FTE)
- Grades: 9-12
- Enrollment: 329 (2024–25)
- Student to teacher ratio: 15.63
- Campus type: Rural
- Colors: Blue and orange
- Athletics conference: Northern Ohio Conference
- Team name: Chargers
- Rival: Huron Tigers
- Accreditation: Ohio Department of Education
- Website: www.edisonchargers.org/ehs_home.aspx

Edison High School is a public high school in Milan Township, near the village of Milan, Ohio. It is the only high school in the Edison Local School District. It is named for inventor Thomas Edison, who was born in Milan. Edison was created in 1968 when the school districts from Berlin Heights and Milan consolidated.

== Athletics ==
Athletic teams are known as the Chargers compete in the Northern Ohio Conference and wear the colors of blue and orange. They had previously competed in the Sandusky Bay Conference from 1986 to 2026 and the Firelands Conference from 1968 to 1986. Prior to the consolidation, Berlin Heights and Milan had helped form the Firelands Conference in 1960.

== State championships ==
- Boys track and field – 2002
- Girls golf - 2016
- Boys wrestling - 2017, 2020, 2024
