= Beulah Beach, Ohio =

- Census-designated place
- Location within Ohio
- Coordinates: 41°23′31″N 82°26′35″W
- Country: United States
- State: Ohio
- County: Erie
- Township: Vermilion

Area
  - Total: 0.046 sq mi (0.12 km^{2})
  - Land: 0.046 sq mi (0.12 km^{2})
  - Water: 0 sq mi (0.00 km^{2})
- Elevation: 600 ft (180 m)

Population (2020)
  - Total: 75
  - Density: 1,634.0/sq mi (630.88/km^{2})
- Time zone: UTC-5 (Eastern (EST))
  - Summer (DST): UTC-4 (EDT)
- ZIP code: 44089
- Area code: 419 / 567
- FIPS code: 39-06208
- GNIS feature ID: 2628865
- Website: www.beulahbeach.org

Beulah Beach (/ˈbjuːlə/ BEW-lə) is an unincorporated community and census-designated place located adjacent to Lake Erie in Erie County, Ohio, United States. As of the 2020 census it had a population of 75. It is located within Vermilion Township.

== History ==
Beulah Beach had its start in 1921 as a meeting place for the Bible and Missionary Conference which is still part of the ministry. It currently has a summer camp and retreat center, Beulah Beach Camp and Retreat Center, affiliated with The Christian and Missionary Alliance denomination and a member of the Christian Camp and Conference Association.

== Geography ==
Beulah Beach is located in eastern Erie County in the western part of Vermilion Township. It is about 600 ft (180 m) above sea level.

U.S. Route 6 forms the southern edge of the community, leading northeast 5 miles (8 km) to the city of Vermilion and west 6 miles (10 km) to Huron. Cleveland is 46 miles (74 km) to the east.

== Demographics ==
Historical population
Census	Pop.	Note	%±
2020	75		—
U.S. Decennial Census
