= Huron School District =

Huron School District may refer to:

- Huron School District (Michigan)
- Huron School District (South Dakota)
- Huron City School District
