= Jeff Linkenbach =

American football player (born 1987)

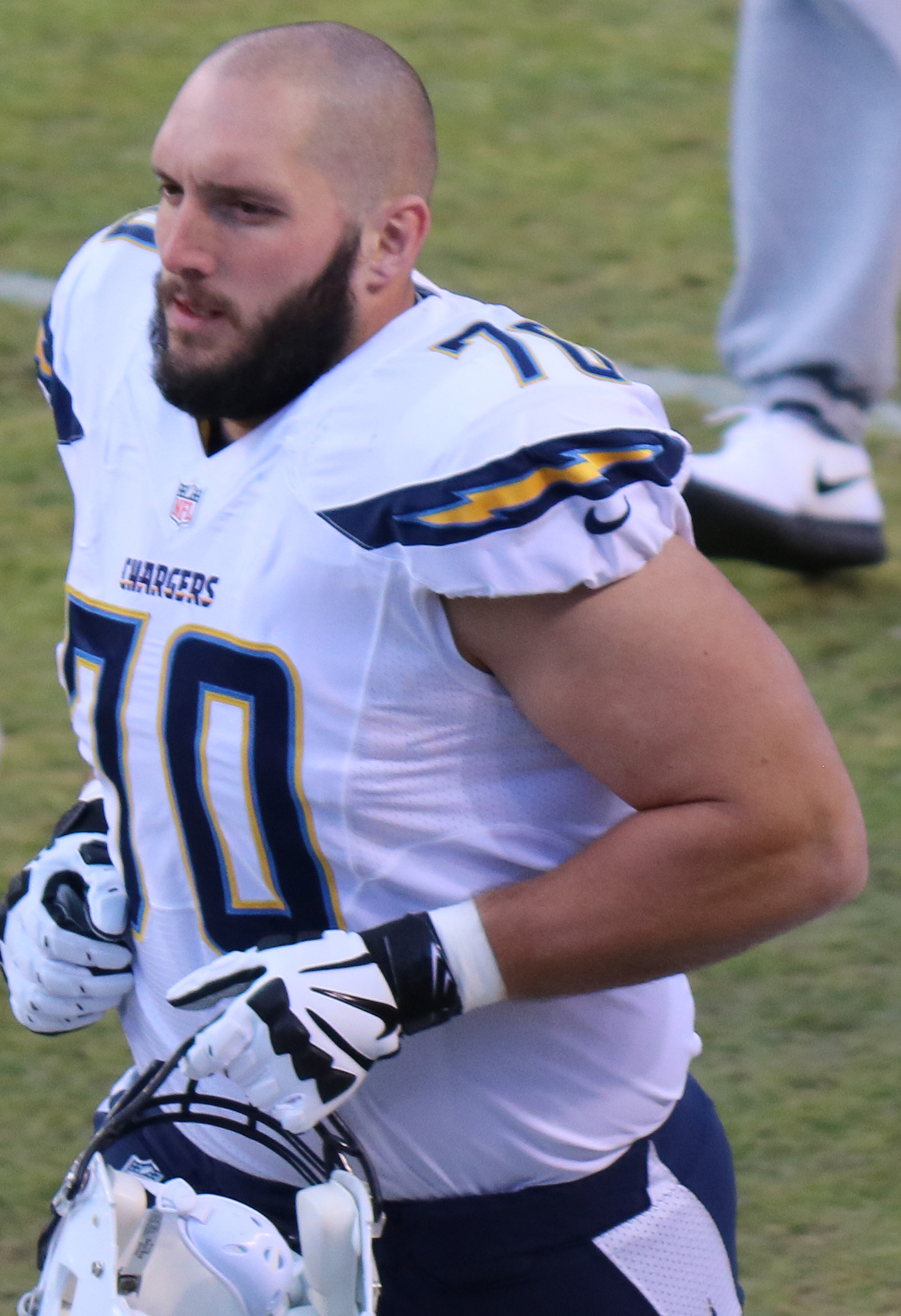
- Linkenbach with the San Diego Chargers in Jan. 2016

No. 72, 74, 70
- Position: Guard

Personal information
- Born: June 9, 1987 (age 39); Sandusky, Ohio, U.S.
- Listed height: 6 ft 6 in (1.98 m)
- Listed weight: 325 lb (147 kg)

Career information
- High school: Castalia (OH) Margaretta
- College: Cincinnati
- NFL draft: 2010: undrafted

Career history
- Indianapolis Colts (2010–2013); Kansas City Chiefs (2014); Miami Dolphins (2015); San Diego Chargers (2015); Jacksonville Jaguars (2016)

Career NFL statistics
- Games played: 86
- Games started: 36
- Stats at Pro Football Reference

Jeffrey Scott Linkenbach II (born June 9, 1987) is an American former professional football player who was a guard in the National Football League (NFL). He was signed by the Indianapolis Colts as an undrafted free agent in 2010. He played college football for the Cincinnati Bearcats and high school football at Margaretta High School in Castalia, OH.

== Professional career ==
=== Indianapolis Colts ===
On September 8, 2010, Linkenbach signed with the Indianapolis Colts as an undrafted free agent. On August 29, 2011, Linkenbach was named the teams starting right tackle. On July 29, 2012, Linkenbach was moved to left guard. On March 11, 2013, the Colts tendered Linkenbach at the original-round level and on March 28 re-signed Linkenbach to a one-year. $1.323 million contract.

=== Kansas City Chiefs ===
On March 12, 2014, Linkenbach signed with the Kansas City Chiefs. The deal was a one-year $900,000 contract.

=== Miami Dolphins ===
After Linkenbach's contract with the Chiefs expired he visited the Miami Dolphins on April 21, 2015. The following day Linkenbach signed a one-year, $795,000 contract with the team. On December 16, 2015, Linkenbach was waived.

=== San Diego Chargers ===
On December 17, 2015, Linkenbach was claimed off waivers by the San Diego Chargers.

=== Jacksonville Jaguars ===
Linkenback was signed by the Jaguars. On August 29, 2016, he was placed on injured reserve.
