= Mitiwanga, Ohio =

- Census-designated place
- Location within Ohio
- Coordinates: 41°22′52″N 82°27′57″W
- Country: United States
- State: Ohio
- County: Erie
- Townships: Berlin, Vermilion

Area
  - Total: 0.42 sq mi (1.10 km^{2})
  - Land: 0.42 sq mi (1.09 km^{2})
  - Water: 0.0039 sq mi (0.01 km^{2})
- Elevation: 600 ft (180 m)

Population (2020)
  - Total: 326
  - Density: 771.4/sq mi (297.83/km^{2})
- Time zone: UTC−5 (Eastern (EST))
  - Summer (DST): UTC−4 (EDT)
- ZIP Code: 44839
- Area code: 419/567
- FIPS code: 39-50974
- GNIS feature ID: 2628935

Mitiwanga is an unincorporated community and census-designated place in Erie County, Ohio, United States. As of the 2020 census, Mitiwanga had a population of 326. It is located within Berlin and Vermilion townships, on the south shore of Lake Erie. U.S. Route 6 passes through the community, leading northeast 6 miles (10 km) to Vermilion and west 5 miles (8 km) to Huron.

== Demographics ==
Historical population
Census	Pop.	Note	%±
2020	326		—
U.S. Decennial Census
