= Ceylon, Ohio =

Unincorporated community in Ohio, U.S.

Coordinates: 41°22′18″N 82°29′38″W

Ceylon is an unincorporated community in Erie County, in the U.S. state of Ohio.

== History ==
A post office called Berlin Station was established in 1858, the name was changed to Ceylon in 1871, and the post office closed in 1904. The community was named after Ceylon (today known as Sri Lanka).
