= Ruggles Beach, Ohio =

Unincorporated community in Ohio, US

Coordinates: 41°22′55″N 82°28′31″W

Ruggles Beach is an unincorporated community in Erie County, in the U.S. state of Ohio.

The community derives its name from Almon Ruggles, a government surveyor.
