= Groton Township, Erie County, Ohio =

Township in Ohio, US

- Township
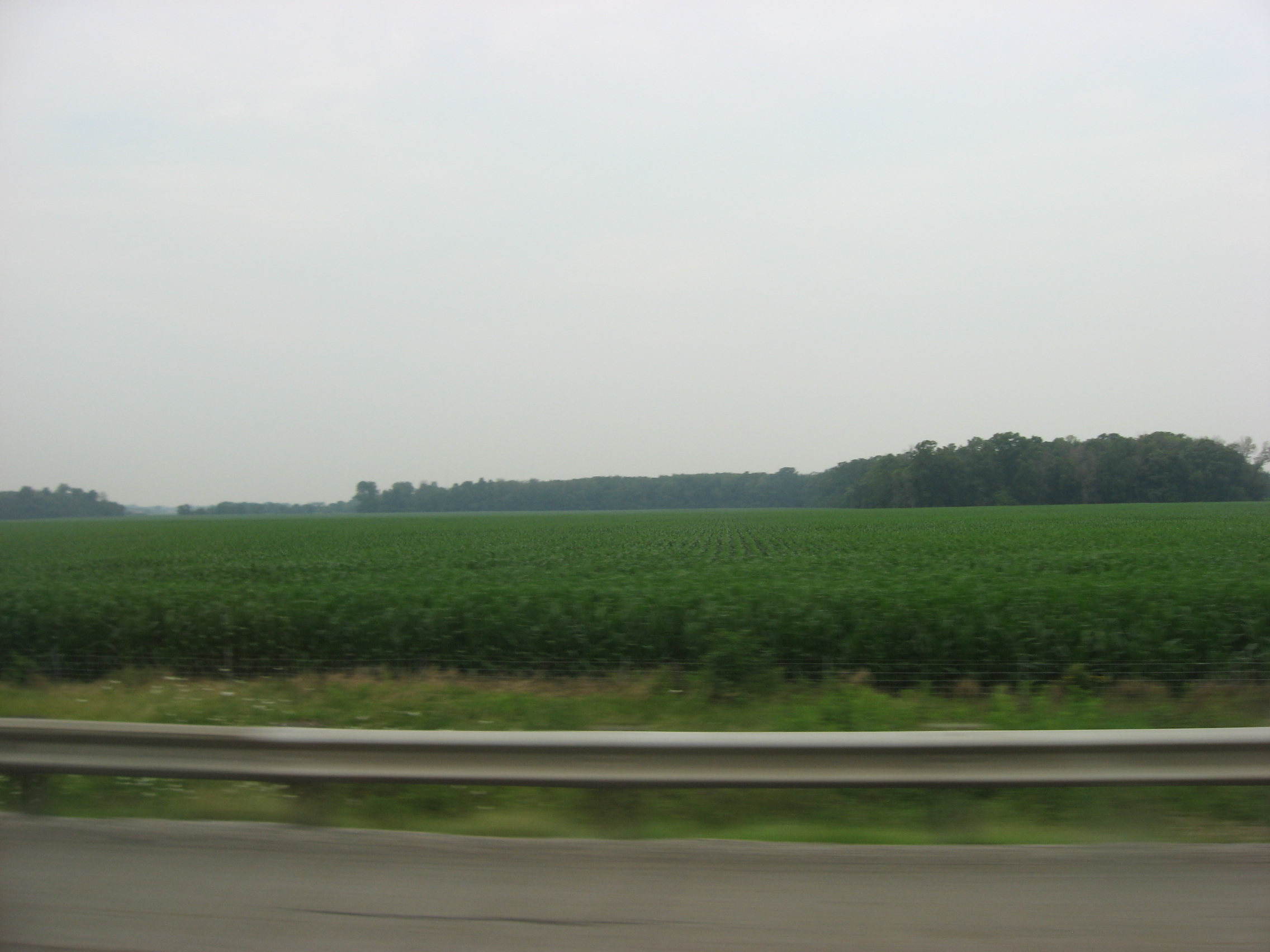
- Fields and woods in northern Groton Township

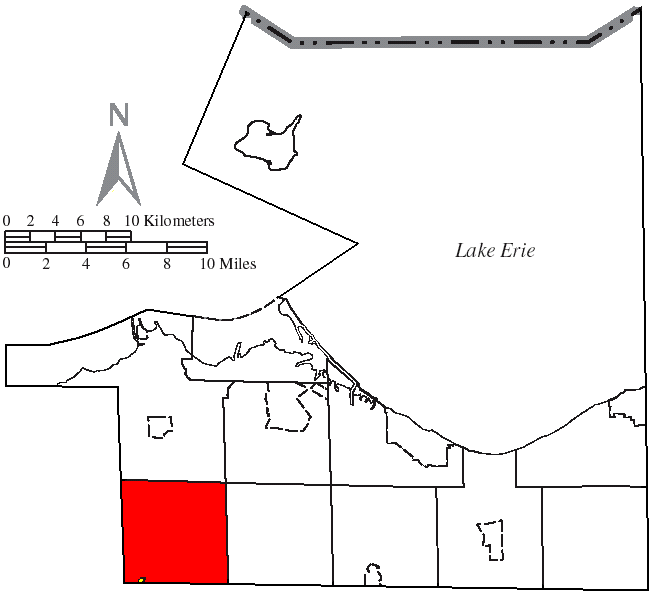
- Location of Groton Township in Erie County
- Coordinates: 41°19′41″N 82°46′47″W
- Country: United States
- State: Ohio
- County: Erie

Area
  - Total: 25.8 sq mi (66.7 km^{2})
  - Land: 25.6 sq mi (66.3 km^{2})
  - Water: 0.15 sq mi (0.4 km^{2})
- Elevation: 720 ft (220 m)

Population (2020)
  - Total: 1,379
  - Density: 53.9/sq mi (20.8/km^{2})
- Time zone: UTC-5 (Eastern (EST))
  - Summer (DST): UTC-4 (EDT)
- FIPS code: 39-32578
- GNIS feature ID: 1086063
- Website: https://www.grotontwp.com/

Groton Township is one of the nine townships of Erie County, Ohio, United States. It is part of the Sandusky, Ohio metropolitan statistical area. As of the 2020 census the population was 1,379.

== Geography ==
Located in the southwestern corner of the county, it borders the following townships:

- Margaretta Township - north
- Perkins Township - northeast corner
- Oxford Township - east
- Ridgefield Township, Huron County - southeast corner
- Lyme Township, Huron County - south
- York Township, Sandusky County - west
- Townsend Township, Sandusky County - northwest

A small corner of the city of Bellevue is located in southwestern Groton Township.

== Name and history ==
It is the only Groton Township statewide.

== Government ==
The township is governed by a three-member board of trustees, who are elected in November of odd-numbered years to a four-year term beginning on the following January 1. Two are elected in the year after the presidential election and one is elected in the year before it. There is also an elected township fiscal officer, who serves a four-year term beginning on April 1 of the year after the election, which is held in November of the year before the presidential election. Vacancies in the fiscal officership or on the board of trustees are filled by the remaining trustees.
