= Charles A. Hawley =

American orthodontist (1861–1929)

- Born: March 13, 1861; Avery, Ohio
- Died: July 22, 1929 (aged 68)
- Education: University of Michigan School of Dentistry
- Known for: first orthodontist in Washington D.C, developed Hawley retainer
- Medical career
- Profession: dentist
- Institutions: University of Michigan School of Dentistry
- Sub-specialties: orthodontics

Charles Augustus Hawley (March 13, 1861 – July 22, 1929) was an American orthodontist who developed the Hawley retainer which is used in the field of orthodontics. He attended Angle School of Orthodontia and graduated in 1905.

== Life ==
He was born in Avery, Ohio in 1861. He attended high school in Columbus, Ohio and then attended Ohio State University for his college degree. He then attended University of Michigan School of Dentistry and graduated in 1893. He then became the Professor of Operative Faculty soon after graduation. He was one of the first people to have used nitrous oxide as an anesthetic for the removal of teeth. He attended Angle School of Orthodontia and graduated in 1905. He moved to Washington, D.C. after and became the first person to specialize in orthodontics in that city.

He was married to Evelyn Frank Hawley, and had two children. He died on July 22, 1929 at the Garfield Hospital in Washington DC, following complications from an operation.

== Career ==
In the field of orthodontics, he is best known for his introduction of a refined type of retention plate called the Hawley Bite Plate. Two of Dr. Hawley's papers Determination of the Normal Arch and Its Application to Orthodontia and An Accurate Method in Orthodontia were read before 4th International Dental Congress and New York Institute of Stomatology.

== Positions held ==
- American Society of Orthodontists, President, 1908
- New York Society of Orthodontists, President, 1929
- Southern Society of Orthodontists, President-Elect, 1929
- District of Columbia Dental Society, President, 1920
- American College of Dentists, Fellow
