= Oxford Township, Erie County, Ohio =

Township in Ohio, US

- Township
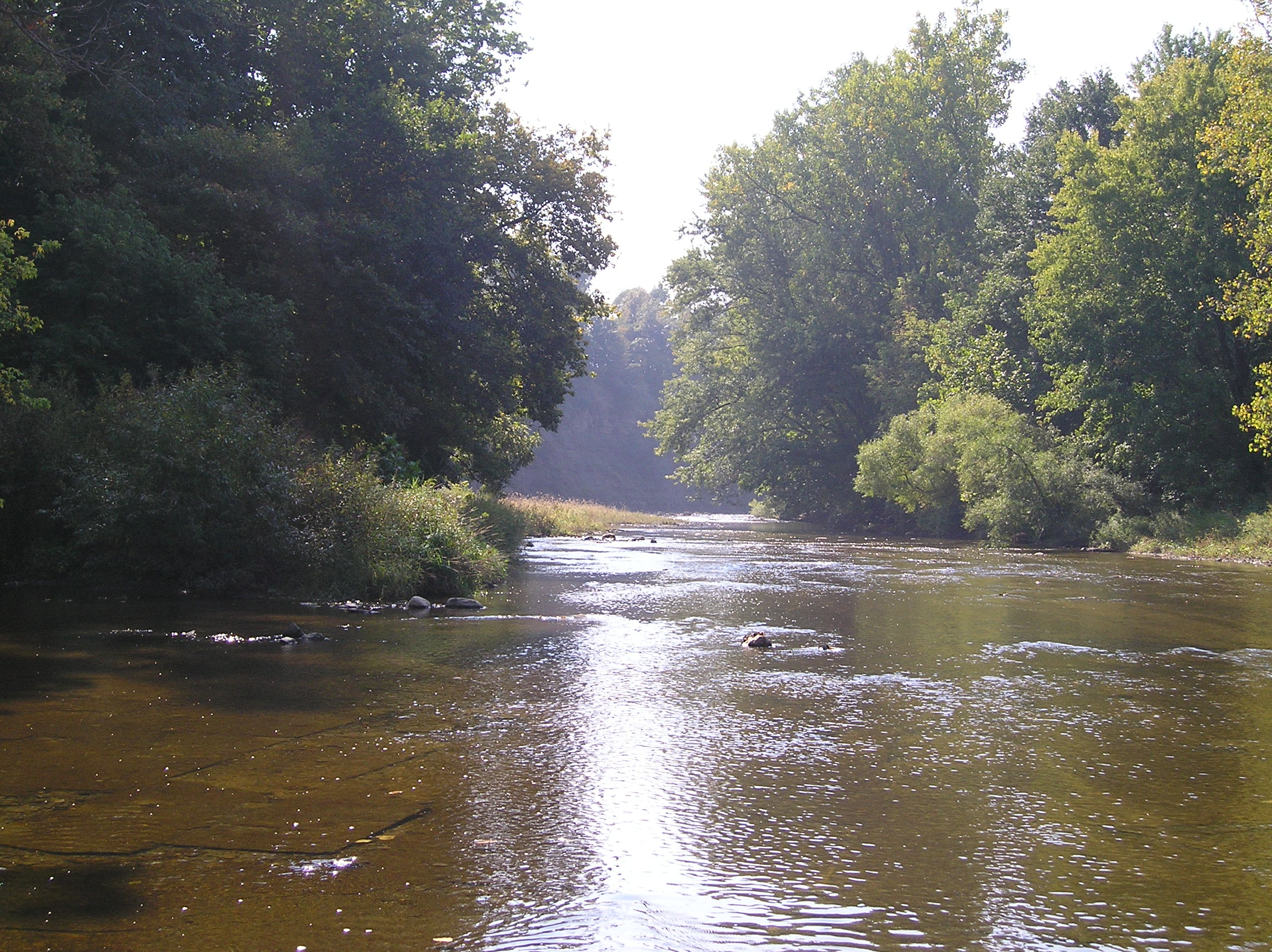
- Along the West Branch of the Huron River in southeastern Oxford Township

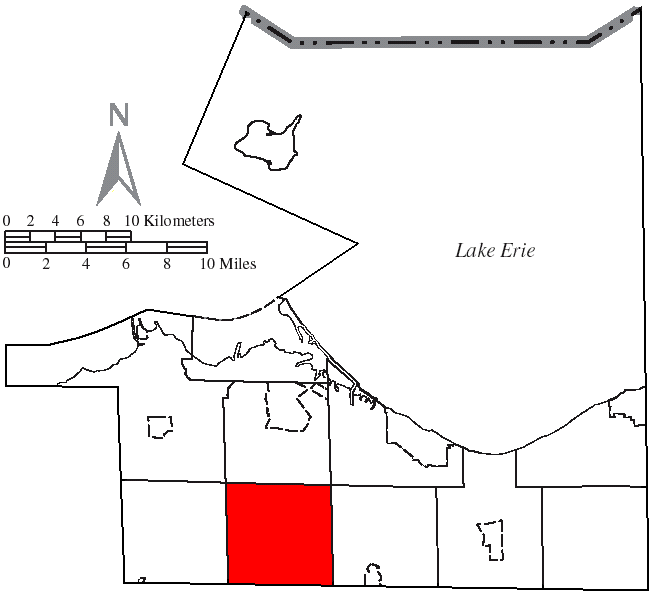
- Location of Oxford Township in Erie County
- Coordinates: 41°19′43″N 82°41′16″W
- Country: United States
- State: Ohio
- County: Erie

Area
  - Total: 26.1 sq mi (67.6 km^{2})
  - Land: 26.0 sq mi (67.4 km^{2})
  - Water: 0.12 sq mi (0.3 km^{2})
- Elevation: 696 ft (212 m)

Population (2020)
  - Total: 1,140
  - Density: 43.8/sq mi (16.9/km^{2})
- Time zone: UTC-5 (Eastern (EST))
  - Summer (DST): UTC-4 (EDT)
- FIPS code: 39-59276
- GNIS feature ID: 1086068
- Website: http://www.oxfordtownshipohio.com/

Oxford Township is one of the nine townships of Erie County, Ohio, United States. It is part of the Sandusky, Ohio micropolitan statistical area and the Cleveland-Akron-Canton Combined Statistical Area. The 2020 census recorded 1,140 residents.

A small section of NASA Glenn Research Center's Plum Brook Station facility is located in Oxford Township. Most notably, the Space Power Facility (SPF)---the world's largest thermal vacuum chamber---is located in the northeastern corner of the township.

== Geography ==
Located in the southwestern part of Erie County, it borders the following townships:

- Perkins Township - north
- Huron Township - northeast
- Milan Township - east
- Norwalk Township, Huron County - southeast
- Ridgefield Township, Huron County - south
- Lyme Township, Huron County - southwest
- Groton Township - west
- Margaretta Township - northwest

No municipalities are located in Oxford Township, although the census-designated place of Bloomingville lies in the northern part of the township.

Oxford Township is part of the Firelands, which in turn is part of the Connecticut Western Reserve.

=== Topography ===
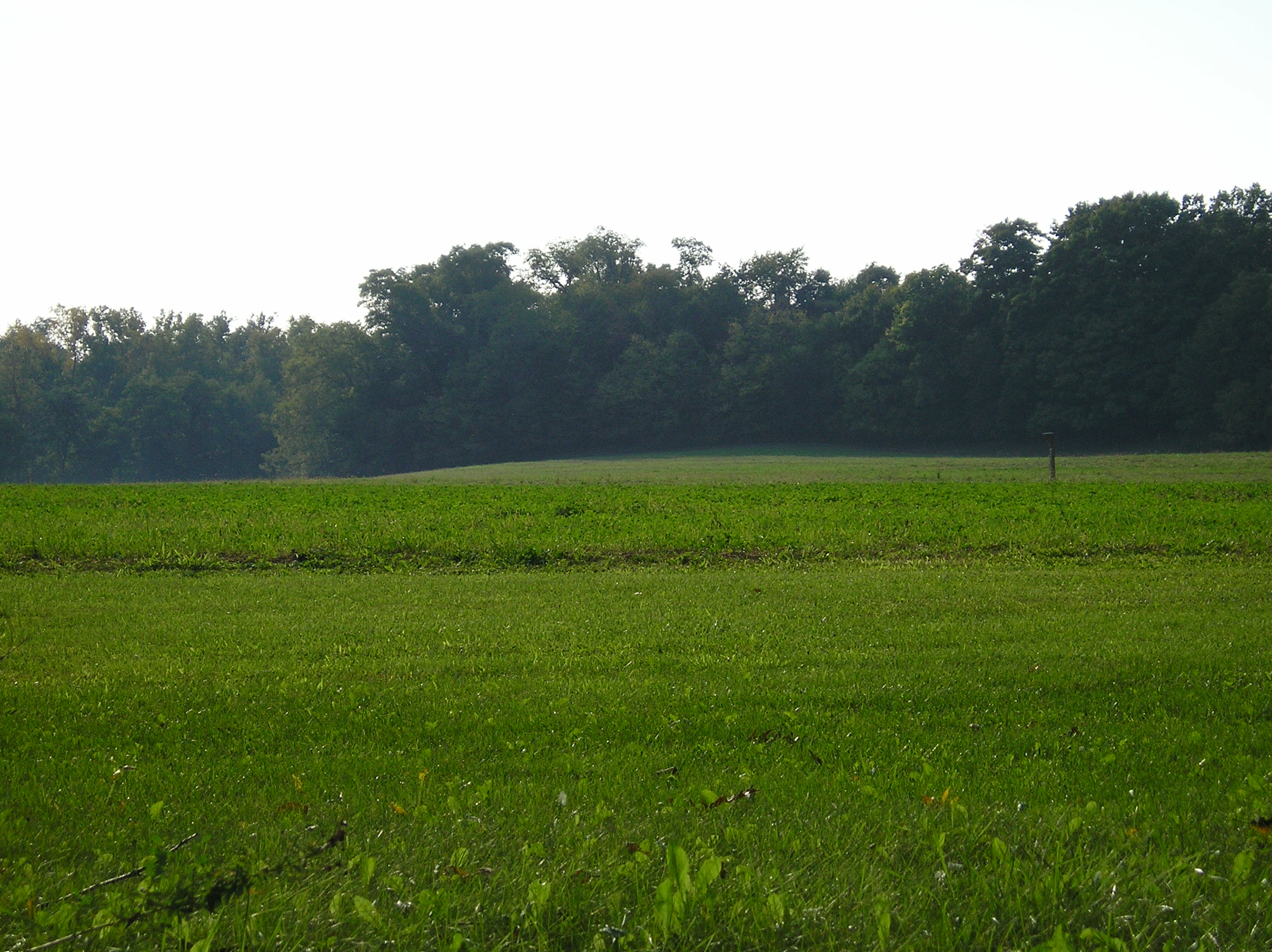
Farm fields and woodlots are a common scene across Oxford Township.

Oxford Township lies within two river watersheds, both flowing into Lake Erie. The majority of the township is within the Huron River watershed while the northwestern area of the township is within the Sandusky Bay watershed.

The majority of the topography of the township includes extremely flat to slightly rolling land; farm fields and small woodlots are in abundance. In the far southeast portion of the township, however, the topography becomes rugged with steep cliffs and dense woods near the west branch of the Huron River. Some of the cliffs are over 100 feet (30 m) high. There are even some small waterfalls near Peru Center Road and Schaffer Road that are approximately 75 feet (23 m) high.

Two state natural areas are located within this township. Erie Sand Barrens State Nature Preserve, a 32-acre (130,000 m^{2}) park in the northwest part of the township, can be accessed from Mason Road and Taylor Road. The 296-acre (1.20 km^{2}) Milan State Wildlife Area in the southeast part of the township can be accessed from State Route 113 and Lovers Lane.

== Name and history ==
Oxford Township is one of only thirty townships located in a unique subregion of the Connecticut Western Reserve, known as the Firelands. Established in 1792, this half-million-acre tract of land (originally known as the Fire Sufferers Land) was given by the Connecticut Legislature to the citizens of towns which were invaded and damaged by British troops during the American Revolutionary War.

It is one of six Oxford Townships statewide.

== Government ==
=== Regional and national government ===
- All of Oxford Township is located within the Ohio 9th District of the US House of Representatives. Marcy Kaptur (D-Toledo) is the elected official for this district, which spans the Lake Erie shoreline from Toledo to the western suburbs of Cleveland.
- All of Oxford Township is located within the Ohio State 2nd Senate District. Mark Wagoner (R-Ottawa Hills) is the elected official for this district (and also serves as the Senate Majority Whip).
- All of Oxford Township is located within the Ohio State 80th House District. Dennis Murray (D-Sandusky) is the representative for this district.

=== Local government ===
The township is governed by a three-member board of trustees, who are elected in November of odd-numbered years to a four-year term beginning on the following January 1. Two are elected in the year after the presidential election and one is elected in the year before it. There is also an elected township fiscal officer, who serves a four-year term beginning on April 1 of the year after the election, which is held in November of the year before the presidential election. Vacancies in the fiscal officership or on the board of trustees are filled by the remaining trustees.

== Public services ==
=== Transportation ===
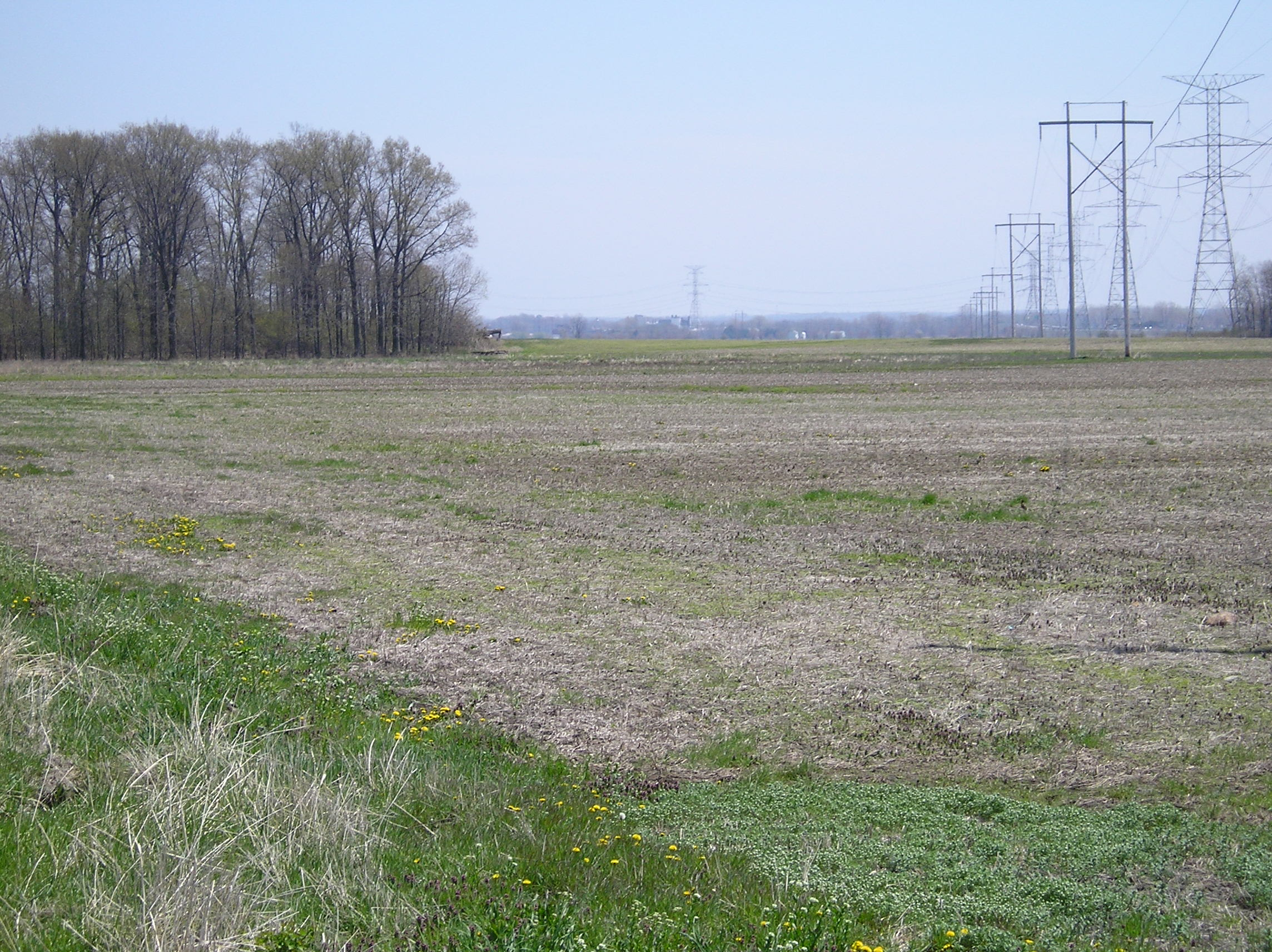
An early winter view from Ransom Road just south of NASA Plum Brook Station in Oxford Township.

The Ohio Turnpike passes through Oxford Township, as does Ohio State Routes 99 and 113. Other important county and township highways include Mason Road, Patten Tract Road, Ransom Road, Strecker Road, and Thomas Road.

=== Communication ===
Addresses in Oxford Township have several different ZIP codes:

- 44846 (Milan), in the east
- 44847 (Monroeville), in the southwest
- 44857 (Norwalk), in the far southeast
- 44870 (Sandusky), in the north

Telephone numbers in Oxford Townships have one of two area codes, either 419 or 567.

=== Education ===
Children from Oxford Townships attend one of three different public school districts:

- The Berlin-Milan Local School District, in the east
- The Monroeville Local School District, in the south
- The Perkins Local School District, in the northwest

Parochial schools are located in the nearby towns of Monroeville, Norwalk, and Sandusky.

=== Safety ===
Residents are protected by the Erie County Sheriff's Department, North Central EMS, and one of two volunteer fire departments: the Groton Township fire department, for residents in the western part of the township; and the Milan Township fire department, for residents in the eastern part of the township.
