= Erie County Courthouse (Ohio) =

Local government building in the United States

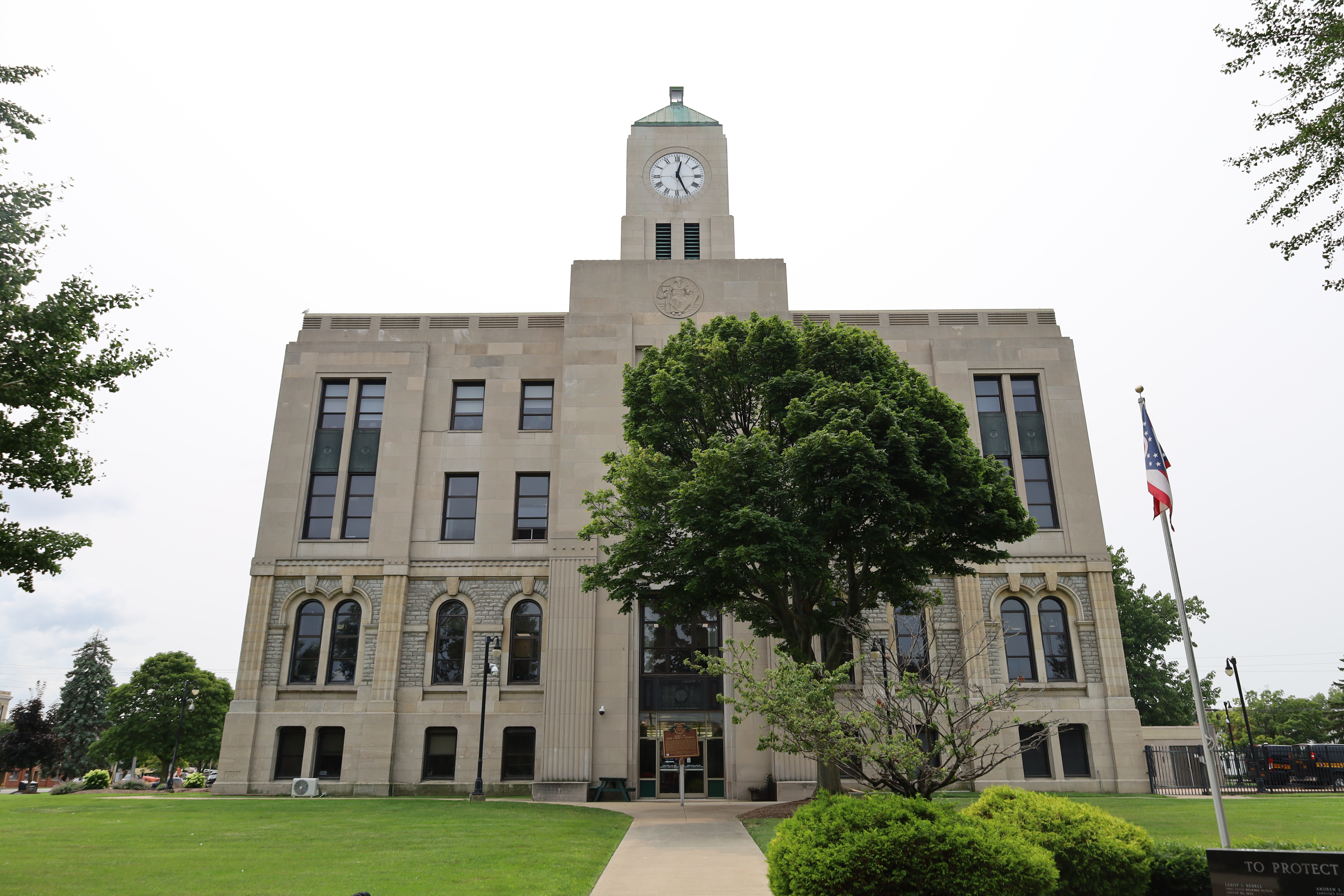
- Erie County Courthouse in Sandusky, Ohio in 2023
- Interactive map of the Erie County Courthouse area

General information
- Architectural style: Art Deco
- Location: Sandusky, Ohio, United States
- Coordinates: 41°27′13.88″N 82°42′40.95″W
- Construction started: 1936
- Completed: 1939
- Client: Erie County Commissioners

Design and construction
- Architects: Myer & Holmes

The Erie County Courthouse is located at 323 Columbus Avenue in Sandusky, Ohio. The current courthouse has served the county since 1939.

== History ==
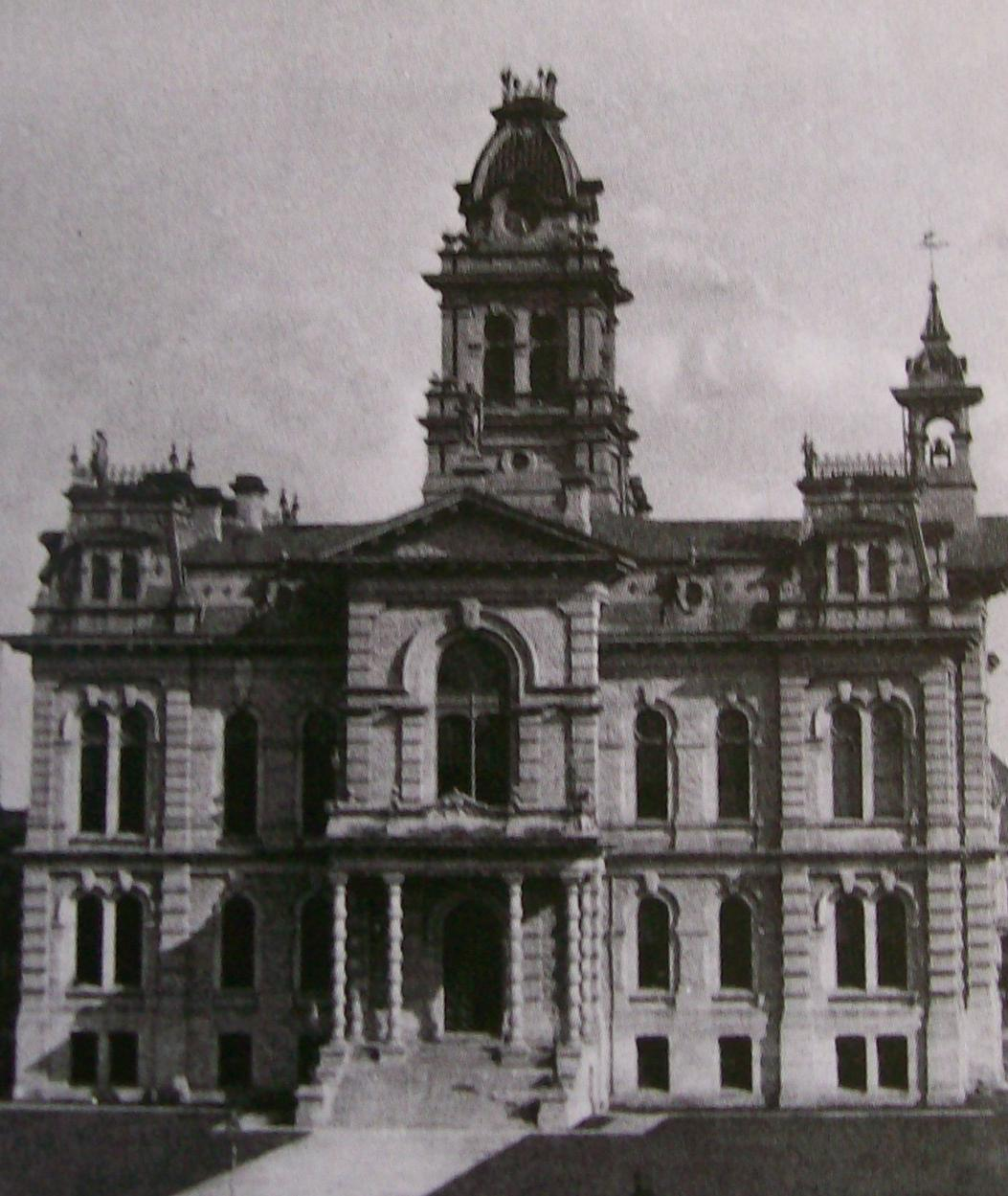
The courthouse's original appearance in 1878

Erie County was established in 1838 from the northern half of Huron County. At that time, and until the courthouse was completed in 1874, the courts met in various locations around town. A contest was held for the design of a courthouse, with the winning design to be built as soon as possible.

The courthouse of 1874 was designed in the Second Empire style. The facade rose three floors up with the roofline containing dormer windows. The corners of the structure as well as the center project from the rectangular footprint. The corners were capped with a mansard roof styled tower, and the center was capped by a pediment. The center of the building rose into a tall tower and is capped with a widow's walk.

The courthouse was extensively remodeled from 1936 to 1939 as part of the WPA and no longer resembles the old building. This remodel caused controversy throughout the county as factions for and against the remodel sprouted, but the remodel went ahead as scheduled.

== Exterior ==
The style used during the remodeling was the Art Deco style popular during that era. The smooth stone facade no longer projects at the corners, but still contains a central projection. The roof is flat and is still topped by a central tower, but much of the original decoration was stripped away. The tower is capped by a triangular cap stone.

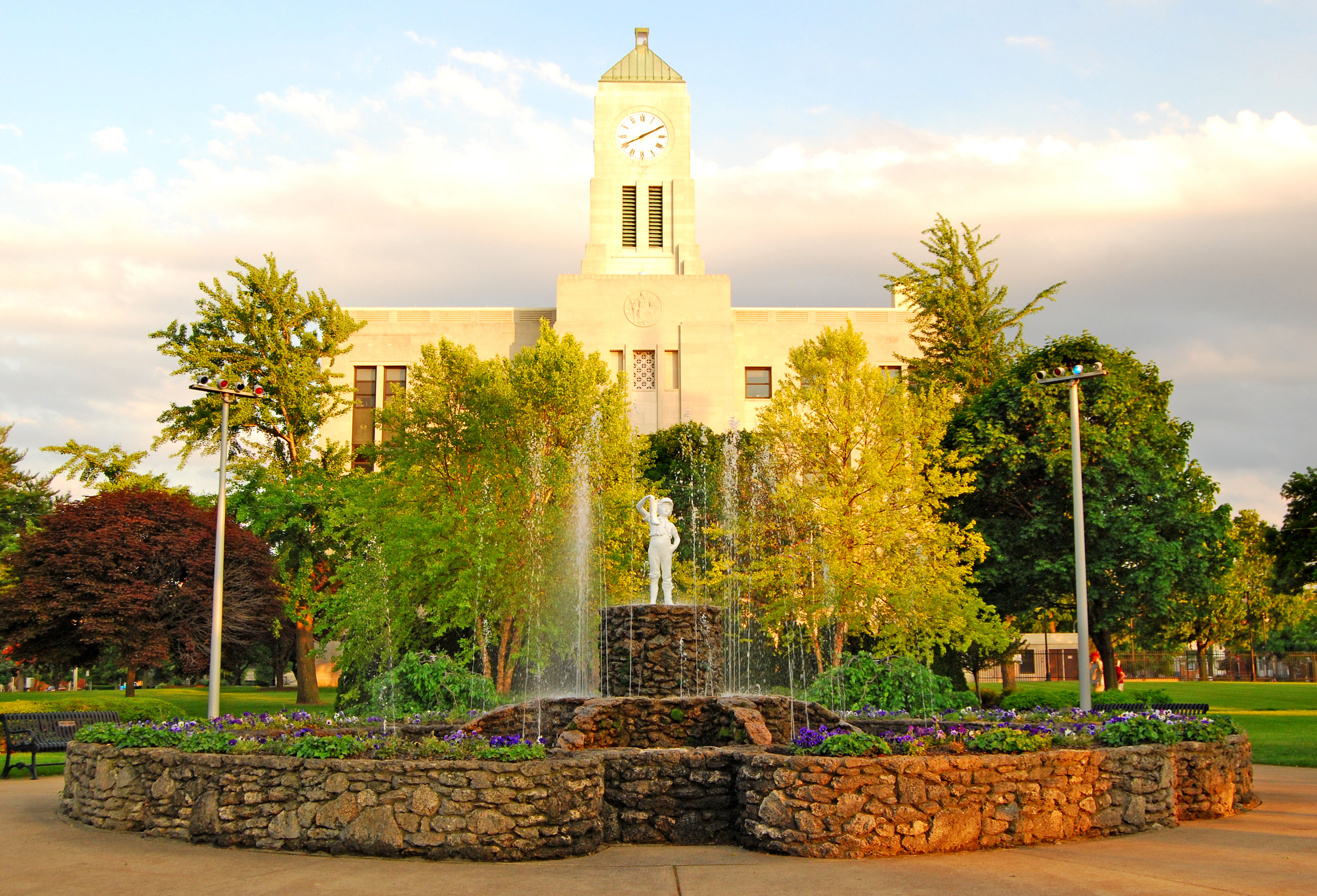
The courthouse and its fountain in 2008
