= Huron City School District =

School district in Ohio

Coordinates: 41°23′59″N 82°33′54″W

Huron City School District is a public school district serving students in the city of Huron, Ohio, United States. The school district enrolls 1,569 students as of the 2012–2013 academic year.

== Schools ==
=== Elementary school ===
- Woodlands Elementary School (Grades Kindergarten through 5th)

=== Middle school ===
- McCormick Middle School (Grades 6th, 7th and 8th)

=== High school ===
- Huron High School (Grades 9th through 12th)

*The Huron Board of Education voted unanimously to close Shawnee Elementary at the end of the 2022-2023 School Year. Shawnee Elementary's last day of operation was Friday May 26, 2023. The building was put up for auction.
