= Whites Landing, Ohio =

- Census-designated place
- Location within Ohio
- Coordinates: 41°25′51″N 82°53′45″W
- Country: United States
- State: Ohio
- Counties: Erie, Sandusky
- Townships: Margaretta, Townsend

Area
  - Total: 0.29 sq mi (0.76 km^{2})
  - Land: 0.29 sq mi (0.76 km^{2})
  - Water: 0 sq mi (0.00 km^{2})
- Elevation: 577 ft (176 m)

Population (2020)
  - Total: 350
  - Density: 1,194.7/sq mi (461.29/km^{2})
- Time zone: UTC-5 (Eastern (EST))
  - Summer (DST): UTC-4 (EDT)
- Area code: 419 / 567
- FIPS code: 39-84882
- GNIS feature ID: 2584370

Whites Landing is an unincorporated community and census-designated place in Erie and Sandusky counties, Ohio, United States. As of the 2020 census it had a population of 350. It is located within Margaretta and Townsend townships.

== Geography ==
Whites Landing is located on the border between Erie and Sandusky counties, on the south shore of Sandusky Bay, an arm of Lake Erie. It is 11 miles (18 km) west of the city of Sandusky and 14 miles (23 km) northeast of Fremont.

== Demographics ==
Historical population
Census	Pop.	Note	%±
2020	350		—
U.S. Decennial Census
