= Bay View, Ohio =

- Village
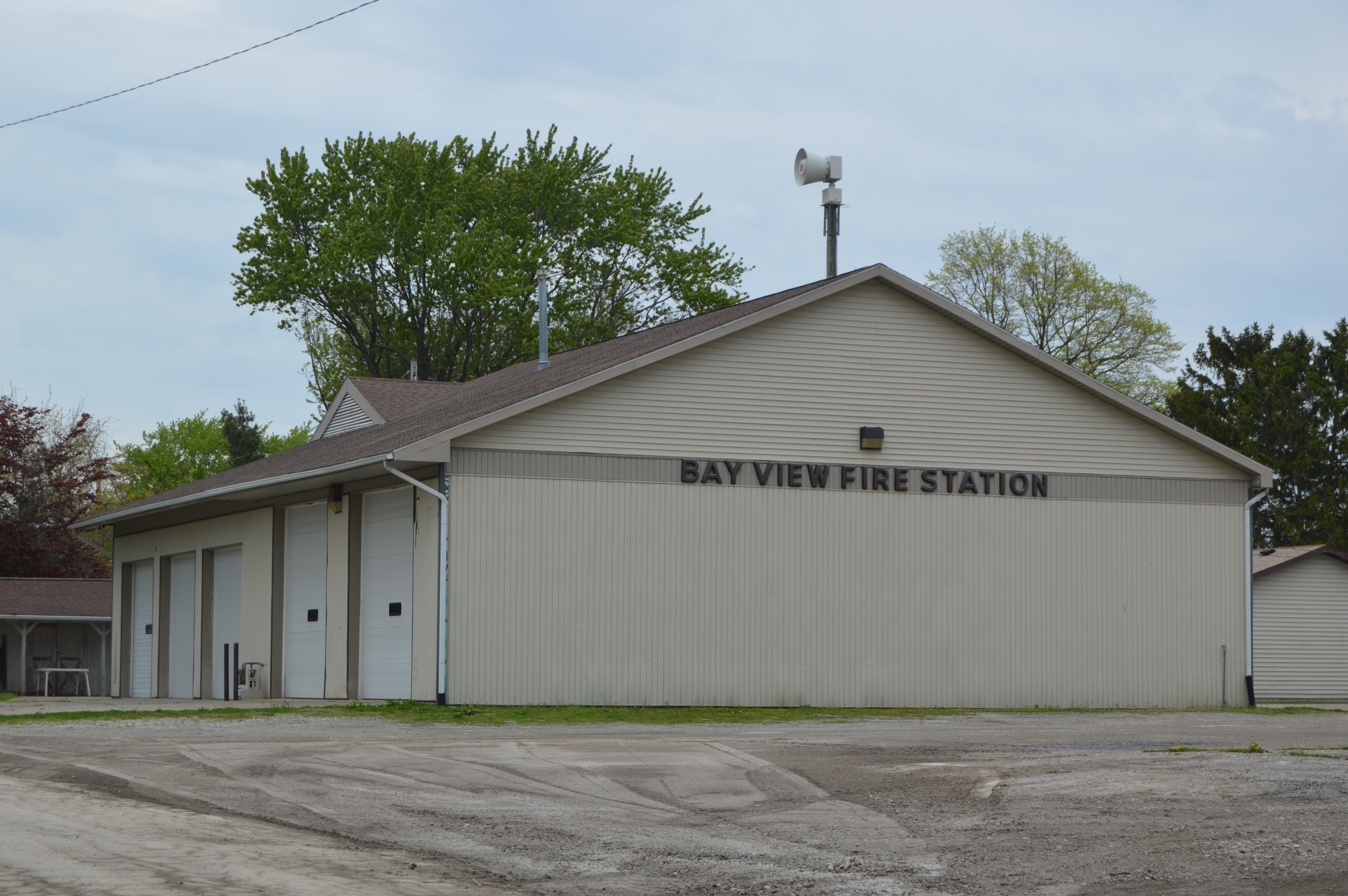
- Fire department

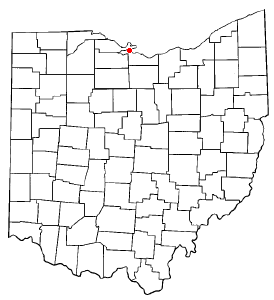
- Location of Bay View, Ohio

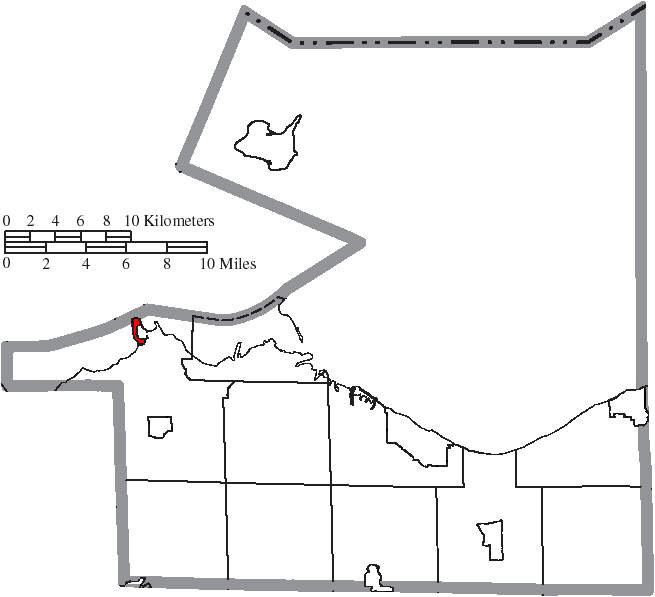
- Location of Bay View in Erie County
- Coordinates: 41°28′06″N 82°49′30″W
- Country: United States
- State: Ohio
- County: Erie
- Township: Margaretta

Government
  - Mayor: Larry D. Gwinner

Area
  - Total: 0.28 sq mi (0.72 km^{2})
  - Land: 0.28 sq mi (0.72 km^{2})
  - Water: 0 sq mi (0.00 km^{2})
- Elevation: 577 ft (176 m)

Population (2020)
  - Total: 608
  - Estimate (2023): 594
  - Density: 2,202.1/sq mi (850.23/km^{2})
- Time zone: UTC-5 (Eastern (EST))
  - Summer (DST): UTC-4 (EDT)
- ZIP code: 44870
- Area code: 419 / 567
- FIPS code: 39-04402
- GNIS feature ID: 2398051
- Website: https://villageofbayview.com/

Bay View is a village in Erie County, Ohio, United States. The population was 608 at the 2020 census. It is part of the Metropolitan Statistical Area.

The village consists primarily of summer homes (many converted to year-round use) and a few small businesses. The community lies on the shores of Sandusky Bay.

== History ==
Bay View was incorporated in 1951.

== Geography ==
According to the United States Census Bureau, the village has a total area of 0.28 square miles (0.73 km^{2}), all land.

== Demographics ==
Historical population
Census	Pop.	Note	%±
1960	802		—
1970	798		−0.5%
1980	804		0.8%
1990	739		−8.1%
2000	692		−6.4%
2010	632		−8.7%
2020	608		−3.8%
2023 (est.)	594	▼	−2.3%
U.S. Decennial Census

=== 2010 census ===
As of the census of 2010, there were 632 people, 279 households, and 172 families residing in the village. The population density was 2,257.1 inhabitants per square mile (871.5/km^{2}). There were 342 housing units at an average density of 1,221.4 per square mile (471.6/km^{2}). The racial makeup of the village was 96.8% White, 0.3% African American, 0.9% Native American, 0.8% Asian, and 1.1% from two or more races. Hispanic or Latino of any race were 0.5% of the population.

There were 279 households, of which 22.9% had children under the age of 18 living with them, 46.6% were married couples living together, 9.0% had a female householder with no husband present, 6.1% had a male householder with no wife present, and 38.4% were non-families. 30.8% of all households were made up of individuals, and 9% had someone living alone who was 65 years of age or older. The average household size was 2.27 and the average family size was 2.83.

The median age in the village was 47.7 years. 19.5% of residents were under the age of 18; 6.5% were between the ages of 18 and 24; 19.6% were from 25 to 44; 34.9% were from 45 to 64; and 19.3% were 65 years of age or older. The gender makeup of the village was 49.7% male and 50.3% female.

=== 2000 census ===
As of the census of 2000, there were 692 people, 292 households, and 195 families residing in the village. The population density was 2,372.6 inhabitants per square mile (916.1/km^{2}). There were 351 housing units at an average density of 1,203.4 per square mile (464.6/km^{2}). The racial makeup of the village was 98.27% White, 0.29% Asian, 0.72% from other races, and 0.72% from two or more races. Hispanic or Latino of any race were 1.73% of the population.

There were 292 households, out of which 25.3% had children under the age of 18 living with them, 56.5% were married couples living together, 7.9% had a female householder with no husband present, and 32.9% were non-families. 27.7% of all households were made up of individuals, and 9.2% had someone living alone who was 65 years of age or older. The average household size was 2.37 and the average family size was 2.87.

In the village, the population was spread out, with 23.4% under the age of 18, 4.9% from 18 to 24, 28.8% from 25 to 44, 29.3% from 45 to 64, and 13.6% who were 65 years of age or older. The median age was 42 years. For every 100 females there were 99.4 males. For every 100 females age 18 and over, there were 101.5 males.

The median income for a household in the village was $41,167, and the median income for a family was $48,977. Males had a median income of $39,722 versus $22,721 for females. The per capita income for the village was $19,596. About 3.6% of families and 4.0% of the population were below the poverty line, including 6.5% of those under age 18 and 1.9% of those age 65 or over.
