= Vickery, Ohio =

- CDP
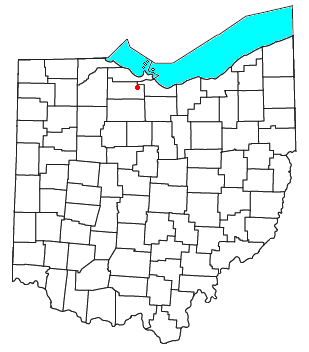
- Location of Vickery, Ohio
- Coordinates: 41°22′30″N 82°56′31″W
- Country: United States
- State: Ohio
- County: Sandusky
- Township: Townsend
- Elevation: 694 ft (212 m)

Population (2020)
  - Total: 101
- Time zone: UTC-5 (Eastern (EST))
  - Summer (DST): UTC-4 (EDT)
- ZIP code: 43464
- Area codes: 419 and 567
- GNIS feature ID: 2584369

Vickery is an unincorporated community and a census-designated place in western Townsend Township, Sandusky County, Ohio, United States. It has a post office with the ZIP code 43464 and a volunteer fire department called Townsend Township FD. The population of the CDP was 101 at the 2020 census.

== History ==
Vickery was platted in 1881 by Robert Vickery, and named for him. A post office has been in operation at Vickery since 1881.
