= Erie County, Ohio =

County in Ohio, US

- County
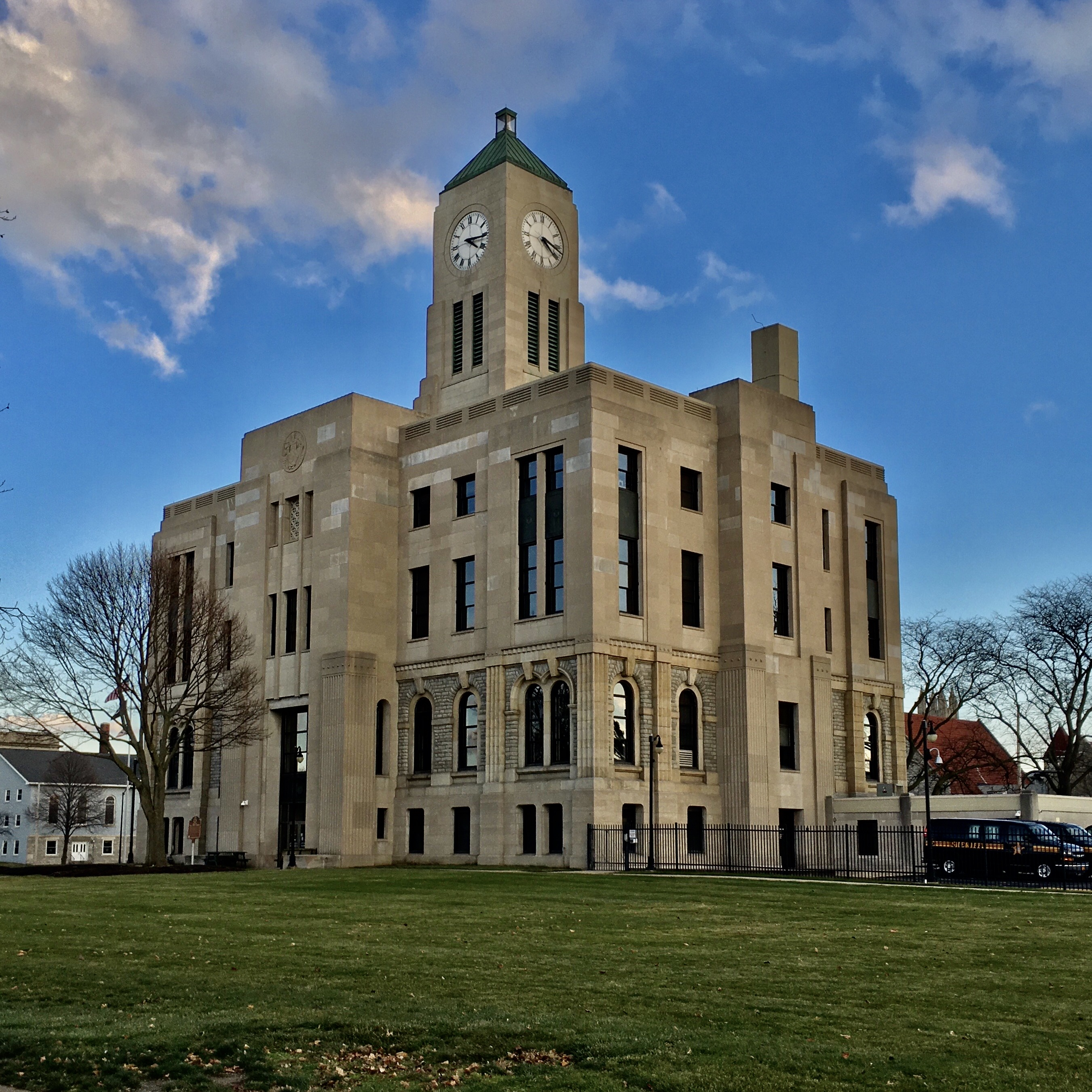
- Erie County Courthouse

- Flag Seal

- Location within the U.S. state of Ohio
- Coordinates: 41°31′N 82°37′W
- Country: United States
- State: Ohio
- Founded: March 16, 1838
- Named for: Erie tribe
- Seat: Sandusky
- Largest city: Sandusky

Area
  - Total: 626 sq mi (1,620 km^{2})
  - Land: 252 sq mi (650 km^{2})
  - Water: 374 sq mi (970 km^{2}) 60%

Population (2020)
  - Total: 75,622
  - Estimate (2025): 73,296 ▼
  - Density: 120/sq mi (46/km^{2})
- Time zone: UTC−5 (Eastern)
  - Summer (DST): UTC−4 (EDT)
- Congressional district: 9th
- Website: eriecounty.oh.gov

Erie County is a county in the northern portion of the U.S. state of Ohio. As of the 2020 census, the population was 75,622. Its county seat and largest city is Sandusky. The county is named for the Erie tribe, whose name was their word for "wildcat". It was formed in 1838 from the northern third of Huron County and a portion of Sandusky County.

Erie County is included in the Sandusky, OH Metropolitan Statistical Area, which is also included in the Cleveland–Akron–Canton, OH Combined Statistical Area.

== History ==
Erie County was created in 1838 from a portion of Huron County. A few subsequent changes to Erie County's boundaries occurred shortly after its initial formation.

== Geography ==
According to the U.S. Census Bureau, the county has a total area of 626 square miles (1,620 km^{2}), of which 252 square miles (650 km^{2}) is land and 374 square miles (970 km^{2}) (60%) is water. It is the second-smallest county in Ohio by land area after Lake County. The county is bordered on the north by Lake Erie; the opposite shore is made up of two counties in Ontario, Canada.

It is drained by the Huron and Vermilion rivers. Near the Huron River are several ancient earthwork mounds and enclosures constructed by early indigenous peoples. Sandusky has extensive quarries of valuable limestone. The surface is generally level, and the soil alluvial and exceedingly fertile.

=== Adjacent counties and municipalities ===
- Essex County, Ontario (north, across Lake Erie)
- Chatham-Kent municipality, Ontario (north, across Lake Erie)
- Lorain County (east)
- Huron County (south)
- Sandusky County (west)
- Ottawa County (northwest)

=== Major highways ===
- I-80 / I-90 (Ohio Turnpike)
- US 6
- US 250
- SR 2
- SR 4
- SR 13
- SR 60
- SR 61
- SR 99
- SR 101
- SR 113
- SR 269

== Demographics ==
Historical population
Census	Pop.	Note	%±
1840	12,599		—
1850	18,568		47.4%
1860	24,474		31.8%
1870	28,188		15.2%
1880	32,640		15.8%
1890	35,462		8.6%
1900	37,650		6.2%
1910	38,327		1.8%
1920	39,789		3.8%
1930	42,133		5.9%
1940	43,201		2.5%
1950	52,565		21.7%
1960	68,000		29.4%
1970	75,909		11.6%
1980	79,655		4.9%
1990	76,779		−3.6%
2000	79,551		3.6%
2010	77,079		−3.1%
2020	75,622		−1.9%
2025 (est.)	73,296	▼	−3.1%
U.S. Decennial Census; 1790–1960 1900–1990; 1990–2000 2020

=== 2020 census ===
As of the 2020 census, the county had a population of 75,622. The median age was 46.1 years, 20.0% of residents were under the age of 18, and 23.6% of residents were 65 years of age or older. For every 100 females there were 96.2 males, and for every 100 females age 18 and over there were 94.5 males age 18 and over.

The racial makeup of the county was 82.1% White, 9.0% Black or African American, 0.3% American Indian and Alaska Native, 0.6% Asian, <0.1% Native Hawaiian and Pacific Islander, 1.1% from some other race, and 6.9% from two or more races. Hispanic or Latino residents of any race comprised 4.1% of the population.

71.8% of residents lived in urban areas, while 28.2% lived in rural areas.

There were 32,360 households in the county, of which 24.8% had children under the age of 18 living in them. Of all households, 44.3% were married-couple households, 19.6% were households with a male householder and no spouse or partner present, and 28.5% were households with a female householder and no spouse or partner present. About 31.8% of all households were made up of individuals and 14.8% had someone living alone who was 65 years of age or older.

There were 38,262 housing units, of which 15.4% were vacant. Among occupied housing units, 68.5% were owner-occupied and 31.5% were renter-occupied. The homeowner vacancy rate was 1.6% and the rental vacancy rate was 8.5%.

=== Racial and ethnic composition ===
Erie County, Ohio – Racial and ethnic composition Note: the US Census treats Hispanic/Latino as an ethnic category. This table excludes Latinos from the racial categories and assigns them to a separate category. Hispanics/Latinos may be of any race.
Race / ethnicity (NH = Non-Hispanic)	Pop 1980	Pop 1990	Pop 2000	Pop 2010	Pop 2020	% 1980	% 1990	% 2000	% 2010	% 2020
White alone (NH)	72,474	68,861	69,510	65,463	61,061	90.98%	89.69%	87.38%	84.93%	80.75%
Black or African American alone (NH)	5,844	6,264	6,820	6,534	6,655	7.34%	8.16%	8.57%	8.48%	8.80%
Native American or Alaska Native alone (NH)	63	140	133	188	121	0.08%	0.18%	0.17%	0.24%	0.16%
Asian alone (NH)	153	256	297	456	474	0.19%	0.33%	0.37%	0.59%	0.63%
Native Hawaiian or Pacific Islander alone (NH)	x (Note: Included in the Asian category in the 1980 Census)	x (Note: Included in the Asian category in the 1990 Census)	2	6	10	x	x	0.00%	0.01%	0.01%
Other race alone (NH)	94	78	59	66	232	0.12%	0.10%	0.07%	0.09%	0.31%
Mixed race or Multiracial (NH)	x (Note: Not an option in the 1980 Census)	x (Note: Not an option in the 1990 Census)	1,066	1,762	3,939	x	x	1.34%	2.29%	5.21%
Hispanic or Latino (any race)	1,027	1,180	1,664	2,604	3,130	1.29%	1.54%	2.09%	3.38%	4.14%
Total	79,655	76,779	79,551	77,079	75,622	100.00%	100.00%	100.00%	100.00%	100.00%

=== 2010 census ===
As of the 2010 United States census, there were 77,079 people, 31,860 households, and 21,011 families residing in the county. The population density was 306.4 inhabitants per square mile (118.3/km^{2}). There were 37,845 housing units at an average density of 150.4 units per square mile (58.1 units/km^{2}). The racial makeup of the county was 87.0% white, 8.6% black or African American, 0.6% Asian, 0.3% American Indian, 0.7% from other races, and 2.8% from two or more races. Those of Hispanic or Latino origin made up 3.4% of the population. In terms of ancestry, 38.8% were German, 15.2% were Irish, 11.7% were English, 8.5% were Italian, and 4.6% were American.

Of the 31,860 households, 29.1% had children under the age of 18 living with them, 48.5% were married couples living together, 12.9% had a female householder with no husband present, 34.1% were non-families, and 28.6% of all households were made up of individuals. The average household size was 2.37 and the average family size was 2.89. The median age was 43.4 years.

The median income for a household in the county was $46,593 and the median income for a family was $61,247. Males had a median income of $46,211 versus $32,621 for females. The per capita income for the county was $25,290. About 8.5% of families and 12.5% of the population were below the poverty line, including 17.1% of those under age 18 and 8.5% of those age 65 or over.

=== 2000 census ===
As of the census of 2000, there were 79,551 people, 31,727 households, and 21,764 families residing in the county. The population density was 312 inhabitants per square mile (120/km^{2}). There were 35,909 housing units at an average density of 141 units per square mile (54/km^{2}). The racial makeup of the county was 88.64% White, 8.64% Black or African American, 0.21% Native American, 0.37% Asian, 0.01% Pacific Islander, 0.53% from other races, and 1.60% from two or more races. 2.09% of the population were Hispanic or Latino of any race. 35.7% were of German, 9.2% Irish, 8.2% English, 8.1% Italian, and 7.8% American ancestry according to Census 2000.

There were 31,727 households, out of which 30.40% had children under the age of 18 living with them, 53.70% were married couples living together, 11.20% had a female householder with no husband present, and 31.40% were non-families. 27.00% of all households were made up of individuals, and 10.80% had someone living alone who was 65 years of age or older. The average household size was 2.45 and the average family size was 2.97.

In the county, the population was spread out, with 24.70% under the age of 18, 7.20% from 18 to 24, 27.00% from 25 to 44, 25.50% from 45 to 64, and 15.60% who were 65 years of age or older. The median age was 40 years. For every 100 females there were 95.00 males. For every 100 females age 18 and over, there were 92.40 males.

The median income for a household in the county was $42,746, and the median income for a family was $51,756. Males had a median income of $39,249 versus $23,697 for females. The per capita income for the county was $21,530. About 6.00% of families and 8.30% of the population were below the poverty line, including 11.60% of those under age 18 and 6.80% of those age 65 or over.

== Government and politics ==
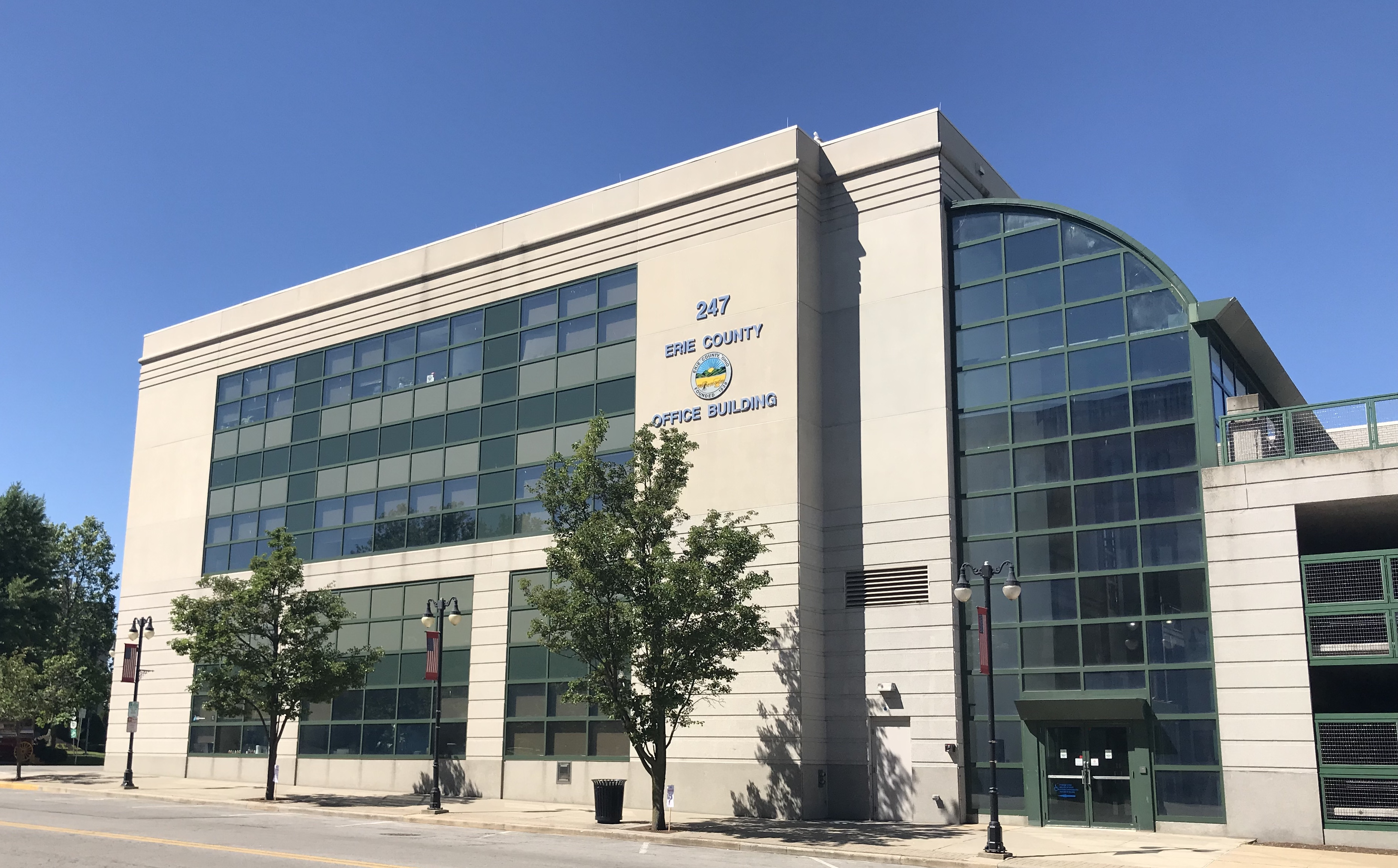
Erie County Office Building

Patrick Shenigo is the Chairman of the Erie County Commission, the highest elected position in the county.

From 1992 to 2012, Erie County consistently voted Democratic. In 2016, however, it swung from a 12.3% margin for Barack Obama to a 9.5% margin for Donald Trump, tracking with Trump's unexpectedly strong showing in the Rust Belt. Trump further increased his margin of victory to 11.5% in 2020 and improved again to 14.1% in 2024. In 2024, Trump won the highest percentage of the vote in the county since 1984.

United States presidential election results for Erie County, Ohio
Year	Republican		Democratic		Third party(ies)	
Year	No.	%	No.	%	No.	%
1856	2,258	60.86%	1,377	37.12%	75	2.02%
1860	2,886	63.57%	1,538	33.88%	116	2.56%
1864	3,033	62.41%	1,827	37.59%	0	0.00%
1868	3,130	62.43%	1,884	37.57%	0	0.00%
1872	2,905	55.75%	2,287	43.89%	19	0.36%
1876	3,158	49.40%	3,112	48.68%	123	1.92%
1880	3,661	51.51%	3,305	46.50%	141	1.98%
1884	3,507	45.51%	4,044	52.48%	155	2.01%
1888	3,721	45.49%	4,322	52.84%	136	1.66%
1892	3,979	47.28%	4,195	49.85%	242	2.88%
1896	5,442	53.18%	4,641	45.35%	150	1.47%
1900	5,353	51.95%	4,837	46.94%	115	1.12%
1904	5,764	58.67%	3,648	37.13%	413	4.20%
1908	5,366	50.14%	4,983	46.56%	353	3.30%
1912	2,695	30.22%	3,504	39.29%	2,720	30.50%
1916	4,170	43.12%	5,152	53.27%	349	3.61%
1920	8,755	62.36%	4,831	34.41%	453	3.23%
1924	7,689	54.34%	2,968	20.97%	3,494	24.69%
1928	10,380	57.68%	7,570	42.06%	46	0.26%
1932	7,666	40.68%	10,765	57.13%	412	2.19%
1936	6,869	36.69%	10,376	55.43%	1,475	7.88%
1940	11,267	54.90%	9,254	45.10%	0	0.00%
1944	10,663	57.90%	7,753	42.10%	0	0.00%
1948	9,568	52.28%	8,644	47.23%	90	0.49%
1952	14,245	65.36%	7,549	34.64%	0	0.00%
1956	14,771	70.18%	6,276	29.82%	0	0.00%
1960	15,092	57.94%	10,954	42.06%	0	0.00%
1964	9,981	38.46%	15,968	61.54%	0	0.00%
1968	13,023	48.50%	11,388	42.41%	2,438	9.08%
1972	16,714	58.46%	10,889	38.09%	988	3.46%
1976	14,742	50.01%	13,843	46.96%	893	3.03%
1980	15,628	51.29%	12,343	40.51%	2,499	8.20%
1984	19,174	57.83%	13,508	40.74%	472	1.42%
1988	16,670	51.77%	15,097	46.89%	431	1.34%
1992	12,459	34.77%	14,531	40.56%	8,838	24.67%
1996	12,204	36.49%	16,730	50.02%	4,515	13.50%
2000	16,105	45.99%	17,732	50.64%	1,178	3.36%
2004	18,597	46.39%	21,421	53.44%	67	0.17%
2008	17,432	42.13%	23,148	55.95%	795	1.92%
2012	16,952	42.92%	21,793	55.17%	755	1.91%
2016	19,648	51.89%	16,057	42.41%	2,157	5.70%
2020	22,160	54.83%	17,493	43.28%	763	1.89%
2024	22,493	56.32%	16,871	42.24%	573	1.43%

United States Senate election results for Erie County, Ohio1
Year	Republican		Democratic		Third party(ies)	
Year	No.	%	No.	%	No.	%
2024	19,654	50.00%	18,117	46.09%	1,536	3.91%

=== County officials ===
Office	Name	Party
Commissioner	Steve Shoffner	Republican
Commissioner	Matt Old	Republican
Commissioner	Patrick J. Shenigo	Republican
Prosecutor	Kevin J. Baxter	Democrat
Sheriff	Paul A. Sigsworth	Democrat
Clerk of Courts	Craig A. Hecht	Republican
Recorder	Nicholas Smith	Republican
Treasurer	Caleb Stidham	Republican
Engineer	Eric Dodrill	Republican
Coroner	Brian Baxter	Republican
Auditor	Richard H. Jeffrey	Republican
Common Pleas Court Judge	Tygh M. Tone	Democrat
Common Pleas Court Judge	Roger E. Binette	Republican
Common Pleas Court Judge	Beverly K. McGookey	Democrat
Juvenile Court Judge	Robert C. DeLamatre	Republican

=== Courthouse ===
Erie County's courthouse at 323 Columbus Avenue in Sandusky was built in 1872 by Cleveland architects Myer and Holmes in a richly ornamented Second Empire style. Most of the façade was remodeled beginning in 1936 in Art Deco in a WPA project led locally by architect Henry Millott. Some of the original façade remains visible around the bottom row of windows.

== Education ==
All or part of eleven school districts serve Erie County and its residents:

- Bellevue City School District: includes parts of Bellevue and Groton Township.
- Edison Local School District: includes parts of Berlin Heights and Milan, and Berlin, Florence, Huron, Milan, Oxford, Perkins, and Vermilion Townships.
- Firelands Local School District: includes parts of Florence Township.
- Huron City School District: includes parts of Huron and Berlin, Huron, and Milan Townships.
- Kelleys Island Local School District: includes all of Kelleys Island.
- Margaretta Local School District: includes parts of Bay View and Castalia, and Groton and Margaretta Townships.
- Monroeville Local School District: includes parts of Oxford Township.
- Perkins Local School District: includes parts of Groton, Huron, Margaretta, Milan, Oxford, and Perkins Townships.
- Sandusky Central Catholic Schools: includes Sandusky's three catholic Parishes (St. Mary's, Sts. Peter & Paul, and Holy Angels).
- St. Peter's School: a private catholic elementary school in Huron
- Sandusky City School District: includes all of Sandusky.
- Vermilion Local School District: includes parts of Vermilion and Florence and Vermilion Townships.
- Western Reserve Local School District: including parts of Florence Township.

== Communities ==
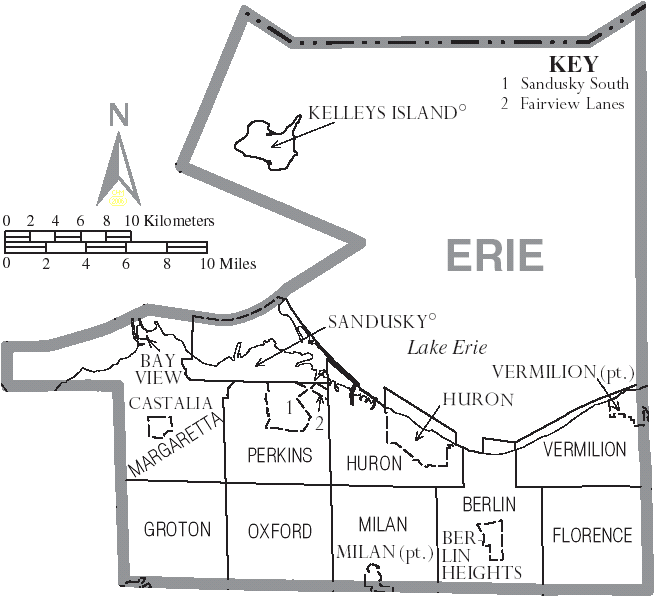
Map of Erie County, Ohio With Municipal and Township Labels

=== Cities ===
- Bellevue (part)
- Huron
- Sandusky (county seat)
- Vermilion (part)

=== Villages ===
- Bay View
- Berlin Heights
- Castalia
- Kelleys Island
- Milan (part)

=== Townships ===
- Berlin
- Florence
- Groton
- Huron
- Margaretta
- Milan
- Oxford
- Perkins
- Vermilion

=== Census-designated places ===
- Beulah Beach
- Birmingham
- Bloomingville
- Crystal Rock
- Mitiwanga
- Whites Landing

=== Unincorporated communities ===
- Avery
- Axtel
- Birmingham
- Bloomingville
- Bogart
- Ceylon
- Fairview Lanes
- Florence
- Ruggles Beach
- Sandusky South

== Places of interest ==
- Blue Hole
- Cedar Point
- Plum Brook Station
- Thomas Alva Edison Birthplace

== See also ==
- National Register of Historic Places listings in Erie County, Ohio
