= Margaretta Township, Erie County, Ohio =

Township in Ohio, US

- Township
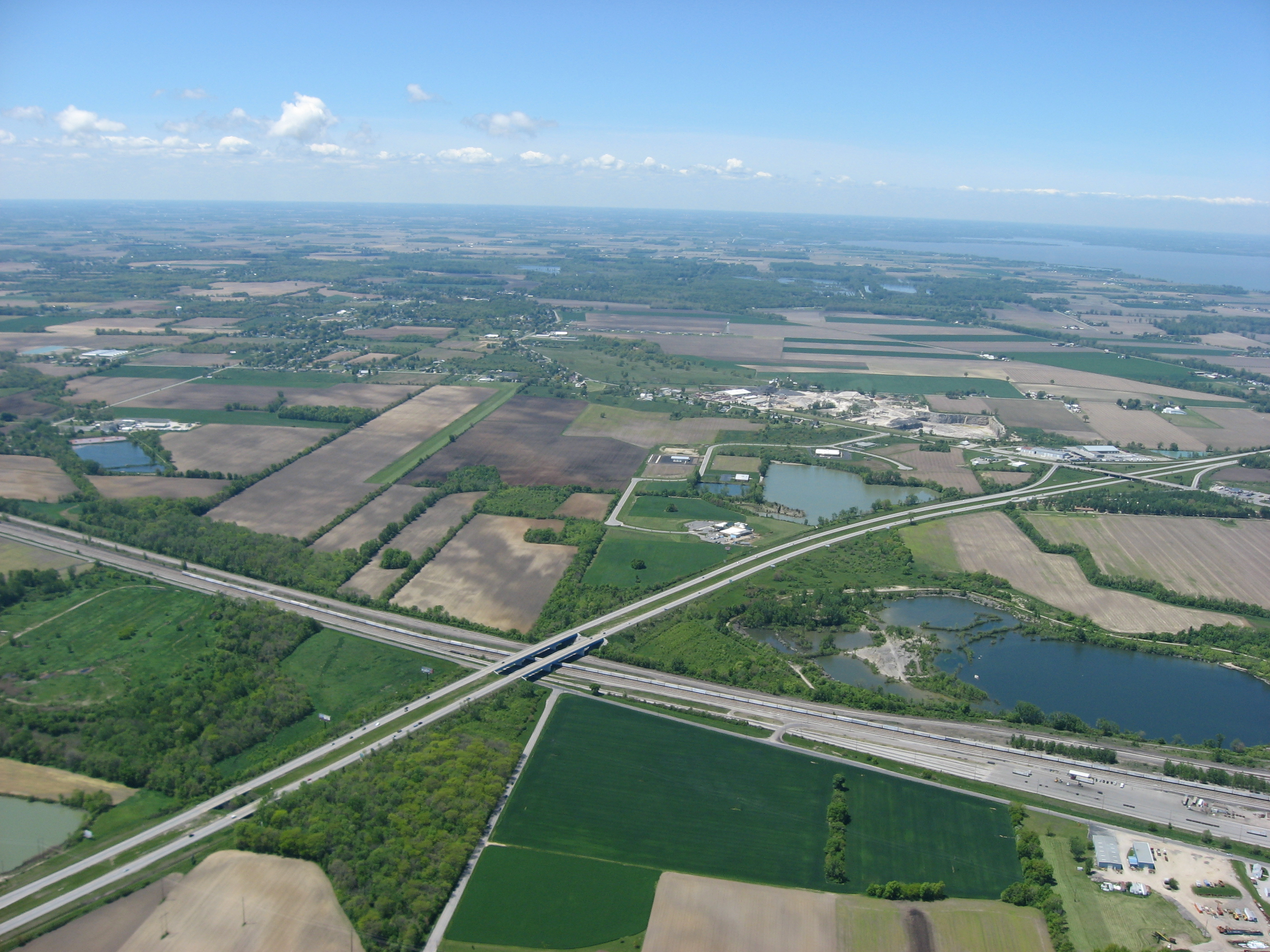
- Countryside at the eastern edge of Margaretta Township

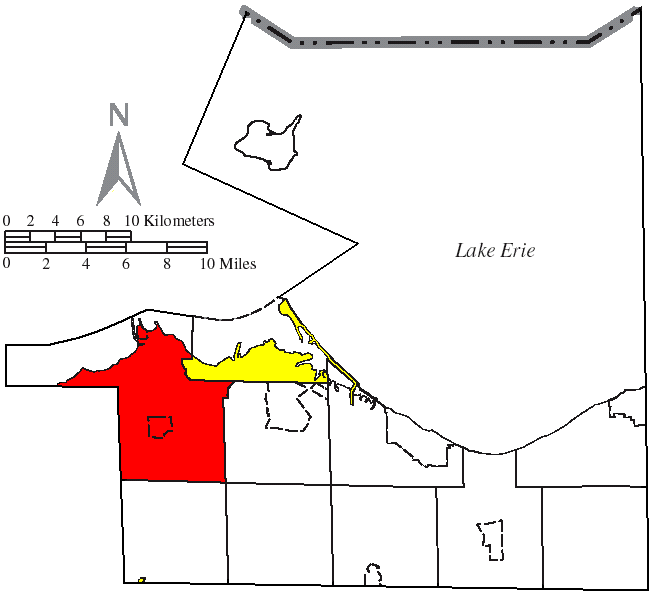
- Location of Margaretta Township (red) in Erie County, adjacent to the city of Sandusky (yellow)
- Coordinates: 41°25′30″N 82°48′20″W
- Country: United States
- State: Ohio
- County: Erie

Area
  - Total: 50.2 sq mi (129.9 km^{2})
  - Land: 32.6 sq mi (84.5 km^{2})
  - Water: 17.5 sq mi (45.4 km^{2})
- Elevation: 620 ft (189 m)

Population (2020)
  - Total: 5,640
  - Density: 173/sq mi (66.7/km^{2})
- Time zone: UTC-5 (Eastern (EST))
  - Summer (DST): UTC-4 (EDT)
- FIPS code: 39-47572
- GNIS feature ID: 1086066
- Website: margarettatwp.org

Margaretta Township is one of the nine townships of Erie County, Ohio, United States. It is part of the Sandusky, Ohio metropolitan statistical area. As of the 2020 census the population was 5,640.

== Geography ==
Located in the northwestern corner of the county, it borders the following townships and city:

- Portage Township, Ottawa County - north across Sandusky Bay, west of Danbury Township
- Danbury Township, Ottawa County - north across Sandusky Bay, east of Portage Township
- Sandusky - northeast
- Perkins Township - east
- Oxford Township - southeast corner
- Groton Township - south
- Townsend Township, Sandusky County - southwest
- Riley Township, Sandusky County - west across Sandusky Bay
- Bay Township, Ottawa County - northwest across Sandusky Bay

The farthest north and west township in Erie County, Margaretta Township is the only county township with any border on Ottawa County.

Two villages are located in Margaretta Township: Bay View on the Sandusky Bay shoreline, and Castalia in the center of the township. The census-designated places of Crystal Rock and Whites Landing lie in the township's northwest and far west.

A section in the northwest is the only part of Erie County to lie outside the Western Reserve.

== Name and history ==
Margaretta Township was named for several family members named Margaret, namely the mother, sister, and nieces of Major Frederick Falley, a founder of the township.

It is the only Margaretta Township statewide.

== Economy ==
Ford Motor Company operates a manufacturing facility in Margaretta, under its Automotive Components Holdings banner. The plant formerly operated under the Visteon name, but changed in 2005.

== Government ==
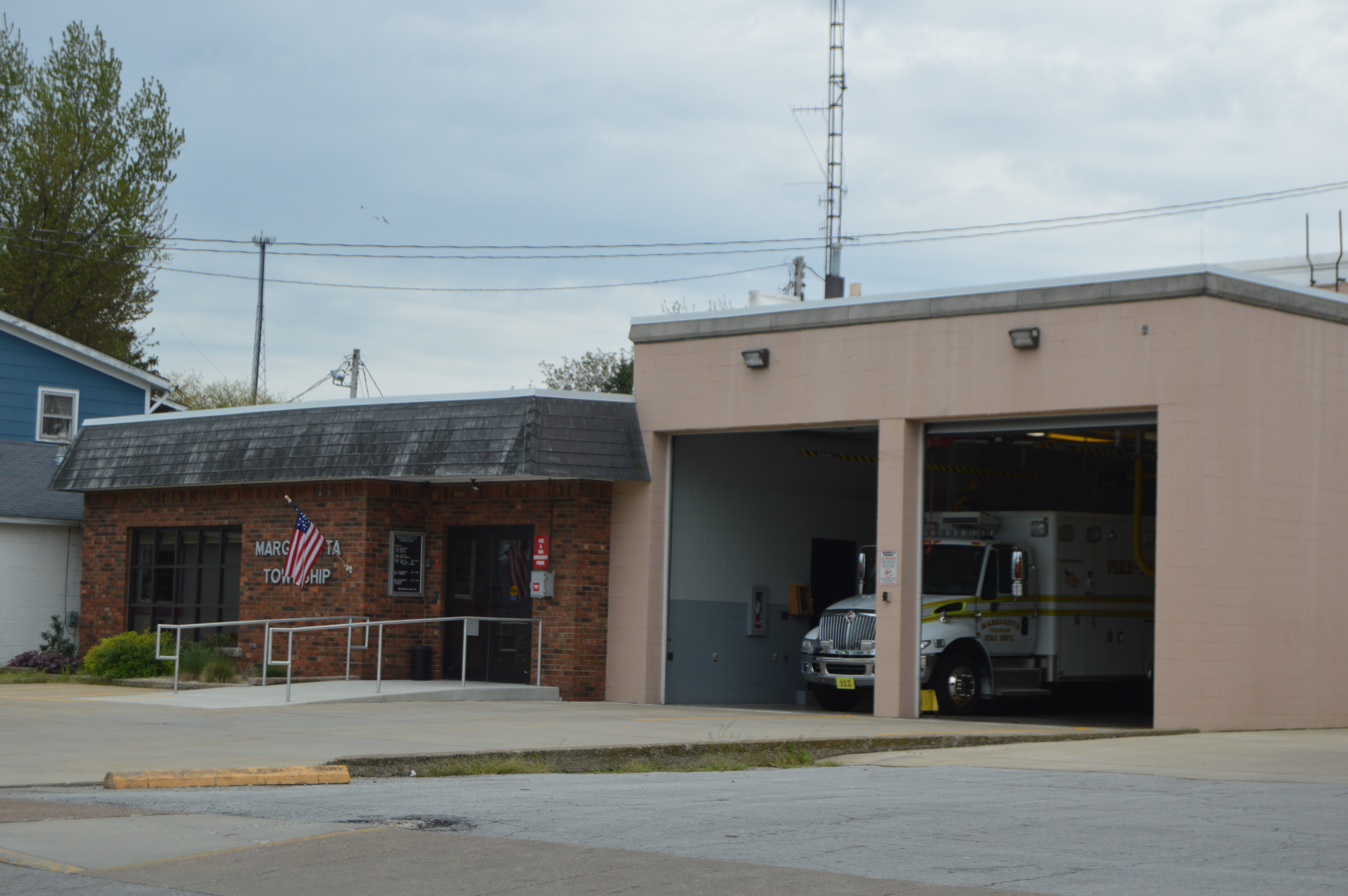
Township offices in Castalia

The township is governed by a three-member board of trustees, who are elected in November of odd-numbered years to a four-year term beginning on the following January 1. Two are elected in the year after the presidential election and one is elected in the year before it. There is also an elected township fiscal officer, who serves a four-year term beginning on April 1 of the year after the election, which is held in November of the year before the presidential election. Vacancies in the fiscal officership or on the board of trustees are filled by the remaining trustees.
