= Crystal Rock, Ohio =

- Census-designated place
- Location within Ohio
- Coordinates: 41°26′52″N 82°50′31″W
- Country: United States
- State: Ohio
- County: Erie
- Township: Margaretta

Area
  - Total: 0.11 sq mi (0.28 km^{2})
  - Land: 0.11 sq mi (0.28 km^{2})
  - Water: 0 sq mi (0.00 km^{2})
- Elevation: 577 ft (176 m)

Population (2020)
  - Total: 138
  - Density: 1,296.4/sq mi (500.55/km^{2})
- Time zone: UTC-5 (Eastern (EST))
  - Summer (DST): UTC-4 (EDT)
- Area code: 419 / 567
- FIPS code: 39-19615
- GNIS feature ID: 2628878

Crystal Rock is an unincorporated community and census-designated place in Erie County, Ohio, United States. As of the 2020 census it had a population of 138. It is located within Margaretta Township.

== Geography ==
Crystal Rock is located in western Erie County, in the northwestern part of Margaretta Township, on the south shore of Sandusky Bay, an arm of Lake Erie. It is 8 miles (13 km) west of the city of Sandusky.

== Demographics ==
Historical population
Census	Pop.	Note	%±
2020	138		—
U.S. Decennial Census
