= Vermilion Township, Erie County, Ohio =

Township in Ohio, US

- Township
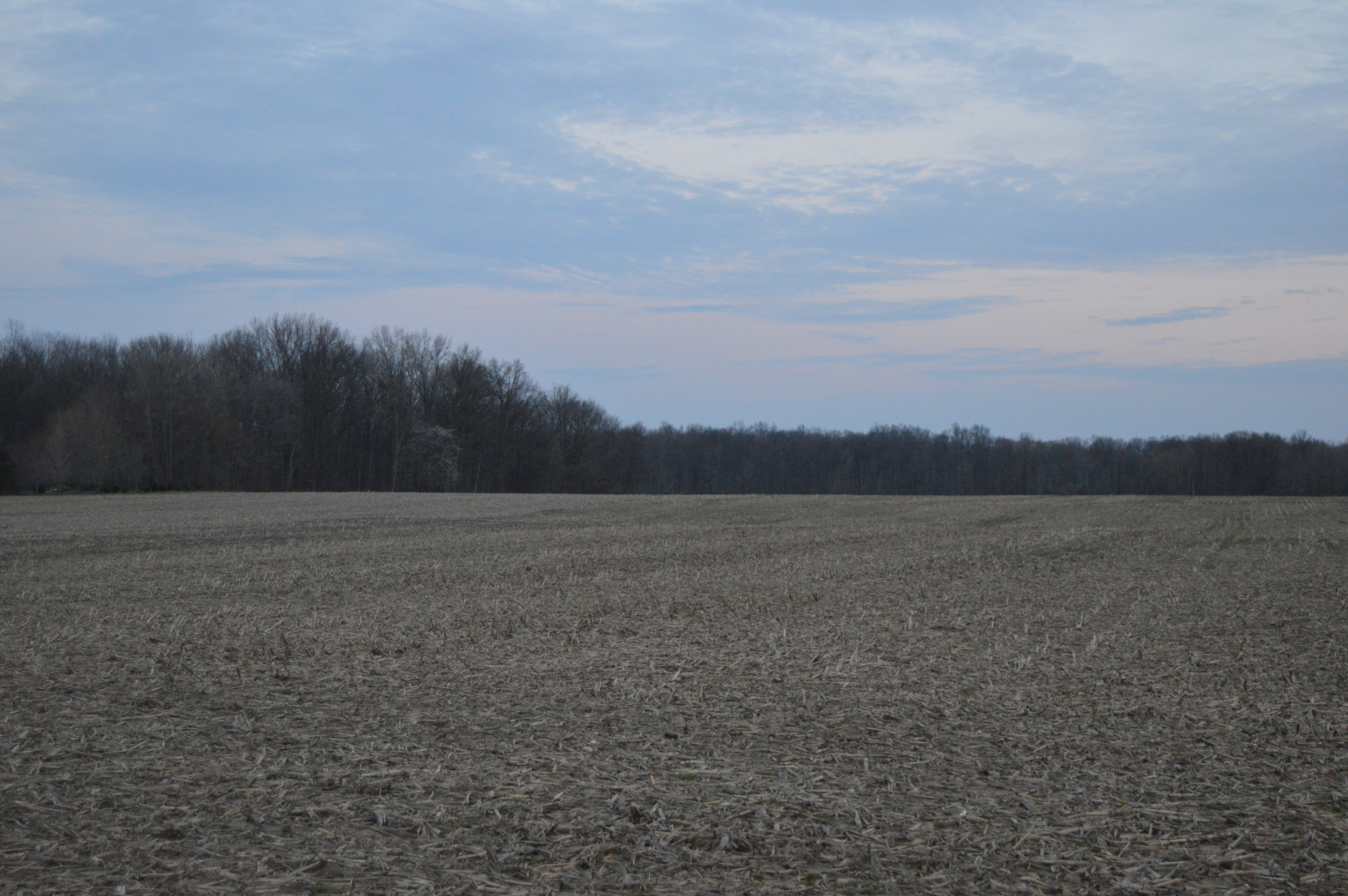
- Agricultural scene on Sperry Road

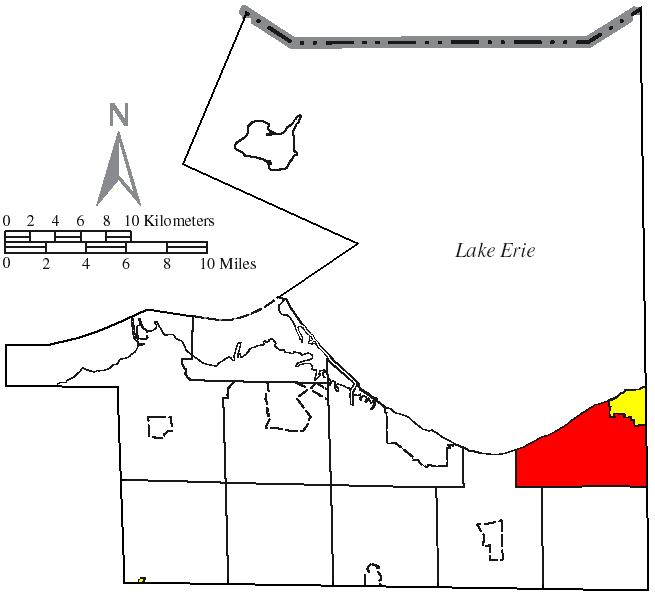
- Location of Vermilion Township (red) in Erie County, adjacent to the city of Vermilion
- Coordinates: 41°24′26″N 82°23′13″W
- Country: United States
- State: Ohio
- County: Erie

Area
  - Total: 22.2 sq mi (57.5 km^{2})
  - Land: 19.9 sq mi (51.6 km^{2})
  - Water: 2.3 sq mi (6.0 km^{2})
- Elevation: 620 ft (189 m)

Population (2020)
  - Total: 4,857
  - Density: 244/sq mi (94.1/km^{2})
- Time zone: UTC-5 (Eastern (EST))
  - Summer (DST): UTC-4 (EDT)
- ZIP code: 44089
- Area code: 440
- FIPS code: 39-79730
- GNIS feature ID: 1086071
- Website: www.vermiliontownship.com

Vermilion Township is one of the nine townships of Erie County, Ohio, United States. It is part of the Sandusky, Ohio metropolitan statistical area. As of the 2020 census the population was 4,857.

== Geography ==
Located in the northeastern corner of the county along Lake Erie, it borders the following townships:

- Brownhelm Township, Lorain County - east
- Henrietta Township, Lorain County - southeast corner
- Florence Township - south
- Berlin Township - southwest

Part of the city of Vermilion is located in northeastern Vermilion Township along the shoreline of Lake Erie. The census-designated place of Beulah Beach is located in the western part of the township, adjacent to Lake Erie, while Mitiwanga is shared with Berlin Township

== Name and history ==
- It is the only Vermilion Township statewide, although there is a Vermillion Township in Ashland County. (Originally both of these townships had used the same double-L spelling, "Vermillion".)
- Vermilion Township was named from the Vermilion River. This township was established about 1808, and it originally extended westward all the way to the Huron River. However, that western section was later annexed onto Huron Township and Berlin Township.

== Government ==
The township is governed by a three-member board of trustees who are elected in November of odd-numbered years to a four-year term beginning on the following January 1. Two are elected in the year after the presidential election and one is elected in the year before it. There is also an elected township fiscal officer, who serves a four-year term beginning on April 1 of the year after the election, which is held in November of the year before the presidential election. Vacancies in the fiscal officership or on the board of trustees are filled by the remaining trustees.
