= Townsend Township, Sandusky County, Ohio =

Township in Ohio, US

- Township
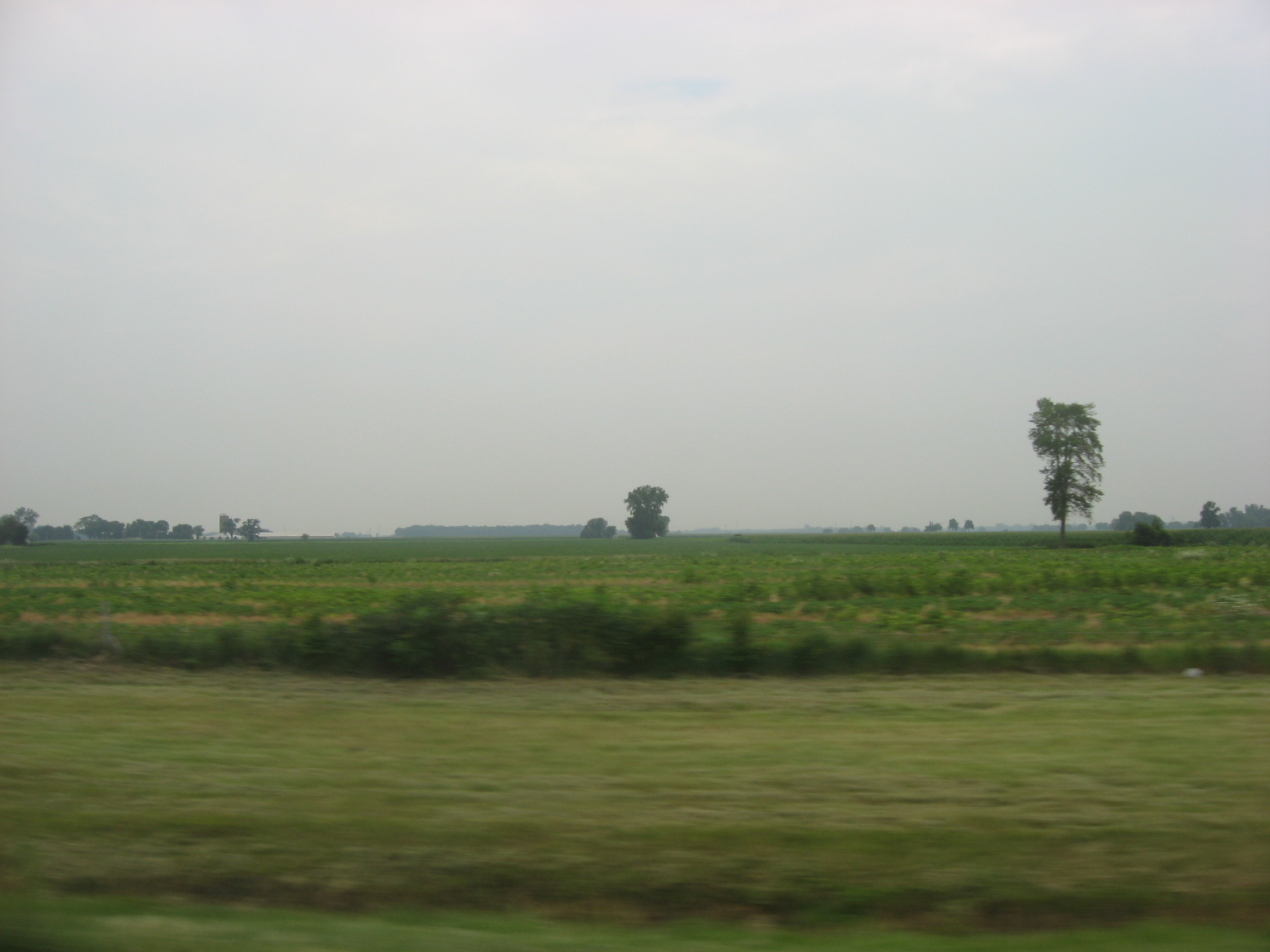
- Across the broad fields of rural Townsend Township

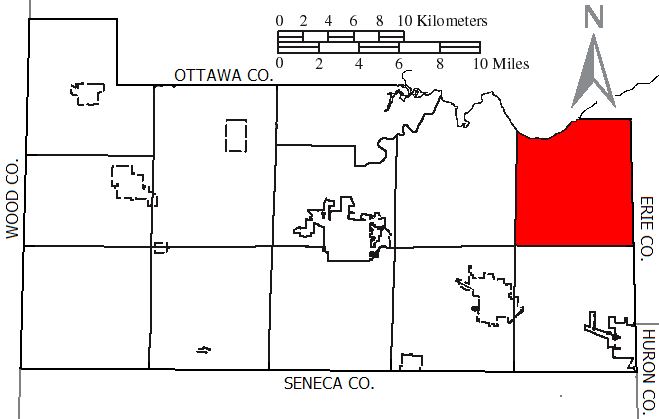
- Location of Townsend Township, Sandusky County, Ohio
- Coordinates: 41°23′6″N 82°54′15″W
- Country: United States
- State: Ohio
- County: Sandusky

Area
  - Total: 33.8 sq mi (87.6 km^{2})
  - Land: 32.5 sq mi (84.1 km^{2})
  - Water: 1.4 sq mi (3.5 km^{2})
- Elevation: 604 ft (184 m)

Population (2020)
  - Total: 1,523
  - Density: 47/sq mi (18.1/km^{2})
- Time zone: UTC-5 (Eastern (EST))
  - Summer (DST): UTC-4 (EDT)
- FIPS code: 39-77162
- GNIS feature ID: 1086918
- Website: https://www.townsendtownship.org/

Townsend Township is one of the twelve townships of Sandusky County, Ohio, United States. As of the 2020 census, 1,523 people lived in the township.

== Geography ==
Located in the northeastern corner of the county, it borders the following townships:

- Margaretta Township, Erie County - northeast
- Groton Township, Erie County - southeast
- York Township - south
- Green Creek Township - southwest corner
- Riley Township - west

No municipalities are located in Townsend Township, although the census-designated places of Vickery and Whites Landing are located in the township's west and north.

== Name and history ==
Statewide, the only other Townsend Township is located in Huron County.

== Government ==
The township is governed by a three-member board of trustees, who are elected in November of odd-numbered years to a four-year term beginning on the following January 1. Two are elected in the year after the presidential election and one is elected in the year before it. There is also an elected township fiscal officer, who serves a four-year term beginning on April 1 of the year after the election, which is held in November of the year before the presidential election. Vacancies in the fiscal officership or on the board of trustees are filled by the remaining trustees.
