= Bloomingville, Ohio =

Unincorporated community in Ohio, U.S.

Coordinates: 41°21′18″N 82°43′38″W

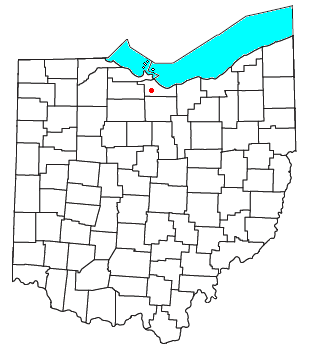
Location of Bloomingville, Ohio

Bloomingville is an unincorporated community and census-designated place in northern Oxford Township, Erie County, Ohio, United States. As of the 2020 census, Bloomingville had a population of 255. It is part of the Sandusky Metropolitan Statistical Area. Bloomingville is located at the intersection of Mason Road and Patten Tract Road. The Oxford Grange Hall located where Taylor Road forks off from Mason was the center of community life for many years.

The compact community consisted primarily of farmhouses clustered near the main intersection. Many of the farmhouses had working farms adjoining them or nearby. To the northeast lay an unused tract of 9,000 acres (36 km^{2}) that had been the site of a World War II munitions factory. In 1957, NASA acquired part of this tract for its Plum Brook Station and by 1963 had acquired the rest of the tract to build additional facilities there.

In 1984 a large golf course called Woussickett opened on Mason Road, west of Patten Tract Road.

The Erie Sand Barrens State Nature Preserve is located 1.4 miles east-northeast of Bloomingville on Scheid Road just off Taylor Road. The Sand Barrens are a remnant of Lake Warren, a glacial predecessor of today's Lake Erie.

== History ==
The first permanent settlement was made at Bloomingville in 1811 on the site of a former Indian camping ground. Bloomingville was laid out in 1817. A post office called Bloomingville was established in 1815, and remained in operation until 1906.
