= Huron Township, Erie County, Ohio =

Township in Ohio, US

- Township
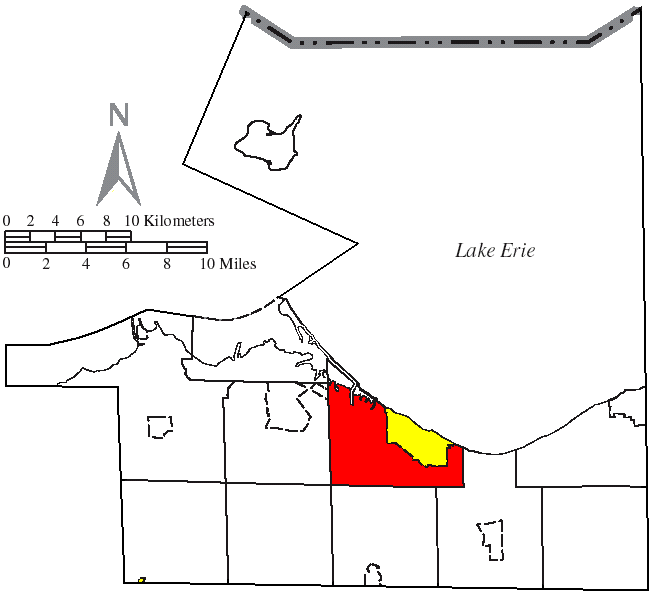
- Location of Huron Township (red) in Erie County, adjacent to the city of Huron (yellow)
- Coordinates: 41°23′52″N 82°34′49″W
- Country: United States
- State: Ohio
- County: Erie

Area
  - Total: 27.8 sq mi (72.0 km^{2})
  - Land: 23.1 sq mi (59.9 km^{2})
  - Water: 4.7 sq mi (12.1 km^{2})
- Elevation: 594 ft (181 m)

Population (2020)
  - Total: 10,724
  - Density: 464/sq mi (179/km^{2})
- Time zone: UTC-5 (Eastern (EST))
  - Summer (DST): UTC-4 (EDT)
- ZIP code: 44839
- Area code: 419
- FIPS code: 39-37030
- GNIS feature ID: 1086064
- Website: hurontwp.com

Huron Township is one of the nine townships of Erie County, Ohio, United States. It is part of the Sandusky, Ohio metropolitan area, with the city of Sandusky to the northwest. The township sits along the southwestern shoreline of Lake Erie, one of the Great Lakes. As of the 2020 census the population was 10,724.

== Geography ==
Located in the northern part of the county along Lake Erie, it borders the following townships and city:

- Berlin Township - southeast
- Milan Township - south
- Oxford Township - southwest corner
- Perkins Township - west
- City of Sandusky - northwest

The city of Huron occupies the center half of surrounding Huron Township's south shoreline along Lake Erie.

== Name and history ==
The Township of Huron was established by 1809; it has kept this name since that time. It was briefly combined with (now) Milan Township (originally named "Avery Township") for judicial districting purposes.

Huron village, at the mouth of the Huron River, was established about 1824, when the harbor was created, and the village quickly sprang up around it.

The township was the former location of several French-Canadian fur traders migrating south from New France and north from French Louisiana during the years of the French and Indian War (1755-1763), when the Kingdom of France ceded its North American possessions in Canada to the British, and Louisiana to the Kingdom of Spain in 1763. Many Native American tribes frequented this area, and hunted and fished along with the French. Gabriel Hunot traded here in the 1780s, and fur trader Jean B. Flammand (aka "John B. Flemming") came here to trade about 1805 and remained as a permanent settler. "Flemmings Cove" was named for him.

It is the only Huron Township statewide.

== Government ==
The township is governed by a three-member board of trustees, who are elected in November of odd-numbered years to a four-year term beginning on the following January 1. Two are elected in the year after the presidential election and one is elected in the year before it. There is also an elected township fiscal officer, who serves a four-year term beginning on April 1 of the year after the election, which is held in November of the year before the presidential election. Vacancies in the fiscal officership or on the board of trustees are filled by the remaining trustees.
