= Milan Township, Erie County, Ohio =

Township in Ohio, US

- Township
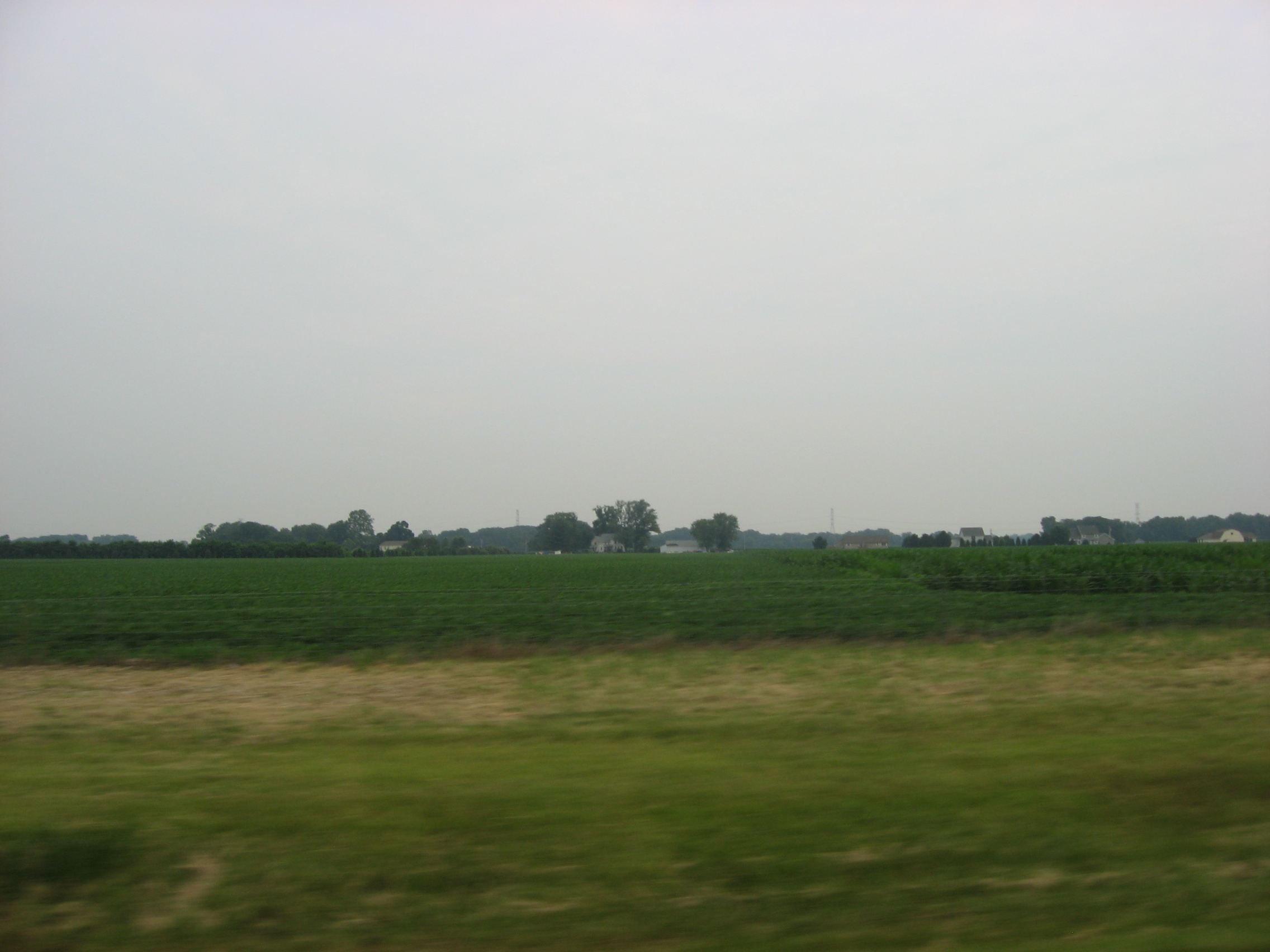
- Fields and houses in Milan Township

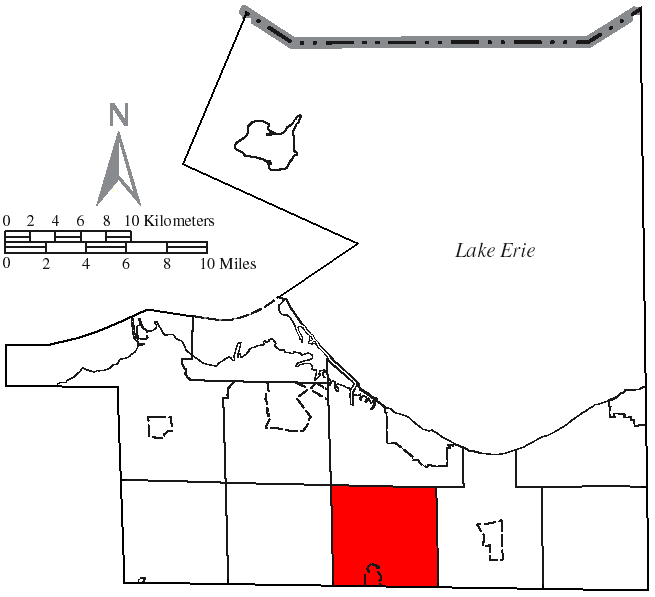
- Location of Milan Township in Erie County
- Coordinates: 41°18′46″N 82°35′51″W
- Country: United States
- State: Ohio
- County: Erie

Area
  - Total: 25.9 sq mi (67.1 km^{2})
  - Land: 25.5 sq mi (66.1 km^{2})
  - Water: 0.39 sq mi (1.0 km^{2})
- Elevation: 581 ft (177 m)

Population (2020)
  - Total: 3,580
  - Density: 140/sq mi (54.2/km^{2})
- Time zone: UTC-5 (Eastern (EST))
  - Summer (DST): UTC-4 (EDT)
- ZIP code: 44846
- Area code: 419
- FIPS code: 39-50148
- GNIS feature ID: 1086067
- Website: www.milantwp.org

Milan Township is one of the nine townships of Erie County, Ohio, United States. It is part of the Sandusky, Ohio metropolitan statistical area, which is also the county seat of Erie County. As of the 2020 census 3,580 people lived in the township.

== Geography ==
Located in the southern part of the county, it borders the following townships:

- Huron Township - north
- Berlin Township - east
- Townsend Township, Huron County - southeast corner
- Norwalk Township, Huron County - south
- Ridgefield Township, Huron County - southwest corner
- Oxford Township - west
- Perkins Township - northwest corner

The village of Milan is located in southern Milan Township, and the unincorporated community of Avery (formerly 'Spears Corners'), formerly the center of the township's life, lies in the township's west.

== Name and history ==
In 1787, the village of "Petquotting"/"New Salem" was established by the Moravian Indians (about 3 miles (5 km) north of present Milan village); they abandoned this village by 1791, but returned in 1804, until about 1808, to a new location within the now village of Milan.

Milan Township was originally established about 1808 as "Avery Township". It was shortly later combined with Huron Township for civil and judicial district purposes; and it became Milan Township by 1821. The present site of Avery (centrally located within this township) was formerly named 'Spears Corners".

== Government ==
The township is governed by a three-member board of trustees, who are elected in November of odd-numbered years to a four-year term beginning on the following January 1. Two are elected in the year after the presidential election and one is elected in the year before it. There is also an elected township fiscal officer, who serves a four-year term beginning on April 1 of the year after the election, which is held in November of the year before the presidential election. Vacancies in the fiscal officership or on the board of trustees are filled by the remaining trustees.
