= Huron, Ohio =

- City
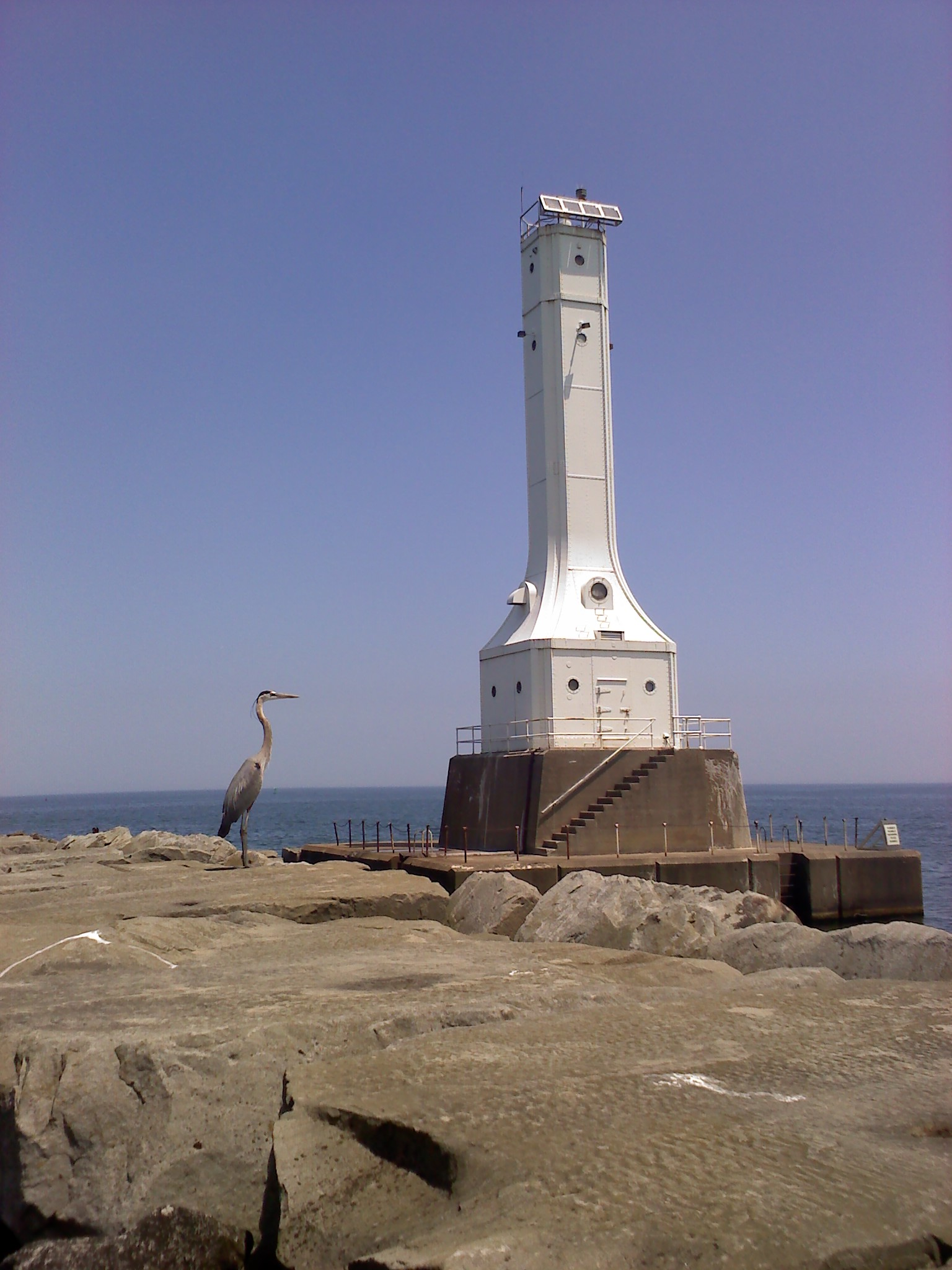
- Harbor Light in Huron

- Motto: "A Great Lake Place"
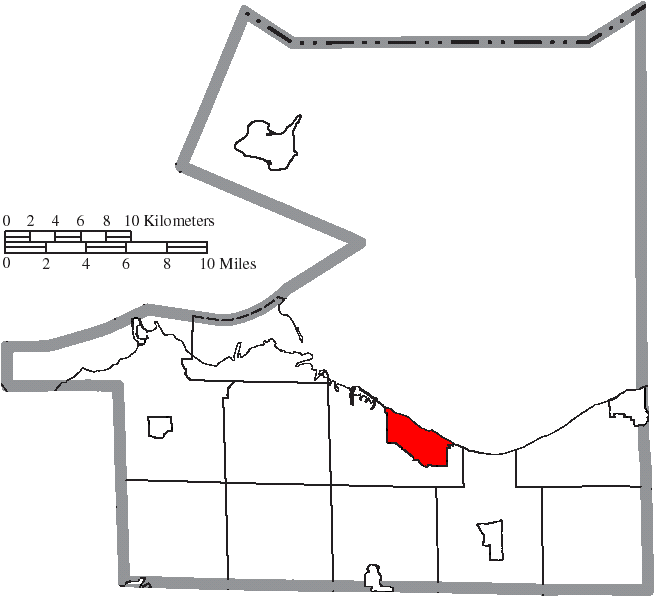
- Location of Huron in Erie County

- Location within Ohio Location within the United States
- Coordinates: 41°22′59″N 82°33′34″W
- Country: United States
- State: Ohio
- County: Erie

Government
  - Type: Council-manager
  - Mayor: Monty Tapp
  - City Manager: Stuart Hamilton

Area
  - Total: 7.91 sq mi (20.48 km^{2})
  - Land: 4.94 sq mi (12.80 km^{2})
  - Water: 2.96 sq mi (7.67 km^{2})
- Elevation: 591 ft (180 m)

Population (2020)
  - Total: 6,922
  - Density: 1,400.3/sq mi (540.65/km^{2})
- Time zone: UTC-5 (Eastern (EST))
  - Summer (DST): UTC-4 (EDT)
- ZIP Codes: 44839
- Area codes: 419 and 567
- FIPS code: 39-37016
- GNIS ID: 2394457
- Website: cityofhuron.org

Huron is a city in Erie County, Ohio, United States, located at the mouth of the Huron River on Lake Erie. The population was 6,922 at the 2020 census. It is near Sandusky, Ohio.

== History ==
Huron Township was at the center of the "Firelands" region of the Connecticut Western Reserve. The first permanent settler in the area that became Huron Township was a Quebec-born trapper, trader and interpreter named John Baptiste Flammand (or, "Flemming"; and often misspelled "Flemmond"), who established a trading post about 1805, approx. two miles inland upon the east bank of the Huron River. Other French traders had preceded him, including Gabriel Hunot in the 1780s.

Huron Township was established in 1809. Huron Village was later established between 1821 and 1824, when a town plat was surveyed, and port facilities at the mouth of the Huron River were developed; and the village quickly became a major shipbuilding center in the 1830s. (The community of Huron is sometimes mistaken to have been the same as the "town plat of Huron", also known as "the old County Seat" village, which was established about 1814, and was actually within the present Milan Township, formerly known as Avery Township before 1821).

The Wheeling and Lake Erie Railroad greatly expanded Huron's port on the east bank of the Huron River beginning in 1880. The first cargo of iron ore at the W&LE docks was received May 21, 1884. The port is no longer in use today, but when operating accepted cargoes of iron ore and limestone from lake freighters. Huron was also the home port of several commercial fishing fleets before unbridled lake pollution decimated the industry on Lake Erie by the early 1970s. Water quality in Lake Erie has greatly improved as a result of strong environmental controls since then and sport fishing has increased in popularity in the area. However, the Lake faces new threats from algal blooms and several invasive species such as zebra mussels and Asian carp that may impact sport fishing in the future.

== Geography ==
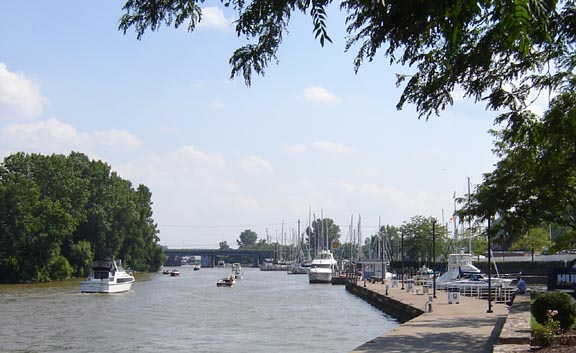
Mouth of the Huron River

According to the United States Census Bureau, the city has a total area of 7.73 square miles (20.02 km^{2}), of which 4.84 square miles (12.54 km^{2}) is land and 2.89 square miles (7.49 km^{2}) is water.

== Demographics ==
Historical population
Census	Pop.	Note	%±
1840	488		—
1860	802		—
1870	697		−13.1%
1880	1,038		48.9%
1890	1,380		32.9%
1900	1,708		23.8%
1910	1,756		2.8%
1920	1,703		−3.0%
1930	1,699		−0.2%
1940	1,827		7.5%
1950	2,515		37.7%
1960	5,197		106.6%
1970	6,896		32.7%
1980	7,123		3.3%
1990	7,030		−1.3%
2000	7,958		13.2%
2010	7,149		−10.2%
2020	6,922		−3.2%

The median income for a household in the city was $59,766, and the median income for a family was $73,068. Male full-time, year-round workers had a median income of $51,003 versus $41,667 for female full-time, year-round workers. The per capita income for the city was $29,213. About 2.5% of families and 5% of the population were below the poverty line, including 2.6% of those under age 18 and 5.6% of those age 65 or over.

=== 2020 census ===
As of the 2020 census, Huron had a population of 6,922. The median age was 48.3 years. 18.9% of residents were under the age of 18 and 25.4% of residents were 65 years of age or older. For every 100 females there were 93.4 males, and for every 100 females age 18 and over there were 89.6 males age 18 and over. 98.1% of residents lived in urban areas, while 1.9% lived in rural areas.

There were 3,110 households in Huron, of which 23.7% had children under the age of 18 living in them. Of all households, 46.8% were married-couple households, 17.8% were households with a male householder and no spouse or partner present, and 28.6% were households with a female householder and no spouse or partner present. About 33.2% of all households were made up of individuals and 16.0% had someone living alone who was 65 years of age or older.

There were 3,847 housing units, of which 19.2% were vacant. The homeowner vacancy rate was 1.3% and the rental vacancy rate was 9.8%.

Racial composition as of the 2020 census
Race	Number	Percent
White	6,411	92.6%
Black or African American	66	1.0%
American Indian and Alaska Native	16	0.2%
Asian	34	0.5%
Native Hawaiian and Other Pacific Islander	3	0.0%
Some other race	40	0.6%
Two or more races	352	5.1%
Hispanic or Latino (of any race)	193	2.8%

=== 2010 Census ===
As of the 2010 census, there were 7,149 people, 3,073 households, and 1,988 families residing in the city. The population density was 1,477.1 inhabitants per square mile (570.3/km^{2}). There were 3,710 housing units at an average density of 766.5 per square mile (295.9/km^{2}). The racial makeup of the city was 96.4% White, 0.9% African American, 0.3% Native American, 0.5% Asian, 0.3% from other races, and 1.5% from two or more races. Hispanic or Latino of any race were 2.3% of the population.

There were 3,073 households, of which 29.1% had children under the age of 18 living with them, 49.6% were married couples living together, 10.8% had a female householder with no husband present, 4.2% had a male householder with no wife present, and 35.3% were non-families. 29.5% of all households were made up of individuals, and 11.9% had someone living alone who was 65 years of age or older. The average household size was 2.30 and the average family size was 2.84.

The median age in the city was 43.9 years. 22.7% of residents were under the age of 18; 6.7% were between the ages of 18 and 24; 22% were from 25 to 44; 30.2% were from 45 to 64; and 18.4% were 65 years of age or older. The gender makeup of the city was 48.1% male and 51.9% female.

== Economy ==
Commercial and industrial development of Huron had historically been centered around the riverfront port area. By the early 1960s a busy downtown business district had developed, serving local residents and summer tourists. However, with improvements to U.S. Route 6 and Ohio Route 2 bypassing the downtown area and enabling quicker travel to larger neighboring cities, downtown Huron went into decline. Beginning in 1967, the City of Huron embarked on a controversial urban renewal program with funding from various programs of the U.S. federal government including the United States Department of Housing and Urban Development, and the State of Ohio. The city purchased, in some cases by eminent domain, and demolished 38 commercial buildings and private homes. It then built a municipal marina, called the Huron Boat Basin, as the focal point of a new downtown. While the "Boat Basin" has become a popular community park and gathering place, extensive redevelopment of the downtown area did not occur as quickly as envisioned. New industry and commercial development has more recently occurred on the southern and western city limits and suburbs.

=== ConAgra site renewal ===
On July 18, 2006, the Ohio Department of Natural Resources (ODNR) announced the purchase of a ConAgra Foods facility in Huron. Concurrently, ConAgra Foods announced the closure of the grain elevator. The 19.8-acre (80,000 m2) parcel is a key piece of Huron's waterfront. The Ohio Department of Natural Resources (ODNR), Division of Watercraft has completed a public boating and fishing access site with launch ramps, docks and parking facilities. The City of Huron assumed title to the former grain silos and flour mill and received a grant to demolish the building, which was completed in August 2012. It envisions a future riverfront development to include restaurants, retail stores, condominiums and greenspace.

On January 8, 2012, much of the former Con-Agra mill structure was demolished by implosion in a public event attracting media attention and a large crowd. The former grain silos were removed by manual demolition.

== Education ==
=== Primary and secondary ===
The Huron City School District has three schools for each level of public education:

- Woodlands Elementary School
- McCormick Middle School
- Huron High School

Huron City Schools sports teams are known as the "Tigers". The Huron Tigers have recorded numerous athletic successes for both boys' and girls' scholastic sports competitions.

=== Postsecondary ===
BGSU Firelands, a branch campus of Bowling Green State University, is located just west of the city limits. A separate college of the Bowling Green State University system, BGSU Firelands, has been a regional campus of Bowling Green since 1968. Over 2,000 students in 2006 were enrolled for a wide variety of associate, bachelors and graduate degree programs. Huron was also the home of the "Huron Playhouse", formerly a division of Bowling Green State University's Department of Theater and Film before becoming an independent, non-profit corporation.

== Transportation ==
The Yellow Line of the Sandusky Transit System has a stop in Huron at Sawmill Creek The historic Lake Shore and Michigan Southern Railway owned by Norfolk Southern Railway runs through Huron carrying freight trains as well as Amtrak trains. The city does not have a train station.

The small privately owned Hinde Airport operates in and serves Huron, although most in Huron fly through surrounding major airports such as Cleveland Hopkins International Airport Huron is easily accessible from interstates 80 and 90 as the city lies approximately 5 miles north of them. The only U.S highway that runs through Huron is U.S. Route 6. The two state highways that run through Huron are Route 2 and Route 13 which has its northern terminus in Huron.

== Notable people ==
- Sebastian C. Adams (1825–1898), writer, minister, politician
- Jim Campbell (1924–1995), Major League Baseball executive for Detroit Tigers
- Suzy Dietrich (1926–2015), amateur sports car racing driver
- John J. Nichols (born 1969 or 1970), retired U.S. Air Force major general
- Paul Doyle (1939–2020), Major League Baseball pitcher
- Matt Maloney (born 1984), Major League Baseball pitcher for the Cincinnati Reds and the Minnesota Twins
- John Oller (born 1956), author and former attorney
- Ethel Swanbeck (1893–1989), member of the Ohio House of Representatives (1955–1976)
- D. J. Swearingen (born 1987), member of the Ohio House Of Representatives (2019-present)
- Cody Thompson (born 1996), football player for the Toledo Rockets
