= National Register of Historic Places listings in Huron County, Ohio =

Location of Huron County in Ohio

This is a list of the National Register of Historic Places listings in Huron County, Ohio.

This is intended to be a complete list of the properties and districts on the National Register of Historic Places in Huron County, Ohio, United States. The locations of National Register properties and districts for which the latitude and longitude coordinates are included below, may be seen in an online map.

There are 18 properties and districts listed on the National Register in the county. Another 2 properties were once listed but have been removed.

This National Park Service list is complete through NPS recent listings posted April 24, 2026.

== Current listings ==
| | Name on the Register | Image | Date listed | Location | City or town | Description |
|---|---|---|---|---|---|---|
| 1 | Seth Brown House | Seth Brown House | May 3, 1974 (#74001531) | 29 Brown St. 41°14′41″N 82°41′49″W | Monroeville | |
| 2 | Dunton House | Dunton House | December 16, 1982 (#82001469) | 130 Benedict Ave. 41°14′13″N 82°36′43″W | Norwalk | |
| 3 | Gregory House | Gregory House | February 24, 1984 (#84003746) | 1 E. Main St. 41°05′08″N 82°23′57″W | New London | |
| 4 | John Hosford House | John Hosford House | May 3, 1974 (#74001532) | 64 Sandusky St. 41°14′45″N 82°41′46″W | Monroeville | |
| 5 | Hunts Corners | Hunts Corners | September 2, 1993 (#93000896) | Junction of Sandhill Rd. and State Route 547 at Hunts Corners; 41°13′37″N 82°45′26″W | Lyme Township | One of Huron County's oldest communities, founded in 1811 |
| 6 | Huron County Children's Home | Huron County Children's Home | October 27, 2004 (#04001200) | 190 Benedict Ave. 41°13′55″N 82°36′30″W | Norwalk | |
| 7 | Huron County Courthouse and Jail | Huron County Courthouse and Jail | July 12, 1974 (#74001534) | E. Main St. and Benedict Ave. 41°14′31″N 82°36′55″W | Norwalk | |
| 8 | Macksville Tavern | Macksville Tavern | May 3, 1976 (#76001457) | Peru Hollow Rd. 41°10′11″N 82°38′32″W | Peru Township | |
| 9 | Mead-Zimmerman House | Mead-Zimmerman House | March 30, 1978 (#78002089) | East of Greenwich on State Route 13; 41°00′56″N 82°29′08″W | Greenwich Township | |
| 10 | Miller-Bissell Farmstead | Miller-Bissell Farmstead | September 23, 2002 (#02001058) | 581 State Route 60, north of New London; 41°07′19″N 82°24′34″W | New London Township | |
| 11 | Norwalk Memorial Hospital | Norwalk Memorial Hospital | June 21, 2007 (#07000582) | 269 W. Main St. 41°14′01″N 82°38′17″W | Norwalk | |
| 12 | Norwalk Theatre | Norwalk Theatre | August 29, 2022 (#100008039) | 57 East Main St. 41°14′37″N 82°36′49″W | Norwalk | |
| 13 | Phoenix Mills | Phoenix Mills | May 28, 1975 (#75001440) | East of Steuben on Mill Rd. 41°05′57″N 82°39′53″W | Greenfield Township | |
| 14 | Plymouth Historic District | Plymouth Historic District | December 7, 2018 (#100003245) | Roughly bounded by Dix, Trux, Mills, and New Railroad Sts. 40°59′43″N 82°40′02″W | Plymouth | Extends into Richland County |
| 15 | Tremont House | Tremont House | March 31, 2006 (#06000201) | 101-103 E. Main St. 41°16′26″N 82°50′26″W | Bellevue | |
| 16 | West Main Street District | West Main Street District | February 27, 1974 (#74001535) | In an irregular pattern, both sides of W. Main St. for 6 blocks from the western edge of business district 41°14′20″N 82°37′30″W | Norwalk | |
| 17 | John Wright Mansion | John Wright Mansion | February 27, 1974 (#74001530) | State Route 113 west of State Route 4, northeast of Bellevue; 41°16′53″N 82°47′25″W | Lyme Township | |
| 18 | Zion Episcopal Church | Zion Episcopal Church | May 3, 1974 (#74001533) | Ridge St. at Monroe St. 41°14′35″N 82°42′13″W | Monroeville | |

== Former listings ==
| | Name on the Register | Image | Date listed | Date removed | Location | City or town | Description |
|---|---|---|---|---|---|---|---|
| 1 | Baltimore and Ohio Railroad Depot | | March 31, 1975 (#75002166) | July 29, 1977 | B&O RR jct. | Willard | Former B&O railroad junction |
| 2 | Dr. David De Forest Benedict House | Dr. David De Forest Benedict House | January 23, 1975 (#75001439) | May 12, 2016 | 80 Seminary St. 41°14′34″N 82°36′42″W | Norwalk | |

== See also ==
- List of National Historic Landmarks in Ohio
- Listings in neighboring counties: Ashland, Crawford, Erie, Lorain, Richland, Sandusky, Seneca
- National Register of Historic Places listings in Ohio
