= Holiday Lakes, Ohio =

- Census-designated place
- Location within Ohio Location within the United States
- Coordinates: 41°05′32″N 82°43′45″W
- Country: United States
- State: Ohio
- County: Huron
- Townships: Greenfield, Norwich

Area
  - Total: 2.08 sq mi (5.40 km^{2})
  - Land: 1.73 sq mi (4.49 km^{2})
  - Water: 0.35 sq mi (0.91 km^{2})
- Elevation: 833 ft (254 m)

Population (2020)
  - Total: 828
  - Density: 477.7/sq mi (184.43/km^{2})
- Time zone: UTC-5 (Eastern (EST))
  - Summer (DST): UTC-4 (EDT)
- Area codes: 419 & 567
- GNIS feature ID: 2628902

Holiday Lakes is an unincorporated community and census-designated place in Huron County, Ohio, United States. Its population was 828 as of the 2020 census. Ohio State Route 99 passes through the community.

== Geography ==
According to the U.S. Census Bureau, the community has an area of 2.083 square miles (5.39 km^{2}); 1.733 square miles (4.49 km^{2}) of its area is land, and 0.350 square miles (0.91 km^{2}) is water.

== Demographics ==
Historical population
Census	Pop.	Note	%±
2010	749		—
2020	828		10.5%
U.S. Decennial Census
