= Steuben, Ohio =

Unincorporated community in Ohio, U.S.

Coordinates: 41°06′17″N 82°41′14″W

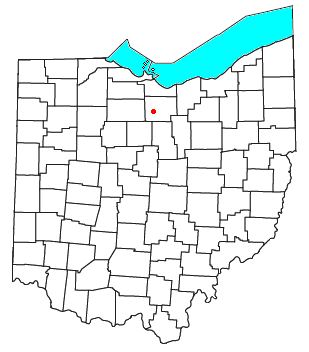
Location of Steuben, Ohio

Steuben (also Adaria, Greenfield, Greenfield Center, Lafayette, or Stuben) is an unincorporated community in central Greenfield Township, Huron County, Ohio, United States, located a few miles northeast of the village of Willard. It lies along State Route 162 approximately three miles (five kilometers) west of North Fairfield.

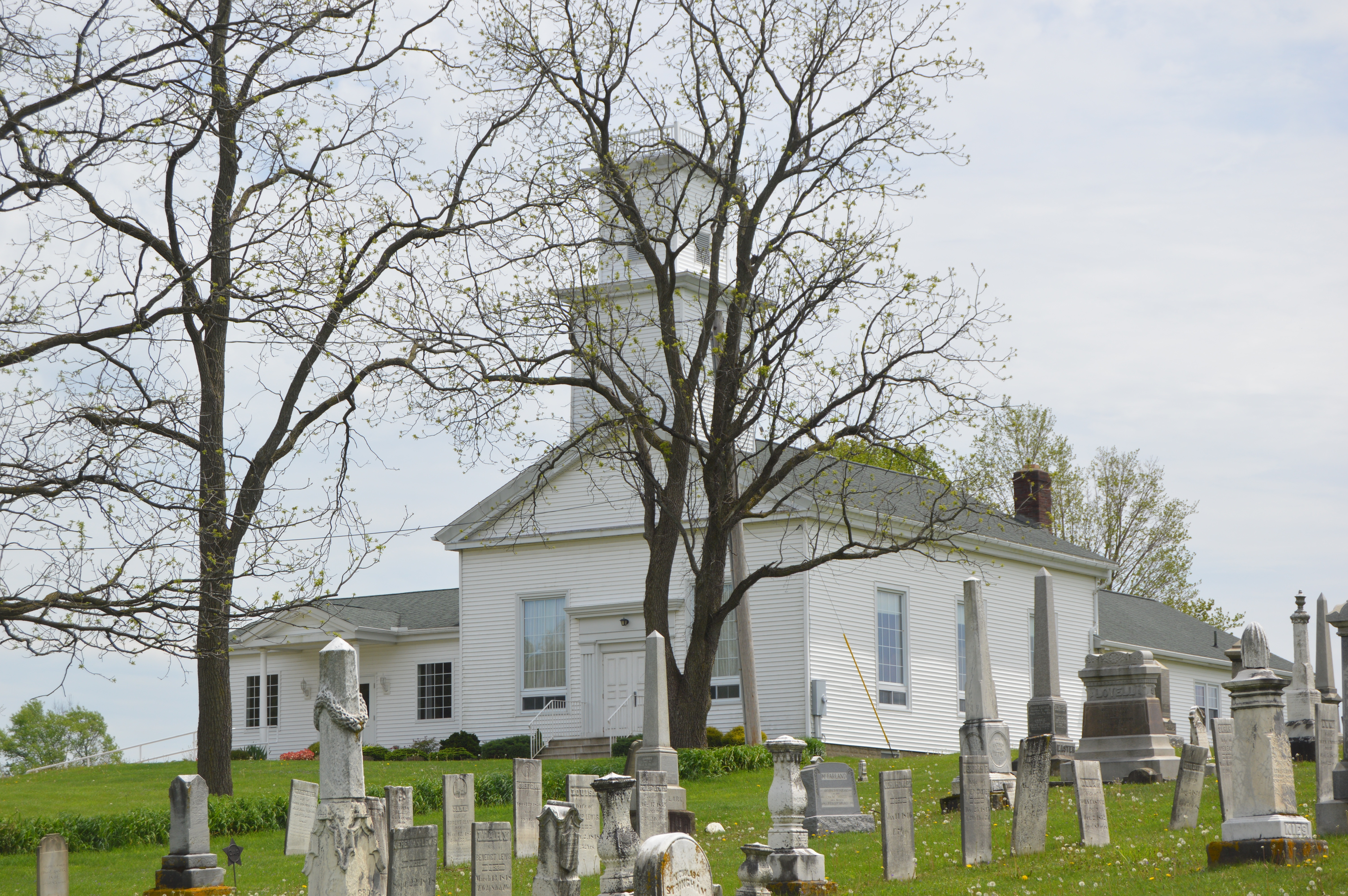
Church of the Master, built 1843

Steuben has two churches and an elementary school, Greenfield Elementary, which is part of the Willard City School District. It has no commercial buildings.
