= Ohio State Route 18 =

State highway in northern Ohio, US

State Route 18
- Route of SR 18 highlighted in red

Route information
- Maintained by ODOT
- Length: 197.39 mi (317.67 km)
- Existed: 1924–present

Major junctions
- West end: SR 8 near Hicksville
- US 127 in Sherwood; US 24 in Defiance; I-75 near North Baltimore; US 23 / SR 199 in Fostoria; US 20 from Bellevue to Norwalk; US 250 / SR 13 in Norwalk; US 42 / SR 3 in Medina; I-71 near Medina; I-77 / SR 21 near Fairlawn; I-76 in Akron
- East end: SR 91 in Akron

Location
- Country: United States
- State: Ohio
- Counties: Defiance, Henry, Wood, Hancock, Seneca, Sandusky, Huron, Lorain, Medina, Summit

Highway system
- Ohio State Highway System; Interstate; US; State; Scenic
← SR 17	→ SR 19

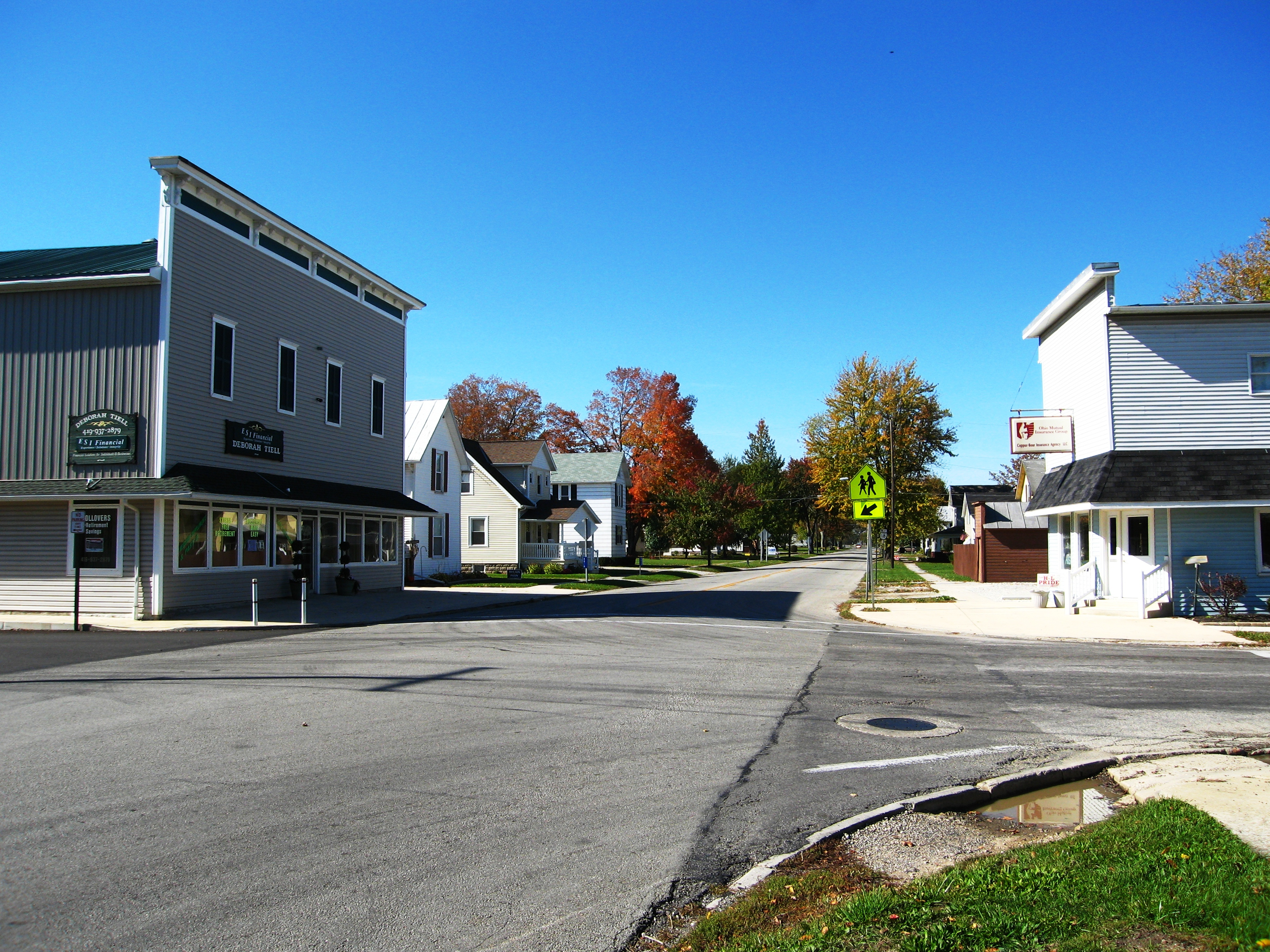
Ohio State Route 18 bisects the community of Bascom, where it also serves as the southern terminus of Ohio State Route 635.

State Route 18 (SR 18) is an east–west highway in northern Ohio. It is the sixth longest state route in the state. Its western terminus is at the Indiana state line near Hicksville, where the route continues in Indiana as State Road 8, and its eastern terminus is at State Route 91 in Akron.

== History ==
State Route 18 was an original state highway that went from Norwalk to the Pennsylvania state line. The route was extended to the Indiana state line in 1926. Until 1950, it was one of a very few Ohio routes to end at two state lines.

State Route 18's extension to the Indiana state line originally overlapped State Route 2 from the line to Hicksville. In 1940, State Route 18 was rerouted on the former State Route 193 from the line to Hicksville.

In 1950, State Route 18's eastern terminus was moved to Youngstown. Its old route to the Pennsylvania state line was recertified as State Route 289.

In 1966, the route was routed along State Route 8 and Interstate 80S (now Interstate 76) to Youngstown. This series of concurrencies ended in 1971, and State Route 18 would eventually be routed along Market Street in Akron, to end at its current terminus.

In 1969, State Route 18 was routed concurrently with U.S. Route 20 along the Norwalk Bypass, a limited access freeway. Prior to the Bypass route, State Route 18 followed Main Street and Woodlawn Avenue (formerly known as Medina Street) and later followed Main Street and Akron Road through the city of Norwalk (much of this alignment was already concurrent with US 20).

Before the rerouting of SR 18 via SR 8 and I-80S, SR 18 left West Market Street at Twin Oaks Drive in West Akron, where it went a few blocks east to North Portage Path, then jogged 1 block north to Memorial Parkway, which became Tallmadge Avenue east of the Cuyahoga River (before that, SR 18 continued along Market Street, then joined with SR 8 before reaching Tallmadge Avenue).

Tallmadge Road was a straight east/west road which became Mahoning Avenue as it approached the Youngstown area.

Most stretches of former SR 18 are still referred to as County Road 18 in Portage and Mahoning Counties.

SR 18 was realigned around North Baltimore on a two-lane 2.2-mile-long (3.5 km) bypass completed in 2012. The new bypass, which included a roundabout at the eastern transition to the original route, was built to facilitate traffic to a new CSX rail yard in Henry Township. The old route through North Baltimore became signed as SR 18 Business.

== Major intersections ==
County	Location	mi	km	Destinations	Notes
Defiance	Hicksville Township	0.00	0.00	SR 8 west / CR 58 (Buckskin Road) / State Line Road	Indiana state line
Defiance	Hicksville	3.10	4.99	SR 2 west / SR 49 south (West High Street) / South Main Street	Western end of SR 2 / SR 49 concurrency
Defiance	Hicksville	3.52	5.66	SR 2 east / SR 49 north (East High Street)	Eastern end of SR 2 / SR 49 concurrency
Defiance	Sherwood	14.12	22.72	US 127	
Defiance	Noble Township	22.30	35.89	SR 15 north – Ney, Bryan	Western end of SR 15 concurrency
Defiance	Defiance	23.57	37.93	US 24 – Antwerp, Napoleon	Exit 25 (US 24)
Defiance	Defiance	24.58	39.56	SR 66 north (North Clinton Street) / East Session Street	Western end of SR 66 concurrency
Defiance	Defiance	25.22	40.59	SR 111 west (Clinton Street) / West Second Street	Northern terminus of SR 111
Defiance	Defiance	25.36	40.81	SR 66 south (Jefferson Street)	Eastern end of SR 66 concurrency
Defiance	Defiance	25.85	41.60	SR 15 south (Douglas Street)	Eastern end of SR 15 concurrency
Defiance	Defiance	27.29	43.92	SR 281 west (Florence Avenue) to US 24 – Independence Dam State Park	Western end of SR 281 concurrency
Defiance	Richland Township	28.93	46.56	SR 281 east – Custar	Eastern end of SR 281 concurrency
Henry	Holgate	38.30	61.64	SR 108 (North Wilhelm Street) – Napoleon, Miller City	
Henry	Monroe–Marion township line	43.26	69.62	SR 109 north / CR G	Western end of SR 109 concurrency
Henry	Hamler	44.70	71.94	SR 109 south (North First Street)	Eastern end of SR 109 concurrency
Henry	Bartlow Township	49.85	80.23	SR 65 north / CR E – McClure	Western end of SR 65 concurrency
Henry	Bartlow Township	50.73	81.64	SR 65 south – Belmore	Eastern end of SR 65 concurrency
Wood	Jackson Township	59.00	94.95	SR 235 north	Western end of SR 235 concurrency
Wood	Hoytville	60.41	97.22	SR 235 south	Eastern end of SR 235 concurrency
Wood	Henry Township	64.65	104.04	SR 18 Bus. east	Western terminus of SR 18 Bus.
Wood	North Baltimore	66.29	106.68	SR 18 Bus. west (Main Street)	Eastern terminus of SR 18 Bus.; roundabout
Wood	North Baltimore	64.84	104.35	I-75 – Dayton, Toledo	Exit 167 (I-75)
Hancock	Cass Township	74.41	119.75	SR 613 west to I-75 – Van Buren	Western end of SR 613 concurrency
Hancock–Seneca county line	Fostoria	81.72	131.52	US 23 north / SR 199 north (North County Line Street) / SR 613 / West North Street	Eastern end of SR 613 concurrency; western end of US 23 / SR 199 concurrency; eastern terminus of SR 613
Seneca	Fostoria	82.54	132.84	SR 12 east (East South Street)	Western end of SR 12 concurrency
Seneca	Fostoria	82.59	132.92	SR 12 west (West Lytle Street)	Eastern end of SR 12 concurrency
Seneca	Fostoria	83.06	133.67	US 23 south / SR 199 south	Eastern end of US 23 / SR 199 concurrency
Seneca	Fostoria	84.18	135.47	SR 587 south	Northern terminus of SR 587
Seneca	Bascom	89.90	144.68	SR 635 north / CR 7	Southern terminus of SR 635
Seneca	Tiffin	93.81	150.97	US 224 – Findlay	
Seneca	Tiffin	95.61	153.87	SR 53 (Sandusky Street) / SR 101 begins	Western end of SR 101 concurrency
Seneca	Tiffin	96.16	154.75	SR 100 / SR 231 south (South Washington Street)	Northern terminus of SR 231 (at Market Street)
Seneca	Tiffin	96.63	155.51	SR 101 east (East Market Street)	Eastern end of SR 101 concurrency
Seneca	Republic	104.63	168.39	SR 67 south (South Kilbourne Street) / SR 162 east (West Jefferson Street) – Upper Sandusky, North Fairfield	Western end of SR 67 concurrency; western terminus of SR 162
Seneca	Republic	104.75	168.58	SR 19 / SR 67 ends – Bloomville, Green Springs	Eastern end of SR 67 concurrency
Sandusky	Bellevue	118.48	190.68	US 20 west (West Main Street) / Exchange Street	Western end of US 20 concurrency
Sandusky–Huron county line	Bellevue	118.52	190.74	SR 113 begins / SR 269-D (Northwest Street / Southwest Street)	Western end of SR 113 concurrency
Huron	Bellevue	118.61	190.88	SR 269 (Sandusky Street)	
Huron	Bellevue	119.49	192.30	SR 113 east – Milan	Eastern end of SR 113 concurrency
Huron	Bellevue	121.02	194.76	SR 4 to Ohio Turnpike – Bucyrus, Sandusky	
Huron	Monroeville	125.87	202.57	SR 99 / SR 547 Truck west (North Ridge Street) – Willard	Western end of SR 547 Truck concurrency
Huron	Monroeville	126.52	203.61	SR 547 west (Monroe Avenue) / SR 547 Truck ends / Milan Avenue	Eastern terminus of SR 547; eastern end of SR 547 Truck concurrency
Huron	Norwalk	128.97– 129.28	207.56– 208.06	To SR 61 – Norwalk	Interchange to unsigned SR 61-C; eastbound exit / westbound entrance only
Huron	Norwalk	132.01	212.45	US 250 / SR 13 to Ohio Turnpike – Norwalk, Ashland	Interchange
Huron	Norwalk Township	133.84	215.39	US 20 east / Woodlawn Avenue – Cleveland	Interchange; eastern end of US 20 concurrency
Huron	Norwalk–Townsend township line	135.62	218.26	SR 601 north / CR 51 (Greenwich Milan Town Line Road) – Milan	Southern terminus of SR 601
Huron	Clarksfield Township	143.21	230.47	SR 60 north / CR 186 (Zenobia Road) – Wakeman	Western end of SR 60 concurrency
Huron	Clarksfield Township	143.80	231.42	SR 60 south – New London	Eastern end of SR 60 concurrency
Lorain	Brighton Township	149.31	240.29	SR 511 – Oberlin, Ashland	
Lorain	Wellington	154.12	248.03	SR 58 (Main Street)	
Lorain	Penfield Township	159.15	256.13	SR 301 – Elyria, West Salem	
Medina	Litchfield Township	164.32	264.45	SR 83 (Avon Lake Road) – Lodi, Avon Lake	Traffic circle
Medina	York Township	169.45	272.70	SR 57 / SR 252 north / CR 24 (Columbia Road) – Olmsted Falls, Elyria	Western end of SR 57 concurrency; southern terminus of SR 252
Medina	Medina	173.50	279.22	US 42 south / SR 3 (Court Street)	Western end of SR 3 concurrency
Medina	Medina	173.57	279.33	SR 57 south (Broadway Street)	Eastern end of SR 57 concurrency
Medina	Medina	173.68	279.51	SR 3 north (Jefferson Street)	Eastern end of SR 3 concurrency
Medina	Medina–Montville township line	177.17	285.13	I-71 – Columbus, Cleveland	Exit 218 (I-71)
Medina	Granger–Sharon township line	180.28	290.13	SR 94 – Wadsworth, North Royalton	
Summit	Bath–Copley township line	184.70	297.25	I-77 / SR 21 – Akron, Cleveland	Exit 137 (I-77)
Summit	Akron	192.48	309.77	SR 162 west (Rand Avenue)	Western end of SR 162 concurrency
Summit	Akron	192.75	310.20	SR 261 west (High Street) / SR 162 ends	Eastern end of SR 162 concurrency
Summit	Akron	192.81	310.30	SR 261 east (Broadway)	
Summit	Akron	195.18	314.11	SR 241 south (Innovation Way) to I-76	Northern terminus of SR 241
Summit	Akron	196.27– 196.39	315.87– 316.06	I-76 / Mogadore Road – Lodi, Pittsburgh	Exit 26 (I-76)
Summit	Akron	197.36	317.62	SR 91 (Canton Road) / Robindale Avenue	
1.000 mi = 1.609 km; 1.000 km = 0.621 mi: Concurrency terminus; Incomplete access

== SR 18 Business ==
State Route 18 Business
- Location: North Baltimore
- Length: 1.934 mi (3.112 km)
- Existed: 2012–present

State Route 18 Business (SR 18 Bus.) is a 1.9-mile-long (3.1 km) business route through the village of North Baltimore in southern Wood County. The route starts at a T-intersection with SR 18 in Henry Township and runs east into North Baltimore on Deshler Road and West State Street. In the center of the village, the route heads south onto South Main Street. SR 18 Bus. ends at a roundabout with SR 18 in the southern limits of the village.

SR 18 Bus. was created in November 2012 along what used to be SR 18 through North Baltimore. When SR 18 was rerouted on a bypass of the village in 2012, the old route became a signed business route. Most of the business route was designated by the Ohio Department of Transportation as SR 18-J though a portion of the route near its western terminus was designated SR 18-C. As of 2017 those designations have been removed and ODOT no longer maintains the business route.
