= New Haven Township, Huron County, Ohio =

Township in Ohio, US

- Township
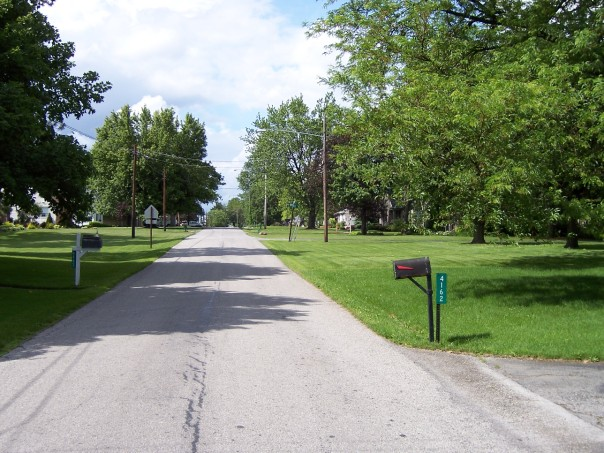
- Broadway Road in Celeryville
- Motto: "First Township in Huron County Ohio"
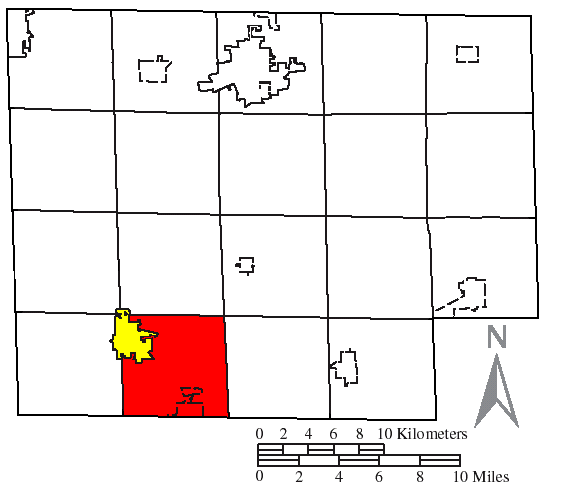
- Location of New Haven Township (red) in Huron County, next to the city of Willard (yellow)
- Coordinates: 41°1′29″N 82°40′30″W
- Country: United States
- State: Ohio
- County: Huron

Area
  - Total: 23.5 sq mi (60.9 km^{2})
  - Land: 23.1 sq mi (59.9 km^{2})
  - Water: 0.39 sq mi (1.0 km^{2})
- Elevation: 948 ft (289 m)

Population (2020)
  - Total: 2,409
  - Density: 104/sq mi (40.2/km^{2})
- Time zone: UTC-5 (Eastern (EST))
  - Summer (DST): UTC-4 (EDT)
- ZIP code: 44850
- Area code: 419
- FIPS code: 39-54712
- GNIS feature ID: 1086350
- Website: www.newhaventownship.com

New Haven Township is one of the nineteen townships of Huron County, Ohio, United States. As of the 2020 census the population of the township was 2,409.

== Geography ==
Located on the southern edge of the county, it borders the following townships:

- Greenfield Township - north
- Fairfield Township - northeast corner
- Ripley Township - east
- Cass Township, Richland County - southeast
- Plymouth Township, Richland County - south
- Auburn Township, Crawford County - southwest
- Richmond Township - west
- Norwich Township - northwest corner

Several populated places are located in or adjacent to New Haven Township:

- The city of Willard, bordering the township to the northwest
- Part of the village of Plymouth, in the south
- The census-designated place of Celeryville, on the border with Richmond Township in the northwest
- The census-designated place of New Haven, in the center.

== Name and history ==
New Haven Township was established in 1815. The township is named after New Haven, Connecticut, the native home of a share of the early settlers. It is the only New Haven Township statewide.

== Government ==
The township is governed by a three-member board of trustees, who are elected in November of odd-numbered years to a four-year term beginning on the following January 1. Two are elected in the year after the presidential election and one is elected in the year before it. There is also an elected township fiscal officer, who serves a four-year term beginning on April 1 of the year after the election, which is held in November of the year before the presidential election. Vacancies in the fiscal officership or on the board of trustees are filled by the remaining trustees.
