= Hunts Corners, Ohio =

Historic district in Ohio, United States

- Hunts Corners
- U.S. National Register of Historic Places
- U.S. Historic district
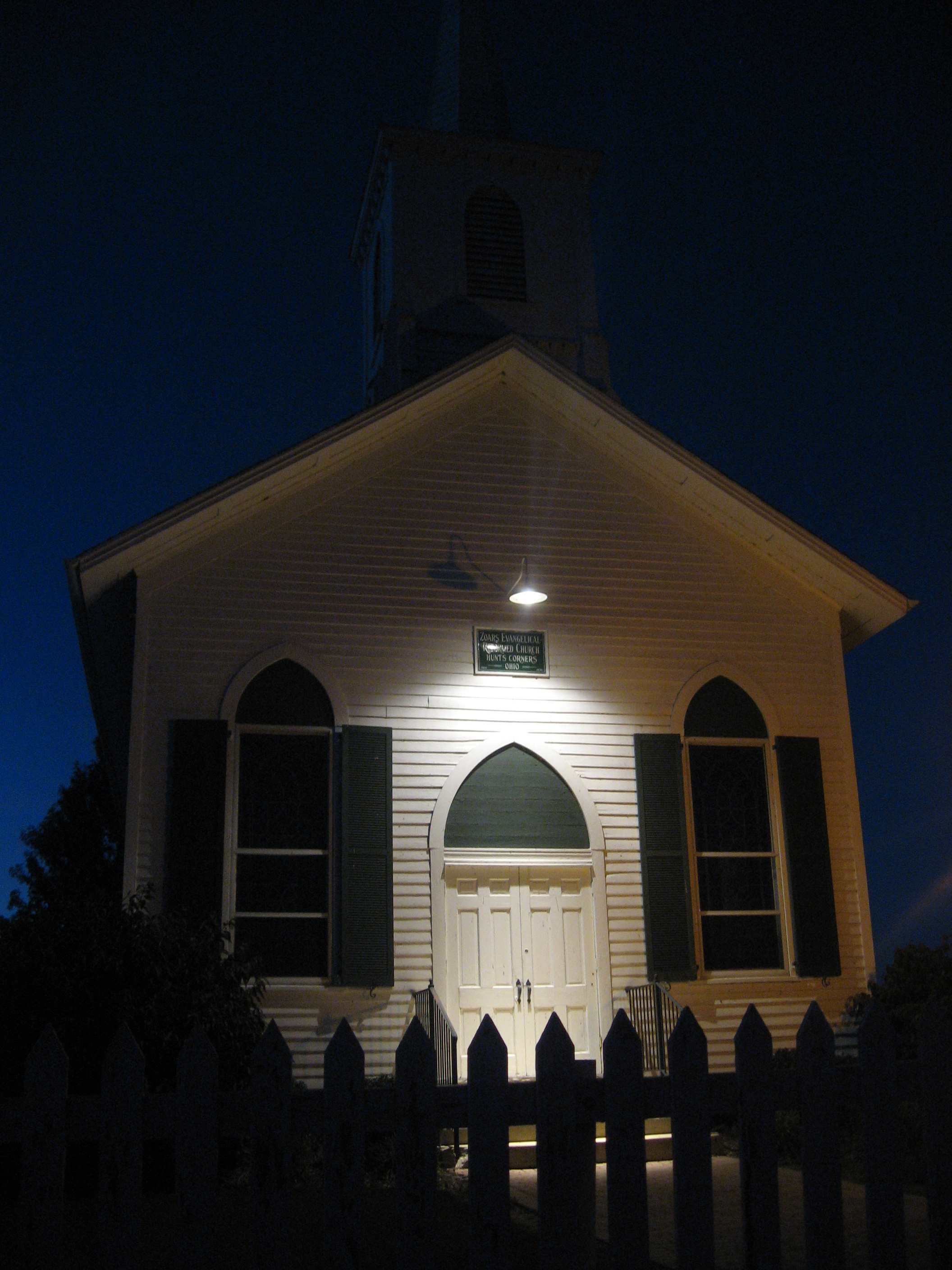
- The former United Church of Christ, now a museum

- Location within Ohio Location within the United States
- Nearest city: Monroeville, Ohio
- Coordinates: 41°13′39″N 82°45′27″W
- Architectural style: Gothic Revival
- NRHP reference No.: 93000896
- Added to NRHP: September 2, 1993

Hunts Corners (also Hunt's Corners or Moorehead) is an unincorporated community in southeastern Lyme Township, Huron County, Ohio, United States. It lies at the intersection of State Route 547 and Sand Hill Road, southeast of Bellevue and southwest of the city of Norwalk, the county seat of Huron County. Its elevation is 768 feet (234 m), and it is located at 41°13′39″N 82°45′27″W.

Hunts Corners is among Huron County's oldest communities. Founded by Levi Sutton, a Virginian, the community was established as the "Sutton Settlement" in 1811, six years before the first settlers arrived in Norwalk. While it was one of several small communities formed in Lyme Township during the early years of settlement, the area long languished: many of the earliest landowners were speculators who refused to sell land to would-be settlers, many of the remaining tracts were long embroiled in probate lawsuits, and the lower sale price of federally owned lands farther west retarded interest in the acreage of this township, given its location on the western edge of the Firelands. Although the township's first sawmill was built on Levi Sutton's property, later industry was concentrated in other parts of the township.

In 1993, Hunts Corners was listed on the National Register of Historic Places as a historic district, primarily because of its role in the exploration and settlement of the region. It is one of three districts on the National Register in Huron County, along with West Main Street in Norwalk and the county courthouse complex.
