= Ohio State Route 99 =

State highway in Huron and Erie Counties, Ohio, US

State Route 99

Route information
- Maintained by ODOT
- Length: 22.61 mi (36.39 km)
- Existed: 1923–present

Major junctions
- South end: US 224 in Willard
- US 20 / SR 18 in Monroeville
- North end: SR 4 / CR 42 near Sandusky

Location
- Country: United States
- State: Ohio
- Counties: Huron, Erie

Highway system
- Ohio State Highway System; Interstate; US; State; Scenic
← SR 98	→ SR 100

State Route 99 (SR 99) is a north–south state highway in the north-central portion of the U.S. state of Ohio. The highway's southern terminus is in the southern end of Willard at a T-intersection with U.S. Route 224 (US 224). Its northern terminus is at a roundabout junction with SR 4 about 6 miles (9.7 km) southwest of the city limits of Sandusky.

== Route description ==
Along its way, SR 99 runs through the western half of Huron County and the southwestern portion of Erie County. No segment of SR 99 is included within the National Highway System, a network of highways identified as being most important for the nation's economy, mobility and defense.

== History ==
SR 99 was designated in 1923. It was originally routed along its current alignment from its present southern terminus at US 224, at the time known as SR 17, to its junction with what is today the concurrency of US 20 and SR 18 in Monroeville, but in 1923 was a part of SR 2.

In 1937, the highway was extended north from Monroeville through its present northern terminus at SR 4, and then continuing northwest from there along Skadden Road, and north along Bardshar Road before coming to an end at its intersection with US 6 in the western end of Sandusky. By 1966, SR 99 was shortened to its present routing when the portions of the highway along Skadden Road and Bardshar Road north of SR 4 were removed from the state highway system, and jurisdiction of these roadways was turned over to Erie County.

== Major intersections ==
County	Location	mi	km	Destinations	Notes
Huron	Willard	0.00	0.00	US 224 (Walton Street) – Tiffin	
Huron	Willard	0.87	1.40	SR 103 (East Tiffin Street)	
Huron	Greenfield Township	4.49	7.23	SR 162 – Republic, North Fairfield	
Huron	Monroeville	14.43	23.22	SR 547 (Monroe Street)	
Huron	Monroeville	14.90	23.98	US 20 / SR 18 (Sandusky Street) – Norwalk, Bellevue	
Huron–Erie county line	Ridgefield–Oxford township line	17.88	28.78	SR 113 – Milan, Bellevue	
Erie	Groton Township	22.61	36.39	SR 4 / CR 42 (Skadden Road) – Sandusky, Bucyrus	
1.000 mi = 1.609 km; 1.000 km = 0.621 mi
