= Zion Episcopal Church (Monroeville, Ohio) =

- U.S. National Register of Historic Places
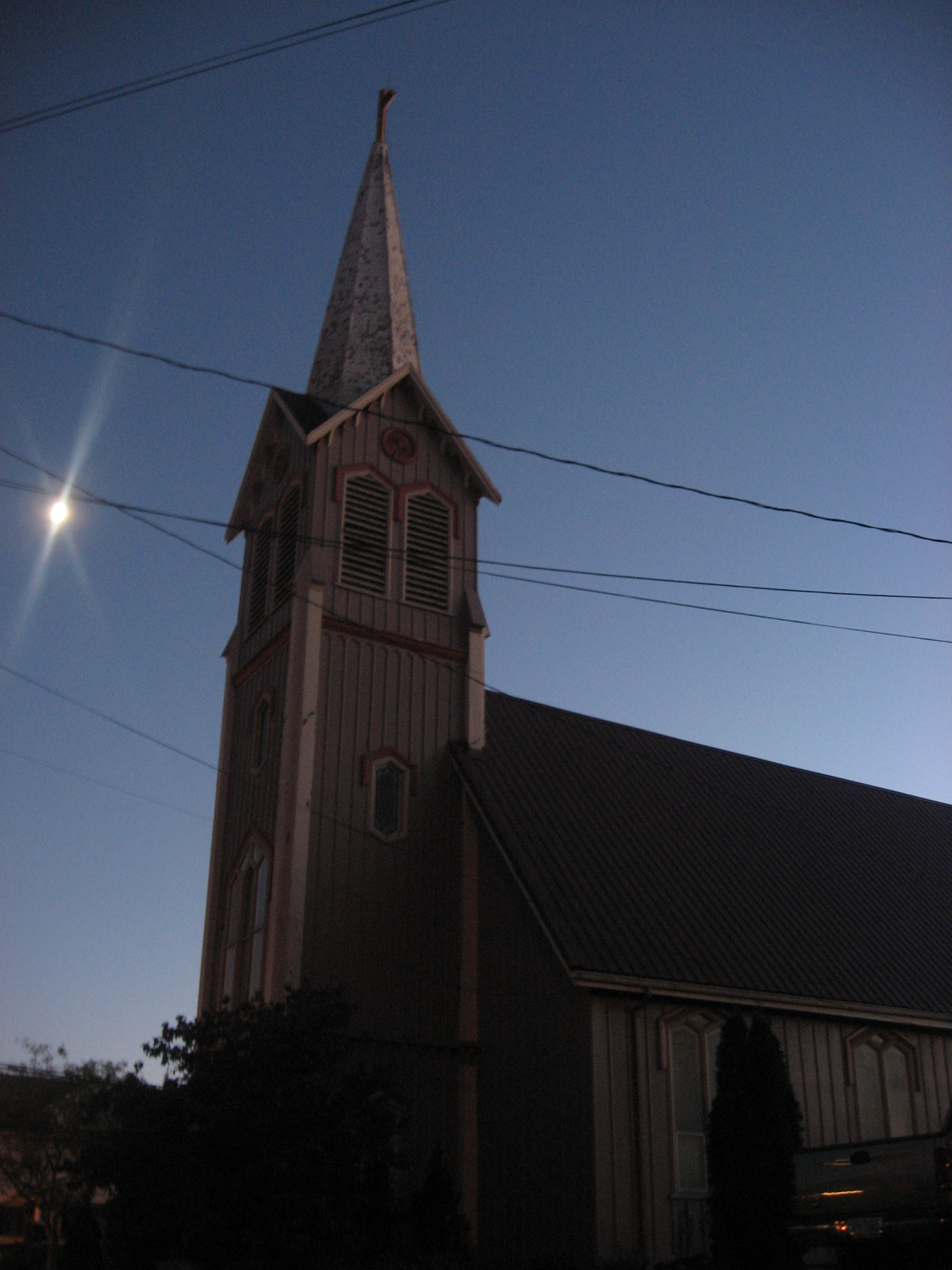
- Northern side and tower

- Location within Ohio Location within the United States
- Location: Ridge St. at Monroe St., Monroeville, Ohio
- Coordinates: 41°14′34.5″N 82°42′13″W
- Area: Less than 1 acre (0.40 ha)
- Built: 1861
- Architectural style: Carpenter Gothic
- NRHP reference No.: 74001533
- Added to NRHP: May 3, 1974

Zion Episcopal Church is a historic Protestant Episcopal parish in the village of Monroeville, Ohio, United States. Constructed in the 1860s in the regionally unusual Carpenter Gothic style, the church building has been named a historic site.

Monroeville was platted in 1817, one year after the arrival of the first settler, and the village was incorporated in 1868. Within the first few years, churches of the Baptist, Methodist, and Presbyterian faiths were organized. The village's first Episcopal families began meeting together in 1843, but eleven years passed before they were gathered into their own parish, and the present church building was not built until 1861.

Built with weatherboarded walls and covered with a shingled roof, Zion is a Carpenter Gothic structure. Its architectural style distinguishes it among rural mid-nineteenth-century churches in the Connecticut Western Reserve region of northeastern Ohio, many of which were Greek Revival buildings without the single tall tower so prominent in Zion's design. At the same time, Zion differs from the typical Carpenter Gothic church in its use of angled gable-shaped windows instead of the ogive traditional in Gothic Revival buildings. Worshippers enter the building though double doors in the base of the tower, above which are placed one large window and one small. A belfry with louvering occupies the highest level of the tower, above which stands a cross-tipped steeple. The roof rises steeply to front and rear gables, with a small section of the roof and much of the front gable being obscured by the tower.

On May 3, 1974, Zion Episcopal Church was listed on the National Register of Historic Places, qualifying because of its historically significant architecture. On the same day, the same designation was granted to two other Monroeville locations, the Seth Brown House and the John Hosford House.
