= Ridgefield Township, Huron County, Ohio =

Township in Ohio, US

- Township
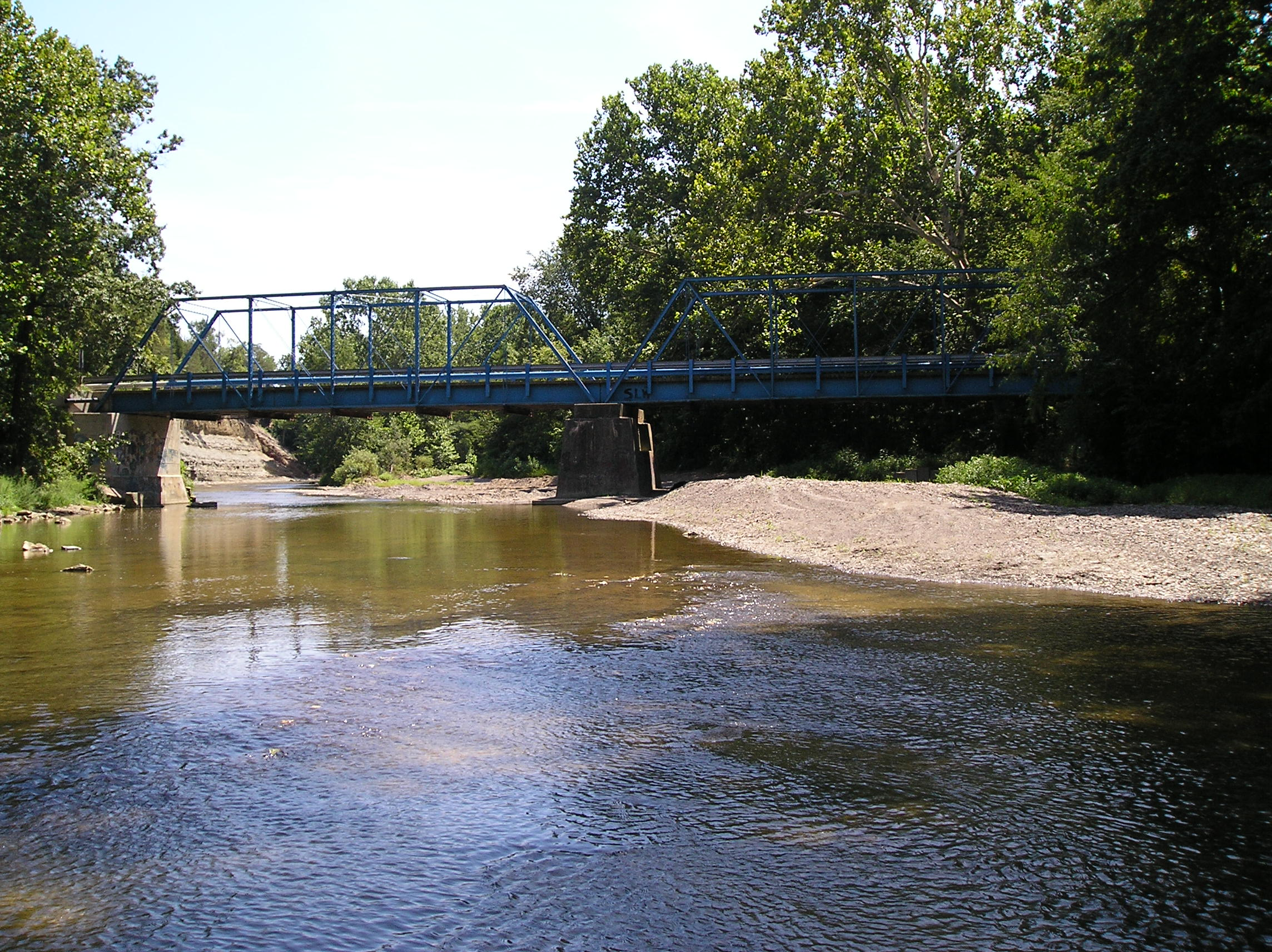
- Blue Bridge, which spans the Huron River

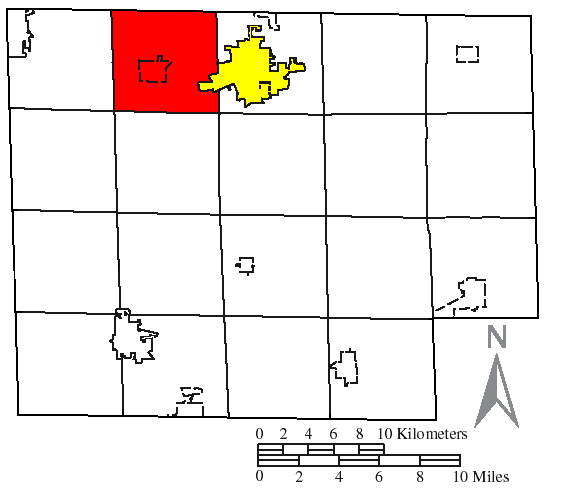
- Location of Ridgefield Township (red) in Huron County, next to the city of Norwalk (yellow)
- Coordinates: 41°14′51″N 82°41′20″W
- Country: United States
- State: Ohio
- County: Huron

Area
  - Total: 25.6 sq mi (66.4 km^{2})
  - Land: 25.5 sq mi (66.0 km^{2})
  - Water: 0.15 sq mi (0.4 km^{2})
- Elevation: 712 ft (217 m)

Population (2020)
  - Total: 2,197
  - Density: 86.2/sq mi (33.3/km^{2})
- Time zone: UTC-5 (Eastern (EST))
  - Summer (DST): UTC-4 (EDT)
- ZIP code: 44847
- Area code: 419
- FIPS code: 39-67006
- GNIS feature ID: 1086357
- Website: http://www.ridgefieldtownship.com/

Ridgefield Township is one of the nineteen townships of Huron County, Ohio, United States. As of the 2020 census the population was 2,197.

== Geography ==
Located on the northern edge of the county, it borders the following townships:

- Oxford Township, Erie County - north
- Milan Township, Erie County - northeast corner
- Norwalk Township - east
- Bronson Township - southeast corner
- Peru Township - south
- Sherman Township - southwest corner
- Lyme Township - west
- Groton Township, Erie County - northwest corner

The Village of Monroeville is located approximately in the center of the township. A portion of the City of Norwalk, the county seat of Huron County, is presently located within the eastern boundary of the township due to annexation of the Sycamore Hills development.

== Name and history ==
Ridgefield Township was organized in 1815.

It is the only Ridgefield Township statewide.

== Government ==
The township is governed by a three-member board of trustees, who are elected in November of odd-numbered years to a four-year term beginning on the following January 1. Two are elected in the year after the presidential election and one is elected in the year before it. There is also an elected township fiscal officer, who serves a four-year term beginning on April 1 of the year after the election, which is held in November of the year before the presidential election. Vacancies in the fiscal officership or on the board of trustees are filled by the remaining trustees.

== Transportation ==
Due to the lay of the land and early settlement routes, the roads in this township follow no particular pattern. Important highways include U.S. Route 20 and State Routes 18, 61, 99, 113, and 547.

East-west roads

- County Line Road
- Everingin Road
- Field Road
- Hill Road
- Jacobs Road
- Lamereaux Road
- Mead Road
- Norwalk Street
- Old West Main Street
- Ruggles Road
- Schaffer Road
- South Norwalk Road
- Standardsburg Road
- State Route 18
- State Route 113
- State Route 547
- U.S. Route 20
- Washington Road
- Webb Settlement

North-south Roads

- Brown Road
- Drake Road
- Farr Road
- Fritz Road
- Halfway Road
- Hettle Road
- Huber Road
- Limbird Road
- Lover's Lane Road
- Peru Center Road
- River Road
- Section Line Road 117
- State Route 61
- State Route 99
- Townline Road 32
- Williams Road
