= Lyme Township, Huron County, Ohio =

Township in Ohio, US

- Township
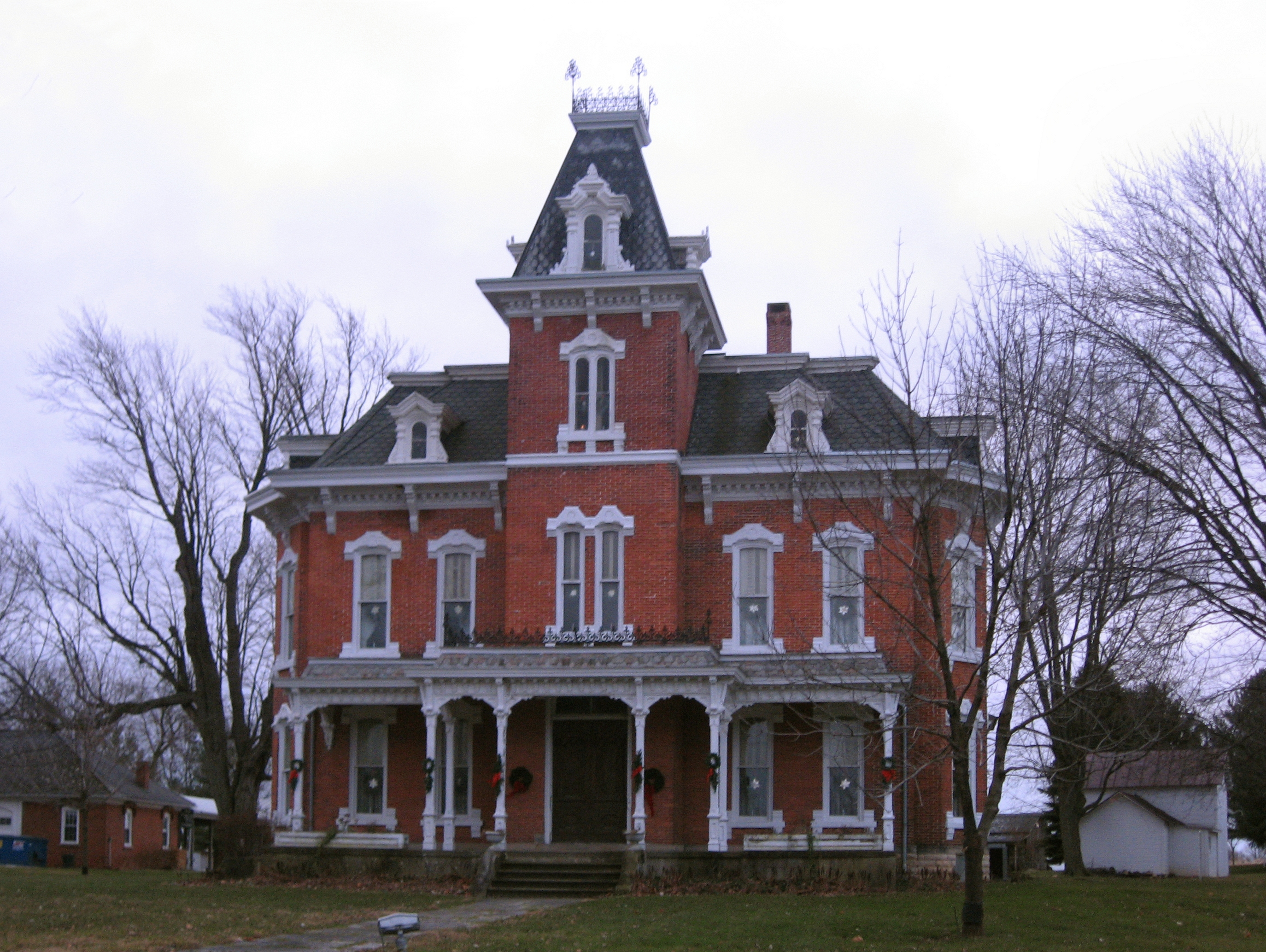
- The John Wright Mansion, a historic site in the township

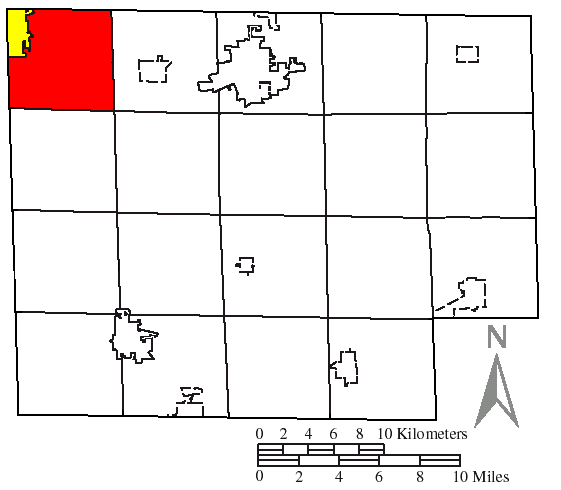
- Location of Lyme Township (red) in Huron County, next to the city of Bellevue (yellow)
- Coordinates: 41°15′12″N 82°47′20″W
- Country: United States
- State: Ohio
- County: Huron

Area
  - Total: 22.83 sq mi (59.14 km^{2})
  - Land: 22.77 sq mi (58.98 km^{2})
  - Water: 0.062 sq mi (0.16 km^{2})
- Elevation: 784 ft (239 m)

Population (2020)
  - Total: 873
  - Density: 38.3/sq mi (14.8/km^{2})
- Time zone: UTC-5 (Eastern (EST))
  - Summer (DST): UTC-4 (EDT)
- FIPS code: 39-45514
- GNIS feature ID: 1086349
- Website: lymetownship.com

Lyme Township is one of the nineteen townships of Huron County, Ohio, United States. As of the 2020 census the population of the township was 873.

== Geography ==
Located in the northwestern corner of the county, it borders the following townships:

- Groton Township, Erie County - north
- Oxford Township, Erie County - northeast corner
- Ridgefield Township - east
- Peru Township - southeast corner
- Sherman Township - south
- Thompson Township, Seneca County - southwest
- York Township, Sandusky County - northwest

It is the only township in the county to border Sandusky County.

The city of Bellevue borders the northwestern portion of Lyme Township, and the unincorporated community of Hunts Corners lies in the township's southeastern corner.

== Name and history ==
It is the only Lyme Township statewide.

Settlement of Lyme Township began in 1808. Three years later, the "Sutton Settlement" (now Hunts Corners) was established in the southeastern portion of the county.

=== National Register of Historic Places ===
The John Wright Mansion, located on State Route 113, was listed on the National Register of Historic Places on February 27, 1974. In 1993, the entirety of Hunts Corners was listed on the Register as a historic district.

== Government ==
The township is governed by a three-member board of trustees, who are elected in November of odd-numbered years to a four-year term beginning on the following January 1. Two are elected in the year after the presidential election and one is elected in the year before it. There is also an elected township fiscal officer, who serves a four-year term beginning on April 1 of the year after the election, which is held in November of the year before the presidential election. Vacancies in the fiscal officership or on the board of trustees are filled by the remaining trustees. In 2009, the board was composed of Roger Hunker, David Lepley, and Michael C. Nottke, and the fiscal officer was Deborah Hawkins.
