= Gregory House (New London, Ohio) =

- U.S. National Register of Historic Places
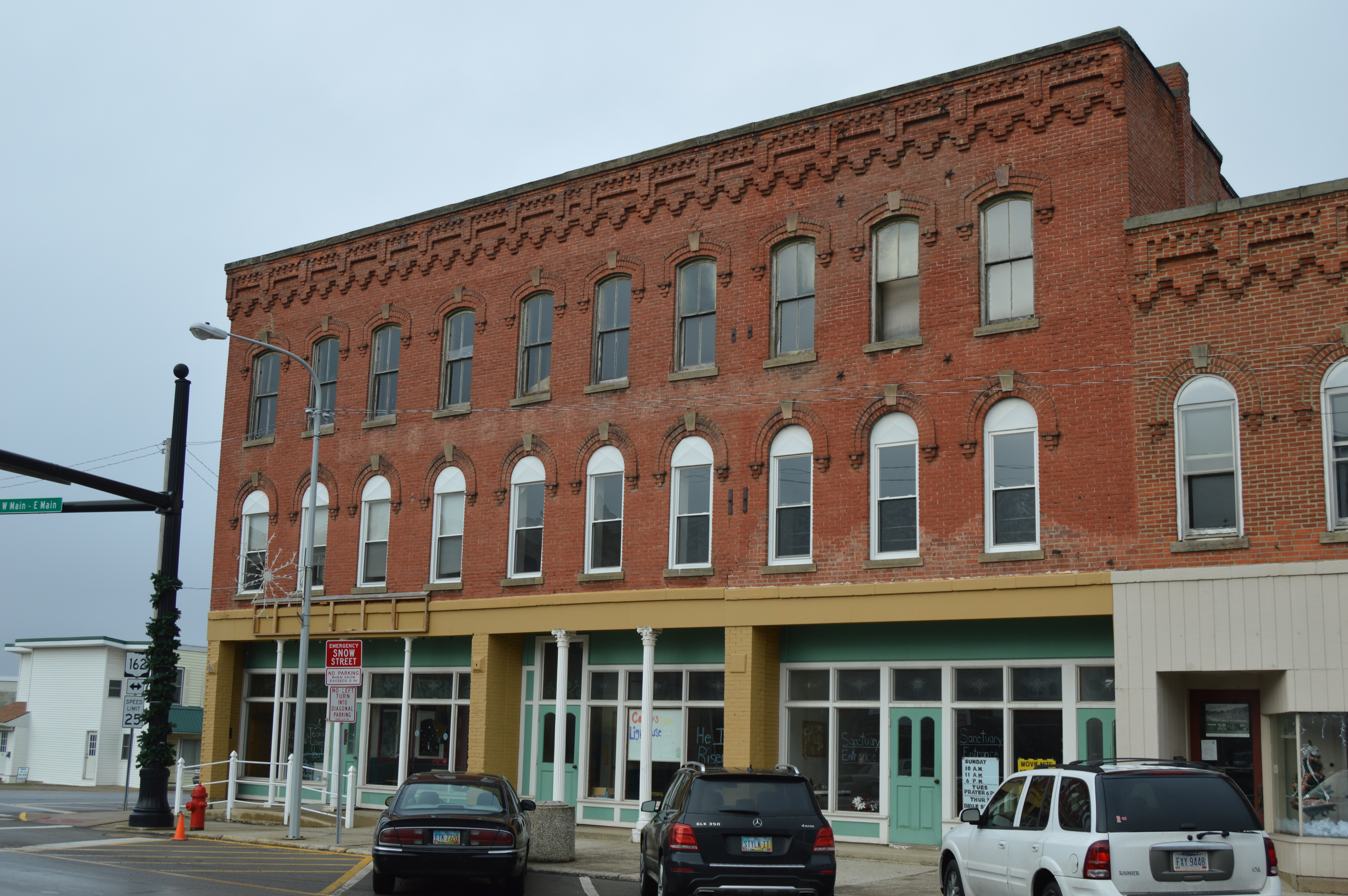
- Front, seen from the east

- Location within Ohio Location within the United States
- Location: 1 E. Main St., New London, Ohio
- Coordinates: 41°5′6″N 82°23′53″W
- Area: Less than 1 acre (0.40 ha)
- Built: 1873
- Architect: Albert A. Powers
- NRHP reference No.: 84003746
- Added to NRHP: February 24, 1984

The Gregory House is a historic hotel in central New London, Ohio, United States. Erected soon after a fire that devastated the community, it has occupied a significant place in the community since its construction, and it has been named a historic site.

John Corey built the first cabin in present-day New London in 1816, and within a few years he was joined by several additional families. The village was incorporated in 1853 and grew rapidly, but its growth was checked by two major fires; the latter, which occurred on 17 November 1872, destroyed more than forty thousand dollars of property. One year later, village blacksmith Charles Gregory erected his namesake hotel, two-thirds for himself and one-third for local lawyer Albert Porter. Its height was taller than that of other Main Street buildings in the community.

Like many Ohio small-town hotels constructed in the years after the Civil War, the Gregory House was built of local materials and typifies the commercial vernacular architecture of the Firelands. Three stories tall with an irregular floor plan, the brick hotel rests on a stone foundation, and sandstone is employed for the coping, the lintels, and the keystones. In its earliest years, the hotel possessed a ten-bay facade with arched windows, topped with corbelling that formed a simple cornice, and display windows filled the first story.

In 1984, the Gregory House was listed on the National Register of Historic Places, qualifying both because of its historically significant architecture and because of its important rôle in local history. It is one of seventeen Huron County locations on the Register, although the only one in New London.
