= Norwich Township, Huron County, Ohio =

Township in Ohio, US

- Township
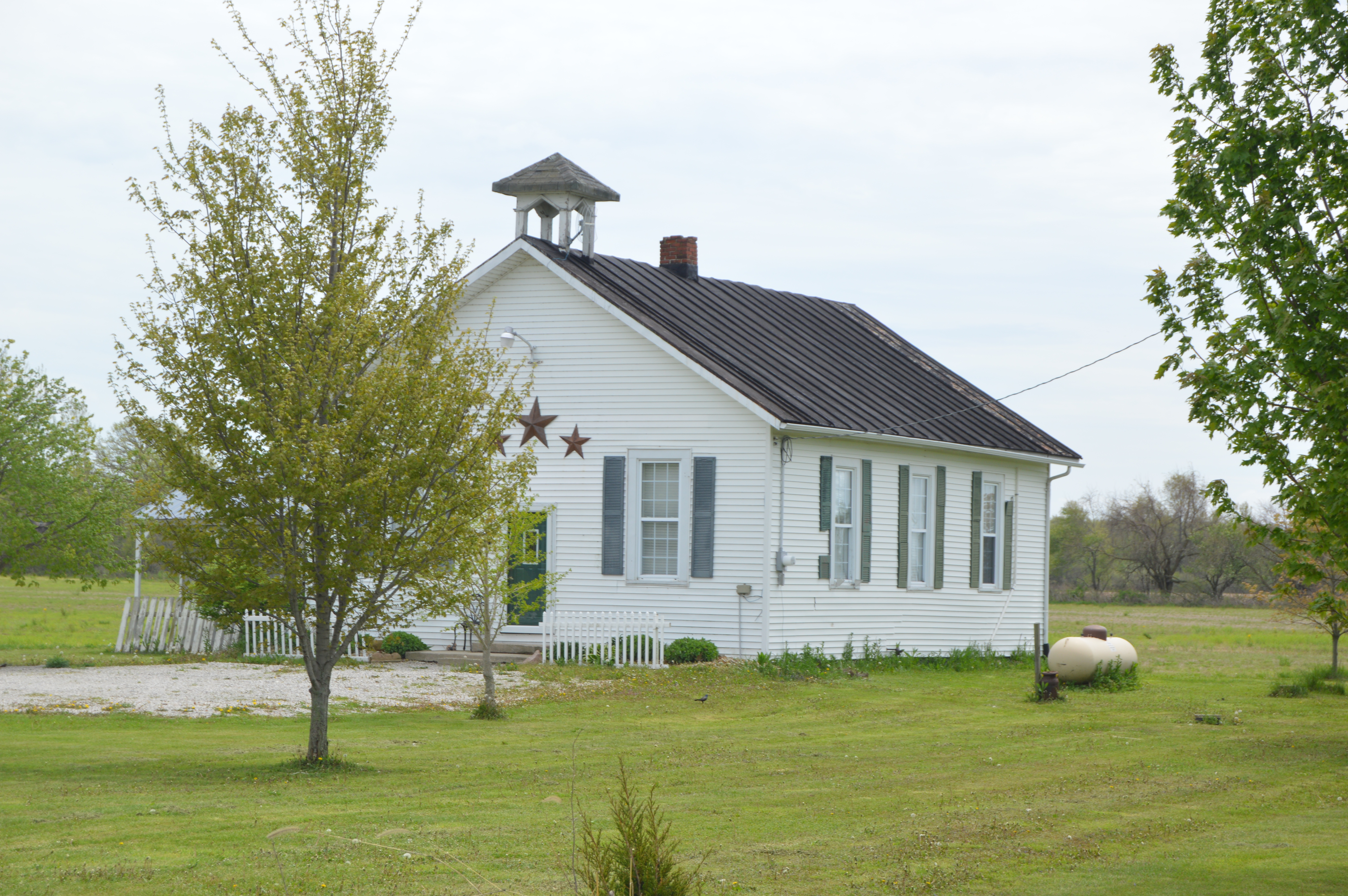
- Former schoolhouse at Havana

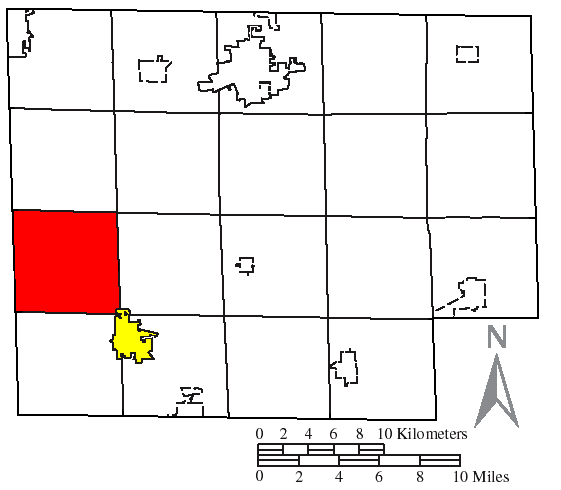
- Location of Norwich Township (red) in Huron County, next to the city of Willard (yellow)
- Coordinates: 41°6′17″N 82°46′54″W
- Country: United States
- State: Ohio
- County: Huron

Area
  - Total: 25.9 sq mi (67.2 km^{2})
  - Land: 25.9 sq mi (67.0 km^{2})
  - Water: 0.077 sq mi (0.2 km^{2})
- Elevation: 846 ft (258 m)

Population (2020)
  - Total: 1,022
  - Density: 39.5/sq mi (15.3/km^{2})
- Time zone: UTC-5 (Eastern (EST))
  - Summer (DST): UTC-4 (EDT)
- FIPS code: 39-57358
- GNIS feature ID: 1086354

Norwich Township is one of the nineteen townships of Huron County, Ohio, United States. As of the 2020 census the population of the township was 1,022.

== Geography ==
Located on the western edge of the county, it borders the following townships:

- Sherman Township - north
- Peru Township - northeast corner
- Greenfield Township - east
- New Haven Township - southeast corner
- Richmond Township - south
- Venice Township, Seneca County - southwest
- Reed Township, Seneca County - west

A small part of the city of Willard borders the southeast corner of Norwich Township, and part of the census-designated place of Holiday Lakes is located within the township.

== Name and history ==
Norwich Township was organized in 1827. It was named after Norwich, Connecticut. Statewide, the only other Norwich Township is located in Franklin County.

== Government ==
The township is governed by a three-member board of trustees, who are elected in November of odd-numbered years to a four-year term beginning on the following January 1. Two are elected in the year after the presidential election and one is elected in the year before it. There is also an elected township fiscal officer, who serves a four-year term beginning on April 1 of the year after the election, which is held in November of the year before the presidential election. Vacancies in the fiscal officership or on the board of trustees are filled by the remaining trustees.
