= Celeryville, Ohio =

- Census-designated place
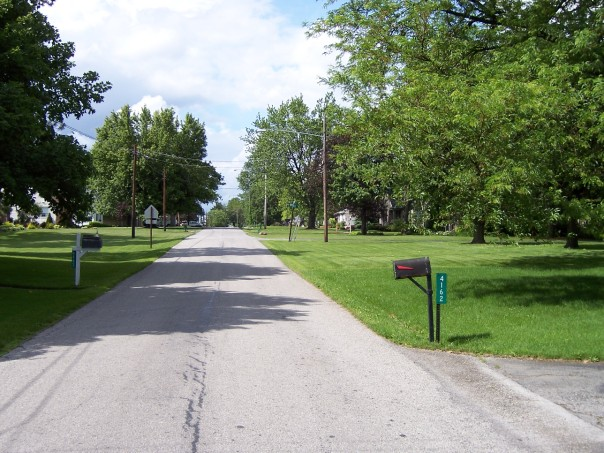
- Broadway Road in Celeryville

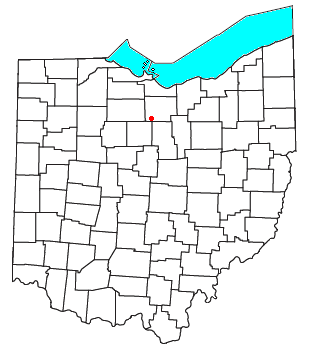
- Location in Ohio
- Coordinates: 41°01′43″N 82°43′38″W
- Country: United States
- State: Ohio
- County: Huron
- Townships: New Haven, Richmond

Area
  - Total: 0.52 sq mi (1.34 km^{2})
  - Land: 0.52 sq mi (1.34 km^{2})
  - Water: 0 sq mi (0.00 km^{2})
- Elevation: 925 ft (282 m)

Population (2020)
  - Total: 222
  - Density: 429.9/sq mi (165.98/km^{2})
- Time zone: UTC-5 (Eastern (EST))
  - Summer (DST): UTC-4 (EDT)
- ZIP code: 44890
- Area code: 419
- FIPS code: 39-12854
- GNIS feature ID: 2628874

Celeryville is an unincorporated community and census-designated place (CDP) on the boundary between New Haven and Richmond townships in Huron County, Ohio, United States. Celeryville is located approximately 1 mile (1.6 km) south of Willard, and the community relies on Willard's social services. As of the 2020 census the population of the community was 222.

== History ==
Celeryville was originally settled chiefly by Dutch immigrants; the village was named for the celery farms near the original town site.

== Geography ==
Celeryville is located in southwestern Huron County. The center of the community is on the border of New Haven Township and Richmond Township. State Route 103, following the township border, is the main road through the community, leading north 2 miles (3 km) to the center of Willard and southwest 11 miles (18 km) to New Washington. Bullhead Road forms the northern edge of Celeryville, leading east 2.5 miles (4.0 km) to New Haven.

According to the U.S. Census Bureau, the Celeryville CDP has an area of 0.52 square miles (1.34 km^{2}), all of it land.

Celeryville is a unique agricultural community. The soil of farmlands is muck. It is so rich that in 1897 it caught fire. Farmers are able to grow vegetables much faster than other areas and can get one or two extra crops in a growing season. Ohio State University maintains an agricultural extension there.

== Demographics ==
Historical population
Census	Pop.	Note	%±
2020	222		—
U.S. Decennial Census

== Education ==
The Willard Area School District serves residents of Celeryville. The community is also the home of Celeryville Christian School, a pre-K-8 school.
