= John Hosford House =

- U.S. National Register of Historic Places
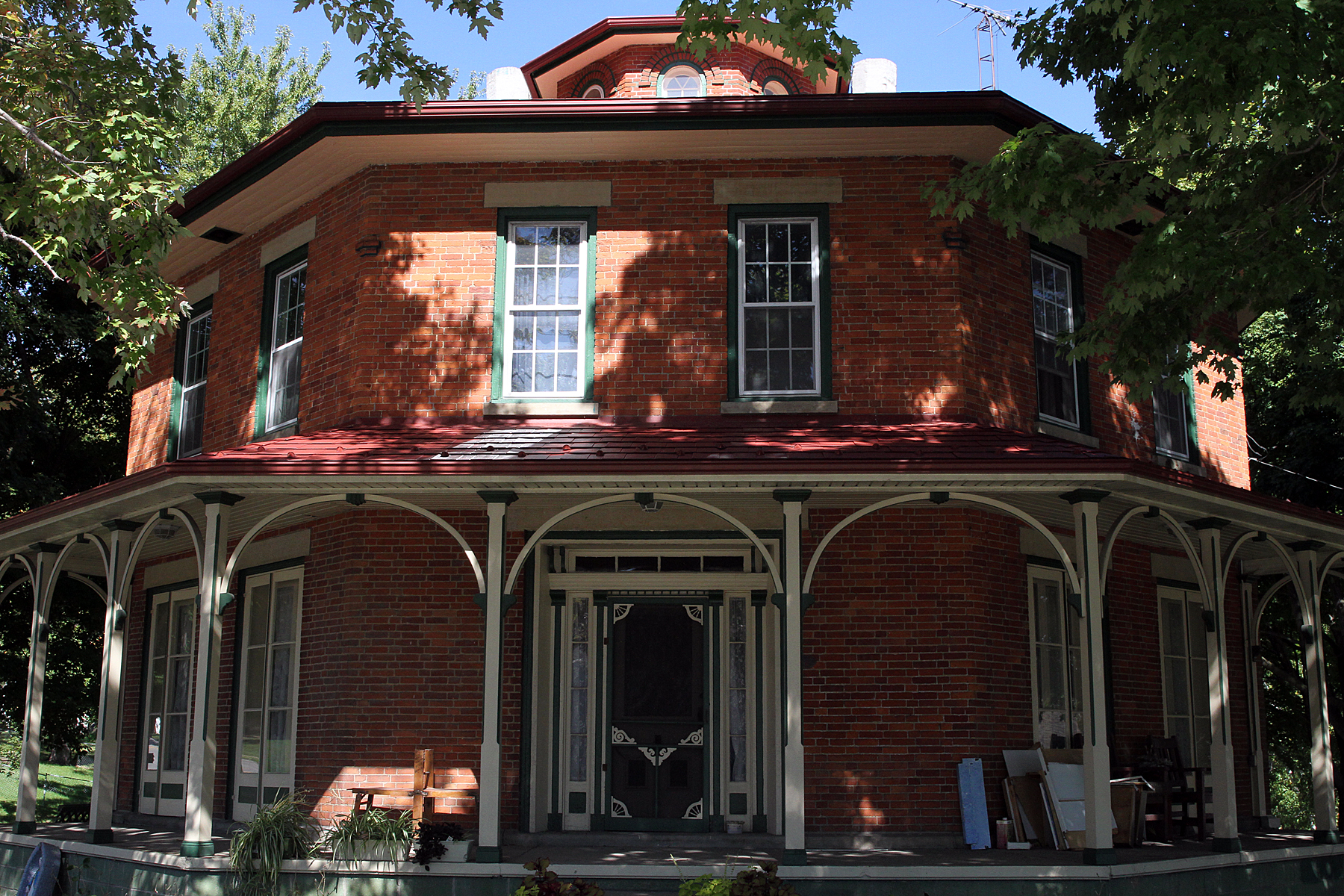
- Closeup showing part of the porch

- Location within Ohio Location within the United States
- Location: 64 Sandusky Street, Monroeville, Ohio
- Coordinates: 41°14′45″N 82°41′46″W
- Area: Less than 1 acre (0.40 ha)
- Built: 1860
- Architectural style: Octagon Mode, Italian Villa
- NRHP reference No.: 74001532
- Added to NRHP: May 3, 1974

The John Hosford House is a historic octagon house located along U.S. Route 20 in Monroeville, Ohio, United States. Built at an unknown point in the mid-nineteenth century, it has been named a historic site.

Monroeville's first settlers arrived in 1816, and the village was platted in the following year, but incorporation was achieved only in 1868. During the years of slow growth, merchant John Hosford settled in the community, and he accumulated enough wealth to erect a fanning mill in the village in 1870. By this time, he had built his house in a style popular for only a short while, the octagon mode; its precise date of construction is uncertain, with traditional accounts specifying 1856 and later studies suggesting 1862.

Hosford's house is a brick structure with ancillary elements of concrete. A true octagon, it features two windows on each side; a veranda adorns the sides facing the street, and a belvedere crowns the roof. The overall design mixes architectural styles; Greek Revival influence is clear in the construction of the main entrance, but the rest of the house is dominated by the Italianate style, including the arches and braces that lend the veranda the appearance of an arcade. Inside, each floor consists of five chambers: a spiral staircase at the center, surrounded by four rectangular rooms.

In May 1974, the John Hosford House was listed on the National Register of Historic Places, qualifying based on its historically significant architecture. It was added to the Register little more than two months after Huron County's first such locations, the John Wright Mansion near Bellevue and the West Main Street Historic District in Norwalk. Two other buildings in Monroeville, the Seth Brown House and Zion Episcopal Church, were listed on the Register on the same day and the Hosford House.
