= Fairfield Township, Huron County, Ohio =

Township in Ohio, US

- Township
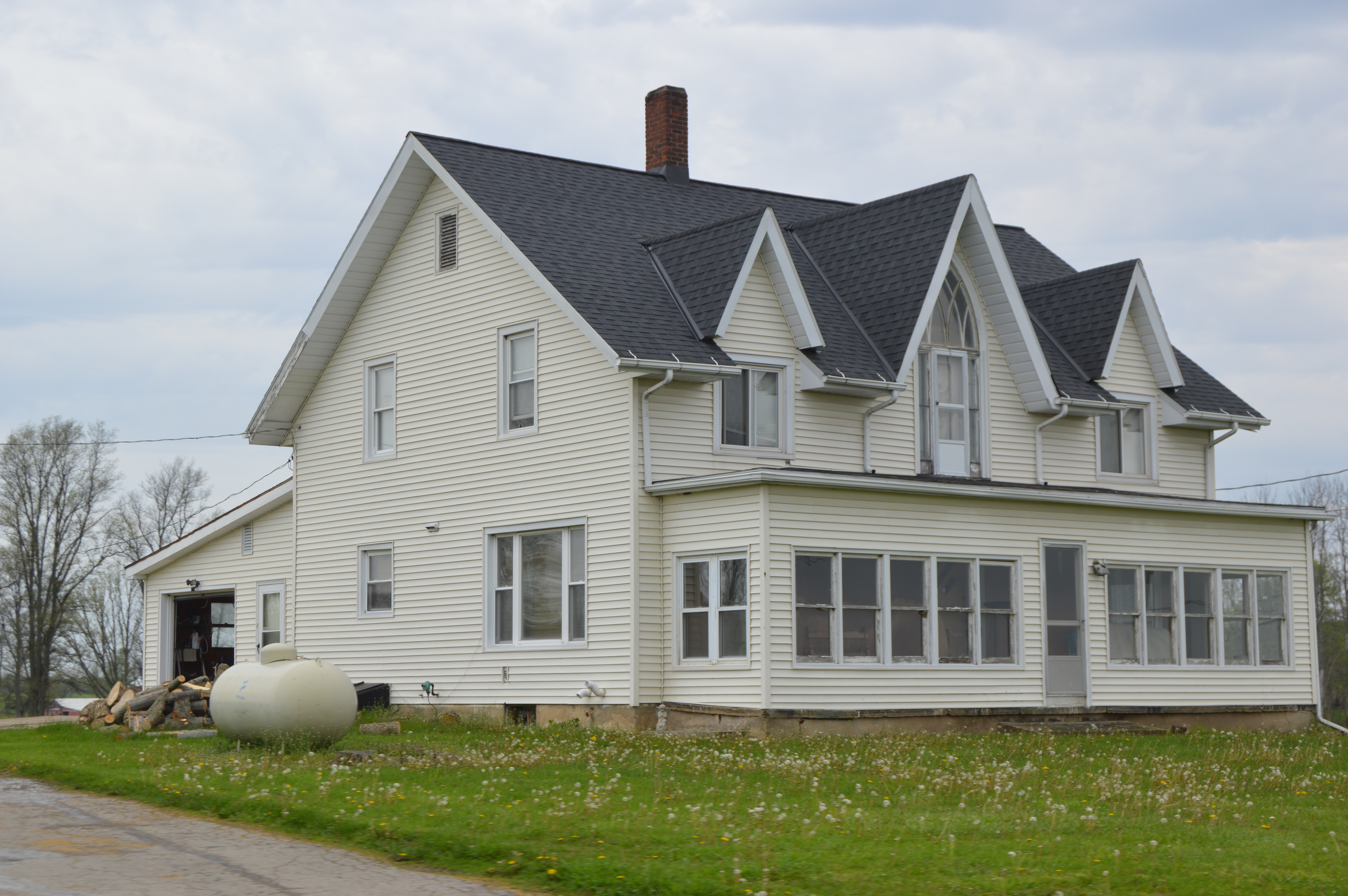
- Carpenter Gothic house south of North Fairfield

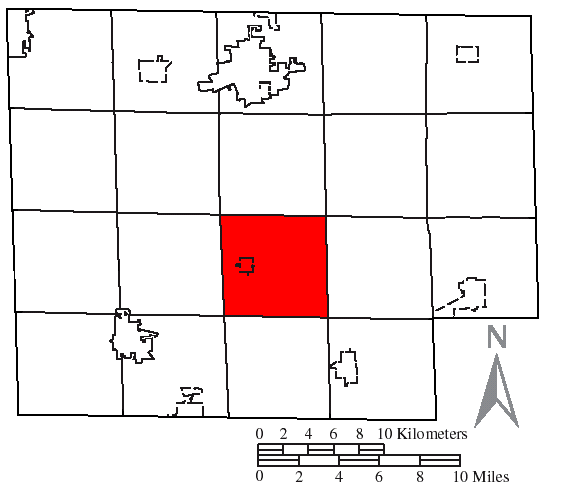
- Location of Fairfield Township in Huron County
- Coordinates: 41°6′10″N 82°35′43″W
- Country: United States
- State: Ohio
- County: Huron

Area
  - Total: 26.0 sq mi (67.3 km^{2})
  - Land: 25.9 sq mi (67.1 km^{2})
  - Water: 0.077 sq mi (0.2 km^{2})
- Elevation: 958 ft (292 m)

Population (2020)
  - Total: 1,124
  - Density: 43.4/sq mi (16.8/km^{2})
- Time zone: UTC-5 (Eastern (EST))
  - Summer (DST): UTC-4 (EDT)
- FIPS code: 39-26040
- GNIS feature ID: 1086344

Fairfield Township is one of the nineteen townships of Huron County, Ohio, United States. As of the 2020 census the population of the township was 1,124.

== Geography ==
Located in the center of the county, it borders the following townships:

- Norwalk Township - north
- Townsend Township - northeast corner
- Hartland Township - east
- Fitchville Township - southeast corner
- Ripley Township - south
- Greenfield Township - southwest corner
- Peru Township - west
- Ridgefield Township - northwest corner

The village of North Fairfield is located in western Fairfield Township.

== Name and history ==
Fairfield Township was organized in 1823. It was named after Fairfield, Connecticut, the hometown of many of its pioneer settlers.

It is one of seven Fairfield Townships statewide.

== Government ==
The township is governed by a three-member board of trustees, who are elected in November of odd-numbered years to a four-year term beginning on the following January 1. Two are elected in the year after the presidential election and one is elected in the year before it. There is also an elected township fiscal officer, who serves a four-year term beginning on April 1 of the year after the election, which is held in November of the year before the presidential election. Vacancies in the fiscal officership or on the board of trustees are filled by the remaining trustees.
