= Richmond Township, Huron County, Ohio =

Township in Ohio, US

- Township
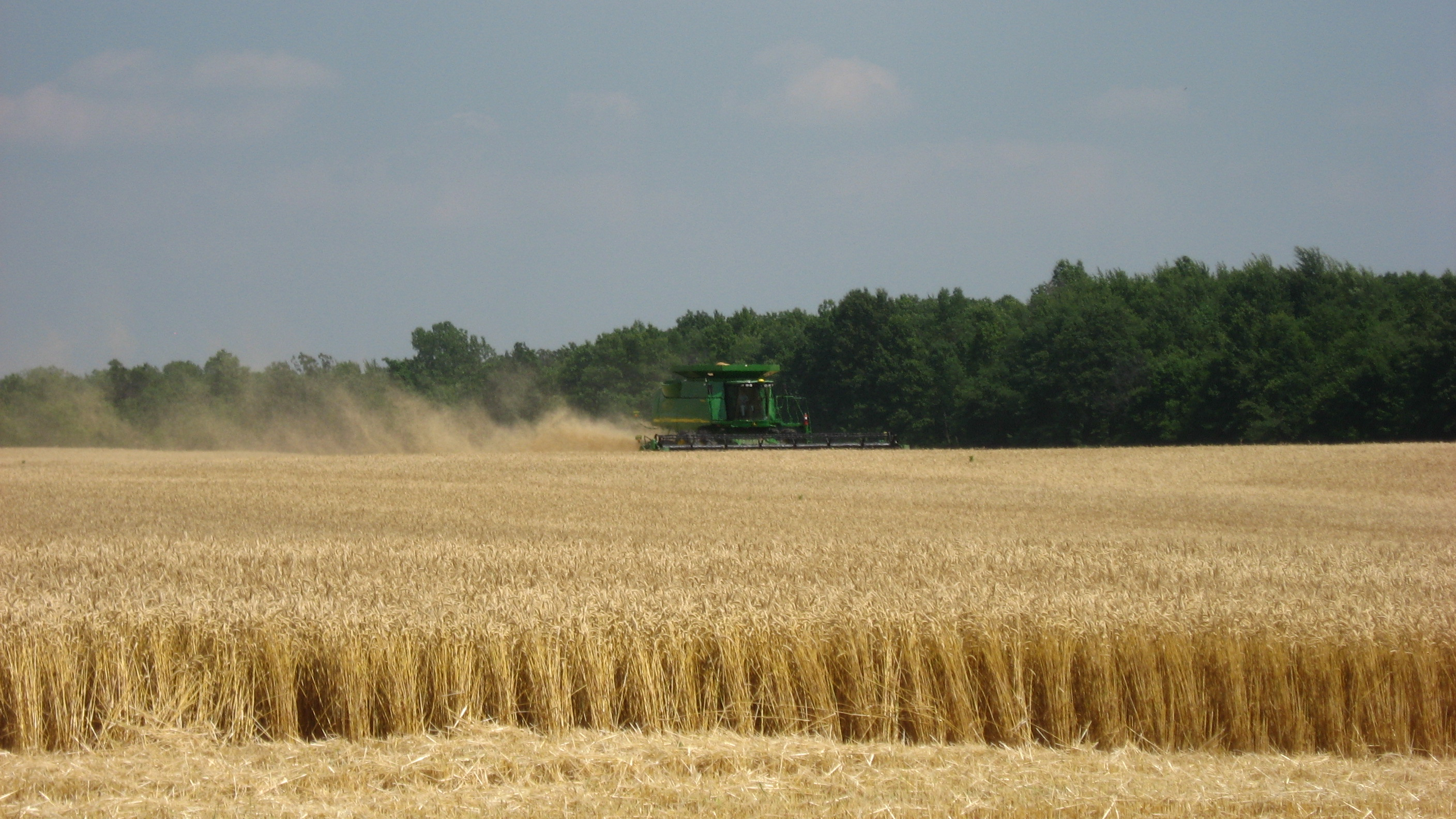
- Wheat harvest in Richmond Township

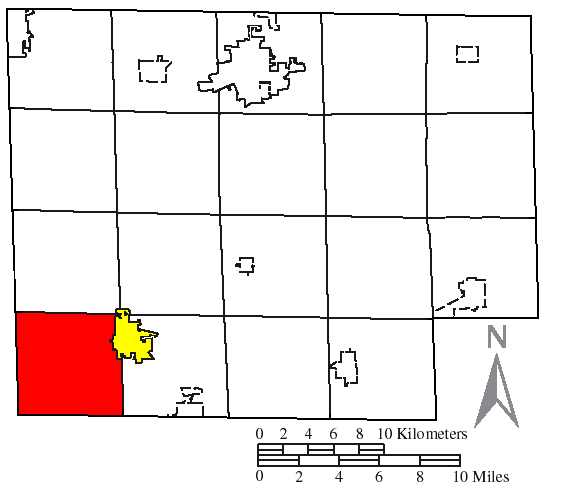
- Location of Richmond Township (red) in Huron County, next to the city of Willard (yellow)
- Coordinates: 41°2′19″N 82°46′24″W
- Country: United States
- State: Ohio
- County: Huron

Area
  - Total: 25.6 sq mi (66.4 km^{2})
  - Land: 25.5 sq mi (66.0 km^{2})
  - Water: 0.15 sq mi (0.4 km^{2})
- Elevation: 928 ft (283 m)

Population (2020)
  - Total: 985
  - Density: 38.7/sq mi (14.9/km^{2})
- Time zone: UTC-5 (Eastern (EST))
  - Summer (DST): UTC-4 (EDT)
- FIPS code: 39-66810
- GNIS feature ID: 1086356

Richmond Township is one of the nineteen townships of Huron County, Ohio, United States. As of the 2020 census the population of the township was 985.

== Geography ==
Located in the southwestern corner of the county, it borders the following townships:

- Norwich Township - north
- Greenfield Township - northeast corner
- New Haven Township - east
- Auburn Township, Crawford County - south
- Cranberry Township, Crawford County - southwest
- Venice Township, Seneca County - west

Richmond Township includes almost all of the county's border with Crawford County.

The city of Willard borders the northeastern side of Richmond Township, and the census-designated place of Celeryville lies on the township's northeastern border with New Haven Township.

== Name and history ==
Statewide, the only other Richmond Township is located in Ashtabula County.

Richmond Township was organized in 1836.

== Government ==
The township is governed by a three-member board of trustees, who are elected in November of odd-numbered years to a four-year term beginning on the following January 1. Two are elected in the year after the presidential election and one is elected in the year before it. There is also an elected township fiscal officer, who serves a four-year term beginning on April 1 of the year after the election, which is held in November of the year before the presidential election. Vacancies in the fiscal officership or on the board of trustees are filled by the remaining trustees.
