= Sherman Township, Huron County, Ohio =

Township in Ohio, US

- Township
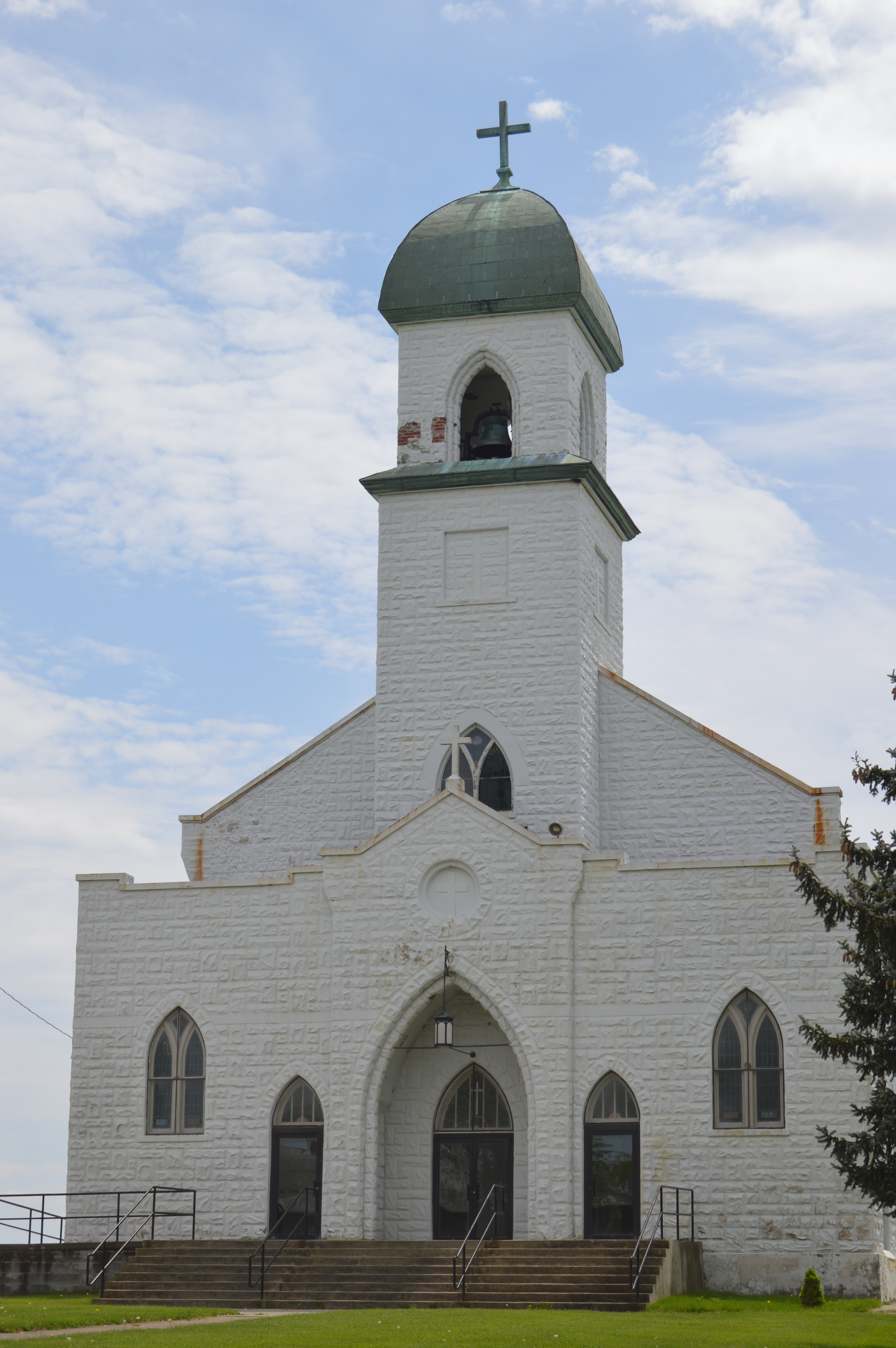
- St. Sebastian's Catholic Church at Bismarck

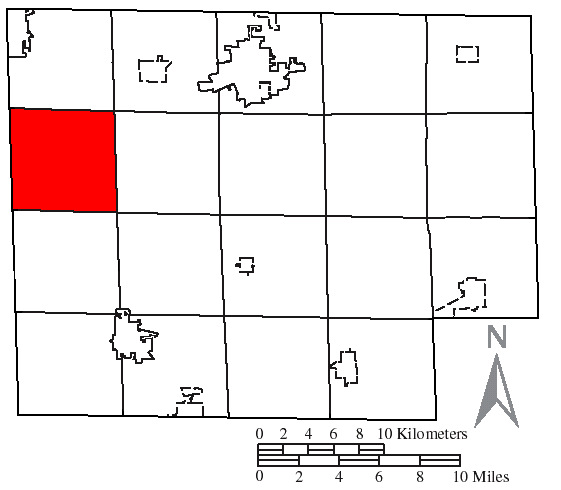
- Location of Sherman Township in Huron County
- Coordinates: 41°11′1″N 82°46′49″W
- Country: United States
- State: Ohio
- County: Huron

Area
  - Total: 26.0 sq mi (67.3 km^{2})
  - Land: 25.9 sq mi (67.0 km^{2})
  - Water: 0.12 sq mi (0.3 km^{2})
- Elevation: 801 ft (244 m)

Population (2020)
  - Total: 519
  - Density: 20.1/sq mi (7.75/km^{2})
- Time zone: UTC-5 (Eastern (EST))
  - Summer (DST): UTC-4 (EDT)
- FIPS code: 39-72193
- GNIS feature ID: 1086359
- Website: http://www.shermantownshipoh.com/

Sherman Township is one of the nineteen townships of Huron County, Ohio, United States. As of the 2020 census the population of the township was 519.

== Geography ==
Located on the western edge of the county, it borders the following townships:

- Lyme Township - north
- Ridgefield Township - northeast corner
- Peru Township - east
- Greenfield Township - southeast corner
- Norwich Township - south
- Reed Township, Seneca County - southwest
- Thompson Township, Seneca County - northwest

No municipalities are located in Sherman Township.

== Name and history ==
Sherman Township was named for Taylor Sherman, a director of the Firelands company.

It is the only Sherman Township statewide.

== Government ==
The township is governed by a three-member board of trustees, who are elected in November of odd-numbered years to a four-year term beginning on the following January 1. Two are elected in the year after the presidential election and one is elected in the year before it. There is also an elected township fiscal officer, who serves a four-year term beginning on April 1 of the year after the election, which is held in November of the year before the presidential election. Vacancies in the fiscal officership or on the board of trustees are filled by the remaining trustees.
