= Peru Township, Huron County, Ohio =

Township in Ohio, US

- Township
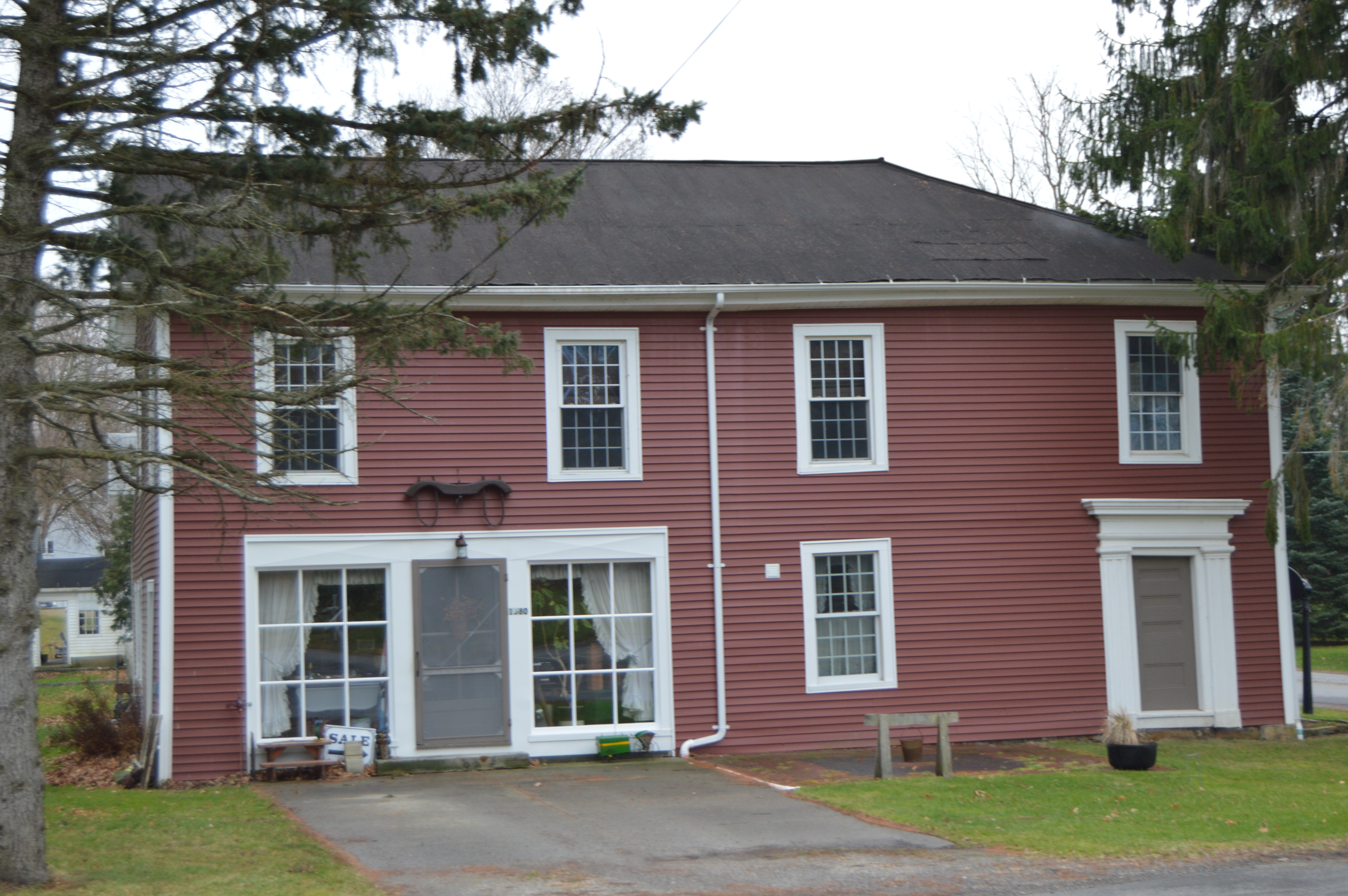
- The Macksville Tavern on Peru Hollow Road

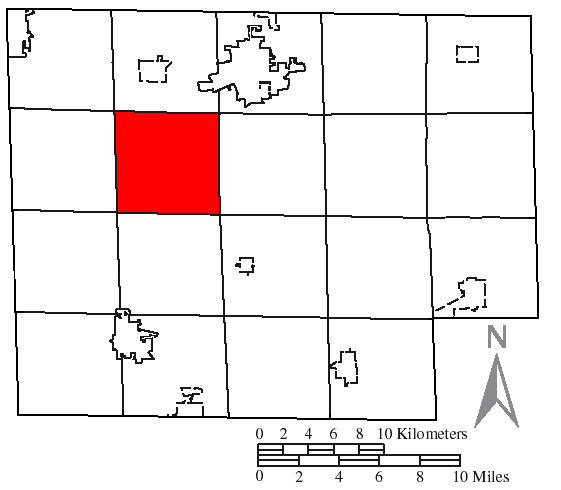
- Location of Peru Township in Huron County
- Coordinates: 41°10′45″N 82°41′29″W
- Country: United States
- State: Ohio
- County: Huron

Area
  - Total: 25.7 sq mi (66.6 km^{2})
  - Land: 25.6 sq mi (66.4 km^{2})
  - Water: 0.077 sq mi (0.2 km^{2})
- Elevation: 768 ft (234 m)

Population (2020)
  - Total: 1,054
  - Density: 41.1/sq mi (15.9/km^{2})
- Time zone: UTC-5 (Eastern (EST))
  - Summer (DST): UTC-4 (EDT)
- FIPS code: 39-62246
- GNIS feature ID: 1086355

Peru Township is one of the nineteen townships of Huron County, Ohio, United States. As of the 2020 census the population of the township was 1,054.

== Geography ==
Located in the western part of the county, it borders the following townships:

- Ridgefield Township - north
- Norwalk Township - northeast corner
- Bronson Township - east
- Fairfield Township - southeast corner
- Greenfield Township - south
- Norwich Township - southwest corner
- Sherman Township - west
- Lyme Township - northwest corner

No municipalities are located in Peru Township.

== Name and history ==
Statewide, the only other Peru Township is located in Morrow County.

== Government ==
The township is governed by a three-member board of trustees, who are elected in November of odd-numbered years to a four-year term beginning on the following January 1. Two are elected in the year after the presidential election and one is elected in the year before it. There is also an elected township fiscal officer, who serves a four-year term beginning on April 1 of the year after the election, which is held in November of the year before the presidential election. Vacancies in the fiscal officership or on the board of trustees are filled by the remaining trustees.
