= Ohio State Route 547 =

State highway in Huron County, Ohio, US

State Route 547

Route information
- Maintained by ODOT
- Length: 8.18 mi (13.16 km)
- Existed: 1937–present

Major junctions
- West end: SR 269 near Bellevue
- East end: US 20 / SR 18 in Monroeville

Location
- Country: United States
- State: Ohio
- Counties: Huron

Highway system
- Ohio State Highway System; Interstate; US; State; Scenic
← SR 546	→ SR 548

State Route 547 (SR 547) is an east–west state highway in north central Ohio, a U.S. state. The highway's western terminus is at SR 269 approximately four and a half miles (7.2 km) south of Bellevue. The eastern terminus of SR 547 is at the concurrency of U.S. Route 20 (US 20) and SR 18 in downtown Monroeville.

Located in western Huron County, State Route 547 traverses primarily rural terrain excepting the easternmost stretch of the highway through Monroeville. It came into being in the late 1930s, and has not seen any significant changes since that time. SR 547's western endpoint is situated on the Seneca-Huron county line, which serves as the western boundary of the historic Firelands and Connecticut Western Reserve.

== Route description ==
The entirety of SR 547 is situated within Huron County. No portion of this route is included as a part of the National Highway System.

SR 547 begins at the intersection of SR 269 and Township Road 186 on the Seneca-Huron county line approximately four and a half miles (7.2 km) south of Bellevue. The vast majority of SR 547's path is in rural farm country, passing a house here and there along the way. Heading due east from the SR 269 intersection into Sherman Township, the state highway arrives at its junction with SR 4 just 0.74 miles (1.19 km) from its starting point. East of there, the route turns northeasterly, and as it passes a large clump of trees that abut the north side of the road, it meets Hayman Road. Crossing into Lyme Township, SR 547 next crosses Section Line Road. Continuing northeast through the vast farmland, the state highway passes intersections with Dogtown Road, Sand Hill Road and Townline Road, just past which the route enters Ridgefield Township. SR 547 then crosses T-intersections with Williams Road and Farr Road, after which it enters the village of Monroeville. At that point, the highway picks up the name Monroe Street, and passes into a backdrop that is primarily residential. After crossing the Wheeling and Lake Erie Railway tracks, the highway arrives at its junction with SR 99, a four-way stop intersection. SR 547 continues easterly through the residential portion of Monroeville prior to entering the central business district, where it comes to an end at the signalized intersection it has with the concurrency of US 20 and SR 18.

== History ==
SR 547 was designated in 1937 along the routing that it occupies to this day between SR 269 and US 20/SR 18. The highway has not experienced any major changes to its routing since it was first designated.

== Major intersections ==
The entire route is in Huron County.

Location	mi	km	Destinations	Notes
Sherman Township	0.00	0.00	SR 269 / Township Road 186	
Sherman Township	0.74	1.19	SR 4 – Bucyrus, Sandusky	
Monroeville	7.72	12.42	SR 99 (Ridge Street)	Western terminus of SR 547 Truck
Monroeville	8.18	13.16	US 20 / SR 18 (Main Street) / Milan Street	Eastern terminus of SR 547 Truck
1.000 mi = 1.609 km; 1.000 km = 0.621 mi

== Truck State Route 547 ==
State Route 547 Truck
- Location: Monroeville
- Length: 1.12 mi (1.80 km)

As SR 547 follows narrow two-lane Monroe Street through Monroeville between SR 99 and US 20/SR 18, trucks are prohibited from this stretch of highway. Consequently, a Truck State Route 547 (SR 547 Truck) is signed, starting from the junction of SR 547 and SR 99, following SR 99 north to US 20/SR 18, then following the concurrency southeasterly to downtown Monroeville intersection marking SR 547's eastern terminus, which doubles as the truck route's endpoint.
