= New London, Ohio =

- Village
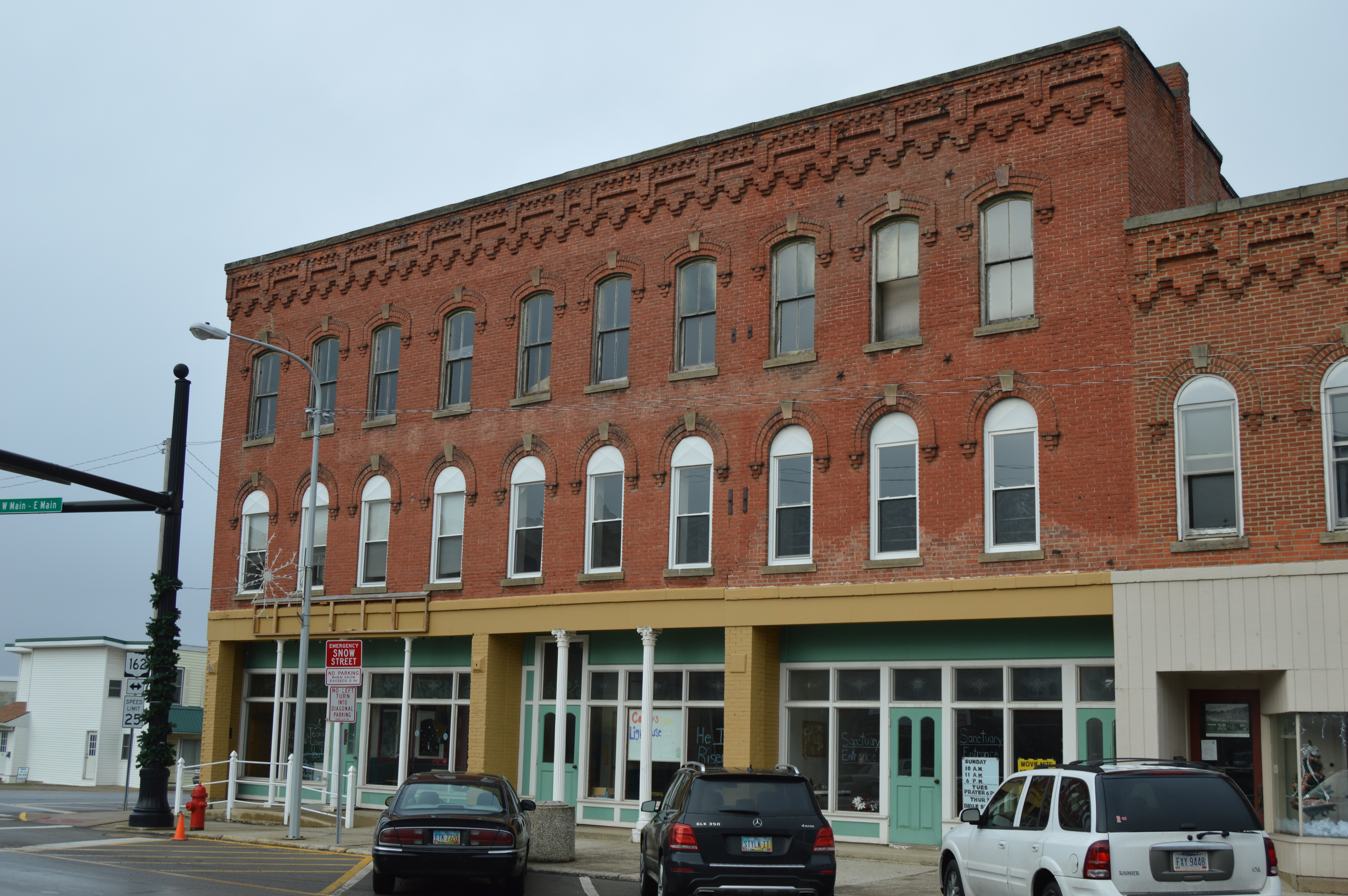
- Former Gregory House Hotel downtown

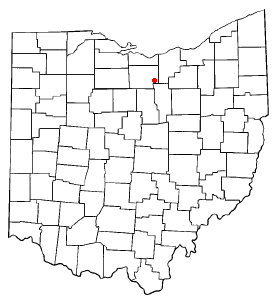
- Location of New London, Ohio

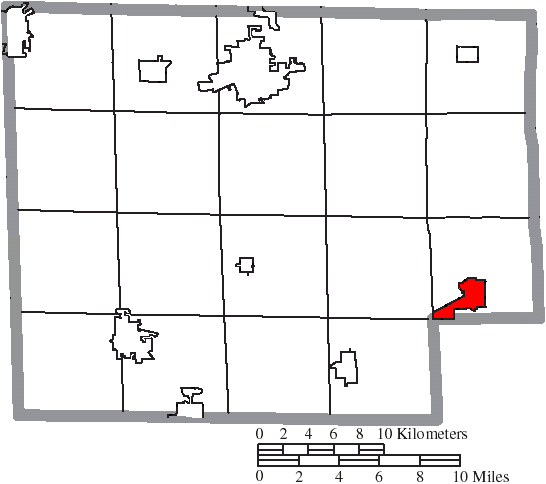
- Location of New London in Huron County
- Coordinates: 41°04′47″N 82°24′24″W
- Country: United States
- State: Ohio
- County: Huron

Area
  - Total: 2.54 sq mi (6.57 km^{2})
  - Land: 2.20 sq mi (5.71 km^{2})
  - Water: 0.33 sq mi (0.86 km^{2})
- Elevation: 984 ft (300 m)

Population (2020)
  - Total: 2,416
  - Density: 1,095.6/sq mi (423.02/km^{2})
- Time zone: UTC-5 (Eastern (EST))
  - Summer (DST): UTC-4 (EDT)
- ZIP code: 44851
- Area code: 419
- FIPS code: 39-54908
- GNIS feature ID: 2399472
- Website: www.newlondonoh.com

New London is a village in Huron County, Ohio, United States. The population was 2,416 at the 2020 census.

== History ==
The first permanent settlement at New London was made in 1816. The village was named after New London, Connecticut, the native home of a share of the early settlers. New London was incorporated in 1853. In the early 20th century, New London (popularly known as "Ferretville") was the center of the American ferret industry, with the surrounding region raising around 20,000 ferrets annually.

New London is home to a Carnegie library, built in 1914 and open since 1916.

== Geography ==
The village has a total area of 2.54 square miles (6.58 km^{2}), of which 2.21 square miles (5.72 km^{2}) is land and 0.33 square miles (0.85 km^{2}) is water. New London is bound to the north, west, and east by New London Township, and to the south by Ruggles Township in Ashland County. The village is located 24 miles (39 km) south of Lake Erie.

=== Cultural geography ===
New London's economy is closely tied to agriculture and manufacturing. Although well within the Great Lakes region (a sub region of the Midwest) and arguably located at the center of the Rust Belt, significant influences from New England and the South have contributed to New London's cultural identity. The village was founded by settlers from Connecticut (and to a lesser extent other parts of the Northeast) along with neighboring communities in the Firelands in the early nineteenth century. The village's New England heritage is most evident in its architecture, the names of local families, and the presence of a village green (a common characteristic of many cities and towns in Northern Ohio).

In the mid twentieth century, at the climax of the manufacturing boom in the Great Lakes region, New London welcomed an influx of new residents from the Appalachian South - primarily Eastern Kentucky - to work in fields and factories locally and in nearby metropolitan Cleveland. Today, the influence of these Southerners is most evident in the hospitality and kindness of New London's residents, and the close-knit community that has grown up in the midst of such diversity.

== Demographics ==
Historical population
Census	Pop.	Note	%±
1870	678		—
1880	1,011		49.1%
1890	1,096		8.4%
1900	1,180		7.7%
1910	1,557		31.9%
1920	1,470		−5.6%
1930	1,527		3.9%
1940	1,656		8.4%
1950	2,023		22.2%
1960	2,392		18.2%
1970	2,336		−2.3%
1980	2,449		4.8%
1990	2,642		7.9%
2000	2,696		2.0%
2010	2,461		−8.7%
2020	2,416		−1.8%
U.S. Decennial Census

=== 2010 census ===
As of the census of 2010, there were 2,461 people, 960 households, and 649 families living in the village. The population density was 1,113.6 inhabitants per square mile (430.0/km^{2}). There were 1,103 housing units at an average density of 499.1 per square mile (192.7/km^{2}). The racial makeup of the village was 95.8% White, 1.8% African American, 0.1% Asian, 0.1% Pacific Islander, 0.1% from other races, and 2.0% from two or more races. Hispanic or Latino of any race were 1.1% of the population.

There were 960 households, of which 35.8% had children under the age of 18 living with them, 47.7% were married couples living together, 15.1% had a female householder with no husband present, 4.8% had a male householder with no wife present, and 32.4% were non-families. 28.5% of all households were made up of individuals, and 12.6% had someone living alone who was 65 years of age or older. The average household size was 2.51 and the average family size was 3.05.

The median age in the village was 37.4 years. 26.8% of residents were under the age of 18; 7.8% were between the ages of 18 and 24; 25.8% were from 25 to 44; 24.8% were from 45 to 64; and 14.7% were 65 years of age or older. The gender makeup of the village was 48.3% male and 51.7% female.

=== 2000 census ===
As of the census of 2000, there were 2,696 people, 1,030 households, and 701 families living in the village. The population density was 1,281.8 inhabitants per square mile (494.9/km^{2}). There were 1,106 housing units at an average density of 525.8 per square mile (203.0/km^{2}). The racial makeup of the village was 95.88% White, 2.52% African American, 0.19% Asian, 0.07% Pacific Islander, 0.30% from other races, and 1.04% from two or more races. Hispanic or Latino of any race were 0.70% of the population.

There were 1,030 households, out of which 34.8% had children under the age of 18 living with them, 50.1% were married couples living together, 12.8% had a female householder with no husband present, and 31.9% were non-families. 27.9% of all households were made up of individuals, and 12.2% had someone living alone who was 65 years of age or older. The average household size was 2.57 and the average family size was 3.13.

In the village, the population was spread out, with 28.1% under the age of 18, 9.6% from 18 to 24, 27.6% from 25 to 44, 20.7% from 45 to 64, and 14.0% who were 65 years of age or older. The median age was 34 years. For every 100 females there were 94.1 males. For every 100 females age 18 and over, there were 89.4 males.

The median income for a household in the village was $32,813, and the median income for a family was $36,360. Males had a median income of $31,133 versus $22,857 for females. The per capita income for the village was $15,509. About 10.3% of families and 10.7% of the population were below the poverty line, including 10.0% of those under age 18 and 13.3% of those age 65 or over.

== Notable people ==
- Philip Johnson, architect
- Robin Meade, television personality
- Joseph Simon Newman, entrepreneur, inventor, poet
- Glenora Richards, painter
