= Ohio State Route 113 =

State highway in Ohio, US

State Route 113

Route information
- Maintained by ODOT
- Length: 59.64 mi (95.98 km)
- Existed: 1924–present

Major junctions
- West end: US 20 / SR 18 / SR 269 in Bellevue
- US 250 / SR 13 in Milan; US 20 / SR 57 / SR 301 in Elyria
- East end: US 6 / US 20 / SR 2 / SR 237 in Lakewood

Location
- Country: United States
- State: Ohio
- Counties: Huron, Erie, Lorain, Cuyahoga

Highway system
- Ohio State Highway System; Interstate; US; State; Scenic
← SR 112	→ SR 114

State Route 113 (SR 113) is an east–west highway in north central and northeastern Ohio. Its western terminus is at SR 269 in Bellevue, where SR 113 is initially concurrent with US 20 and SR 18; its eastern terminus is at the US 6 / SR 2 concurrency in Lakewood. Most of its eastern portion is also in a concurrency with US 20.

== History ==
SR 113 is an original state highway that originally went from SR 9 (now US 127) at the small town of Latty to SR 15 near Continental. The route's western terminus was extended to the Indiana state line in 1926, replacing SR 194 and part of SR 111, and its eastern terminus was extended to SR 109 north of Ottawa the same year. By 1931, the route had extended to SR 186 near McComb, replacing SR 187. By 1935, the route had extended to SR 18 near Bloomdale. Three years later it was extended again, this time all the way to Bellevue, by overlapping SR 18 and SR 12, then following the Sandusky County/Seneca County line to Bellevue, replacing SR 185. SR 113 was extended to Elyria in 1939, replacing SR 59, and to its current eastern terminus in 1940.

In 1959, when the bypass around Fremont opened, SR 113 was rerouted along it, following SR 12 from Bettsville to SR 53, then following that route on the bypass and overlapping US 20 from Fremont to Bellevue, where it continued on its old route to Lakewood. Except for a small stretch of road in downtown Fostoria, SR 113 was now completely concurrent from Bloomdale to Bellevue. Thus in 1970, the route was split into two separate highways. The concurrencies were removed, SR 113 was truncated at Bellevue, and the western part of the route (from the Indiana state line to Fostoria) was recertified as SR 613.

== Major junctions ==
County	Location	mi	km	Destinations	Notes
Huron	Bellevue	0.00	0.00	US 20 west / SR 18 west (West Main Street) / SR 269-D (Northwest Street / Southwest Street)	Western end of US 20 / SR 18 concurrency
Huron	Bellevue	0.09	0.14	SR 269 (Sandusky Street)	
Huron	Bellevue	0.97	1.56	US 20 east / SR 18 east / Brinker Street / Ridge Drive	Eastern end of US 20 / SR 18 concurrency
Huron	Lyme Township	3.07	4.94	SR 4 to Ohio Turnpike – Bucyrus, Sandusky	
Erie–Huron county line	Oxford–Ridgefield township line	6.34	10.20	SR 99 – Monroeville	
Erie	Milan Township	12.79	20.58	US 250 north / SR 13 north – Sandusky	Western end of US 250 / SR 13 concurrency
Erie	Milan	13.37	21.52	US 250 south / SR 13 south / Shaw Mill Road – Norwalk	Eastern end of US 250 / SR 13 concurrency
Erie	Milan	13.59	21.87	SR 601 south (Main Street)	Northern terminus of SR 601
Erie	Berlin Township	18.35	29.53	SR 61 south – Norwalk	Western end of SR 61 concurrency
Erie	Berlin Heights–Berlin Township municipal line	19.52	31.41	SR 61 north / CR 58 (Ceylon Road)	Western end of SR 61 concurrency
Erie	Florence Township	26.72	43.00	SR 60 – Vermilion, Wakeman	
Lorain	Amherst Township	35.10	56.49	SR 58 to I-80 / Ohio Turnpike – Oberlin, Lorain	
Lorain	Elyria	40.36	64.95	SR 57 north (Lorain Boulevard) to I-80 / Ohio Turnpike / I-90 – Lorain	Western end of SR 57 concurrency
Lorain	Elyria	42.43	68.28	SR 301 north (Abbe Road North)	Western end of SR 301 concurrency
Lorain	Elyria	43.05	69.28	US 20 west / SR 57 south / SR 301 south / Cleveland Street – Grafton	Eastern end of SR 57 / 301 concurrency; western end of US 20 concurrency
Lorain	North Ridgeville	46.19	74.34	SR 83 (Avon Belden Road) – Wooster, Avon Lake	Access to Ohio Turnpike and I-480 via SR 83 to Lorain road
Cuyahoga	Westlake	53.94	86.81	SR 252 (Columbia Road)	
Cuyahoga	Rocky River	58.59	94.29	US 6 Alt. west / SR 254-D (Detroit Road / Lake Road) to SR 254	Western end of US 6 Alt. concurrency; signed eastern terminus
Cuyahoga	Lakewood	58.75	94.55	US 6 Alt. east (Detroit Road) / Valley Parkway	Eastern end of US 6 Alt. concurrency
Cuyahoga	Lakewood	59.30	95.43	SR 237 south (West Clifton Avenue) / Northwood Avenue	Western end of SR 237 concurrency
Cuyahoga	Lakewood	59.64	95.98	US 6 / US 20 east / SR 2 (Clifton Boulevard) / SR 237 ends	Eastern end of US 20 / SR 237 concurrency; designated eastern terminus of SR 113
1.000 mi = 1.609 km; 1.000 km = 0.621 mi: Concurrency terminus
