= John Wright Mansion =

Historic house in Ohio, United States

- U.S. National Register of Historic Places
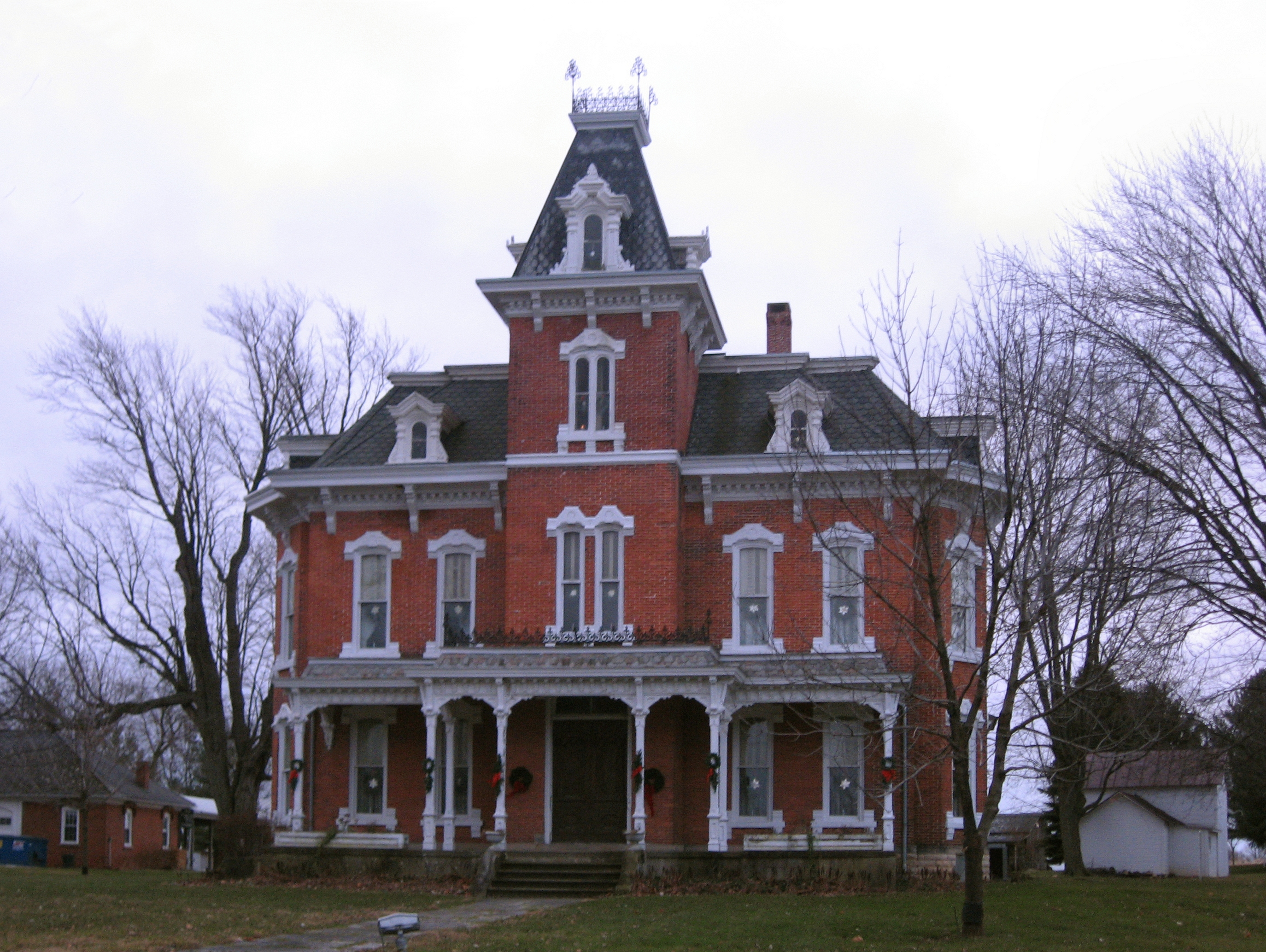
- Front of the house

- Location within Ohio Location within the United States
- Location: State Route 113 west of State Route 4, northeast of Bellevue, Ohio
- Coordinates: 41°16′53″N 82°47′25″W
- Area: Less than 1 acre (0.40 ha)
- Built: 1881
- Architectural style: Second Empire
- NRHP reference No.: 74001530
- Added to NRHP: February 27, 1974

The John Wright Mansion is a historic farmhouse located east of Bellevue in northwestern Huron County, Ohio, United States. Built in 1881, it represents an unusual combination of location and architectural styles.

A native of England, John Wright settled in the United States in 1833, moving quickly to Huron County. Here, he quickly began to increase his wealth and buy real estate; when he finished buying land, he was in possession of approximately 2,500 acres (1,000 ha). Besides buying land, he was prominent for his military service as a four-year veteran of the United States Army during the Civil War.

When Wright decided to build the present house, he chose to employ the Second Empire style of architecture. This combination was quite unusual: Second Empire houses are found far more often in urban settings, and massive residences of the style are very rare on farmsteads in the region. Built of brick, this three-story house is topped with a mansard roof and prominent dormers; the front is symmetrical and ornamented with a bracketed porch in the Italianate style. Toward the rear, a wing as tall as the rest of the house extends southward; the interior is composed of a substantial ballroom and twenty-three other rooms.

In early 1974, the Wright Mansion was listed on the National Register of Historic Places, qualifying because of its distinctive historic architecture. Today, the mansion is part of Historic Lyme Village, a volunteer-based organization that operates it as a historic house museum.
