= Greenfield Township, Huron County, Ohio =

Township in Ohio, US

- Township
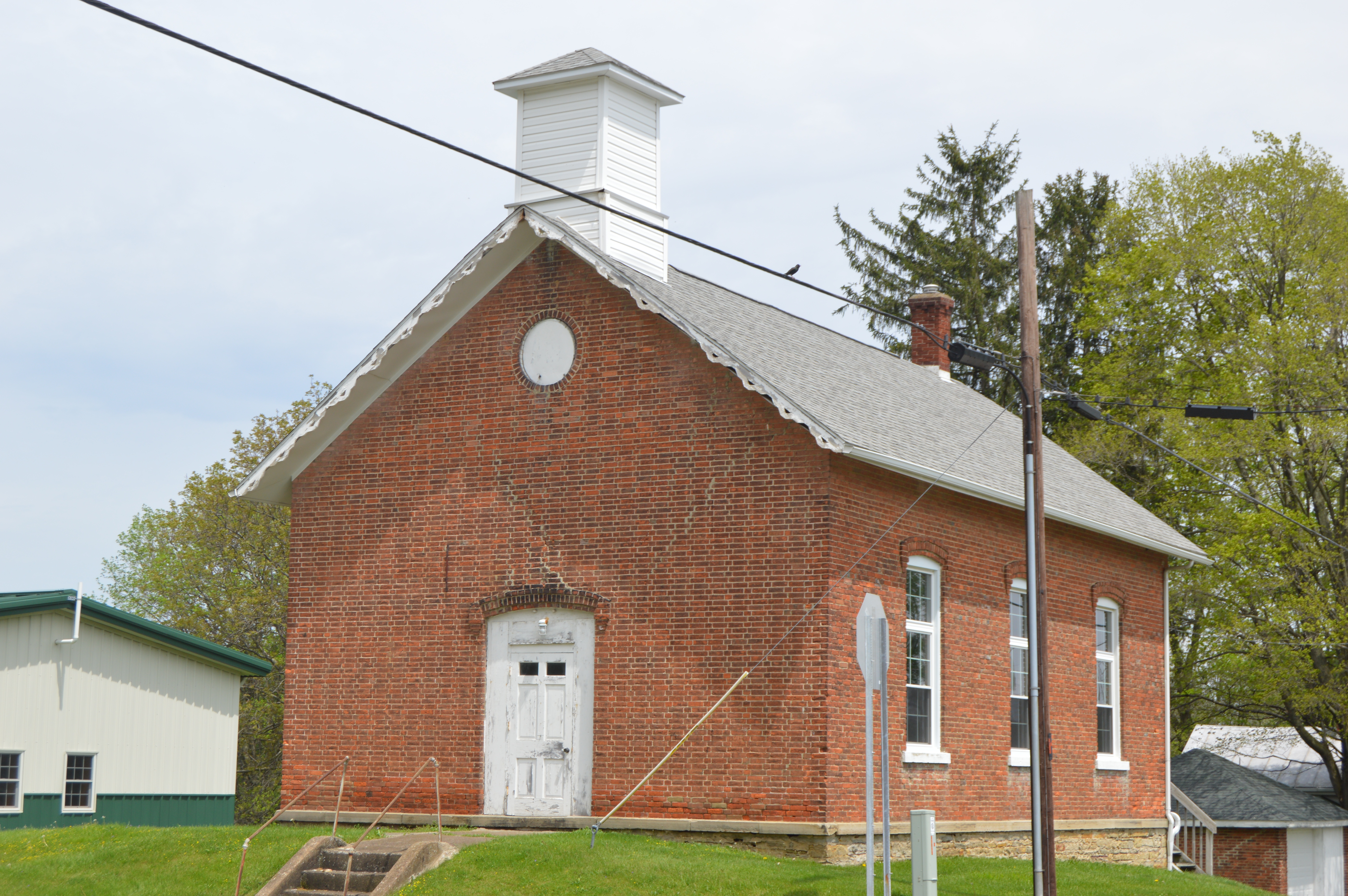
- Township hall at Steuben

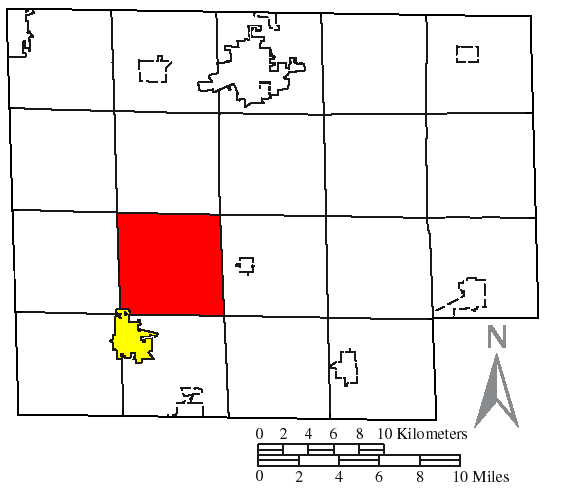
- Location of Greenfield Township (red) in Huron County, next to the city of Willard (yellow)
- Coordinates: 41°5′32″N 82°41′58″W
- Country: United States
- State: Ohio
- County: Huron

Area
  - Total: 25.6 sq mi (66.4 km^{2})
  - Land: 25.2 sq mi (65.3 km^{2})
  - Water: 0.42 sq mi (1.1 km^{2})
- Elevation: 869 ft (265 m)

Population (2020)
  - Total: 1,320
  - Density: 52.4/sq mi (20.2/km^{2})
- Time zone: UTC-5 (Eastern (EST))
  - Summer (DST): UTC-4 (EDT)
- FIPS code: 39-32102
- GNIS feature ID: 1086346

Greenfield Township is one of the nineteen townships of Huron County, Ohio, United States. As of the 2020 census the population of the township was 1,320.

== Geography ==
Located in the western part of the county, it borders the following townships:

- Peru Township - north
- Bronson Township - northeast corner
- Fairfield Township - east
- Ripley Township - southeast corner
- New Haven Township - south
- Richmond Township - southwest corner
- Norwich Township - west
- Sherman Township - northwest corner

The city of Willard borders the southwestern corner of Greenfield Township, and the unincorporated community of Steuben lies at the center of the township, while part of the census-designated place of Holiday Lakes is also located within the township.

== Name and history ==
Greenfield Township was organized in 1815.

It is named after Greenfield Hill, a historic neighborhood in Fairfield, Connecticut. Statewide, other Greenfield Townships are located in Fairfield and Gallia Counties.

== Government ==
The township is governed by a three-member board of trustees, who are elected in November of odd-numbered years to a four-year term beginning on the following January 1. Two are elected in the year after the presidential election and one is elected in the year before it. There is also an elected township fiscal officer, who serves a four-year term beginning on April 1 of the year after the election, which is held in November of the year before the presidential election. Vacancies in the fiscal officership or on the board of trustees are filled by the remaining trustees.
