= North Fairfield, Ohio =

- Village
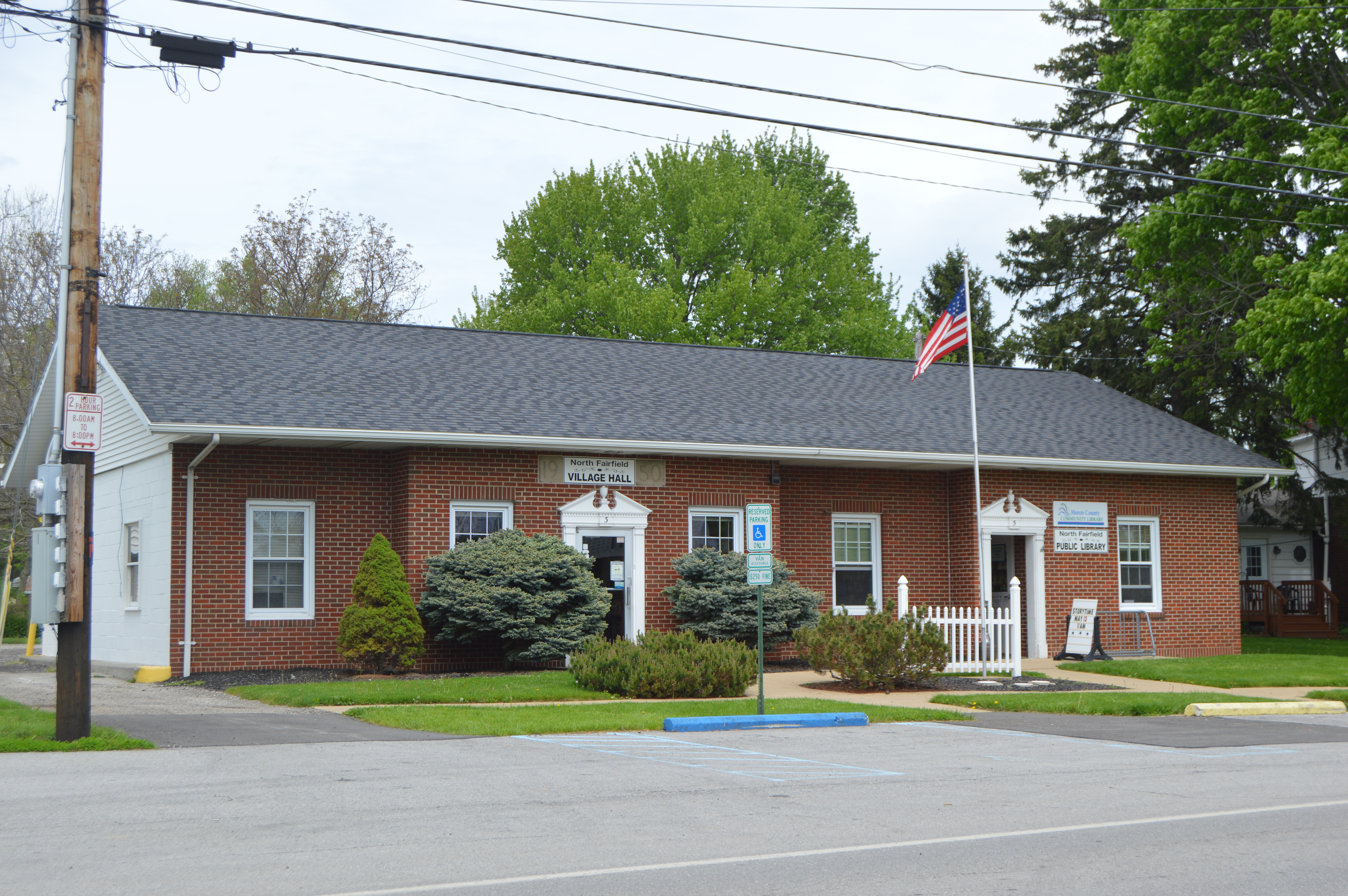
- Library and village hall on Main Street

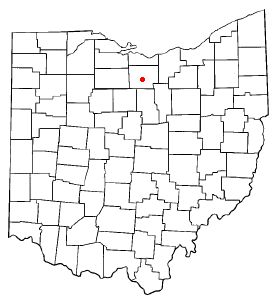
- Location of North Fairfield, Ohio

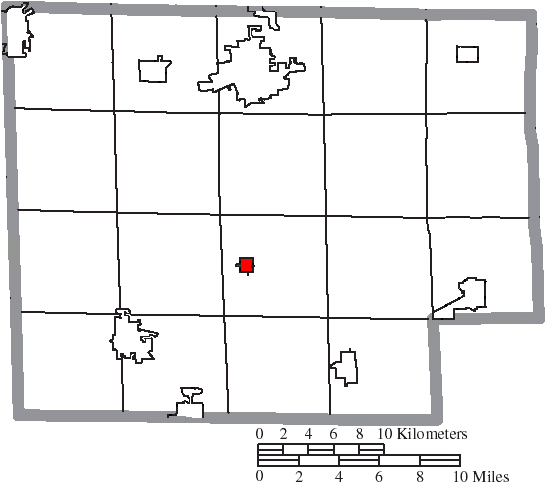
- Location of North Fairfield in Huron County
- Coordinates: 41°06′16″N 82°36′49″W
- Country: United States
- State: Ohio
- County: Huron

Area
  - Total: 0.46 sq mi (1.20 km^{2})
  - Land: 0.46 sq mi (1.20 km^{2})
  - Water: 0.0039 sq mi (0.01 km^{2})
- Elevation: 935 ft (285 m)

Population (2020)
  - Total: 465
  - Density: 1,006.8/sq mi (388.74/km^{2})
- Time zone: UTC-5 (Eastern (EST))
  - Summer (DST): UTC-4 (EDT)
- ZIP code: 44855
- Area code: 419
- FIPS code: 39-56420
- GNIS feature ID: 2399514
- Website: northfairfieldv.com

North Fairfield is a village in Huron County, Ohio, United States. The population was 465 at the 2020 census.

North Fairfield is served by a branch of the Willard Memorial Library.

== History ==
A post office called North Fairfield has been in operation since 1828. The village derives its name from Fairfield Township.

== Geography ==
According to the United States Census Bureau, the village has a total area of 0.46 square miles (1.19 km^{2}), all land.

== Demographics ==
Historical population
Census	Pop.	Note	%±
1940	406		—
1950	468		15.3%
1960	547		16.9%
1970	540		−1.3%
1980	525		−2.8%
1990	504		−4.0%
2000	573		13.7%
2010	560		−2.3%
2020	465		−17.0%
U.S. Decennial Census

=== 2010 census ===
As of the census of 2010, there were 560 people, 182 households, and 141 families living in the village. The population density was 1,217.4 inhabitants per square mile (470.0/km^{2}). There were 202 housing units at an average density of 439.1 per square mile (169.5/km^{2}). The racial makeup of the village was 96.8% White, 0.2% Native American, 1.1% Asian, 0.2% from other races, and 1.8% from two or more races. Hispanic or Latino of any race were 0.9% of the population.

There were 182 households, of which 44.0% had children under the age of 18 living with them, 61.0% were married couples living together, 11.5% had a female householder with no husband present, 4.9% had a male householder with no wife present, and 22.5% were non-families. 18.1% of all households were made up of individuals, and 10.4% had someone living alone who was 65 years of age or older. The average household size was 3.08 and the average family size was 3.45.

The median age in the village was 32.9 years. 31.1% of residents were under the age of 18; 8.1% were between the ages of 18 and 24; 25.7% were from 25 to 44; 26.2% were from 45 to 64; and 9.1% were 65 years of age or older. The gender makeup of the village was 50.5% male and 49.5% female.

=== 2000 census ===
As of the census of 2000, there were 573 people, 178 households, and 153 families living in the village. The population density was 1,229.2 inhabitants per square mile (474.6/km^{2}). There were 190 housing units at an average density of 407.6 per square mile (157.4/km^{2}). The racial makeup of the village was 96.16% White, 0.17% Native American, 0.35% Asian, 1.22% from other races, and 2.09% from two or more races. Hispanic or Latino of any race were 5.93% of the population.

There were 178 households, out of which 48.9% had children under the age of 18 living with them, 71.9% were married couples living together, 9.6% had a female householder with no husband present, and 14.0% were non-families. 11.8% of all households were made up of individuals, and 3.4% had someone living alone who was 65 years of age or older. The average household size was 3.10 and the average family size was 3.33.

In the village, the population was spread out, with 31.8% under the age of 18, 10.6% from 18 to 24, 33.0% from 25 to 44, 18.0% from 45 to 64, and 6.6% who were 65 years of age or older. The median age was 29 years. For every 100 females there were 113.0 males. For every 100 females age 18 and over, there were 112.5 males.

The median income for a household in the village was $41,923, and the median income for a family was $46,250. Males had a median income of $33,750 versus $17,750 for females. The per capita income for the village was $16,557. About 6.0% of families and 9.9% of the population were below the poverty line, including 9.0% of those under age 18 and 13.2% of those age 65 or over.
