= EHOVE Career Center =

Coordinates: 41°19′54″N 82°37′56″W

- Established: 1968; 57 years ago
- Superintendent: Chris McCully
- Students: 900+ High School & 3000+ Adult Ed annually
- Location: Milan, Ohio, U.S.
- Website: https://www.ehove.net/

EHOVE Career Center is a public vocational school in Milan, Ohio. EHOVE is an acronym that stands for Erie Huron Ottawa Vocational Education. While Erie, Huron and Ottawa counties are the primary covered counties in the district, the school also serves students in nearby Lorain, Sandusky, and Seneca counties, as well as small parts of Ashland and Richland counties.

Altogether the high school has an enrollment of 900 high school sophomore, junior and senior students from about 16 different associate school districts. Upon graduation, students earn a certificate from EHOVE, along with a high school diploma from their home high school.

== Partner schools ==
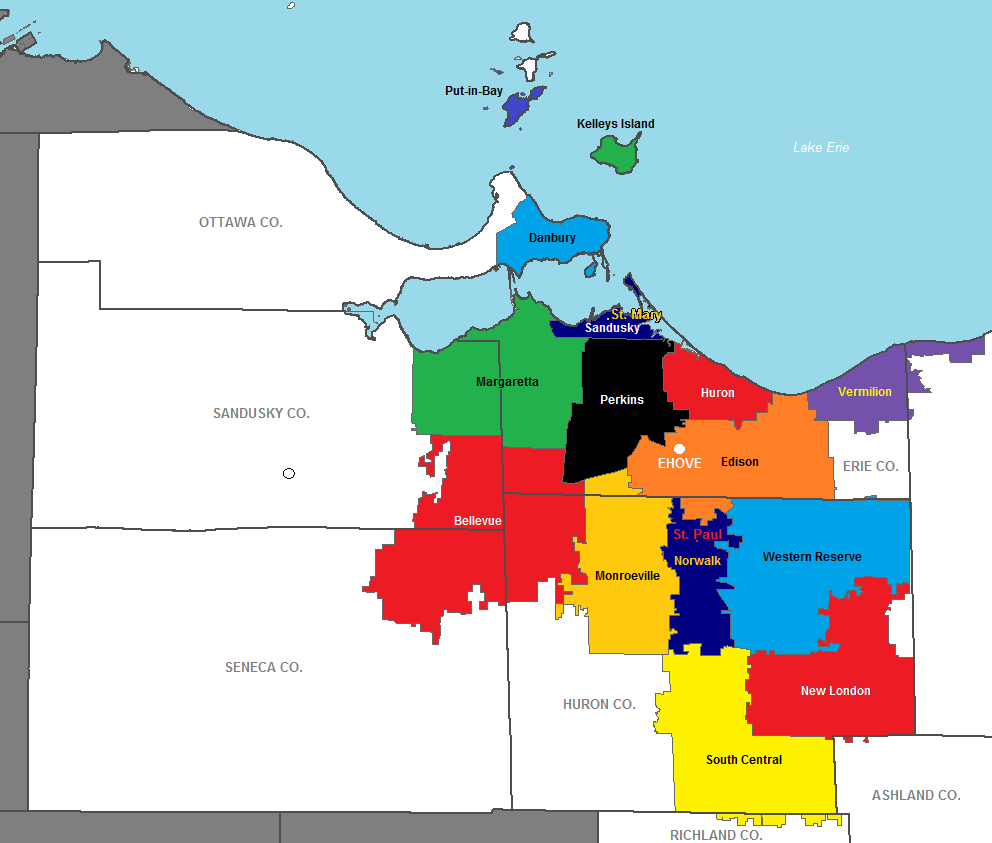
School districts served by EHOVE. EHOVE's location is marked with a white circle in Edison's school district.

- Bellevue High School
- Danbury High School
- Edison High School
- Huron High School
- Kelleys Island School
- Margaretta High School
- Monroeville High School
- New London High School
- Norwalk High School
- Perkins High School
- Put-In-Bay High School
- St. Mary Central Catholic High School
- St. Paul High School
- South Central High School
- Vermilion High School
- Western Reserve High School

== History ==
In the 1960s with the completion of the Ohio Turnpike and other local growths in the economy and infrastructure, Ohio government officials began to consider the creation of a vocational school that could provide worker training through the public school system. In 1965 the Erie Huron Ottawa Vocational Board (EHOVE) was formed to plan the school in the Erie and Huron County area. Much of the building funds were matched with public funding measures passed with the help of Ohio's 61st and 63rd Governor James A. Rhodes.

The school opened its doors in the fall of 1968.
