= Firelands Conference =

High school athletics conference in Ohio, USA

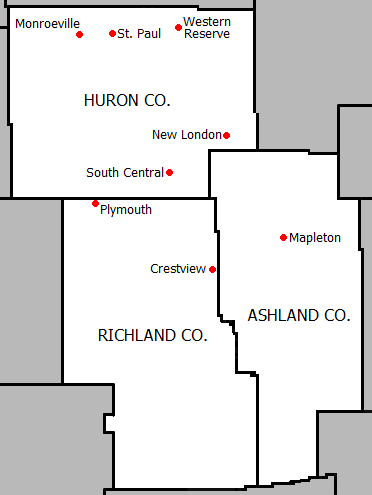
The locations of current member schools of the Firelands Conference.

The Firelands Conference is an Ohio High School Athletic Association (OHSAA) athletic league located in north-central Ohio. The league was formed in the 1960–61 school year and is named for the Firelands area of the old Western Reserve, where most of the member schools reside. High schools in this conference are located in Ashland, Huron, and Richland counties. Some of the schools' district boundaries extend into the neighboring counties of Crawford, Erie, and Lorain. Most of the founding schools came from the defunct Huron-Erie League.

== Members ==
School	Nickname	Location	Colors	Tenure
Crestview	Cougars	Weller Township	Red, white, black	1982–
Mapleton	Mounties	Orange Township	Royal blue, red	1963–
Monroeville	Eagles	Monroeville	Black, gold	1960–
New London	Wildcats	New London	Red, black,	1970–
Plymouth	Big Red	Plymouth	Red, white	1982–
St. Paul	Flyers	Norwalk	Red, black	1968–
South Central	Trojans	Greenwich	Gold, white, & black	1960–
Western Reserve	Roughriders	Collins	Blue, white	1960–

=== Former members ===
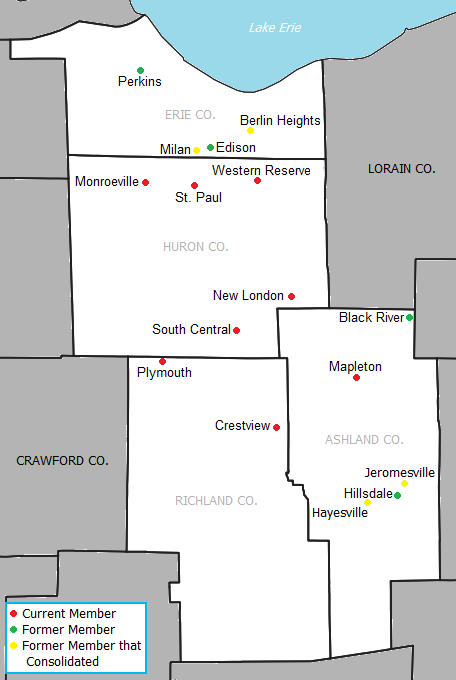
All-time FC members.

School	Nickname	Location	Colors	Tenure	Notes
Black River	Pirates	Sullivan	Black, gold	1964–1993	Left for the Mohican Athletic Conference
Edison	Chargers	Milan	Blue, orange	1968–1986	Left for the Sandusky Bay Conference
Berlin Heights	Tigers	Berlin Heights	Orange, black	1960–1968	Consolidated into Edison HS in 1968
Milan	Indians	Milan	Red, white	1960–1968	Consolidated into Edison HS in 1968
Hillsdale	Falcons	Jeromesville	Columbia blue, gold	1963–1970	Left for the Wayne County Athletic League
Hayesville	Panthers	Hayesville	Orange, black	1963	Consolidated into Hillsdale HS in 1963
Jeromesville	Blue Jays	Jeromesville	Blue, white	1963	Consolidated into Hillsdale HS in 1963
Perkins	Pirates	Perkins	Black, white, red	1960–1963	left prior to the conclusion of the 1962–63 school year

== History ==
The Fireland Conference was established in 1960 with most schools coming from the Huron–Erie League, with founding members Berlin Heights, Milan, Monroeville, South Central, Perkins and Western Reserve High Schools. Perkins left the conference prior to the conclusion of the 1962–1963 school year. Hayesville, Jeromesville and Mapleton became members during the spring 1963 season, which Hayesville and Jeromesville quickly left, following the consolidations of both schools to form Hillsdale, who joined in 1963. Black River became a member in 1964. In 1965, Berlin Heights and Milan consolidated their school districts, but had remained separate high schools until 1968, when both consolidated to form Edison, who remained in the conference. St. Paul joined the same year.

Hillsdale left the Firelands Conference in 1970, in favor of joining the Wayne County Athletic League. New London took their place for after leaving the Lakeland Conference.

Crestview and Plymouth joined the league in 1982, with the league splitting into two divisions: North (Edison, Monroeville, New London, St. Paul, Western Reserve) and South (Black River, Crestview, Mapleton, Plymouth, South Central). Edison left for the Sandusky Bay Conference in 1986, with the divisions dissolving after their departure. Black River left for the Mohican Area Conference in 1993.

=== State championships ===
Current Firelands Conference member schools have won a total of 11 team state championships, dating back to the beginning of Ohio High School Athletic Association sponsored tournaments.

School	Sport	Year
Crestview	Golf	2012
Monroeville	Boys basketball Boys wrestling	1984 2010
New London	Boys track and field Boys cross country	1946* 1993
Plymouth	Boys cross country	1971, 1974*
St. Paul	Girls volleyball Football	2002, 2006 1969, 2009

* State championship won before the school was affiliated with the Firelands Conference.

== See also ==
- Ohio High School Athletic Association
- Ohio High School Athletic Conferences
