= Northern 8 Football Conference =

High school 8-man football conference

The Northern 8 Football Conference is a high school football conference for schools that participate in 8-man football. It is sponsored by the Ohio High School Football Coaches Association (OHSFCA) and began competition in the 2020–21 school year. As of 2026, the conference has 9 members, with 8 located across northern Ohio and a 1-member school in northwestern Pennsylvania.

== Members ==
Map of members beginning with the 2026 season.

School	Nickname	Location	Colors	Joined	Notes
Chalker	Wildcats	Southington	Orange, black	2024	
Danbury	Lakers	Lakeside	Blue, white	2020	
Holgate	Tigers	Holgate	Purple, gold	2020	
Kennedy Catholic	Eagles	Hermitage	Maroon, gold	2026	
Plymouth	Big Red	Plymouth	Red, white	2026	
St. Mary Central Catholic	Panthers	Sandusky	Navy blue, Vegas gold	2021	
St. Joseph Central Catholic	Crimson Streaks	Fremont	Crimson, gray	2024	
Sebring McKinley	Trojans	Sebring	Purple, gold	2023	
Windham	Bombers	Windham	Black, gold	2026	

== Former members ==
School	Nickname	Location	Colors	Tenure	Note
Cardinal Stritch	Cardinals	Oregon	Red, black	2025	Canceled football season in 2026 due to low numbers, school closed.
Stryker	Panthers	Stryker	Blue, white	2020–2026	Leaving in 2027 for a Michigan-based conference
Toledo Christian	Eagles	Toledo	Blue, Gold	2020–2024	Returned to traditional 11-man football

== History ==
The Northern 8 Football Conference was created in October 2019 when Stryker and Toledo Christian agreed at a meeting to form the league for OHSAA schools that are committing to play 8-man football. The OHSAA does not currently sponsor 8-man football, but several member schools chose to play 8-man or choosing not to play their seasons. Stryker and Toledo Christian forfeited their football membership in the Toledo Area Athletic Conference but remained members of the Buckeye Border Conference and the TAAC respectively, for all other sports. Two other schools that attended the initial meeting would later get board approval to join the league, Holgate agreed to join later on in October 2019 and Danbury joined in November 2019. Holgate was ultimately kicked out of the Green Meadows Conference for their decision to go 8-man but later joined Stryker in the BBC for all other sports beginning in 2021. Danbury also remained in the Sandusky Bay Conference's River Division for other sports.

St. Mary Central Catholic was invited to join in the league for a minimum of two years and accepted their invitation in 2021 but intended to get back to 11-man football eventually. As of 2023 they still intend to play in the N8FC.

The league announced in October 2022 that Sebring McKinley of the Mahoning Valley Athletic Conference was invited to join for the 2023 season. The Trojans had similar issues with low roster numbers and had only won 37 games between 1993 and 2022 after posting their last winning record at 6–4 in 1992. The N8FC hosted its first ever 8-man State Championship in November 2022, which is currently being sponsored by the OHFSCA. The Holgate Tigers defeated the Toledo Christian Eagles 37–34.

On October 20, 2023, St. Joseph Central Catholic announced their intention to play 8-man football beginning in 2024 with their belief that it would offer safer competition against schools closer to their size. Less than a month later on November 7, 2023, the conference announced they had admitted SJCC into the league as well as Southington Chalker, beginning in 2024. Chalker fielded a varsity football team for the first time since 2020, as they were not able to field a team in 2021. They became a club football team in 2022 and played a hybrid JV/8-man schedule in the 2022 and 2023 seasons.

Toledo Christian announced in December 2024 that they would returning to 11-man football in 2025. They spent the 2025–26 season as an independent school for football and will return to the Toledo Area Athletic Conference as a member for all sports beginning the in 2026–27 school year.

Cardinal Stritch announced the return of its football program in April 2025 and that they'd be joining the N8FC after having cancelled two of its previous three seasons due to low participation.

Kennedy Catholic of Hermitage, Pennsylvania was officially accepted into the league in November 2025 along with Windham. The Eagles played an 8-man schedule with N8FC opponents in 2025 but didn't officially join the league until the 2026 season. Windham chose the 8-man route after seeing dwindling enrollment and roster numbers for the past few seasons.

Stryker announced in July 2026 that they would depart from the N8FC after the 2026 season to join a new Michigan-based conference. This decision, according to the Stryker Board of Education, was made to reduce travel costs, shorten travel times, and ensure greater conference stability.

After just one season in the league, Cardinal Stritch canceled their football season due to low student participation, and lack of volunteers to support a 2026 season, effectively suspending their membership in the conference. The Cardinals have only played two seasons since 2021, with their 2022 and 2024 seasons both canceled due to low numbers, which prompted the Cardinals to join the N8FC originally. Plymouth joined the conference in August 2026 to replace Cardinal Stritch, after announcing they would become an 8-man football team for the 2026 season. In October 2026, Cardinal Stritch announced the school would cease operations in December, citing financial instability and low enrollment numbers of only 69 students.

The league is actively looking for more schools to commit to a two-year membership. They have not set a definite number of schools to be members.

== Conference championship history ==
Year	School	Location	Nickname	Conference Record	Overall Record
2026	St. Mary Central Catholic	Sandusky	Panthers	9-0	10-0
2025	St. Mary Central Catholic/St. Joseph Central Catholic/Chalker	Sandusky/Fremont/Southington	Panthers/Crimson Streaks/Wildcats	6-1	9-1/7-3/8-1
2024	Toledo Christian	Toledo	Eagles	9-0	11-0
2023	Toledo Christian	Toledo	Eagles	5-0	8-1
2022	Toledo Christian	Toledo	Eagles	6-1	9-2
2021	Toledo Christian	Toledo	Eagles	4-0	8-1
2020	Danbury	Lakeside	Lakers	3-0	8-0

== 8-man state championship history ==
Date	Winning team	Losing team	Winning team Score	Losing team Score	Location	Notes
November 4, 2023	Toledo Christian Eagles	Holgate Tigers	46	6	Rex Lingruen Stadium, Liberty Center, OH	First ever Championship game.
November 16, 2024	Toledo Christian Eagles	St. Mary Central Catholic Panthers	24	0	Don Paul Stadium, Fremont, OH	
November 8, 2025	St. Mary Central Catholic	Chalker Wildcats	34	20	Leetonia Bears Stadium, Leetonia, OH	First game hosted in Eastern Ohio.
November 7, 2026	St. Mary Central Catholic	St. Joesph Central Catholic	35	25	Wentling Field Carey, Ohio	

8-man championship appearances by team

Team	Wins	Loses	Seasons
St. Mary Central Catholic Panthers	2	1	2024, **2025, 2026**
Toledo Christian Eagles	2	0	**2023, 2024**
St. Joesph Central Catholic	0	1	2026
Chalker Wildcats	0	1	2025
Holgate Tigers	0	1	2023
Danbury Lakers	0	0	
Sebring Trojans	0	0	
Cardinal Stritch Cardinals	0	0	
Stryker Panthers	0	0	
Windham Bombers	0	0	
Kennedy Catholic Eagles	0	0	

Bold denotes years team won championship.
