= Ohio State Route 603 =

State highway in northern Ohio, US

State Route 603

Route information
- Maintained by ODOT
- Length: 33.58 mi (54.04 km)
- Existed: 1938–present

Major junctions
- South end: SR 95 near Perrysville
- SR 430 near Mifflin; US 30 near Mifflin; US 42 near Ashland
- North end: SR 61 / SR 98 in Plymouth

Location
- Country: United States
- State: Ohio
- Counties: Richland, Ashland

Highway system
- Ohio State Highway System; Interstate; US; State; Scenic
← SR 602	→ SR 604

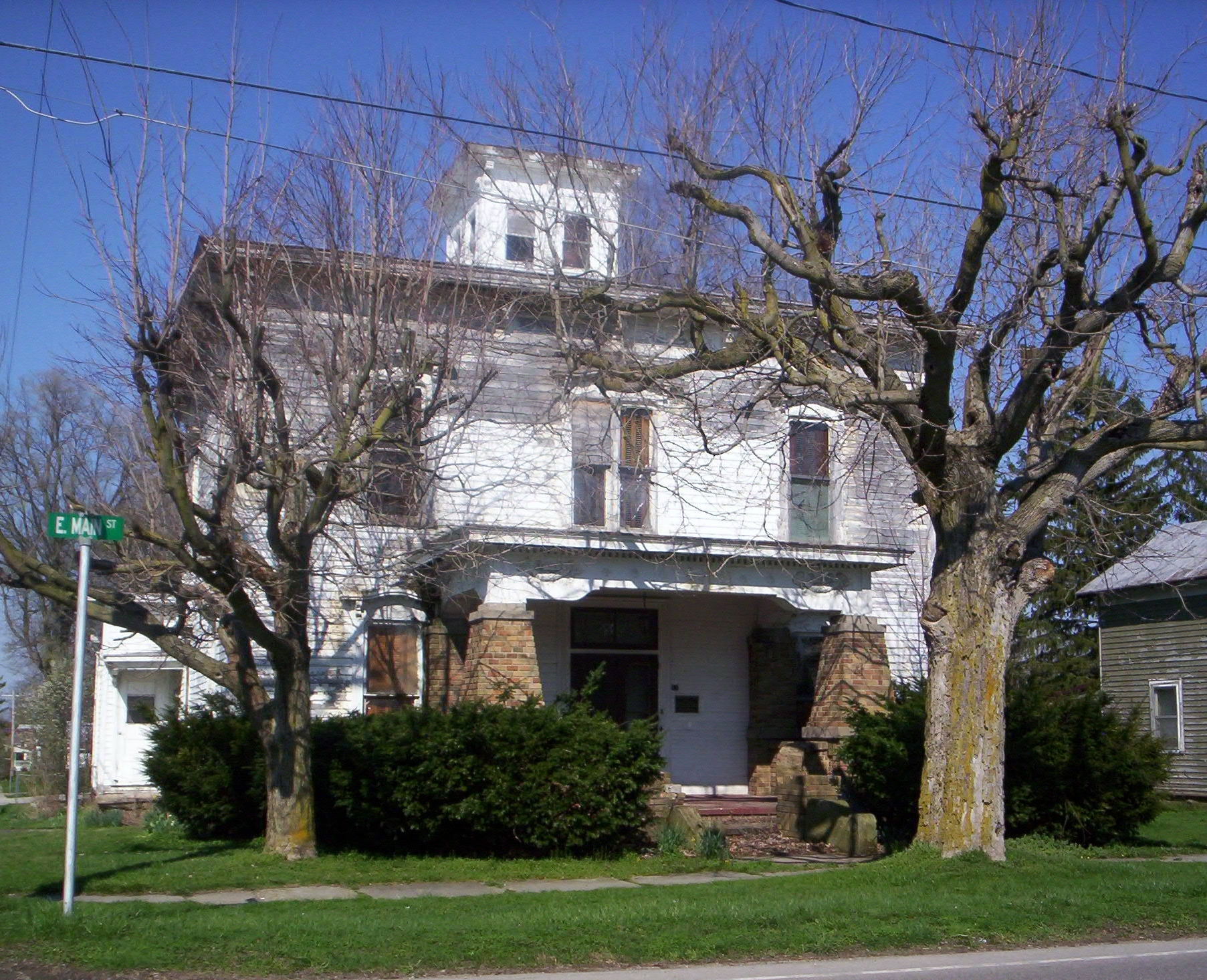
The Silas Ferrell House, a historic site on State Route 603 at Shiloh

State Route 603 (SR 603) is a north–south state highway in the northern portion of the U.S. state of Ohio. Its southern terminus is at State Route 95 near Perrysville, and its northern terminus is at State Routes 61 and 98 in Plymouth along the Baseline Road that separates Huron County and Richland County, and subsequently the southern boundary of the Firelands and Connecticut Western Reserve.

== History ==
SR 603 was commissioned in 1938 along its current alignment, between Shiloh and SR 95. Between 1953 and 1955 the route was paved. The route was extended west to Plymouth between 1959 and 1961.

== Major intersections ==
County	Location	mi	km	Destinations	Notes
Richland	Monroe Township	0.00	0.00	SR 95 – Perrysville, Butler	
Richland	Monroe Township	4.72	7.60	SR 39 – Perrysville, Lucas	
Ashland	Mifflin Township	9.98	16.06	SR 430 west	Eastern terminus of SR 430
Ashland	Mifflin Township	10.60	17.06	US 30 – Mansfield, Wooster	
Richland	No major junctions				
Ashland	Milton Township	13.63	21.94	US 42 – Mansfield, Ashland	
Richland	Weller Township	18.71	30.11	SR 545 (North Olivesburg Road) – Mansfield, Savannah	
Richland	Weller Township	19.09	30.72	SR 96 – Shelby, Ashland	
Richland	Blooming Grove Township	23.11	37.19	SR 13 – Mansfield, Norwalk	
Richland–Huron county line	Plymouth	33.58	54.04	SR 61 / SR 98 (Plymouth Street / Sandusky Street) / West Broadway Street	
1.000 mi = 1.609 km; 1.000 km = 0.621 mi
