= John Matsko (American football coach) =

American football coach (born 1951)

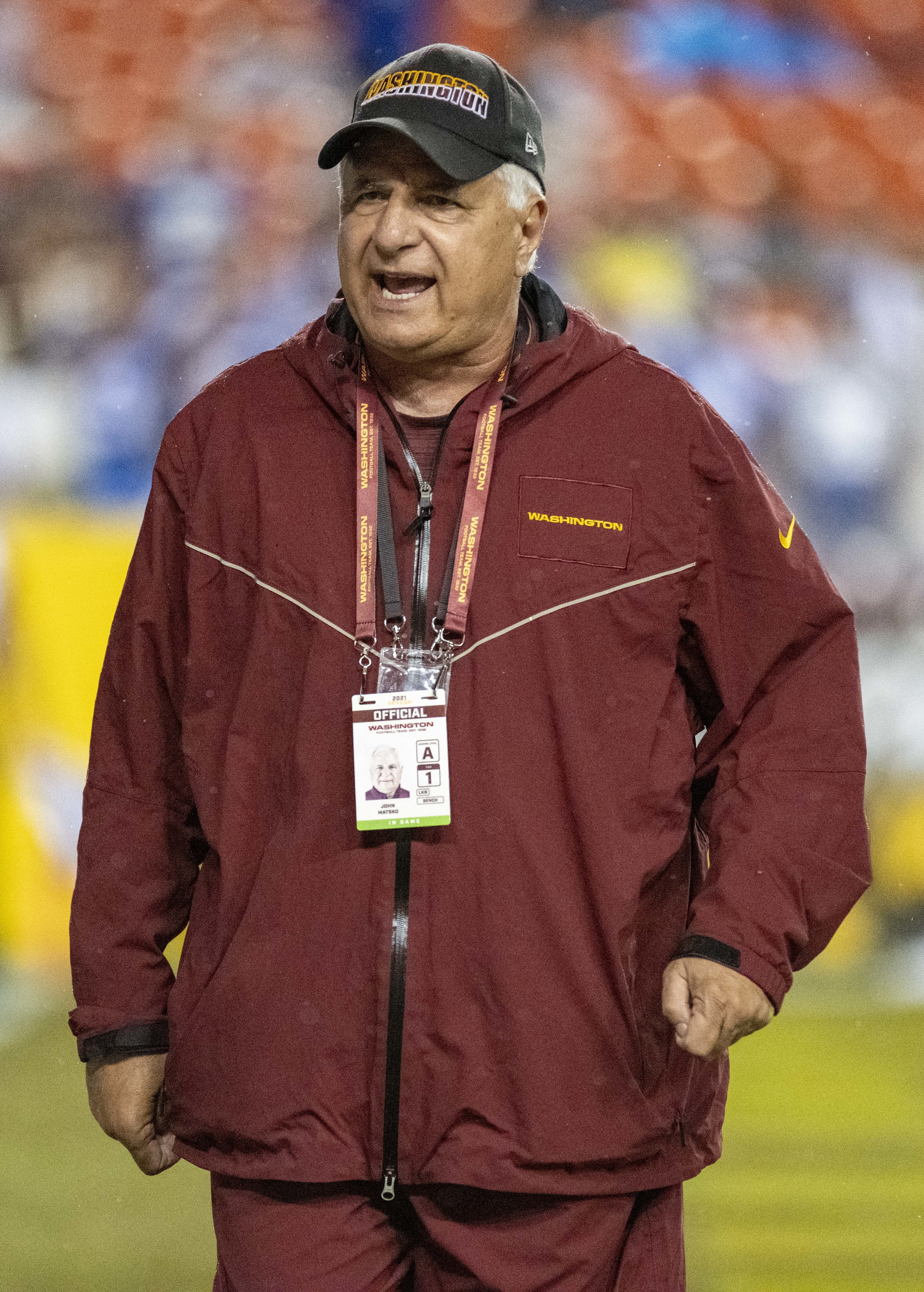
- Matsko with the Washington Football Team in 2021

Personal information
- Born: February 2, 1951 (age 75); Cleveland, Ohio, U.S.

Career information
- College: Kent State

Career history
- Miami (OH) (1974–1975) Graduate assistant; Danbury High School (1976) Head coach; Miami (OH) (1977) Offensive line coach; North Carolina (1978–1984) Offensive coordinator/offensive line coach; Navy (1985) Offensive line coach; Arizona (1986) Offensive line coach; USC (1987–1988) Offensive line coach; USC (1989–1991) Offensive coordinator; Phoenix Cardinals (1992–1993) Offensive line coach; New Orleans Saints (1994–1996) Offensive line coach; New York Giants (1997–1998) Offensive line coach; St. Louis Rams (1999–2005) Offensive line coach; Kansas City Chiefs (2006–2007) Offensive line coach; Baltimore Ravens (2008–2010) Offensive line coach; Carolina Panthers (2011–2019) Offensive line coach; Washington Football Team / Commanders (2020–2022) Offensive line coach

Awards and highlights
- Super Bowl champion (XXXIV)

John Matsko (born February 2, 1951) is an American football offensive line coach who coached for several college football and National Football League (NFL) teams.

== Coaching career ==
Matsko was hired by the Baltimore Ravens in January 2008; he was fired in January 2011. The next day, he was hired by the Carolina Panthers to work under head coach Ron Rivera and offensive coordinator Rob Chudzinski. Prior to being hired in Baltimore, Matsko held the same position for the Kansas City Chiefs during the 2006 and 2007 seasons. Prior to that, Matsko coached professionally for the Arizona Cardinals, New Orleans Saints, New York Giants, and St. Louis Rams.

In the 2015 season, Matsko and the Panthers reached Super Bowl 50 on February 7, 2016. The Panthers fell to the Denver Broncos by a score of 24–10.

Matsko coached at the college football level at Kent State, Miami (Ohio), North Carolina, Navy, Arizona and USC.

In January 2020, Matsko joined the Washington Football Team, then known as the Redskins, as their offensive line coach under new head coach Ron Rivera. In March 2023, Matsko was fired following the hiring of new offensive coordinator Eric Bieniemy.

== College career ==
Matsko played at Kent State University.
