= Shiloh, Richland County, Ohio =

Shiloh, Ohio
- Village
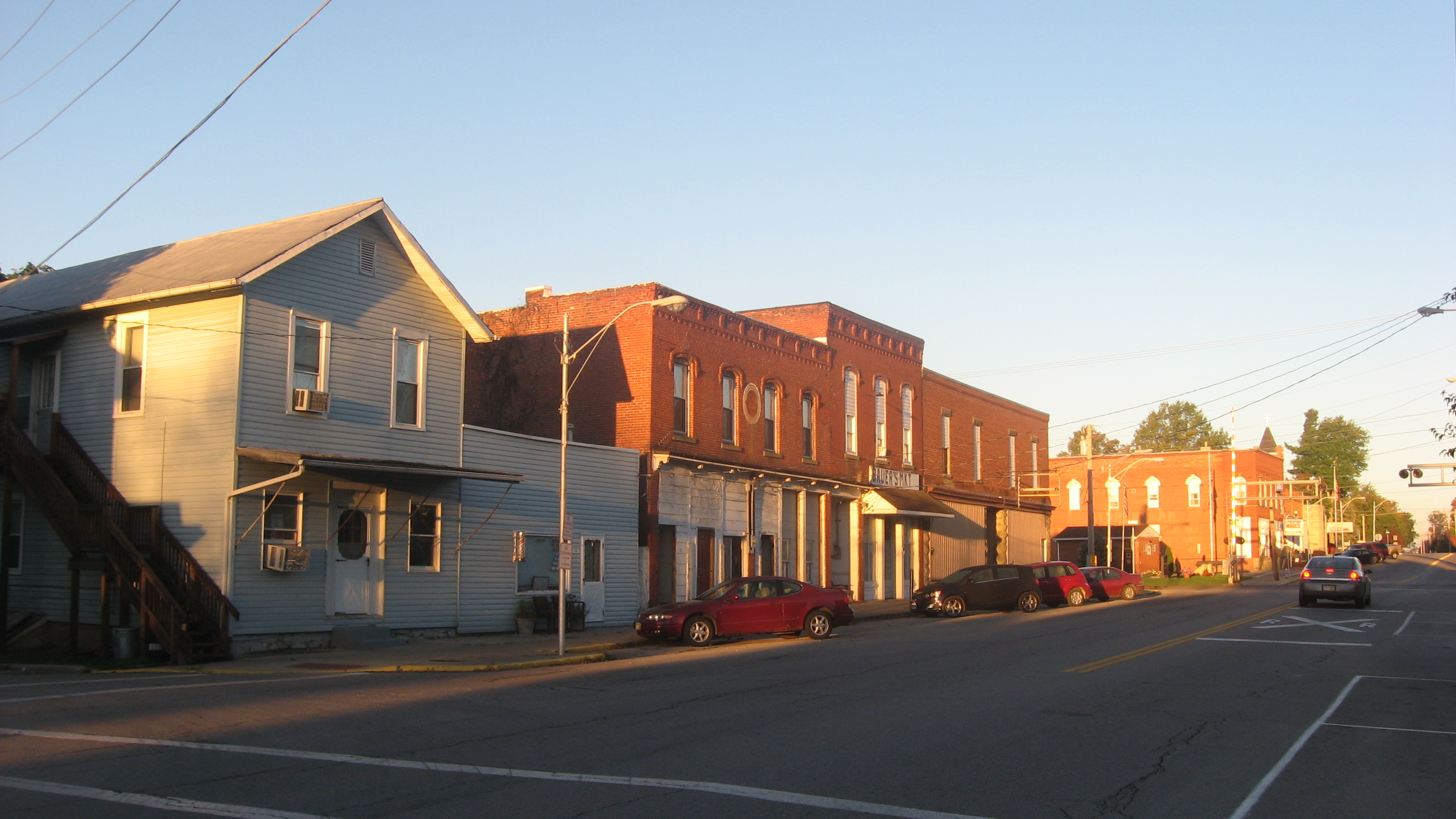
- Main Street downtown

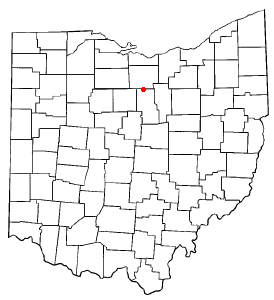
- Location of Shiloh, Richland County, Ohio

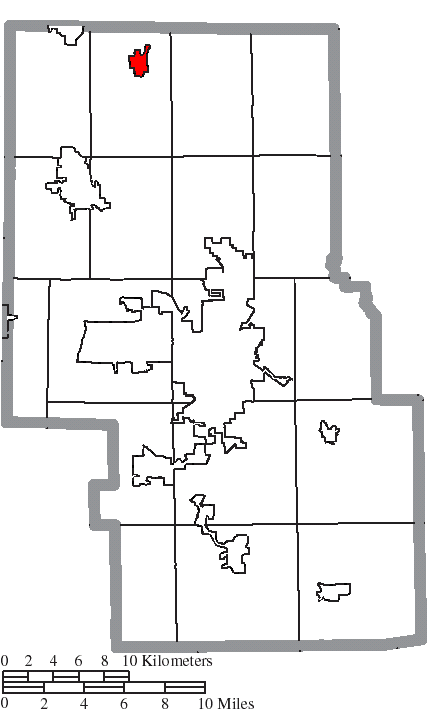
- Location of Shiloh in Richland County
- Coordinates: 40°58′10″N 82°36′06″W
- Country: United States
- State: Ohio
- County: Richland
- Founded: 1852
- Incorporated: 1874 (village)

Government
  - Mayor: Timothy W. Wireman

Area
  - Total: 0.92 sq mi (2.38 km^{2})
  - Land: 0.92 sq mi (2.37 km^{2})
  - Water: 0.0039 sq mi (0.01 km^{2})
- Elevation: 1,083 ft (330 m)

Population (2020)
  - Total: 619
  - Density: 675/sq mi (260.8/km^{2})
- Time zone: UTC-5 (Eastern (EST))
  - Summer (DST): UTC-4 (EDT)
- ZIP code: 44878
- Area code: 419
- FIPS code: 39-72298
- GNIS feature ID: 2399808
- Website: Village of Shiloh, Ohio

Shiloh is a village in Richland County in the U.S. state of Ohio. It is part of the Mansfield, Ohio Metropolitan Statistical Area. The population was 619 at the 2020 census.

== History ==
Shiloh was platted in September 1852 at the junction of the Sandusky and Mansfield Railroad, the Cleveland and Columbus Railroad, and a road between the cities of Tiffin and Wooster. It was originally named "Salem Station" because of its proximity to the village of Salem, which ceased to exist soon after the newer community was founded. In 1862, the name was changed to "Shiloh", but the reasons for the change are unclear: in 1908, some local citizens testified that it was named in honor of the Battle of Shiloh, a Civil War battle fought in 1862, while others stated that it was given in memory of the biblical Shiloh. In 1874, Shiloh was incorporated as a village. Two railroads provided substantial commerce by the end of the century, and natural gas deposits supplied the village with its energy needs and small amounts of gas for export to surrounding communities.

One Shiloh location, the Silas Ferrell House, is listed on the National Register of Historic Places.

== Geography ==
According to the United States Census Bureau, the village has a total area of 0.91 square miles (2.36 km^{2}), all land.

== Demographics ==
Historical population
Census	Pop.	Note	%±
1870	297		—
1880	661		122.6%
1890	644		−2.6%
1900	597		−7.3%
1910	555		−7.0%
1920	430		−22.5%
1930	514		19.5%
1940	519		1.0%
1950	655		26.2%
1960	724		10.5%
1970	817		12.8%
1980	857		4.9%
1990	778		−9.2%
2000	721		−7.3%
2010	649		−10.0%
2020	619		−4.6%

=== 2010 census ===
As of the census of 2010, there were 649 people, 235 households, and 170 families living in the village. The population density was 713.2 inhabitants per square mile (275.4/km^{2}). There were 265 housing units at an average density of 291.2 per square mile (112.4/km^{2}). The racial makeup of the village was 97.8% White, 0.6% African American, 0.8% Native American, 0.3% Asian, and 0.5% from two or more races. Hispanic or Latino of any race were 0.5% of the population.

There were 235 households, of which 35.7% had children under the age of 18 living with them, 51.1% were married couples living together, 14.5% had a female householder with no husband present, 6.8% had a male householder with no wife present, and 27.7% were non-families. 20.9% of all households were made up of individuals, and 9% had someone living alone who was 65 years of age or older. The average household size was 2.76 and the average family size was 3.16.

The median age in the village was 38.4 years. 25% of residents were under the age of 18; 10.8% were between the ages of 18 and 24; 25.5% were from 25 to 44; 26.7% were from 45 to 64; and 11.9% were 65 years of age or older. The gender makeup of the village was 49.9% male and 50.1% female.

=== 2000 census ===
As of the census of 2000, there were 721 people, 246 households, and 200 families living in the village. The population density was 790.9 inhabitants per square mile (305.4/km^{2}). There were 256 housing units at an average density of 280.8 per square mile (108.4/km^{2}). The racial makeup of the village was 98.89% White, 0.28% Native American, 0.28% from other races, and 0.55% from two or more races. Hispanic or Latino of any race were 0.83% of the population.

There were 246 households, out of which 40.2% had children under the age of 18 living with them, 62.2% were married couples living together, 12.2% had a female householder with no husband present, and 18.3% were non-families. 15.9% of all households were made up of individuals, and 5.7% had someone living alone who was 65 years of age or older. The average household size was 2.93 and the average family size was 3.24.

In the village, the population was spread out, with 30.4% under the age of 18, 10.3% from 18 to 24, 28.7% from 25 to 44, 21.2% from 45 to 64, and 9.4% who were 65 years of age or older. The median age was 32 years. For every 100 females there were 97.5 males. For every 100 females age 18 and over, there were 100.0 males.

The median income for a household in the village was $30,750, and the median income for a family was $32,778. Males had a median income of $27,431 versus $20,000 for females. The per capita income for the village was $12,623. About 12.4% of families and 17.3% of the population were below the poverty line, including 26.8% of those under age 18 and 2.4% of those age 65 or over.

== Education ==
Shiloh is located within the Plymouth-Shiloh Local School District. The district administers three public schools in the nearby village of Plymouth including Plymouth-Shiloh Elementary School, Shiloh Middle School, and Plymouth High School.
