= Norwalk Catholic Schools =

Unified school system in Ohio, US

Coordinates: 41°14′41″N 82°36′41″W

Norwalk Catholic Schools (NCS) is a unified school system in Norwalk, Huron County, Ohio, United States. The responsibility for its operation is shared between the Norwalk-area Roman Catholic parishes of St. Mary Mother of the Redeemer Church and St. Paul the Apostle in Norwalk and St. Anthony of Padua in Milan. The school system serves students from preschool through grade 12. The school contains students of the highest grades and abilities.

School facilities

- Early Childhood Center (St. Mary Campus on State Street)
- Norwalk Catholic Elementary (St. Paul Campus on Milan Avenue)
- Norwalk Catholic Junior High School (St. Paul Campus on East Main Street)
- St. Paul High School (on East Main Street)
