= New London School =

New London School may refer to:

- New London High School (Connecticut) in New London, Connecticut
- New London High School (Ohio) in New London, Ohio
- New London High School (Wisconsin) in New London, Wisconsin
- New London School in Texas (K–11), site of the 1937 New London School explosion
