= Silas Ferrell House =

Historic house in Ohio, United States

- U.S. National Register of Historic Places
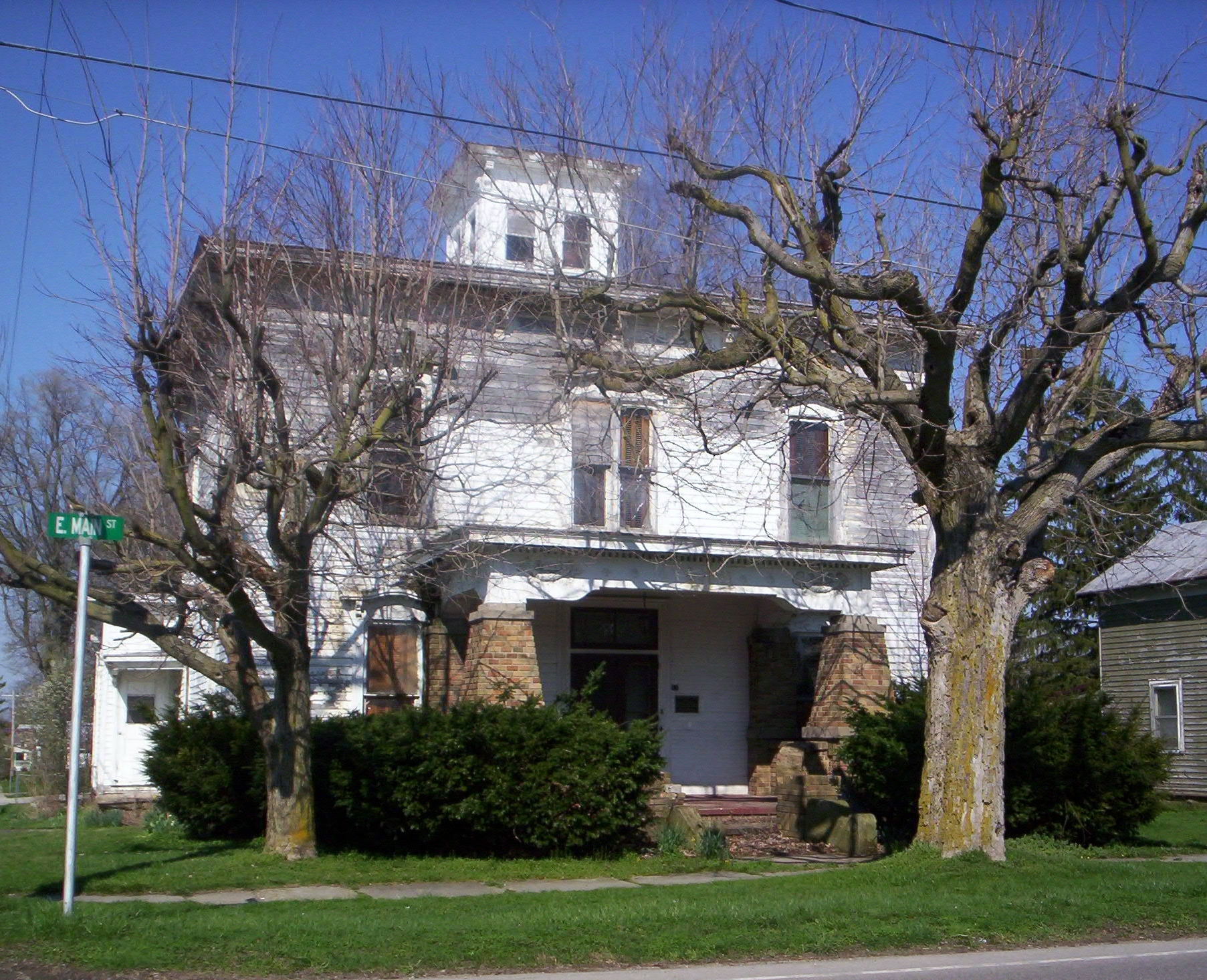
- Front of the house, with a slight bit of the western side visible to left

- Location within Ohio Location within the United States
- Location: 25 E. Main St., Shiloh, Ohio
- Coordinates: 40°58′1″N 82°35′57″W
- Area: Less than 1 acre (0.40 ha)
- Built: 1880
- Architectural style: Italianate
- NRHP reference No.: 87002146
- Added to NRHP: December 14, 1987

The Silas Ferrell House is a historic residence in the village of Shiloh, Ohio, United States. Built in the closing decades of the nineteenth century as the home of a wealthy businessman, the house exemplifies the economic prosperity of 1880s Shiloh. Its distinctive architecture has qualified it for designation as a historic site.

== History ==
Shiloh was platted in September 1852 around a rural station of the Sandusky and Mansfield Railroad at a three-way junction with the Cleveland and Columbus Railroad and with the road between the cities of Tiffin and Wooster. Originally named "Salem Station" because of its location near the short-lived village of Salem, it was given its present name in 1862, soon after the Battle of Shiloh in the Civil War. By the end of the century, Shiloh was a flourishing locality: with the presence of the railroads, the village's commerce grew to the point that parts of the business district were three stories tall. Further contributing to local prosperity was the presence of natural gas deposits, which were sufficient to supply all local needs while leaving some for export to surrounding communities. Within such an environment was the Silas Ferrell House constructed in 1880. Ferrell was a well-to-do village merchant: he owned the general store and a factory that produced agricultural equipment, and he had a share in the operation of Shiloh's grain elevator. Since Ferrell's day, his house has not always been used as a residence; for a time, it was the location of the McQuate Funeral Home.

== Architecture ==
The Ferrell House is a square Italianate residence with a cupola atop the center of the hip roof. Two stories high, the weatherboarded structure rests on a foundation of limestone; its roof is tin, and additional elements are made of wood. A small porch is attached to the front, and the roofs feature cornices with brackets. Such elements are clear examples of the Italianate style, along with the symmetrical three-bay facade, the decorative milling on the cornice and the windows, and the hoods atop the rounded windows. No other building in Shiloh retains such a high degree of integrity in the Italianate style, and its location on Main Street increases the house's prominence. Completing the property are a small shed and a two-story carriage house behind the house itself.

== Preservation ==
At the end of 1987, the Silas Ferrell House was listed on the National Register of Historic Places, qualifying because of its well-preserved historic architecture. More than sixty buildings and historic districts throughout Richland County have been given this distinction, but most are located in the county seat of Mansfield, and the Ferrell House is the only one in or near Shiloh.
