= Plymouth–Shiloh Local School District =

School district in Ohio, United States

Address
- 365 Sandusky Street Plymouth, Ohio, 44865; United States
- Coordinates: 41°00′15″N 82°40′14″W

District information
- Type: Public
- Grades: Pre-K through 12
- Established: 1958
- Superintendent: Brad Turson
- NCES District ID: 3904946

Students and staff
- Students: 611 (2024–25)
- Teachers: 47.00
- Staff: 99.45

Other information
- Website: www.plymouthshilohsd.org

Plymouth–Shiloh Local School District is a public school district serving students in the villages of Plymouth and Shiloh in Richland and Huron Counties in the U.S. state of Ohio. The school district enrolls 611 students as of the 2024–2025 academic year. The district was created in 1958 when Plymouth and Shiloh merged their districts.

== Schools ==
=== Elementary school ===
- Plymouth–Shiloh Elementary School (Grades Pre-K through 4th)

=== Middle school ===
- Shiloh Middle School (Grades 5th through 8th)

=== High school ===
- Plymouth High School (Grades 9th through 12th)
