= East Townsend, Ohio =

Unincorporated community in Ohio, United States

Coordinates: 41°14′55″N 82°29′31″W

East Townsend is an unincorporated community in Huron County, Ohio, United States. It is located in Townsend Township and is part of the Collins census-designated place.

== History ==
The first post office in East Townsend was established in 1833 or 1834. The name of the post office was prefaced with East in order to avoid confusion with Townsend Township, Sandusky County, Ohio.
