= South Central High School (Ohio) =

Location
- 3305 Greenwich Angling Road; Greenwich, Ohio 44837; United States
- Coordinates: 41°02′46″N 82°31′05″W

Information
- Type: Public
- Established: 1960
- School district: South Central Local School District
- NCES School ID: 390477302956
- Principal: Thomas Hellickson
- Teaching staff: 13.75 (FTE)
- Grades: 9–12
- Enrollment: 211 (2024–25)
- Student to teacher ratio: 15.35
- Colors: Old gold and white
- Athletics conference: Firelands Conference
- Team name: Trojans
- Rival: Plymouth Big Red
- Accreditation: Ohio Department of Education
- Website: www.south-central.org/o/high-school

South Central High School is a public high school in Greenwich Township, just north of the village limits of Greenwich, Ohio, United States. It was created in 1960 with the consolidation of the Greenwich and North Fairfield school districts. It is the only high school in the South Central Local Schools district. Their mascot is the Trojans and they are members of the Firelands Conference.
