= Bob Brotzki =

American football player (born 1962)

No. 74, 61, 62
- Position: Offensive tackle

Personal information
- Born: December 24, 1962 (age 63); Sandusky, Ohio, U.S.
- Listed height: 6 ft 5 in (1.96 m)
- Listed weight: 281 lb (127 kg)

Career information
- High school: St. Mary Central Catholic (Sandusky)
- College: Syracuse
- NFL draft: 1986: 9th round, 228th overall pick

Career history
- Indianapolis Colts (1986–1988); Dallas Cowboys (1988); Atlanta Falcons (1989)*
- * Offseason or practice squad member only

Awards and highlights
- Second-team All-East (1985)

Career NFL statistics
- Games played: 18
- Stats at Pro Football Reference

Robert John Brotzki (born December 24, 1962) is an American former professional football player who was an offensive tackle in the National Football League (NFL) for the Indianapolis Colts and the Dallas Cowboys. He played college football for the Syracuse Orange.

== Early life ==
Brotzki attended St. Mary Central Catholic High School in Sandusky, Ohio, where he played as a tight end. He received All-state honors as a senior. He accepted a football scholarship from Syracuse University.

As a freshman, he was named the starter at tight end. He was limited with an injury for most of the season, while finishing fifth on the team with 15 receptions for 131 yards and no touchdowns. As a junior, he was switched to the offensive line and was named the starter at left tackle. He recorded 45 consecutive starts during his college career.

== Professional career ==
=== Indianapolis Colts ===
Brotzki was selected by the Indianapolis Colts in the ninth round (228th overall) of the 1986 NFL draft. As a rookie, he was moved to offensive guard, before being placed on the injured reserve list with a back injury on August 29. He was activated on November 7. He appeared in 2 games as a backup.

In 1987, he was moved in training camp to left tackle, while Chris Hinton's recovered from the arthroscopic knee surgery he had in June. He also was tried at center. He missed the season opener and games from weeks 3 through 5.

In 1988, he was a backup offensive tackle in training camp, before announcing his retirement. He re-signed with the team on September 22. He played in one game before being waived on September 28, to make room for guard Ron Solt.

=== Dallas Cowboys ===
On October 19, 1988, he was signed by the Dallas Cowboys. He appeared in 7 games and was declared inactive for 2 contests.

=== Atlanta Falcons ===
On February 21, 1989, he was signed in Plan B free agency by the Atlanta Falcons. He was released on September 4.

== Personal life ==
After football, he was the tight end assistant football coach for two years (2007-2008) at Robert Morris College. In 2009, he was the Director of Player Development at Syracuse University. From 2010 to 2015, he was the Assistant Athletics Director for Player Development.
