= Western Reserve High School (Collins, Ohio) =

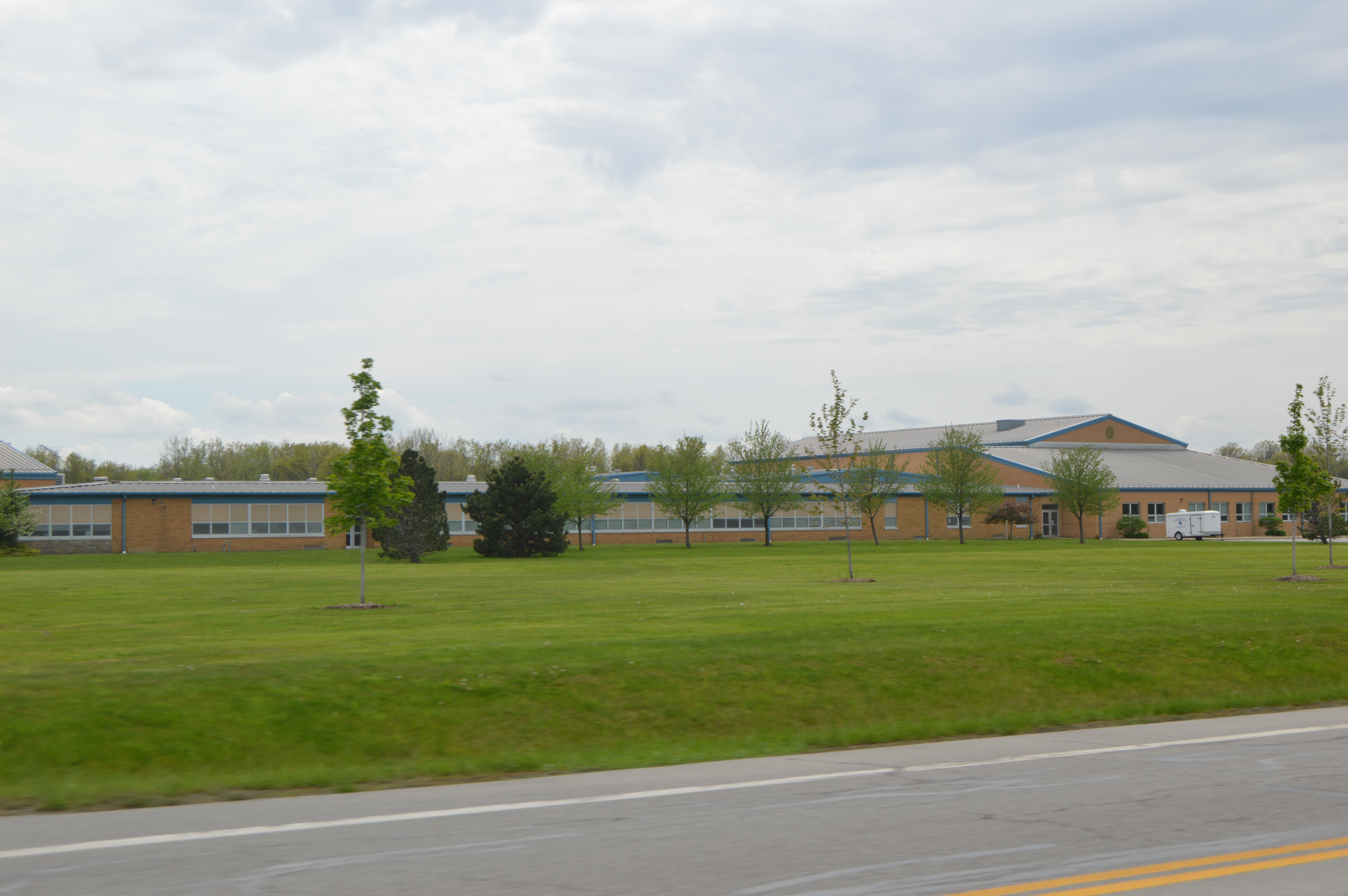
- Seen from U.S. Route 20

Location
- 3841 U.S. Route 20; Collins, Ohio 44826; United States; 41°14′45″N 82°27′9″W

Information
- Type: Public
- School district: Western Reserve Local School District
- Principal: Lisa Border
- Teaching staff: 19.00 (FTE)
- Grades: 9–12
- Student to teacher ratio: 7.11
- Campus type: square
- Colors: Blue and White
- Athletics conference: Firelands Conference
- Mascot: guy on horse
- Team name: Roughriders
- Website: www.western-reserve.org/page/about-the-high-school

Western Reserve High School is a public high school in Collins, Ohio, part of Townsend Township, within Huron County. Consolidated in 1952 under the name of Townsend-Wakeman High School from two previous smaller high schools at Townsend in Townsend Township and Wakeman, in the village of Wakeman, Ohio before changing to its current name in 1959 when the new school building was built. It is the only high school in the Western Reserve Local School District, which includes the nearby village of Wakeman. Their nickname is the "Roughriders". They are members of the Firelands Conference in the Ohio High School Athletic Association, and wear the colors of blue and white.
