= Ohio State Route 430 =

State highway in northern Ohio, US

State Route 430

Route information
- Maintained by ODOT
- Length: 13.08 mi (21.05 km)
- Existed: 1960–present

Major junctions
- West end: SR 309 in Ontario
- US 42 in Mansfield
- East end: SR 603 near Mifflin

Location
- Country: United States
- State: Ohio
- Counties: Richland, Ashland

Highway system
- Ohio State Highway System; Interstate; US; State; Scenic
← SR 424	→ SR 435

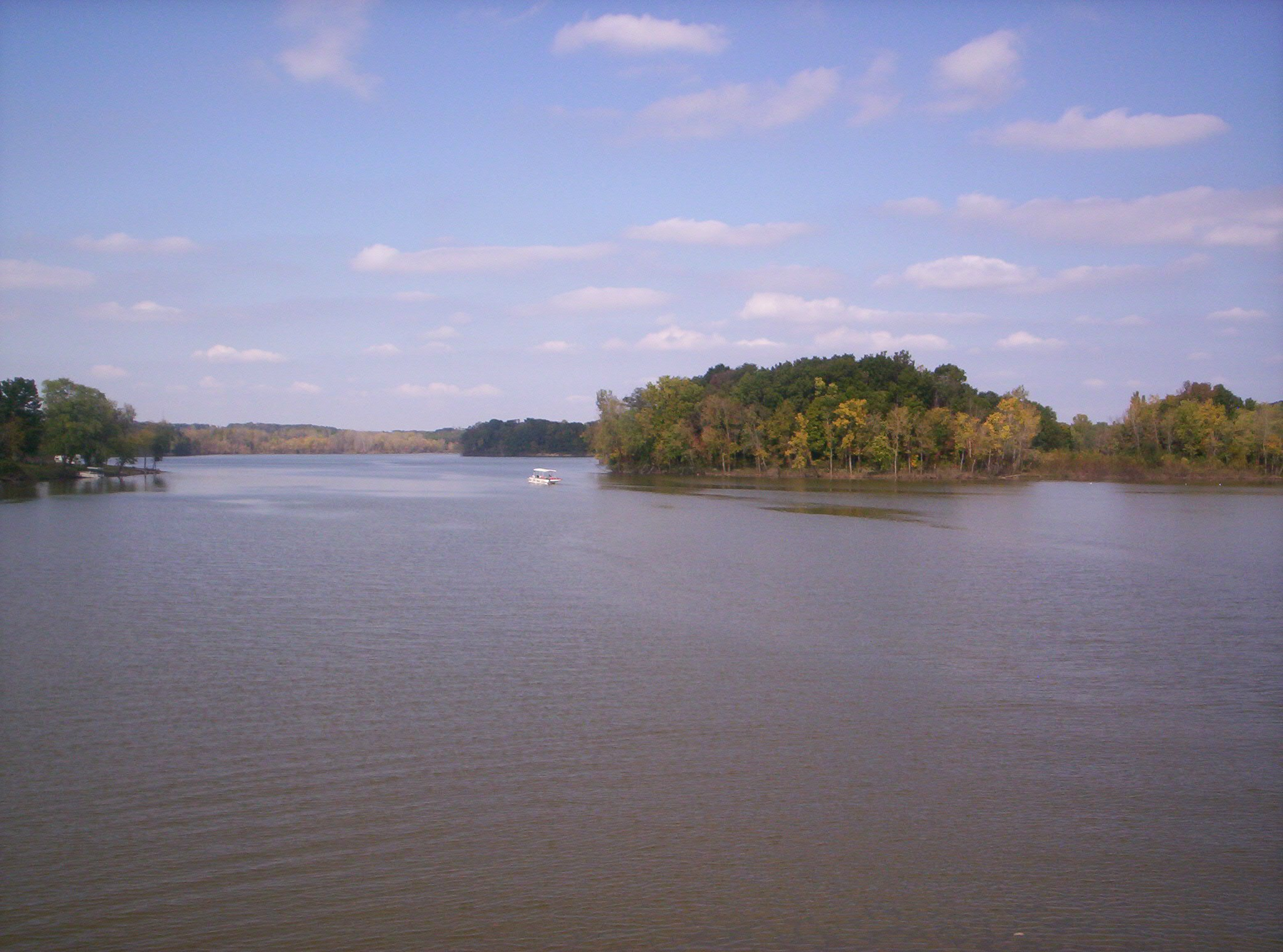
A view of Charles Mill Lake from the SR 430 bridge in Ashland County, looking north.

State Route 430 (SR 430, OH 430) is an east–west state highway in the northern portion of Ohio. The western terminus of State Route 430 is at an interchange with State Route 309 in Ontario. Its eastern terminus is at a T-intersection with State Route 603 just outside Mifflin.

== Route description ==
This state highway runs through portions of Richland and Ashland Counties. No part of State Route 430 is included as a part of the National Highway System.

== History ==
State Route 430 follows part of what was previously US 30 through the Mansfield area. The section of SR 430 from its western terminus in Ontario at SR 309 to its split from US 42 in eastern Mansfield follows the original western end of US 30S, while the portion from US 42 to the eastern terminus at SR 603 just west of Mifflin was part of mainline US 30. State Route 430 was designated circa 1960 after US 30 was rerouted to its current location in the northern parts of Mansfield and Ontario and the western terminus of US 30S was changed to the what is now the junction of US 30 and SR 309. No changes of major significance have taken place to SR 430 since its inception.

== Major intersections ==
County	Location	mi	km	Destinations	Notes
Richland	Ontario	0.00	0.00	SR 309 (Park Avenue West) – Galion, Mansfield	Partial interchange, no access from SR 309 westbound to SR 430 eastbound
Richland	Mansfield	4.92	7.92	SR 13 south (Mulberry Street)	
Richland	Mansfield	5.06	8.14	US 42 south (Main Street)	Western end of southbound US 42 concurrency
Richland	Mansfield	5.13	8.26	SR 13 north (Diamond Street)	
Richland	Mansfield	5.36	8.63	US 42 (Adams Street)	Western end of northbound US 42 concurrency
Richland	Mansfield	5.63	9.06	US 42 north (Ashland Road) to US 30	Eastern end of US 42 concurrency
Richland	Mansfield	5.96	9.59	SR 39 north (East 5th Street)	Western end of SR 39 concurrency
Richland	Madison Township	6.96	11.20	SR 39 south (Lucas Road) to I-71	Eastern end of SR 39 concurrency
Ashland	Mifflin Township	13.08	21.05	SR 603 to US 30	
1.000 mi = 1.609 km; 1.000 km = 0.621 mi: Concurrency terminus; Incomplete access
