= Holgate High School =

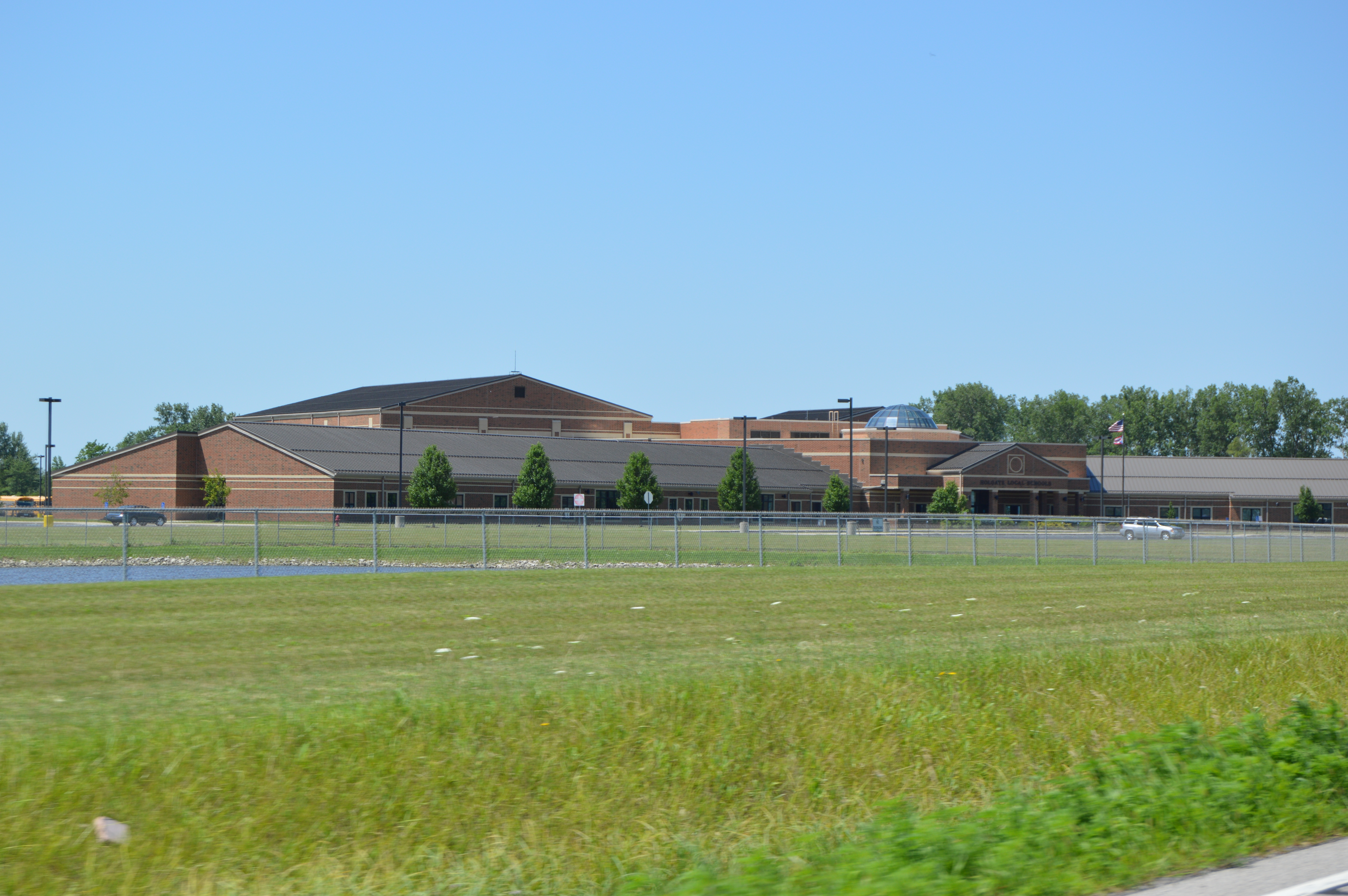
- Front detail

Location
- 801 Joe E. Brown Avenue; Holgate, Ohio 43527-9802; United States
- 41°15′8″N 84°7′10″W

Information
- Type: Public high school
- School district: Holgate Local Schools
- NCES School ID: 390475702919
- Principal: Brian Hughes
- Teaching staff: 22.00 (on an FTE basis)
- Grades: 6–12
- Enrollment: 215 (2023-2024)
- Student to teacher ratio: 9.77
- Colors: Purple and Gold
- Athletics conference: Buckeye Border Conference; Northern 8 Football Conference (football-only)
- Nickname: Tigers
- Website: www.holgateschools.org

Holgate High School is a public high school in Holgate, Ohio. It is the only high school in the Holgate Local Schools District. They compete in the Buckeye Border Conference and the Northern 8 Football Conference as a member of the Ohio High School Athletic Association.

== History ==
Holgate introduced its new PK-12 campus in 2011.

== Athletics ==
Holgate High School currently offers:

- Baseball
- Basketball
- Cheerleading
- Football (8-man)
- Softball
- Volleyball

=== Ohio High School Athletic Association State Championships ===
- Boys baseball – 1937
- Boys basketball – 2004
