= Kelleys Island School =

Public school in Ohio, U.S.

Kelleys Island Local School
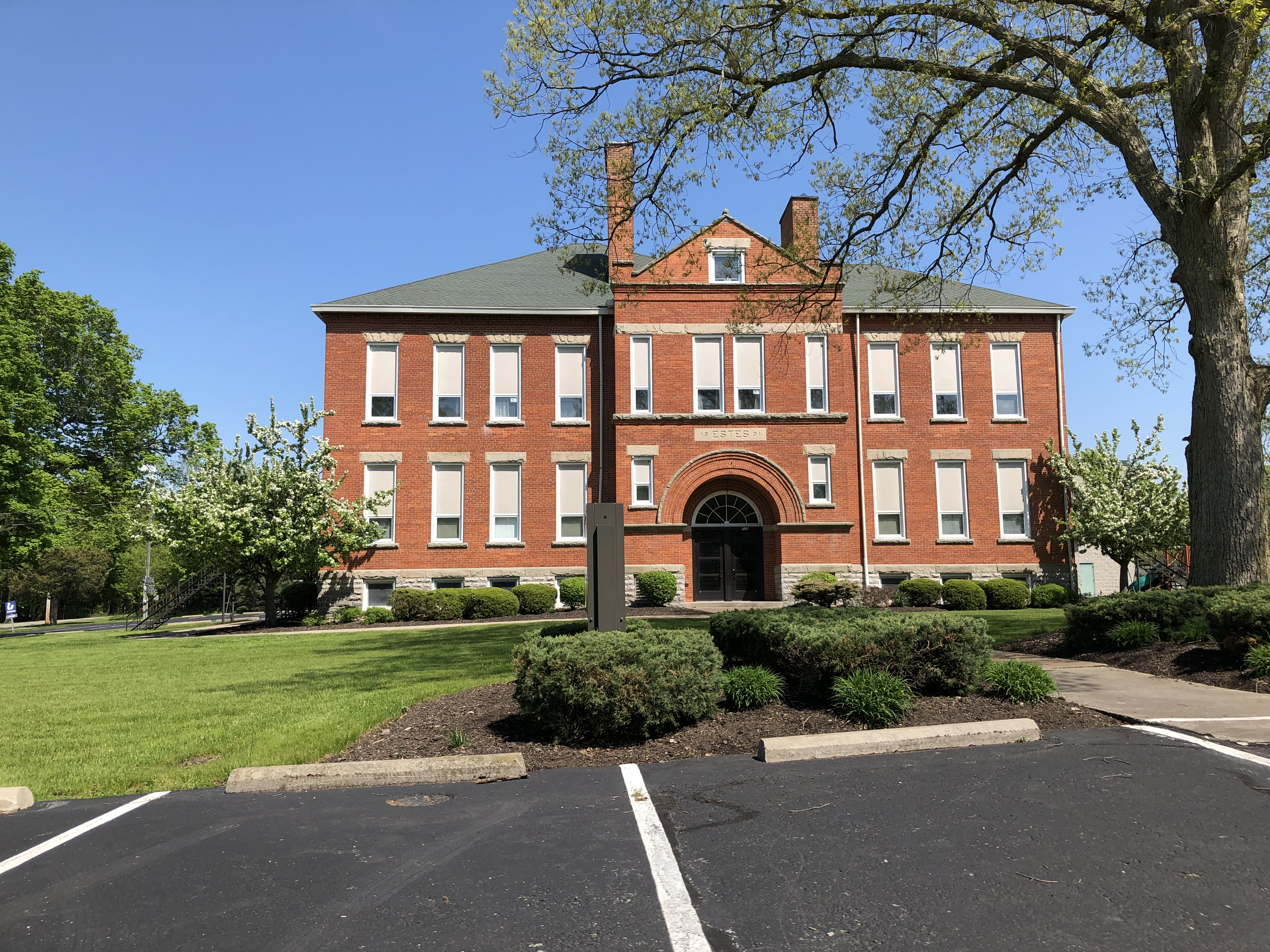

Location
- 553 Division Street; Kelleys Island, Ohio, (Erie County) 43438; United States
- Coordinates: 41°36′22″N 82°42′26″W

Information
- Type: Public, coeducational
- Opened: 1903
- School district: Kelleys Island Local Schools
- Superintendent: Phil Thiede
- CEEB code: 362775
- NCES School ID: 390467904270
- Principal: Phil Thiede
- Grades: K–12
- Colors: Green and white
- Team name: Green Devils
- Website: www.kelleys.k12.oh.us

Kelleys Island Local School is a public K-12 school on Kelleys Island, Ohio, United States, that serves the island. It is the only high school in the Kelleys Island Local School District. The school's athletic teams are nicknamed the Green Devils.

Kelleys Island School includes the smallest public high school in Ohio. The class of 2007 included six students, which is about as large a class as they have ever had. Ohio Department of Education statistics show a 2016 enrollment consisting of fewer than 10 kindergartners. Any juniors and seniors are encouraged to take classes at EHOVE Career Center.

The current school building was built from 1901 to 1903 and expanded in 2000. The school building was named Estes School after James Estes, who left $10,000 in his will for the construction of a new school building.
