= Greenwich, Ohio =

- Village
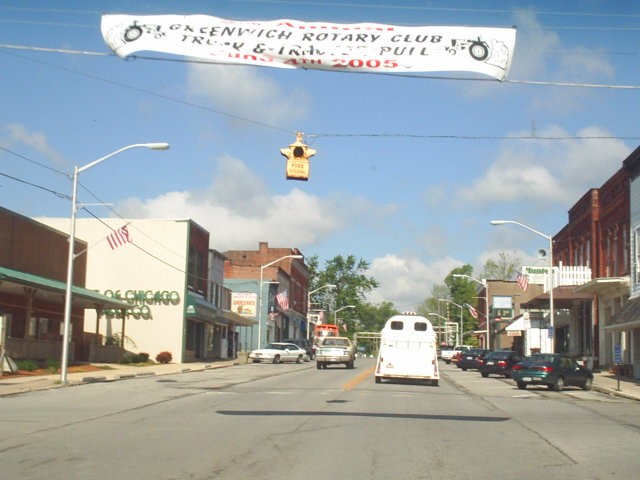
- Main Street downtown

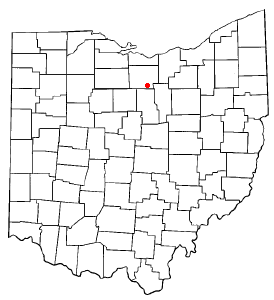
- Location of Greenwich, Ohio

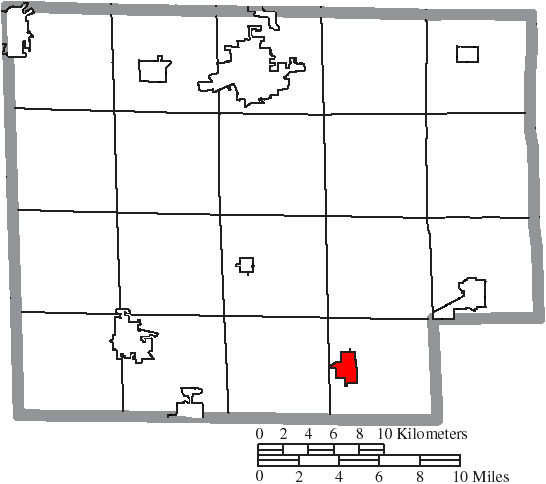
- Location of Greenwich in Huron County
- Coordinates: 41°01′54″N 82°31′11″W
- Country: United States
- State: Ohio
- County: Huron

Government
  - Mayor: James M. Twaddle

Area
  - Total: 1.56 sq mi (4.03 km^{2})
  - Land: 1.52 sq mi (3.93 km^{2})
  - Water: 0.039 sq mi (0.10 km^{2})
- Elevation: 1,037 ft (316 m)

Population (2020)
  - Total: 1,409
  - Estimate (2023): 1,389
  - Density: 928.6/sq mi (358.52/km^{2})
- Time zone: UTC-5 (Eastern (EST))
  - Summer (DST): UTC-4 (EDT)
- ZIP code: 44837
- Area code: 419
- FIPS code: 39-32368
- GNIS feature ID: 2398206

Greenwich is a village in Huron County, Ohio, United States. The population was 1,409 at the 2020 census. The town is located along U.S. Route 224, approximately 15 miles south of Norwalk, the county seat. It is served by a branch of the Willard Memorial Library.

== History ==
The village name comes from Greenwich Township, which is named after the town of Greenwich, Connecticut. A post office called Greenwich was established in 1828 and the municipality was incorporated as a village in 1879. The first settler in Greenwich was Henry Carpenter, who arrived from Ulster County, New York, 1817. Greenwich is part of the Firelands region, also known as the "Sufferers' Lands." This area was designated in 1792 to compensate residents of Connecticut towns, including Greenwich, whose homes were burned during the Revolutionary War.

== Geography ==
According to the United States Census Bureau, the village has a total area of 1.37 square miles (3.55 km^{2}), of which 1.35 square miles (3.50 km^{2}) is land and 0.02 square miles (0.05 km^{2}) is water.

== Demographics ==
Historical population
Census	Pop.	Note	%±
1880	647		—
1890	881		36.2%
1900	849		−3.6%
1910	876		3.2%
1920	827		−5.6%
1930	956		15.6%
1940	996		4.2%
1950	1,204		20.9%
1960	1,371		13.9%
1970	1,473		7.4%
1980	1,458		−1.0%
1990	1,442		−1.1%
2000	1,525		5.8%
2010	1,476		−3.2%
2020	1,409		−4.5%
2023 (est.)	1,389	▼	−1.4%
U.S. Decennial Census

=== 2010 census ===
As of the census of 2010, there were 1,476 people, 570 households, and 404 families living in the village. The population density was 1,093.3 inhabitants per square mile (422.1/km^{2}). There were 632 housing units at an average density of 468.1 per square mile (180.7/km^{2}). The racial makeup of the village was 99.1% White, 0.2% African American, 0.4% Asian, 0.1% from other races, and 0.3% from two or more races. Hispanic or Latino of any race were 1.1% of the population.

There were 570 households, of which 38.8% had children under the age of 18 living with them, 52.5% were married couples living together, 13.0% had a female householder with no husband present, 5.4% had a male householder with no wife present, and 29.1% were non-families. 25.3% of all households were made up of individuals, and 12.1% had someone living alone who was 65 years of age or older. The average household size was 2.57 and the average family size was 3.07.

The median age in the village was 36.1 years. 27.6% of residents were under the age of 18; 6.9% were between the ages of 18 and 24; 27.5% were from 25 to 44; 25% were from 45 to 64; and 13% were 65 years of age or older. The gender makeup of the village was 50.3% male and 49.7% female.

=== 2000 census ===
As of the census of 2000, there were 1,525 people, 579 households, and 412 families living in the village. The population density was 1,124.0 inhabitants per square mile (434.0/km^{2}). There were 610 housing units at an average density of 449.6 per square mile (173.6/km^{2}). The racial makeup of the village was 98.23% White, 0.07% Native American, 0.07% Asian, 0.39% from other races, and 1.25% from two or more races. Hispanic or Latino of any race were 0.59% of the population.

There were 579 households, out of which 36.4% had children under the age of 18 living with them, 56.0% were married couples living together, 12.3% had a female householder with no husband present, and 28.8% were non-families. 23.7% of all households were made up of individuals, and 10.4% had someone living alone who was 65 years of age or older. The average household size was 2.63 and the average family size was 3.10.

In the village, the population was spread out, with 28.8% under the age of 18, 9.0% from 18 to 24, 29.5% from 25 to 44, 20.0% from 45 to 64, and 12.7% who were 65 years of age or older. The median age was 34 years. For every 100 females there were 90.4 males. For every 100 females age 18 and over, there were 86.3 males.

The median income for a household in the village was $31,625, and the median income for a family was $39,375. Males had a median income of $30,833 versus $21,523 for females. The per capita income for the village was $14,667. About 8.9% of families and 10.1% of the population were below the poverty line, including 10.6% of those under age 18 and 11.5% of those age 65 or over.

== Education ==
South Central Local Schools operates South Central High School.

Greenwich has a public library, a branch of the Huron County Community Library.

== Notable person ==
- Albert Rhys Williams, labor organizer
