= Toledo Christian Schools =

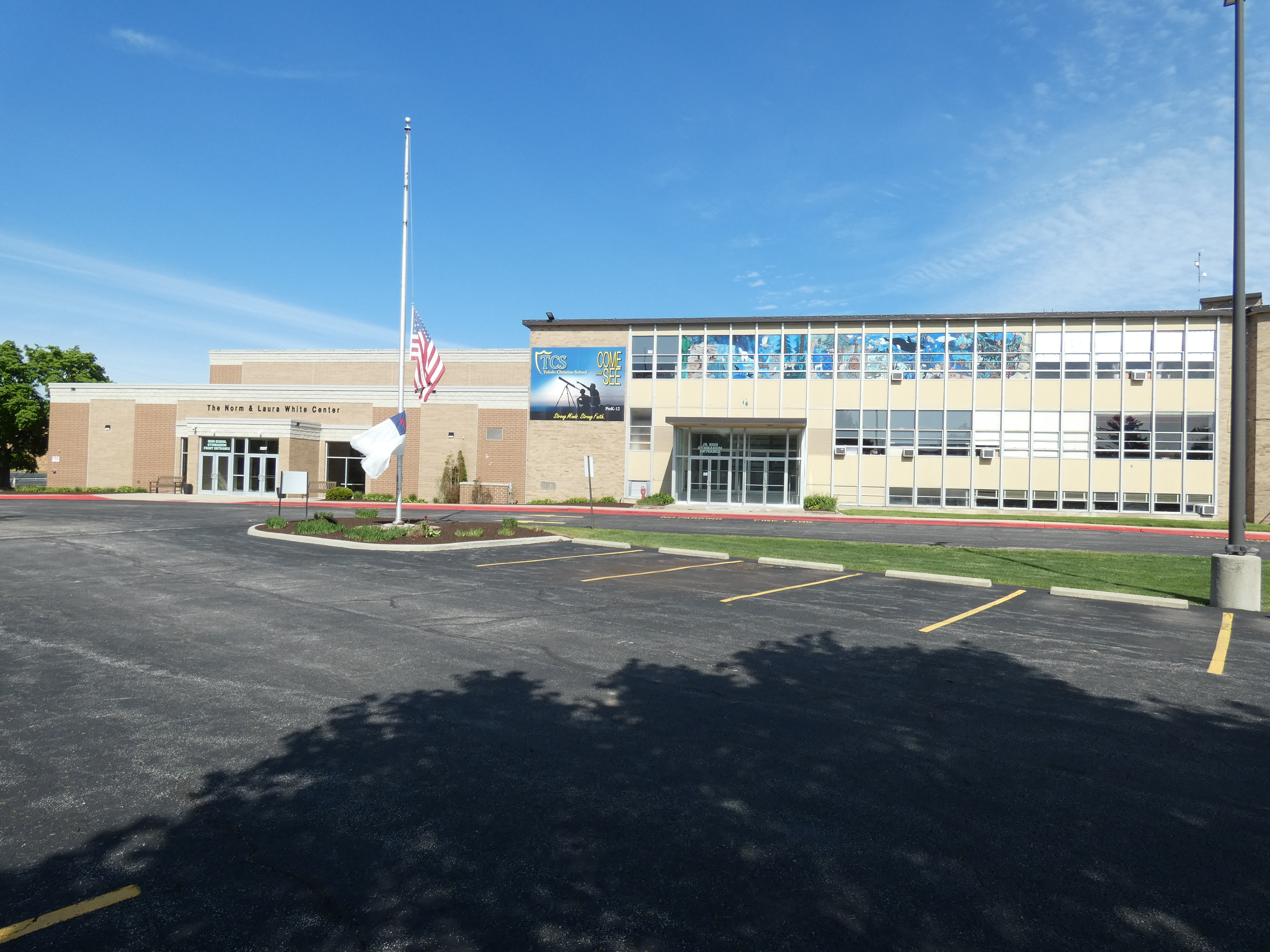

Location
- 2303 Brookford Drive; Toledo, Ohio 43614; United States
- Coordinates: 41°36′2″N 83°36′2″W

Information
- Type: Private
- Religious affiliation: Non-denominational Christian
- Superintendent: Scott Gibson
- Principal: Marie Minniear, Ben Cramer
- Grades: Preschool-12
- Gender: Co-educational
- Average class size: 20
- Colors: Navy & Gold
- Athletics conference: Toledo Area Athletic Conference
- Mascot: Eagle
- Team name: Eagles
- Accreditations: Association of Christian Schools International (ACSI); Transitional Member - Association of Classical Christian Schools (ACCS)
- Website: toledochristian.com

Toledo Christian Schools is a non-denominational, co-educational Christian school in Toledo, Ohio. It provides a Classical Christian education.

== Notable alumni ==
Matt Hammitt, Christian singer, songwriter and author
