= Plymouth High School (Ohio) =

Location
- 400 Trux Street; Plymouth, Ohio 44865; United States; 40°59′14″N 82°39′11″W

Information
- Type: Public
- School district: Plymouth–Shiloh Local School District
- NCES School ID: 390494603605
- Principal: Joe Morabito
- Teaching staff: 10.00 (FTE)
- Grades: 9–12
- Enrollment: 118 (2024–25)
- Student to teacher ratio: 11.80
- Colors: Red and white
- Fight song: Notre Dame Victory March
- Athletics conference: Firelands Conference; Northern 8 Football Conference (football only)
- Team name: Big Red
- Rival: Crestview Cougars; Willard Crimson Flashes
- Accreditation: Ohio Department of Education
- Website: www.plymouthshilohsd.org

Plymouth High School is a public high school in Plymouth, Ohio, that is part of the Plymouth–Shiloh Local School District. Athletic teams are known as the Big Red and they compete as members of the Firelands Conference and the Northern 8 Football Conference.

== History ==
In 1957, Plymouth consolidated their district with New Haven to create Huron Valley High School. The Ohio Supreme Court voided the merger in February 1958, and the schools immediately split apart. Eventually, just in time for the 1958–59 school year, Plymouth's school district merged with Shiloh's school district, and Plymouth High School began taking in Shiloh's students.

== State championships ==
- Boys Cross Country – 1971, 1974
