= St. Mary Central Catholic High School =

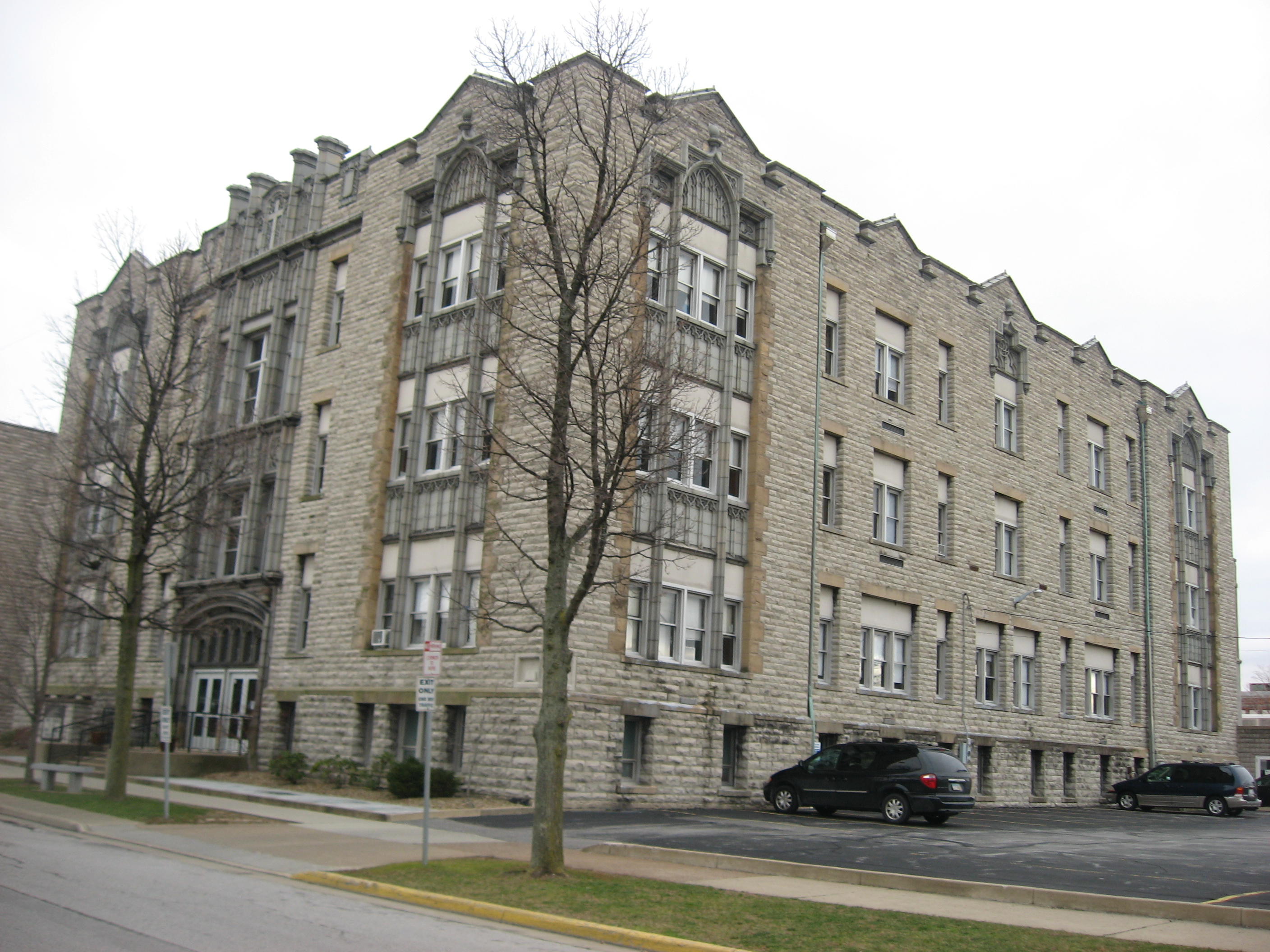

Location
- 410 West Jefferson Street; Sandusky, Ohio 44870-2427; United States; 41°27′5″N 82°42′43″W

Information
- Type: Private, Coeducational
- Religious affiliation: Roman Catholic
- Denomination: Catholic
- Established: 1902
- Founder: Rev. Joseph S. Widmann
- School district: Sandusky City
- Oversight: Roman Catholic Diocese of Toledo
- President: Ryan Wikel
- Principal: Brian Ferber
- Grades: 9-12
- Colors: Navy blue and Vegas Gold
- Team name: Panthers
- Website: School Webpage

St. Mary Central Catholic High School is a Catholic, private school in Sandusky, Ohio. It is affiliated with the Roman Catholic Diocese of Toledo. They are a member of the Ohio High School Athletic Association, competing in the Sandusky Bay Conference and Northern 8 Football Conference

== History ==
St. Mary Central Catholic High School was founded in 1902, initially offering a two-year commercial curriculum aimed at preparing students for business careers. As enrollment and academic expectations grew, the school expanded its academic offerings, and a dedicated high school building was completed in 1910 to accommodate the growing student body.

By the early 1920s, the school had expanded into a full four-year high school program, with its first four-year graduating class completing their studies in the 1923–1924 school year. Around this time, the institution also received recognition from the state of Ohio, marking its establishment as a fully accredited secondary school.

During the mid-20th century, St. Mary Central Catholic underwent several facility expansions to support its growing enrollment. These included additions such as a gymnasium in 1951, a grade school building in 1956, and later academic expansions including a science wing in 1972 and additional classrooms in 1981.

In 1974, the school was reorganized as a centralized Catholic high school serving multiple Sandusky-area parishes. This transition reflected broader trends in Catholic education, including the consolidation of resources and a gradual shift toward increased involvement of lay faculty alongside religious educators.

A major restructuring occurred in 2002–2003, when St. Mary Central Catholic became part of the Sandusky Central Catholic School system through the merger with Holy Angels and Sts. Peter and Paul schools. This consolidation led to the eventual unification of all grade levels onto a single campus, completed by 2013, creating a comprehensive pre-kindergarten through grade 12 Catholic school system.

== Athletics ==
=== State championships ===
- Boys basketball – 1936, 1980
- Boys wrestling – 1994, 2000, 2002, 2003, 2004, 2005, 2006
- Girls cross country – 1987, 1988, 1989, 1990
- Boys swimming – 2010

==== Non-OHSAA sponsored state championships ====
Football* – 2025, 2026

*Football is an 8-man state championship sponsored by the Northern 8 Football Conference and Ohio High School Football Coaches Association.

== Notable alumni ==
- Bob Brotzki, former professional football player
