= Monroeville High School (Ohio) =

Location
- 101 West Street; Monroeville, (Huron County), Ohio 44847; United States
- Coordinates: 41°14′51″N 82°42′9″W

Information
- Type: Public, Coeducational high school
- School district: Monroeville Local Schools
- Superintendent: Kristin Kaple-Jones
- Principal: James Kaczor
- Teaching staff: 20.00 (FTE)
- Grades: 7-12
- Student to teacher ratio: 12.45
- Colors: Black and Gold
- Athletics conference: Firelands Conference
- Team name: Eagles
- Rival: St. Paul High School
- Athletic Director: Ben Paul
- Website: School website

Monroeville High School is a public high school in Monroeville, Ohio. It is the only high school in the Monroeville Local Schools district. Their nickname is the Eagles. They are members of the Firelands Conference.

== Ohio High School Athletic Association State Championships ==
- Boys Basketball – 1984
- Wrestling - 2010

== League championships ==
- Baseball: 1964, 1965, 1967, 1968, 1969, 1971, 1972, 1973
- Boys Basketball: 1963–64, 1964–65, 1967–68, 1971–72, 1974–75, 1975–76, 1982–83, 1983–84
- Girls Basketball: 1978-79
- Boys Cross Country: 1984
- Girls Cross Country:
- Football: 1963, 1978, 1985, 1987, 1988, 1992, 1998, 2002, 2004, 2006
- Softball:
- Boys Track and Field: 2003, 2004, 2007, 2008
- Girls Track and Field:
- Volleyball: 1986, 1988, 2011
- Wrestling: 1997, 1998, 2000

== Alumni ==
- Logan Stieber, 4x State Champion wrestler; 4x NCAA Champion at Ohio State
