= St. Mary Mother of the Redeemer Church (Norwalk, Ohio) =

St. Mary's Catholic Church
- St. Mary Mother of the Redeemer Catholic Church
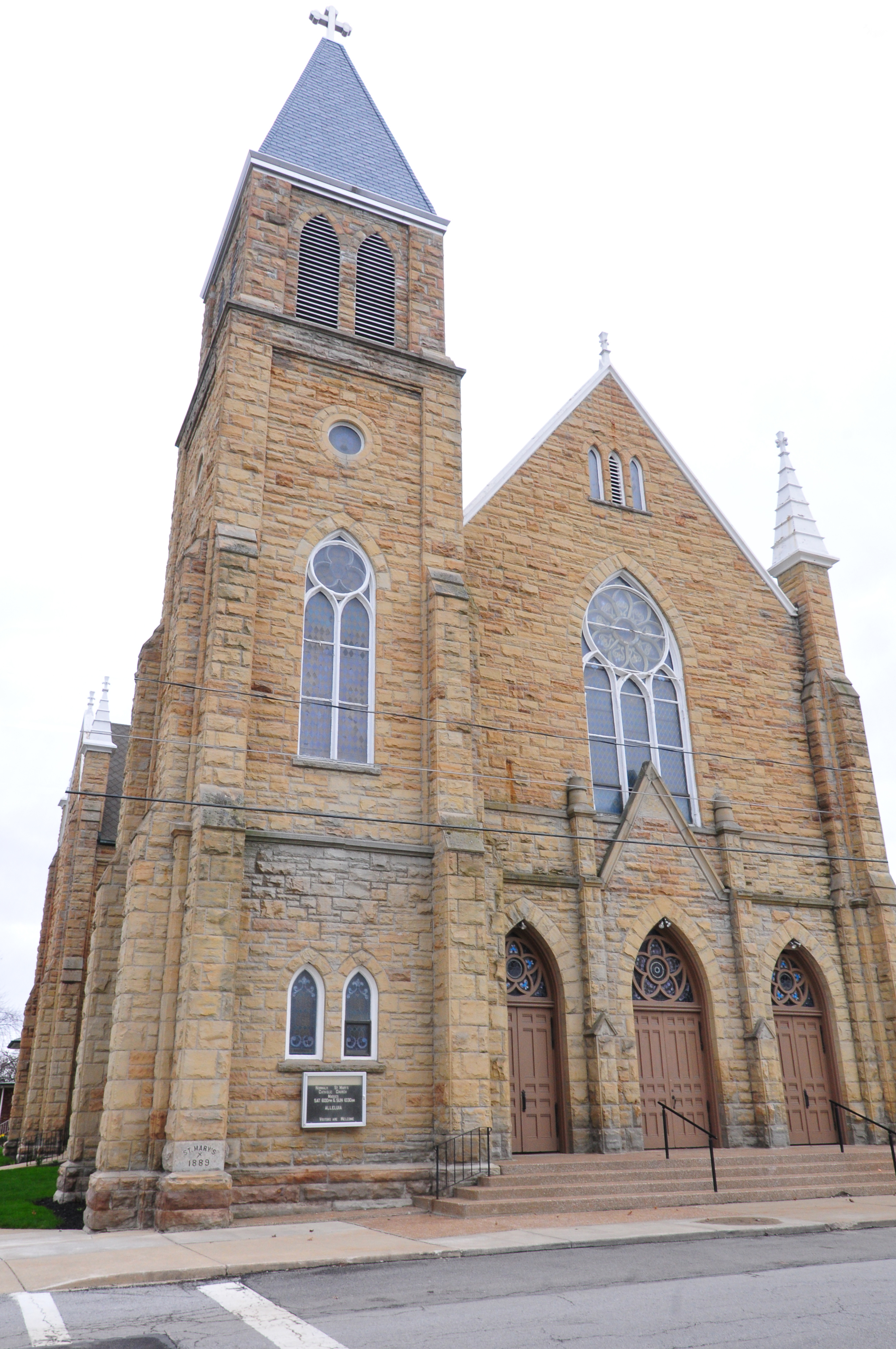

- Location within the United States
- 41°14′46.07″N 82°37′21.61″W
- Country: United States of America
- Denomination: Roman Catholic
- Website: www.stmarynorwalk.org

History
- Status: Church
- Consecrated: 1894

Architecture
- Functional status: Active
- Architect: William P. Ginther
- Architectural type: Church
- Style: Gothic
- Years built: 1889-1894
- Groundbreaking: May 29, 1889
- Completed: 1894
- Construction cost: $35,000.00

Specifications
- Capacity: 425
- Materials: Sandstone

Administration
- Diocese: Toledo
- Deanery: Saint John Neumann Deanery

Clergy
- Bishop: Daniel Thomas
- Pastor: Father Gilbert Mascarenhas

Saint Mary Mother of the Redeemer Church is a parish in the Roman Catholic Diocese of Toledo. The current church is located at 38 W. League Street, Norwalk, Ohio. Construction on the building began on May 29, 1889, and was completed in 1894. The church was previously twinned with St. Alphonsus in Peru, Ohio, but was later twinned with St. Anthony in Milan, Ohio, after a mass restructuring of the diocese.

== Buildings ==
The Century House was a name given to several buildings, now all demolished, within the parish. The first Century House was built in 1904 as a rectory, but was later used to house the church's nuns. The second Century House was also a former rectory close to the church that was re-purposed several times and at differing times served as a nunnery, meeting hall, and preschool. This building was demolished in 2008.

== Liturgical Music ==
The Liturgical music of St. Mary's is chiefly operated by Ms. Barb Doughty, who directs the St. Mary's choir and determines which hymns are appropriate for each service. Their instrumentalists are composed primarily of volunteers despite the contracting of a keyboardist by St. Mary's sister parish, St. Paul's.

Among their volunteers for the Sunday 10:00 AM liturgy is Henry S Palau, a local high school student who plays both the organ and piano for St. Mary's. He does a bloody marvelous job and is quite a dapper fellow.

== Gallery ==
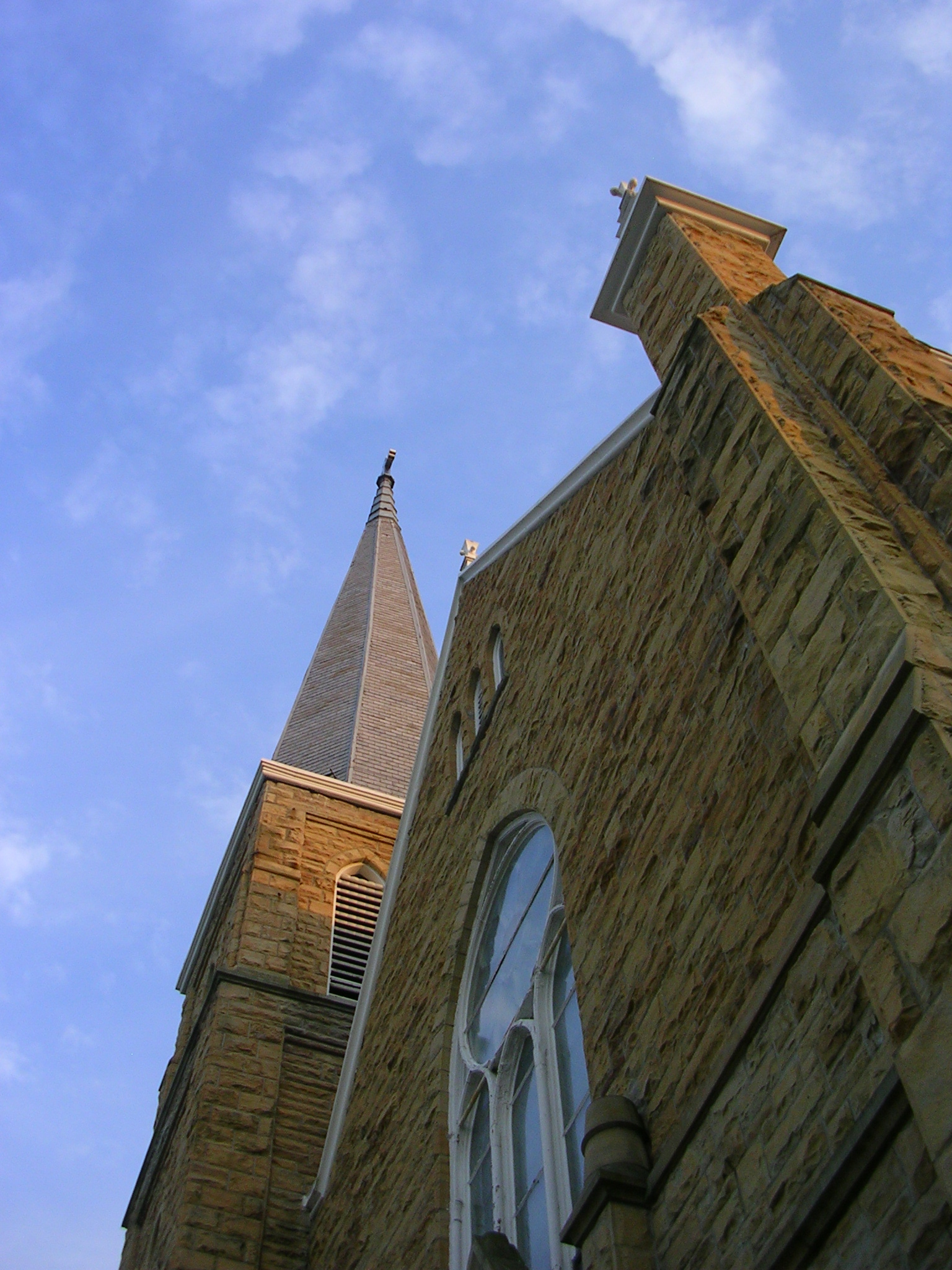
Facade of St. Mary's. Note the original steeple.

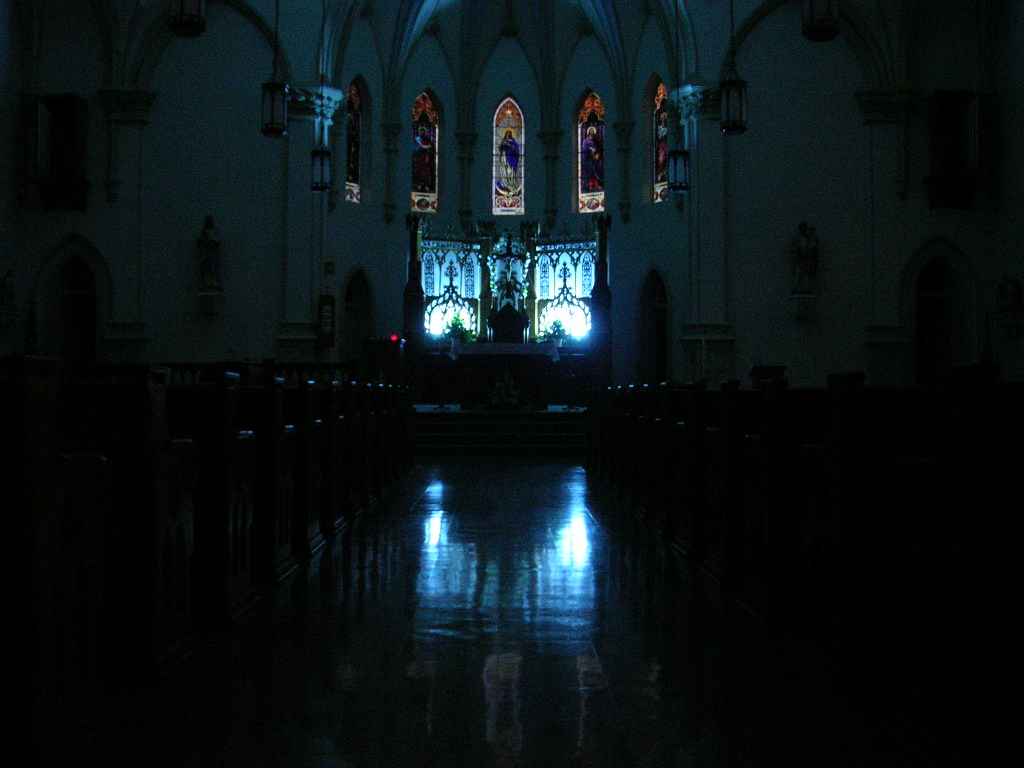
St. Mary's at night. (pre-2015 restoration)

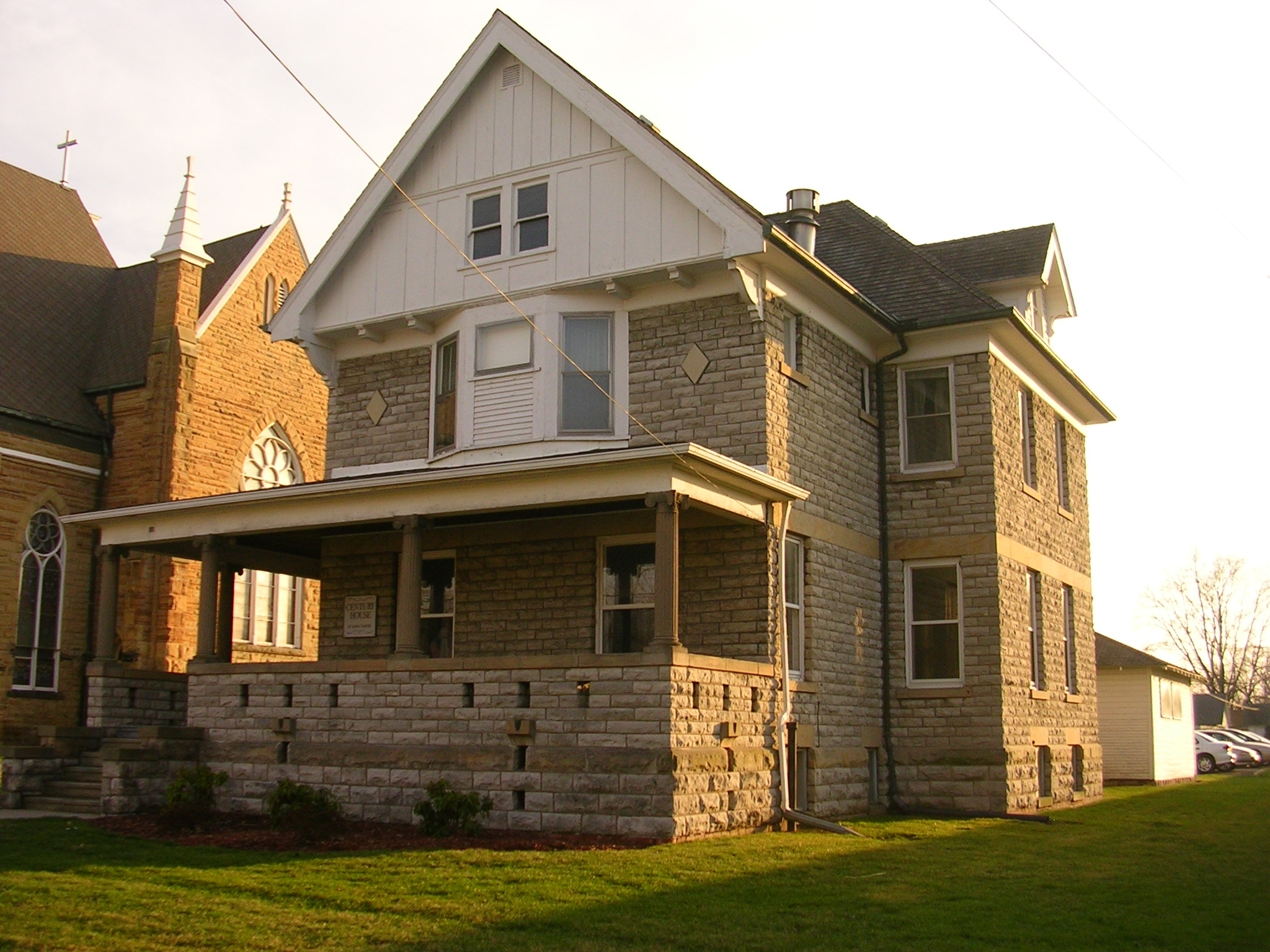
"Century House" - Former Priest and Sister Residence. Now demolished.

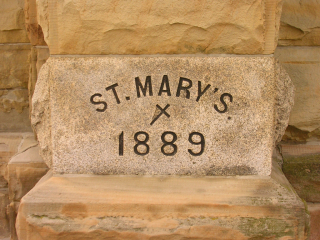
Cornerstone
