= St. Paul High School (Ohio) =

Saint Paul High School

Location
- 93 East Main Street; Norwalk, (Huron County), Ohio 44857-1715; United States; 41°14′41″N 82°36′42″W

Information
- Type: Private, Coeducational
- Religious affiliation: Roman Catholic
- Patron saint: St. Paul
- Opened: 1921
- President: Martin Linder
- Principal: Mike Gocsik
- Chaplain: Fr. Peter Grodi
- Grades: 9–12
- Hours in school day: 7
- Colors: Red and Black
- Slogan: Work Hard. Play Strong. Serve Well.
- Fight song: Across the Field
- Athletics: Football, Volleyball, Golf, Cross Country, Cheerleading, Basketball, Swimming, Wrestling, Baseball, Softball, Track
- Athletics conference: Firelands Conference
- Team name: Flyers
- Rival: Monroeville High School
- Accreditation: North Central Association of Colleges and Schools
- Publication: Flyer Pride
- Yearbook: SPirit
- Affiliation: Roman Catholic Diocese of Toledo
- Dean of Students/A.D.: John Livengood
- Website: https://www.norwalkcatholicschools.org/o/2754/home

Saint Paul High School is a private, Catholic high school located in Norwalk, Ohio. It is part of Norwalk Catholic Schools, a K-12 organization of schools and parishes in Norwalk and neighboring Milan. SPHS has a current enrollment of 199 students and is one of fourteen high schools in the Roman Catholic Diocese of Toledo. The athletic teams are called the Flyers.

== History ==
In 1917, when Fr. George Forst became the pastor at St. Paul Church he did everything he could to make St. Paul High School (then a two-year commercial High School) into a four-year licensed High School. Fr. Forst went to the Fisher Family who owned Fisher Body and asked them for help in the realization of his dream.

The School was completed in 1921. It was the first Roman Catholic Four Year Licensed High School between Cleveland and Toledo. The school also boasted of containing one of the most sophisticated High School Chemistry Labs in the state at the time.

== Athletics ==
St. Paul High School is a member of the Firelands Conference.

=== Football ===
The SPHS Football team won their first regional championship in 1996, and were three-time state runners-up in 1997, 1999, and 2004. In 2006, the team once again advanced to the semifinals in the OHSAA Division VI playoffs. In both 2007 and 2008, they finished as Division 6 Region 21 runners-up. In 2009, the Flyers won their first state championship with a 24-21 victory over Delphos St. John's when quarterback Eric Schwieterman scored the winning touchdown with 5 seconds left to play. Schwieterman had all three of the Flyers touchdowns; Jim Roth pitched in with a field goal. In 2014, St. Paul won another regional title, this time within Division VII, Region 23, and were once again state runners-up.

=== Golf ===
The 2004 SPHS Golf Team made it to the Division III State Championship for the first time in school history. The Flyers finished in third place, losing in a third-place tie-breaker with Lima Central Catholic.

=== Volleyball ===
The SPHS Lady Flyers have also advanced to the Final Four of the state volleyball tournament six times since 2002. In 2002, they won the State Championship with a record of 29-0, beating opponent Maria Stein Marion Local. In 2006, they won it for a second time finishing the season with a mark of 26-3, beating opponent New Knoxville. In 2007 and 2009, the Lady Flyers once again made it to the state finals but lost to Maria Stein Marion Local.

=== Basketball ===
The Flyers have had some past success in their basketball career. Their record includes six Firelands Conference championships (1974, 1979, 1984, 1995, 1996, and 1997), nine Sectional Championships (1993, 1995, 1996, 1997, 1998, 2000, 2002, 2006, and 2009), three District Championships (1995, 1996, and 1997), and a Regional Championship (1996).

The Lady Flyers have also been successful with four Conference Championships (1988, 1989, 1993, and 1999), ten Sectional Championships (1978, 1989, 1993, 1999, 2001, 2002, 2003, 2004, 2005, and 2009), and a District Championship (2001).

=== Clay Shooting Sports ===
St. Paul maintains a shooting team that strictly shoots Trap with the USA High School Clay Target League. The team was the brainchild of a senior who had observed neighboring schools' athletic programs, leading to a student-led push for the founding of the team in 2025 with 9 students under their coach, Mr. Dustin Beal. The team participated in the USA High School Clay Target League in 2026 with an increased initial enrollment of 20 students.

=== Ohio High School Athletic Association State Championships ===
- Football - 2009
- Girls Volleyball - 2002, 2006

== Academic Team ==
In 2007-08 the SPHS Academic Challenge Team won their first Firelands Conference championship since 2000.

In 2010-11 the SPHS Academic Challenge Team won first place in the BGSU Firelands Challenge under team advisor Michael "Herr" Lawson, the former German language teacher.

== Ohio High School Athletic Association State Championships ==
- Boys Football - 2009
- Girls Volleyball – 2002, 2006
