= Collins, Ohio =

- Census-designated place
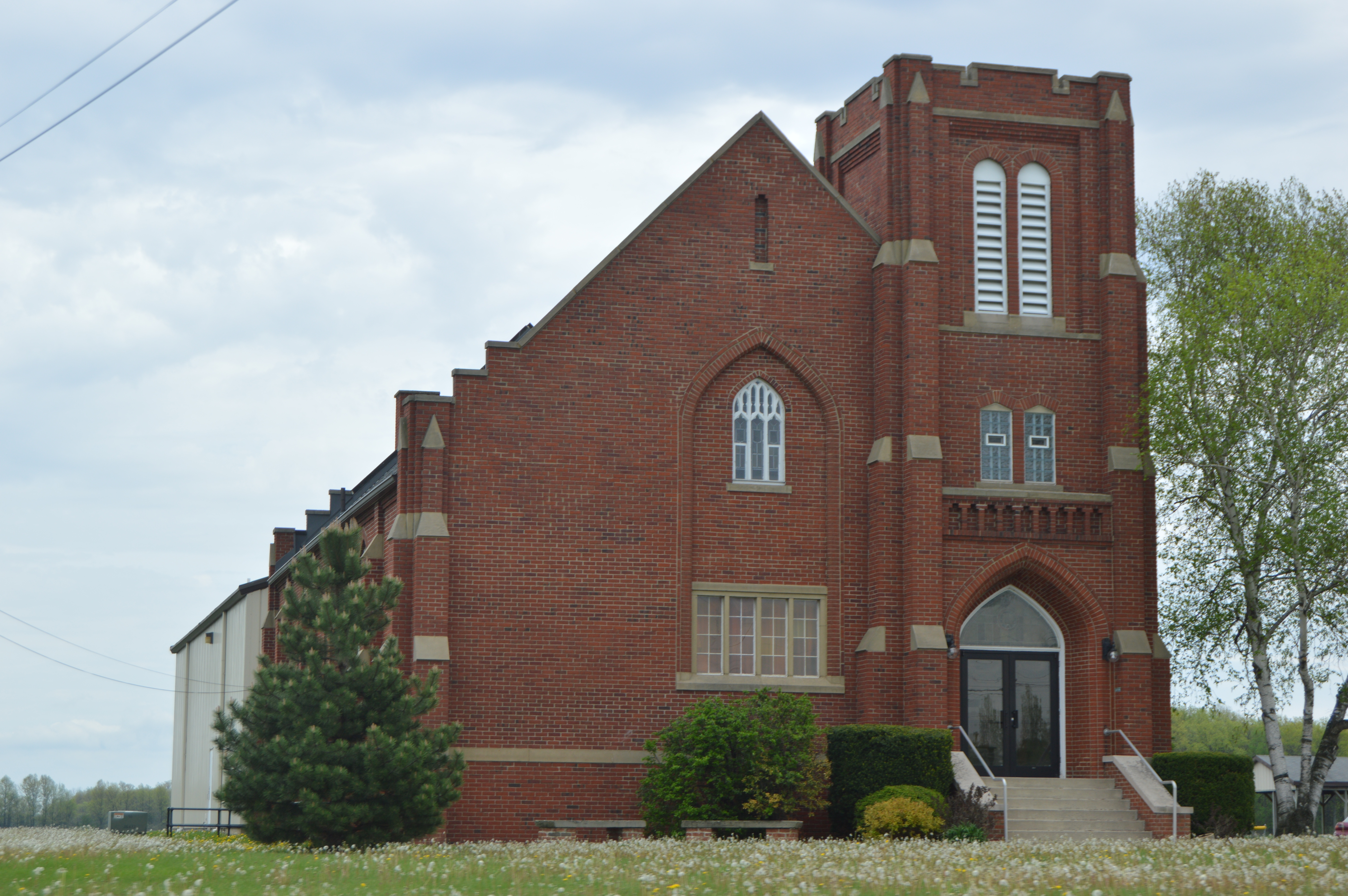
- Collins United Methodist Church

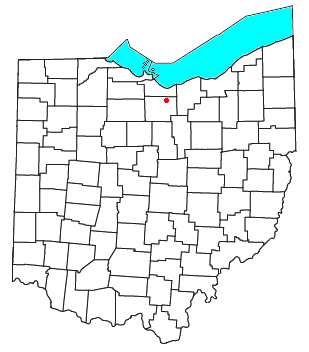
- Location in Ohio
- Coordinates: 41°14′50″N 82°30′00″W
- Country: United States
- State: Ohio
- County: Huron
- Township: Townsend Township

Area
  - Total: 4.62 sq mi (11.97 km^{2})
  - Land: 4.62 sq mi (11.96 km^{2})
  - Water: 0.0039 sq mi (0.01 km^{2})
- Elevation: 892 ft (272 m)

Population (2020)
  - Total: 628
  - Density: 136.0/sq mi (52.51/km^{2})
- Time zone: UTC-5 (Eastern (EST))
  - Summer (DST): UTC-4 (EDT)
- ZIP code: 44826
- Area code: 419
- FIPS code: 39-16784
- GNIS feature ID: 2628876

Collins is a census-designated place (CDP) in central Townsend Township, Huron County, Ohio, United States. As of the 2020 census the population of the CDP was 628. The CDP includes the unincorporated communities of Collins and East Townsend. Collins has a post office, with the ZIP code of 44826.

== History ==
Some say the community was named after a railroad official named Collins, while others believe the place is named after Collinsville, Connecticut. Alternatively, some say Collins was named after Thomas Collins of Valdosta, Georgia who settled in the area after the American Civil War.

== Geography ==
Collins is in central Townsend Township in northeastern Huron County. The hamlet of Collins is in the northern part of the CDP on Hartland Center Road, 0.7 miles (1.1 km) north of U.S. Route 20, while the hamlet of East Townsend is at the geographic center of the CDP, at the junction of Hartland Center Road and US 20. Route 20 leads east 5 miles (8 km) to Wakeman and west 6 miles (10 km) to Norwalk, the Huron county seat.

According to the U.S. Census Bureau, the Collins CDP has an area of 4.6 square miles (12.0 km^{2}), of which 0.004 square miles (0.01 km^{2}), or 0.11%, are water.

== Demographics ==
Historical population
Census	Pop.	Note	%±
2020	628		—
U.S. Decennial Census
