= New London High School (Ohio) =

Location
- 1 Wildcat Drive; New London, Ohio 44851; United States
- Coordinates: 41°4′30″N 82°23′25″W

Information
- Type: Public, coeducational
- School district: New London Local School District
- Principal: Brad Romano
- Teaching staff: 20.50 (FTE)
- Grades: 9-12
- Student to teacher ratio: 11.27
- Colors: Red and black
- Athletics conference: Firelands Conference
- Team name: Wildcats
- Website: nlschools.org/newlondonhighschool_home.aspx

New London High School (NLHS) is a public high school in New London, Ohio, United States. It is the only high school in the New London Local School District. The athletic teams are known as the Wildcats, with the school colors of red and black and the school is a member of the Firelands Conference.

== State championships ==
Team State Championships

- Boys cross country – 1993
- Football - 1951 by First & Ten Magazine Team record 10 - 0

Indivudual State Championships

- Spencer Cole 400m Dash Boys track and field – 2016
- Keith Shepherd Shot Put Boys track and field – 1988
- Shawn Tappel 145lb Wrestling – 1985
- Willard Ferrel Shot Put Boys track and field – 1983
- Todd Wyckoff 185lb Wrestling – 1980 & 1981
- Liz Schick, Julie Bennett, Vickie Jackson, Barb Schick 4x800 Meter Relay Girls track and field – 1980
- Jim Farnsworth 175lb Wrestling – 1978
- Stan Cooke Golf – 1978

== Notable alumni ==
- Robin Meade, CNN anchor
