= Danbury High School (Lakeside, Ohio) =

Location
- 9451 E. Harbor Rd. Lakeside, Ohio 43440; United States
- 41°32′10″N 82°45′18″W

Information
- Type: Public
- Established: 1912
- School district: Danbury Local Schools
- Superintendent: Cari Buehler
- Principal: Laramie Spurlock
- Staff: 14.00 (FTE)
- Grades: 9-12
- Student to teacher ratio: 11.64
- Colors: Blue and White
- Athletics conference: Sandusky Bay Conference; Northern 8 Football Conference (Football only)
- Mascot: Lakers
- Website: danburyschools.org

Danbury High School is a public high school in Lakeside, Ohio. It is the only high school in the Danbury Local Schools district. Their mascot is the Lakers. and they compete in the Sandusky Bay Conference and Northern 8 Football Conference as a member of the Ohio High School Athletic Association.

== History ==
Opened in 1912, Danbury High School serves students grades 9-12.

Danbury High School was formerly known as Lakeside High School but was renamed later on in its history.

== Athletics ==
Danbury High School currently offers.

- Baseball
- Basketball
- Cheerleading
- Cross Country
- Golf
- Football (8-man)
- Softball
- Track and field
- Volleyball
