= Plymouth, Ohio =

- Village
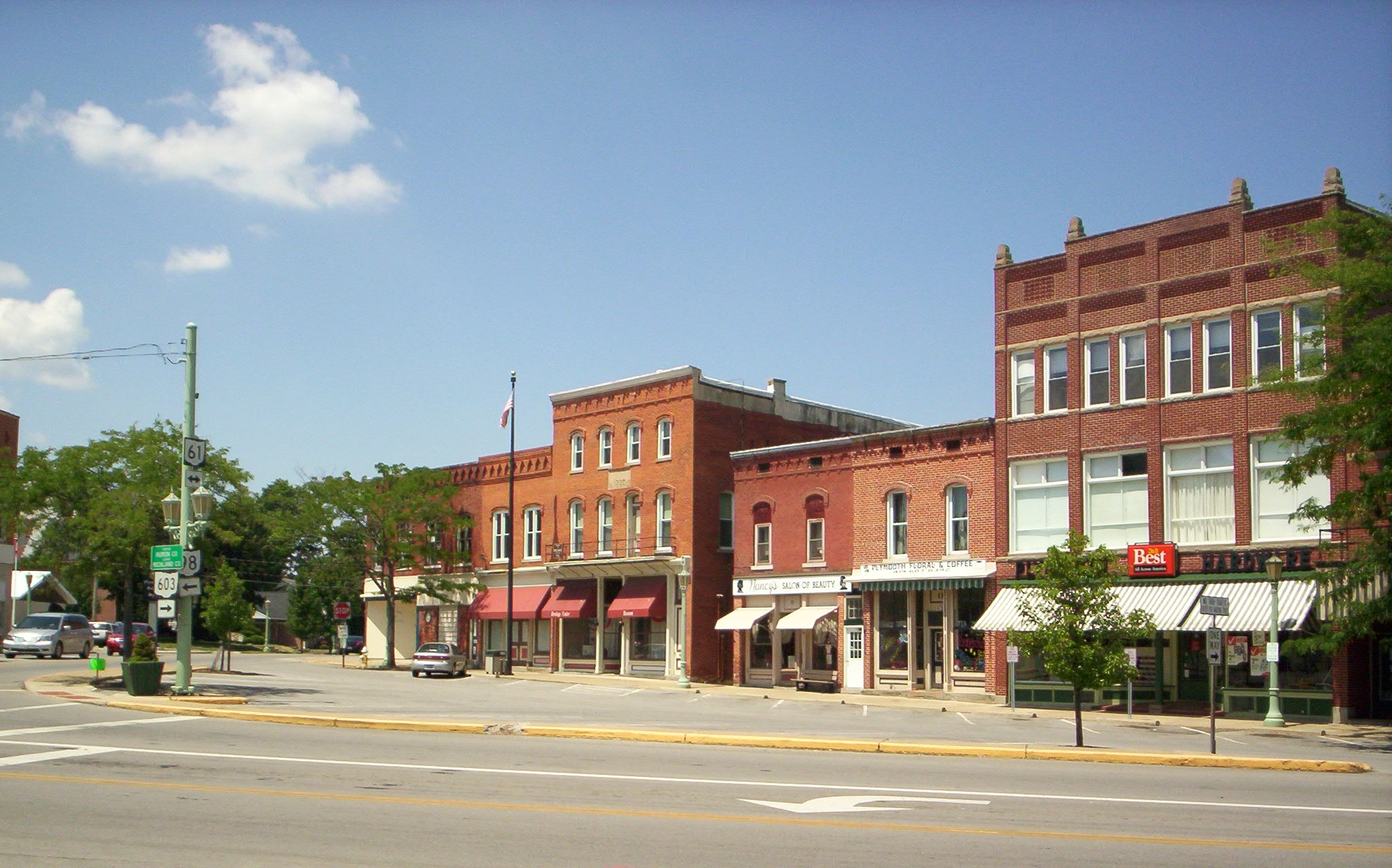
- East Main Street, downtown

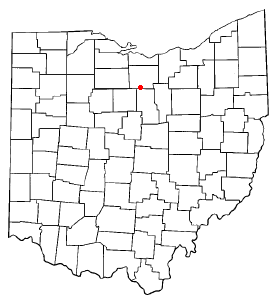
- Location of Plymouth, Ohio

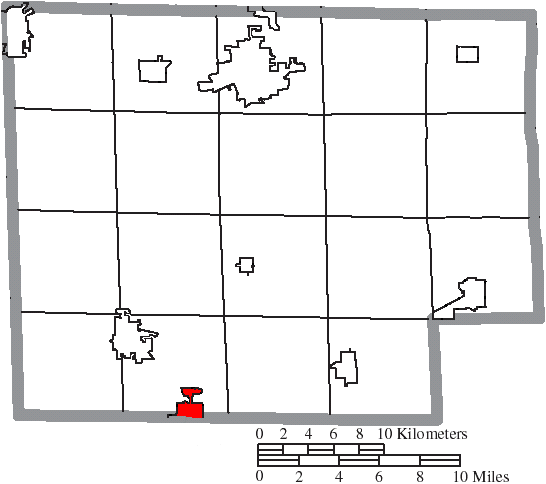
- Location of Plymouth in Huron County
- Coordinates: 40°59′56″N 82°40′02″W
- Country: United States
- State: Ohio
- Counties: Richland, Huron

Government
  - Mayor: Cassandra Fryman (L)

Area
  - Total: 2.56 sq mi (6.63 km^{2})
  - Land: 2.53 sq mi (6.55 km^{2})
  - Water: 0.031 sq mi (0.08 km^{2})
- Elevation: 1,014 ft (309 m)

Population (2020)
  - Total: 1,707
  - Density: 675/sq mi (260.8/km^{2})
- Time zone: UTC-5 (Eastern (EST))
  - Summer (DST): UTC-4 (EDT)
- ZIP code: 44865
- Area code: 419
- FIPS code: 39-63800
- GNIS feature ID: 2398988
- Website: http://www.plymouthoh.org/

Plymouth is a village in Huron and Richland counties in the U.S. state of Ohio. The population was 1,707 at the 2020 census.

The Richland County portion of Plymouth is part of the Mansfield Metropolitan Statistical Area, while the Huron County portion is part of the Norwalk Micropolitan Statistical Area.

== History ==
Plymouth was laid out in 1825. The village was named after Plymouth Rock. Plymouth was incorporated in 1834.

Plymouth was formerly the headquarters of the Plymouth Locomotive Works, a builder of industrial railroad locomotives. The factory closed in 1999. The company designed and built an automobile named Plymouth in the early part of the century, but it was not mass-produced, but there were trucks and tractors produced by Commercial Motor Truck Company under the Plymouth name in the same period. Later, Chrysler Motors developed the Plymouth Automobile Division, but thought the Ohio company had infringed on their name. A court battle ensued over the ownership of the name Plymouth, which Chrysler lost when it was determined the original Plymouth car preceded Chrysler's by several years.

== Geography ==
Plymouth is located at 40°59′46″N 82°40′0″W (40.996121, -82.666746).

According to the United States Census Bureau, the village has a total area of 2.50 square miles (6.47 km^{2}), of which 2.47 square miles (6.40 km^{2}) is land and 0.03 square miles (0.08 km^{2}) is water.

The east–west main street in downtown Plymouth is known as East Main and West Broadway and in the surrounding unincorporated areas is known as Base Line Road, as it divides Richland and Huron counties, which puts the village in dual political geographies. This presents several difficulties such as taxes, laws and law enforcement. While the village has its own police force, half shares jurisdiction with the Huron County Sheriff's Department and half with the Richland County Sheriff's Department.

== Demographics ==
Historical population
Census	Pop.	Note	%±
1860	462		—
1870	703		52.2%
1880	1,145		62.9%
1890	1,133		−1.0%
1900	1,154		1.9%
1910	1,314		13.9%
1920	1,374		4.6%
1930	1,339		−2.5%
1940	1,403		4.8%
1950	1,510		7.6%
1960	1,822		20.7%
1970	1,993		9.4%
1980	1,939		−2.7%
1990	1,942		0.2%
2000	1,852		−4.6%
2010	1,857		0.3%
2020	1,707		−8.1%

=== 2010 census ===
As of the census of 2010, there were 1,857 people, 696 households, and 499 families living in the village. The population density was 751.8 inhabitants per square mile (290.3/km^{2}). There were 794 housing units at an average density of 321.5 per square mile (124.1/km^{2}). The racial makeup of the village was 97.6% White, 0.3% African American, 0.2% Native American, 0.2% Asian, 0.9% from other races, and 0.7% from two or more races. Hispanic or Latino of any race were 2.5% of the population.

There were 696 households, of which 40.4% had children under the age of 18 living with them, 47.6% were married couples living together, 18.1% had a female householder with no husband present, 6.0% had a male householder with no wife present, and 28.3% were non-families. 23.7% of all households were made up of individuals, and 11% had someone living alone who was 65 years of age or older. The average household size was 2.67 and the average family size was 3.13.

The median age in the village was 34.1 years. 29.5% of residents were under the age of 18; 9.2% were between the ages of 18 and 24; 26.4% were from 25 to 44; 21.5% were from 45 to 64; and 13.3% were 65 years of age or older. The gender makeup of the village was 48.1% male and 51.9% female.

=== 2000 census ===
As of the census of 2000, there were 1,852 people, 678 households, and 536 families living in the village. The population density was 834.4 inhabitants per square mile (322.2/km^{2}). There were 744 housing units at an average density of 335.2 per square mile (129.4/km^{2}). The racial makeup of the village was 98.16% White, 0.22% African American, 0.11% Native American, 0.59% from other races, and 0.92% from two or more races. Hispanic or Latino of any race were 1.03% of the population.

There were 678 households, out of which 40.9% had children under the age of 18 living with them, 61.1% were married couples living together, 13.4% had a female householder with no husband present, and 20.8% were non-families. 18.3% of all households were made up of individuals, and 6.9% had someone living alone who was 65 years of age or older. The average household size was 2.73 and the average family size was 3.09.

In the village, the population was spread out, with 31.0% under the age of 18, 8.3% from 18 to 24, 28.5% from 25 to 44, 22.3% from 45 to 64, and 9.9% who were 65 years of age or older. The median age was 33 years. For every 100 females there were 95.2 males. For every 100 females age 18 and over, there were 89.6 males.

The median income for a household in the village was $36,994, and the median income for a family was $40,559. Males had a median income of $35,737 versus $23,807 for females. The per capita income for the village was $15,474. About 10.4% of families and 13.3% of the population were below the poverty line, including 18.8% of those under age 18 and 7.6% of those age 65 or over.

== Education ==
Plymouth is located within the Plymouth-Shiloh Local School District. The district administers three public schools in Plymouth including Plymouth-Shiloh Elementary School, Shiloh Middle School, and Plymouth High School.

Plymouth has a public library, a branch of the Mansfield–Richland County Public Library.

== Entertainment ==
The first movie theater in Plymouth was opened in the mid-1910s by Reuben Deisler. The Deisler Theatre gained some national press because its eponymous operator was completely blind. The building was still standing as of September 2009.

== Notable people ==
- David Ross Locke, journalist and early political commentator during the American Civil War
- Eleanor Searle Whitney McCollum, spouse of Cornelius Vanderbilt Whitney and founder of the Heritage Center Museum
- John M. C. Smith, U.S. Representative from Michigan
