= Mansfield–Ashland–Bucyrus combined statistical area =

Coordinates: 40°45′N 82°45′W

Mansfield Metropolitan Area
- Combined statistical area
- Mansfield–Ashland–Bucyrus, OH Combined Statistical Area
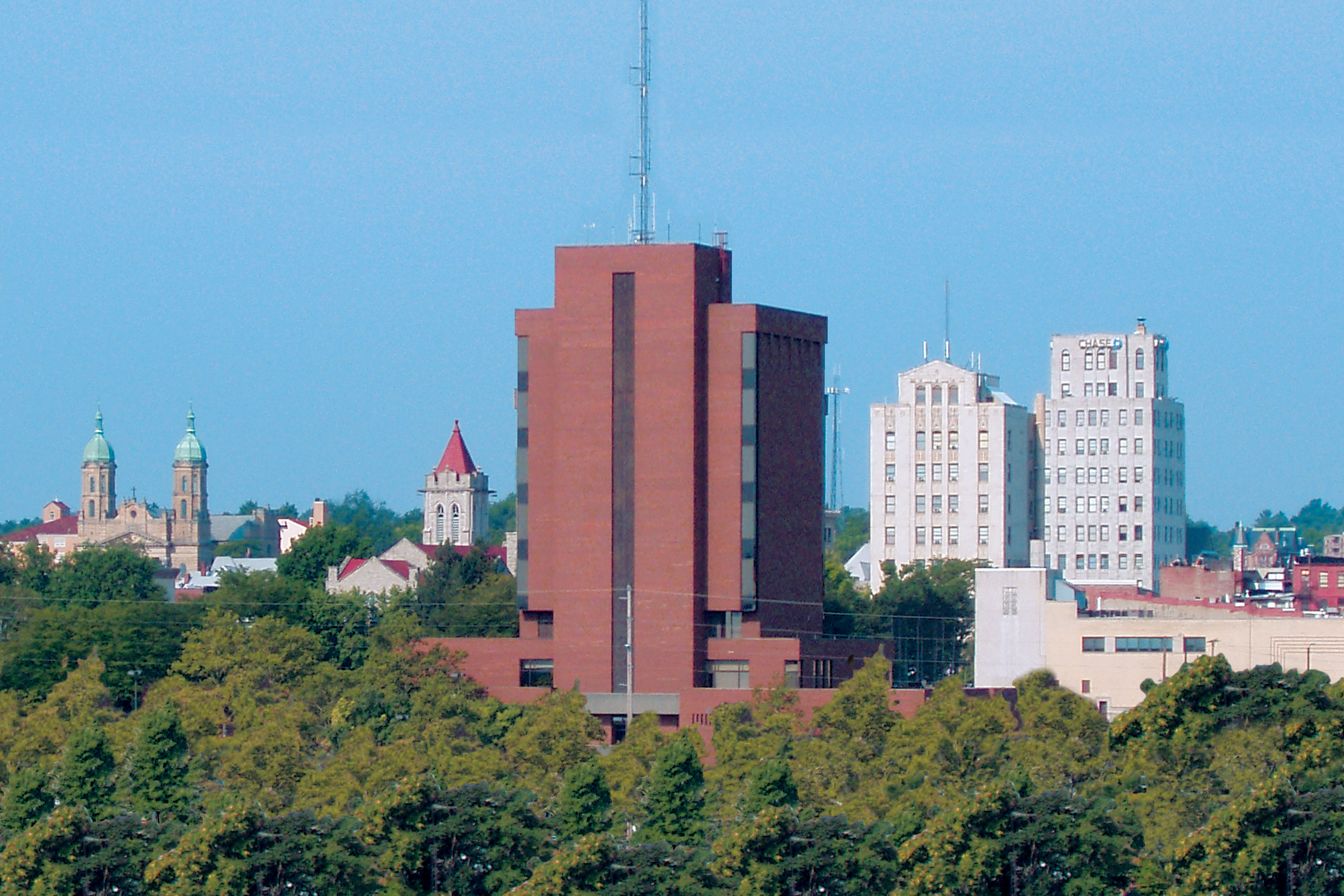
- Skyline of Downtown Mansfield
Mansfield–Ashland–Bucyrus, OH CSA
City of Mansfield
Mansfield MSA
Bucyrus µSA
Ashland µSA

The Mansfield–Ashland–Bucyrus, OH Combined Statistical Area is a CSA in the U.S. state of Ohio, as defined by the United States Census Bureau. It consists of the Mansfield Metropolitan Statistical Area (Richland County); and the Bucyrus–Galion Micropolitan Statistical Area (Crawford County), and, since 2020, the Ashland Micropolitan Statistical Area (Ashland County). As of the 2020 Census, the CSA had a population of 219,408.

This area also has a strong commuter interchange with Cleveland and Columbus and their metropolitan areas.

== All communities and townships ==
=== Richland County ===
The Mansfield Metropolitan Area includes the cities of Mansfield, Ontario, and Shelby. It also includes the villages of Bellville, Butler, Lexington, Lucas, Plymouth, and Shiloh. An unincorporated community that is also included is Olivesburg. Townships that are also included are Blooming Grove, Butler, Cass, Franklin, Jackson, Jefferson, Madison, Mifflin, Monroe, Perry, Plymouth, Sandusky, Sharon, Springfield, Troy, Washington, Weller, and Worthington.

=== Ashland County ===
The Ashland Micropolitan Area includes the city of Ashland. It also includes the villages of Bailey Lakes, Hayesville, Jeromesville, Loudonville, Mifflin, Perrysville, Polk, and Savannah. Townships that are also included are Clear Creek, Green, Hanover, Jackson, Lake, Mifflin, Milton, Mohican, Montgomery, Orange, Perry, Ruggles, Sullivan, Troy, and Vermillion.

=== Crawford County ===
The Bucyrus Micropolitan Area includes the cities of Bucyrus, Galion, and Crestline. It also includes the villages of Chatfield, New Washington, North Robinson, and Tiro. Unincorporated communities that are also included are Brokensword, Oceola, and Sulphur Springs. Townships that are also included are Auburn, Bucyrus, Chatfield, Cranberry, Dallas, Holmes, Jackson, Jefferson, Liberty, Lykens, Polk, Sandusky, Texas, Tod, Vernon, and Whetstone.

== Demographics ==
Historical population
| Census | Pop. | Note | %± |
|---|---|---|---|
| 2000 | 175,818 | | — |
| 2010 | 168,259 | | −4.3% |
| 2020 | 219,408 | | 30.4% |
Prior to the 2020 census, Ashland County (pop. 52,447) was added to the CSA. U.S. Decennial Census
