= Mansfield metropolitan area, Ohio =

Coordinates: 40°47′N 82°32′W

Mansfield Metropolitan Area
- Metropolitan Statistical Area
- Mansfield, OH Metropolitan Statistical Area
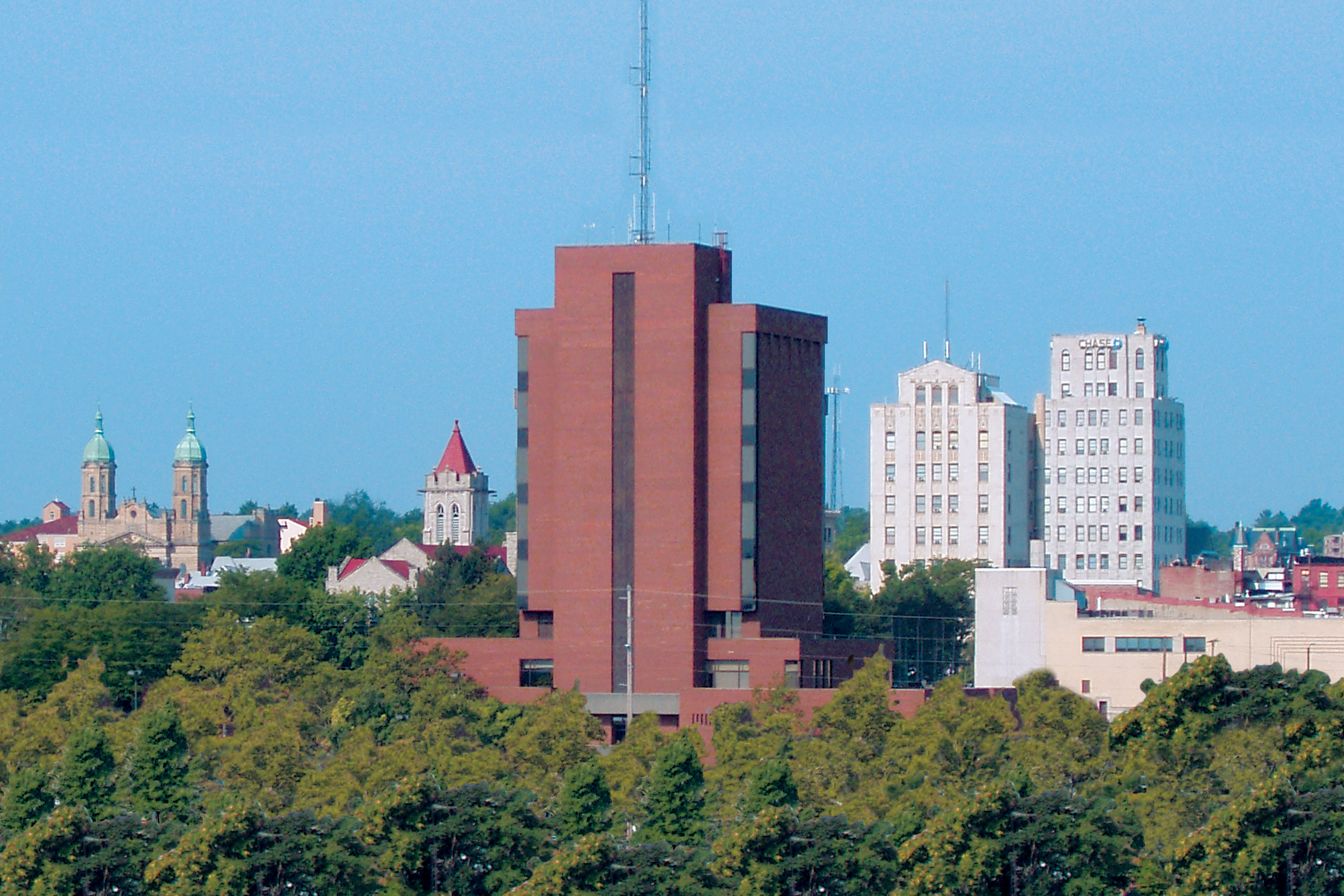
- Skyline of Downtown Mansfield
Mansfield–Ashland–Bucyrus, OH CSA
City of Mansfield
Mansfield MSA
Bucyrus µSA
Ashland µSA

The Mansfield Metropolitan Statistical Area, as defined by the United States Census Bureau, is an area consisting of one county – Richland – in north central Ohio, anchored by the city of Mansfield. As of the 2020 census, the MSA had a population of 124,936. The MSA forms the eastern half of the Mansfield–Ashland–Bucyrus, OH CSA.

== History ==
The Mansfield metropolitan area was first defined in 1971. Then known as the Mansfield Standard Metropolitan Statistical Area (Mansfield SMSA), it consisted of a single county – Richland – and had a population of 129,997 in the 1970 census. By the census of 1980, the population had grown to 131,205. In 1983, the official name was shortened to the Mansfield Metropolitan Statistical Area (Mansfield MSA), which is still in use to date. The population had declined to 126,137 in 1990. By the census of 2000, the population had grown to 128,852.

Crawford County was added to the MSA in 1999. The two-county area had 175,818 residents in 2000. In 2003, Crawford County was removed from the Mansfield metropolitan area and was re-designated as the Bucyrus Micropolitan Statistical Area (Bucyrus μSA).

== Communities ==
=== Cities ===
- Crestline (partial)
- Galion (partial)
- Mansfield (Principal city)
- Ontario
- Shelby

=== Villages ===
- Bellville
- Butler
- Lexington
- Lucas
- Plymouth (partial)
- Shiloh

=== Unincorporated places ===
- Olivesburg

== Townships ==
- Blooming Grove
- Butler
- Cass
- Franklin
- Jackson
- Jefferson
- Madison
- Mifflin
- Monroe
- Perry
- Plymouth
- Sandusky
- Sharon
- Springfield
- Troy
- Washington
- Weller
- Worthington

== Combined Statistical Area ==
The Mansfield–Ashland–Bucyrus Combined Statistical Area is made up of three counties in Northern Ohio. The statistical area includes one metropolitan area and two micropolitan areas.

- Metropolitan Statistical Area (MSA)
  - Mansfield (Richland County)
- Micropolitan Statistical Areas (μSAs)
  - Ashland (Ashland County)
  - Bucyrus (Crawford County)

== See also ==
- Ohio census statistical areas
