= Crestview Local School District (Richland County) =

School district in Ohio

Crestview Local School District is a public school district serving students in the northeastern part of Richland County just north of the city of Mansfield and the northwestern part of Ashland County just northwest of the city of Ashland in the U.S. state of Ohio. Municipalities and townships that are included in the school district in Richland County are northern parts of the city of Mansfield, most of Franklin Township, all of Weller Township (including the unincorporated community of Olivesburg), all of Butler Township, and southern parts of Blooming Grove Township. Municipalities and townships that are included in the school district in Ashland County are the villages of Savannah and Bailey Lakes, most of Clear Creek Township, and northwestern parts of Orange Township. The school district enrolls 1,256 students as of the 2007–2008 academic year.

== Schools ==
=== Elementary schools ===
- Crestview Elementary School (Grades K through 3rd

d)

=== Middle schools ===
- Crestview Middle School (Grades 4th through 8th)

=== High schools ===
- Crestview High School (Grades 9th through 12th)
