= Crestview =

Crestview may refer to:

== Places ==
Canada

- Crestview, Ottawa, Ontario

United States

- Crestview Lodge, in Mono County
- Crestview, Los Angeles, a neighborhood in California
- Crestview, Florida
- Crestview, Georgia
- Crestview, Hawaii
- Crestview, Kentucky
- Crestview, New Mexico
- Crestview, Austin, Texas, a neighborhood
- Crestview, Rock County, Wisconsin

== Train stations ==
- Crestview station, a commuter rail station in Austin, Texas
- Crestview station (Florida), defunct

== See also ==
- Crestview High School (disambiguation)
- Crestview Local School District (disambiguation)
