= Ohio statistical areas =

Coordinates: 40.2862°N 82.7937°W

The U.S. state of Ohio currently has 55 statistical areas that have been delineated by the Office of Management and Budget (OMB). On July 21, 2023, the OMB delineated 11 combined statistical areas, 15 metropolitan statistical areas, and 29 micropolitan statistical areas in Ohio. As of 2025, the largest of these is the Cleveland–Akron–Canton, OH CSA, comprising Cleveland and other cities in the northeast region of the state.

== Statistical areas ==
The Office of Management and Budget (OMB) has designated more than 1,000 statistical areas for the United States and Puerto Rico. These statistical areas are important geographic delineations of population clusters used by the OMB, the United States Census Bureau, planning organizations, and federal, state, and local government entities.

The OMB defines a core-based statistical area (commonly referred to as a CBSA) as the county or counties (or county-equivalents) surrounding at least one densely-settled core of at least 10,000 population, "plus adjacent counties having a high degree of social and economic integration with the core as measured through commuting ties with the counties containing the core". The OMB further divides core-based statistical areas based on population into metropolitan statistical areas (MSAs) for those with at least 50,000 and micropolitan statistical areas (μSAs) for those with 10,000 to 49,999 people.

The OMB defines a combined statistical area (CSA) as two or more adjacent core-based statistical areas where the employment interchange rate (% commuting from A to B plus % commuting from B to A) is at least 15%. The primary statistical areas (PSAs) include all combined statistical areas and any core-based statistical area that is not a constituent of a combined statistical area.

The 55 United States statistical areas and 88 counties of the State of Ohio (Note: An out-of-state area and its population are displayed in green. An area that extends into more than one state is displayed in purple. A purple population number over a black population number show the total population versus the in-state population. The state's abbreviation is also shown next to the in-state total.)
Combined statistical area	2025 population (est.)	Core-based statistical area	2025 population (est.)	County	2025 population (est.)
Cleveland–Akron–Canton, OH CSA	3,743,802	Cleveland, OH MSA	2,165,775	Cuyahoga County, Ohio	1,232,925
Cleveland–Akron–Canton, OH CSA	3,743,802	Cleveland, OH MSA	2,165,775	Lorain County, Ohio	323,219
Cleveland–Akron–Canton, OH CSA	3,743,802	Cleveland, OH MSA	2,165,775	Lake County, Ohio	232,217
Cleveland–Akron–Canton, OH CSA	3,743,802	Cleveland, OH MSA	2,165,775	Medina County, Ohio	185,025
Cleveland–Akron–Canton, OH CSA	3,743,802	Cleveland, OH MSA	2,165,775	Ashtabula County, Ohio	96,713
Cleveland–Akron–Canton, OH CSA	3,743,802	Cleveland, OH MSA	2,165,775	Geauga County, Ohio	95,676
Cleveland–Akron–Canton, OH CSA	3,743,802	Akron, OH MSA	701,780	Summit County, Ohio	538,376
Cleveland–Akron–Canton, OH CSA	3,743,802	Akron, OH MSA	701,780	Portage County, Ohio	163,404
Cleveland–Akron–Canton, OH CSA	3,743,802	Canton–Massillon, OH MSA	400,246	Stark County, Ohio	373,771
Cleveland–Akron–Canton, OH CSA	3,743,802	Canton–Massillon, OH MSA	400,246	Carroll County, Ohio	26,475
Cleveland–Akron–Canton, OH CSA	3,743,802	Wooster, OH μSA	116,758	Wayne County, Ohio	116,758
Cleveland–Akron–Canton, OH CSA	3,743,802	Sandusky, OH MSA	112,777	Erie County, Ohio	73,296
Cleveland–Akron–Canton, OH CSA	3,743,802	Sandusky, OH MSA	112,777	Ottawa County, Ohio	39,481
Cleveland–Akron–Canton, OH CSA	3,743,802	New Philadelphia–Dover, OH μSA	92,373	Tuscarawas County, Ohio	92,373
Cleveland–Akron–Canton, OH CSA	3,743,802	Fremont, OH μSA	58,655	Sandusky County, Ohio	58,655
Cleveland–Akron–Canton, OH CSA	3,743,802	Norwalk, OH μSA	58,250	Huron County, Ohio	58,250
Cleveland–Akron–Canton, OH CSA	3,743,802	Coshocton, OH μSA	37,188	Coshocton County, Ohio	37,188
Columbus–Marion–Zanesville, OH CSA	2,681,018	Columbus, OH MSA	2,242,028	Franklin County, Ohio	1,361,536
Columbus–Marion–Zanesville, OH CSA	2,681,018	Columbus, OH MSA	2,242,028	Delaware County, Ohio	242,032
Columbus–Marion–Zanesville, OH CSA	2,681,018	Columbus, OH MSA	2,242,028	Licking County, Ohio	185,564
Columbus–Marion–Zanesville, OH CSA	2,681,018	Columbus, OH MSA	2,242,028	Fairfield County, Ohio	169,752
Columbus–Marion–Zanesville, OH CSA	2,681,018	Columbus, OH MSA	2,242,028	Union County, Ohio	73,446
Columbus–Marion–Zanesville, OH CSA	2,681,018	Columbus, OH MSA	2,242,028	Pickaway County, Ohio	62,978
Columbus–Marion–Zanesville, OH CSA	2,681,018	Columbus, OH MSA	2,242,028	Madison County, Ohio	46,985
Columbus–Marion–Zanesville, OH CSA	2,681,018	Columbus, OH MSA	2,242,028	Morrow County, Ohio	36,305
Columbus–Marion–Zanesville, OH CSA	2,681,018	Columbus, OH MSA	2,242,028	Perry County, Ohio	35,918
Columbus–Marion–Zanesville, OH CSA	2,681,018	Columbus, OH MSA	2,242,028	Hocking County, Ohio	27,512
Columbus–Marion–Zanesville, OH CSA	2,681,018	Zanesville, OH μSA	87,014	Muskingum County, Ohio	87,014
Columbus–Marion–Zanesville, OH CSA	2,681,018	Chillicothe, OH μSA	76,429	Ross County, Ohio	76,429
Columbus–Marion–Zanesville, OH CSA	2,681,018	Marion, OH μSA	65,115	Marion County, Ohio	65,115
Columbus–Marion–Zanesville, OH CSA	2,681,018	Mount Vernon, OH μSA	64,002	Knox County, Ohio	64,002
Columbus–Marion–Zanesville, OH CSA	2,681,018	Athens, OH μSA	63,197	Athens County, Ohio	63,197
Columbus–Marion–Zanesville, OH CSA	2,681,018	Bellefontaine, OH μSA	46,302	Logan County, Ohio	46,302
Columbus–Marion–Zanesville, OH CSA	2,681,018	Cambridge, OH μSA	38,379	Guernsey County, Ohio	38,379
Columbus–Marion–Zanesville, OH CSA	2,681,018	Washington Court House, OH μSA	28,552	Fayette County, Ohio	28,552
Cincinnati–Wilmington, OH–KY–IN CSA	2,355,159; 1,799,402 (OH)	Cincinnati, OH-KY-IN MSA	2,312,858; 1,757,101 (OH)	Hamilton County, Ohio	838,418
Cincinnati–Wilmington, OH–KY–IN CSA	2,355,159; 1,799,402 (OH)	Cincinnati, OH-KY-IN MSA	2,312,858; 1,757,101 (OH)	Butler County, Ohio	400,128
Cincinnati–Wilmington, OH–KY–IN CSA	2,355,159; 1,799,402 (OH)	Cincinnati, OH-KY-IN MSA	2,312,858; 1,757,101 (OH)	Warren County, Ohio	257,181
Cincinnati–Wilmington, OH–KY–IN CSA	2,355,159; 1,799,402 (OH)	Cincinnati, OH-KY-IN MSA	2,312,858; 1,757,101 (OH)	Clermont County, Ohio	216,977
Cincinnati–Wilmington, OH–KY–IN CSA	2,355,159; 1,799,402 (OH)	Cincinnati, OH-KY-IN MSA	2,312,858; 1,757,101 (OH)	Kenton County, Kentucky	175,779
Cincinnati–Wilmington, OH–KY–IN CSA	2,355,159; 1,799,402 (OH)	Cincinnati, OH-KY-IN MSA	2,312,858; 1,757,101 (OH)	Boone County, Kentucky	145,316
Cincinnati–Wilmington, OH–KY–IN CSA	2,355,159; 1,799,402 (OH)	Cincinnati, OH-KY-IN MSA	2,312,858; 1,757,101 (OH)	Campbell County, Kentucky	95,441
Cincinnati–Wilmington, OH–KY–IN CSA	2,355,159; 1,799,402 (OH)	Cincinnati, OH-KY-IN MSA	2,312,858; 1,757,101 (OH)	Dearborn County, Indiana	51,609
Cincinnati–Wilmington, OH–KY–IN CSA	2,355,159; 1,799,402 (OH)	Cincinnati, OH-KY-IN MSA	2,312,858; 1,757,101 (OH)	Brown County, Ohio	44,397
Cincinnati–Wilmington, OH–KY–IN CSA	2,355,159; 1,799,402 (OH)	Cincinnati, OH-KY-IN MSA	2,312,858; 1,757,101 (OH)	Grant County, Kentucky	26,181
Cincinnati–Wilmington, OH–KY–IN CSA	2,355,159; 1,799,402 (OH)	Cincinnati, OH-KY-IN MSA	2,312,858; 1,757,101 (OH)	Franklin County, Indiana	23,286
Cincinnati–Wilmington, OH–KY–IN CSA	2,355,159; 1,799,402 (OH)	Cincinnati, OH-KY-IN MSA	2,312,858; 1,757,101 (OH)	Pendleton County, Kentucky	14,800
Cincinnati–Wilmington, OH–KY–IN CSA	2,355,159; 1,799,402 (OH)	Cincinnati, OH-KY-IN MSA	2,312,858; 1,757,101 (OH)	Gallatin County, Kentucky	8,840
Cincinnati–Wilmington, OH–KY–IN CSA	2,355,159; 1,799,402 (OH)	Cincinnati, OH-KY-IN MSA	2,312,858; 1,757,101 (OH)	Bracken County, Kentucky	8,511
Cincinnati–Wilmington, OH–KY–IN CSA	2,355,159; 1,799,402 (OH)	Cincinnati, OH-KY-IN MSA	2,312,858; 1,757,101 (OH)	Ohio County, Indiana	5,994
Cincinnati–Wilmington, OH–KY–IN CSA	2,355,159; 1,799,402 (OH)	Wilmington, OH μSA	42,301	Clinton County, Ohio	42,301
Dayton–Springfield–Kettering, OH CSA	1,100,299	Dayton–Kettering–Beavercreek, OH MSA	826,554	Montgomery County, Ohio	539,598
Dayton–Springfield–Kettering, OH CSA	1,100,299	Dayton–Kettering–Beavercreek, OH MSA	826,554	Greene County, Ohio	174,322
Dayton–Springfield–Kettering, OH CSA	1,100,299	Dayton–Kettering–Beavercreek, OH MSA	826,554	Miami County, Ohio	112,634
Dayton–Springfield–Kettering, OH CSA	1,100,299	Springfield, OH MSA	135,340	Clark County, Ohio	135,340
Dayton–Springfield–Kettering, OH CSA	1,100,299	Greenville, OH μSA	51,520	Darke County, Ohio	51,520
Dayton–Springfield–Kettering, OH CSA	1,100,299	Sidney, OH μSA	48,065	Shelby County, Ohio	48,065
Dayton–Springfield–Kettering, OH CSA	1,100,299	Urbana, OH μSA	38,820	Champaign County, Ohio	38,820
none		Toledo, OH MSA	599,376	Lucas County, Ohio	423,347
none		Toledo, OH MSA	599,376	Wood County, Ohio	134,176
none		Toledo, OH MSA	599,376	Fulton County, Ohio	41,853
Youngstown–Warren–Salem, OH CSA	523,055	Youngstown–Warren, OH MSA	423,678	Mahoning County, Ohio	224,706
Youngstown–Warren–Salem, OH CSA	523,055	Youngstown–Warren, OH MSA	423,678	Trumbull County, Ohio	198,972
Youngstown–Warren–Salem, OH CSA	523,055	Salem, OH μSA	99,377	Columbiana County, Ohio	99,377
Mansfield–Ashland–Bucyrus, OH CSA	219,312	Mansfield, OH MSA	124,893	Richland County, Ohio	124,893
Mansfield–Ashland–Bucyrus, OH CSA	219,312	Ashland, OH μSA	52,523	Ashland County, Ohio	52,523
Mansfield–Ashland–Bucyrus, OH CSA	219,312	Bucyrus, OH μSA	41,896	Crawford County, Ohio	41,896
Lima–Van Wert–Celina, OH CSA	218,540	Lima, OH MSA	100,881	Allen County, Ohio	100,881
Lima–Van Wert–Celina, OH CSA	218,540	Wapakoneta, OH μSA	45,909	Auglaize County, Ohio	45,909
Lima–Van Wert–Celina, OH CSA	218,540	Celina, OH μSA	42,737	Mercer County, Ohio	42,737
Lima–Van Wert–Celina, OH CSA	218,540	Van Wert, OH μSA	29,013	Van Wert County, Ohio	29,013
Findlay–Tiffin, OH CSA	129,556	Findlay, OH μSA	75,034	Hancock County, Ohio	75,034
Findlay–Tiffin, OH CSA	129,556	Tiffin, OH μSA	54,522	Seneca County, Ohio	54,522
Charleston–Huntington–Ashland, WV-OH-KY CSA	637,500; 127,075 (OH)	Huntington–Ashland, WV-OH-KY MSA	365,965; 55,710 (OH)	Cabell County, West Virginia	91,183
Charleston–Huntington–Ashland, WV-OH-KY CSA	637,500; 127,075 (OH)	Huntington–Ashland, WV-OH-KY MSA	365,965; 55,710 (OH)	Putnam County, West Virginia	56,885
Charleston–Huntington–Ashland, WV-OH-KY CSA	637,500; 127,075 (OH)	Huntington–Ashland, WV-OH-KY MSA	365,965; 55,710 (OH)	Lawrence County, Ohio	55,710
Charleston–Huntington–Ashland, WV-OH-KY CSA	637,500; 127,075 (OH)	Huntington–Ashland, WV-OH-KY MSA	365,965; 55,710 (OH)	Boyd County, Kentucky	47,751
Charleston–Huntington–Ashland, WV-OH-KY CSA	637,500; 127,075 (OH)	Huntington–Ashland, WV-OH-KY MSA	365,965; 55,710 (OH)	Wayne County, West Virginia	37,309
Charleston–Huntington–Ashland, WV-OH-KY CSA	637,500; 127,075 (OH)	Huntington–Ashland, WV-OH-KY MSA	365,965; 55,710 (OH)	Greenup County, Kentucky	35,213
Charleston–Huntington–Ashland, WV-OH-KY CSA	637,500; 127,075 (OH)	Huntington–Ashland, WV-OH-KY MSA	365,965; 55,710 (OH)	Carter County, Kentucky	26,149
Charleston–Huntington–Ashland, WV-OH-KY CSA	637,500; 127,075 (OH)	Huntington–Ashland, WV-OH-KY MSA	365,965; 55,710 (OH)	Lawrence County, Kentucky	15,765
Charleston–Huntington–Ashland, WV-OH-KY CSA	637,500; 127,075 (OH)	Charleston, WV MSA	200,170	Kanawha County, West Virginia	172,381
Charleston–Huntington–Ashland, WV-OH-KY CSA	637,500; 127,075 (OH)	Charleston, WV MSA	200,170	Boone County, West Virginia	20,251
Charleston–Huntington–Ashland, WV-OH-KY CSA	637,500; 127,075 (OH)	Charleston, WV MSA	200,170	Clay County, West Virginia	7,538
Charleston–Huntington–Ashland, WV-OH-KY CSA	637,500; 127,075 (OH)	Portsmouth, OH μSA	71,365	Scioto County, Ohio	71,365
none		Wheeling, WV-OH MSA	134,089; 64,434 (OH)	Belmont County, Ohio	64,434
none		Wheeling, WV-OH MSA	134,089; 64,434 (OH)	Ohio County, West Virginia	40,496
none		Wheeling, WV-OH MSA	134,089; 64,434 (OH)	Marshall County, West Virginia	29,159
Pittsburgh–Weirton–Steubenville PA-OH-WV CSA	2,725,198; 63,597 (OH)	Pittsburgh, PA MSA	2,421,992	Allegheny County, Pennsylvania	1,225,035
Pittsburgh–Weirton–Steubenville PA-OH-WV CSA	2,725,198; 63,597 (OH)	Pittsburgh, PA MSA	2,421,992	Westmoreland County, Pennsylvania	349,324
Pittsburgh–Weirton–Steubenville PA-OH-WV CSA	2,725,198; 63,597 (OH)	Pittsburgh, PA MSA	2,421,992	Washington County, Pennsylvania	210,802
Pittsburgh–Weirton–Steubenville PA-OH-WV CSA	2,725,198; 63,597 (OH)	Pittsburgh, PA MSA	2,421,992	Butler County, Pennsylvania	200,169
Pittsburgh–Weirton–Steubenville PA-OH-WV CSA	2,725,198; 63,597 (OH)	Pittsburgh, PA MSA	2,421,992	Beaver County, Pennsylvania	166,032
Pittsburgh–Weirton–Steubenville PA-OH-WV CSA	2,725,198; 63,597 (OH)	Pittsburgh, PA MSA	2,421,992	Fayette County, Pennsylvania	123,021
Pittsburgh–Weirton–Steubenville PA-OH-WV CSA	2,725,198; 63,597 (OH)	Pittsburgh, PA MSA	2,421,992	Lawrence County, Pennsylvania	83,911
Pittsburgh–Weirton–Steubenville PA-OH-WV CSA	2,725,198; 63,597 (OH)	Pittsburgh, PA MSA	2,421,992	Armstrong County, Pennsylvania	63,698
Pittsburgh–Weirton–Steubenville PA-OH-WV CSA	2,725,198; 63,597 (OH)	Weirton–Steubenville, WV-OH MSA	112,468; 63,597 (OH)	Jefferson County, Ohio	63,597
Pittsburgh–Weirton–Steubenville PA-OH-WV CSA	2,725,198; 63,597 (OH)	Weirton–Steubenville, WV-OH MSA	112,468; 63,597 (OH)	Hancock County, West Virginia	27,729
Pittsburgh–Weirton–Steubenville PA-OH-WV CSA	2,725,198; 63,597 (OH)	Weirton–Steubenville, WV-OH MSA	112,468; 63,597 (OH)	Brooke County, West Virginia	21,142
Pittsburgh–Weirton–Steubenville PA-OH-WV CSA	2,725,198; 63,597 (OH)	Hermitage, PA μSA	107,860	Mercer County, Pennsylvania	107,860
Pittsburgh–Weirton–Steubenville PA-OH-WV CSA	2,725,198; 63,597 (OH)	Indiana, PA μSA	82,878	Indiana County, Pennsylvania	82,878
Parkersburg–Marietta–Vienna, WV-OH CSA	145,653; 58,389 (OH)	Parkersburg–Vienna, WV MSA	87,264	Wood County, West Virginia	82,385
Parkersburg–Marietta–Vienna, WV-OH CSA	145,653; 58,389 (OH)	Parkersburg–Vienna, WV MSA	87,264	Wirt County, West Virginia	4,879
Parkersburg–Marietta–Vienna, WV-OH CSA	145,653; 58,389 (OH)	Marietta, OH μSA	58,389	Washington County, Ohio	58,389
none		Defiance, OH μSA	38,292	Defiance County, Ohio	38,292
none		Gallipolis, OH μSA	29,072	Gallia County, Ohio	29,072
none		none		Holmes County, Ohio	44,970
none		none		Highland County, Ohio	43,823
none		none		Preble County, Ohio	40,664
none		none		Williams County, Ohio	36,549
none		none		Putnam County, Ohio	34,380
none		none		Jackson County, Ohio	32,817
none		none		Hardin County, Ohio	30,072
none		none		Adams County, Ohio	27,865
none		none		Henry County, Ohio	27,598
none		none		Pike County, Ohio	27,061
none		none		Meigs County, Ohio	21,587
none		none		Wyandot County, Ohio	21,567
none		none		Paulding County, Ohio	18,727
none		none		Noble County, Ohio	14,276
none		none		Harrison County, Ohio	14,070
none		none		Morgan County, Ohio	13,626
none		none		Monroe County, Ohio	12,994
none		none		Vinton County, Ohio	12,645
State of Ohio					11,900,510

The 44 core-based statistical areas of the State of Ohio (Note: For CBSAs comprising populations from multiple states, they are listed twice to show both their intrastate population within that CBSA as well as the CBSA's total population. Only the intrastate population is ranked.)
2025 rank	Core-based statistical area	Population				
2025 rank	Core-based statistical area	2025 estimate	Change	2020 Census	Change	2010 Census
1	Columbus, OH MSA	2,242,028	+4.82%	2,138,926	+12.46%	1,901,974
2	Cleveland, OH MSA	2,165,775	−0.92%	2,185,825	+0.33%	2,178,737
3	Cincinnati, OH-KY-IN MSA (OH)	1,757,101	+2.42%	1,715,610	+5.55%	1,625,406
4	Dayton–Kettering–Beavercreek, OH MSA	826,554	+1.54%	814,049	+1.85%	799,232
5	Akron, OH MSA	701,780	−0.06%	702,219	−0.14%	703,200
6	Toledo, OH MSA	599,376	−1.13%	606,240	−0.62%	610,001
7	Youngstown–Warren, OH MSA	423,678	−1.61%	430,591	−4.13%	449,135
8	Canton–Massillon, OH MSA	400,246	−0.33%	401,574	−0.70%	404,422
9	Springfield, OH MSA	135,340	−0.49%	136,001	−1.69%	138,333
10	Mansfield, OH MSA	124,893	−0.03%	124,936	+0.37%	124,475
11	Wooster, OH μSA	116,758	−0.12%	116,894	+2.07%	114,520
12	Sandusky, OH MSA	112,777	−2.77%	115,986	−2.13%	118,507
13	Lima, OH MSA	100,881	−1.30%	102,206	−3.88%	106,331
14	Salem, OH μSA	99,377	−2.45%	101,877	−5.53%	107,841
15	New Philadelphia–Dover, OH μSA	92,373	−0.95%	93,263	+0.74%	92,582
16	Zanesville, OH μSA	87,014	+0.70%	86,410	+0.39%	86,074
17	Chillicothe, OH μSA	76,429	−0.86%	77,093	−1.24%	78,064
18	Findlay, OH μSA	75,034	+0.15%	74,920	+0.18%	74,782
19	Portsmouth, OH μSA	71,365	−3.57%	74,008	−6.91%	79,499
21	Marion, OH μSA	65,115	−0.37%	65,359	−1.72%	66,501
20	Wheeling, WV-OH MSA (OH)	64,434	−3.10%	66,497	−5.54%	70,400
23	Mount Vernon, OH μSA	64,002	+2.04%	62,721	+2.95%	60,921
22	Weirton–Steubenville, WV-OH MSA (OH)	63,597	−2.53%	65,249	−6.40%	69,709
24	Athens, OH μSA	63,197	+1.23%	62,431	−3.59%	64,757
25	Fremont, OH μSA	58,655	−0.41%	58,896	−3.36%	60,944
26	Marietta, OH μSA	58,389	−2.31%	59,771	−3.25%	61,778
27	Norwalk, OH μSA	58,250	−0.54%	58,565	−1.78%	59,626
28	Huntington–Ashland, WV-KY-OH MSA (OH)	55,710	−4.34%	58,240	−6.74%	62,450
29	Tiffin, OH μSA	54,522	−0.99%	55,069	−2.95%	56,745
30	Ashland, OH μSA	52,523	+0.14%	52,447	−1.30%	53,139
31	Greenville, OH μSA	51,520	−0.70%	51,881	−2.04%	52,959
32	Sidney, OH μSA	48,065	−0.34%	48,230	−2.41%	49,423
33	Bellefontaine, OH μSA	46,302	+0.33%	46,150	+0.64%	45,858
34	Wapakoneta, OH μSA	45,909	−1.11%	46,422	+1.03%	45,949
35	Celina, OH μSA	42,737	+0.49%	42,528	+4.20%	40,814
36	Wilmington, OH μSA	42,301	+0.67%	42,018	−0.05%	42,040
37	Bucyrus, OH μSA	41,896	−0.31%	42,025	−4.02%	43,784
38	Urbana, OH μSA	38,820	+0.27%	38,714	−3.45%	40,097
39	Defiance, OH μSA	38,292	+0.02%	38,286	−1.92%	39,037
40	Cambridge, OH μSA	38,379	−0.15%	38,438	−4.11%	40,087
41	Coshocton, OH μSA	37,188	+1.57%	36,612	−0.78%	36,901
42	Gallipolis, OH μSA	29,072	−0.51%	29,220	−5.54%	30,934
43	Washington Court House, OH μSA	28,552	−1.38%	28,951	−0.27%	29,030
44	Van Wert, OH μSA	29,013	+0.28%	28,931	+0.65%	28,744
	Cincinnati, OH-KY-IN MSA	2,312,858	+2.80%	2,249,797	+5.62%	2,130,151
	Huntington–Ashland, WV-KY-OH MSA	365,965	−2.71%	376,155	−2.74%	386,768
	Weirton–Steubenville, WV-OH MSA	112,468	−3.79%	116,903	−6.07%	124,454
	Wheeling, WV-OH MSA	134,089	−3.89%	139,513	−5.70%	147,950

The 11 combined statistical area of the State of Ohio (Note: For CSAs comprising populations from multiple states, they are listed twice to show both their intrastate population within that CSA as well as the CSA's total population. Only the intrastate population is ranked.)
2025 rank	Combined statistical area	Population				
2025 rank	Combined statistical area	2025 estimate	Change	2020 Census	Change	2010 Census
1	Cleveland–Akron–Canton, OH CSA	3,743,802	−0.69%	3,769,834	+0.01%	3,769,439
2	Columbus–Marion–Zanesville, OH CSA	2,681,018	+2.86%	2,606,479	+9.83%	2,373,266
3	Cincinnati–Wilmington, OH-KY-IN CSA (OH)	1,799,402	+2.38%	1,757,628	+5.41%	1,667,446
4	Dayton–Springfield–Kettering, OH CSA	1,100,299	+1.05%	1,088,875	+0.82%	1,080,044
5	Youngstown–Warren–Salem, OH CSA	523,055	−1.77%	532,468	−4.40%	556,976
7	Mansfield–Ashland–Bucyrus, OH CSA	219,312	−0.04%	219,408	−0.90%	221,398
6	Lima–Van Wert–Celina, OH CSA	218,540	−0.70%	220,087	−0.79%	221,838
8	Charleston–Huntington–Ashland, WV-OH-KY CSA (OH)	127,075	−3.91%	132,248	−6.83%	141,949
9	Findlay–Tiffin, OH CSA	129,556	−0.33%	129,989	−1.17%	131,527
10	Pittsburgh–Weirton–Steubenville, PA-OH-WV CSA (OH)	63,597	−2.53%	65,249	−6.40%	69,709
11	Parkersburg–Marietta–Vienna, WV-OH CSA (OH)	58,389	−2.31%	59,771	−3.25%	61,778
	Charleston–Huntington–Ashland, WV-OH-KY CSA	637,500	−3.52%	660,768	−4.70%	693,345
	Cincinnati–Wilmington, OH-KY-IN CSA	2,355,159	+2.76%	2,291,815	+5.51%	2,172,191
	Parkersburg–Marietta–Vienna, WV-OH CSA	145,653	−2.42%	149,261	−3.36%	154,451
	Pittsburgh–Weirton–Steubenville, PA-OH-WV CSA	2,725,198	−1.54%	2,767,801	−0.34%	2,777,365

== See also ==
  - Demographics of Ohio
