= Plymouth Township, Ohio =

Plymouth Township, Ohio may refer to:

- Plymouth Township, Ashtabula County, Ohio
- Plymouth Township, Richland County, Ohio
