= Crestview High School =

Crestview High School may refer to:

- Crestview High School in Crestview, Florida
- Crestview High School in Ashland, Ohio
- Crestview High School in Columbiana, Ohio
- Crestview High School in Convoy, Ohio
