= Crestview Local School District =

Crestview Local School District may refer to:

- Crestview Local School District (Columbiana County), Ohio
- Crestview Local School District (Richland County), Ohio
- Crestview Local School District (Van Wert County), Ohio
