= Crestview High School (Ashland, Ohio) =

Location
- 1575 State Route 96; Ashland, Ohio 44805; United States; 40°53′30″N 82°27′35″W

Information
- NCES School ID: 390464302552
- Principal: Shawn Skelly
- Teaching staff: 23.00 (FTE)
- Grades: 9–12
- Enrollment: 355 (2024–25)
- Student to teacher ratio: 15.43
- Colors: Red, black, white
- Athletics conference: Firelands Conference
- Team name: Cougars
- Website: www.crestviewschools.net/o/chs

Crestview High School is a public high school in Weller Township, just west of Ashland, Ohio, United States. It is the only high school in the Crestview Local School District. The high school enrolled 355 students as of the 2024–25 academic year.

Crestview Local School District was created in 1962 as the result of a merging of Union School in Epworth and Savannah School in Savannah. The school serves a largely rural population of students from both Ashland and Richland Counties.

Crestview's school mascot is the cougar and the official colors are red and white, though black is commonly worn on uniforms. Red and black had been the official colors of Union High School, while green and white had been the official colors of the Savannah Sailors.

== Athletics ==
Students at Crestview High School can participate in sports such as: baseball, basketball, cheerleading, football, golf, soccer, swimming and diving, volleyball, wrestling, track, and cross country running. School clubs include: Spanish Club, Fellowship of Christian Athletes, Academic Challenge, Art Club, Gamer’s Club, Odyssey of the Mind, and the Red Glasses, among others.

The Cougars are members of the Firelands Conference, and in August 2014 became affiliates of the Mid-Buckeye Conference for girls soccer. They have one state championship which was accomplished by the golf team in 2012.

=== State championships ===
- Boys golf - 2012
