= Ganges, Ohio =

Unincorporated community in Ohio, U.S.

Coordinates: 40°54′22″N 82°33′41″W

Ganges is an unincorporated community in Richland County, in the U.S. state of Ohio.

== History ==
Ganges was originally called Trucksville, and under the latter name was platted in 1817 by William Trucks, and named for him. A post office was established under the name Truxville in 1821, the name was changed to Ganges in 1836, and the post office closed in 1906.
