= Olivesburg, Ohio =

- Unincorporated community
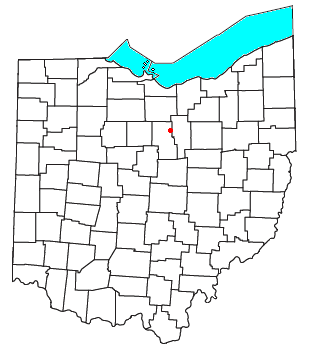
- Location of Olivesburg, Ohio
- Coordinates: 40°53′09″N 82°25′44″W
- Country: United States
- State: Ohio
- County: Richland
- Township: Weller
- Elevation: 1,073 ft (327 m)
- Time zone: UTC-5 (Eastern (EST))
  - Summer (DST): UTC-4 (EDT)
- GNIS feature ID: 1065203

Olivesburg is an unincorporated community in northeastern Weller Township, Richland County, Ohio, United States. It is part of the Mansfield Metropolitan Statistical Area. The town is on the bank of the Whetstone Creek, about two miles north of its junction with the Blackfork of the Mohican River. The community is served by the Ashland (44805) post office.

Today, the town consists of little more than a general store. It has an advertising sign posted for Olivesburg Dynamite, indicating the town once had a manufacturer of explosives. The store serves today as a convenience store selling to tourists visiting the Amish country of Ohio; they offer a t-shirt claiming Olivesburg is the Road Apple Capital.

Population of Olivesburg is officially posted on a state highway sign on as 813, though it would be hard to confirm since the same sign has been there since the early 1970s.

== Schools ==
The Olivesburg area is served by the Crestview Local School District located at 1545 State Route 96 in Richland County just a few miles west of Olivesburg. The independent school district boasts recently built Crestview High School, Crestview Middle School (located in the old high school) and recently built Crestview Elementary (which consolidated aging Savannah Elementary and Union Elementary schools) all located on the same campus.

== History ==
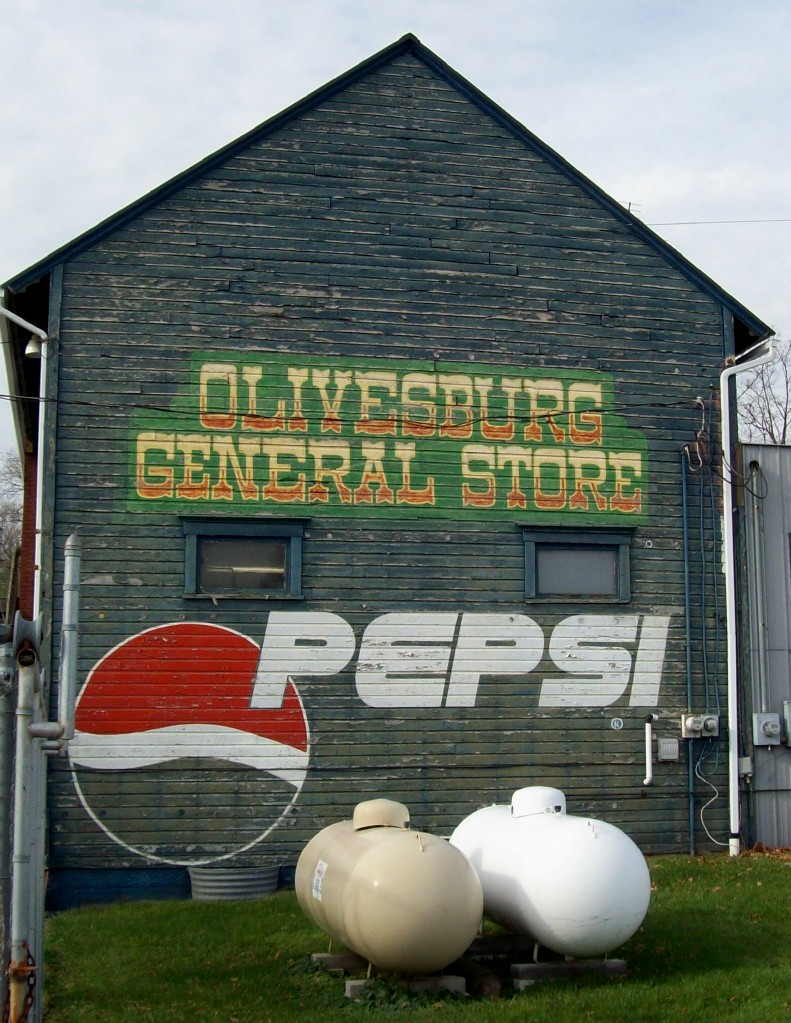
Olivesburg General Store Est.1840

Olivesburg was laid out by Benjamin Montgomery in 1816, and was named for his daughter, Olive. By 1821 Benjamin Montgomery's tavern had been joined by Abel Montgomery's blacksmith shop, John Gun's tailor shop, Thomas Beach's cabinet shop, and Joseph Burget's tannery.

The Olivesburgh post office was established in 1828 and the Oliveburg General Store claims to have been founded in 1840.

The 1873 county plat shows the town to be the principal village of Weller Township, and refers to it as Olivesburgh in the text, Olivesburg in the map. Any confusion about the spelling of the name was resolved 1890 by the United States Board on Geographic Names, which required that all burghs change their name to "burg" instead.

The Olivesburgh Post Office opened on February 6, 1828, changing its name to Olivesburg Post Office on August 8, 1893. The post office was closed on September 14, 1907, with mail handled by the Ashland Post Office.
