= Jackson Township, Richland County, Ohio =

Township in Ohio, US

- Township
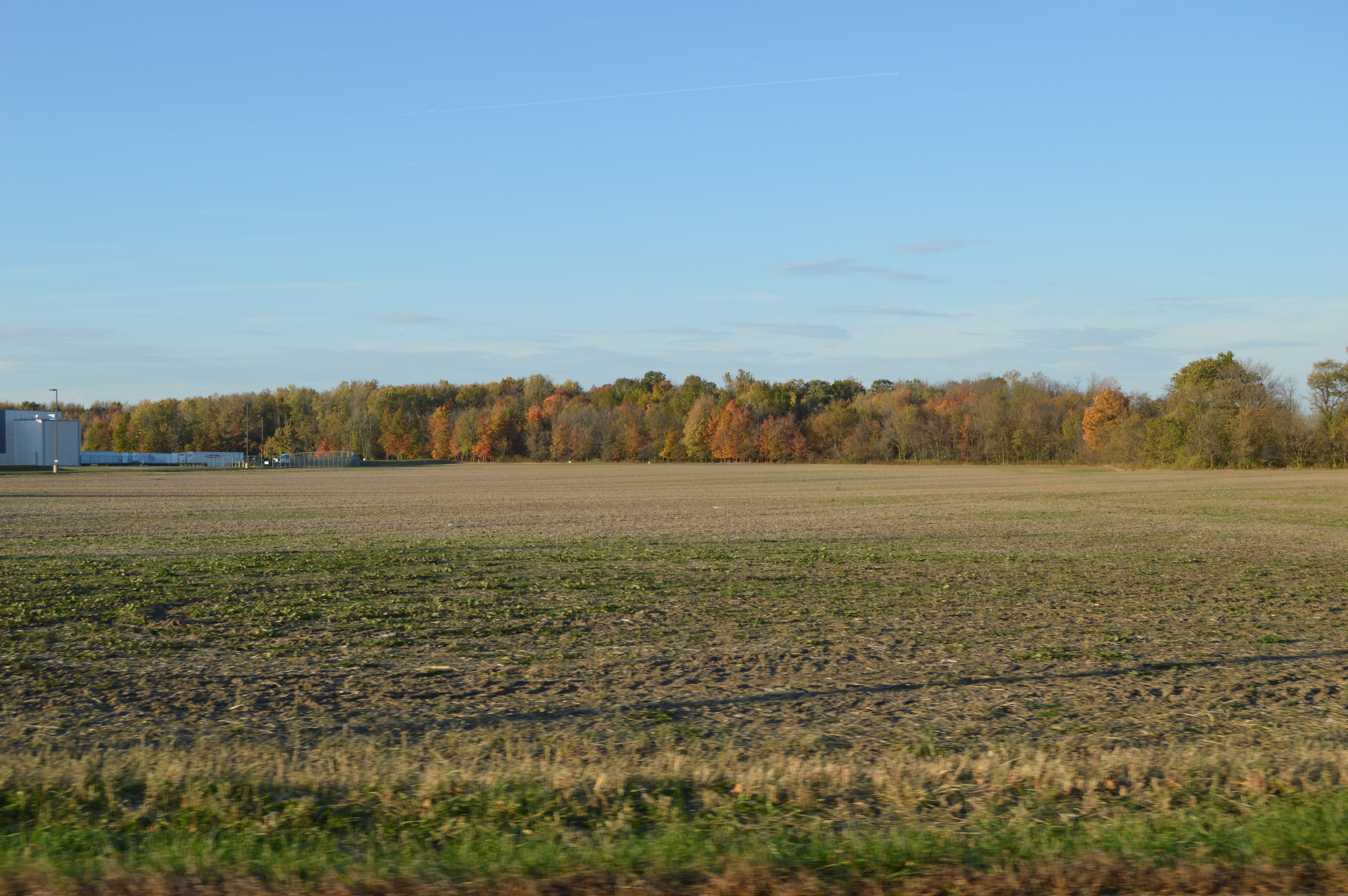
- Fields southeast of Shelby

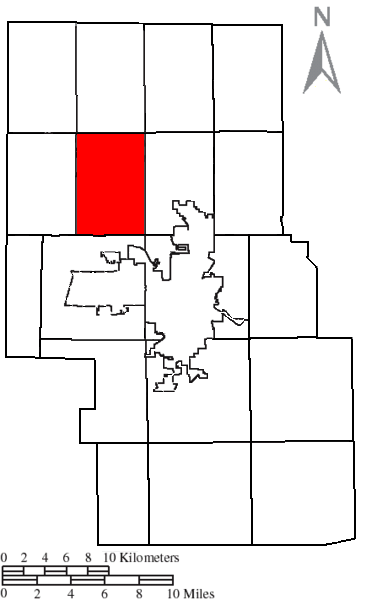
- Location of Jackson Township in Richland County.
- Coordinates: 40°51′40″N 82°37′12″W
- Country: United States
- State: Ohio
- County: Richland

Area
  - Total: 24.4 sq mi (63.3 km^{2})
  - Land: 24.4 sq mi (63.3 km^{2})
  - Water: 0 sq mi (0.0 km^{2})
- Elevation: 1,120 ft (340 m)

Population (2020)
  - Total: 3,700
  - Density: 150/sq mi (58/km^{2})
- Time zone: UTC-5 (Eastern (EST))
  - Summer (DST): UTC-4 (EDT)
- FIPS code: 39-38038
- GNIS feature ID: 1086876

Jackson Township is one of the eighteen townships of Richland County, Ohio, United States. It is a part of the Mansfield Metropolitan Statistical Area. The 2020 census found 3,700 people in the township.

== Geography ==
Located in the northwestern part of the county, it borders the following townships:

- Cass Township - north
- Blooming Grove Township - northeast corner
- Franklin Township - east
- Madison Township - southeast corner
- Springfield Township - south
- Sharon Township - west
- Plymouth Township - northwest corner

Part of the city of Shelby is located in northwestern Jackson Township.

== Name and history ==
It is one of thirty-seven Jackson Townships statewide.

== Government ==
The township is governed by a three-member board of trustees, who are elected in November of odd-numbered years to a four-year term beginning on the following January 1. Two are elected in the year after the presidential election and one is elected in the year before it. There is also an elected township fiscal officer, who serves a four-year term beginning on April 1 of the year after the election, which is held in November of the year before the presidential election. Vacancies in the fiscal officership or on the board of trustees are filled by the remaining trustees.
