= Jefferson Township, Richland County, Ohio =

Township in Ohio, US

- Township
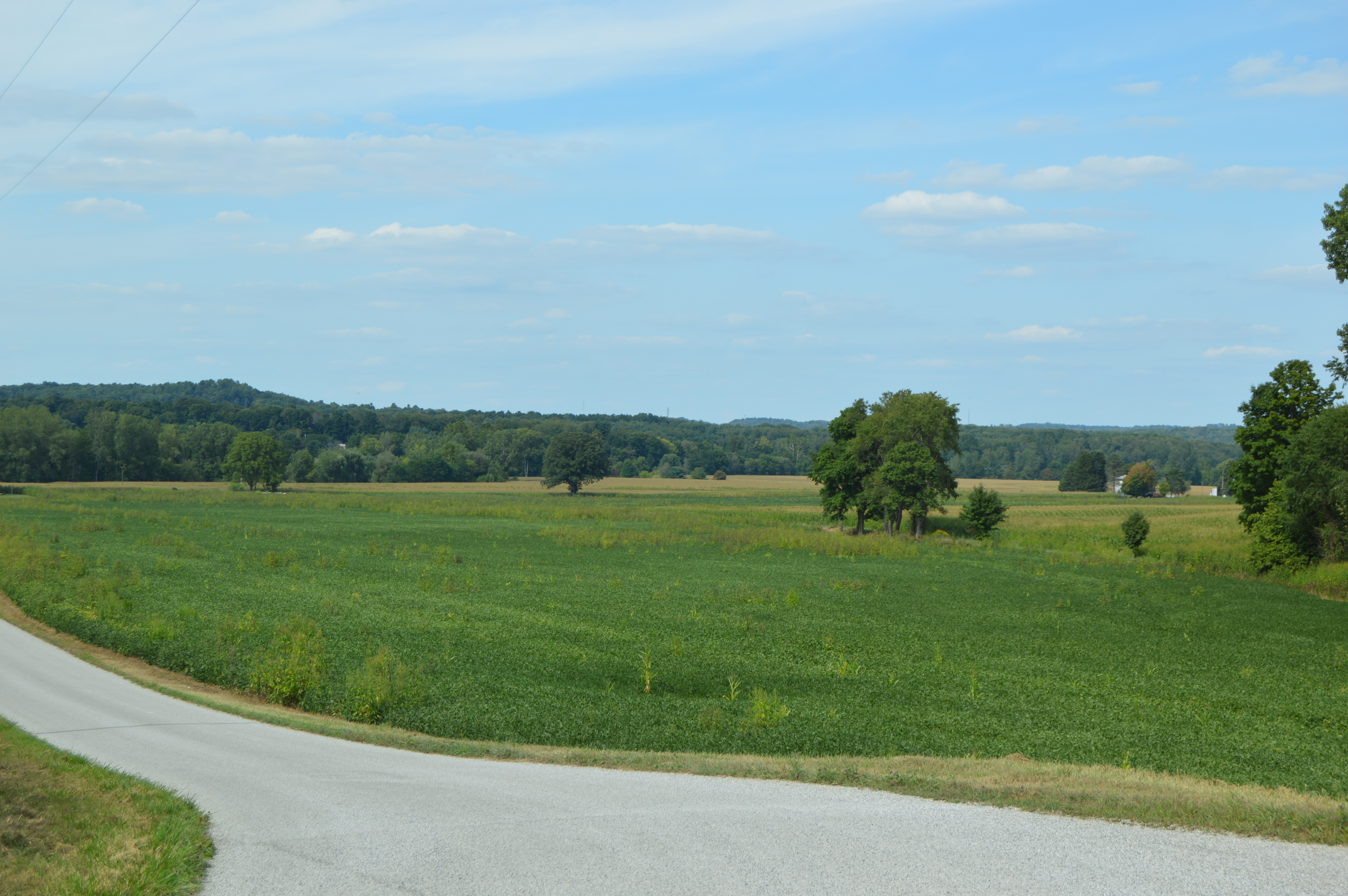
- Fields west of Bellville

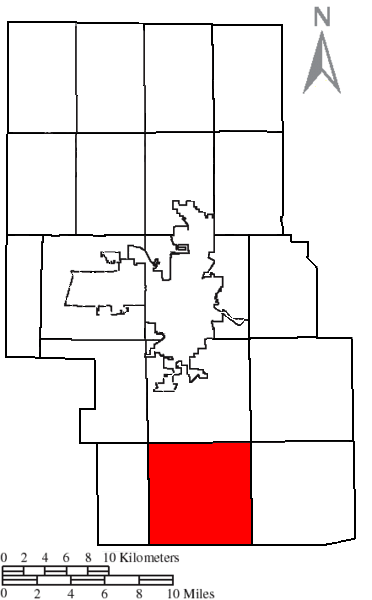
- Location of Jefferson Township in Richland County.
- Coordinates: 40°36′26″N 82°30′29″W
- Country: United States
- State: Ohio
- County: Richland

Area
  - Total: 36.5 sq mi (94.5 km^{2})
  - Land: 36.5 sq mi (94.5 km^{2})
  - Water: 0 sq mi (0.0 km^{2})
- Elevation: 1,243 ft (379 m)

Population (2020)
  - Total: 4,905
  - Density: 134/sq mi (51.9/km^{2})
- Time zone: UTC-5 (Eastern (EST))
  - Summer (DST): UTC-4 (EDT)
- FIPS code: 39-38794
- GNIS feature ID: 1086877

Jefferson Township is one of the eighteen townships of Richland County, Ohio, United States. It is a part of the Mansfield Metropolitan Statistical Area. The 2020 census found 4,905 people in the township.

== Geography ==
Located in the southern part of the county, it borders the following townships:

- Washington Township - north
- Monroe Township - northeast corner
- Worthington Township - east
- Pike Township, Knox County - southeast corner
- Berlin Township, Knox County - south
- Middlebury Township, Knox County - southwest
- Perry Township - west
- Troy Township - northwest corner

Part of the village of Bellville is located in northern Jefferson Township. Bangorville, an unincorporated community, is in the southwest corner of the township.

== Name and history ==
It is one of twenty-four Jefferson Townships statewide.

== Government ==
The township is governed by a three-member board of trustees, who are elected in November of odd-numbered years to a four-year term beginning on the following January 1. Two are elected in the year after the presidential election and one is elected in the year before it. There is also an elected township fiscal officer, who serves a four-year term beginning on April 1 of the year after the election, which is held in November of the year before the presidential election. Vacancies in the fiscal officership or on the board of trustees are filled by the remaining trustees.
