= Sharon Township, Richland County, Ohio =

Township in Ohio, US

- Township
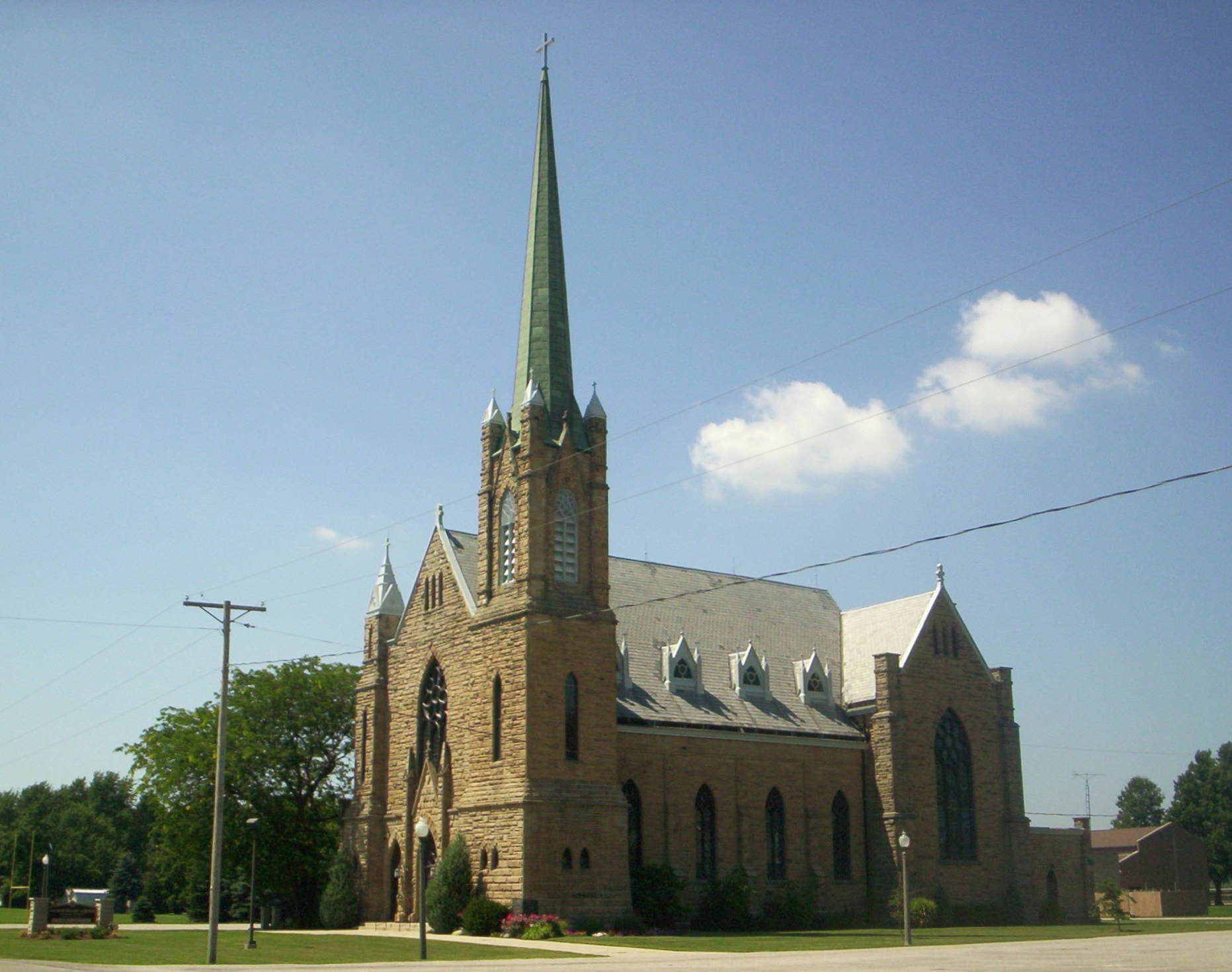
- Sacred Heart of Jesus Church

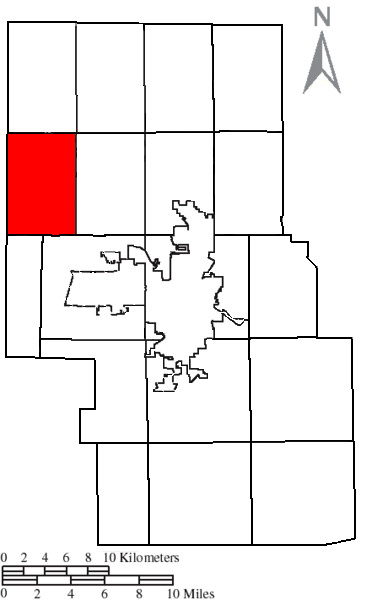
- Location of Sharon Township in Richland County.
- Coordinates: 40°52′38″N 82°40′10″W
- Country: United States
- State: Ohio
- County: Richland

Area
  - Total: 24.2 sq mi (62.6 km^{2})
  - Land: 24.1 sq mi (62.4 km^{2})
  - Water: 0.077 sq mi (0.2 km^{2})
- Elevation: 1,099 ft (335 m)

Population (2020)
  - Total: 9,006
  - Density: 374/sq mi (144.3/km^{2})
- Time zone: UTC-5 (Eastern (EST))
  - Summer (DST): UTC-4 (EDT)
- FIPS code: 39-71830
- GNIS feature ID: 1086885

Sharon Township is one of the eighteen townships of Richland County, Ohio, United States. It is a part of the Mansfield Metropolitan Statistical Area. The 2020 census found 9,006 people in the township.

== Geography ==
Located in the northwestern part of the county, it borders the following townships:

- Plymouth Township - north
- Cass Township - northeast corner
- Jackson Township - east
- Springfield Township - southeast
- Sandusky Township - south
- Jackson Township, Crawford County - southwest
- Vernon Township, Crawford County - west
- Auburn Township, Crawford County - northwest corner

Most of the city of Shelby is located in northeastern Sharon Township.

== Name and history ==
Statewide, other Sharon Townships are located in Franklin, Medina, and Noble counties.

== Government ==
The township is governed by a three-member board of trustees, who are elected in November of odd-numbered years to a four-year term beginning on the following January 1. Two are elected in the year after the presidential election and one is elected in the year before it. There is also an elected township fiscal officer, who serves a four-year term beginning on April 1 of the year after the election, which is held in November of the year before the presidential election. Vacancies in the fiscal officership or on the board of trustees are filled by the remaining trustees.
