= Perry Township, Richland County, Ohio =

Township in Ohio, US

- Township
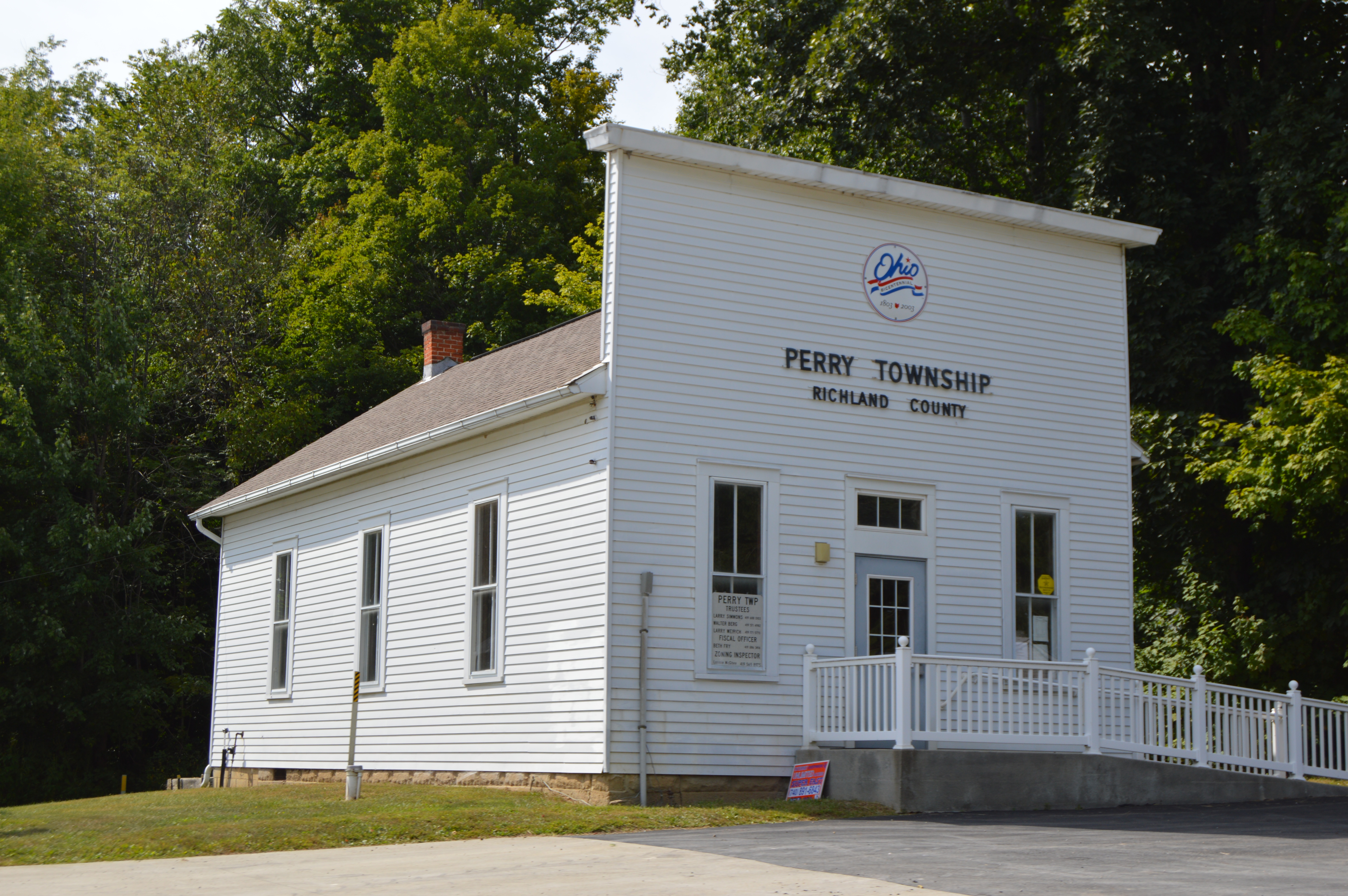
- Township hall at Darlington

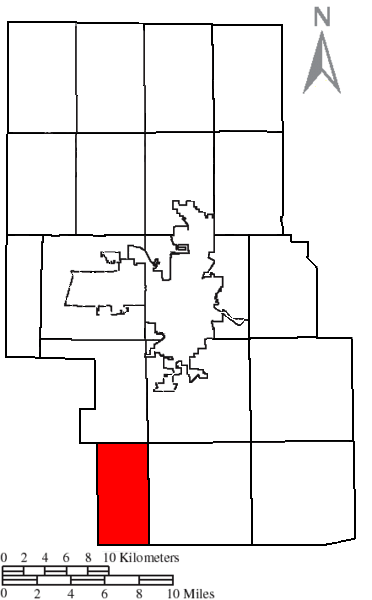
- Location of Perry Township in Richland County.
- Coordinates: 40°35′41″N 82°35′54″W
- Country: United States
- State: Ohio
- County: Richland

Area
  - Total: 18.0 sq mi (46.5 km^{2})
  - Land: 18.0 sq mi (46.5 km^{2})
  - Water: 0 sq mi (0.0 km^{2})
- Elevation: 1,300 ft (400 m)

Population (2020)
  - Total: 1,461
  - Density: 81.4/sq mi (31.4/km^{2})
- Time zone: UTC-5 (Eastern (EST))
  - Summer (DST): UTC-4 (EDT)
- FIPS code: 39-62050
- GNIS feature ID: 1086882

Perry Township is one of the eighteen townships of Richland County, Ohio, United States. It is a part of the Mansfield Metropolitan Statistical Area. The 2020 census found 1,461 people in the township.

== Geography ==
Located in the southwestern corner of the county, it borders the following townships:

- Troy Township - north
- Washington Township - northeast corner
- Jefferson Township - east
- Middlebury Township, Knox County - south
- Perry Township, Morrow County - west

No municipalities are located in Perry Township. The unincorporated community of Darlington is situated near the center of the township.

== Name and history ==
Perry Township was organized in 1816, then comprising two, 36-square-mile survey townships. At first called Leipsic (after the German city), the township was soon renamed Perry to honor Commodore Oliver Hazard Perry, who led a United States Navy squadron to victory against a British Royal Navy squadron in the 1813 Battle of Lake Erie. Perry Township was divided in 1825; the western half becoming Congress Township. Perry Township was again divided in 1848, when Morrow County, Ohio, was created. The western half was transferred to the new county, the eastern half remained in Richland County, and both halves retained the name Perry Township.

There are twenty-six Perry Townships statewide.

== Government ==
The township is governed by a three-member board of trustees, who are elected in November of odd-numbered years to a four-year term beginning on the following January 1. Two are elected in the year after the presidential election and one is elected in the year before it. There is also an elected township fiscal officer, who serves a four-year term beginning on April 1 of the year after the election, which is held in November of the year before the presidential election. Vacancies in the fiscal officership or on the board of trustees are filled by the remaining trustees.
