= Troy Township, Richland County, Ohio =

Township in Ohio, US

- Township
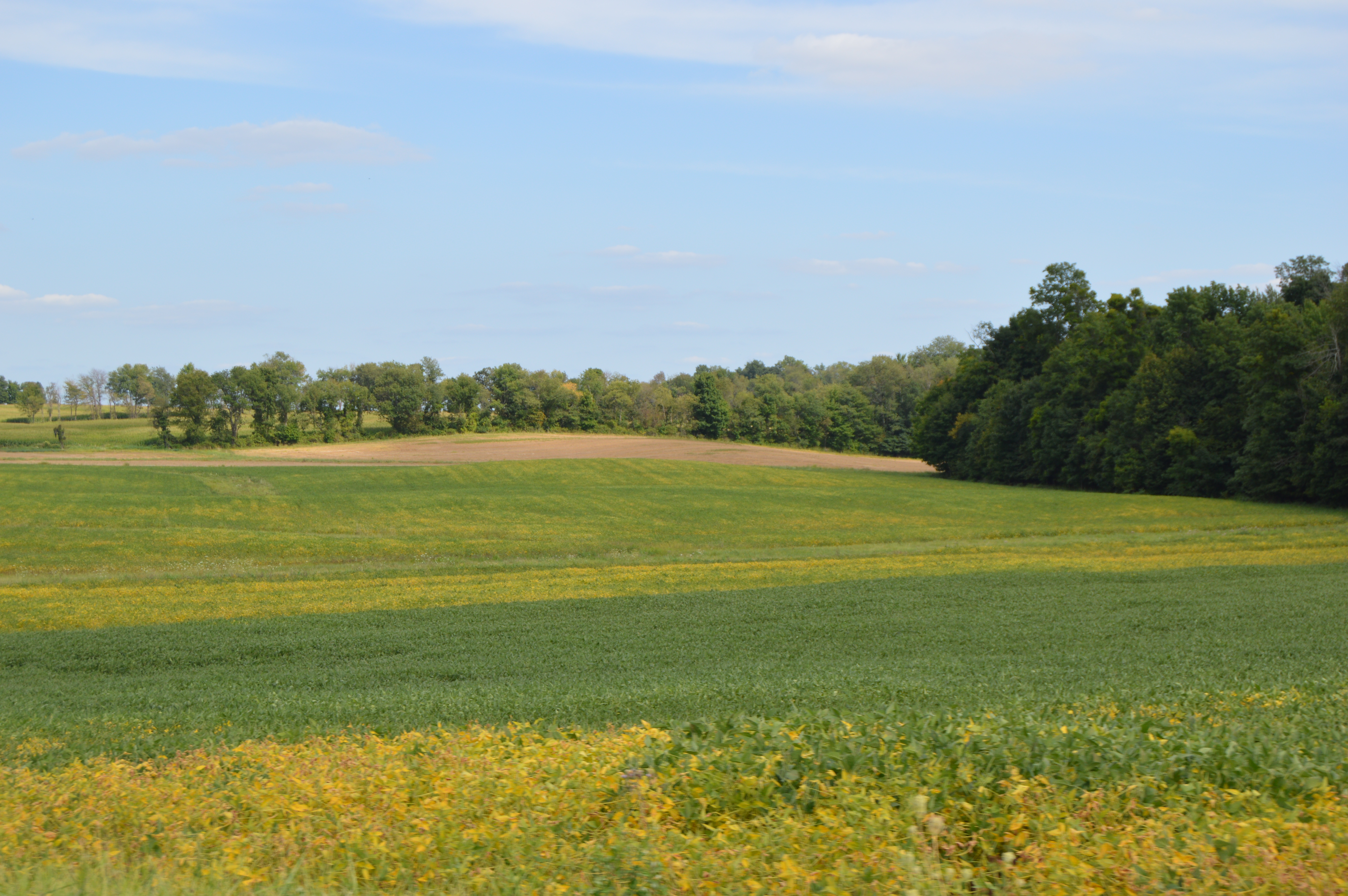
- Fields southwest of Lexington

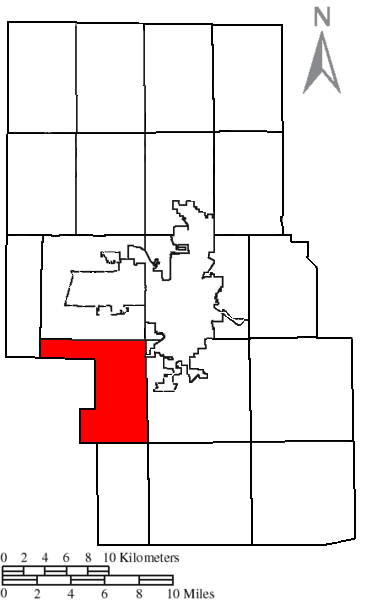
- Location of Troy Township in Richland County.
- Coordinates: 40°40′58″N 82°36′1″W
- Country: United States
- State: Ohio
- County: Richland

Area
  - Total: 23.5 sq mi (60.9 km^{2})
  - Land: 22.3 sq mi (57.8 km^{2})
  - Water: 1.2 sq mi (3.0 km^{2})
- Elevation: 1,180 ft (360 m)

Population (2020)
  - Total: 7,116
  - Density: 319/sq mi (123.1/km^{2})
- Time zone: UTC-5 (Eastern (EST))
  - Summer (DST): UTC-4 (EDT)
- FIPS code: 39-77616
- GNIS feature ID: 1086887
- Website: https://troyrichlandohio.org/

Troy Township is one of the eighteen townships of Richland County, Ohio, United States. It is a part of the Mansfield Metropolitan Statistical Area. The 2020 census found 7,116 people in the township.

== Geography ==
Located in the southwestern part of the county, it borders the following townships:

- Springfield Township - north
- Madison Township - northeast corner
- Washington Township - east
- Jefferson Township - southeast corner
- Perry Township - south
- Perry Township, Morrow County - southwest corner
- Troy Township, Morrow County - southwest
- North Bloomfield Township, Morrow County - west corner
- Sandusky Township - northwest

The village of Lexington is located in eastern Troy Township.

== Name and history ==
It is one of seven Troy Townships statewide.

== Government ==
The township is governed by a three-member board of trustees, who are elected in November of odd-numbered years to a four-year term beginning on the following January 1. Two are elected in the year after the presidential election and one is elected in the year before it. There is also an elected township fiscal officer, who serves a four-year term beginning on April 1 of the year after the election, which is held in November of the year before the presidential election. Vacancies in the fiscal officership or on the board of trustees are filled by the remaining trustees.

Law enforcement in Troy Township is carried out by the Richland County Sheriff's Office, while fire protection and emergency medical services are the responsibility of the Troy Township Fire Department.
