= Springfield Township, Richland County, Ohio =

Township in Ohio, US

- Township
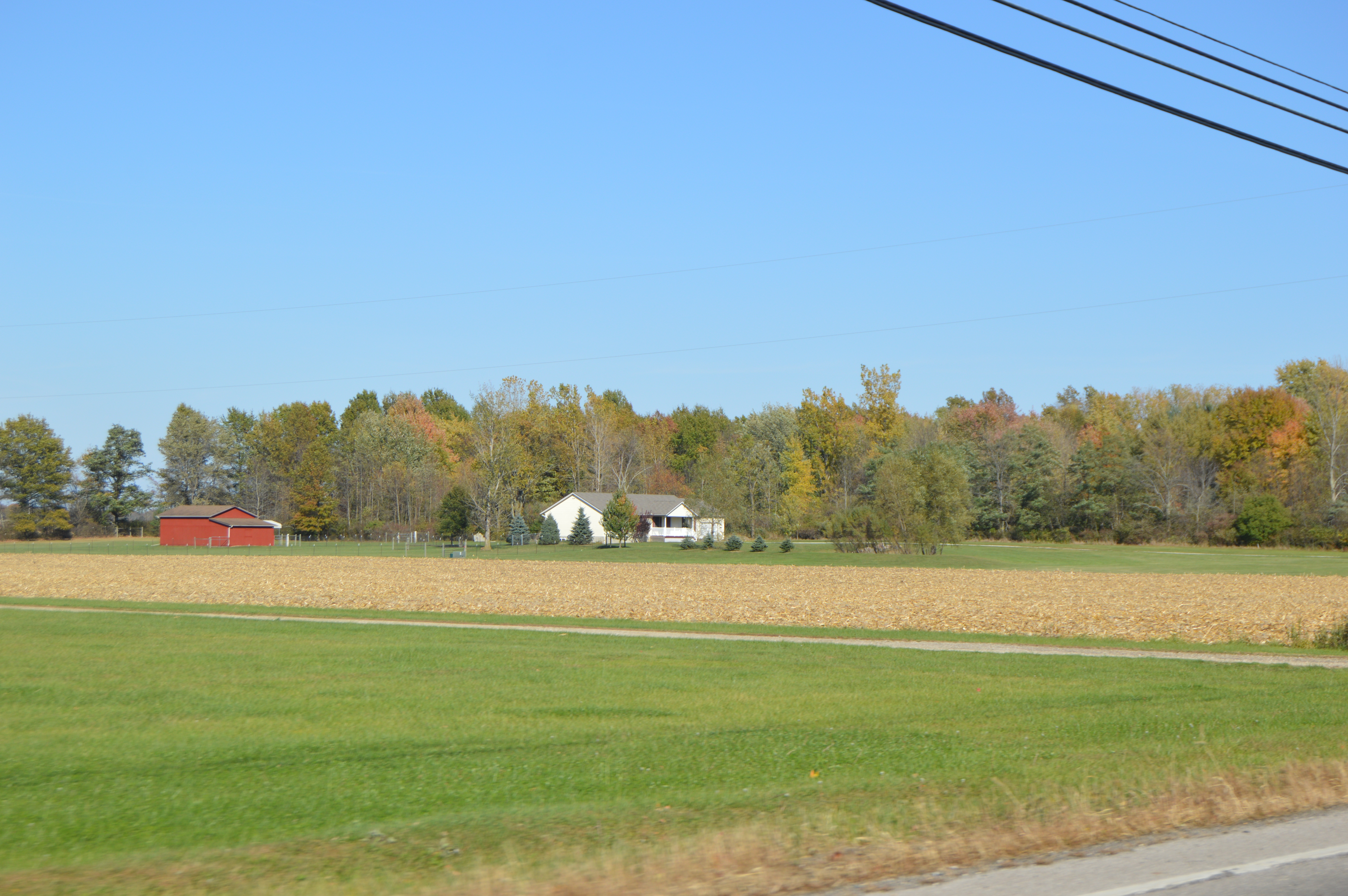
- Fields west of Ontario

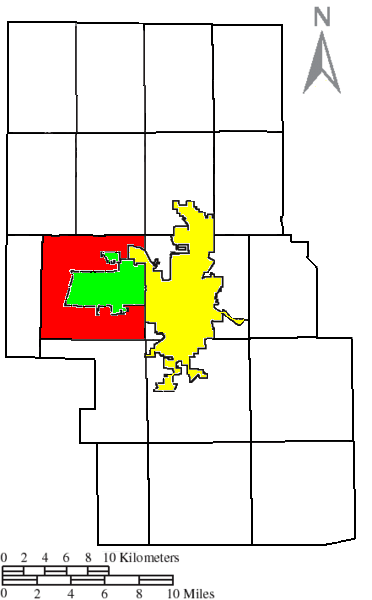
- Location of Springfield Township (red) in Richland County, next to the cities of Mansfield (yellow) and Ontario (green).
- Coordinates: 40°45′42″N 82°36′32″W
- Country: United States
- State: Ohio
- County: Richland

Area
  - Total: 36.6 sq mi (94.9 km^{2})
  - Land: 36.6 sq mi (94.8 km^{2})
  - Water: 0.039 sq mi (0.1 km^{2})
- Elevation: 1,355 ft (413 m)

Population (2020)
  - Total: 11,064
  - Density: 302/sq mi (116.7/km^{2})
- Time zone: UTC-5 (Eastern (EST))
  - Summer (DST): UTC-4 (EDT)
- FIPS code: 39-74128
- GNIS feature ID: 1086886
- Website: https://www.springfieldtwprc.org/

Springfield Township is one of the eighteen townships of Richland County, Ohio, United States. It is a part of the Mansfield Metropolitan Statistical Area. The 2020 census found 11,064 people in the township.

== Geography ==
Located in the western part of the county, it borders the following townships and Cities:

- Ontario City- Center of the Township
- Mansfield City-Northeast
- Jackson Township - north
- Franklin Township - northeast corner
- Madison Township - east
- Washington Township - southeast corner
- Troy Township - south
- Sandusky Township - west
- Sharon Township - northwest

Two cities are located in Springfield Township: part of Mansfield — the county seat of Richland County — in the northeast, and Ontario in the center.

According to the United States Census Bureau, the township has a total area of 36.6 square miles (58.9 km^{2}).All of the township is land and none of it is covered with water.

== Name and history ==
It is one of eleven Springfield Townships statewide.

== Government ==
The township is governed by a three-member board of trustees, who are elected in November of odd-numbered years to a four-year term beginning on the following January 1. Two are elected in the year after the presidential election and one is elected in the year before it. There is also an elected township fiscal officer, who serves a four-year term beginning on April 1 of the year after the election, which is held in November of the year before the presidential election. Vacancies in the fiscal officership or on the board of trustees are filled by the remaining trustees.

== Education ==
Most of Springfield Township shares the same school district with Ontario. Students attend Ontario Local Schools, and the high school is Ontario High School. The district is made up of the previous Springfield Township School district.
