= Sandusky Township, Richland County, Ohio =

Township in Ohio, US

- Township
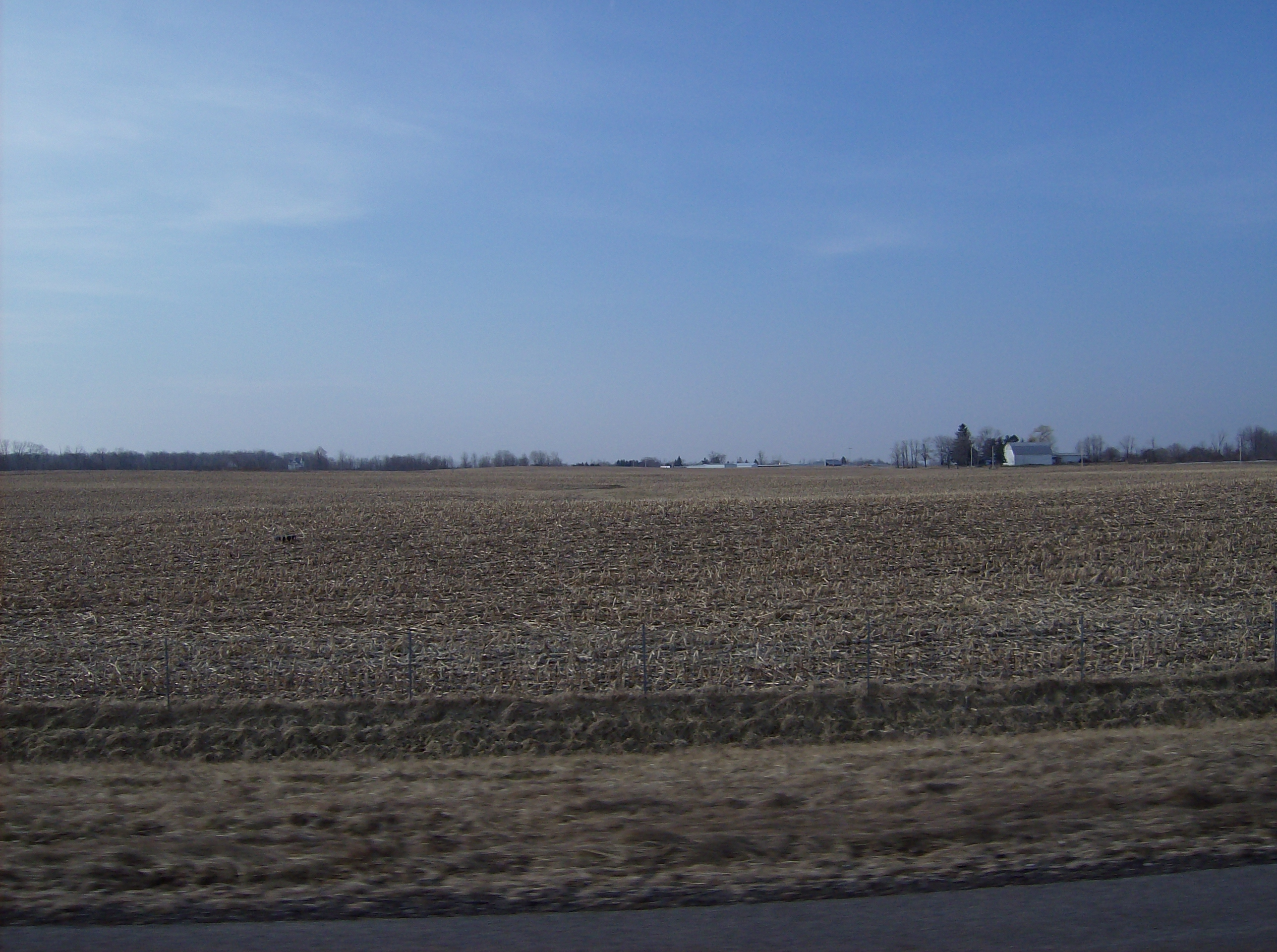
- Fields along U.S. Route 30

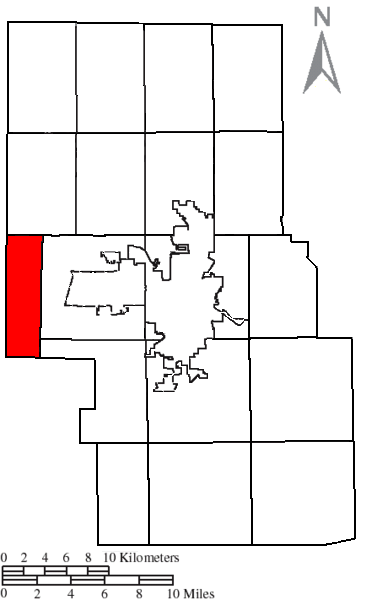
- Location of Sandusky Township in Richland County.
- Coordinates: 40°45′54″N 82°42′37″W
- Country: United States
- State: Ohio
- County: Richland

Area
  - Total: 14.3 sq mi (37.0 km^{2})
  - Land: 14.3 sq mi (37.0 km^{2})
  - Water: 0 sq mi (0.0 km^{2})
- Elevation: 1,188 ft (362 m)

Population (2020)
  - Total: 1,002
  - Density: 70.1/sq mi (27.1/km^{2})
- Time zone: UTC-5 (Eastern (EST))
  - Summer (DST): UTC-4 (EDT)
- FIPS code: 39-70394
- GNIS feature ID: 1086884

Sandusky Township is one of the eighteen townships of Richland County, Ohio, United States. It is a part of the Mansfield Metropolitan Statistical Area. The 2020 census found 1,002 people in the township.

== Geography ==
Located in the western part of the county, it borders the following townships:

- Sharon Township - north
- Springfield Township - east
- Troy Township - southeast, north of Troy Township, Morrow County
- Troy Township, Morrow County - southeast corner, north of Troy Township, Richland County
- North Bloomfield Township, Morrow County - south
- Polk Township, Crawford County - southwest
- Jackson Township, Crawford County - northwest

A small part of the city of Crestline is located in northwestern Sandusky Township along with a part of Galion City.

== Name and history ==
Statewide, other Sandusky Townships are located in Crawford and Sandusky counties.

== Government ==
The township is governed by a three-member board of trustees, who are elected in November of odd-numbered years to a four-year term beginning on the following January 1. Two are elected in the year after the presidential election and one is elected in the year before it. There is also an elected township fiscal officer, who serves a four-year term beginning on April 1 of the year after the election, which is held in November of the year before the presidential election. Vacancies in the fiscal officership or on the board of trustees are filled by the remaining trustees.
