= Blooming Grove Township, Ohio =

Township in Ohio, US

Bloominggrove Township, Richland County, Ohio
- Township
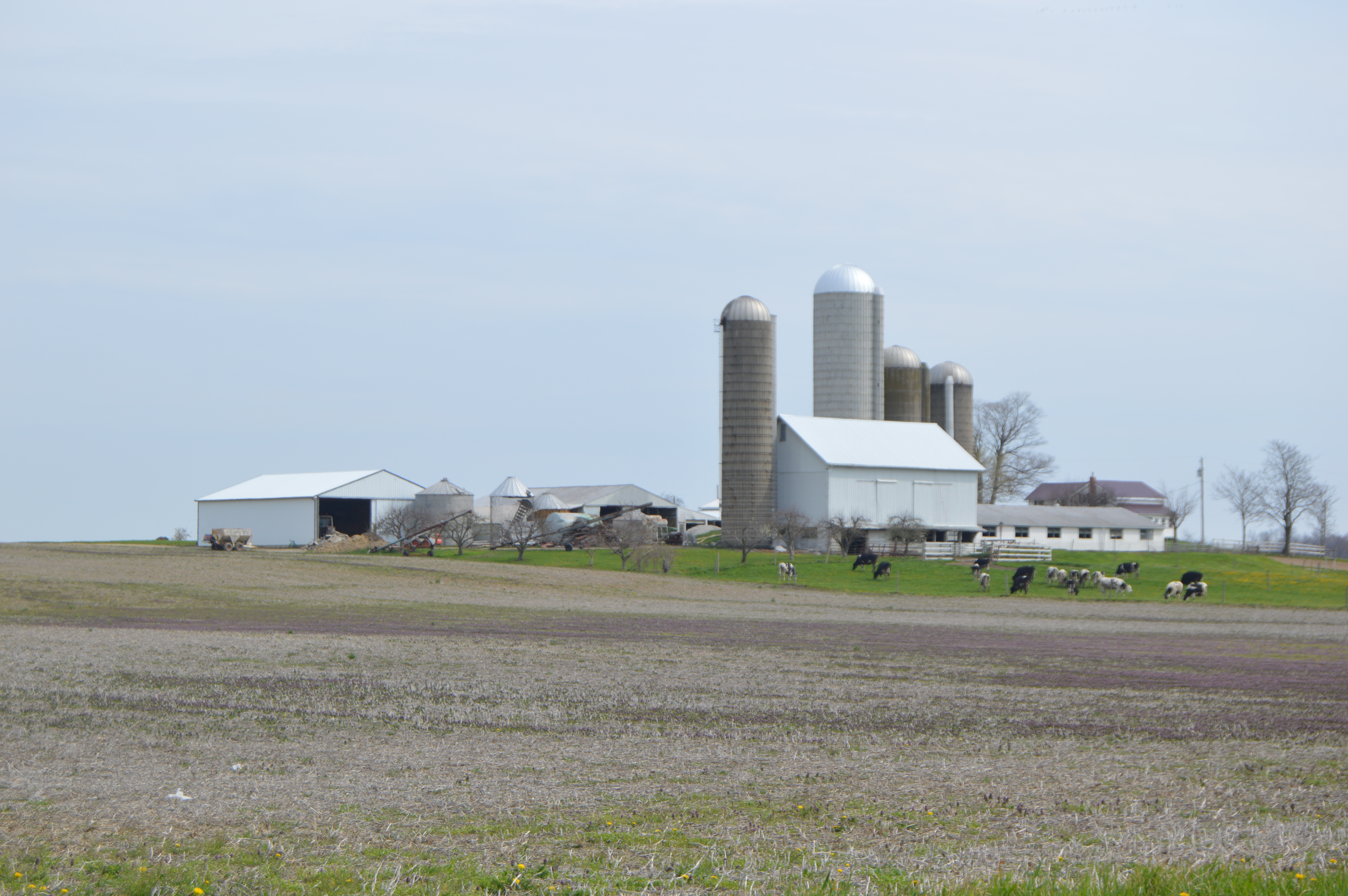
- Agricultural scene on Lattimer Road

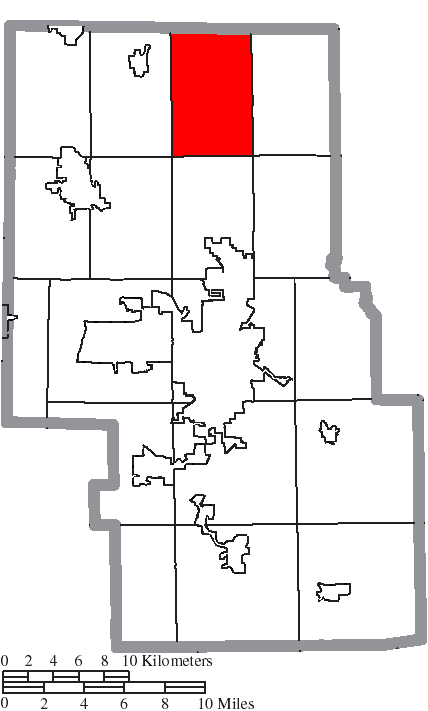
- Location of Bloominggrove Township in Richland County
- Coordinates: 40°56′51″N 82°32′01″W
- Country: United States
- State: Ohio
- County: Richland
- Organized: March 4, 1816

Area
  - Land: 25.256 sq mi (65.41 km^{2})
  - Water: 0.084 sq mi (0.22 km^{2})

Population (2020)
  - Total: 1,295
  - Density: 51.3/sq mi (19.8/km^{2})
- Time zone: UTC-5 (Eastern (EST))
  - Summer (DST): UTC-4 (EDT)
- FIPS code: 39-07230
- GNIS feature ID: 1086872

Blooming Grove Township is one of the eighteen townships of Richland County, Ohio, United States. There are two communities within the township, Ganges and Shenandoah. The township is a part of the Mansfield Metropolitan Statistical Area. The 2020 census found 1,295 people in the township.

== Geography ==
Located in the northern part of the county, it borders the following townships:

- Greenwich Township, Huron County - northeast
- Butler Township - east
- Weller Township - southeast corner
- Franklin Township - south
- Jackson Township - southwest corner
- Cass Township - west
- Ripley Township, Huron County - northwest

== Name and history ==
It is the only Blooming Grove Township statewide.

Blooming Grove Township was organized March 4, 1816, from two-thirds of Madison Township. Blooming Grove Township was reduced in extent by partitions which formed other townships. When Ashland County was formed in 1846, the western two columns of sections that had been a part of old Clear Creek Township were attached to make Blooming Grove six miles long by eight miles wide. When Butler Township was created on February 5, 1849, by combining the Clear Creek addition and two columns of sections from the east part of Blooming Grove, the township assumed its present size of six miles long by four miles wide.

== Government ==
The township is governed by a three-member board of trustees, who are elected in November of odd-numbered years to a four-year term beginning on the following January 1. Two are elected in the year after the presidential election and one is elected in the year before it. There is also an elected township fiscal officer, who serves a four-year term beginning on April 1 of the year after the election, which is held in November of the year before the presidential election. Vacancies in the fiscal officership or on the board of trustees are filled by the remaining trustees.
