= Cass Township, Richland County, Ohio =

Township in Ohio, US

- Township
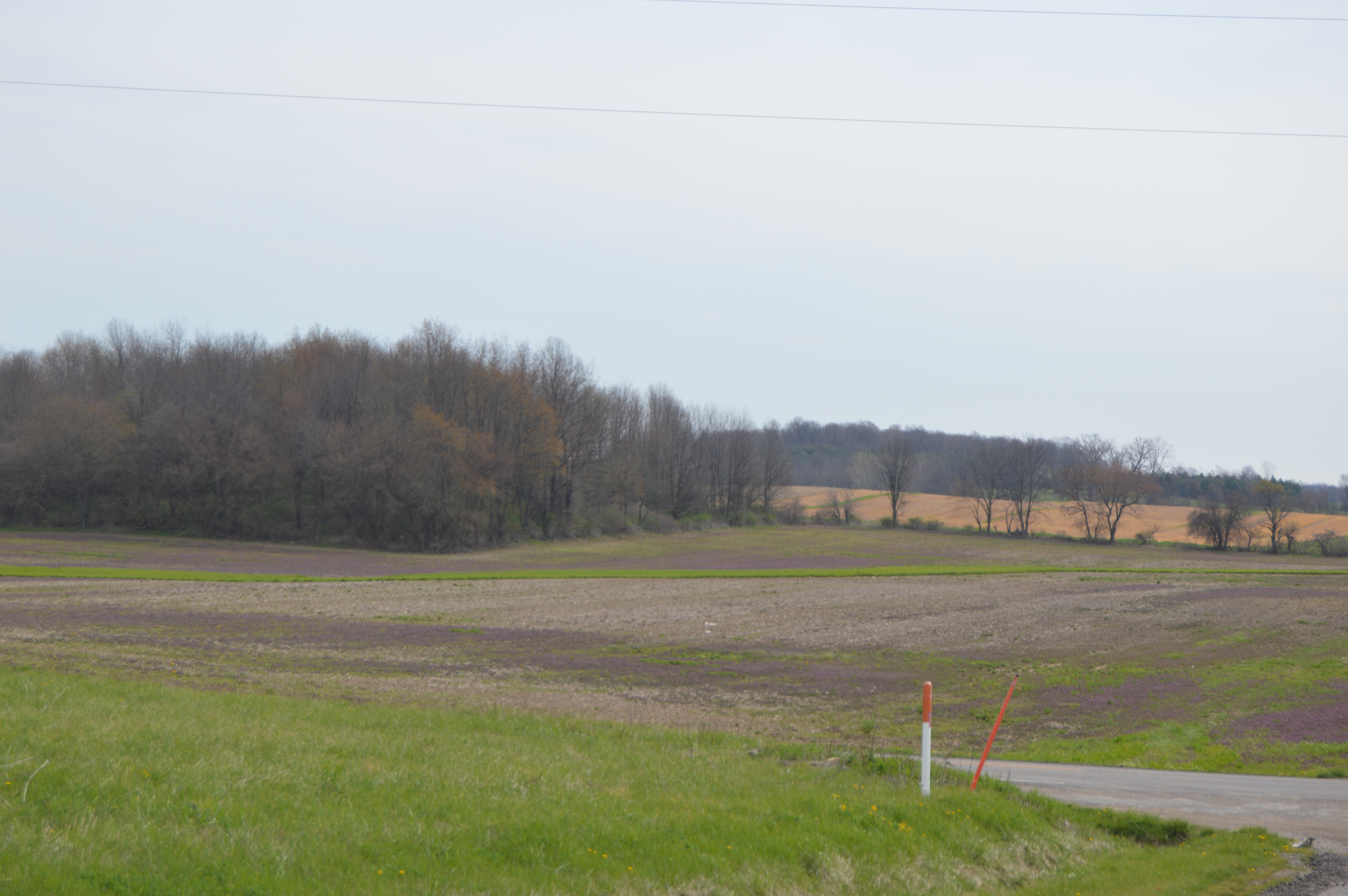
- Agricultural scene on Dinninger Road

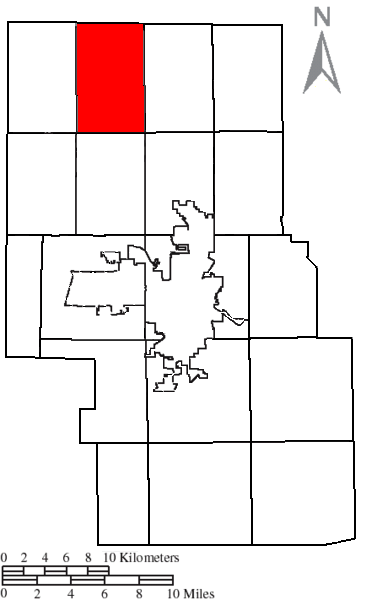
- Location of Cass Township in Richland County.
- Coordinates: 40°57′9″N 82°36′23″W
- Country: United States
- State: Ohio
- County: Richland

Area
  - Total: 25.8 sq mi (66.8 km^{2})
  - Land: 25.8 sq mi (66.8 km^{2})
  - Water: 0 sq mi (0.0 km^{2})
- Elevation: 1,080 ft (330 m)

Population (2020)
  - Total: 1,599
  - Density: 62.0/sq mi (23.9/km^{2})
- Time zone: UTC-5 (Eastern (EST))
  - Summer (DST): UTC-4 (EDT)
- FIPS code: 39-12420
- GNIS feature ID: 1086874

Cass Township is one of the eighteen townships of Richland County, Ohio, United States. It is a part of the Mansfield Metropolitan Statistical Area. The 2020 census found 1,599 people in the township.

== Geography ==
Located in the northwestern part of the county, it borders the following townships:

- Ripley Township, Huron County - northeast
- Blooming Grove Township - east
- Franklin Township - southeast corner
- Jackson Township - south
- Sharon Township - southwest corner
- Plymouth Township - west
- New Haven Township, Huron County - northwest

The village of Shiloh is located in northern Cass Township.

== Name and history ==
Statewide, other Cass Townships are located in Hancock and Muskingum counties.

== Government ==
The township is governed by a three-member board of trustees, who are elected in November of odd-numbered years to a four-year term beginning on the following January 1. Two are elected in the year after the presidential election and one is elected in the year before it. There is also an elected township fiscal officer, who serves a four-year term beginning on April 1 of the year after the election, which is held in November of the year before the presidential election. Vacancies in the fiscal officership or on the board of trustees are filled by the remaining trustees.
