= Plymouth Township, Richland County, Ohio =

Township in Ohio, US

- Township
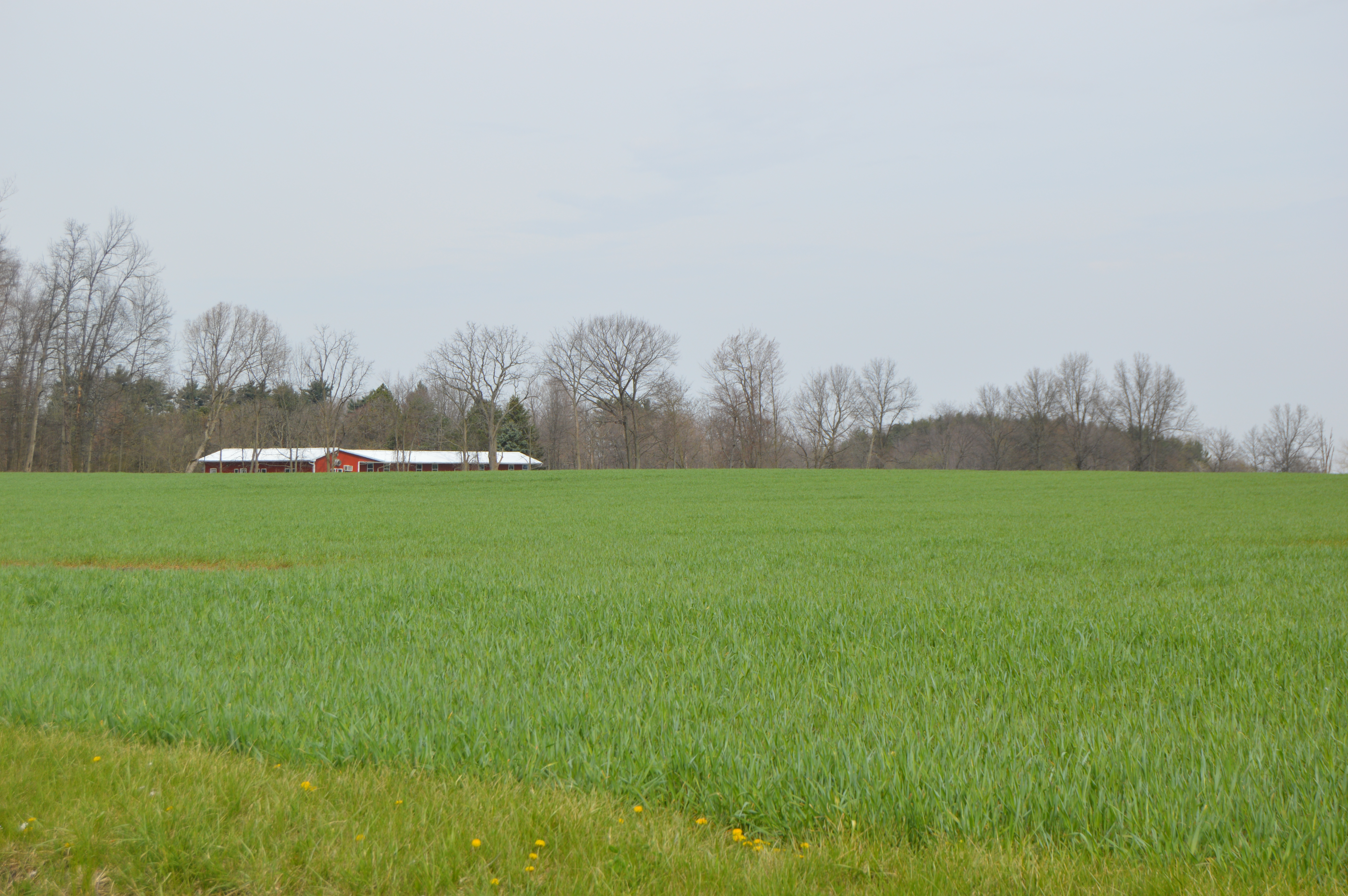
- Agricultural scene on Dinninger Road

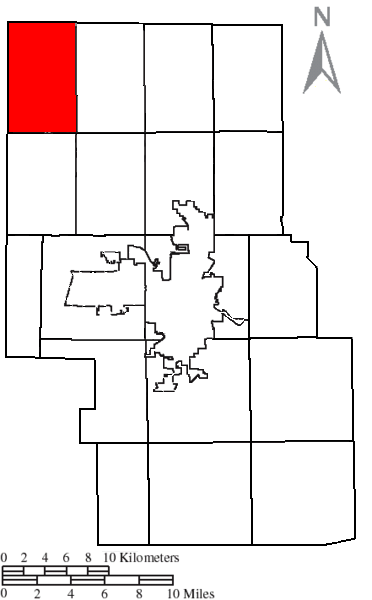
- Location of Plymouth Township in Richland County.
- Coordinates: 40°57′21″N 82°40′36″W
- Country: United States
- State: Ohio
- County: Richland

Area
  - Total: 25.9 sq mi (67.1 km^{2})
  - Land: 25.7 sq mi (66.6 km^{2})
  - Water: 0.15 sq mi (0.4 km^{2})
- Elevation: 1,010 ft (308 m)

Population (2020)
  - Total: 1,981
  - Density: 77/sq mi (29.7/km^{2})
- Time zone: UTC-5 (Eastern (EST))
  - Summer (DST): UTC-4 (EDT)
- FIPS code: 39-63814
- GNIS feature ID: 1086883

Plymouth Township is one of the eighteen townships of Richland County, Ohio, United States. It is a part of the Mansfield Metropolitan Statistical Area. The 2020 census found 1,981 people in the township.

== Geography ==
Located in the northwestern corner of the county, it borders the following townships:

- New Haven Township, Huron County - north
- Cass Township - east
- Jackson Township - southeast corner
- Sharon Township - south
- Vernon Township, Crawford County - southwest corner
- Auburn Township, Crawford County - west

Parts of two municipalities are located in Plymouth Township: the village of Plymouth in the north, and the city of Shelby in the southeast.

== Name and history ==
Statewide, the only other Plymouth Township is located in Ashtabula County.

== Government ==
The township is governed by a three-member board of trustees, who are elected in November of odd-numbered years to a four-year term beginning on the following January 1. Two are elected in the year after the presidential election and one is elected in the year before it. There is also an elected township fiscal officer, who serves a four-year term beginning on April 1 of the year after the election, which is held in November of the year before the presidential election. Vacancies in the fiscal officership or on the board of trustees are filled by the remaining trustees.
