= Franklin Township, Richland County, Ohio =

Township in Ohio, US

- Township
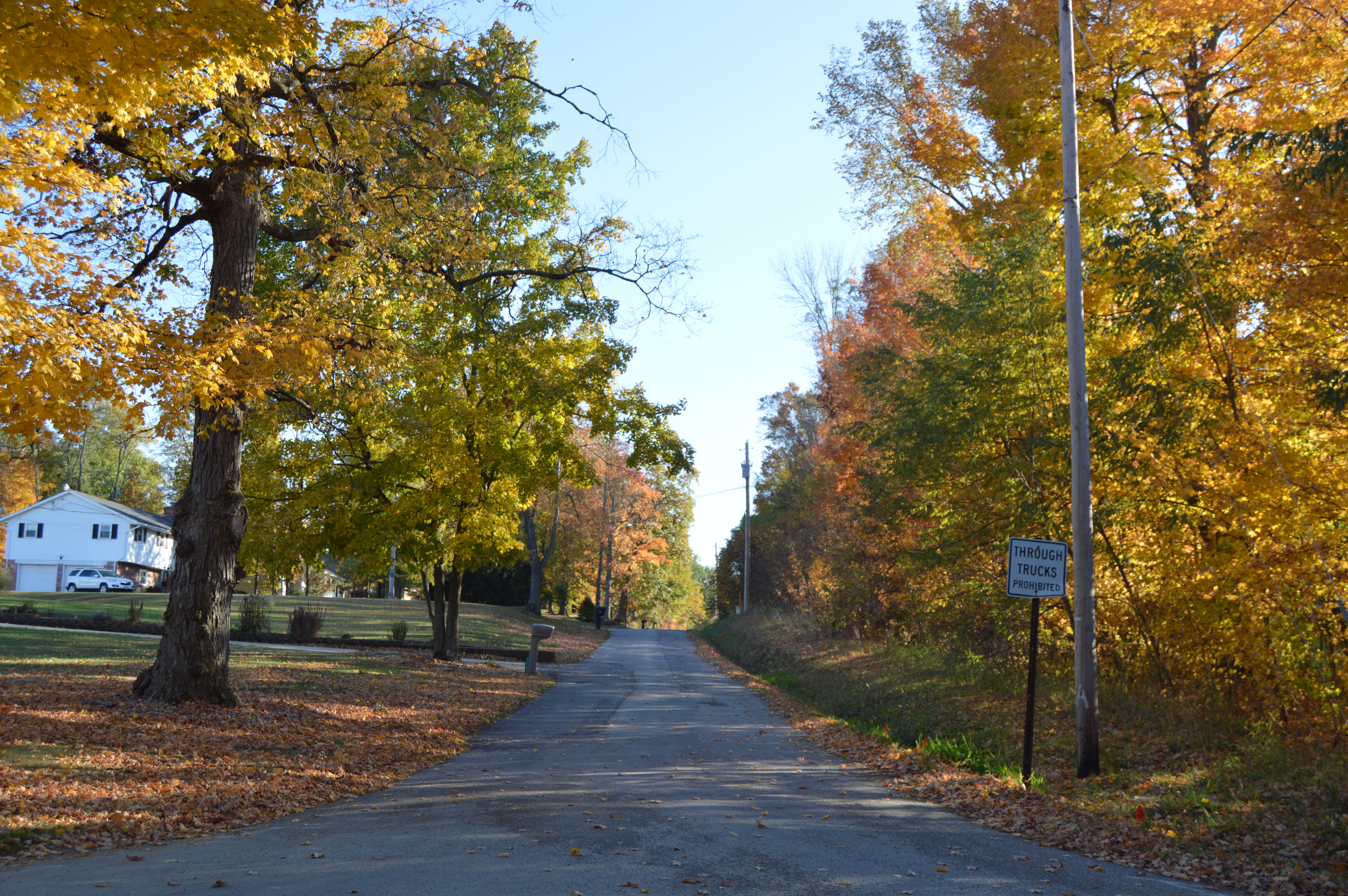
- Rural scene north of the Mansfield Lahm Regional Airport

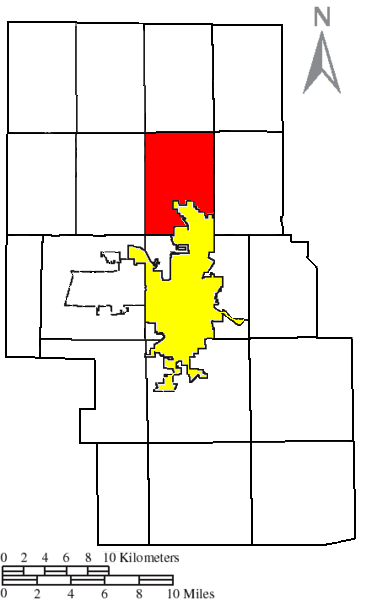
- Location of Franklin Township (red) in Richland County, next to the city of Mansfield (yellow).
- Coordinates: 40°51′37″N 82°32′21″W
- Country: United States
- State: Ohio
- County: Richland

Area
  - Total: 21.2 sq mi (54.9 km^{2})
  - Land: 21.2 sq mi (54.9 km^{2})
  - Water: 0 sq mi (0.0 km^{2})
- Elevation: 1,168 ft (356 m)

Population (2020)
  - Total: 1,679
  - Density: 79.2/sq mi (30.6/km^{2})
- Time zone: UTC-5 (Eastern (EST))
  - Summer (DST): UTC-4 (EDT)
- FIPS code: 39-28406
- GNIS feature ID: 1086875

Franklin Township is one of the eighteen townships of Richland County, Ohio, United States. It is a part of the Mansfield Metropolitan Statistical Area. The 2020 census found 1,679 people in the township.

== Geography ==
Located in the northern part of the county, it borders the following townships:

- Blooming Grove Township – north
- Butler Township – northeast corner
- Weller Township – east
- Madison Township – south
- Springfield Township – southwest corner
- Jackson Township – west
- Cass Township – northwest corner

Part of the city of Mansfield, the county seat of Richland County, is located in southern Franklin Township.

== Name and history ==
It is one of twenty-one Franklin Townships statewide. Franklin Township was formed on 4 June 1816 from a six mile square portion of southeast Blooming Grove Township. When Ashland County was formed, Franklin Township gained the two westernmost columns of Milton Township that remained in Richmond County. Weller Township was formed from the Milton sections plus two additional columns of sections from eastern Franklin, leaving the township in its present six mile long by four mile wide extent.

== Government ==
The township is governed by a three-member board of trustees, who are elected in November of odd-numbered years to a four-year term beginning on the following January 1. Two are elected in the year after the presidential election and one is elected in the year before it. There is also an elected township fiscal officer, who serves a four-year term beginning on April 1 of the year after the election, which is held in November of the year before the presidential election. Vacancies in the fiscal officership or on the board of trustees are filled by the remaining trustees.
