= Richland County, Ohio =

County in Ohio, United States

- County
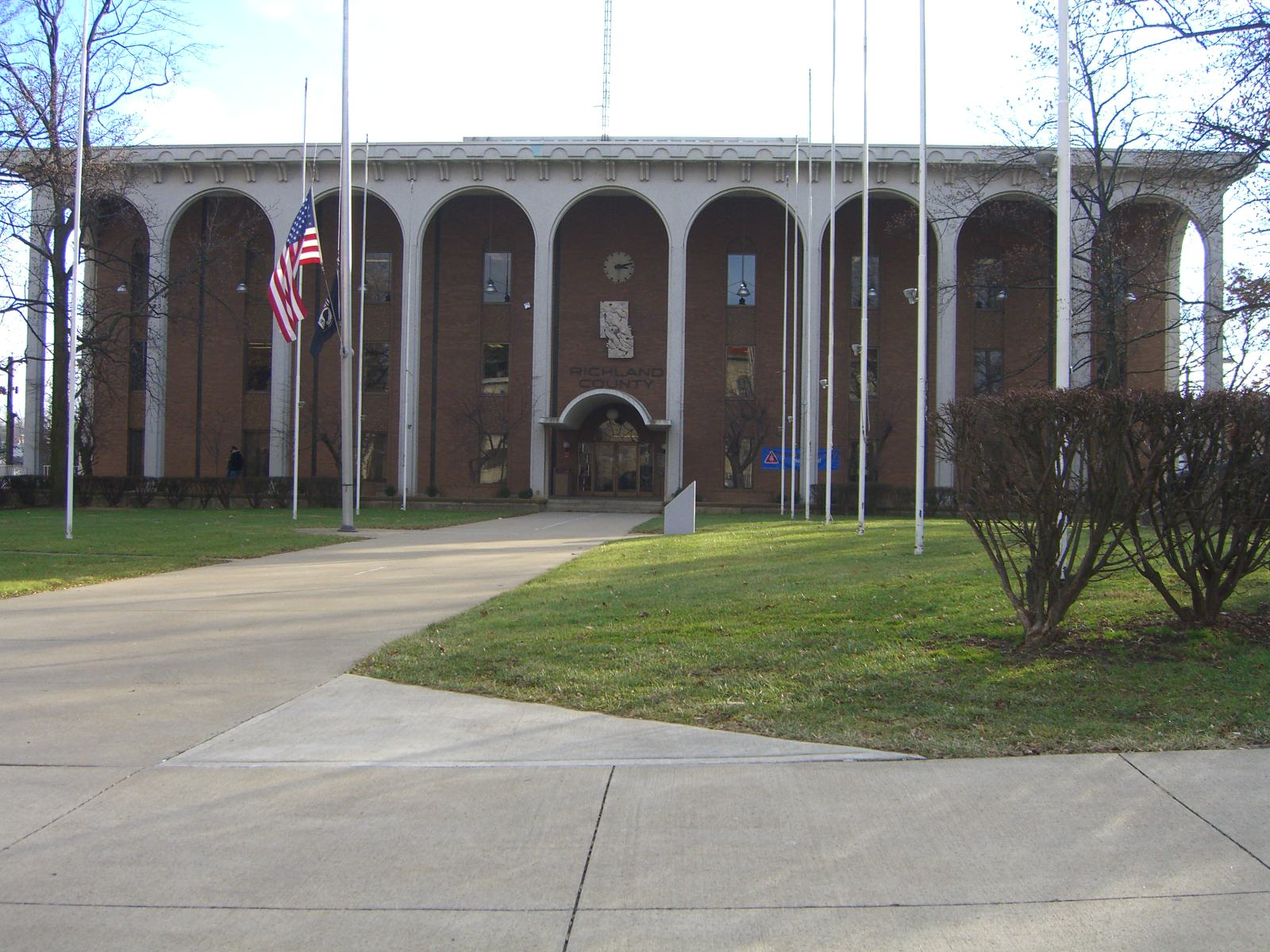
- Richland County Courthouse

- Flag Seal

- Location within the U.S. state of Ohio
- Coordinates: 40°47′N 82°32′W
- Country: United States
- State: Ohio
- Founded: March 1, 1813
- Named for: their fertile soil
- Seat: Mansfield
- Largest city: Mansfield

Area
  - Total: 500 sq mi (1,300 km^{2})
  - Land: 495 sq mi (1,280 km^{2})
  - Water: 4.8 sq mi (12 km^{2}) 1.0%

Population (2020)
  - Total: 124,936
  - Estimate (2025): 124,893 ▼
  - Density: 250/sq mi (97/km^{2})
- Time zone: UTC−5 (Eastern)
  - Summer (DST): UTC−4 (EDT)
- Congressional district: 4th
- Website: www.richlandcountyoh.gov

Richland County is a county located in the U.S. state of Ohio. As of the 2020 census, the population was 124,936. Its county seat is Mansfield. The county was created in 1808 and later organized in 1813. It is named for the fertile soil found there. Richland County is included in the Mansfield, OH Metropolitan Statistical Area as well as the Mansfield-Ashland-Bucyrus, OH Combined Statistical Area. The county is one of the six Metropolitan Statistical Areas that make up Northeast Ohio.

== History ==
At its formation in 1806 Richland County encompassed a larger area. The land was mainly forest. Settlers cleared the land for farming and the population increased. When Ashland County was formed on February 24, 1846, most of its area was provided by townships annexed in whole (such as Green Township) or in part (Clear Creek, Milton and Mifflin townships) from eastern Richland County.

== Geography ==
According to the U.S. Census Bureau, the county has a total area of 500 square miles (1,300 km^{2}), of which 495 square miles (1,280 km^{2}) is land and 4.8 square miles (12 km^{2}) (1.0%) is water.

=== Adjacent counties ===
- Huron County (north)
- Ashland County (east)
- Knox County (south)
- Morrow County (southwest)
- Crawford County (west)

== Demographics ==
Historical population
Census	Pop.	Note	%±
1820	9,169		—
1830	24,006		161.8%
1840	44,532		85.5%
1850	30,879		−30.7%
1860	31,158		0.9%
1870	32,516		4.4%
1880	36,306		11.7%
1890	38,072		4.9%
1900	44,289		16.3%
1910	47,667		7.6%
1920	55,178		15.8%
1930	65,902		19.4%
1940	73,853		12.1%
1950	91,305		23.6%
1960	117,761		29.0%
1970	129,997		10.4%
1980	131,205		0.9%
1990	126,137		−3.9%
2000	128,852		2.2%
2010	124,475		−3.4%
2020	124,936		0.4%
2025 (est.)	124,893	▼	0.0%
U.S. Decennial Census; 1790-1960 1900-1990; 1990-2000 2020

=== 2020 census ===
As of the 2020 census, the county had a population of 124,936. The median age was 41.7 years. 21.7% of residents were under the age of 18 and 20.2% of residents were 65 years of age or older. For every 100 females there were 103.3 males, and for every 100 females age 18 and over there were 102.8 males age 18 and over.

The racial makeup of the county was 84.2% White, 9.1% Black or African American, 0.2% American Indian and Alaska Native, 0.6% Asian, <0.1% Native Hawaiian and Pacific Islander, 0.8% from some other race, and 5.1% from two or more races. Hispanic or Latino residents of any race comprised 2.1% of the population.

66.3% of residents lived in urban areas, while 33.7% lived in rural areas.

There were 50,303 households in the county, of which 27.1% had children under the age of 18 living in them. Of all households, 44.9% were married-couple households, 18.9% were households with a male householder and no spouse or partner present, and 28.8% were households with a female householder and no spouse or partner present. About 31.4% of all households were made up of individuals and 14.5% had someone living alone who was 65 years of age or older.

There were 54,522 housing units, of which 7.7% were vacant. Among occupied housing units, 66.2% were owner-occupied and 33.8% were renter-occupied. The homeowner vacancy rate was 1.2% and the rental vacancy rate was 7.9%.

=== Racial and ethnic composition ===
Richland County, Ohio – Racial and ethnic composition Note: the US Census treats Hispanic/Latino as an ethnic category. This table excludes Latinos from the racial categories and assigns them to a separate category. Hispanics/Latinos may be of any race.
Race / Ethnicity (NH = Non-Hispanic)	Pop 1980	Pop 1990	Pop 2000	Pop 2010	Pop 2020	% 1980	% 1990	% 2000	% 2010	% 2020
White alone (NH)	120,326	114,444	112,910	107,726	104,231	91.71%	90.73%	87.63%	86.54%	83.43%
Black or African American alone (NH)	9,245	9,914	12,082	11,612	11,216	7.05%	7.86%	9.38%	9.33%	8.98%
Native American or Alaska Native alone (NH)	135	217	247	218	192	0.10%	0.17%	0.19%	0.18%	0.15%
Asian alone (NH)	365	572	651	800	791	0.28%	0.45%	0.51%	0.64%	0.63%
Native Hawaiian or Pacific Islander alone (NH)	x	x	33	32	58	x	x	0.03%	0.03%	0.05%
Other race alone (NH)	144	87	171	153	473	0.11%	0.07%	0.13%	0.12%	0.38%
Mixed race or Multiracial (NH)	x	x	1,558	2,202	5,360	x	x	1.21%	1.77%	4.29%
Hispanic or Latino (any race)	990	903	1,200	1,732	2,615	0.75%	0.72%	0.93%	1.39%	2.09%
Total	131,205	126,137	128,852	124,475	124,936	100.00%	100.00%	100.00%	100.00%	100.00%

=== 2010 census ===
As of the 2010 United States census, there were 124,475 people, 48,921 households, and 32,510 families living in the county. The population density was 251.3 inhabitants per square mile (97.0/km^{2}). There were 54,599 housing units at an average density of 110.2 units per square mile (42.5 units/km^{2}). The racial makeup of the county was 87.5% white, 9.4% black or African American, 0.6% Asian, 0.2% American Indian, 0.4% from other races, and 1.9% from two or more races. Those of Hispanic or Latino origin made up 1.4% of the population. In terms of ancestry, 30.6% were German, 13.3% were Irish, 12.6% were English, and 8.0% were American.

Of the 48,921 households, 29.9% had children under the age of 18 living with them, 49.7% were married couples living together, 12.5% had a female householder with no husband present, 33.5% were non-families, and 28.8% of all households were made up of individuals. The average household size was 2.40 and the average family size was 2.93. The median age was 40.9 years.

The median income for a household in the county was $42,664 and the median income for a family was $54,637. Males had a median income of $42,919 versus $31,228 for females. The per capita income for the county was $21,459. About 8.6% of families and 12.4% of the population were below the poverty line, including 18.9% of those under age 18 and 8.2% of those age 65 or over.

=== 2000 census ===
As of the census of 2000, there were 128,852 people, 49,534 households, and 34,277 families living in the county. The population density was 259 people per square mile (100 people/km^{2}). There were 53,062 housing units at an average density of 107 units per square mile (41/km^{2}). The racial makeup of the county was 88.16% White, 9.43% Black or African American, 0.20% Native American, 0.51% Asian, 0.03% Pacific Islander, 0.38% from other races, and 1.28% from two or more races. 0.93% of the population were Hispanic or Latino of any race. 96.0% spoke English, 1.2% German and 1.2% Spanish as their first language.

There were 49,534 households, out of which 30.90% had children under the age of 18 living with them, 54.30% were married couples living together, 11.40% had a female householder with no husband present, and 30.80% were non-families. 26.50% of all households were made up of individuals, and 10.90% had someone living alone who was 65 years of age or older. The average household size was 2.47 and the average family size was 2.98.

In the county, the population was spread out, with 24.80% under the age of 18, 8.40% from 18 to 24, 28.60% from 25 to 44, 24.10% from 45 to 64, and 14.20% who were 65 years of age or older. The median age was 38 years. For every 100 females there were 101.30 males. For every 100 females age 18 and over, there were 99.30 males.

The median income for a household in the county was $37,397, and the median income for a family was $45,036. Males had a median income of $35,425 versus $22,859 for females. The per capita income for the county was $18,582. About 8.20% of families and 10.60% of the population were below the poverty line, including 15.30% of those under age 18 and 7.70% of those age 65 or over.

== Government ==
=== County officials ===
- Commissioners: Cliff Mears, Darrell Banks, Tony Vero
- Prosecutor: Jodie Schumacher
- Sheriff: J. Steve Sheldon
- Auditor: Patrick W. Dropsey
- Treasurer: Bart Hamilton
- Recorder: Denise Jackson
- Clerk of Courts: Denise Ruhl
- Engineer: Adam Gove
- Judges of the Court of Common Pleas: Phillip Naumoff and Brent Robinson
- Judges of the Domestic Relations Court: Beth Owens
- Judges of the Juvenile Court: (William) Steven McKinley
- Judges of the Probate Court: Kelly Badnell

== Politics ==
Prior to 1944, Richland County was largely Democratic in presidential elections, only voting for Republican candidates four times from 1856 to 1940. But starting with the 1944 election, it has become a Republican stronghold for presidential elections, with Lyndon B. Johnson being the only Democrat to win since then. The rise of Donald Trump in 2016 saw the county swing even further in the GOP's favor, with Trump's vote share in the 2024 election the highest for any presidential candidate since 1928.

United States presidential election results for Richland County, Ohio
Year	Republican		Democratic		Third party(ies)	
Year	No.	%	No.	%	No.	%
1856	2,726	47.93%	2,909	51.14%	53	0.93%
1860	3,023	47.60%	3,135	49.36%	193	3.04%
1864	3,194	48.41%	3,404	51.59%	0	0.00%
1868	3,300	46.78%	3,754	53.22%	0	0.00%
1872	3,369	47.71%	3,672	52.00%	20	0.28%
1876	3,649	45.18%	4,407	54.56%	21	0.26%
1880	4,032	45.11%	4,885	54.65%	22	0.25%
1884	4,018	42.93%	5,191	55.47%	150	1.60%
1888	4,188	43.43%	5,198	53.90%	258	2.68%
1892	3,994	40.77%	5,398	55.10%	404	4.12%
1896	5,115	44.70%	6,256	54.67%	73	0.64%
1900	5,461	44.90%	6,581	54.11%	120	0.99%
1904	5,587	48.85%	5,407	47.27%	444	3.88%
1908	5,301	43.01%	6,702	54.37%	323	2.62%
1912	2,389	22.33%	5,201	48.62%	3,108	29.05%
1916	4,886	39.78%	6,985	56.87%	412	3.35%
1920	10,940	52.78%	9,349	45.11%	438	2.11%
1924	12,013	55.50%	6,703	30.97%	2,929	13.53%
1928	18,468	71.28%	7,295	28.16%	146	0.56%
1932	12,531	44.36%	15,225	53.90%	493	1.75%
1936	11,220	34.25%	20,070	61.27%	1,468	4.48%
1940	17,157	47.92%	18,645	52.08%	0	0.00%
1944	18,065	53.97%	15,406	46.03%	0	0.00%
1948	15,894	51.46%	14,712	47.63%	280	0.91%
1952	25,829	63.60%	14,780	36.40%	0	0.00%
1956	26,098	65.78%	13,578	34.22%	0	0.00%
1960	27,317	58.17%	19,645	41.83%	0	0.00%
1964	18,833	43.16%	24,799	56.84%	0	0.00%
1968	23,484	53.63%	14,988	34.23%	5,315	12.14%
1972	31,117	68.18%	13,468	29.51%	1,056	2.31%
1976	24,310	49.36%	23,065	46.83%	1,876	3.81%
1980	29,213	57.48%	18,253	35.91%	3,358	6.61%
1984	35,299	68.10%	16,141	31.14%	396	0.76%
1988	30,047	60.04%	19,617	39.20%	383	0.77%
1992	23,532	41.50%	19,606	34.58%	13,559	23.91%
1996	23,697	46.06%	20,832	40.49%	6,922	13.45%
2000	30,138	57.10%	20,572	38.98%	2,069	3.92%
2004	36,872	59.62%	24,638	39.84%	330	0.53%
2008	34,034	55.58%	25,727	42.01%	1,478	2.41%
2012	33,867	58.59%	22,687	39.25%	1,252	2.17%
2016	36,590	66.02%	16,085	29.02%	2,749	4.96%
2020	41,472	69.15%	17,640	29.41%	863	1.44%
2024	41,298	70.76%	16,591	28.43%	473	0.81%

United States Senate election results for Richland County, Ohio1
Year	Republican		Democratic		Third party(ies)	
Year	No.	%	No.	%	No.	%
2024	37,368	64.71%	18,488	32.02%	1,891	3.27%

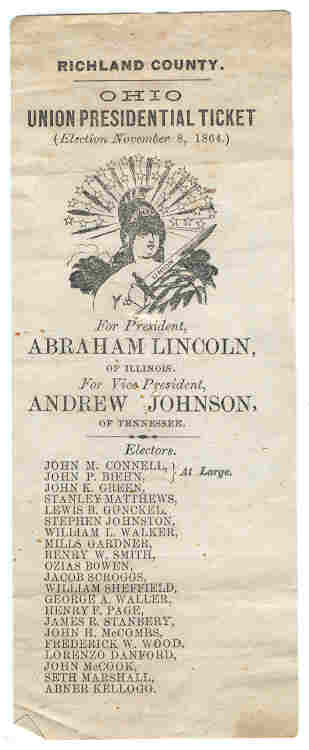
The Republican Party called itself the Union Party in 1864 and gave out this ballot for supporters to vote for Abraham Lincoln.

== Communities ==
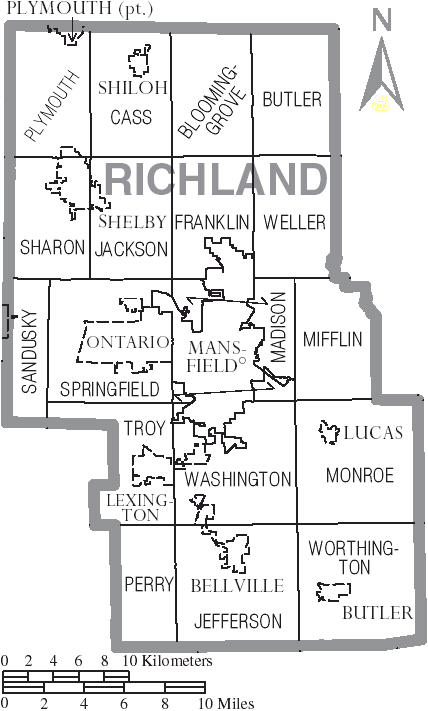
Map of Richland County, Ohio With Municipal and Township Labels

=== Cities ===
- Galion (part)
- Mansfield (county seat)
- Ontario
- Shelby

=== Villages ===
- Bellville
- Butler
- Crestline (part)
- Lexington
- Lucas
- Plymouth (part)
- Shiloh

=== Townships ===
- Bloominggrove
- Butler
- Cass
- Franklin
- Jackson
- Jefferson
- Madison
- Mifflin
- Monroe
- Perry
- Plymouth
- Sandusky
- Sharon
- Springfield
- Troy
- Washington
- Weller
- Worthington

=== Census-designated places ===
- Lincoln Heights
- Roseland

=== Unincorporated communities ===
- Adario
- Bangorville
- Ganges
- Olivesburg
- Shenandoah

=== Ghost towns ===
- Newville
- Winchester

== See also ==
- National Register of Historic Places listings in Richland County, Ohio
