= Butler Township, Richland County, Ohio =

Township in Ohio, US

- Township
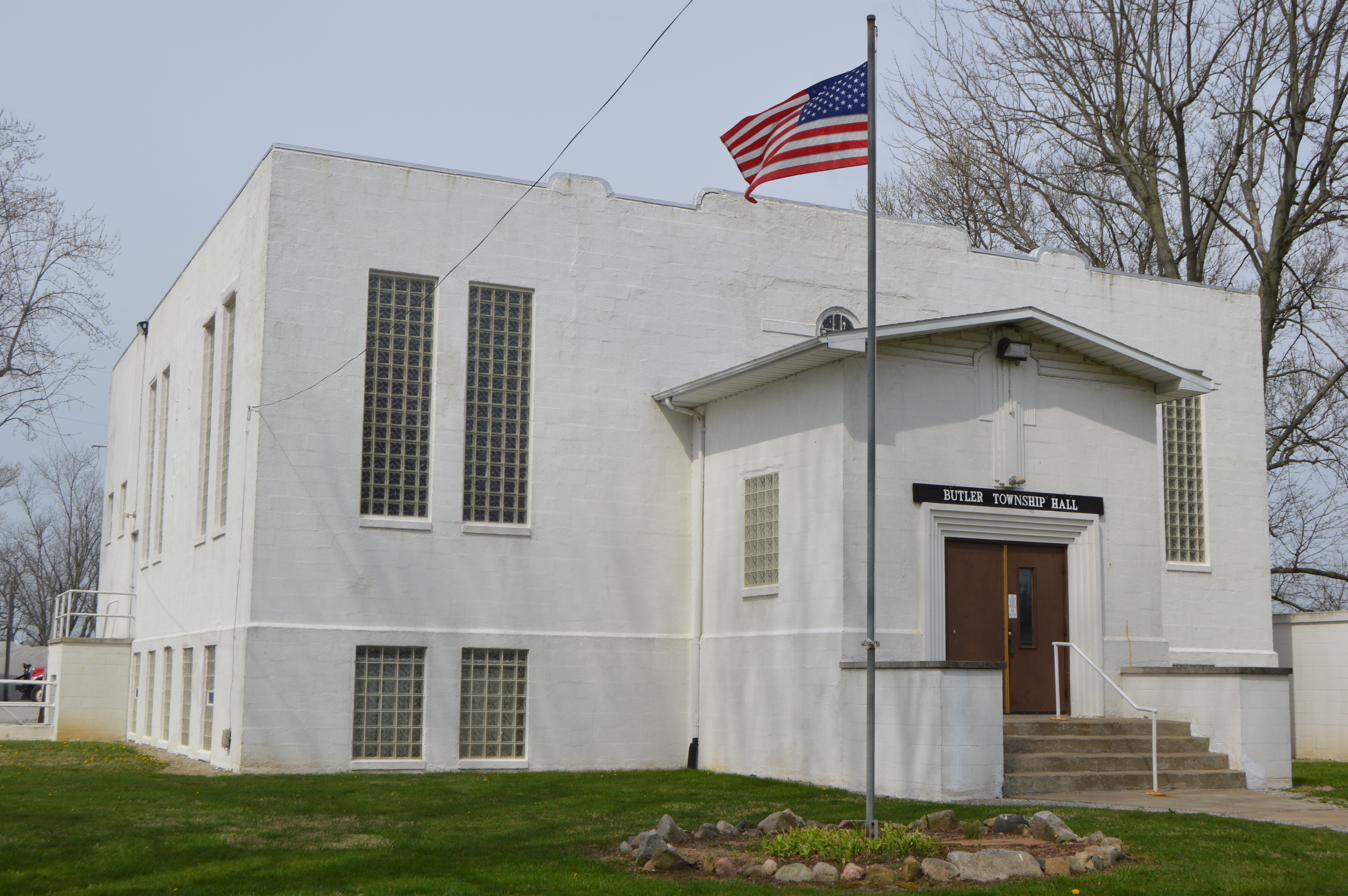
- Township hall at Adario

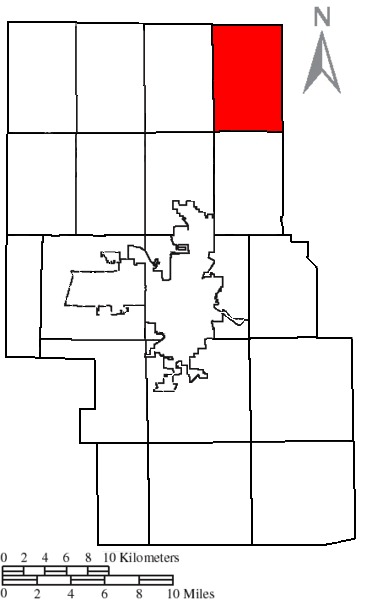
- Location of Butler Township in Richland County.
- Coordinates: 40°57′2″N 82°27′6″W
- Country: United States
- State: Ohio
- County: Richland
- Organized: 5 February 1849

Area
  - Total: 25.5 sq mi (66.1 km^{2})
  - Land: 25.5 sq mi (66.1 km^{2})
  - Water: 0 sq mi (0.0 km^{2})
- Elevation: 1,150 ft (350 m)

Population (2020)
  - Total: 1,167
  - Density: 45.7/sq mi (17.7/km^{2})
- Time zone: UTC-5 (Eastern (EST))
  - Summer (DST): UTC-4 (EDT)
- Area code: 419
- FIPS code: 39-10646
- GNIS feature ID: 1086873

Butler Township is one of the eighteen townships of Richland County, Ohio, United States. It is a part of the Mansfield Metropolitan Statistical Area. The 2020 census found 1,167 people in the township.

== Geography ==
Located in the northeastern corner of the county, it borders the following townships:

- Ruggles Township, Ashland County - northeast
- Clear Creek Township, Ashland County - east
- Milton Township, Ashland County - southeast corner
- Weller Township - south
- Franklin Township - southwest corner
- Blooming Grove Township - west
- Greenwich Township, Huron County - northwest

No municipalities are located in Butler Township.

== Name and history ==
It is one of six Butler Townships statewide. Upon the formation of Ashland County in 1846, the western two columns of sections of old Clear Creek Township which remained in Richland County were attached to make Blooming Grove Township six miles long by eight miles wide. Butler Township was created on 5 February 1849 by combining the Clear Creek addition and two columns of sections from the east part of Blooming Grove, assuming its present size of six miles long by four miles wide.

== Government ==
The township is governed by a three-member board of trustees, who are elected in November of odd-numbered years to a four-year term beginning on the following January 1. Two are elected in the year after the presidential election and one is elected in the year before it. There is also an elected township fiscal officer, who serves a four-year term beginning on April 1 of the year after the election, which is held in November of the year before the presidential election. Vacancies in the fiscal officership or on the board of trustees are filled by the remaining trustees.
