= Weller Township, Richland County, Ohio =

Township in Ohio, US

Weller Township
- Civil township
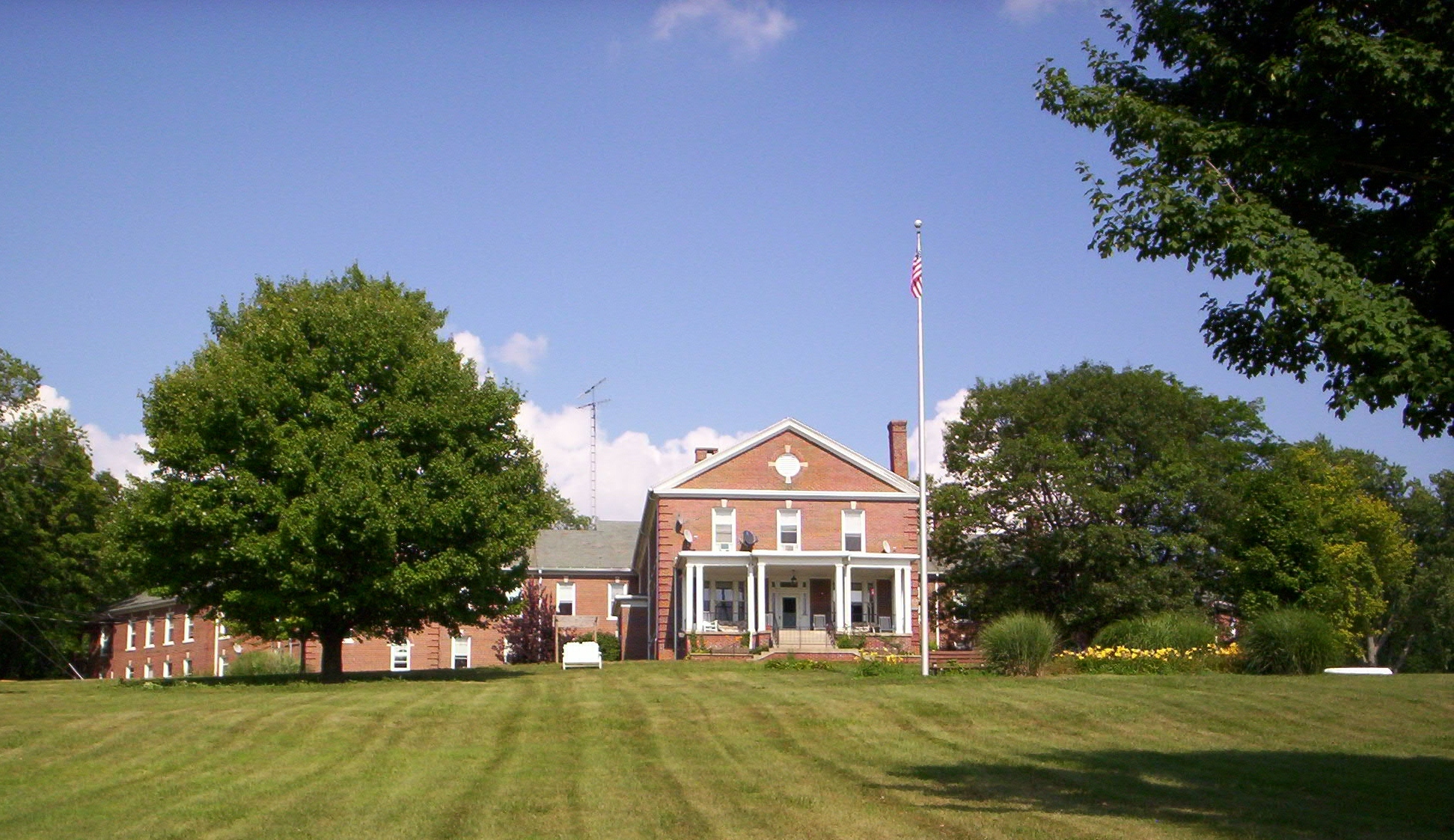
- Richland County Infirmary

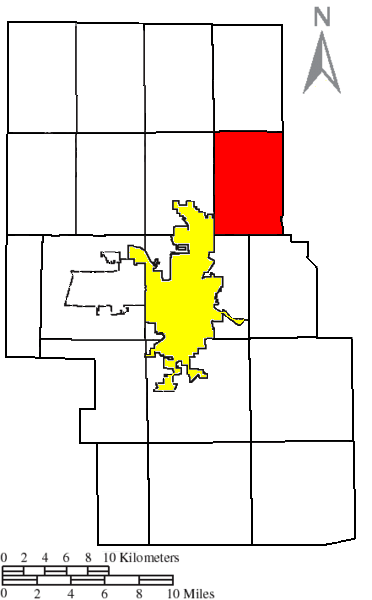
- Location of Weller Township (red) in Richland County, next to the city of Mansfield (yellow).
- Coordinates: 40°51′43″N 82°27′2″W
- Country: United States
- State: Ohio
- County: Richland

Area
  - Total: 24.7 sq mi (63.9 km^{2})
  - Land: 24.6 sq mi (63.8 km^{2})
  - Water: 0.039 sq mi (0.1 km^{2})
- Elevation: 1,037 ft (316 m)

Population (2020)
  - Total: 1,884
  - Density: 76/sq mi (29.5/km^{2})
- Time zone: UTC-5 (Eastern (EST))
  - Summer (DST): UTC-4 (EDT)
- FIPS code: 39-82628
- GNIS feature ID: 1086889
- Website: https://www.wellertownship.org/

Weller Township is one of the eighteen townships of Richland County, Ohio, United States. It is a part of the Mansfield Metropolitan Statistical Area. The 2020 census found 1,884 people in the township.

== Geography ==
Located in the northeastern part of the county, it borders the following townships:

- Butler Township - north
- Clear Creek Township, Ashland County - northeast corner
- Milton Township, Ashland County - east
- Mifflin Township - southeast
- Madison Township - southwest
- Franklin Township - west
- Blooming Grove Township - northwest corner

No municipalities are located in Weller Township, although the unincorporated community of Olivesburg lies in the northeastern part of the township.

== Name and history ==
It is the only Weller Township statewide. After the formation of Ashland County in 1846, a few years later Weller Township was formed. The eastern half of Weller County was formed from the western two columns of sections of Milton Township which remained in Richland County. The western half of Weller Township was also composed of two columns of sections, gained from old Franklin Township, which combined to give Weller Township its present dimensions—four by six miles.

== Government ==
The township is governed by a three-member board of trustees, who are elected in November of odd-numbered years to a four-year term beginning on the following January 1. Two are elected in the year after the presidential election and one is elected in the year before it. There is also an elected township fiscal officer, who serves a four-year term beginning on April 1 of the year after the election, which is held in November of the year before the presidential election. Vacancies in the fiscal officership or on the board of trustees are filled by the remaining trustees.
