= Ward House =

Ward House may refer to:

== In the United States ==
(by state, then city/town)

- Dr. H. B. Ward House, Cuba, Alabama
- Alma Ward Meeting House, Mesa, Arizona, listed on the NRHP in Maricopa County, Arizona
- Ward-Stout House, Bradford, Arkansas
- Earl and Mildred Ward House, Conway, Arkansas
- Mitchell-Ward House (Gentry, Arkansas)
- Ward-Jackson House, Hope, Arkansas
- Ward-Hays House, Little Rock, Arkansas
- Ward House (Los Angeles, California), a property that is on the List of Los Angeles Historic-Cultural Monuments in the San Fernando Valley
- William Ward Jr. House, Middlefield, Connecticut
- Welles-Shipman-Ward House, South Glastonbury, Connecticut
- Ward-Heitman House, West Haven, Connecticut
- Thornton Ward Estate, Toledo, Illinois
- J. C. B. Warde House, Muscatine, Iowa
- Ward-Meade House, Topeka, Kansas
- Ward Brothers' House and Shop, Crisfield, Maryland
- Richard Ward House, Andover, Massachusetts
- John Ward House, in Haverhill, Massachusetts, a historic house included in the Buttonwoods Museum of the Haverhill Historical Society
- Ephraim Ward House, Newton, Massachusetts
- John Ward House (Newton, Massachusetts), a historic Federal-style house in Newton, Massachusetts
- John Ward House (Salem, Massachusetts), a National Historic Landmark house
- Joshua Ward House, Salem, Massachusetts
- Gen. Artemas Ward Homestead, Shrewsbury, Massachusetts
- Ward-Holland House, Marine City, Michigan
- Noah P. Ward House, Alexandria, Minnesota, listed on the NRHP in Douglas County, Minnesota
- Roscoe P. Ward House, Waseca, Minnesota
- Ward House (Enterprise, Mississippi)
- Junius R. Ward House, Erwin, Mississippi
- Seth E. Ward Homestead, Kansas City, Missouri
- Ward Hotel, Thompson Falls, Montana
- Whidden-Ward House, Portsmouth, New Hampshire
- Ambrose-Ward Mansion, East Orange, New Jersey
- Ward-Force House and Condit Family Cook House, Livingston, New Jersey
- Moore-Ward Cobblestone House, Artesia, New Mexico
- C. W. G. Ward House, Las Vegas, New Mexico, listed on the NRHP in San Miguel County, New Mexico
- Ward House (Childs, New York), included in Cobblestone Historic District
- Breckwoldt-Ward House, Dolgeville, New York
- Caleb T. Ward Mansion, on Staten Island in New York, New York
- William E. Ward House, Rye, New York, (and also in Greenwich, Connecticut)
- Ward House (Syracuse, New York)
- Ward House (Tuckahoe, New York)
- Ward House (Westfield, New York)
- King-Casper-Ward-Bazemore House, Ahoskie, North Carolina
- Ward-Hancock House, Beaufort, North Carolina
- Mitchell-Ward House (Belvidere, North Carolina)
- Dr. E. H. Ward Farm, Bynum, North Carolina
- Ward-Applewhite-Thompson House, Stantonsburg, North Carolina
- Ward Family House, Sugar Grove, North Carolina
- Ward House (Hudson, Ohio), listed on the National Register of Historic Places in Summit County, Ohio
- W. S. Ward House, Mansfield, Ohio, listed on the NRHP in Richland County, Ohio
- Ward-Thomas House, Niles, Ohio, listed on the NRHP in Trumbull County, Ohio
- John Q. A. Ward House, Urbana, Ohio
- Elbert and Harriet Ward Ranch, Custer, South Dakota
- Ward House (Houston, Texas), listed on the National Register of Historic Places in Harris County, Texas
- Patrick L. and Rose O. Ward House, Springville, Utah
- Milo P. Ward House, Port Townsend, Washington, listed on the NRHP in Jefferson County, Washington
- Ward House (Seattle, Washington)
- See-Ward House, Mill Creek, West Virginia
- Ward Memorial Hall, Wood, Wisconsin

== See also ==
- Ward Hall (disambiguation)
- Mitchell-Ward House (disambiguation)
- John Ward House (disambiguation)
- Monroe Ward, a neighborhood of Richmond, Virginia, that is
