= Mitchell House =

Mitchell House may refer to:

== Australia ==
- Mitchell House (Melbourne, Victoria)

== United States ==
by state then city

- Drewry-Mitchell-Moorer House, Eufaula, Alabama, NRHP-listed in Barbour County
- Bragg-Mitchell House, Mobile, Alabama, NRHP-listed in Mobile County
- Mitchell House (Batesville, Arkansas), listed on the National Register of Historic Places (NRHP) in Independence County
- Mitchell House (Gentry, Arkansas), listed on the NRHP in Benton County
- Mitchell–Ward House (Gentry, Arkansas), NRHP-listed in Benton County
- Mitchell House (Little Rock, Arkansas), listed on the NRHP in Pulaski County
- Beisel-Mitchell House, Paragould, Arkansas, NRHP-listed
- Mitchell House (Waltreak, Arkansas), listed on the NRHP in Yell County
- Guerry-Mitchell House, Americus, Georgia, NRHP-listed in Sumter County
- Burch-Mitchell House, Thomasville, Georgia, NRHP-listed in Thomas County
- Joseph Mitchell House, Smithville, Indiana, NRHP-listed
- Lanphear-Mitchell House, Atchison, Kansas, NRHP-listed in Atchison County
- Glen Mitchell House, Dodge City, Kansas, also known as Mitchell House
- James P. Mitchell House and Farmstead, Mitchellsburg, Kentucky, NRHP-listed in Boyle County
- Mitchell-Estes Farmstead, Smiths Grove, Kentucky, NRHP-listed in Warren and Edmonson counties
- Mitchell House (Yarmouth, Maine), listed on the NRHP in Maine
- Mitchell House (Elkton, Maryland), listed on the NRHP in Cecil County
- Mitchell House (Fair Hill, Maryland), listed on the NRHP in Cecil County
- Amy B. Mitchell House, Winchester, Massachusetts, NRHP-listed
- Charles T. Mitchell House, Cadillac, Michigan, NRHP-listed
- Mitchell–Tappan House, Hibbing, Minnesota, NRHP-listed in St. Louis County
- Davis-Mitchell House, Vicksburg, Mississippi, NRHP-listed in Warren County
- William Mitchell House, Ahoskie, North Carolina, NRHP-listed
- Mitchell House (Thomasville, North Carolina), listed on the NRHP in Davidson County
- Charles Mitchell House, Washington Township, Ohio, NRHP-listed in Franklin County
- Randolph Mitchell House, New Reading, Ohio, NRHP-listed
- Richard H. Mitchell House, Cincinnati, Ohio, NRHP-listed
- Mitchell Hall (Eastern Oklahoma State College), Wilburton, Oklahoma, NRHP-listed in Latimer County
- Hargis-Mitchell-Cochran House, Wynnewood, Oklahoma, NRHP-listed in Garvin County
- Mitchell-Shook House, Greencastle, Pennsylvania, NRHP-listed
- James Mitchell House, Indiana, Pennsylvania, NRHP-listed
- Mitchell–Arnold House, Pawtucket, Rhode Island, NRHP-listed
- Mitchell–Ward House (Belvidere, North Carolina), NRHP-listed
- Crowell Mitchell House, Leesville, South Carolina, NRHP-listed
- Gen. William Mitchell House, Middleburg, Virginia, NRHP-listed
- Mitchell-Shealy House, Leesville, South Carolina, NRHP-listed
- McKendree Mitchell House, Batesburg, South Carolina, NRHP-listed
- Mitchell House (Lebanon, Tennessee), listed on the NRHP in Wilson County
- Guy Mitchell House, Victoria, Texas, NRHP-listed in Victoria County
- Byron T. Mitchell House, Francis, Utah, NRHP-listed in Summit County
- Alexander Mitchell House (Salt Lake City, Utah), NRHP-listed
- King–Lancaster–McCoy–Mitchell House, Bristol, Virginia, NRHP-listed
- Mitchell-Rountree House, Platteville, Wisconsin, NRHP-listed in Grant County

== See also ==
- Mitchell Hall (disambiguation)
- Mitchell-Ward House (disambiguation)
