= National Register of Historic Places listings in Richland County, Ohio =

Location of Richland County in Ohio

This is intended to be a complete list of the properties and districts on the National Register of Historic Places in Richland County, Ohio, United States. The locations of National Register properties and districts for which the latitude and longitude coordinates are included below, may be seen in an online map.

There are 70 properties and districts listed on the National Register in the county. Another 2 properties were once listed but have been removed.

This National Park Service list is complete through NPS recent listings posted May 1, 2026.

== Current listings ==
	Name on the Register	Image	Date listed	Location	City or town	Description
1	All Souls Unitarian-Universalist Church	All Souls Unitarian-Universalist Church	January 1, 1976 (#76001520)	125 Church St. 40°37′11″N 82°30′45″W	Bellville	1894, Richardsonian Romanesque, still in use
2	Jacob H. Barr House	Jacob H. Barr House	July 8, 1983 (#83002023)	646 Park Ave., W. 40°45′34″N 82°32′20″W	Mansfield	
3	Bellville Bandstand	Bellville Bandstand	November 26, 1973 (#73001519)	North Bellville Municipal Park; 40°37′13″N 82°30′42″W	Bellville	
4	Bellville Cemetery Chapel	Bellville Cemetery Chapel	July 8, 2010 (#10000457)	Bellville Cemetery, State Route 97; 40°37′16″N 82°31′08″W	Bellville	
5	Bellville Village Hall	Bellville Village Hall	March 17, 1976 (#76001521)	Park Pl. and Church St. 40°37′11″N 82°30′43″W	Bellville	
6	Bissman Block	Bissman Block	October 16, 1986 (#86002882)	193 N. Main St. 40°45′49″N 82°30′56″W	Mansfield	
7	B. F. Bissman House	B. F. Bissman House	July 8, 1983 (#83002024)	458 Park Ave., W. 40°45′32″N 82°31′59″W	Mansfield	
8	Peter Bissman House	Peter Bissman House	July 8, 1983 (#83002025)	462 Park Ave., W. 40°45′32″N 82°32′00″W	Mansfield	
9	Rigby House at 240 Park Avenue West	Rigby House at 240 Park Avenue West	July 8, 1983 (#83002026)	240 Park Ave., W. 40°45′33″N 82°31′28″W	Mansfield	Designed by Vernon Redding
10	Building at 252–254 Park Avenue West	Building at 252–254 Park Avenue West	February 2, 1984 (#84003802)	252–254 Park Ave., W. 40°45′33″N 82°31′29″W	Mansfield	
11	Building at 309 Park Avenue West	Building at 309 Park Avenue West	February 2, 1984 (#84003801)	309 Park Ave., W. 40°45′32″N 82°31′37″W	Mansfield	
12	Building at 415 Park Avenue West	Building at 415 Park Avenue West	February 2, 1984 (#84003799)	415 Park Ave., W. 40°45′32″N 82°31′51″W	Mansfield	
13	Martin Bushnell House	Martin Bushnell House	April 26, 1974 (#74001609)	34 Sturges Ave. 40°45′10″N 82°31′24″W	Mansfield	
14	Central United Methodist Church	Central United Methodist Church	July 8, 1983 (#83002027)	378 Park Ave., W. 40°45′33″N 82°31′46″W	Mansfield	
15	City Mills Building	City Mills Building	December 18, 1986 (#86003500)	160 N. Main St. 40°45′46″N 82°30′54″W	Mansfield	
16	The Colonial	The Colonial	July 8, 1983 (#83002028)	283 Park Ave., W. 40°45′31″N 82°31′33″W	Mansfield	
17	J. M. Cook House	J. M. Cook House	July 8, 1983 (#83002029)	429 Park Ave., W. 40°45′31″N 82°31′54″W	Mansfield	
18	Moses and Margaret Dickey House		February 17, 2022 (#100007421)	159 North Walnut St. 40°45′46″N 82°30′59″W	Mansfield	
19	S. M. Douglas House	S. M. Douglas House	July 8, 1983 (#83002030)	437 Park Ave., W. 40°45′31″N 82°31′54″W	Mansfield	
20	Dow House	Dow House	July 8, 1983 (#83002031)	564 Park Ave., W. 40°45′32″N 82°32′11″W	Mansfield	
21	Downtown Mansfield Historic District	Downtown Mansfield Historic District	July 25, 2019 (#100004214)	Roughly bounded by 5th, Diamond, 2nd, and Mulberry Sts. 40°45′30″N 82°30′56″W	Mansfield	
22	Silas Ferrell House	Silas Ferrell House	December 14, 1987 (#87002146)	25 E. Main St. 40°58′01″N 82°35′57″W	Shiloh	
23	First Congregational Church and Lexington School	First Congregational Church and Lexington School	February 23, 1979 (#79001929)	47 Delaware St. and 51 W. Church St. 40°40′39″N 82°35′09″W	Lexington	
24	First English Lutheran Church	First English Lutheran Church	July 8, 1983 (#83002032)	53 Park Ave., W. 40°45′30″N 82°31′04″W	Mansfield	
25	Fraser House	Fraser House	July 8, 1983 (#83002033)	681 Park Ave., W. 40°45′32″N 82°32′28″W	Mansfield	Designed by F. B. Hursh
26	F. A. Gilbert House	F. A. Gilbert House	February 2, 1984 (#84003800)	343 Park Ave., W. 40°45′31″N 82°31′41″W	Mansfield	
27	Gurney-Kochheiser House	Gurney-Kochheiser House	April 30, 1976 (#76001522)	174 Main St. 40°37′09″N 82°30′42″W	Bellville	
28	Hancock and Dow Building	Hancock and Dow Building	February 26, 1987 (#86002864)	21 E. 4th St. 40°45′40″N 82°30′54″W	Mansfield	
29	Rufus A. Kern House	Rufus A. Kern House	July 8, 1983 (#83002034)	608 Park Ave., W. 40°45′33″N 82°32′15″W	Mansfield	
30	Kingwood Center	Kingwood Center	November 7, 1976 (#76001523)	900 Park Ave., W. 40°45′36″N 82°32′52″W	Mansfield	
31	John Krause House	John Krause House	July 8, 1983 (#83002035)	428 Park Ave., W. 40°45′33″N 82°31′53″W	Mansfield	
32	Samuel Lewis House	Samuel Lewis House	June 1, 1982 (#82003636)	291 N. Stewart Rd., east of Mansfield; 40°45′58″N 82°28′35″W	Madison Township	
33	Malabar Farm	Malabar Farm	April 11, 1973 (#73001520)	Southeast of Lucas on Pleasant Valley Rd. 40°38′57″N 82°23′26″W	Monroe Township	
34	Mansfield Savings Bank	Mansfield Savings Bank	October 16, 1986 (#86002872)	4 W. 4th St. 40°45′40″N 82°30′57″W	Mansfield	
35	Mansfield Woman's Club	Mansfield Woman's Club	July 8, 1983 (#83002037)	145 Park Ave., W. 40°45′31″N 82°31′16″W	Mansfield	
36	Judge Mansfield House	Judge Mansfield House	July 8, 1983 (#83002036)	228 Park Ave., W. 40°45′15″N 82°31′03″W	Mansfield	No longer extant per Google Street View.
37	Marvin Memorial Library	Marvin Memorial Library	August 13, 1987 (#86003493)	34 N. Gamble St. 40°52′59″N 82°39′44″W	Shelby	
38	May Realty Building	May Realty Building	October 16, 1986 (#86002865)	22–32 S. Park St. 40°45′28″N 82°30′53″W	Mansfield	
39	Mechanics Building and Loan Company	Mechanics Building and Loan Company	July 8, 1983 (#83002038)	2 S. Main St. 40°45′30″N 82°30′57″W	Mansfield	
40	Most Pure Heart Of Mary Church	Most Pure Heart Of Mary Church	November 30, 1978 (#78002179)	West St. and Raymond Ave. 40°52′58″N 82°40′02″W	Shelby	
41	Oak Hill Cottage	Oak Hill Cottage	June 11, 1969 (#69000149)	310 Springmill St. 40°46′04″N 82°31′04″W	Mansfield	
42	Ohio Brass Company Office Building		February 3, 2025 (#100011412)	380 N Main Street; 40°46′07″N 82°30′50″W		
43	Ohio State Reformatory	Ohio State Reformatory	April 14, 1983 (#83002039)	Olivesburg Rd. 40°47′07″N 82°30′18″W	Mansfield	
44	Ohio Theatre	Ohio Theatre	May 31, 1983 (#83002040)	136 Park Ave., W. 40°45′32″N 82°31′16″W	Mansfield	
45	Old Carriage Barn	Old Carriage Barn	July 8, 1983 (#83002041)	337 Park Ave., W. 40°45′31″N 82°31′41″W	Mansfield	
46	Pacific Curios Antiques	Pacific Curios Antiques	July 8, 1983 (#83002042)	365 Park Ave., W. 40°45′31″N 82°31′44″W	Mansfield	No longer extant per Google Street View.
47	Park Avenue Baptist Church	Park Avenue Baptist Church	July 8, 1983 (#83002043)	296 Park Ave., W. 40°45′34″N 82°31′34″W	Mansfield	
48	Plymouth Greenlawn Cemetery Chapel	Plymouth Greenlawn Cemetery Chapel	February 22, 1996 (#96000116)	Greenlawn Cemetery; 40°59′13″N 82°40′07″W	Plymouth	
49	Plymouth Historic District	Plymouth Historic District	December 7, 2018 (#100003245)	Roughly bounded by Dix, Trux, Mills, and New Railroad Sts. 40°59′43″N 82°40′02″W	Plymouth	Extends into Huron County
50	Raemelton Farm Historic District	Raemelton Farm Historic District	January 8, 2003 (#02001682)	Bounded by Marion Ave. and Millsboro and Trimble Rds. 40°44′36″N 82°32′53″W	Mansfield	
51	Richland County Infirmary	Richland County Infirmary	September 24, 2001 (#01001042)	3220 Mansfield-Olivesburg Rd., north of Mansfield; 40°50′25″N 82°28′12″W	Weller Township	Designed by Friedrich Ferdinand Schnitzer
52	Richland Trust Building	Richland Trust Building	July 8, 1983 (#83002044)	3 Park Ave., W. 40°45′31″N 82°30′57″W	Mansfield	
53	William Ritter House	William Ritter House	December 29, 1978 (#78002178)	181 S. Main St. 40°45′12″N 82°30′57″W	Mansfield	
54	Rummell Mill	Rummell Mill	April 7, 1982 (#82003635)	Northeast of Butler on State Route 349; 40°35′59″N 82°24′29″W	Worthington Township	
55	Sacred Heart of Jesus Churches	Sacred Heart of Jesus Churches	January 6, 1986 (#86000035)	State Route 61 at Bethlehem; 40°50′16″N 82°43′21″W	Sharon Township	
56	St. Peter's Church	St. Peter's Church	November 29, 1979 (#79001930)	54 S. Mulberry St. 40°45′25″N 82°31′07″W	Mansfield	
57	Robert Sandiford House	Robert Sandiford House	July 8, 1983 (#83002045)	544 Park Ave., W. 40°45′33″N 82°32′07″W	Mansfield	
58	George Shambaugh House	George Shambaugh House	April 1, 1982 (#82003637)	Frontz Rd., northwest of Perrysville; 40°43′10″N 82°20′48″W	Monroe Township	
59	Shelby Center Historic District	Shelby Center Historic District	May 13, 1982 (#82003638)	E. and W. Main Sts. 40°52′51″N 82°39′38″W	Shelby	
60	Shelby Oakland Mausoleum		October 11, 2024 (#100010896)	116 S. Gamble St. 40°52′18″N 82°39′55″W	Shelby	
61	John Sherman Memorial Gateway	John Sherman Memorial Gateway	July 8, 1983 (#83002046)	699 Park Ave., W. 40°45′32″N 82°32′26″W	Mansfield	
62	Soldiers and Sailors Memorial Building and Madison Theater	Soldiers and Sailors Memorial Building and Madison Theater	May 27, 1980 (#80003214)	36 Park Ave., W. 40°45′32″N 82°31′01″W	Mansfield	
63	Springfield Township School	Springfield Township School	April 24, 2003 (#03000325)	3560 Park Ave., W. 40°45′40″N 82°38′33″W	Ontario	
64	Stewart Towers	Stewart Towers	July 8, 1983 (#83002048)	13 Park Ave., W. 40°45′30″N 82°30′59″W	Mansfield	
65	Susan Sturges House	Susan Sturges House	July 8, 1983 (#83002049)	317 Park Ave., W. 40°45′31″N 82°31′35″W	Mansfield	
66	Tappan House	Tappan House	July 8, 1983 (#83002050)	308 Park Ave., W. 40°45′33″N 82°31′36″W	Mansfield	
67	Tubbs-Sourwine House	Tubbs-Sourwine House	February 5, 1999 (#99000094)	49 Railroad St. 40°59′38″N 82°40′04″W	Plymouth	
68	Upson House	Upson House	July 8, 1983 (#83002051)	234 Park Ave., W. 40°45′14″N 82°31′03″W	Mansfield	
69	Voegele Building	Voegele Building	January 14, 2000 (#99001687)	211 N. Main St. 40°45′51″N 82°30′56″W	Mansfield	
70	W. S. Ward House	W. S. Ward House	July 8, 1983 (#83002052)	350 Park Ave., W. 40°45′32″N 82°31′43″W	Mansfield	

== Former listings ==
	Name on the Register	Image	Date listed	Date removed	Location	City or town	Description
1	Renner and Weber Brewery		September 16, 1977 (#77001084)	February 20, 1980	79 E. 4th St.	Mansfield	Destroyed by fire on June 14, 1978.
2	Wilfred J. Spreng House		July 8, 1983 (#83002047)	October 29, 1985	414 Park Ave., W.	Mansfield	

== See also ==
- List of National Historic Landmarks in Ohio
- Listings in neighboring counties: Ashland, Crawford, Huron, Knox, Morrow
- National Register of Historic Places listings in Ohio
