= John Ward House =

John Ward House may refer to:

- John Ward House (Newton, Massachusetts), a historic Federal style house
- John Ward House (Salem, Massachusetts), a National Historic Landmark house, listed on the NRHP
- John Ward House, Haverhill, Massachusetts, a historic house included in the Buttonwoods Museum of the Haverhill Historical Society
- John Q.A. Ward House, Urbana, Ohio, listed on the National Register of Historic Places listings in Champaign County, Ohio

== See also ==
- Ward House (disambiguation)
