= Central Methodist Church =

Central Methodist Church may refer to:

in England

- Central Methodist Church, Eastbourne, the main Methodist place of worship in Eastbourne, East Sussex
- Central Methodist Church, Lincoln, Lincolnshire
- Central Methodist Church, Nantwich, a former Wesleyan Methodist church on Hospital Street, Nantwich, Cheshire, England
- Central Methodist Church, York, the main Methodist place of worship in York

in the United States

- Hanson Place Central Methodist Church, a Methodist church in Brooklyn, New York, located on the northwest corner of Hanson Place and Saint Felix Street
- Central Methodist Church (Spartanburg, South Carolina), listed on the U.S. National Register of Historic Places

== See also ==
- Central Methodist Episcopal Church (disambiguation)
- Central Mine Methodist Church
- Central United Methodist Church (disambiguation)
