= Mitchell–Ward House =

Mitchell-Ward House may refer to:

- Mitchell–Ward House (Gentry, Arkansas), listed on the National Register of Historic Places in Benton County
- Mitchell–Ward House (Belvidere, North Carolina), listed on the National Register of Historic Places in Perquimans County

== See also ==
- Mitchell House (disambiguation)
- Ward House (disambiguation)
