= Barr House =

Barr House may refer to:

- Amelia Barr House
- Charles Barr House
- D. D. D. Barr House
- Jacob H. Barr House
