= Ward Hill =

A number of places are known as Ward Hill:

- Ward Hill, Hoy, a 481 m hill on Hoy, Orkney, Scotland
- Ward Hill, a neighborhood of Haverhill, Massachusetts, United States
- Ward Hill, South Australia, a locality on the Yorke Peninsula in South Australia, Australia
- Ward Hill, Staten Island, a neighborhood on Staten Island, New York, United States

== See also ==
- Hill of Ward, in County Meath, Ireland
- Ward Hall (disambiguation)
