= William and Ann Bringhurst House =

Historic house in Utah, United States

- U.S. National Register of Historic Places
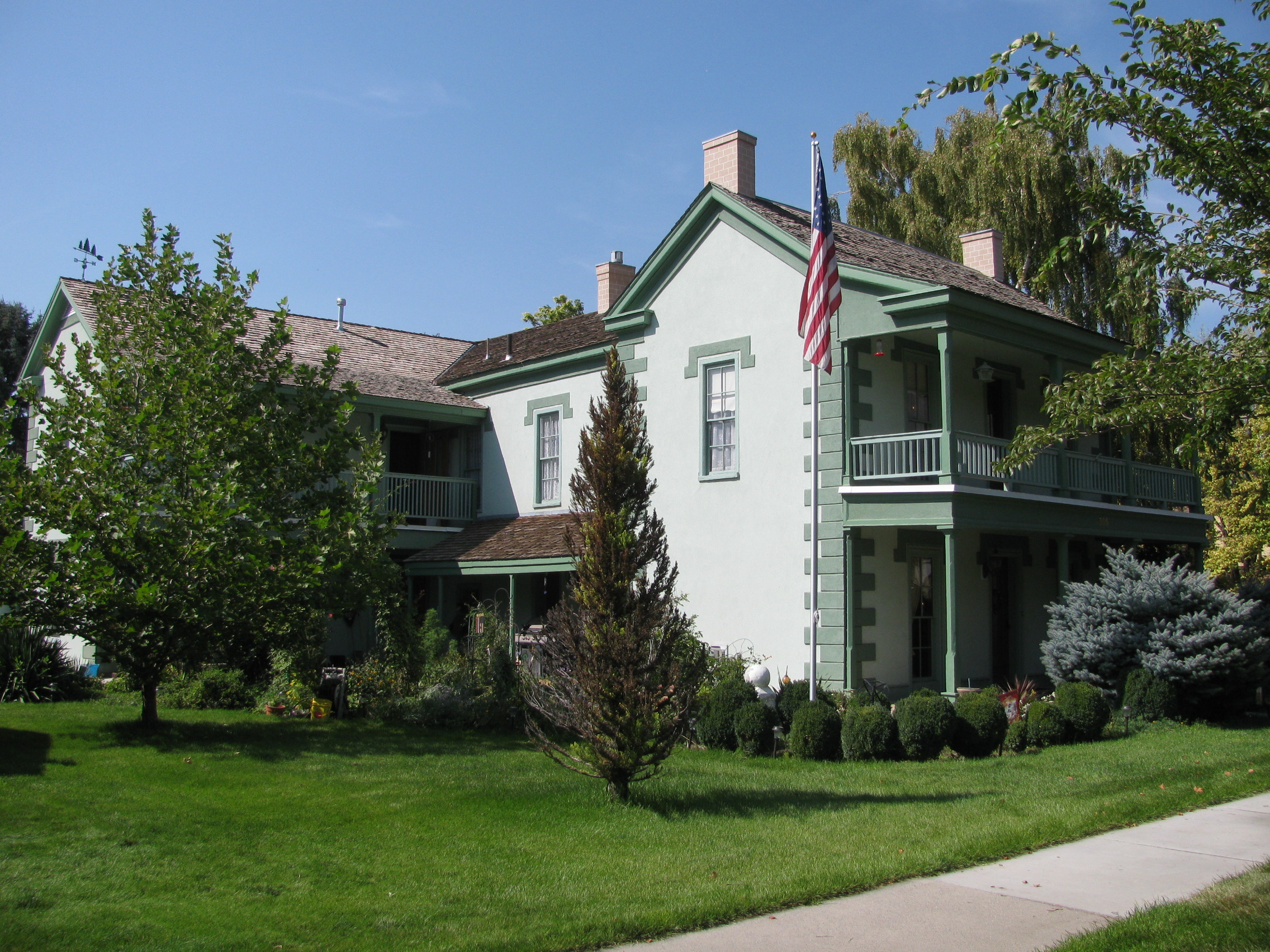
- The William and Ann Bringhurst House, September 2012

- Location within Utah Location within the United States
- Location: 306 South 200 West; Springville, Utah; United States
- Coordinates: 40°9′45″N 111°36′49″W
- Area: 0.4 acres (0.16 ha)
- Built: 1856; c.1895; 1955
- Architect: Solomon D. Chase
- Architectural style: Greek Revival, Mid 19th Century Revival
- MPS: Springville MPS
- NRHP reference No.: 97001567
- Added to NRHP: January 5, 1998

The William and Ann Bringhurst House, is a historic residence within the Springville Historic District in Springville, Utah, United States, that is listed on the National Register of Historic Places (NRHP).

== Description ==
The house is located at 306 South 200 West and was built in 1856. It includes Greek Revival and Mid 19th Century Revival architecture. It was built of adobe in 1856, and was extended c.1895 and again in 1955.

Some design work was by Solomon D. Chase.

It was listed on the NRHP in 1998 and is an individually listed contributing property to the Springville Historic District.

== See also ==
- National Register of Historic Places listings in Utah County, Utah
- James P. and Lydia Strang House, also NRHP-listed, nearby, and mistakenly reported as having address that is in fact the address of the Bringhurst House
