= Springville Community Presbyterian Church =

Historic church in Utah, United States

- Springville Presbyterian Church
- U.S. National Register of Historic Places
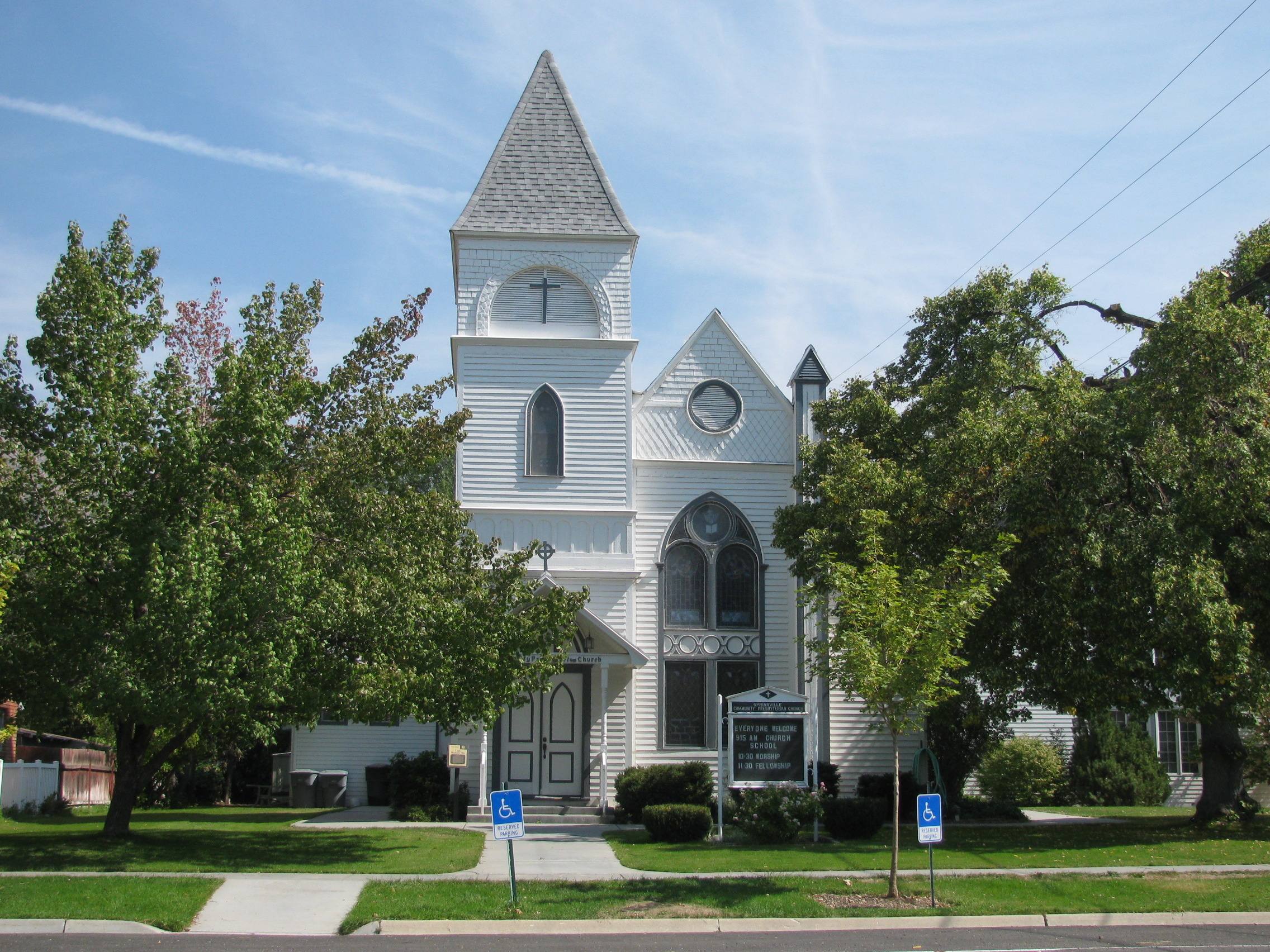
- Front view of the church, September 2012

- Location within Utah Location within the United States
- Location: 245 South 200 East; Springville, Utah; United States
- Coordinates: 40°9′47″N 111°36′21″W
- Area: less than one acre
- Built: 1877
- Architectural style: Late Gothic Revival, Modified Late Gothic Revival
- NRHP reference No.: 80003983
- Added to NRHP: October 24, 1980

The Springville Community Presbyterian Church has been an active congregation since the late 1800s. It meets in an historic church building in Springville, Utah, United States, that is listed on the National Register of Historic Places (NRHP) as Springville Presbyterian Church.

== Description ==
The church is located at 245 South 200 East, within the Springville Historic District and is an individually listed contributing property. It was built in 1892 and includes Late Gothic Revival, Modified Late Gothic Revival, and other architecture. It has almost all original stained glass windows and is known for its great acoustics.

The church is currently called the Springville Community Presbyterian Church (2021), part of the PC (USA). The church, and a house right down the street, was featured on the television series Touched by an Angel. As a community church it houses a number of rental groups and is available for short-term rentals (weddings, music recording, reunions, funerals, meetings).

The church was listed on the NRHP in 1980. According to its NRHP nomination, it is significant as the first Protestant church in Springville, for its sponsorship of the Hungerford Academy school, and for representing "the system of over a dozen churches: and more than thirty schools maintained by the Presbyterians at the peak of their activity in Utah."

== See also ==
- National Register of Historic Places listings in Utah County, Utah
