= Central United Methodist Church =

Central United Methodist Church may refer to:

in the Philippines

- Central United Methodist Church (Manila)

in the United States

- Central United Methodist Church (Detroit), listed on the NRHP in Michigan
- Central United Methodist Church (Mansfield, Ohio), listed on the NRHP in Ohio
- Central Methodist Church (Spartanburg, South Carolina)
- Central United Methodist Church (Knoxville, Tennessee), listed on the NRHP in Tennessee
