= Deal–Mendenhall Hall =

Historic house in Utah, United States

- U.S. National Register of Historic Places
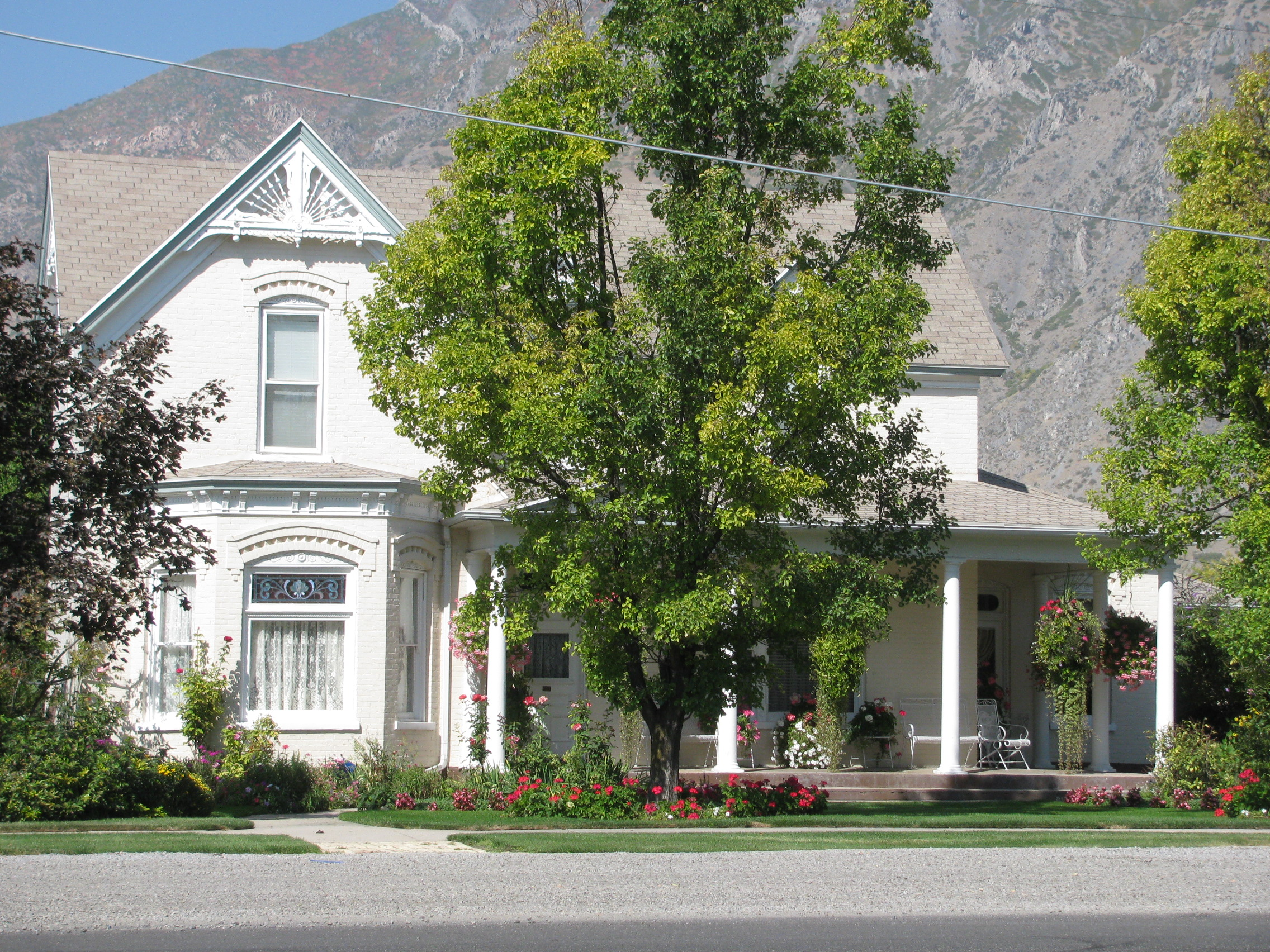
- Deal–Mendenhall Hall, September 2012

- Location within Utah Location within the United States
- Location: 163 East 200 North; Springville, Utah; United States
- Coordinates: 40°10′12.26″N 111°36′24.1″W
- Area: 0.5 acres (0.20 ha)
- Built: 1896; 130 years ago
- Built by: T.E. Child, Ward & Sons (millwork), Will Friel (brickwork)
- Architect: T.E. Child (possibly)
- Architectural style: Late Victorian
- MPS: Springville MPS
- NRHP reference No.: 97001569
- Added to NRHP: January 5, 1998

Deal–Mendenhall Hall is a historic residence within the Springville Historic District in Springville, Utah, United States, that is listed on the National Register of Historic Places (NRHP).

== Description ==
The house is located at 163 East 200 North and was built in 1896 It was part of the Springville Multiple Property Submission which added eleven Springville properties to National Register of Historic Places.

It was a home of the family of Romanzo A. Deal, a businessman and civic leader of Springville, and it was later a home of the family of Guy Mendenhall.

It was listed on the NRHP on January 5, 1998.

== See also ==
- National Register of Historic Places listings in Utah County, Utah
