= Mitchell Hall =

Mitchell Hall may refer to:

- Mitchell K. Hall, professor of history
- Mitchell Hall (Eastern Oklahoma State College), Wilburton, Oklahoma, listed on the National Register of Historic Places (NRHP) in Latimer County
- Mitchell Hall, at The George Washington University, Washington, D.C.

== See also ==
- Mitchell House (disambiguation)
- Lady Mitchell Hall
