= Richland Trust Building =

- U.S. National Register of Historic Places
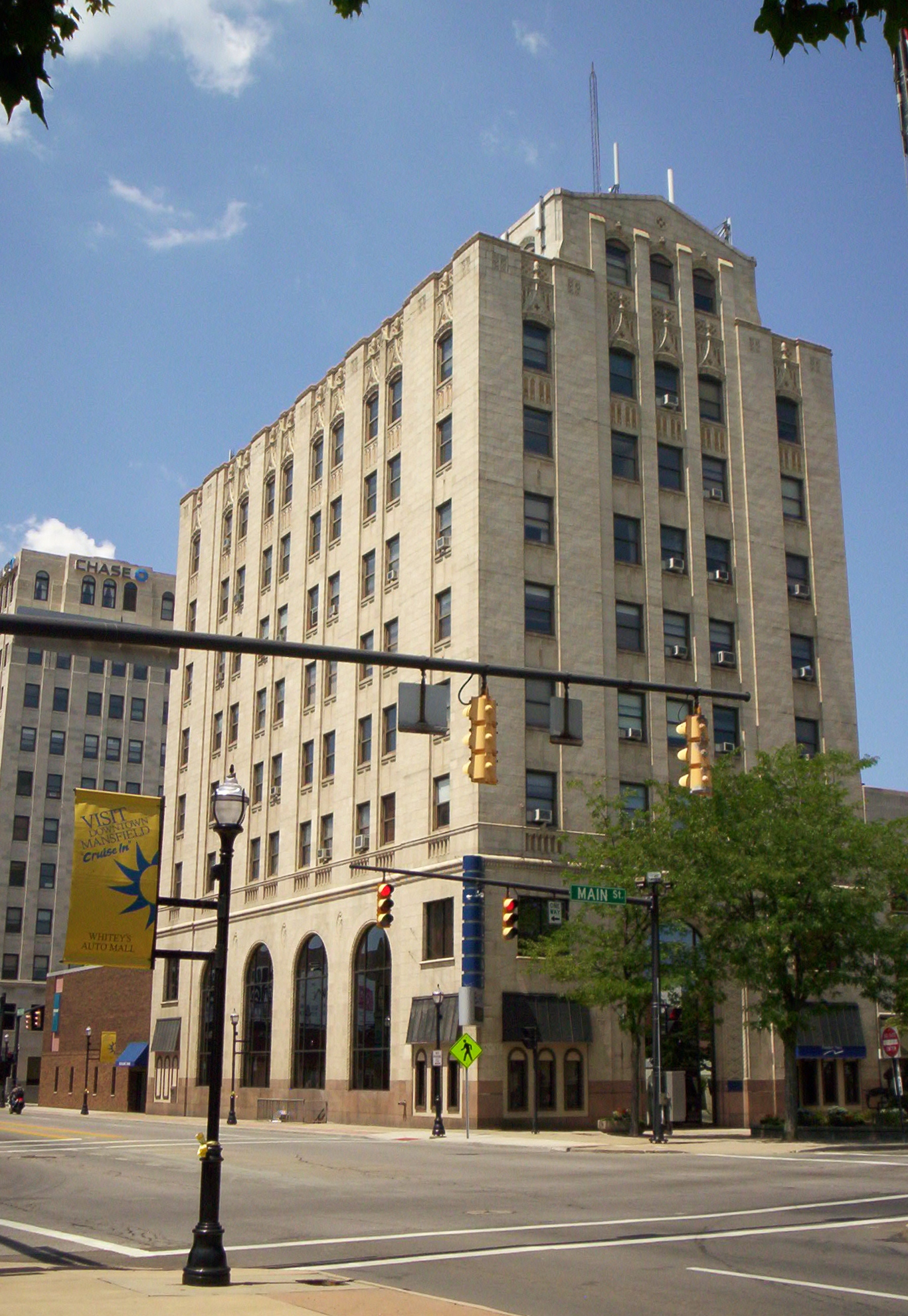

- Location within Ohio Location within the United States
- Location: Mansfield, Ohio, U.S.
- Coordinates: 40.758611°N 82.515833°W
- Built: 1929
- Architect: Althouse & Jones
- NRHP reference No.: 83002044
- Added to NRHP: July 8, 1983

The Richland Trust Building is a historic bank building in downtown Mansfield, Ohio. It was built in 1929 and listed on the National Register of Historic Places in 1983. The 9-story building was designed by Althouse & Jones and was also home to business and law offices as well as a shoe store. It is adorned with angel sculptures and was built during a building boom in Mansfield and elsewhere that preceded the stock market crash.

Althouse & Jones, a partnership between William L. Althouse and Mr. Herbert S. Jones in Mansfield, also designed the Park Avenue Baptist Church, another building on the National Register.

== See also ==
- National Register of Historic Places listings in Richland County, Ohio
