= James P. and Lydia Strang House =

Historic house in Utah, United States

- U.S. National Register of Historic Places
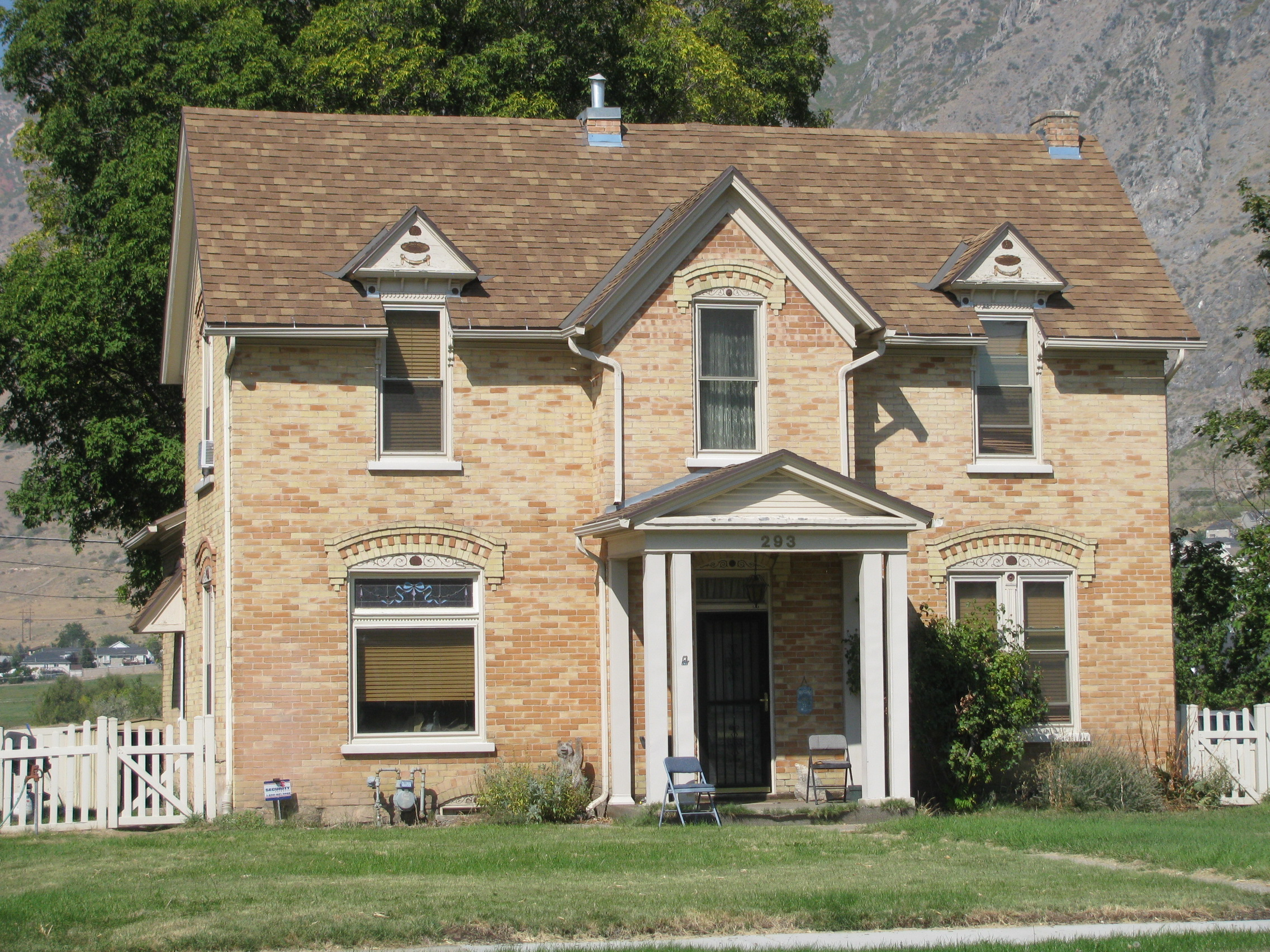
- 293 E 400 N

- Location within Utah Location within the United States
- Location: 293 E 400 N, Springville, Utah
- Coordinates: 40°10′23″N 111°36′15″W
- Area: 0.3 acres (0.12 ha)
- Built: 1895
- Architectural style: Late Victorian
- MPS: Springville MPS
- NRHP reference No.: 97001579
- Added to NRHP: January 5, 1998

The James P. and Lydia Strang House, at 293 E 400 N in Springville, Utah, was built in 1895. It was listed on the National Register of Historic Places in 1998.

== See also ==
- William and Ann Bringhurst House, NRHP-listed, nearby at 306 S. 200 W, which is incorrect address given in NRHP nomination form for the Strang House
