= Ward Hall =

Ward Hall may refer to:

- Ward Hall (Georgetown, Kentucky), listed on the National Register of Historic Places (NRHP)
- Ward Hall (Ward, South Dakota), listed on the National Register of Historic Places in Moody County
- Ward Memorial Hall, Wood, Wisconsin, NRHP-listed

== See also ==
- Ward Hill (disambiguation)
- Ward House (disambiguation)
