= Martin Bushnell House =

- U.S. National Register of Historic Places
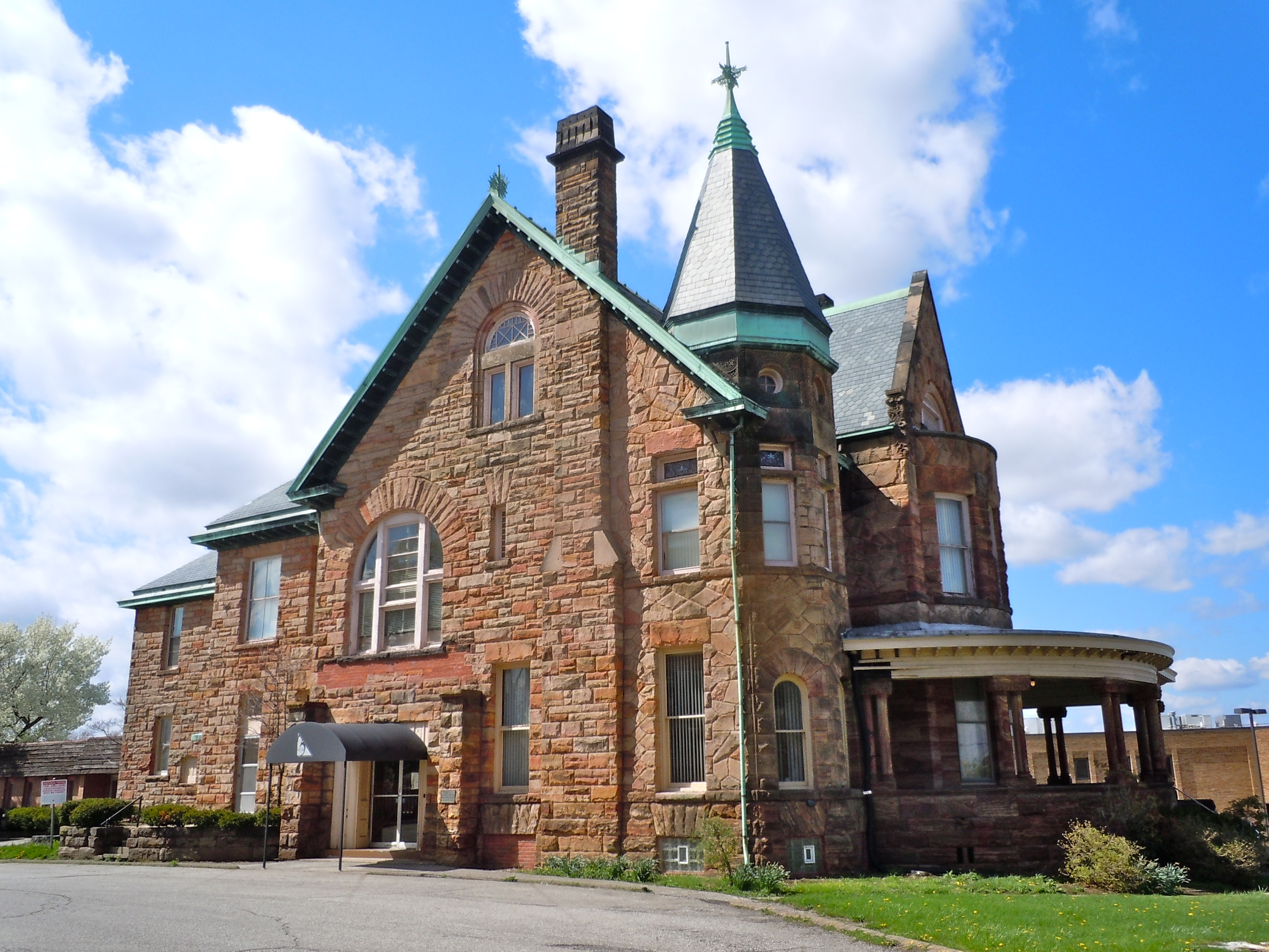
- Martin Bushenll House in 2011

- Location within Ohio Location within the United States
- Location: 34 Sturges Ave., Mansfield, Ohio
- Coordinates: 40°45′10″N 82°31′24″W
- Area: 1 acre (0.40 ha)
- Built: 1892
- Architectural style: Richardsonian Romanesque
- NRHP reference No.: 74001609
- Added to NRHP: April 26, 1974

The Martin Bushnell House is a historic residence in the city of Mansfield, Ohio, United States. Built in 1892, the house was home to Martin Bushnell, a prominent civic leader, businessman, and politician, and it has been named a historic site.

== Bushnell ==
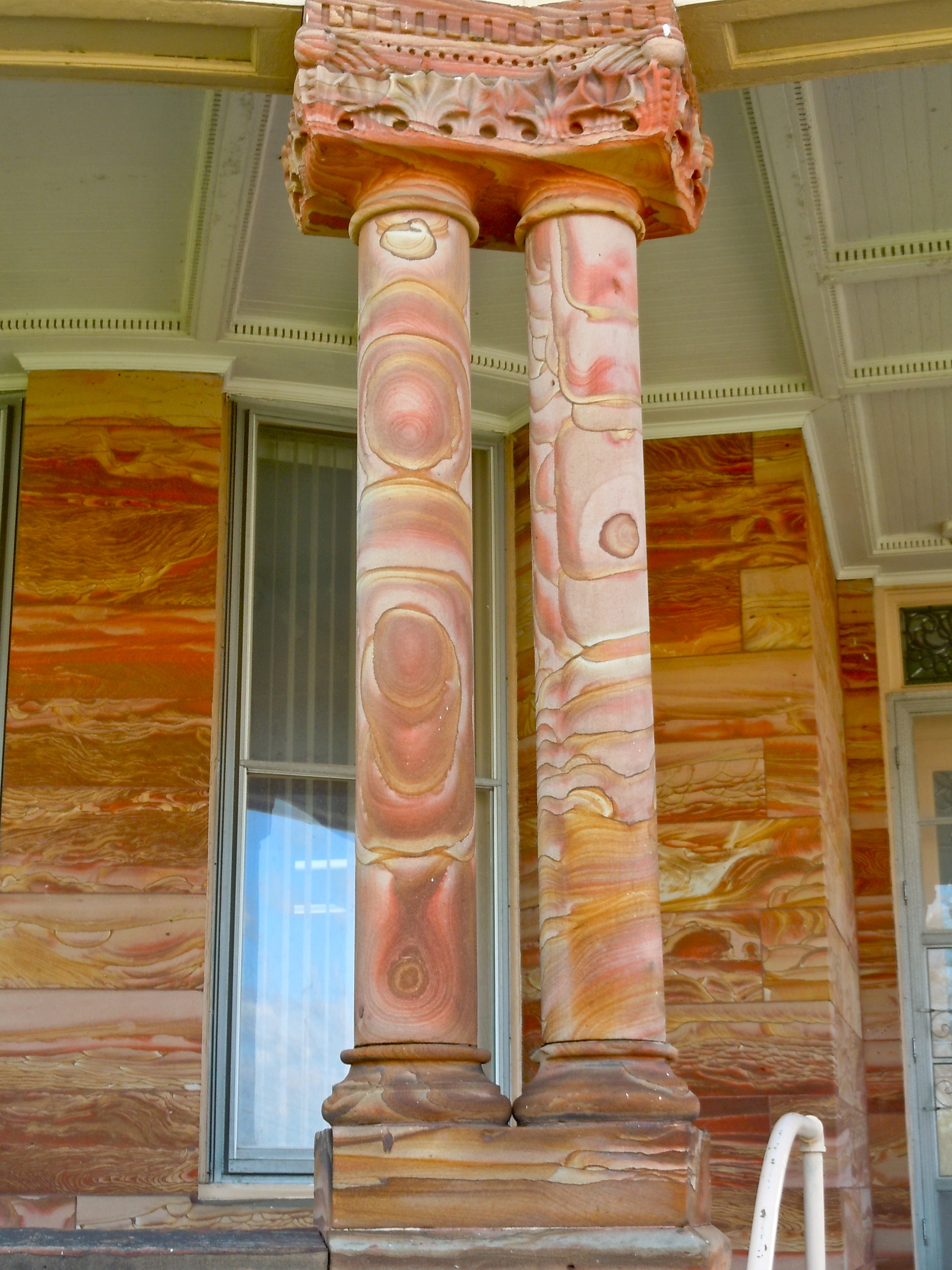
One of the pairs of columns on the porch

Born in 1837, Martin Bushnell was a member of one of Richland County's oldest families; his ancestors were pioneers who arrived in 1820. His father William served three terms in the Ohio House of Representatives, and Martin himself served one term in the Ohio Senate, beginning in 1897. Before entering into public office, Bushnell attended Denison University and worked for a succession of Mansfield companies, soon building himself into one of the city's leading businessmen. Erected in 1892, Bushnell's house became known as the home of the city's most prominent civic figures: Bushnell occupied the position of superintendent of city schools and served as a trustee for the Columbus State Hospital, and he further perpetuated his name by giving the city a Johnny Appleseed statue for placement in a public park.

== Architecture ==
Bushnell's house is a Richardsonian Romanesque structure built primarily of stone: besides the various stone types composing the foundation and walls, the house features a slate roof and elements of granite. A large porch is placed at the front of the house, with a semicircular bow window above the porch and a two-story octagonal tower to the side. The roofs are of various types: that of the tower rises to a steep point, while other sections are gabled. Vertical elements include numerous chimneys, placed at widely separated points on the roofline, as well as the paired columns that support the porch roof. Small oculi are built into several sides of the tower, above the second-story windows, while a semicircular window in the front gable overlooks the roof of the bow window. These elements combine to convey a sense of sheer mass, typical of houses built in the Richardsonian Romanesque style.

== Preservation ==
In 1974, the Bushnell House was listed on the National Register of Historic Places. One of more than ninety locations with this designation in Richland County, it qualified both because of its architecture and because of its place as the home of a prominent local resident.
