= Raemelton Farm Historic District =

Historic district in Ohio, United States

- U.S. National Register of Historic Places
- U.S. Historic district
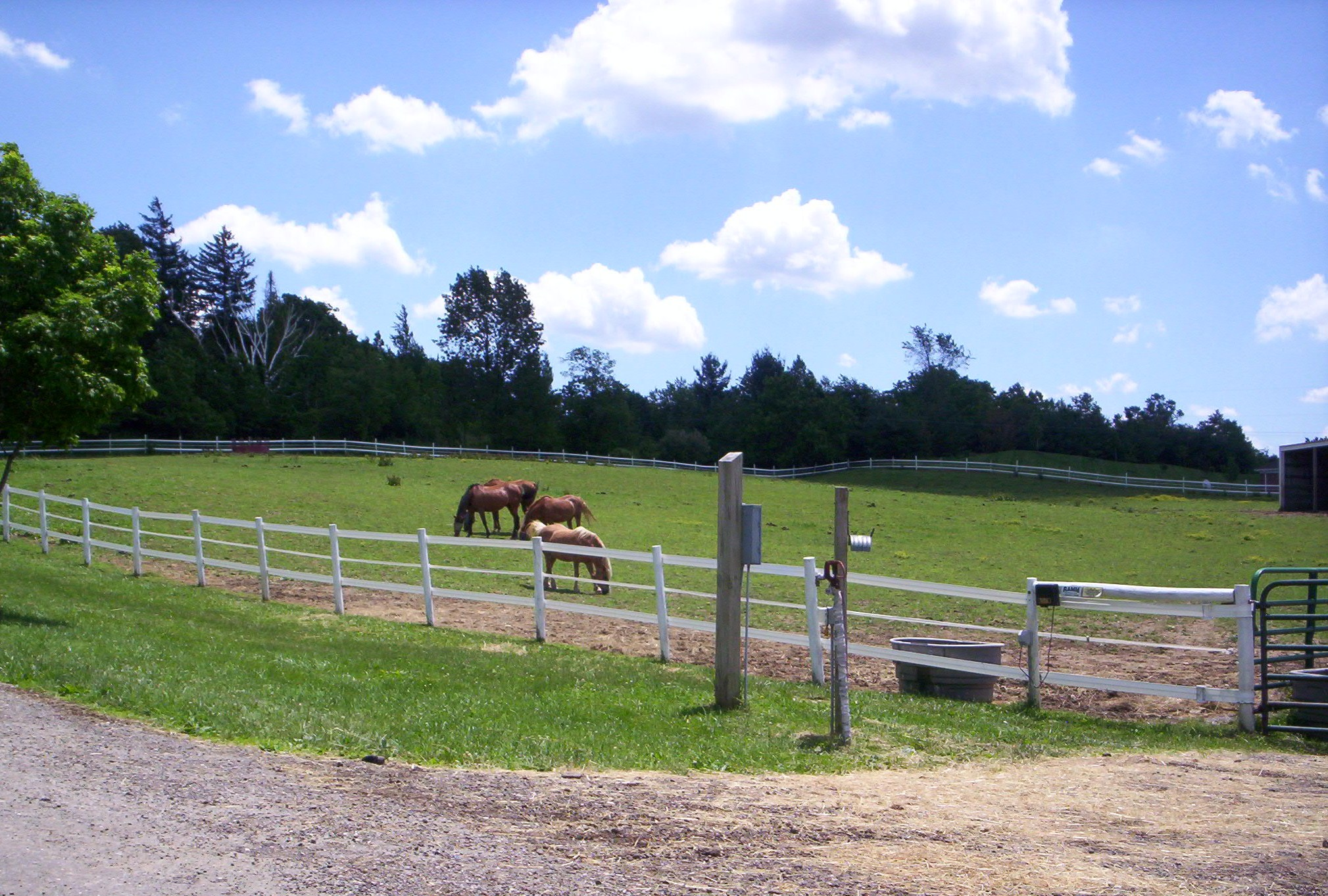
- Horses in a field at Raemelton

- Location within Ohio Location within the United States
- Location: Bounded by Marion Ave. and Millsboro and Trimble Rds., Mansfield, Ohio
- Coordinates: 40°44′36″N 82°32′53″W
- Area: 65 acres (26 ha)
- Architect: Marian Cruger Coffin, et al
- Architectural style: Greek Revival, Colonial Revival
- NRHP reference No.: 02001682
- Added to NRHP: January 8, 2003

The Raemelton Farm Historic District is a historic district in Mansfield, Ohio, United States. Composed of thirteen contributing properties, it was listed on the National Register of Historic Places in 2003. Among its buildings are examples of the Greek Revival and Colonial Revival styles of architecture, and it includes work by landscape architect Marian Cruger Coffin.

The center is a surviving part of a 2,000-acre (810 ha) estate owned by Frank Black, whose father had emigrated from Ramelton in County Donegal, Ireland. The main barn was built in 1850 and remodeled in 1929; it was destroyed and rebuilt after fires in 1932 and 1937.
