= Mitchell House (Little Rock, Arkansas) =

Historic house in Arkansas, United States

- Formerly listed on the U.S. National Register of Historic Places
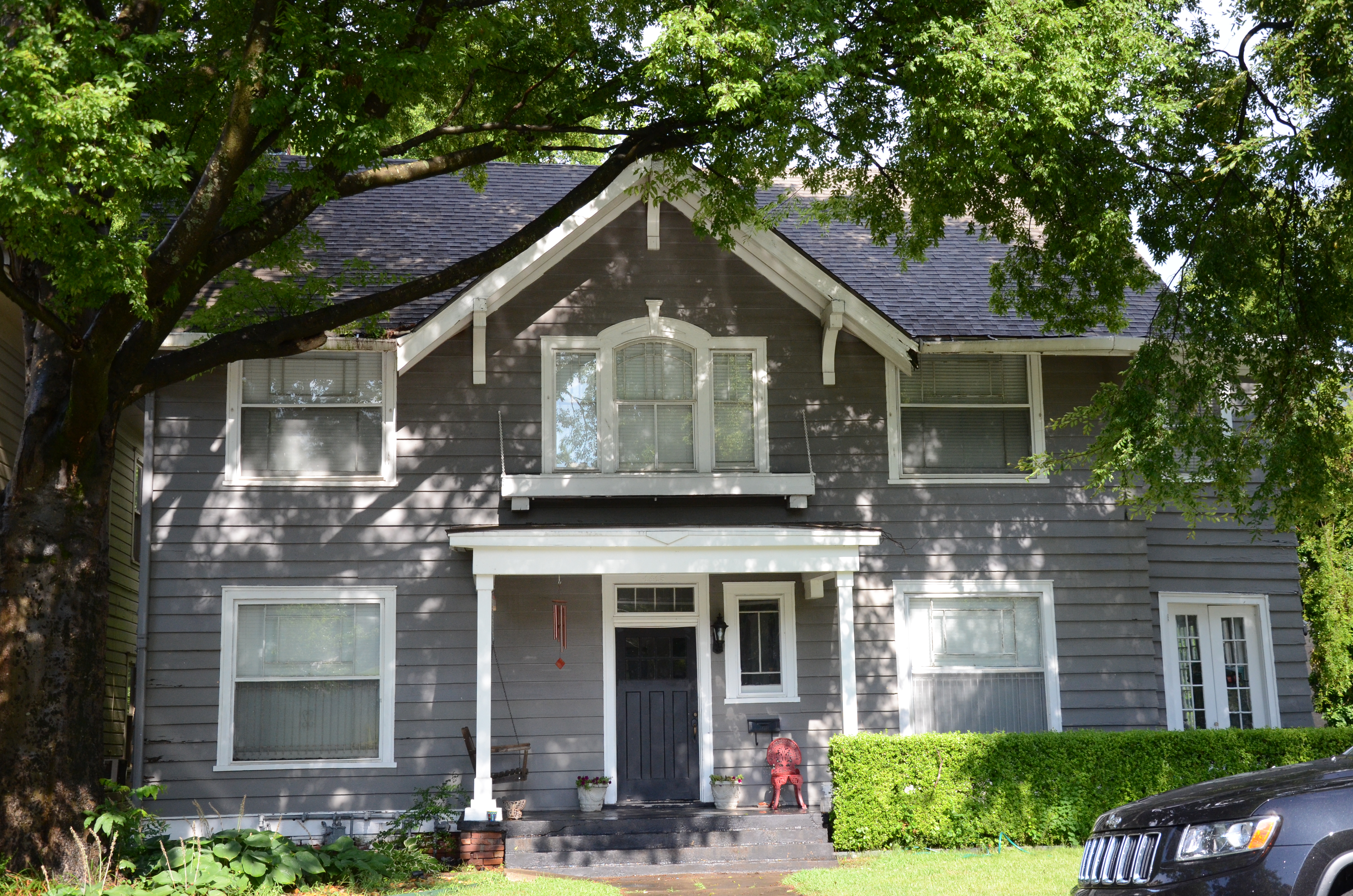

- Location within Arkansas Location within the United States
- Location: 1415 Spring St., Little Rock, Arkansas
- Coordinates: 34°44′6″N 92°16′34″W
- Area: less than one acre
- Built: 1911
- Architect: Charles L. Thompson
- Architectural style: Colonial Revival
- MPS: Thompson, Charles L., Design Collection TR
- NRHP reference No.: 82000910

Significant dates
- Added to NRHP: December 22, 1982
- Removed from NRHP: May 12, 2021

The Mitchell House is a historic house at 1415 Spring Street in Little Rock, Arkansas. It is a two-story frame structure with Colonial Revival and Craftsman features, designed by Charles L. Thompson and built in 1911. It has a three-bay facade, with wide sash windows flanking a center entrance and Palladian window. The center bay is topped by a gable that has large Craftsman-style brackets. A porch shelters the entrance, which is topped by a four-light transom window, and has a small fixed-pane window to its right.

The house was listed on the National Register of Historic Places in 1982, and was delisted in 2021.

== See also ==
- National Register of Historic Places listings in Little Rock, Arkansas
