= Ward Hill, Staten Island =

Coordinates: 40°38′00″N 74°04′57″W

Ward Hill is a hill and eponymous neighborhood located in the northeastern part of Staten Island, New York City. Ward Hill is the northernmost of a chain of hills that stretch approximately halfway across Staten Island, which at one point (on Todt Hill, toward the southern end of the chain) rises to 410 feet (125 m), the highest elevation found that close to the seabord south of Maine in the eastern United States.

== History ==
Named for Caleb T. Ward, who purchased property at the top of the hill in 1826, Ward Hill has long been home to the island's local political elite. His mansion, the Caleb T. Ward Mansion (Seth Geer, c. 1835) at 141 Nixon Avenue, is a New York City landmark and added to the National Register of Historic Places in 1982.

Part of Ward Hill's western slope consists of a sharp cliff overlooking Victory Boulevard in Tompkinsville.

== Trivia ==
One of the white picket-fenced houses on Edgar Terrace is the scene for Madonna's video "Papa Don't Preach" with Danny Aiello.
