= John Ward House (Newton, Massachusetts) =

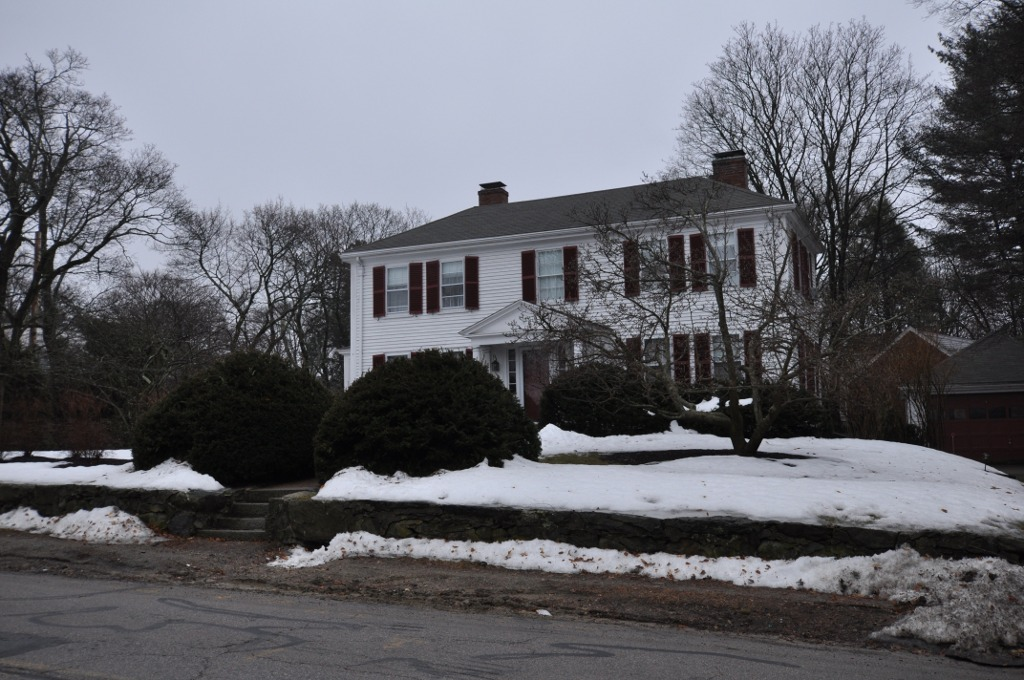
- Interactive map of the John Ward House area

General information
- Type: House
- Architectural style: Federal
- Location: 184 Ward St., Newton, Massachusetts
- Coordinates: 42.338523°N 71.180347°W
- Construction started: c.1805
- Governing body: Private

Dimensions
- Other dimensions: 0.9 acres (0.36 ha)

The John Ward House at 184 Ward Street in Newton, Massachusetts is a Federal style house. It was deemed eligible for listing on the National Register of Historic Places in 1986, but its owner objected to the listing.

The house is a circa 1805 house built in Federal style on a 18,752-square-foot (1,742.1 m^{2}) lot.

The house has a square plan with five bays on each side. It has a truncated hip roof, and its entrance is flanked by elongated pilasters.

Three comparable Federal houses along Ward street are:

- Charles Hyde House, 175 Ward Street, c. 1801
- Ephraim Ward House, 121 Ward Street, built in 1821
- John Harback House, 303 Ward Street, c. 1800

The latter two are individually listed on the NRHP.
