= Burch-Mitchell House =

Historic house in Georgia, United States

- U.S. National Register of Historic Places
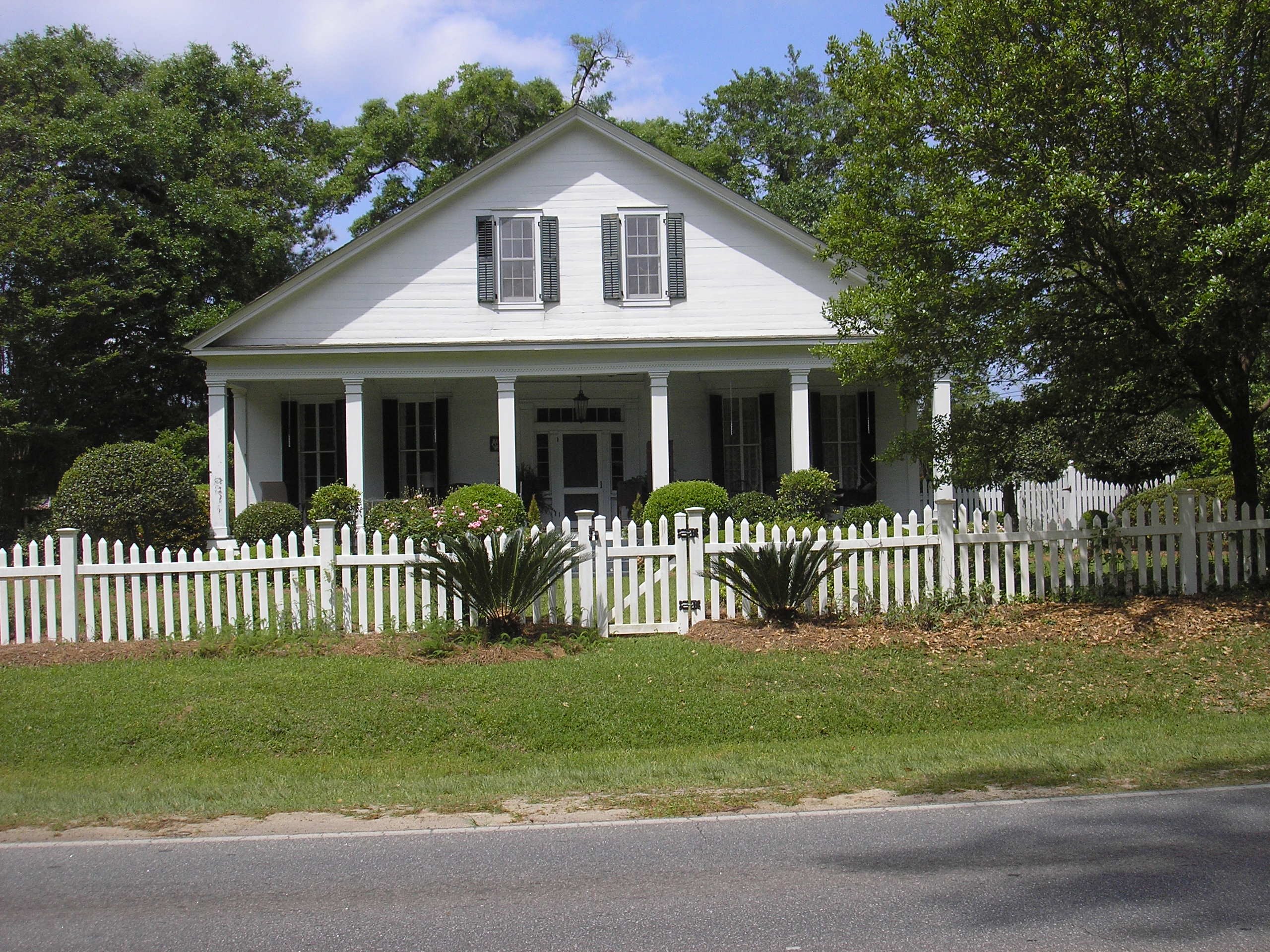

- Location within Georgia Location within the United States
- Location: 737 Remington Ave., Thomasville, Georgia
- Coordinates: 30°50′28″N 83°58′0″W
- Area: 0.5 acres (0.20 ha)
- Built: 1848
- Built by: Burch, Robert Sims; Et al.
- NRHP reference No.: 70000220
- Added to NRHP: September 4, 1970

The Burch-Mitchell House, also known as Munro House or as Mitchell House, located in Thomasville, Georgia, was built in 1848. It was listed on the National Register of Historic Places in 1970.

It was built by Robert Sims Burch using slave labor in 1856, built upon a c.1848 foundation. Its NRHP nomination describes it as "excellent" and as one of the finest cottages in Thomasville. It is a one-and-a-half-story building with a front gable second floor overhanging a front porch, supported by six square pillars. Its original detached kitchen and dining room were destroyed by a fire in 1888 and replacements were added to the main house. The house was originally set far back from the road, down a magnolia-lined lane, but it was moved forward to its existing location. The kitchen and dining room portion is now used as a house on an adjacent lot. The property was bought by the Mitchell family after the American Civil War and remained in that family for more than 90 years, until purchased by the Rev. and Mrs. B.G. Munro.

The first floor front of the house has four double-hung windows and a Greek Revival-style doorway with sidelights, transom, fluted pilasters, and paneled door. The pediment above has two windows off an unfinished attic space. The interior, as of 1969, had almost all of its original Greek Revival style woodwork, which was of high quality.
