= Mitchell House (Gentry, Arkansas) =

Historic house in Arkansas, United States

- U.S. National Register of Historic Places
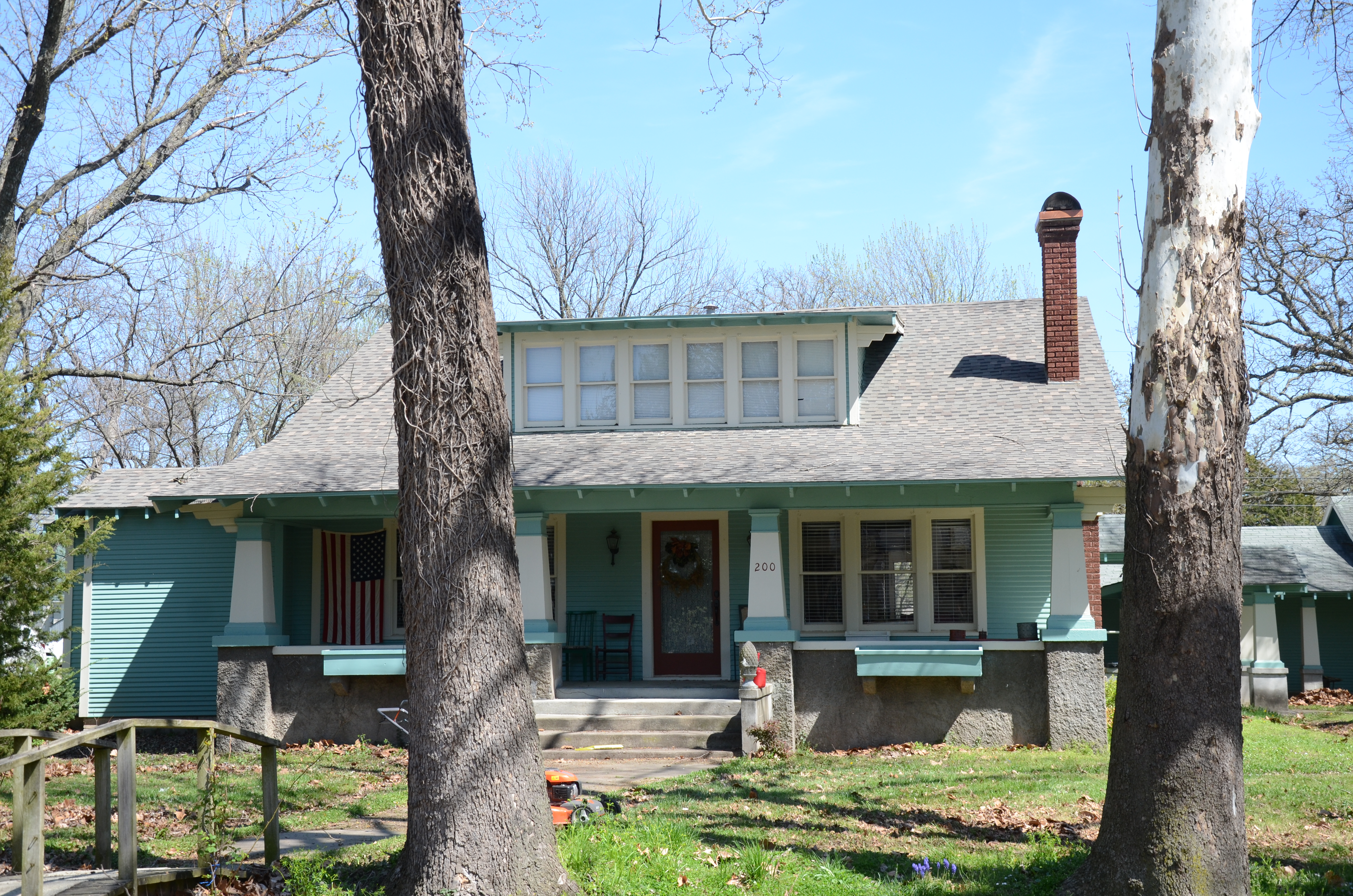

- Location within Arkansas Location within the United States
- Location: 115 N. Nelson, Gentry, Arkansas
- Coordinates: 36°16′9″N 94°28′55″W
- Area: less than one acre
- Built: 1927
- Architectural style: Bungalow/craftsman
- MPS: Benton County MRA
- NRHP reference No.: 87002423
- Added to NRHP: January 28, 1988

The Mitchell House is a historic house at 115 North Nelson in Gentry, Arkansas. Built in 1927, it is the finest local example of Craftsman architecture. It is a 1 1/2-story wood-frame structure, with a side-gable roof that extends over the front porch. The roof's wide eaves and porch area have exposed rafter ends and large brackets typical of the style, and there are wide shed roof dormers at the front and rear.

The house was listed on the National Register of Historic Places in 1988.

== See also ==
- Mitchell–Ward House (Gentry, Arkansas)
- National Register of Historic Places listings in Benton County, Arkansas
