= Caleb T. Ward Mansion =

Historic house in Staten Island, New York

- U.S. National Register of Historic Places
- New York City Landmark
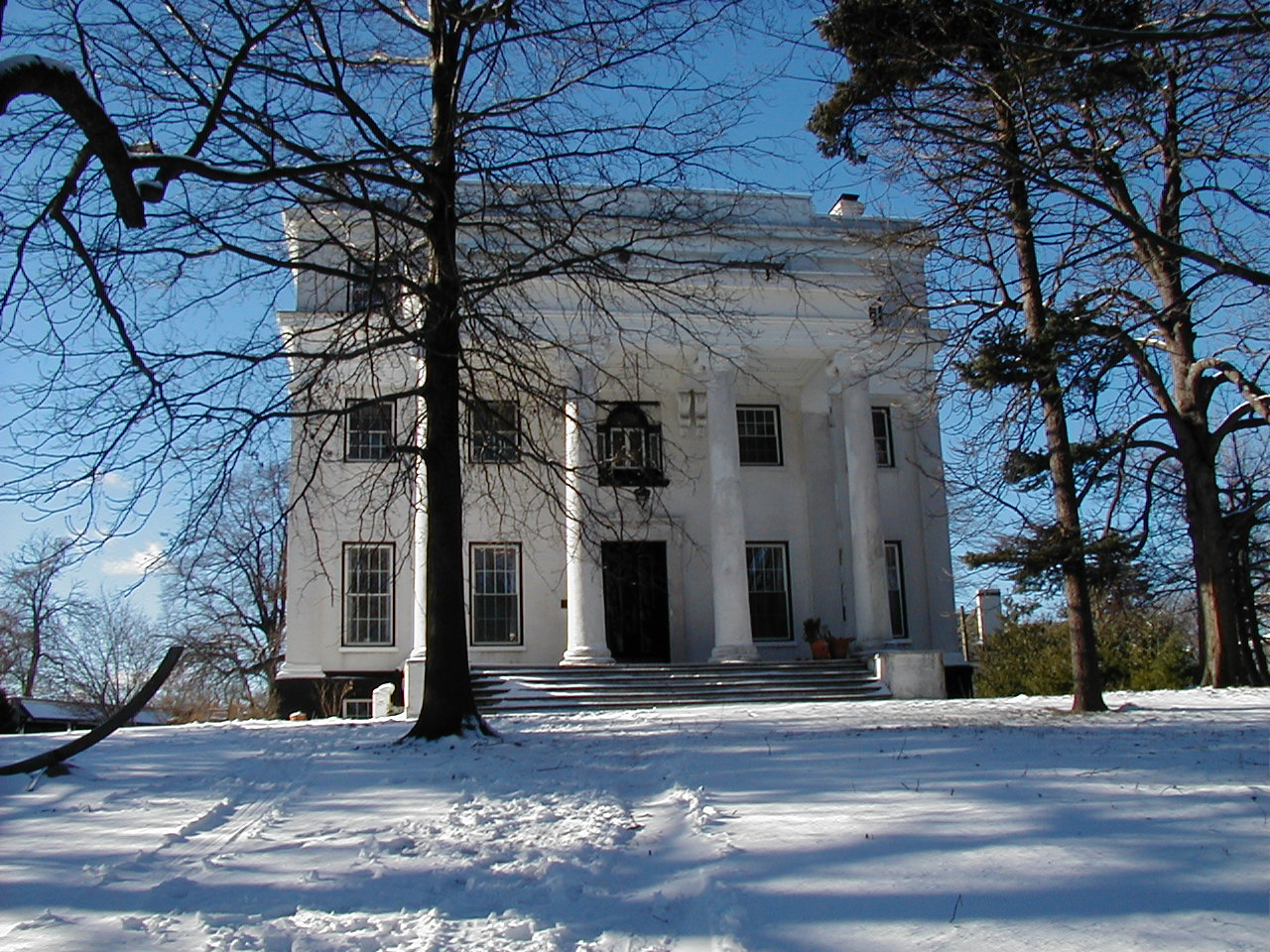

- Location within New York City Location within New York Location within the United States
- Location: 141 Nixon Ave., Staten Island, New York
- Coordinates: 40°37′57″N 74°4′53″W
- Area: 3 acres (1.2 ha)
- Built: 1835
- Architect: Davis, George B.
- Architectural style: Greek Revival
- NRHP reference No.: 82003401
- NYCL No.: 1002

Significant dates
- Added to NRHP: July 26, 1982
- Designated NYCL: August 22, 1978

Caleb T. Ward Mansion is a historic home located at 141 Nixon Avenue on Ward Hill, Staten Island, New York. Caleb Tompkins Ward built the mansion in 1835 with the help of architect George B. David, who built the mansion out of stucco and brick in an imposing Greek Revival style. Ward acquired the land for his mansion in 1826, after his uncle died. His uncle was Daniel D. Tompkins, Governor of New York.

The mansion commands scenic views of New York Harbor and the metropolitan area. It has a two-story tetra style portico and ionic columns. A large rectangular cupola tops the building and an estate of 250 acres originally surrounded the manor. Today, Ward Mansion is one of the last great houses remaining from a time when the North shore of Staten Island was a fashionable resort for wealthy New Yorkers.

On July 26, 1982, the mansion was added to the National Register of Historic Places, after having become a New York City Landmark in 1978.

== See also ==
- List of New York City Designated Landmarks in Staten Island
- National Register of Historic Places listings in Richmond County, New York
