= Park Avenue Baptist Church =

Historic church in Ohio, United States

- U.S. National Register of Historic Places
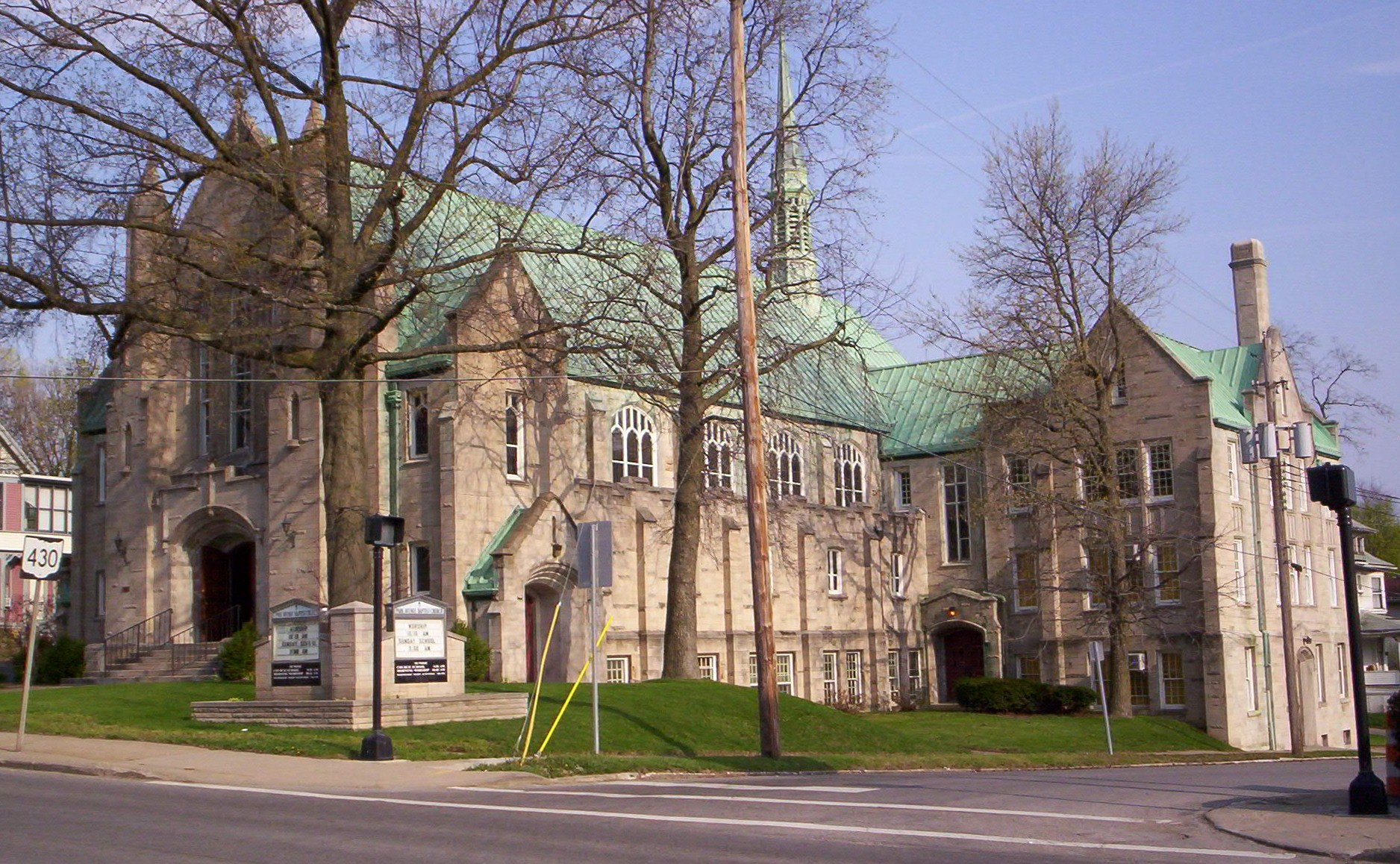

- Location within Ohio Location within the United States
- Location: 296 Park Ave., W., Mansfield, Ohio
- Coordinates: 40°45′34″N 82°31′34″W
- Area: 1.5 acres (0.61 ha)
- Built: 1928
- Architect: Althouse & Jones; Simon Small & Sons
- Architectural style: Neo-Gothic Revival
- MPS: Park Avenue West MRA
- NRHP reference No.: 83002043
- Added to NRHP: July 8, 1983

Park Avenue Baptist Church is a historic church at 296 Park Ave., West in Mansfield, Ohio.

It was built in 1928 and added to the National Register of Historic Places in 1983.

The Mansfield-based firm of Althouse & Jones also designed the Richland Trust Building.
