= Mitchell-Estes Farmstead =

- Mitchell--Estes Farmstead
- U.S. National Register of Historic Places
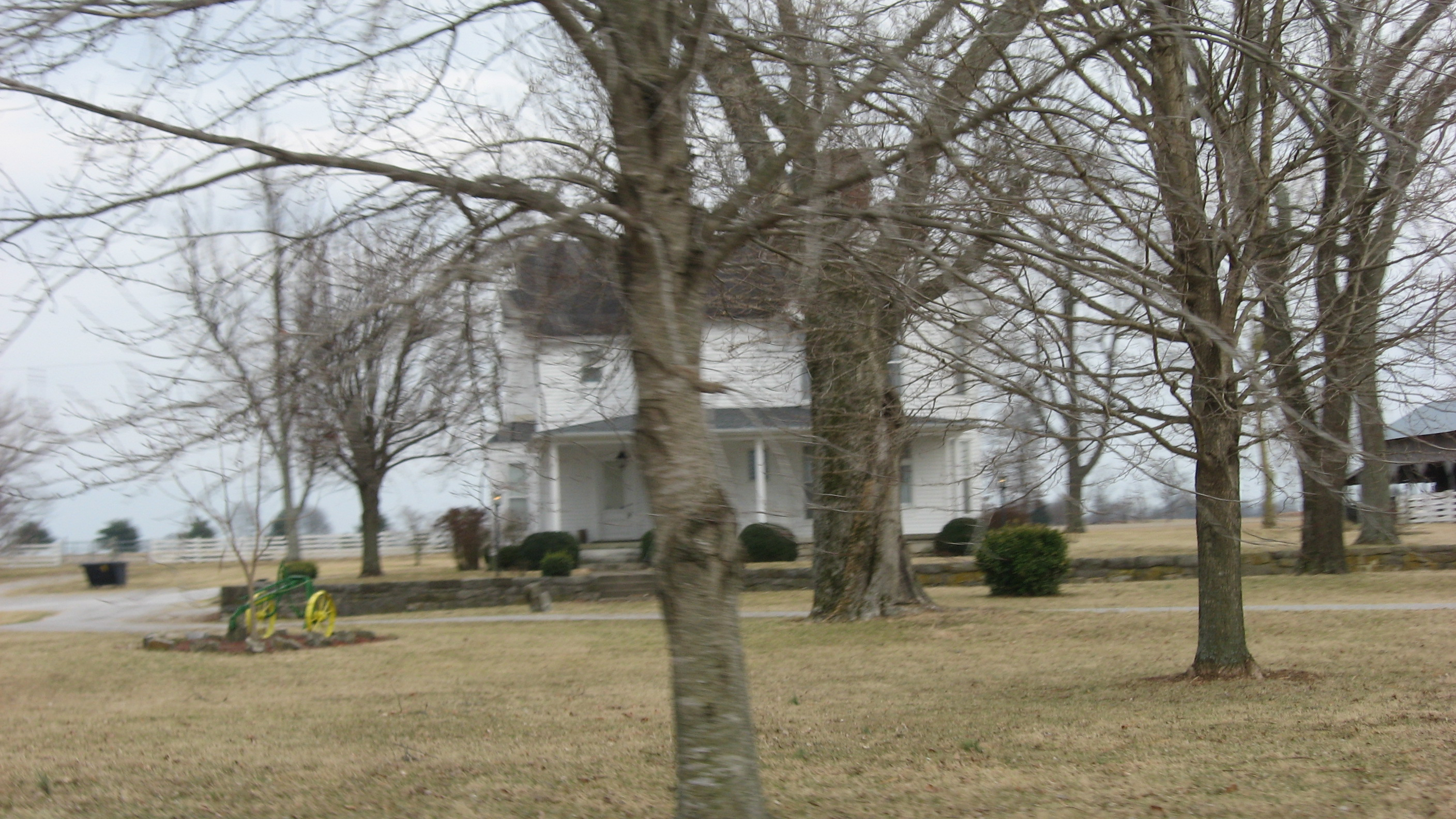

- Location within Kentucky Location within the United States
- Location: 1706 Upper Smiths Grove Rd., about 1.25 miles (2.01 km) north of Smiths Grove, Kentucky
- Coordinates: 37°04′36″N 86°11′29″W
- Area: 94 acres (38 ha)
- Built: 1892
- Architectural style: Queen Anne
- NRHP reference No.: 95001528
- Added to NRHP: January 11, 1996

The Mitchell-Estes Farmstead, in Edmonson and Warren counties near Smiths Grove, Kentucky is a historic site which was listed on the National Register of Historic Places in 1996. The listing included two contributing buildings and a contributing site on 94 acres (38 ha).

The main house is a vernacular building, built of limestone and yellow poplar wood, with ornamentation that is Queen Anne free classic in style. The house was originally 49 by 40 feet (15 m × 12 m) in plan and has a 50 by 40 feet (15 m × 12 m) rear addition. It has also been known as the Old Jack White Homestead.
