= Thornton Ward Estate =

Historic house in Illinois, United States

- U.S. National Register of Historic Places
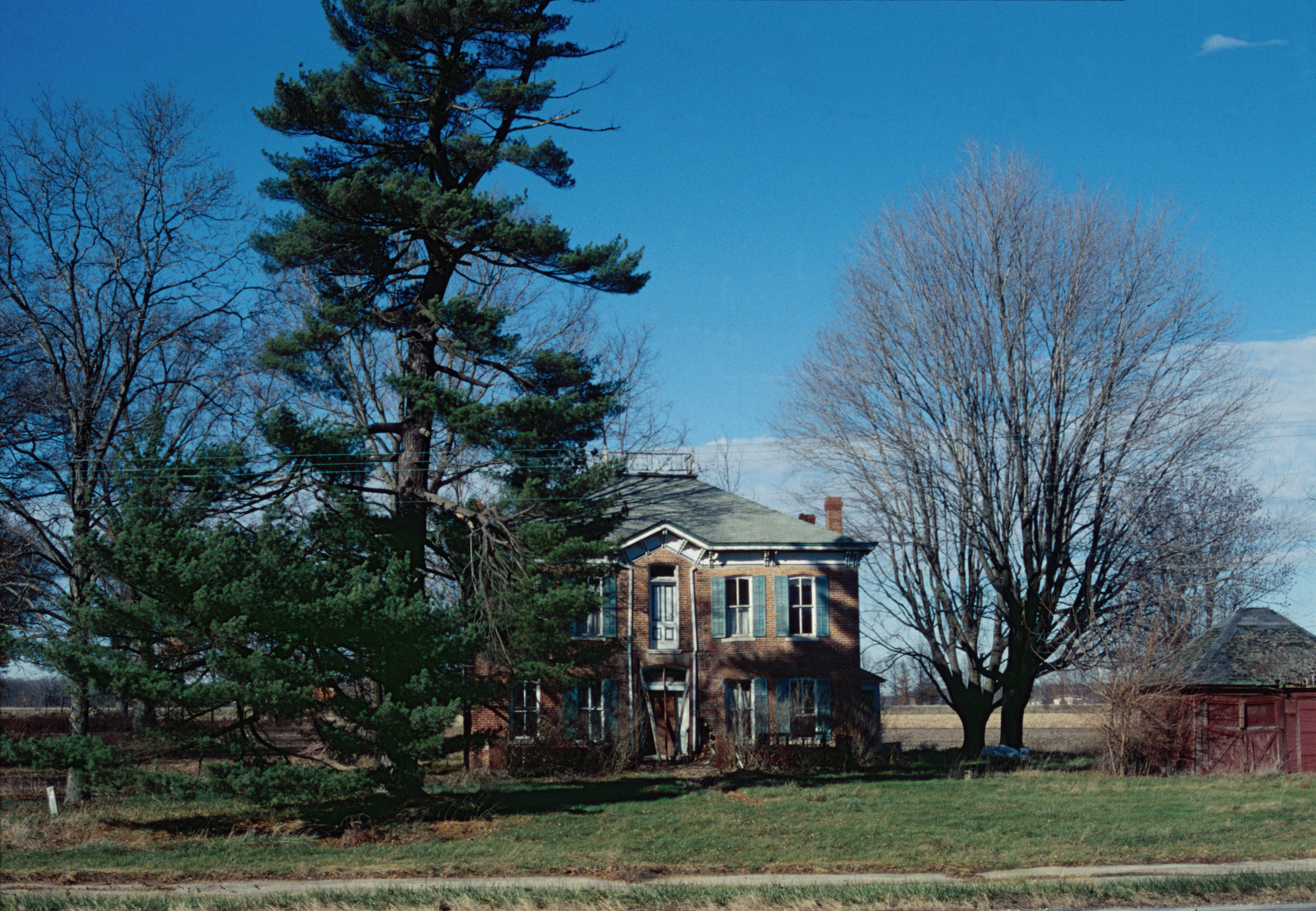
- Front of the farmhouse

- Location within Illinois Location within the United States
- Location: 1387 U.S. Route 40
- Nearest city: Toledo, Illinois
- Coordinates: 39°13′40″N 88°12′51″W
- Area: 10.6 acres (4.3 ha)
- Built: 1875
- Architectural style: Italianate
- NRHP reference No.: 01001308
- Added to NRHP: December 4, 2001

Thornton Ward Estate is a historic rural estate located at 1387 U.S. Route 40 south-southeast of Toledo, Illinois. The main building on the estate, an Italianate house, was constructed circa 1875 by the Ward family. The two-story brick home has a symmetrical front with two windows on each story on either side of the entry. The entrance features a double door topped by an arched transom; a single panel door is located directly above the entrance on the second floor. The home's hipped roof features a small gable above the entrance and is topped by a widow's walk. The estate also includes a section of the original National Road.

The estate was added to the National Register of Historic Places on December 4, 2001.
