= Central Methodist Episcopal Church =

Central Methodist Episcopal Church may refer to:

- Central Methodist Episcopal Church (Lansing, Michigan), listed on the National Register of Historic Places in Ingham County, Michigan
- Central Methodist Episcopal Church (Sault Ste. Marie, Michigan), listed on the National Register of Historic Places in Chippewa County, Michigan
