= Jacob H. Barr House =

Historic home in Mansfield, Ohio, US

- U.S. National Register of Historic Places
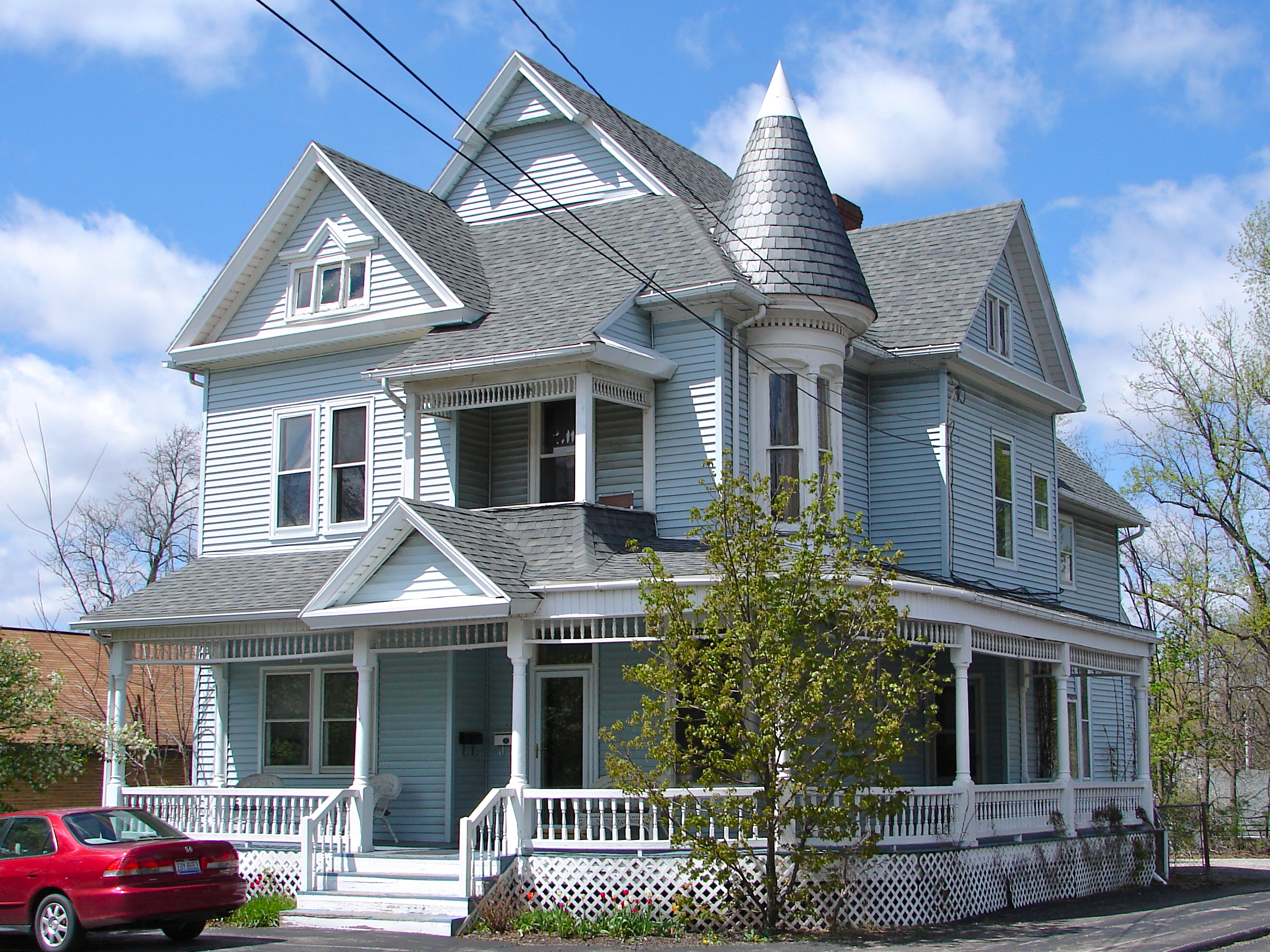
- The Jacob H. Barr House

- Location within Ohio
- Location: 646 Park Ave., W., Mansfield, Ohio
- Coordinates: 40°45′34″N 82°32′20″W
- Area: less than one acre
- Built: 1890
- Architectural style: Queen Anne
- MPS: Park Avenue West MRA
- NRHP reference No.: 83002023
- Added to NRHP: July 8, 1983

The Jacob H. Barr House is a historic home in Mansfield, Ohio. It was the city residence of farm owner Jacob Harrison Barr. It is listed on the National Register of Historic Places. It was built c. 1890 in a Queen Anne architecture style.
