= Patrick L. and Rose O. Ward House =

Historic house in Utah, United States

- U.S. National Register of Historic Places
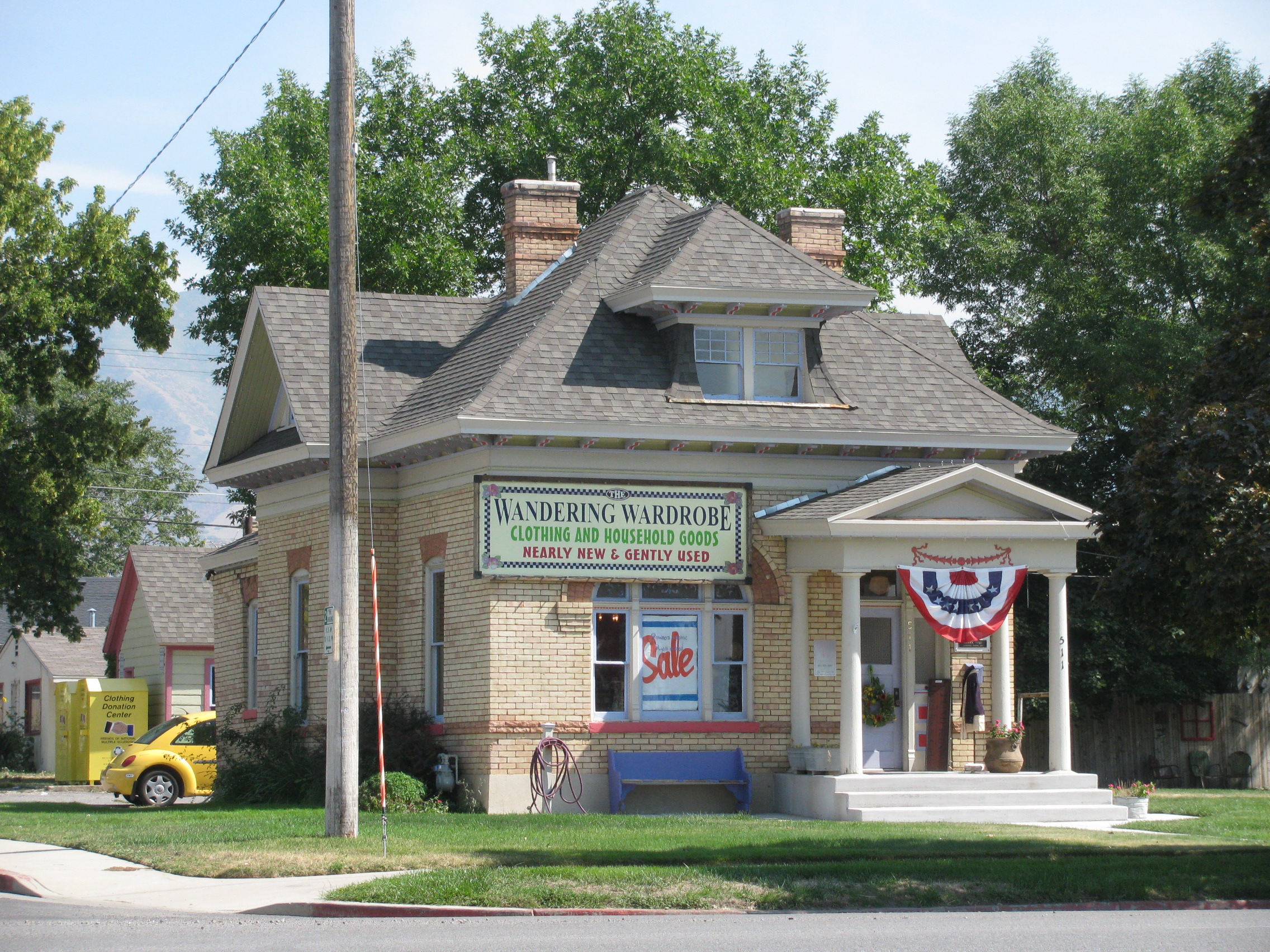

- Location within Utah Location within the United States
- Location: 511 S Main St., Springville, Utah
- Coordinates: 40°9′35″N 111°36′34″W
- Area: 0.2 acres (0.081 ha)
- Built: 1900
- Architectural style: Late Victorian
- MPS: Springville MPS
- NRHP reference No.: 97001580
- Added to NRHP: January 5, 1998

The Patrick L. and Rose O. Ward House at 511 S Main St. in Springville, Utah, United States, was built in 1900. It was listed on the National Register of Historic Places in 1998.

It was home of Patrick L. Ward, station master and superintendent of the Denver and Rio Grande Railroad in Springville.
