= Central Methodist Church (Spartanburg, South Carolina) =

Historic church in South Carolina, United States

- Central United Methodist Church
- U.S. National Register of Historic Places
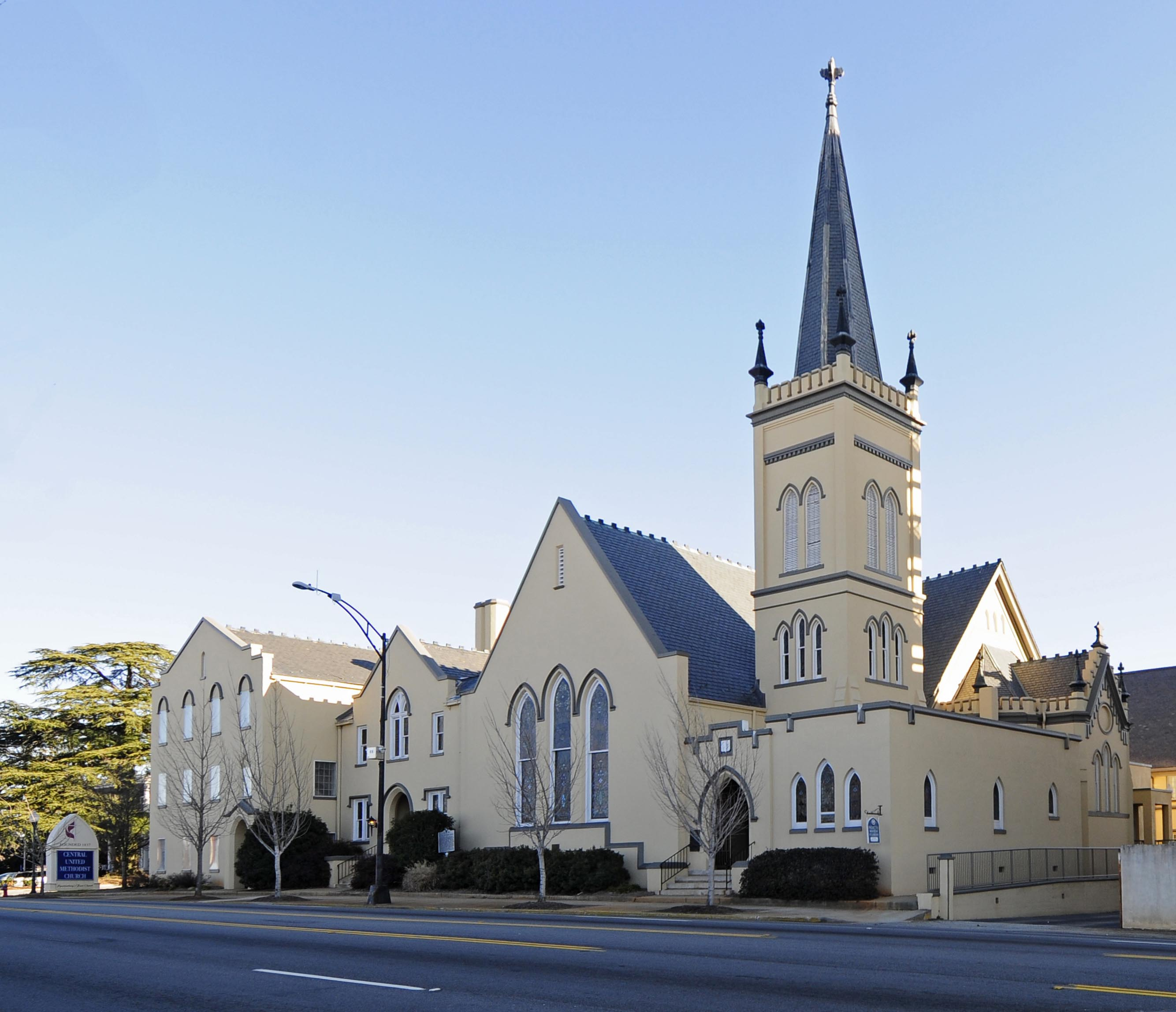
- Central Methodist Church of Spartanburg

- Location within South Carolina Location within the United States
- Location: 233 N. Church St., Spartanburg, South Carolina
- Coordinates: 34°57′9″N 81°56′0″W
- Area: less than one acre
- Built: 1880s; remodeled 1896
- Architects: Barber, George F.; et al.
- Architectural style: Gothic Revival
- NRHP reference No.: 03001002
- Added to NRHP: October 3, 2003

Central United Methodist Church is a historic church at 233 N. Church Street in Spartanburg, South Carolina.

It was built in the 1880s, and remodeled in 1896 by architect George F. Barber. It was added to the National Register in 2003.
