= Buttonwoods Museum =

Coordinates: 42.7833°N 71.0596°W

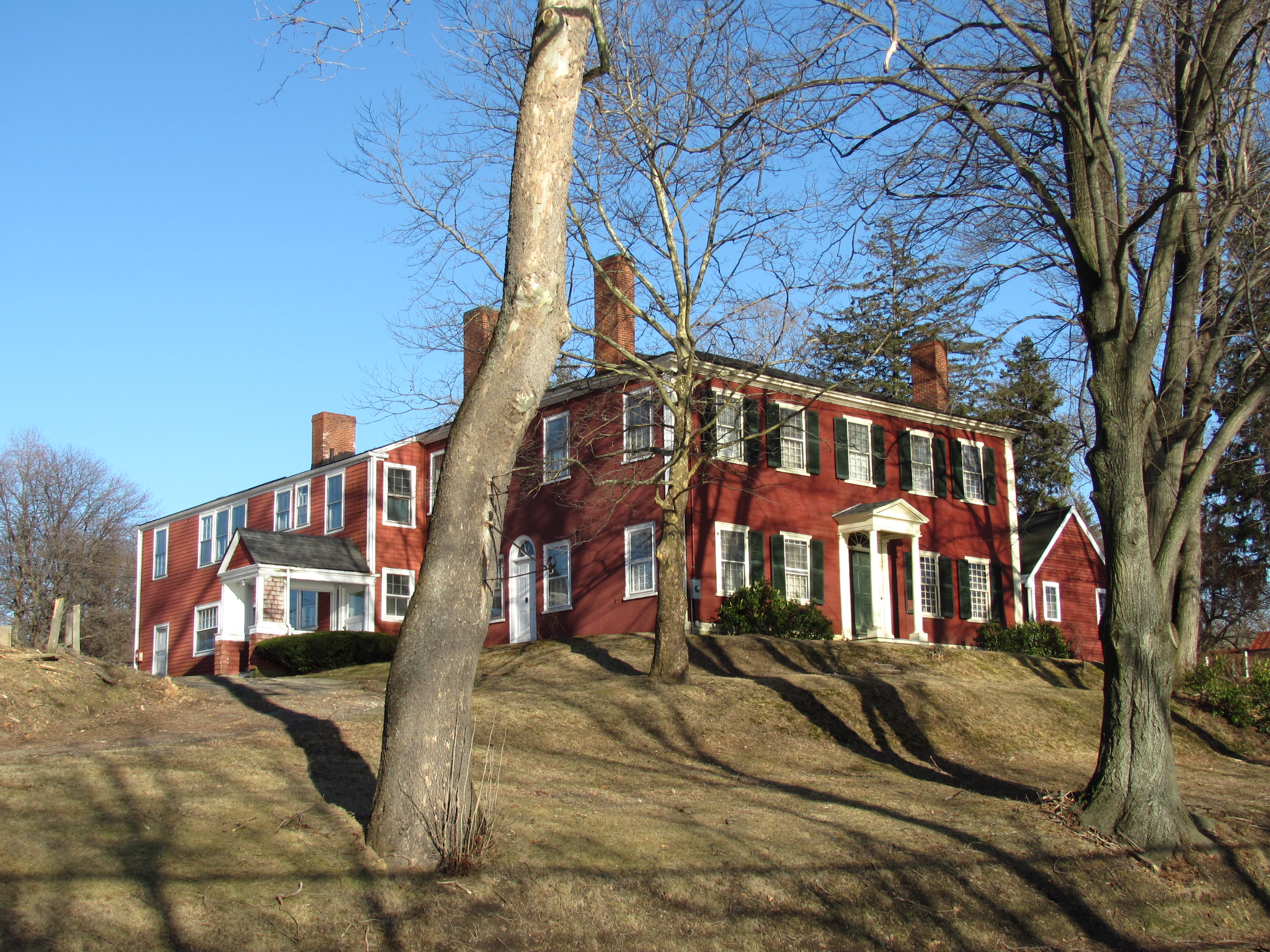
Buttonwoods

The Buttonwoods Museum is a museum operated by the Haverhill Historical Society in Haverhill, Massachusetts, in the Merrimack Valley.

The museum includes a John Ward House, a Duncan House, and the Daniel Hunkins Shoe Shop.
