= Ephraim Ward House =

Historic house in Massachusetts, United States

- U.S. National Register of Historic Places
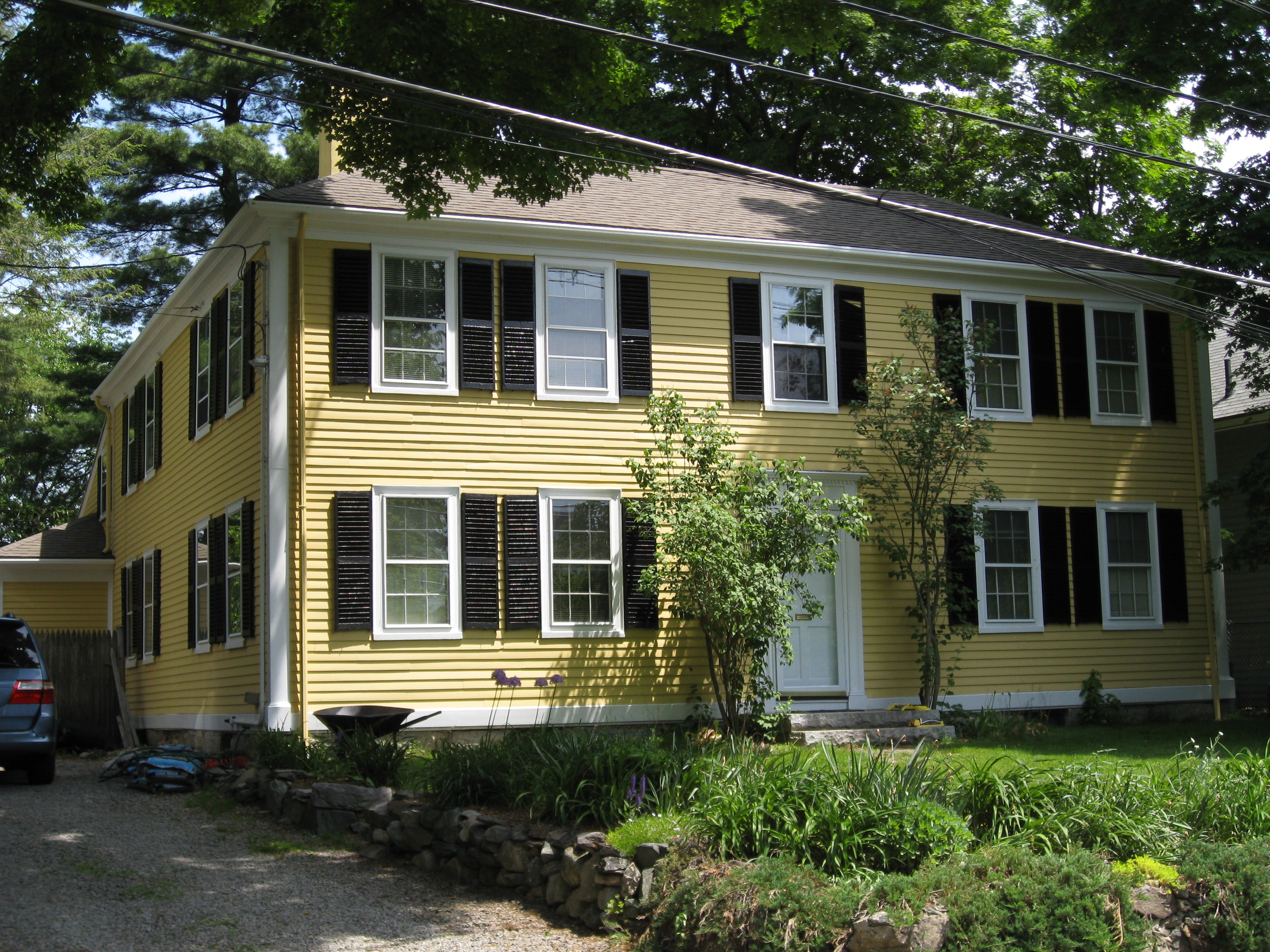
- Ephraim Ward House

- Location within Massachusetts Location within the United States
- Location: 121 Ward St., Newton, Massachusetts
- Coordinates: 42°20′17.0″N 71°10′38.7″W
- Built: 1821
- Architectural style: Federal
- MPS: Newton MRA
- NRHP reference No.: 86001894
- Added to NRHP: September 4, 1986

The Ephraim Ward House is a historic house at 121 Ward Street in Newton, Massachusetts. The two-story wood-frame house was built in 1821, and is one of a few Federal style houses in eastern Newton. This house was built by Ephraim Ward to replace one built by his ancestor, John Ward, in 1661 on the same site. The Wards owned farmland in the area until the early 20th century. The house is five bays wide, with a hip roof and clapboard siding, and a central entrance flanked by pilasters and topped by a paneled entablature.

The house was listed on the National Register of Historic Places in 1986.

== See also ==
- National Register of Historic Places listings in Newton, Massachusetts
