= Springville Historic District (Springville, Utah) =

Historic district in Utah, United States

- U.S. National Register of Historic Places
- U.S. Historic district
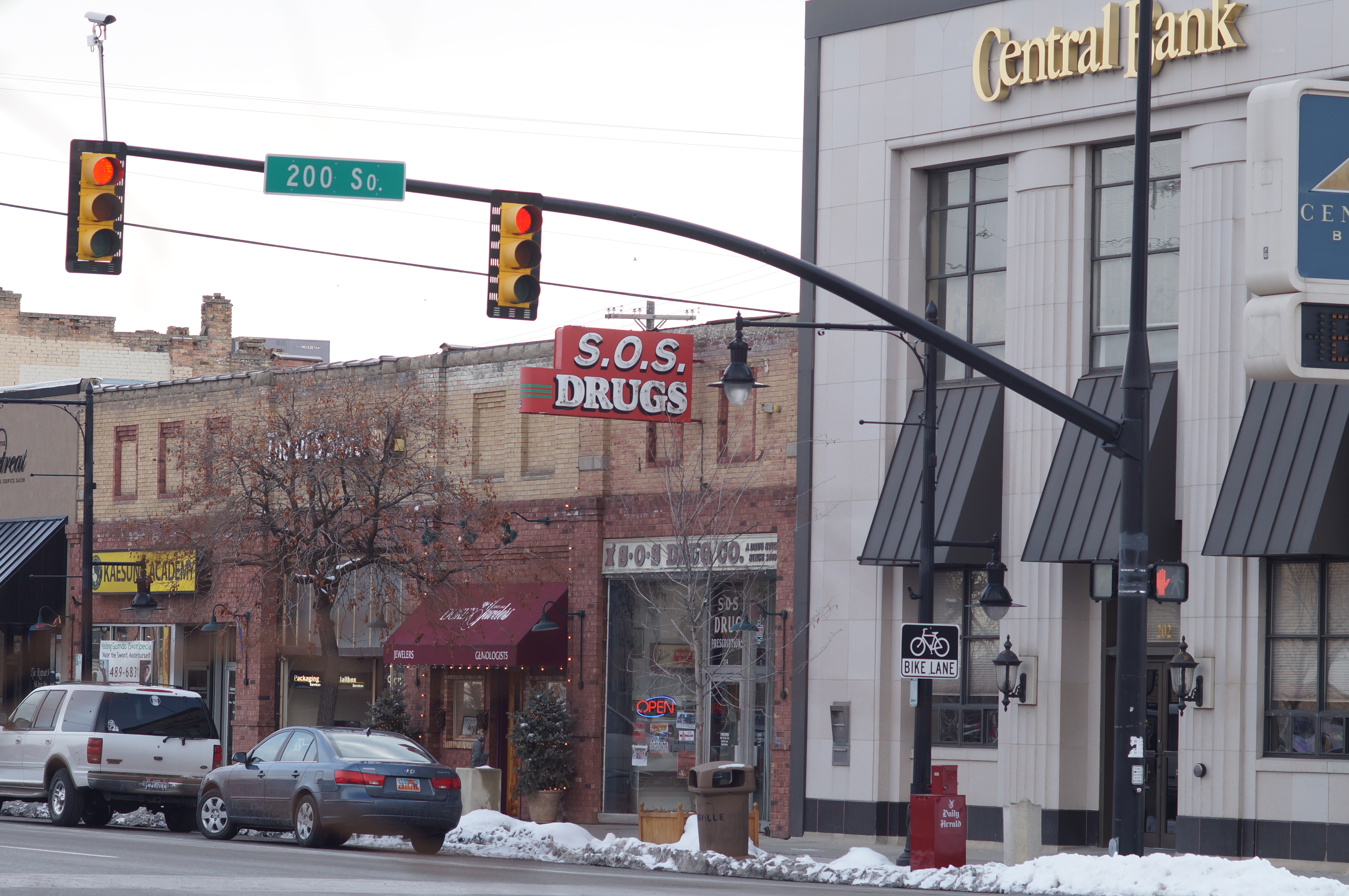
- Central Bank and SOS Drug, a few of the buildings within the Springville Historic District, February 2013

- Location within Utah Location within the United States
- Location: Roughly bounded by 400 North, 400 East, 800 South, Main Street, 400 South and 400 West; Springville, Utah; United States
- Area: 500 acres (200 ha)
- Architectural style: Late 19th and Early 20th Century American Movements
- MPS: Springville MPS
- NRHP reference No.: 03000157
- Added to NRHP: January 21, 2004

The Springville Historic District is a historic district in Springville, Utah, United States, that is listed on the National Register of Historic Places (NRHP).

== Description ==
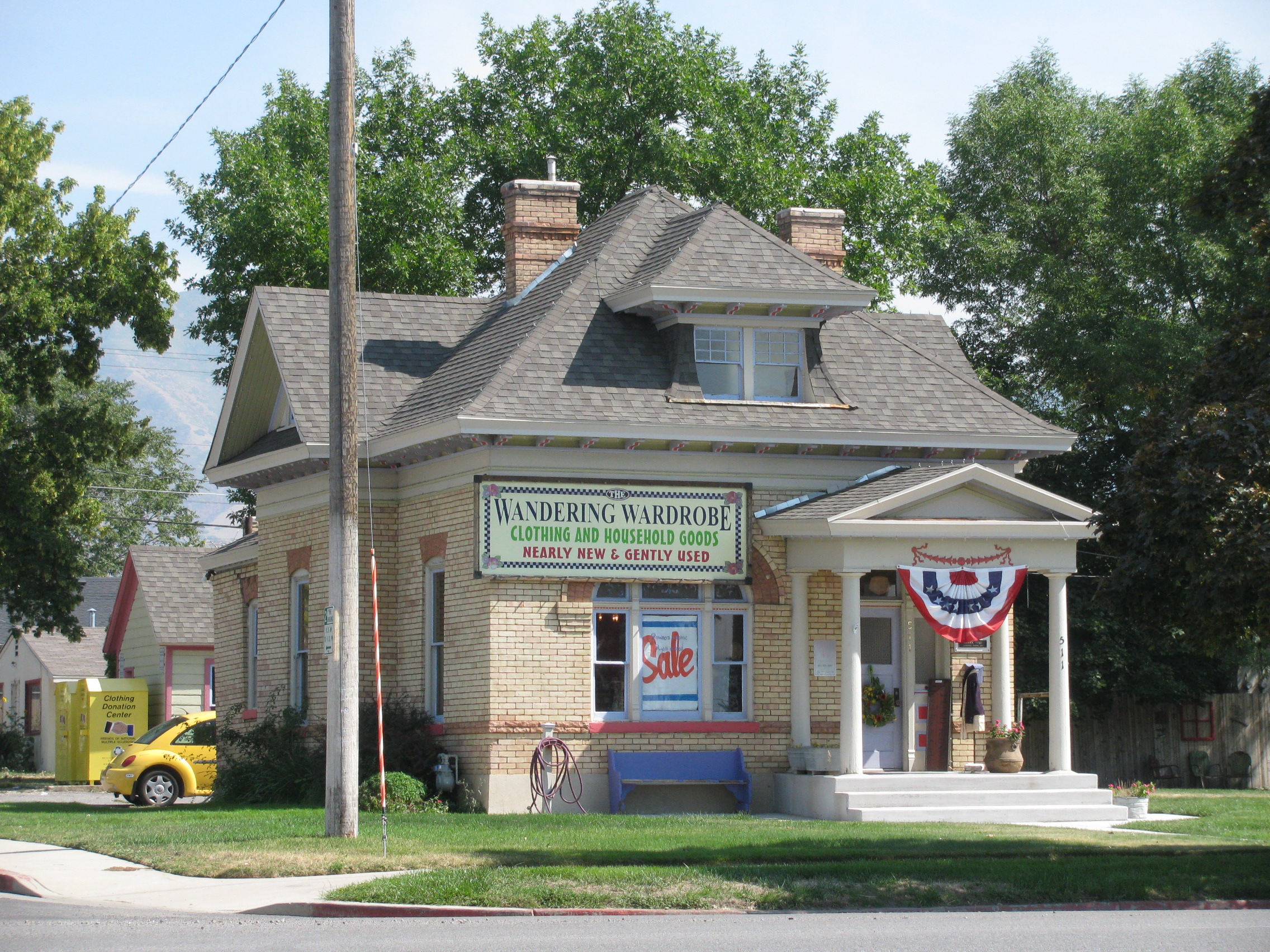
The Patrick L. and Rose O. Ward House, September 2012

The 500-acre (200 ha) district includes Late 19th and Early 20th Century American Movements and other architecture among its 1,211 contributing resources. Within the boundaries of district are more than two dozen properties (mostly houses) that are individually listed on the National Register of Historic Places. Moreover, with a single exception, all the properties within Springville included on the register are located within the boundaries of the district.

According to its NRHP nomination it "is an upside-down-Utah-shaped district comprising the original Springville town site and an extension of the city's historic neighborhoods to the southeast." It includes 919 primary contributing buildings and 292 garages and other outbuildings that are contributing, out of 1,260 primary buildings and 707 outbuildings in the district area.

The district was listed on the NRHP January 21, 2004

== See also ==
- National Register of Historic Places listings in Utah County, Utah
