= John Q.A. Ward House =

Historic house in Ohio, United States

- U.S. National Register of Historic Places
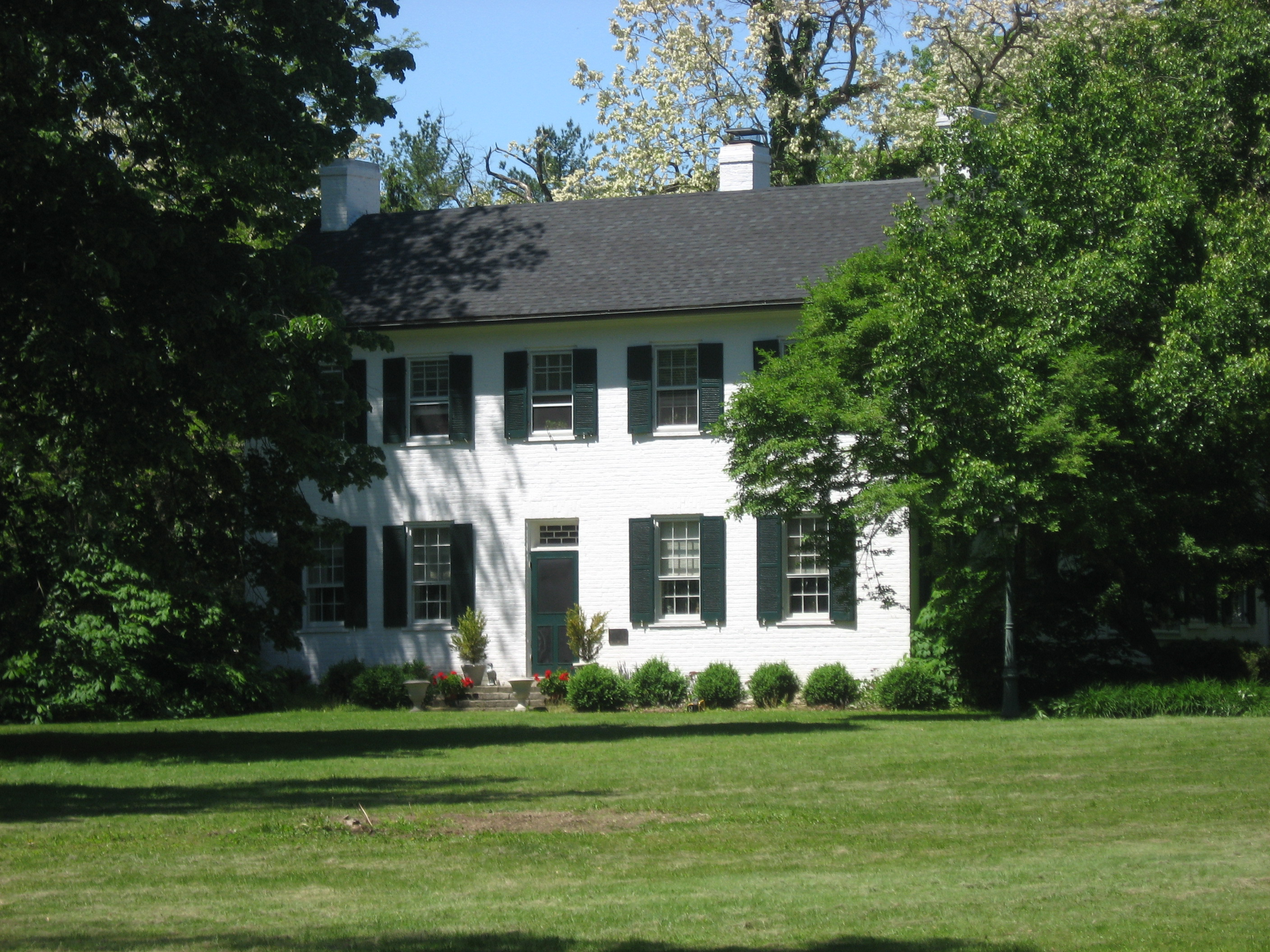
- Front of the house

- Location within Ohio Location within the United States
- Location: 335 College St., Urbana, Ohio
- Coordinates: 40°6′11.7″N 83°45′27″W
- Area: 5 acres (2.0 ha)
- Built: 1820
- NRHP reference No.: 74001409
- Added to NRHP: July 30, 1974

The John Q.A. Ward House is a historic house in Urbana, Ohio, United States. Located along College Street on the city's western side, it was built in 1820 by Colonel William Ward, the founder of Urbana, as a wedding present for his son, John Anderson Ward. John lived in the house until his death in 1855.

John A. Ward's son, John Quincy Adams Ward, is the namesake of the house. A sculptor, Ward was known for multiple carvings of the Marquis de Lafayette, George Washington, and Oliver Hazard Perry.

The Ward House is historically significant for its early architecture. Based on a stone foundation, the brick house is a two-story structure built in an "L" plan. This well-preserved architecture, together with its connection to John Q.A. Ward, led to the house's addition to the National Register of Historic Places in 1974.
