= Central United Methodist Church (Mansfield, Ohio) =

Historic church in Ohio, United States

- U.S. National Register of Historic Places
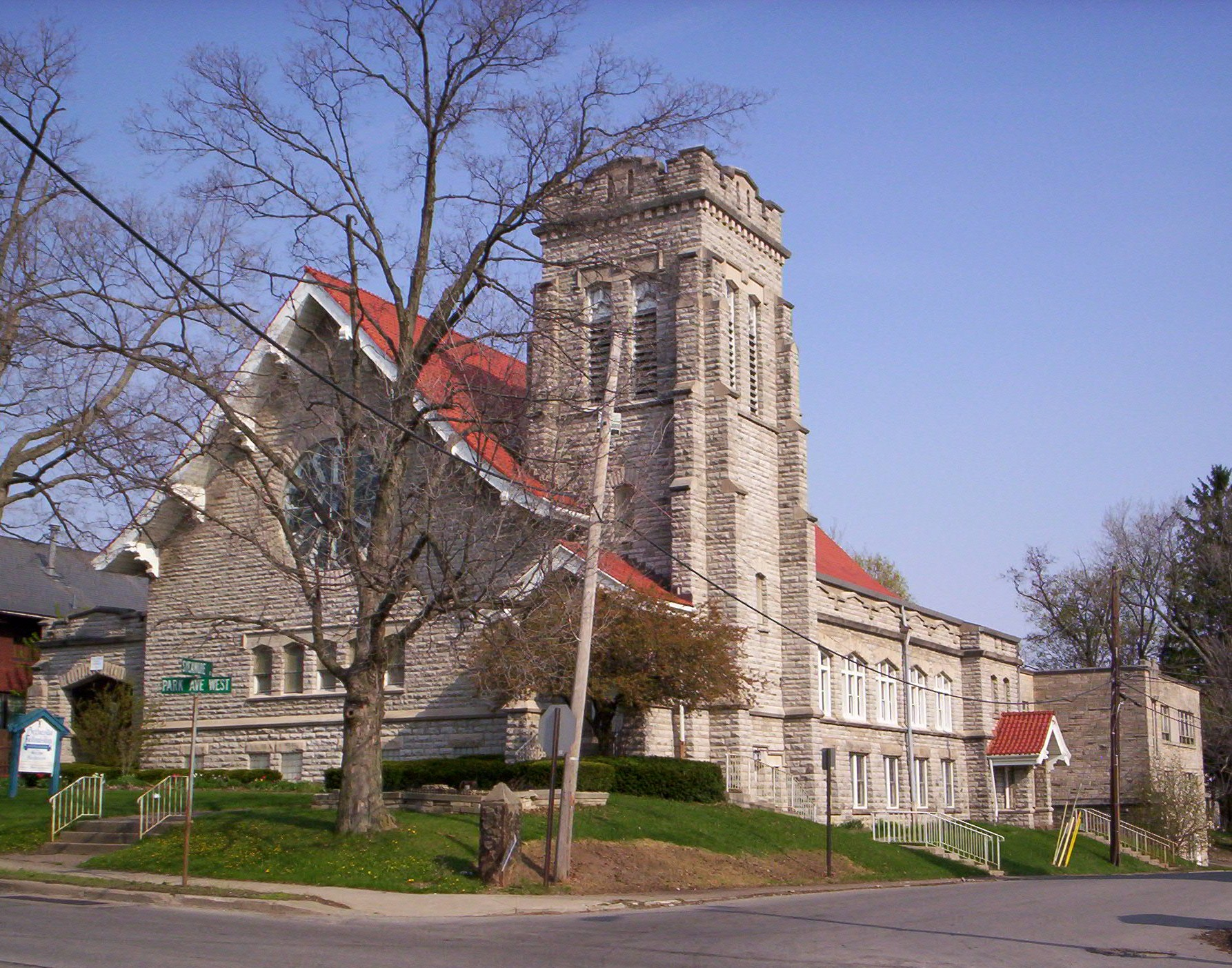

- Location within Ohio Location within the United States
- Location: 378 Park Ave., W., Mansfield, Ohio
- Coordinates: 40°45′33″N 82°31′46″W
- Area: less than one acre
- Built: 1910
- Architectural style: Romanesque, Richardsonian Romanesque
- MPS: Park Avenue West MRA
- NRHP reference No.: 83002027
- Added to NRHP: July 8, 1983

Central United Methodist Church is a historic church in Mansfield, Ohio. It was built in 1910 and added to the National Register of Historic Places in 1983.
