= Mitchell–Ward House (Belvidere, North Carolina) =

Historic house in North Carolina, United States

- U.S. National Register of Historic Places
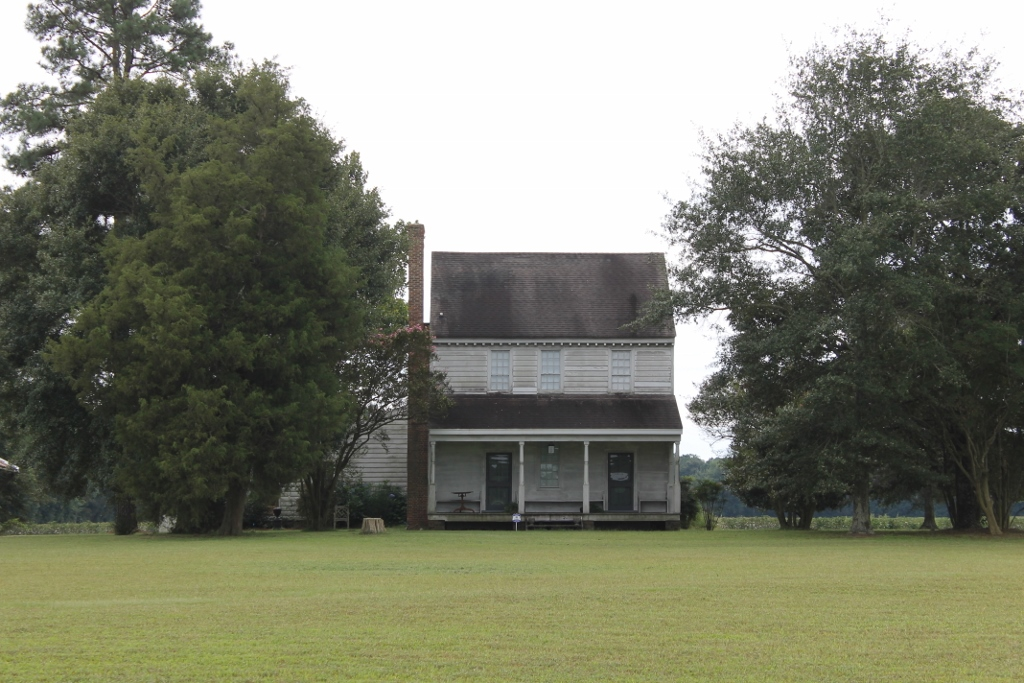

- Location within North Carolina Location within the United States
- Location: Jct. NC 1119 and NC 1002, near Belvidere, North Carolina
- Coordinates: 36°16′30″N 76°34′5″W
- Area: 3 acres (1.2 ha)
- Built: c. 1832
- Architectural style: Federal
- NRHP reference No.: 99000716
- Added to NRHP: June 25, 1999

Mitchell–Ward House, also known as Snow Hill, is a historic farmhouse located near Belvidere, Perquimans County, North Carolina. It was built about 1832, and is a two-story, three-bay, double pile frame dwelling with Federal style design elements. It has a side gable roof, is sheathed in weatherboard, and rests on a brick pier foundation. Also on the property is a detached kitchen (c. 1832).

The house was added to the National Register of Historic Places in 1999.
