= Mitchell–Ward House (Gentry, Arkansas) =

Historic house in Arkansas, United States

- U.S. National Register of Historic Places
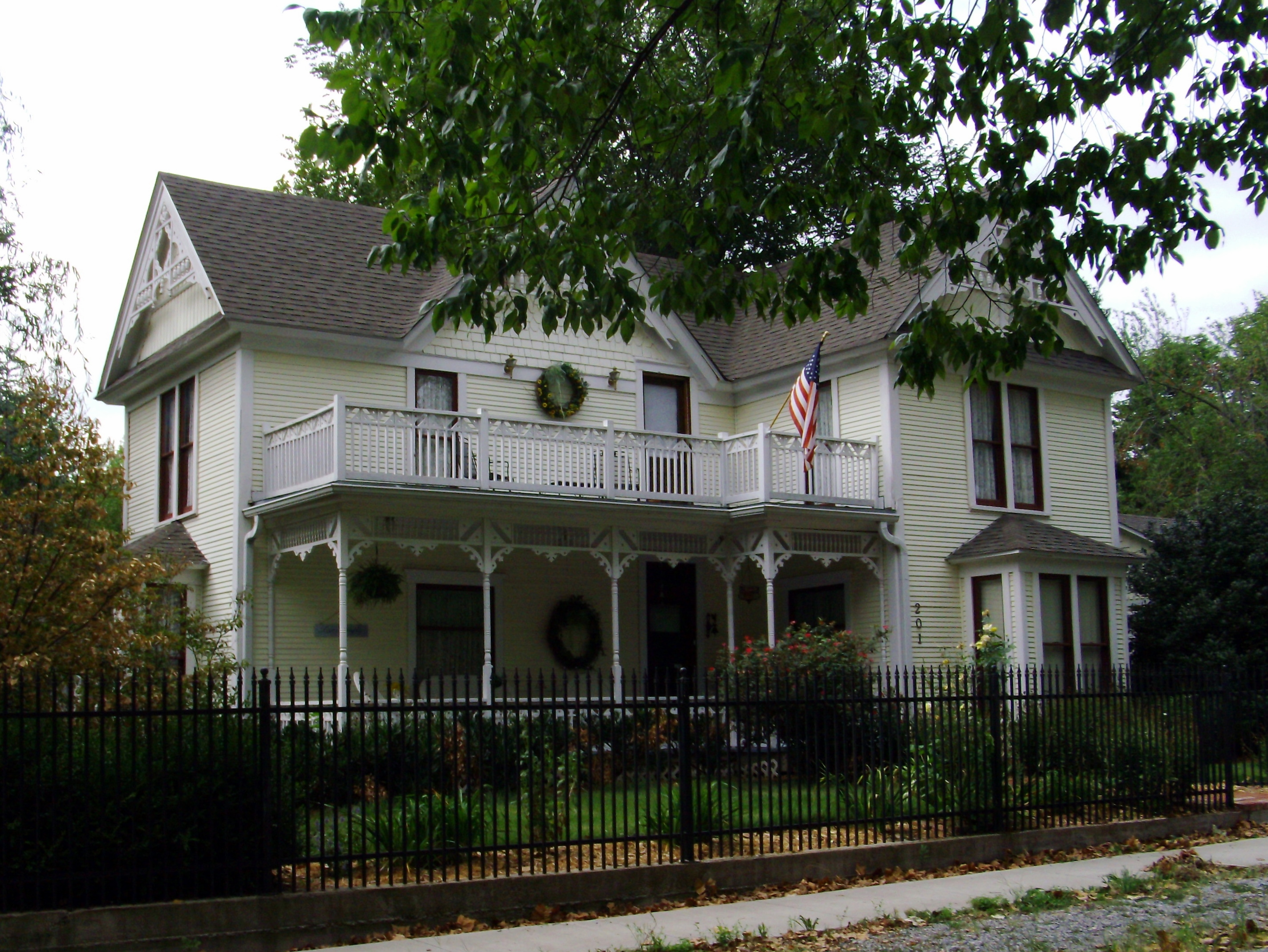

- Location within Arkansas Location within the United States
- Location: 201 N. Nelson, Gentry, Arkansas
- Coordinates: 36°16′16″N 94°29′4″W
- Area: less than one acre
- Built: 1897
- Built by: Robert L. Summers
- Architectural style: Late Victorian
- NRHP reference No.: 05000486
- Added to NRHP: June 1, 2005

The Mitchell–Ward House is a historic house at 201 North Nelson in Gentry, Arkansas. Its main block is an L-shaped wood-frame structure, with a cross-gable roof, and a large gable above the porch in the crook of the L. The three front-facing gable ends have decorative Folk Victorian jigsawn trim and different styles of siding, and the porch features turned posts, a spindled balustrade, and a decorative frieze. The interior has also retained all of its original woodwork. The house was built in 1897, and is one of the finest Queen Anne/Folk Victorian houses in the city.

The house was listed on the National Register of Historic Places in 2005.

== See also ==
- Mitchell House (Gentry, Arkansas)
- National Register of Historic Places listings in Benton County, Arkansas
