= Cardinal Conference (Ohio) =

Defunct high school athletic conference in Ohio, US

- Classification: OHSAA
- Founded: 1960
- Ceased: 1987
- Sports fielded: 13
- No. of teams: 7 (at peak)
- Region: Ohio

The Cardinal Conference was a high school athletic conference in north central Ohio that existed from 1960 to 1987. With its dissolution, several teams joined the Ohio Heartland Conference. In 2003, a new conference, the Ohio Cardinal Conference, was formed with the expressed intention of preserving the legacy of the original Cardinal Conference.

== History ==
Attempts to form the Cardinal Conference began as early as 1949; by 1955, discussions began in earnest and on April 8, 1959, the new conference was officially formed. The conference remained stable throughout the 1960s and 1970s. In 1981, Mansfield Malabar became the first school to leave the conference; in 1983, Coshocton High School followed suit. The remaining conference members discussed adding several schools, including readmitting Malabar, adding Mansfield Senior High School or Mt. Vernon High School, but travel considerations prevented any agreement from being reached.

By the mid-1980s, the conference began to disintegrate. Madison and Ashland left the conference for the newly formed Ohio Heartland Conference. Dover High School joined the Senate League. Wooster and New Philadelphia both joined the Federal League. The Cardinal Conference officially disbanded following the 1986-87 school year.

Over the conference's history, the conference had four separate commissioners. The first commissioner, Don Welsh, was associated with Wooster. Welsh was succeeded by O.J. Thompson, and he by Joe Romano. New Philadelphia's Jim Roman was the final conference commissioner in the 1980s.

== Members ==
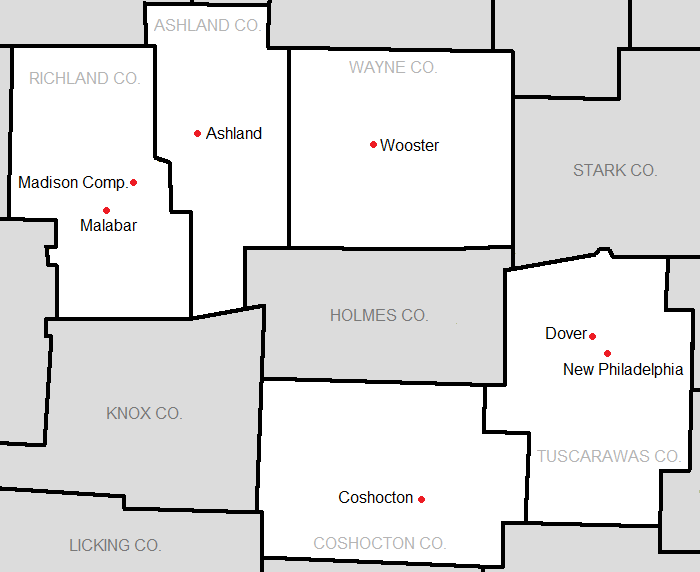

The following schools were members of the Cardinal Conference during its duration.

- Ashland High School (1960-1987)
- Coshocton High School (1961-1983)
- Dover High School (1960-1987)
- Madison High School (1960-1987)
- Malabar High School (1963-1981)
- New Philadelphia High School (1961-1987)
- Wooster High School (1960-1987)

=== Conference rivalries ===
- Wooster vs. Madison
- Dover vs. New Philadelphia

== State championships ==
=== Fall sports ===
This only includes state championships won while schools were members of the Cardinal Conference:

School	Sport	Year(s)
Ashland	Boys' Golf	1962
Coshocton	Boys' Golf	1970 1975
Dover	none	
Madison	none	
Malabar	none	
New Philadelphia	none	
Wooster	Boys' Golf	1980

== Notable athletes ==
- James R. Black, Dover (1980)

== See also ==
- Ohio High School Athletic Conferences
