= Ohio Cardinal Conference =

High school athletic conference from Ohio

The Ohio Cardinal Conference is an Ohio High School Athletic Association athletic league that began competition in 2003 and is made of member schools from Ashland, Holmes, Richland, Tuscarawas, and Wayne counties in Ohio.

== Members ==
Ohio Cardinal Conference
- Classification: OHSAA Divisions I-IV
- Founded: 2003
- Sports fielded: 19
- No. of teams: 8
- Region: Ohio
- Website: OCCSports.org

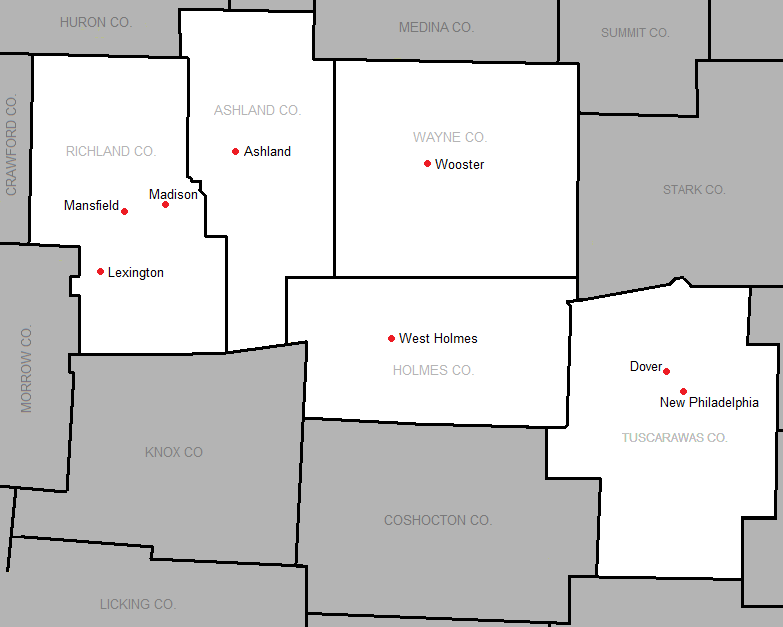
Map of the OCC members beginning with the 2025-2026 school year.

School	Nickname	Location	Colors	Tenure	Notes
Ashland	Arrows	Ashland	Orange, black	2003–	
Dover	Crimson Tornadoes	Dover	Crimson and gray	2025–	
Lexington	Minutemen	Lexington	Purple, gold	2003–	
Madison Comprehensive	Rams	Madison Twp.	Green, white	2003–	
Mansfield	Tygers	Mansfield	Orange, brown	2003–	
New Philadelphia	Quakers	New Philadelphia	Red, black	2022–	
West Holmes	Knights	Millersburg	Blue, red, white	2003–	Leaving for the Principals Athletic Conference in 2028
Wooster	Generals	Wooster	Blue, gold	2003–	

=== Former members ===
School	Nickname	Location	Colors	Tenure	Notes
Clear Fork	Colts	Bellville	Green, black, white	2004–2017	left for Mid-Ohio Athletic Conference
Mount Vernon	Yellow Jackets	Mount Vernon	Orange, black	2016–2024	left for Licking County League
Orrville	Red Riders	Orrville	Red, White, black	2003–2016	left for Principals Athletic Conference

== History ==
The Ohio Cardinal Conference derives its name from the historic Cardinal Conference, a former league that included New Philadelphia, Dover, Coshocton, Ashland, Wooster, Mansfield Malabar, and Mansfield Madison.

In 2001, athletic directors from several area schools met in Mansfield, Ohio, to discuss the creation of a new athletic conference. Seven schools agreed to form the Ohio Cardinal Conference (OCC). Five of the founding members—Ashland, Lexington, Mansfield Madison, Mansfield Senior, and Orrville—came from the now-defunct Ohio Heartland Conference. West Holmes joined from the Mohican-Area Conference, while Wooster joined from the Federal League. Clear Fork later became the conference’s first non-original member when it joined for the 2004–05 school year.

The conference experienced some administrative challenges in its early stages. The league’s first commissioner, Jim Glauer, resigned in 2002 before the OCC began official competition. He was replaced by Orrville athletic director Ron Dessecker, who continues to serve as the conference’s commissioner.

Conference membership has evolved over time. West Holmes High School explored leaving the OCC to join the East Central Ohio League, reviving discussions that began in 2007. A departure in 2009–10 would have left the OCC with an odd number of teams, but West Holmes ultimately decided to remain in the conference.

In 2009, Triway High School received an invitation to join the OCC but declined, choosing to remain in the Principals Athletic Conference (PAC-8). Several years later, in March 2015, Orrville accepted an invitation to join the PAC-8 beginning in 2016. To replace Orrville, the OCC extended an invitation to Mount Vernon, which joined the conference that same year.

Further changes occurred in March 2016 when the OCC voted to remove Clear Fork following the 2017–18 school year. Clear Fork subsequently joined the Mid-Ohio Athletic Conference.

The conference expanded again in April 2020 when New Philadelphia was invited to become the OCC’s eighth member beginning with the 2022–23 school year. As part of the agreement, New Philadelphia was permitted to continue its Week 10 football rivalry with Dover, one of the oldest rivalries in Ohio high school football.

Additional realignment occurred in December 2022 when Mount Vernon announced it would leave the OCC after the 2023–24 school year to join the Licking County League. To maintain conference membership levels, the OCC extended an invitation to Dover High School on December 13, 2023, to join the conference beginning with the 2025–26 school year, with football competition starting in 2026–27. Dover officially accepted the invitation on January 11, 2024.

West Holmes announced in March 2026, that they plan to depart from the OCC beginning the 2028–29 school year, with their intention on joining the Principals Athletic Conference.

=== State championships ===
This table only includes state championships won by schools while a member of the Ohio Cardinal Conference:

School	Sport	Year(s)
Ashland	Boys' Bowling	2025
Clear Fork	Boys' Baseball	2010
Lexington	Girls' Tennis Boys' Tennis Girls' Cross Country Boys' Cross Country	2006, 2007, 2010, 2011, 2012 2004, 2013 2015, 2017, 2018, 2019, 2020 2015, 2017, 2025
Madison	Girls Soccer	2020
Mansfield	none	
Mount Vernon	none	
Orrville	Volleyball	2003
West Holmes	Girls' Basketball	2014
Wooster	none	
