= West Holmes High School =

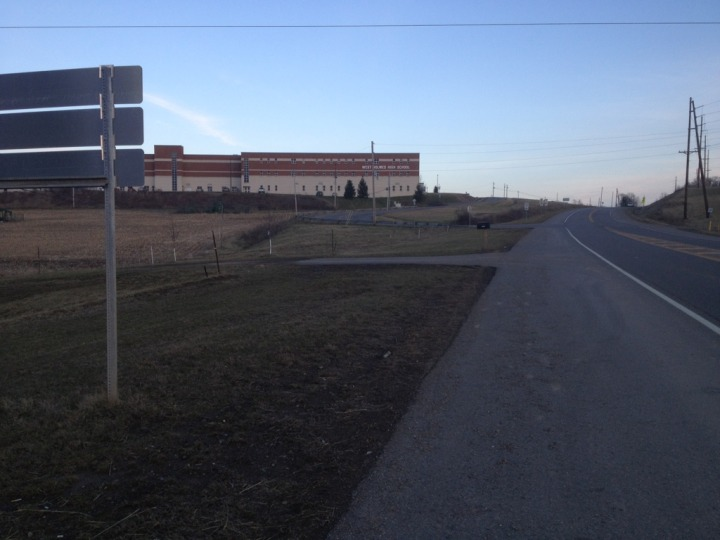

Location
- 10909 State Route 39; Millersburg, Ohio 44654; United States; 40°34′36″N 82°0′59″W

Information
- Type: Public, coeducational
- Established: 1964
- School district: West Holmes Local School District
- Principal: Scott Pringle
- Faculty: 32.00 (FTE)
- Grades: 9–12
- Average class size: 30-35
- Student to teacher ratio: 16.22
- Colors: Red, white, blue
- Athletics conference: Ohio Cardinal Conference
- Mascot: Knight
- Team name: Knights
- Rival: Triway High School; Hiland High School; Wooster High School
- Website: westholmes.org

West Holmes High School is a public high school in Monroe Township, approximately five miles (8.0 km) west of Millersburg, Ohio. It holds grades 9–12. It is one of only two public high schools in Holmes County.

== Curriculum ==
West Holmes High School is one of many public schools in the state of Ohio offering College Credit Plus courses through The University of Akron - Wayne College. West Holmes High School currently offers a variety of CCP courses across all subjects.

== Athletics ==
West Holmes competes in the Ohio High School Athletic Association (OHSAA) as a member of the Ohio Cardinal Conference. West Holmes has three big rivals, Triway High School and Wooster High School in all sports, and Hiland High School in all sports except for football and wrestling as Hiland High School does not participate in contact sports. The West Holmes girls basketball team holds the Ohio state record for consecutive wins with 108, a winning streak that spanned four years from 1983 to 1987 and included three consecutive state championships.

=== State championships ===
- Girls basketball – 1984, 1985, 1986, 2014

== Notable alumni ==
Joe Norman — professional American football linebacker in the National Football League. He played five seasons for the Seattle Seahawks.

Max Rohskopf — professional American mixed martial artist competing in the Ultimate Fighting Championship.
