= WDNP =

WDNP may refer to:

- WDNP-LD, a low-power television station (channel 34, virtual 36) licensed to serve St. Petersburg, Florida, United States
- WDNP-LP, a low-power radio station (102.3 FM) licensed to serve Dover, Ohio, United States
