= Ernie Godfrey =

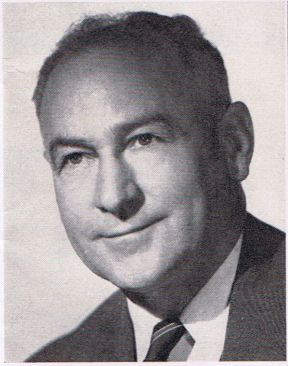
- Godfrey, c. 1958

Biographical details
- Born: April 19, 1892; Dover, Ohio, U.S.
- Died: June 12, 1980 (aged 88); Columbus, Ohio, U.S.

Playing career
- 1912–1914: Ohio State
- Positions: End, center

Coaching career (HC unless noted)

Football
- 1915: Wooster HS (OH)
- 1916: Wittenberg
- 1919–1928: Wittenberg
- 1929–1961: Ohio State (assistant)

Basketball
- 1916–1917: Wittenberg
- 1918–1928: Wittenberg

Head coaching record
- Overall: 63–24–8 (college football); 95–65 (college basketball)

Accomplishments and honors

Championships
- Football; 2 Buckeye (1927–1928)
- College Football Hall of Fame; Inducted in 1972 (profile)

Ernest R. Godfrey (April 19, 1892 – June 12, 1980) was an American football player and coach of football and basketball. Godfrey was inducted into the College Football Hall of Fame as a coach in 1972.

Godfrey was born in Dover, Ohio graduating from Dover High School in 1911. Godfrey played college football at Ohio State from 1912 to 1914.

Godfrey served as head football coach at Wittenberg University for 11 seasons beginning in 1916, interrupted for the next two seasons due to World War I where he served at a 1st Lt in the U.S. Army, returning to coaching in 1919. Over his coaching tenure, Wittenberg achieved a 63–24–8 record, including two league titles in 1927 and 1928. Godfrey also coached the men's basketball team, earning a 95–65 record.

In 1929, he returned to his alma mater, Ohio State University, as an assistant football coach. He served at Ohio State for 33 years under seven head coaches—Sam Willaman, Francis Schmidt, Paul Brown, Carroll Widdoes, Paul Bixler, Wes Fesler, and Woody Hayes. He was the line coach for 19 years, defensive backfield coach for four years, and freshman coach for ten years.

== Head coaching record ==
=== College football ===
Year	Team	Overall	Conference	Standing	Bowl/playoffs
Wittenberg Tigers (Ohio Athletic Conference) (1916)
1916	Wittenberg	2–5–2	0–5–1	12th	
Wittenberg Tigers (Ohio Athletic Conference) (1919–1925)
1919	Wittenberg	6–0–2	3–0–2	5th	
1920	Wittenberg	8–0	5–0	2nd	
1921	Wittenberg	4–3–2	3–3–2	T–9th	
1922	Wittenberg	6–2–1	5–2–1	7th	
1923	Wittenberg	7–1	5–1	3rd	
1924	Wittenberg	7–1	6–1	2nd	
1925	Wittenberg	3–5–1	3–5–1	15th	
Wittenberg Tigers (Ohio Athletic Conference) (1926–1927)
1926	Wittenberg	6–2	4–1 / 3–1	5th / 2nd	
1927	Wittenberg	8–2	4–1 / 4–0	5th / 1st	
Wittenberg Tigers (Buckeye Athletic Association) (1928)
1928	Wittenberg	6–3	4–1	T–1st	
Wittenberg:		63–24–8			
Total:		63–24–8			
National championship Conference title Conference division title or championship game berth
