= Oregon's 18th House district =

Legislative districts in the state of Oregon

Oregon's 18th House district after redistricting after the 2020 Census

District 18 of the Oregon House of Representatives is one of 60 House legislative districts in the state of Oregon. As of 2021, the boundary for the district includes portions of Clackamas and Marion counties. The district includes Aurora, Hubbard, Molalla, Silverton, and Mount Angel. The current representative for the district is Republican Rick Lewis of Silverton.

== Election results ==
District boundaries have changed over time. Therefore, representatives before 2021 may not represent the same constituency as today. General election results from 2000 to present are as follows:

Year	Candidate	Party	Percent	Opponent	Party	Percent	Opponent	Party	Percent	Opponent	Party	Percent	Write-in percentage
2000	Deborah Kafoury	Democratic	81.87%	Barry Joe Stull	Pacific Green	11.70%	Roger Shipman	Constitution	3.33%	Victoria Gillebeau	Socialist	3.10%	
2002 (Note: Tootie Smith was the incumbent in this election. She previously represented District 28, but was moved to this district due to redistricting following the 2000 United States census.)	Tootie Smith	Republican	81.76%	Herman Joseph Baurer	Constitution	17.37%	No third candidate			No fourth candidate			0.87%
2004	Mac Sumner	Republican	55.41%	Jim Gilbert	Democratic	42.90%	Martin Soehrman	Libertarian	1.69%	No fourth candidate			
2006	Mac Sumner	Republican	52.62%	Jim Gilbert	Democratic	44.92%	Roger Shipman	Constitution	2.30%	No fourth candidate			0.16%
2008 (Note: Vic Gilliam was the incumbent in this election. He was appointed to this seat on December 28, 2007 to replace Mac Sumner, who resigned from office.)	Vic Gilliam	Republican	55.94%	Jim Gilbert	Democratic	43.87%	No third candidate			No fourth candidate			0.18%
2010	Vic Gilliam	Republican	63.46%	Rodney Orr	Democratic	34.17%	Martin Soehrman	Libertarian	2.13%	No fourth candidate			0.25%
2012	Vic Gilliam	Republican	96.39%	Unopposed									3.61%
2014	Vic Gilliam	Republican	65.63%	Scott Mills	Democratic	33.84%	No third candidate			No fourth candidate			0.53%
2016	Vic Gilliam	Republican	64.74%	Tom Kane	Democratic	32.17%	Patrick Marnell	Libertarian	2.81%	No fourth candidate			0.28%
2018 (Note: Rick Lewis was the incumbent in this election. He was appointed to this seat on February 22, 2017 to replace Vic Gilliam, who resigned from office.)	Rick Lewis	Republican	65.94%	Barry Shapiro	Democratic	33.86%	No third candidate			No fourth candidate			0.20%
2020	Rick Lewis	Republican	70.20%	Jamie Morrison	Democratic	29.53%	No third candidate			No fourth candidate			0.27%
2022	Rick Lewis	Republican	71.09%	Jesse S. Smith	Democratic	28.79%	No third candidate			No fourth candidate			0.12%
2024	Rick Lewis	Republican	70.8%	Karyssa Dow	Democratic	29.0%	No third candidate			No fourth candidate			0.2%

== See also ==
- Oregon Legislative Assembly
- Oregon House of Representatives
