= Mansfield City School District =

School district in Ohio

Coordinates: 40°45′17″N 82°31′22″W

Location
- P.O. Box 1448, Mansfield, OH 44901 Mansfield, Ohio United States

District information
- Type: Public
- Grades: PK-12
- Superintendent: Stan Jefferson, June 2019

Students and staff
- Students: 4,591

Other information
- Website: www.tygerpride.com

Mansfield City School District is a public school district serving students in the city of Mansfield, and northwestern parts of Madison Township in Richland County, Ohio, United States. The school district enrolls 4,591 students as of the 2012–2013 academic year.

== Schools ==
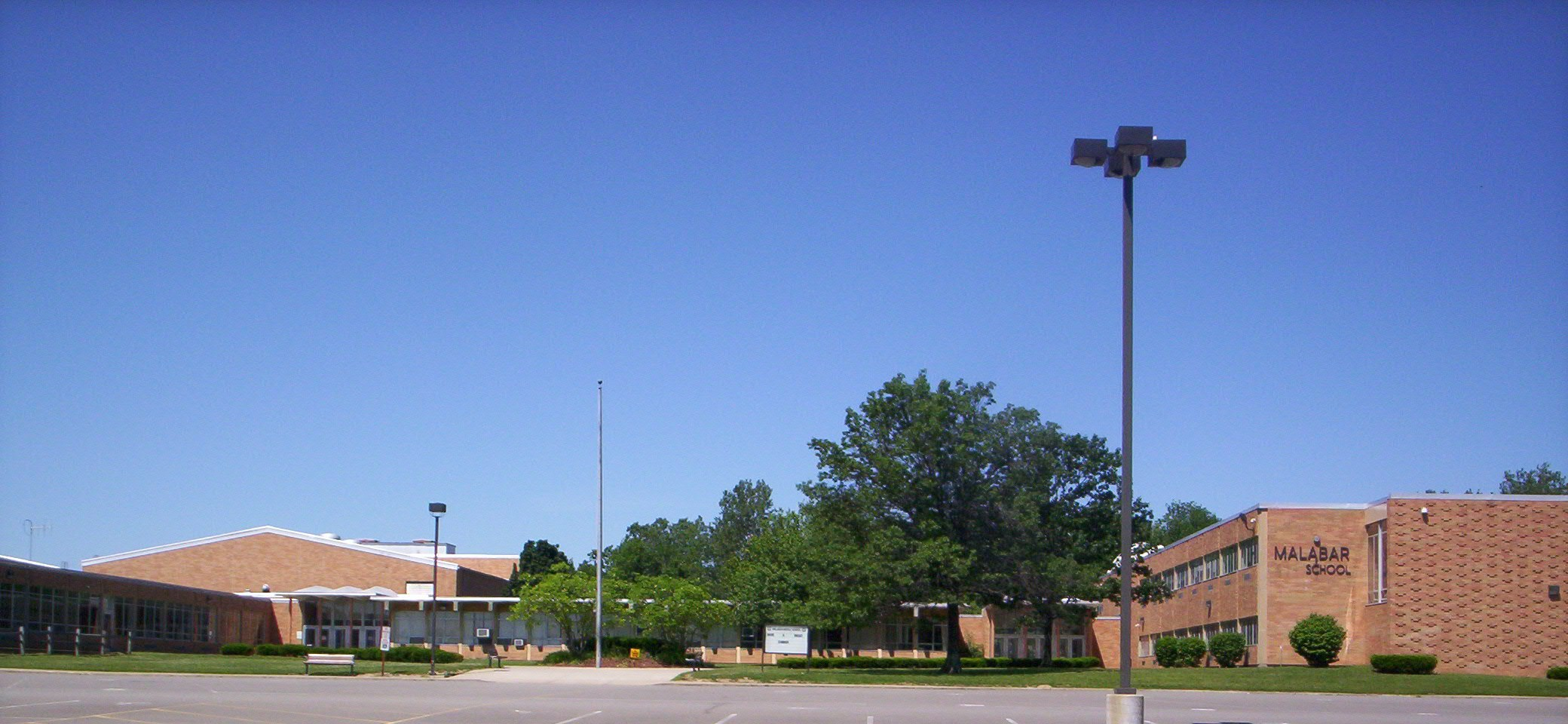
Malabar Intermediate School, was Malabar High School from the time the school was built until 1989, became Malabar Middle School from 1989 to 2010.

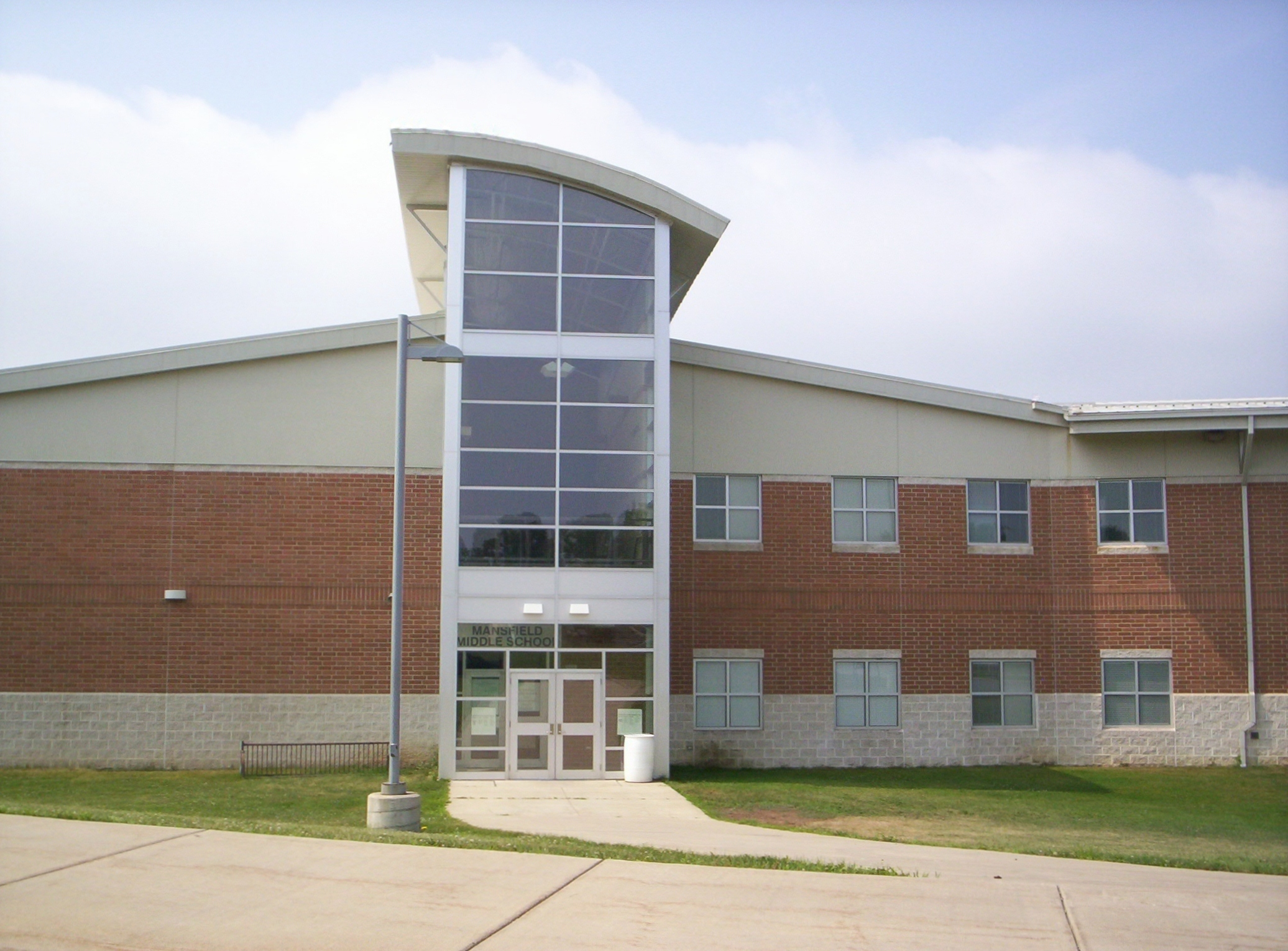
Mansfield Middle School, located in the north wing of Mansfield Senior High School.

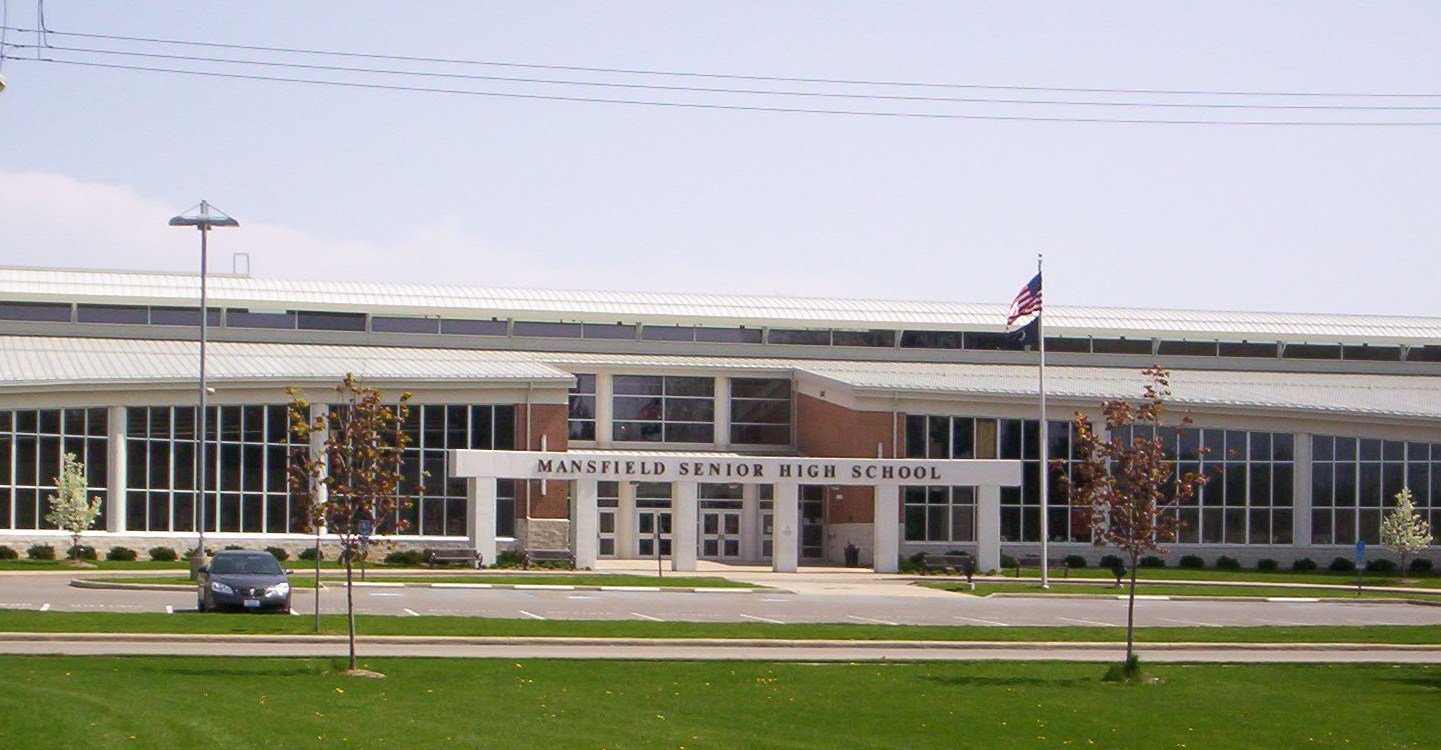
Mansfield Senior High School

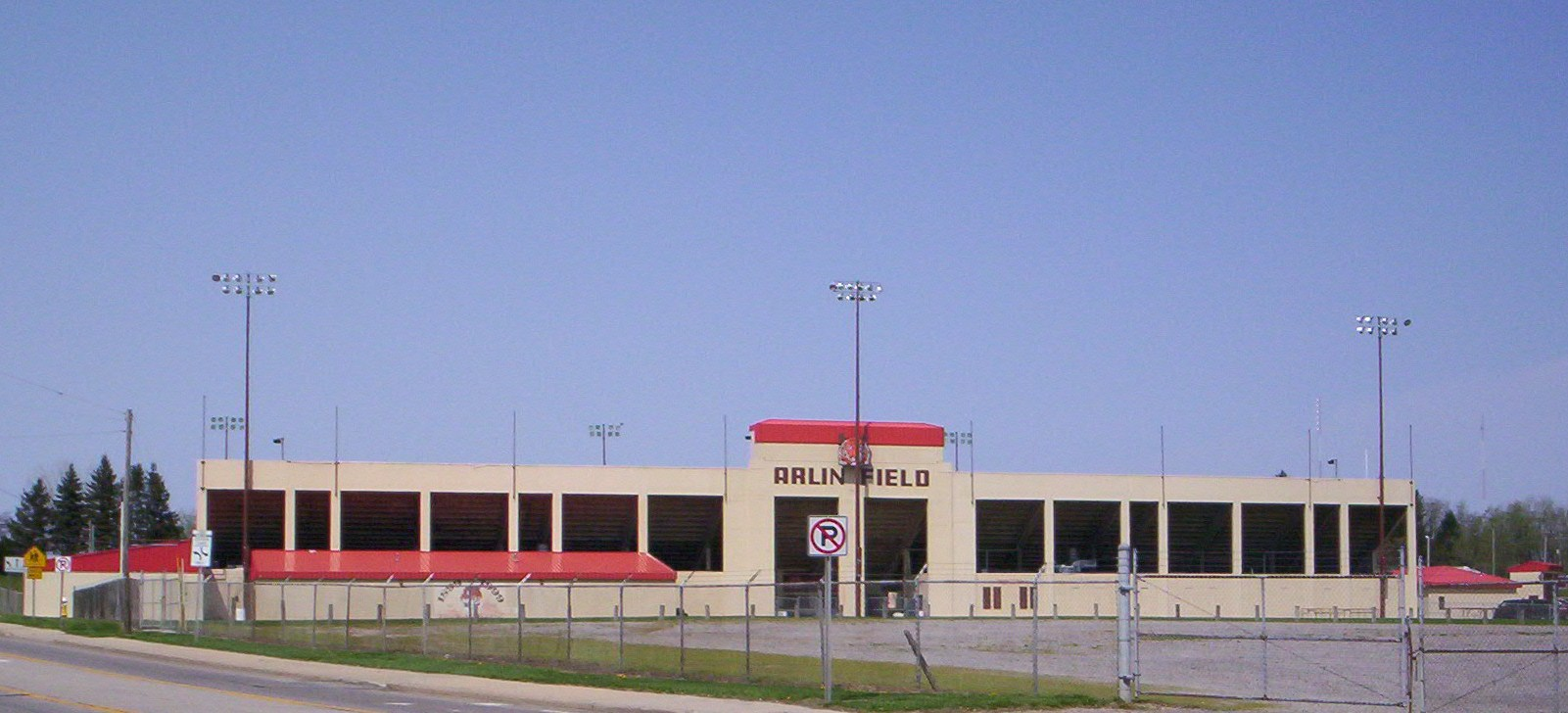
Arlin Field (Mansfield Tygers' Stadium)

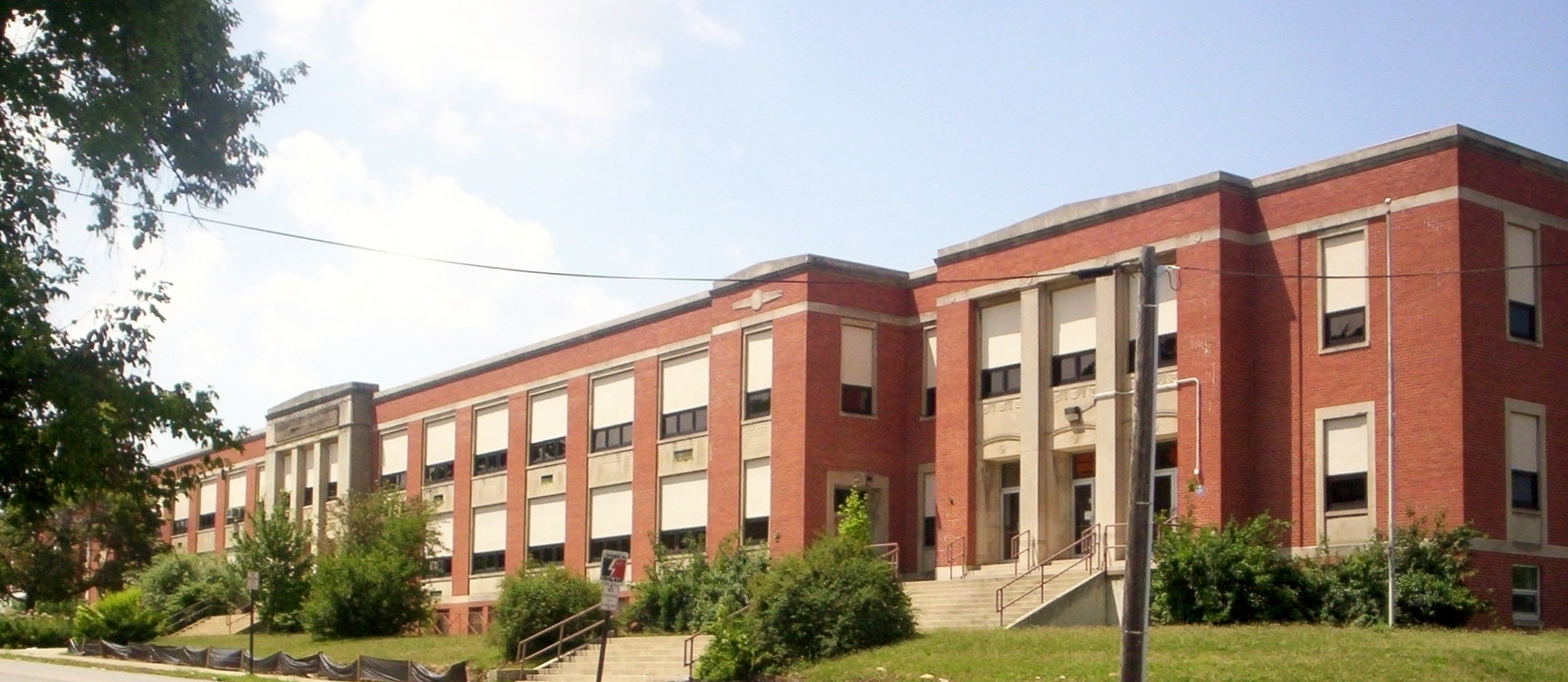
Former John Simpson Middle School

=== Elementary schools ===
- John Sherman Elementary School (Grades K through 2nd)
- Spanish Immersion School (Grades K through 8th)
- Springmill STEM Elementary School (Grades K-3)

=== Intermediate schools ===
- Malabar Intermediate School (Grades 4th through 6th)

=== Middle schools ===
- Mansfield Middle School (Grades 7th and 8th)

=== High schools ===
- Mansfield Senior High School (Grades 9th through 12th)
- Alternative School (Grades 1st through 2nd

=== Former schools ===
- Appleseed Middle School (288 Cline Avenue) – built in 1940, closed in 1989 and converted into Cline Avenue Campus of Mansfield Senior for ninth-graders, who were housed there from 1989 to 2003. In 2004, the old school building that once housed Appleseed Middle School and Cline Avenue Campus of Mansfield Senior was demolished.
- Brinkerhoff Elementary School (218 Marion Avenue) – built in 1884, closed in 1949, demolished in 1979
- Brinkerhoff Elementary School (240 Euclid Avenue) – was converted to Brinkerhoff Intermediate School in 2007 and in 2010 was converted to Spanish Immersion Elementary School. Spanish Immersion was then moved to the Woodland Building on Davis Road.
- Carpenter Elementary School (335 Marion Avenue) – built in 1950, closed in 2007 (now houses OhioHealth MedCentral Agencies)
- Creveling School (455 Bowman Street) – built in 1950, closed in 1978 (now houses the Mansfield Elective Academy)
- Empire Elementary School (395 Pomerene Road) – built in 1956, closed in 1989 and was demolished in 2009
- Flemming Falls School (452 Annadale Avenue) – built in 1956, closed in 1989 and was demolished in 2021
- Hedges Elementary School (176 Hedges Street) – built in 1911, 1950 and 1956, was converted to Hedges Intermediate School in 2007, closed in 2010 (now houses the Learns Academy)
- Malabar High School (205 West Cook Road) – was converted into Malabar Middle School in 1989 and in 2010 was converted into Malabar Intermediate School
- Mansfield High School (218 West Fourth Street) – built in 1892 as Mansfield's first high school located at 218 West Fourth Street (West Fourth at Bowman Street) and relocated in 1927 when a new high school on West Park Boulevard was completed. The old high school was demolished in 1939 to make way for the new John Simpson Middle School.
- Mansfield Senior High School (109 West Park Boulevard) – built in 1927, demolished in July 2004 after a new Mansfield Senior High School at 124 North Linden Road was completed. The new and current Mansfield Senior High School opened at the beginning of the 2004–05 school year.
- Newman Elementary School (457 Central Avenue) – built in 1947, closed in 2014
- Prospect Elementary School (485 Gilbert Avenue) – closed in 2022 and was demolished in July 2023
- Raemelton School (South Trimble Road at Marion Avenue) – demolished in 2005
- Raemelton Elementary School (856 West Cook Road) – closed in 1978 (now houses the district central office)
- Ranchwood Elementary School (1033 Larchwood Road) – built in 1956, closed in 2007 (now houses The Silver Lining Group)
- Rebecca Grubaugh School (87 Western Avenue) – built in 1911 as Western Avenue School. The school was renamed Rebecca Grubaugh School in 1948 and closed in 1978. (now houses Western Avenue Apartments)
- Roseland Elementary School (777 North Trimble Road) – built in 1947, closed in 1989 (now houses the Foundation Academy of Mansfield)
- John Sherman Middle School (1138 Springmill Street) – converted into John Sherman Elementary School in 1989
- John Simpson Middle School (218 West Fourth Street) – built in 1939, closed in 2007. John Simpson Middle School was demolished late March, early April 2014.
- Springmill Elementary School (1200 Nestor Drive) – built in 1961, was converted to Springmill Intermediate School in 2007, closed in 2010 (now houses the Science Center)
- Stadium Elementary School (165 North Trimble Road) – built in 1957, closed in 1989 (now houses STAR School)
- West Fifth Elementary School (150 West Fifth Street) – built in 1948, closed in 1989

== Consolidation ==
From the 1960s until 1989, Mansfield had two high schools, Senior High and Malabar, as well as three middle schools, Simpson, Sherman and Appleseed. Due to budgetary considerations, in fall 1989 Malabar was converted into a middle school, with all high school students being centralized at Senior High, with the exception of the ninth-graders, who were housed in the former Appleseed Middle School, dubbed the Cline Avenue Campus. Sherman became an elementary school, and several elementary schools were closed down, among them West Fifth and Stadium. Rae Melton Elementary, on the south side, had been closed and converted to administrative offices a decade earlier. From the 1990s until 2007, Mansfield had one high school, Senior High, two middle schools, Malabar and Simpson housing sixth through eighth graders, as well as nine elementary schools housing K through fifth graders. In fall 2003, the Cline Avenue Campus would close for good, relocating all ninth-graders to Senior High and in fall 2004, the new Mansfield Senior High School opens. Due to budgetary considerations once again, in fall 2007 John Simpson Middle School, as well as two elementary schools, Carpenter and Ranchwood were closed down for good leaving only one middle school, Malabar housing only seventh and eighth graders, and seven elementary schools, turning three of them, Brinkerhoff, Hedges and Springmill into intermediate schools housing fourth through sixth graders. In 2010, the district consolidated further. Seventh and eighth graders were moved from Malabar Middle School to their own wing in Mansfield Senior High School. All of the fourth through sixth grade students were moved to the Malabar school, now called Malabar Intermediate School. Hedges and Springmill Intermediate Schools were closed. Brinkerhoff Intermediate School was converted to the Spanish Immersion School. The central office personnel was moved from Mansfield Senior High School to the former Raemelton School.

== Notable alumni ==
- Wilbur "Pete" Henry, member college football hall of fame, Washington & Jefferson College 1915–1919, inaugural member NFL Hall Of Fame(1920–1926 Canton Bulldogs, 1927 New York Giants, 1927–1928

Pottsville Maroons)

- Sherrod Brown, US Senator (D) Ohio
- Hugh Douglas, retired NFL player (1995 Defensive Rookie of the year with the Jets, two stints with the Eagles, Jaguars)

The students of the popular WhatsApp group "The Clerb"
