= Wilbur Fox =

American basketball player

Wilbur "Web" Fox
Personal information
- Born: January 19, 1919 Dover, Ohio
- Died: January 26, 1991 (aged 72) Massillon, Ohio
- Listed height: 6 ft 5 in (1.96 m)
- Listed weight: 185 lb (84 kg)

Career information
- High school: Dover (Dover, Ohio)
- Position: Forward / center

Career history
- 1938–1940: Akron Goodyear Wingfoots

Wilbur Owen Fox (January 19, 1919 – January 26, 1991) was an American professional basketball player. He played in the National Basketball League for the Akron Goodyear Wingfoots and averaged 1.0 points per game for his career.
