= Cornerstone Elementary School =

Cornerstone Elementary School may refer to:

- Cornerstone School at Pedregal in Rancho Palos Verdes, California - Palos Verdes Peninsula Unified School District
- Cornerstone Montessori Elementary School in Saint Paul, Minnesota
- Cornerstone Elementary School in Dexter, Michigan - Dexter Community Schools
- Norton Cornerstone Elementary School (closed) in Norton, Ohio - Norton City Schools
- Cornerstone Elementary School in Wooster, Ohio - Wooster City Schools
- Cornerstone Elementary School in Sugar Land, Texas - Fort Bend Independent School District
