= Mac Sumner =

American politician

Macon Ernest "Mac" Sumner Jr.

Member of the Oregon House of Representatives from the 18th district
- In office January 2005 – December 8, 2006
- Preceded by: Tootie Smith
- Succeeded by: Vic Gilliam

Mayor of Molalla
- In office 2001–2002

Personal details
- Born: March 7, 1940 Sedalia, Missouri, U.S.
- Died: May 7, 2007 (aged 67) Molalla, Oregon, U.S.
- Party: Republican

Military service
- Allegiance: United States
- Branch/service: United States Air Force

Macon Ernest "Mac" Sumner Jr. (March 27, 1940 – May 7, 2007) was an American politician who served in the Oregon House of Representatives from 2005 until 2006.

== Early life ==
Sumner was born in Sedalia, Missouri in 1940 and moved to Oregon at the age of seven. He graduated from Benson Polytechnic High School. He was in the United States Air Force as a jet engine mechanic. He served in Japan and was discharged April 30, 1963.

== Career ==
Sumner was appointed to the Molalla, Oregon City Council in October 1997 and elected in 1998, and served as mayor of the city from 2001 until 2002. He remained on the city council until the spring of 2004, when he resigned to run for the House. Sumner won in the crowded Republican primary and was elected, defeating Democrat Jim Gilbert. He was reelected in 2006, easily winning the primary and then the general election, once again defeating Gilbert.

Sumner was diagnosed with lung cancer in September 2006, and resigned on December 8. He was succeeded by Vic Gilliam, a part-time actor, educator, and political aide.

Sumner died on May 7, 2007, at the age of 67. Upon his death, Sumner was praised by then-Governor Ted Kulongoski.

== Personal life ==
Sumner and his wife, Sandy, had seven children.

== Electoral history ==
2004 Oregon State Representative, 18th district
Party	Candidate	Votes	%
Republican	Mac Sumner	14,605	55.6
Democratic	Jim Gilbert	11,058	42.1
Libertarian	W. Martin Soehrman	518	2.0
Write-in		69	0.3
Total votes		26,250	100%

2006 Oregon State Representative, 18th district
Party	Candidate	Votes	%
Republican	Mac Sumner	11,526	52.6
Democratic	Jim Gilbert	9,840	44.9
Constitution	Roger Shipman	504	2.3
Write-in		34	0.2
Total votes		21,904	100%
