= Perci Garner =

American baseball player (born 1988)

- Relief pitcher
- Born: December 13, 1988 (age 37); Dover, Ohio, U.S.
- Batted: Right Threw: Right

MLB debut
- August 31, 2016, for the Cleveland Indians

Last MLB appearance
- September 27, 2016, for the Cleveland Indians

MLB statistics
- Win–loss record: 0–0
- Earned run average: 4.82
- Strikeouts: 12
- Stats at Baseball Reference

Teams
- Cleveland Indians (2016)

Percival Garner III (born December 13, 1988) is an American former professional baseball pitcher. He played in Major League Baseball (MLB) for the Cleveland Indians in 2016.

== College career ==
Perci was a three-sport athlete while attending Dover High School in Dover, Ohio, where he played basketball, football, and baseball. He enrolled at Ball State University to play college football, but only saw two snaps at quarterback in his redshirt freshman season. At the urging of football coach Stan Parrish, Perci tried out for the college baseball team. Garner played two seasons for Ball State. As a redshirt freshman, Perci had a 4.95 ERA across 20 innings in 17 games. The following year, Perci led the team in strikeouts (83) while compiling a 4.62 ERA and a 5-3 record as a starter, earning him First Team All-Mid-American Conference honors.

== Professional career ==
=== Philadelphia Phillies ===
Garner was drafted by the Philadelphia Phillies in the second round of the 2010 Major League Baseball draft. He spent 2010 and 2011 with the Williamsport Crosscutters, and played sparingly. In 2012, Garner was promoted to the Clearwater Threshers, where he had a 7-9 record and a 4.84 ERA in 26 starts. He followed that up with a 6-6 record and a 4.30 ERA in 22 starts for Clearwater, while also having shorts stints with the Reading Fightin Phils and the Lehigh Valley IronPigs. He then split time between Clearwater and Reading in 2014 before being released.

=== Cleveland Indians ===
On April 14, 2015, Garner signed a minor league contract with the Cleveland Indians, who converted him from a starting pitcher to a relief pitcher. During the 2015 season, Perci pitched solely for the Lynchburg Hillcats posting a record of 3-1 with a 2.93 ERA in 18 appearances. In 2016, Garner compiled a combined 7-1 record and 1.83 ERA in a total of 41 appearances with the Akron RubberDucks and the Columbus Clippers before making his major league debut in August.

Garner was called up to the major leagues by Cleveland for the first time on August 31, 2016, and made his debut that same day. During his time with the Indians in 2016, he appeared in 8 games, compiling a 4.82 ERA with 12 strikeouts across 9 1/3 innings pitched.

On July 31, 2017, Garner was designated for assignment by the Indians, in order to make room on their 40-man roster for Joe Smith. The Indians released Garner on August 3, and re-signed him to a minor league contract on August 5. In 13 games split between Akron and Columbus, he struggled to a 6.89 ERA with 20 strikeouts across 15 2/3 innings pitched. Garner elected free agency following the season on November 6.

=== Baltimore Orioles ===
On November 30, 2017, Garner signed a minor league contract with the Baltimore Orioles organization. He was released without making an appearance for the organization on June 6, 2018.

== After baseball ==
Since his career ended he has started a podcast available on Youtube, Spotify, and his personal website https://www.percigarner.com/ called 99MPH.

On December 3, 2020, Garner became the executive director of the Rainbow Connection, an organization that provides assistance to those needing help with medical bills or expenses. On December 28, 2023, Garner was selected as a councilman at-large for the Dover Democratic Committee.
