= Dover City Schools =

School district in Ohio

Location
- Dover, Ohio; United States
- Coordinates: 40.52387°N 81.48223°W

Other information
- Website: www.dovertornadoes.com

Dover City Schools is a school district in Dover, Tuscarawas County, Ohio, United States.

== Schools ==
- Dover High School
- Dover Middle School
- Dover Avenue Elementary School
- Dover East Elementary School
- Dover South Elementary School

== See also ==
- East Central Ohio ESC
