= Madison Local School District (Richland County, Ohio) =

School district in Ohio

Coordinates: 40°46′44″N 82°29′31″W

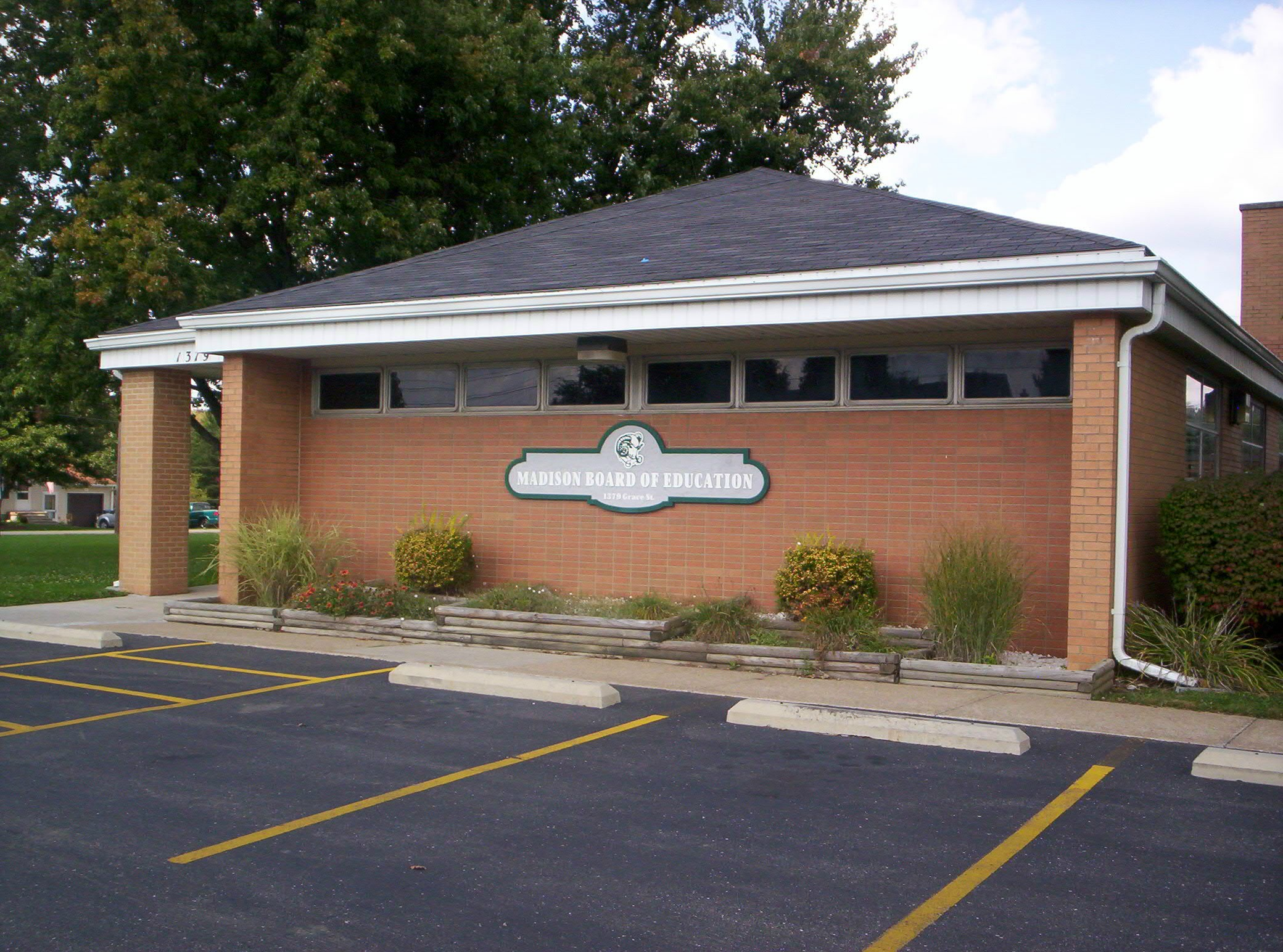
Madison Board of Education building

Madison Local School District is a public school district that serves students in eastern parts of the city of Mansfield, most of Madison Township and Mifflin Township, and eastern parts of Washington Township in Richland County, Ohio, United States. The school district enrolls 3,218 students as of the 2012–2013 academic year.

== Schools ==
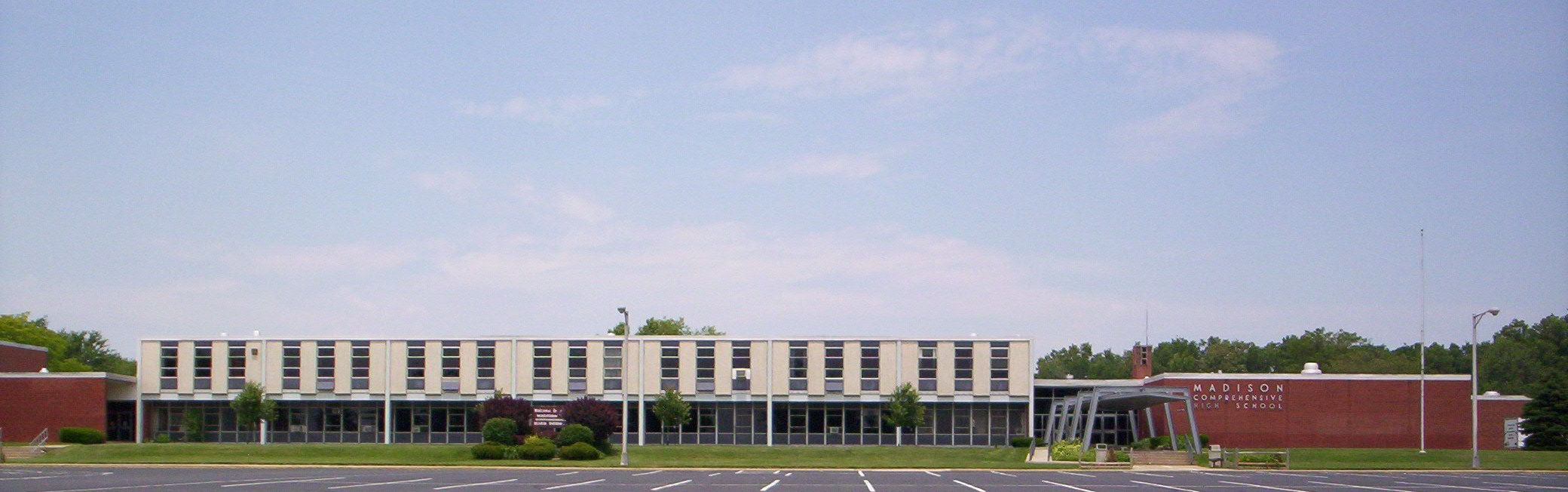
Madison Comprehensive High School

=== Elementary schools ===
- Madison Secondary School (Grades 3 and 4th)
- Madison Primary Elementary School (Grades pre-K through 2nd)

=== Middle schools ===
- Madison Middle School (Grades 5th through 8th)

=== High schools ===
- Madison Comprehensive High School (Grades 9th through 12th)

=== Career Center ===
- Madison Adult Career Center (formerly Madison Adult Education)

=== Former schools ===
- Jesse Beer Elementary School (103 Bahl Avenue) - built in 1935, was East Mansfield School after the school was built. The school closed for good in spring 1985, and the Madison Early Childhood Learning Center was housed there from 1985 to 2020.
- Lincoln School (1090 Grace Street (Grace Street at Stewart Road)) - was built in 1869 as a one-room school and has had additions in 1886, 1924 and 1927. The school was Lincoln School at first, Wallace School, Pleasant Hill School, Lincoln Heights School and Stewart Road School. The school closed for good on June 6, 1975, and is now totally abandoned and for sale.
- Lincoln Heights Elementary School (1035 Grace Street) - was built between 1948-1949 as a one-story school. The building once housed the Ohio Heartland Headstart. In 2020, the Madison Early Childhood Learning Center moves into the building from the former Jesse Beer Elementary School building where it was housed for 35 years.
- Madison Junior High School (690 Ashland Road) - built in 1925, was Madison High School after the school was built. The school at some point during the early 1960s would become Madison Junior High School after a new high school was built at 600 Esley Lane, known today as Madison Comprehensive High School. The school closed for good in December 2013 after a new junior high school, known today as Madison Middle School at 1419 Grace Street was completed. The old junior high school was demolished in April 2014.
- Wooster Heights Elementary School (1419 Grace Street) - was demolished in July 2011 to make way for the new Madison Middle School. Construction on the new junior high school got under way in September 2011 and was completed in December 2013. The new Madison Middle School opened in January 2014.
- Woodville Elementary School (875 Woodville Road) - built in 1957, closed in 1987 and was demolished in February 2014.
