= Roseland, Ohio =

- Census-designated place
- Location within Ohio Location within the United States
- Coordinates: 40°47′2″N 82°32′54″W
- Country: United States
- State: Ohio
- County: Richland
- Township: Madison

Area
  - Total: 0.65 sq mi (1.69 km^{2})
  - Land: 0.65 sq mi (1.69 km^{2})
  - Water: 0 sq mi (0.00 km^{2})
- Elevation: 1,260 ft (380 m)

Population (2020)
  - Total: 1,495
  - Density: 2,287.0/sq mi (883.01/km^{2})
- Time zone: UTC-5 (Eastern (EST))
  - Summer (DST): UTC-4 (EDT)
- ZIP Code: 44906 (Mansfield)
- Area codes: 419/567
- FIPS code: 39-68490
- GNIS feature ID: 2812837

Roseland is an unincorporated community and census-designated place (CDP) in Richland County, Ohio, United States. It was first listed as a CDP prior to the 2020 census. As of the 2020 census, Roseland had a population of 1,495.

The CDP is in central Richland County, in northwestern Madison Township. It is bordered to the east, south, and part of the west by the city of Mansfield. Ohio State Route 39 (Springmill Road) runs through the CDP, leading southeast into Mansfield and northwest 9 miles (14 km) to Shelby.

== Demographics ==
Historical population
Census	Pop.	Note	%±
2020	1,495		—
U.S. Decennial Census
