= Frank Ellwood =

American football player, coach, and administrator (born 1935)

Biographical details
- Born: April 18, 1935 (age 91); Dover, Ohio, U.S.

Playing career
- 1953–1956: Ohio State
- Positions: Quarterback, end

Coaching career (HC unless noted)
- 1957: Dover HS (OH) (assistant)
- 1958: Ohio State (assistant)
- 1959–1961: Air Force (assistant)
- 1962–1964: Ohio State (assistant)
- 1965–1974: Ohio (assistant)
- 1975–1978: Marshall
- 1996: Georgia Southern

Administrative career (AD unless noted)
- 1990–1995: Georgia Southern (sr. assoc. AD)
- 1995: Georgia Southern (interim AD)
- 1996–1998: Georgia Southern (sr. assoc. AD)

Head coaching record
- Overall: 14–41

Frank Ellwood (born April 18, 1935) is an American former football player, coach, and college athletic administrator. He served as the head football coach at Marshall University from 1975 to 1978 and at Georgia Southern University in 1996, compiling a record of 14–41 in five seasons. He was previously an assistant coach at the Ohio State University and at Ohio University. He won a national championship as a player at Ohio State in 1954. Ellwood served as a senior associate athletic director at Georgia Southern from 1990 until his retirement in 1998. He was the school's interim athletic director from July 25 to December 31, 1995.

== Head coaching record ==
Year	Team	Overall	Conference	Standing	Bowl/playoffs
Marshall Thundering Herd (NCAA Division I independent) (1975–1976)
1975	Marshall	2–9			
1976	Marshall	4–7			
Marshall Thundering Herd (Southern Conference) (1977–1978)
1977	Marshall	2–9	0–5	7th	
1978	Marshall	1–10	0–5	7th	
Marshall:		10–34	0–10		
Georgia Southern Eagles (Southern Conference) (1996)
1996	Georgia Southern	4–7	2–6	T–6th	
Georgia Southern:		4–7	2–6		
Total:		14–41			
