= Rick Lewis (politician) =

American politician

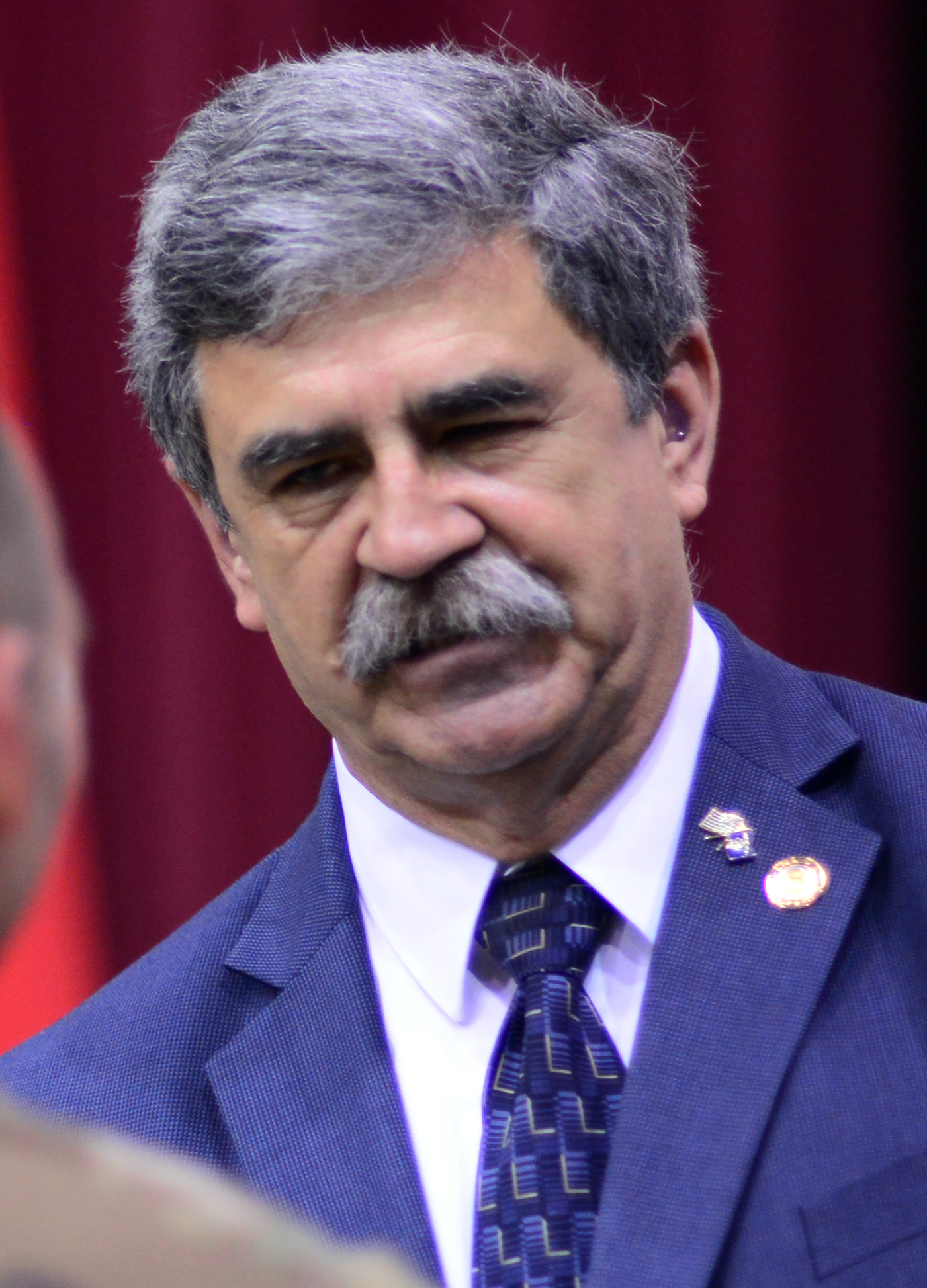

Member of the Oregon House of Representatives from the 18th district
- Incumbent
- Assumed office February 23, 2017
- Preceded by: Vic Gilliam

Mayor of Silverton
- In office January 2015 – February 23, 2017
- Preceded by: Stu Rasmussen
- Succeeded by: Kyle Palmer

Personal details
- Born: Sheridan, Wyoming, U.S.
- Party: Republican
- Education: University of Wyoming
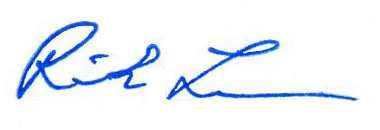
- Signature

Rick Lewis is an American politician and former law enforcement officer serving as a member of the Oregon House of Representatives. He represents the 18th district, which covers southern Clackamas and northeastern Marion counties.

== Early life and education ==
Lewis grew up in Sheridan, Wyoming, and entered the military after graduating from high school upon the advice of his father. Lewis graduated from the University of Wyoming, and served in the Laramie and Gillette police forces.

== Career ==
He moved to Oregon in 1984, serving as a sergeant in the Umatilla police department, and became Union chief of police in 1986. Lewis later served as Bandon chief of police, and as chief of police of Silverton from 1998 until his retirement on August 2, 2012. He was elected mayor of Silverton in 2014, defeating incumbent Stu Rasmussen, and reelected in 2016.

On January 30, 2017, State Representative Vic Gilliam resigned due to deteriorating health. Lewis announced his candidacy for appointment to the vacant seat along with Jerome Rosa and Glenn Holum. On February 22, 2017, Lewis was selected as Gilliam's replacement by the Marion and Clackamas County commissioners. He resigned his position as Mayor and was sworn in on February 23.

== Political positions ==
Following the Standoff at Eagle Pass, Lewis signed a letter in support of Texas Governor Greg Abbott's decision in the conflict.

== Electoral history ==
2018 Oregon State Representative, 18th district
| Party | Candidate | Votes | % |
|---|---|---|---|
| Republican | Rick Lewis | 18,950 | 65.9 |
| Democratic | Barry Shapiro | 9,731 | 33.9 |
| Write-in | | 57 | 0.2 |
| Total votes | | 28,738 | 100% |

2020 Oregon State Representative, 18th district
| Party | Candidate | Votes | % |
|---|---|---|---|
| Republican | Rick Lewis | 25,996 | 70.2 |
| Democratic | Jamie Morrison | 10,933 | 29.5 |
| Write-in | | 100 | 0.3 |
| Total votes | | 37,029 | 100% |

2022 Oregon State Representative, 18th district
| Party | Candidate | Votes | % |
|---|---|---|---|
| Republican | Rick Lewis | 24,352 | 71.1 |
| Democratic | Jesse S Smith | 9,863 | 28.8 |
| Write-in | | 40 | 0.1 |
| Total votes | | 34,255 | 100% |

2024 Oregon State Representative, 18th district
| Party | Candidate | Votes | % |
|---|---|---|---|
| Republican | Rick Lewis | 26,553 | 70.8 |
| Democratic | Karyssa Dow | 10,884 | 29.0 |
| Write-in | | 61 | 0.2 |
| Total votes | | 37,498 | 100% |
