= Vic Gilliam =

American politician and actor (1953–2020)

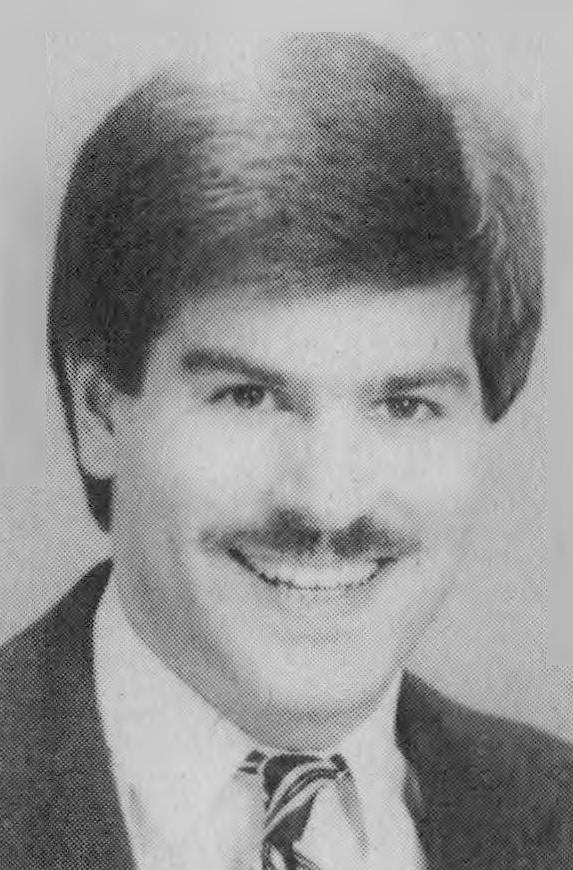
- c. 1986

Member of the Oregon House of Representatives from the 18th district
- In office January 8, 2007 – January 30, 2017
- Preceded by: Mac Sumner
- Succeeded by: Rick Lewis

Personal details
- Born: July 21, 1953 Dover, Ohio, U.S.
- Died: June 17, 2020 (aged 66)
- Party: Republican
- Spouse: Becky
- Children: 2
- Education: Warner Pacific University (BA); University of South Carolina (MEd)

Victor Stephen Gilliam (July 21, 1953 – June 17, 2020) was an American politician and actor who served as a member of the Oregon House of Representatives from 2007 to 2017. A member of the Republican Party, Gilliam resigned in 2017 due to health problems.

After serving as a legislative aide from 1976 to 1981, he unsuccessfully ran for a seat in the Oregon House of Representatives. In 2007, he was appointed to fill the vacancy created by Mac Sumner's resignation and served until his own resignation in 2017. Gilliam was also an actor who appeared in multiple television shows.

== Early life and education ==
Gilliam was born on July 21, 1953, in Dover, Ohio. In 1975, he graduated from Warner Pacific University with a Bachelor of Arts degree. He then earned a Master of Education from the University of South Carolina in 1982. On May 14, 2016, he was awarded an honorary Doctor of Law degree.

== Career ==
From 1976 to 1981, Gilliam worked as a legislative aide to United States Senator Mark Hatfield. In 1980, he criticized President Jimmy Carter's support for military registration of people aged 19 and 20 as "a quick fix, a reaction, a hysterical voice saying that something has to be done." Gilliam was an actor and a member of the Screen Actors Guild. From 1984 to 1985, he served as the director of alumni relations at Willamette University.

=== Oregon House of Representatives ===
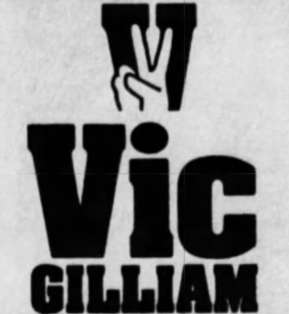
Vic Gilliam's 1986 state house campaign logo

==== Elections ====
During the 1986 elections, Gilliam ran for the Republican nomination for the Oregon House of Representatives from the 31st district. During the campaign, he was endorsed by the Statesman Journal editorial board. He was defeated in the Republican primary by Al Riebel.

In 1987, Gilliam announced that he would seek the Republican nomination in the 31st district, but was defeated by Gene Derfler.

In 2006, State Representative Mac Sumner announced his resignation due to his lung cancer. On December 27, Gilliam was selected to replace Sumner as representative from the 18th district by the county commissioners of Marion and Clackamas counties.

==== Tenure ====
On January 8, 2007, Gilliam was sworn into the Oregon House of Representatives and was appointed to serve on the consumer protection, and the human services and women's wellness committee during the 2007–2009 legislative session.

In 2007, Gilliam voted against legislation that would allow domestic partnerships for same-sex couples, and legislation that would prohibit discrimination against LGBT people in housing, employment, and access to public places. In 2013, he was one of five Republicans in the House of Representatives to vote in favor of allowing illegal immigrants to receive driver licenses.

== Death ==
In 2014, Gilliam and Brian Clem participated in the Ice Bucket Challenge to raise donations for research into amyotrophic lateral sclerosis. In November 2015, he was diagnosed with amyotrophic lateral sclerosis. On January 30, 2017, Gilliam resigned from the House of Representatives due to the symptoms of the disease worsening. Gilliam died on June 17, 2020, aged 66.

== Filmography ==
Title	Year	Role	Notes	Ref.
Nowhere Man	1996	Good-looking cop		
Leverage	2010	Baseball team owner		
Follow the Prophet	2009		Film	
Portlandia	2016		Episode: "Going Gray"	

== Electoral history ==
While Gilliam ran as a Republican during his tenure in the Oregon Assembly, he received the nomination of the Democratic Party in 2012 and the nomination of the Independent Party of Oregon in 2016.

Vic Gilliam electoral history

2008 Oregon State Representative, 18th district election
Primary election
Party	Candidate	Votes	%
Republican	Vic Gilliam (incumbent)	5,141	99.1
Write-in		47	0.9
Total votes		5,188	100%
General election
Republican	Vic Gilliam (incumbent)	14,921	55.9
Democratic	Jim Gilbert	11,702	43.9
Write-in		49	0.2
Total votes		26,672	100%
Republican hold			

2010 Oregon State Representative, 18th district election
Primary election
Party	Candidate	Votes	%
Republican	Vic Gilliam (incumbent)	4,827	98.9
Write-in		52	1.1
Total votes		4,879	100%
General election
Republican	Vic Gilliam (incumbent)	14,558	63.2
Democratic	Rodney E. Orr	7,919	34.4
Libertarian	Martin Soehrman	489	2.1
Write-in		58	0.3
Total votes		23,024	100%
Republican hold			

2012 Oregon State Representative, 18th district Democratic primary
Party	Candidate	Votes	%
Democratic	Vic Gilliam (incumbent) (write-in)	180	45.1
Write-in		219	54.9
Total votes		399	100%

2012 Oregon State Representative, 18th district Republican primary
Party	Candidate	Votes	%
Republican	Vic Gilliam (incumbent)	4,322	99.2
Write-in		34	0.8
Total votes		4,356	100%

2012 Oregon State Representative, 18th district election
Party	Candidate	Votes	%
Republican	Vic Gilliam (incumbent)	20,824	96.4
Write-in		779	3.6
Total votes		21,603	100%
Republican hold			

2014 Oregon State Representative, 18th district election
Primary election
Party	Candidate	Votes	%
Republican	Vic Gilliam (incumbent)	3,574	58.4
Republican	David L. Darnell	2,519	41.2
Write-in		19	0.3
Total votes		6,112	100%
General election
Republican	Vic Gilliam (incumbent)	15,129	65.6
Democratic	Scott A Mills	7,801	33.8
Write-in		123	0.5
Total votes		23,053	100%
Republican hold			

2016 Oregon State Representative, 18th district Independent Party of Oregon primary
Party	Candidate	Votes	%
Independent Party	Vic Gilliam (incumbent) (write-in)	95	56.9
Write-in		72	43.1
Total votes		167	100%

2016 Oregon State Representative, 18th district Republican primary
Party	Candidate	Votes	%
Republican	Vic Gilliam (incumbent)	7,001	98.2
Write-in		130	1.8
Total votes		7,131	100%

2016 Oregon State Representative, 18th district election
Party	Candidate	Votes	%
Republican	Vic Gilliam (incumbent)	19,250	64.7
Democratic	Tom Kane	9,565	32.2
Libertarian	Patrick Marnell	836	2.8
Write-in		82	0.3
Total votes		29,733	100%
Republican hold			
