= Malabar High School =

Location
- 205 W Cook Rd; Mansfield, Ohio 44906
- Coordinates: 40.730332°N 82.52122°W

Information
- Type: Public
- Grades: 9-12
- Colors: Orange & Brown
- Athletics conference: Cardinal Conference (1961-1981)
- Nickname: Falcons
- Website: Mansfield City Schools

Malabar High School was a public high school located in Mansfield, Ohio, United States. The school served grades 9-12 and was part of the Mansfield City School District from 1963 to 1989.

Malabar was built to accommodate Mansfield's population boom after World War II and to ease overcrowding at Mansfield Senior High School. The school was named after Malabar Farm, which belonged to writer and Mansfield native Louis Bromfield

At the start of the 1988–89 school year, the school board announced the school's closure due to the district's shrinking enrollment. The last graduating class was in 1989. When Malabar was merged into Mansfield Senior, the latter kept part of the Falcons' legacy alive by adopting their school colors of orange and brown, which replaced the Tygers' previous combination of red and white.

== Notable alumni ==
- Michael L. Gernhardt, 1974, NASA astronaut
- Burton Stahl, 1965, bass player for The Music Explosion.
