= Lincoln Heights, Richland County, Ohio =

Lincoln Heights, Ohio
- Census-designated place
- Location within Ohio Location within the United States
- Coordinates: 40°46′02″N 82°28′46″W
- Country: United States
- State: Ohio
- County: Richland
- Township: Madison

Area
  - Total: 0.53 sq mi (1.38 km^{2})
  - Land: 0.53 sq mi (1.38 km^{2})
  - Water: 0 sq mi (0.00 km^{2})
- Elevation: 1,270 ft (390 m)

Population (2020)
  - Total: 1,039
  - Density: 1,952.8/sq mi (753.98/km^{2})
- Time zone: UTC-5 (Eastern (EST))
  - Summer (DST): UTC-4 (EDT)
- ZIP Code: 44905 (Mansfield)
- Area codes: 419/567
- FIPS code: 39-43764
- GNIS feature ID: 2812838

Lincoln Heights is an unincorporated area and census-designated place (CDP) in Richland County, Ohio, United States. It was first listed as a CDP prior to the 2020 census.

The CDP is in east-central Richland County, in the center of the east part of Madison Township. It is bordered to the west by the city of Mansfield, to the east by unincorporated Wooster Heights and to the southwest by unincorporated East Mansfield. U.S. Route 42 (Ashland Road) forms the northwestern edge of the CDP. Route 42 leads northeast 11 miles (18 km) to Ashland and southwest 2 miles (3 km) to the center of Mansfield. Ohio State Route 430 (Wooster Road; former U.S. Route 30) forms the southern edge of the CDP; it leads west into Mansfield and east 30 miles (48 km) to Wooster. State Route 39 (Lucas Road) leads southeast from Lincoln Heights 14 miles (23 km) to Perrysville.

== Demographics ==
Historical population
Census	Pop.	Note	%±
2020	1,039		—
U.S. Decennial Census
