= Monty Hunter =

American football player (born 1959)

No. 34
- Position: Safety

Personal information
- Born: January 21, 1959 (age 67); Dover, Ohio, U.S.
- Listed height: 6 ft 0 in (1.83 m)
- Listed weight: 202 lb (92 kg)

Career information
- High school: Dover
- College: Salem
- NFL draft: 1982: 4th round, 109th overall pick

Career history
- Dallas Cowboys (1982); St. Louis Cardinals (1983); Washington Redskins (1984)*
- * Offseason or practice squad member only

Awards and highlights
- All-WVIAC (1981); Second-team All-WVIAC (1980)

Career NFL statistics
- Fumble recoveries: 1
- Sacks: 1
- Stats at Pro Football Reference

Orie Montgomery Hunter III (born January 21, 1959) is an American former professional football player who was a safety in the National Football League (NFL) for the Dallas Cowboys and St. Louis Cardinals (NFL). He played college football for the Salem Tigers.

== Early life ==
Hunter attended Dover High School, where he played as a running back and safety After graduation, he chose to work at the Great Plains Bag Company instead of going to college.

He walked on at NAIA Salem College, where he was a three-year starter at cornerback. As a freshman, he recorded 5 interceptions, although he only played a total of 5 snaps.

As a junior, he had 7 interceptions. He registered 76 tackles (second on the team), 5 interceptions and returned a kickoff for a 93 yards touchdown as a senior.

== Professional career ==
=== Dallas Cowboys ===
Hunter was selected by the Dallas Cowboys in the fourth round (109th overall) of the 1982 NFL draft. He made the team as a backup safety, taking advantage of the retirements of Charlie Waters and Randy Hughes.

Because of his size, he was used as a linebacker on passing downs to cover running backs and tight ends. He is best remembered for the interception he returned for a touchdown in the first round of the playoffs against the Tampa Bay Buccaneers, that turned the game around for a 30–17 win. During the regular season, he also caused a fumble against the Buccaneers, that helped preserve a 14-9 win.

On August 27, 1983, he was waived after being passed on the depth chart by undrafted free agent Bill Bates.

=== St. Louis Cardinals ===
On August 30, 1983, he was claimed off waivers by the St. Louis Cardinals. He played in five games before being cut on October 2, to make room for cornerback Jeff Griffin.

=== Washington Redskins ===
On March 1, 1984, he was signed as a free agent by the Washington Redskins. He was released on July 31.
