= New Philadelphia High School =

Location
- 343 Ray Avenue; New Philadelphia, (Tuscarawas County), Ohio 44663; United States

Information
- School district: New Philadelphia City Schools
- Principal: Ryan Range
- Staff: 48.00 (FTE)
- Grades: 9–12
- Enrollment: 741 (2023-2024)
- Student to teacher ratio: 15.44
- Colors: Red and black
- Athletics conference: Ohio Cardinal Conference
- Mascot: The Fighting Quakers
- Yearbook: Delphian
- Website: nphs.npschools.org

New Philadelphia High School is a public high school in New Philadelphia, Ohio, United States. Founded in 1913 as Central High School, New Philadelphia High School is accredited by the North Central Association of Colleges and Secondary Schools and the Ohio Department of Education. Athletic teams compete as the New Philadelphia Quakers in the Ohio High School Athletic Association as a member of the Ohio Cardinal Conference.

== Academics ==
The Quakers' graduation rate is 90.6% for four years. 71% of the teachers at New Philadelphia high school have a master's degree. 12 Advanced Placement (AP) courses are offered at the high school.

== Athletics ==
=== Rivalry ===
New Philadelphia and the neighboring town of Dover have maintained a competitive rivalry, but in 1968, the two schools considered merging. This idea was introduced as a way for the school district to save money, but the rivalry was already so deep rooted that when the cities voted on the idea, it was immediately shut down.

=== State championships ===
- Boys basketball – 1940
- Boys track and field - 2026

== Extracurriculars ==
In addition to sports, New Philadelphia High School students may participate in a student council, elective clubs (Academic Challenge Team, Drama Club, Science Club, Spanish Club, French Club, Art Club, Mock Trial, and Key Club), cheerleading and The QT's (New Philadelphia's Competitive Dance Team).

The school offers five choir groups: Bel Canto, Concert Choir, Select Men's Chorus, Ladies Ensemble, and the Delphian Chorale. New Philadelphia also has a band program which branches off into seven programs: Competitive Marching Band, Symphonic band (all band students), Concert Band (Freshmen and Sophomores), Wind Ensemble (Juniors and Seniors), Steel Drum Band, Kaleidoscope (Indoor Colorguard), and Jazz Band. The Marching Band competes at Ohio Music Education Association (OMEA) Local, Regional, and Grand National Championships under Bands of America (BOA).

== Notable incidents ==
A tornado in 1964 destroyed the press box, fence, and refreshment stand at the stadium. It cost about $10,165 to repair the damage.

In 1968 two teachers, Mrs. Goforth and Mr. Campbell, were fired. The next day the boys' vocational department organized a walk out of all junior and senior high school students to support them. Despite the show of support, the Board of Education did not reconsider the terminations.

On March 4, 1990, arson caused estimated damages of $6 million to New Philadelphia High School. The fire was started in the second floor library, but also caused significant damage to the third floor room above the library and other adjacent second floor rooms. Investigators found multiple gasoline had ignited piles of books in the library that served as origin points. Firefighters said that the fire was estimated to be burning for about two hours in the enclosed library before being discovered around 6:49 am by a custodian. The police captain confirmed that there had been a break-in at the school. The arson remains an unsolved case. The temperature was estimated to be 2,000 degrees, which caused most of the damage. The doors were closed, which kept the heat in and caused the third floor to sag into the library. In the wake of the fire, high school classes were cancelled for at least a week, until the school decided where the rest of the year was going to be held. The high school students attended the Tuscarawas Campus of Kent State University and Buckeye Vocational School. The junior high school students attended local churches.

== Notable faculty and staff ==
- Woody Hayes came to New Philadelphia in 1936 and started out as an assistant coach to head coach Brickles. He then became a head coach at New Philadelphia in 1938 and led the Quakers to a 9–1 season. For the six-year period that he coached, the Quakers went 54–5–1. The Quakers would outscore their opponents 341 to 52 during the time he was coach. Hayes only remained head coach for three years and then enlisted in the Navy in July 1941. The high school named the football stadium Woody Hayes Quaker Stadium in his honor.

== Notable alumni ==
- Bill "Cannonball" Cooper, professional football player, San Francisco 49ers
- Cie Grant, professional football player, New Orleans Saints
