= Dover High School (Ohio) =

Location
- 520 N Walnut St; Dover, Ohio 44622; United States; 40.523472°N 81.48°W

Information
- Established: 1915; 111 years ago
- Superintendent: Karie McCrate
- CEEB code: 361975
- Principal: Brooke Grafe
- Teaching staff: 40.50 (FTE)
- Grades: 9–12
- Enrollment: 847 (2023–2024)
- Student to teacher ratio: 20.91
- Colors: Crimson and Gray and White
- Song: DHS Alma Mater
- Fight song: Dover High Victory March Crimson Tornado
- Athletics conference: Ohio Cardinal Conference
- Team name: Crimson Tornadoes
- Rival: New Philadelphia Quakers
- Newspaper: Crimsonian
- Website: https://www.dovertornadoes.com/highschool_home.aspx

Dover High School is a public high school in Dover, Ohio, United States, and is the only secondary school in the Dover City School District. Athletic teams compete as the Dover Crimson Tornadoes in the Ohio High School Athletic Association as a member of the Ohio Cardinal Conference.

== History ==
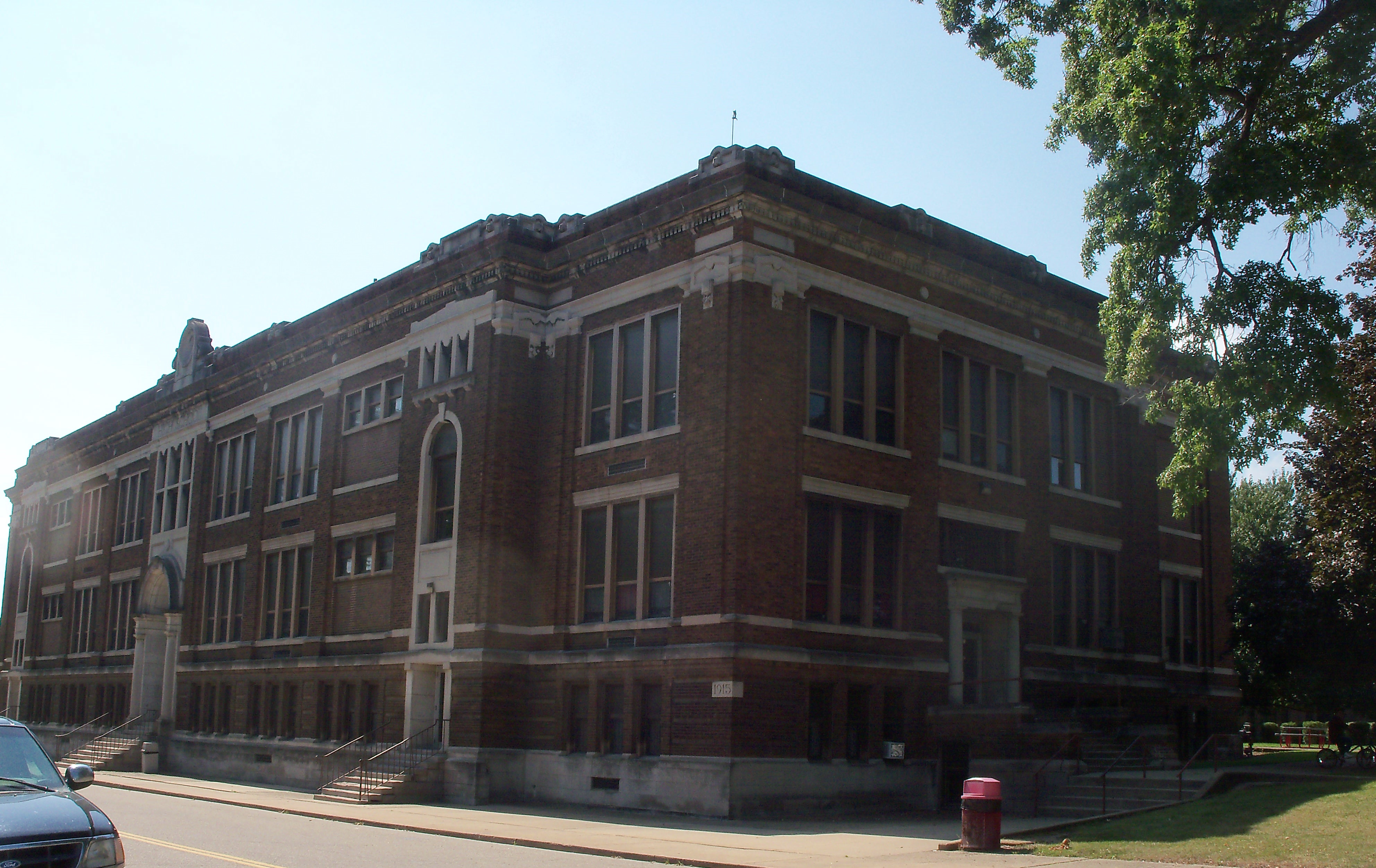
1915 Dover High School building

Dover's first school house was constructed in 1827 in a forested area on the south side of 4th Street, near the cemetery. There was a separate segregated school on W. Front Street until 1917, at which time Dover's school system became fully integrated. The DHS Alma Mater was composed by L. H. Alexander.

On May 17, 2018, the city of Dover broke ground for a new $46.2 million school building. The new facility will be built on the site of the current high school on N. Walnut Street. The oldest portions of the school will be demolished, including the 1915 wing and the 1940 section. A time capsule from 1915 contained in the old school cornerstone was recovered in 2019 and preserved for the new building.

== Athletics ==
Dover High School has a longstanding football rivalry with nearby New Philadelphia High School, having played 120 times since 1896. Dover fields eighteen varsity teams in the Ohio Valley Athletic Conference.

=== Ohio High School Athletic Association State Championships ===
- Boys Basketball – 1927, 1933
- Girls Track and Field – 1995
- Girls Golf – 2014
- Softball – 2025
- OASSA Cheerleading Game Day 2025

== Notable alumni ==
- Hunter Armstrong, gold medal winner in swimming at the 2020 and 2024 Summer Olympics
- James R. Black, American actor and former professional football player
- Paul Blair, ASCA Hall of Fame swimming coach
- Frank Ellwood, collegiate football coach
- Wilbur Fox, professional basketball player
- Perci Garner, professional baseball player
- Ernie Godfrey, collegiate football coach
- Monty Hunter, professional football player
- Frank "Doc" Kelker, collegiate All-American football player
- Jennifer Lahmers, news anchor/TV personality/co-host of “Extra” with Billy Bush
- Al Landis, Ohio state senator
- Ray Mears, collegiate basketball coach, University of Tennessee (1962–77)
- Elliott Nugent, Broadway actor, playwright, film director and writer
- Chris Penso, Major League Soccer referee
- Bob Peterson, director, screenwriter, animator, and voice actor for Pixar. Co-directed the Academy Award-inning movie "Up" (2009).
- Trevor J. Rees, collegiate football player and coach
- Zack Space, Democratic politician; U.S. House of Representatives, Ohio's 18th District, 2007–11
