= Wooster City School District =

School district in Ohio, United States

Address
- 144 North Market Street Wooster, Ohio, 44691; United States

District information
- Type: Public
- Grades: PreK–12
- NCES District ID: 3910032

Students and staff
- Students: 3,273 (2020–2021)
- Teachers: 176.9 (on an FTE basis)
- Staff: 431.71 (on an FTE basis)
- Student–teacher ratio: 18.5:1

Other information
- Website: www.woostercityschools.org

Wooster City School District is a public school district serving students in the city of Wooster, Ohio, United States. The school district enrolls 3,722 students as of the 2012–2013 academic year.

Since the beginning of the 2012–13 school year, the district operates one preschool, four elementary schools for grades kindergarten through fourth, Edgewood Middle School for grades five through seven, Wooster High School for grades eight through 12, and Boys Village School, an alternative school for boys in grades six through 12.

== Schools ==
=== Elementary schools ===
- Cornerstone Elementary School (K through 4th)
- Kean Elementary School (K through 4th)
- Melrose Elementary School (K through 4th)
- Parkview Elementary School (K through 4th)

=== Middle school ===
- Edgewood Middle School (Grades 5th - 7th)

=== High schools ===
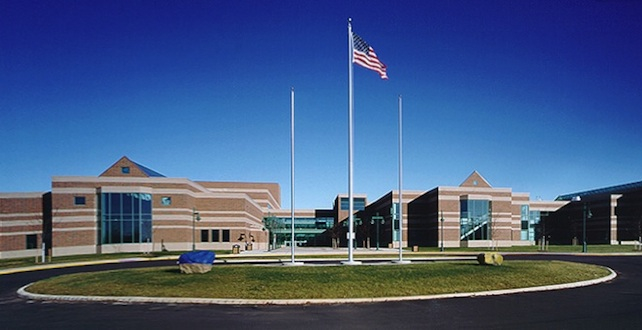
Wooster High School

- Wooster High School (Grades 8th through 12th)
- Boys Village High School (Grades 6th through 12th)

=== Former/Closed ===
- Beall Avenue Elementary (currently the Gault Schoolhouse at the College of Wooster)
- Bowman Street Junior High School (demolished in 1995)
- Grant Street Elementary/Opportunity School
- Layton Elementary (currently leased to Connections Education Services, Inc)
- Lincoln Way Elementary School (closed after 2011/2012 school year)
- Walnut Street Elementary (currently the Wayne Arts Center)
- Wayne Elementary School (closed after 2011/2012 school year)
