= Tootie Smith =

American politician

Clackamas County Commissioner
- In office January 2013 – January 3, 2017
- Preceded by: Jamie Damon
- Succeeded by: Ken Humberston

Member of the Oregon House of Representatives from the 18th district
- In office 2003–2005
- Preceded by: Deborah Kafoury
- Succeeded by: Mac Sumner

Member of the Oregon House of Representatives from the 28th district
- In office 2001–2003
- Preceded by: Roger Beyer
- Succeeded by: Jeff Barker

Personal details
- Born: March 3, 1957 (age 69) Oregon City, Oregon, United States
- Party: Republican
- Education: Concordia University

Tootie Smith (born March 3, 1957) is an American politician and hazelnut farmer from the state of Oregon. A Republican, she served in the state legislature from 2001 until 2005, and on the Clackamas County Board of Commissioners from 2013 until 2017.

In 2019, she announced her candidacy for Clackamas County Chair. She won the election with 64,502 votes (53.22%).

== Biography ==
Smith was born in 1957 in Oregon City. She attended Mount Hood Community College and graduated from Concordia University.

Smith was elected to the Oregon House of Representatives in 2000, and reelected in 2002. In 2012, she was elected to the Clackamas County Board of Commissioners. Smith unsuccessfully ran for the United States House of Representatives in 2014, but lost to incumbent Democrat Kurt Schrader, receiving 39% of the vote. Smith ran for reelection to the county commission in 2016, but lost to Ken Humberston. Smith ran for Clackamas County Chair in 2020 and won. Her term began in January 2021.

In a comment generating controversy, Smith in 2020 said that following her state's COVID restrictions was like being a "second-rate slave".

Smith likely violated open meeting laws in March 2023 by calling for an emergency meeting without notifying citizens or the media.

== Personal life ==
Smith and her husband, Nate, have one child.

== Electoral history ==
2014 US House of Representatives, Oregon's 5th congressional district
Party	Candidate	Votes	%
Democratic	Kurt Schrader	150,944	53.7
Republican	Tootie Smith	110,332	39.3
Independent	Marvin Sannes	7,674	2.7
Constitution	Raymond Baldwin	6,208	2.2
Libertarian	Daniel K Souza	5,198	1.8
Write-in		732	0.3
Total votes		281,088	100%
