= Mansfield Senior High School =

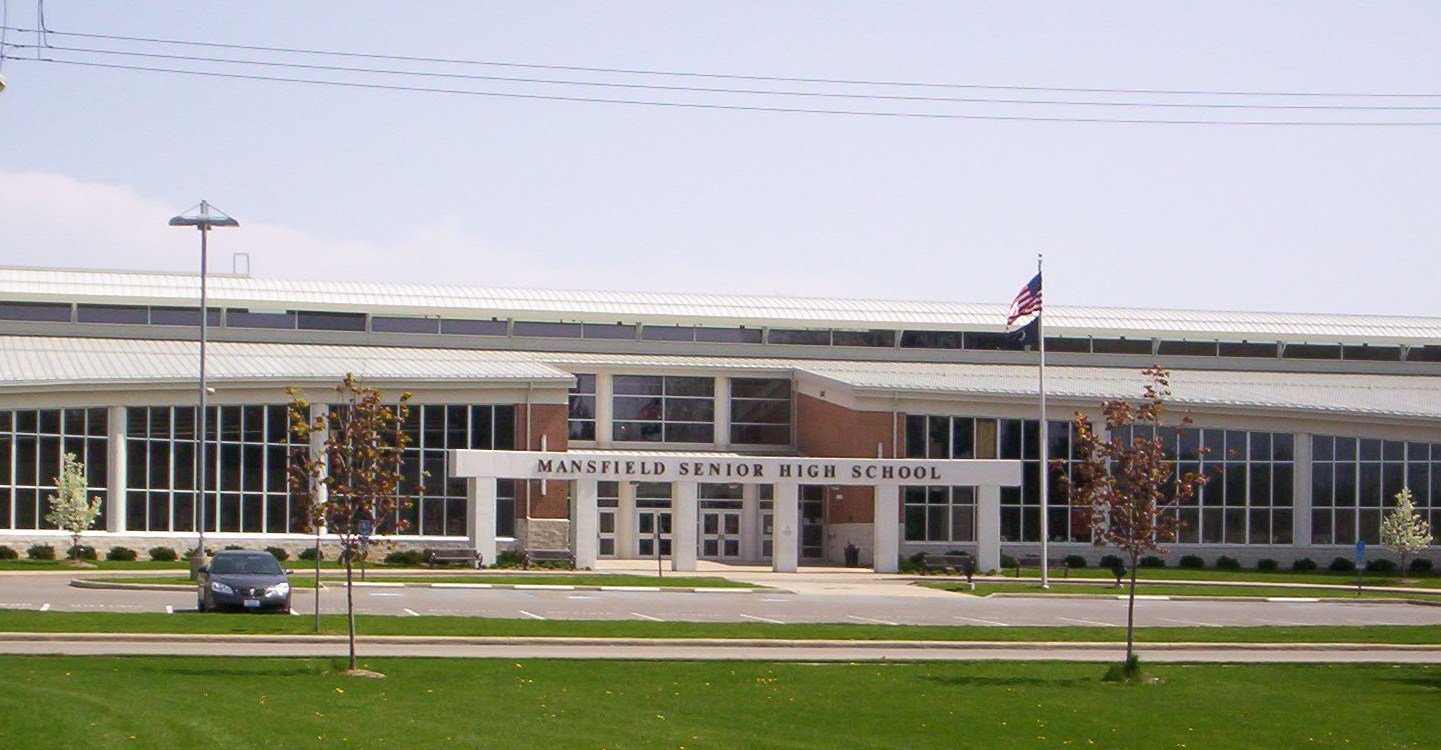

Location
- 124 N Linden Road; Mansfield, Ohio 44903; United States; 40.762222°N 82.543333°W

Information
- Type: Public
- Established: 1927
- Principal: Kris Beasley
- Teaching staff: 68.14 (FTE)
- Grades: 9-12
- Enrollment: 825 (2023–2024)
- Student to teacher ratio: 12.11
- Colors: Orange, Brown, White, Gray, & Black
- Athletics conference: Ohio Cardinal Conference
- Mascot: Tyger
- Website: www.mansfieldschools.org/mansfieldseniorhighschool_home.aspx

Mansfield Senior High School is a public high school located in Mansfield, Ohio. it is the only high school in the Mansfield City School District. Athletic teams are known as the Tygers and they compete as a member of the Ohio High School Athletic Association in the Ohio Cardinal Conference.

== History ==
Opened in 1927, Mansfield Senior High School serves students grades 9-12. The original school building was formerly located at 145 West Park Boulevard in Mansfield.

Malabar High School merged with Mansfield Senior High School following the 1988-89 school year, with the school adopting their school colors of orange and brown, compared to Mansfield's former colors, which was red and white.

In 2004, Mansfield constructed a new high school at their current North Linden Road location.

== Athletics ==
Mansfield's nickname the "Tygers" originates from a 1940s football game vs rival Massillon. The legend claims the loser of the game must change their name, Mansfield lost therefore changing the spelling in their nickname "Tigers" from an "I" to a "y."

=== State Championships ===
- Boys baseball – 1954
- Boys track and field – 1945, 1978

== Notable alumni ==
- Anthony Hanshaw - former professional boxer
- Lee Adams — Tony Award-winning lyricist and member of the Songwriters Hall of Fame
- Sherrod Brown — former U.S. Senator from Ohio
- Hugh Douglas — former professional football player in the National Football League (NFL) and football analyst for the ESPN television network
- Willmer Fowler — former American football halfback for the Buffalo Bills
- Keon Johnson — professional basketball player
- John Robinson — former chief justice of the Washington Supreme Court
- Harold Edwin Umbarger — former bacteriologist, biochemist, and member of the National Academy of Sciences
