= Madison Comprehensive High School =

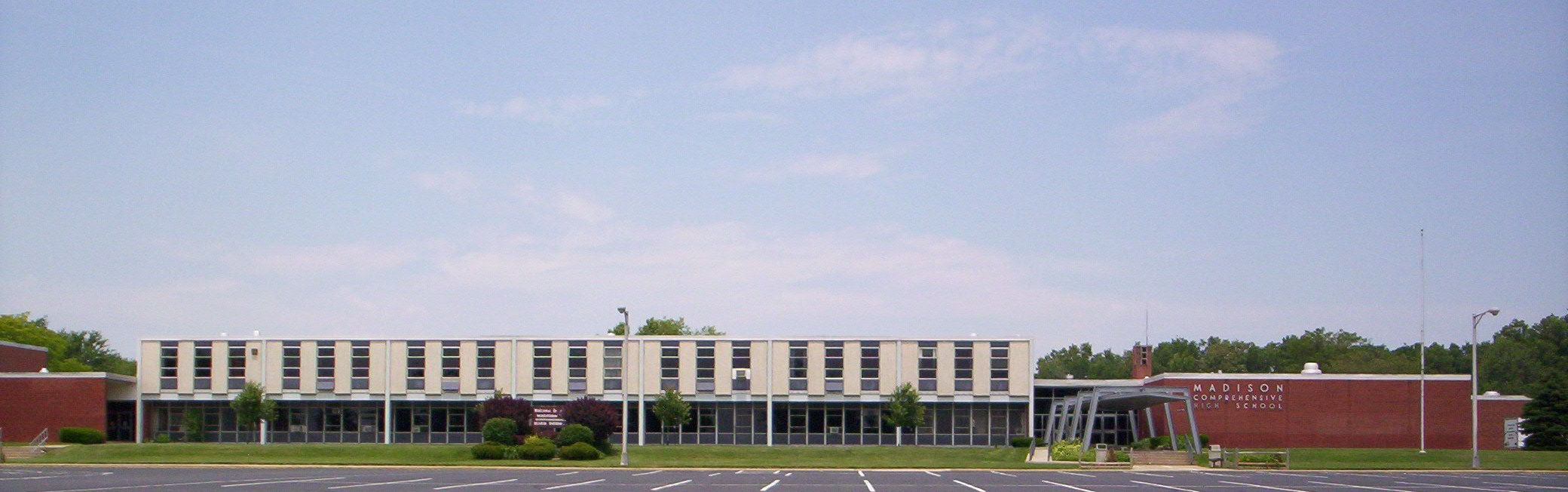

Location
- 600 Esley Lane; Mansfield, Ohio 44905; United States
- Coordinates: 40.774444°N 82.460278°W

Information
- Type: Public
- Principal: Sean Conway
- Teaching staff: 64.80 (FTE)
- Grades: 9–12
- Enrollment: 882 (2023-2024)
- Student to teacher ratio: 13.61
- Colors: Green and white
- Athletics conference: Ohio Cardinal Conference
- Team name: Rams
- Website: www.mlsd.net/o/mchs

Madison Comprehensive High School is a public high school in Madison Township, near Mansfield, Ohio, United States. It is the only high school in the Madison Local School District. Athletic teams are known as the Rams and the school colors are green and white.

== State championships ==
- Girls Volleyball – 1997
- Girls Soccer - 2020

== Notable alumni ==
- Justin Edwards - Professional mixed martial artist for the Ultimate Fighting Championship (UFC) Lightweight Division
- Taylor Huff - soccer player
- Lee Owens - College football head coach
- Ryan Pore professional soccer player
