= Madison Township, Richland County, Ohio =

Township in Ohio, US

- Township
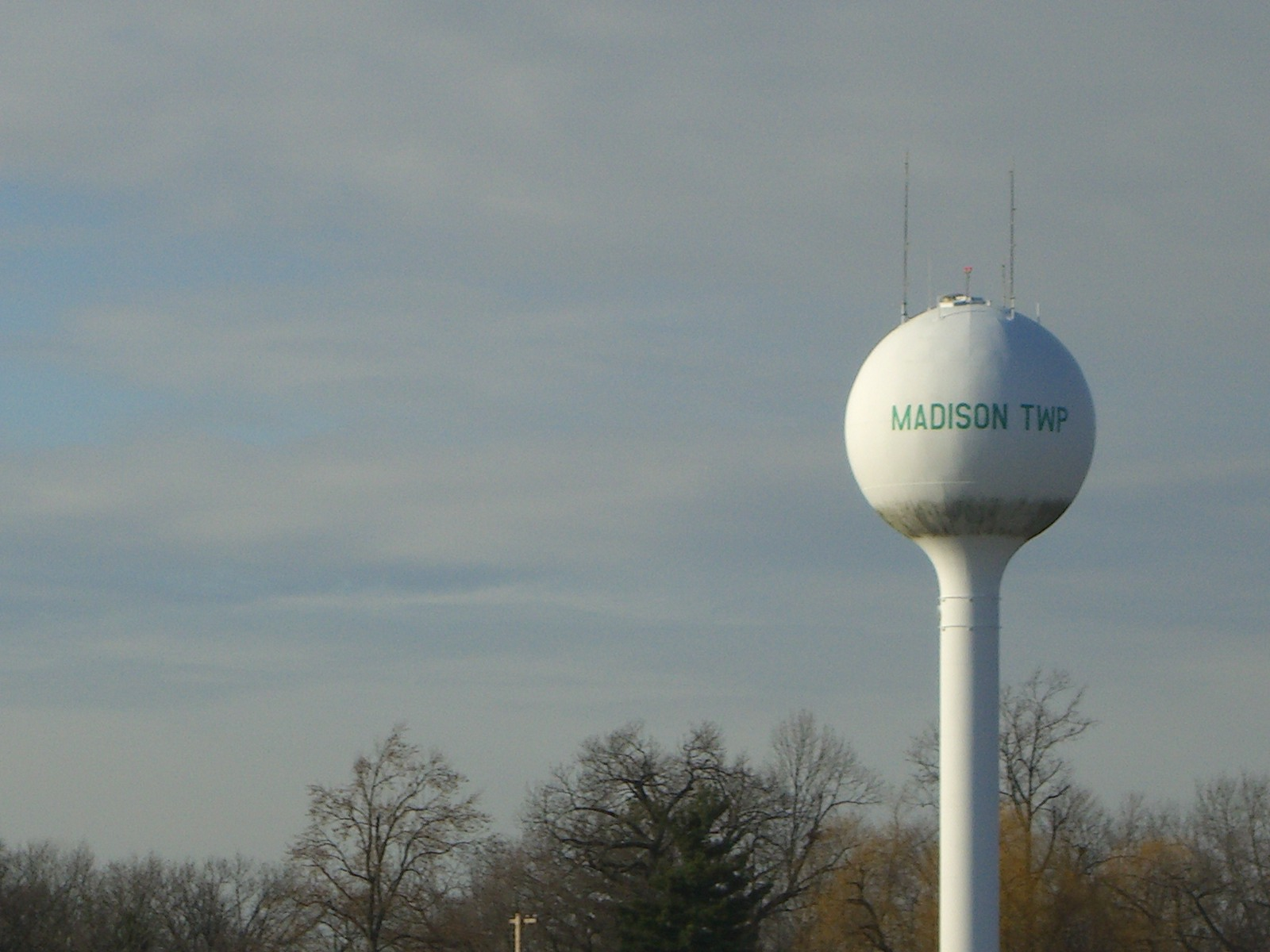
- Madison Township water tower near U.S. Route 30

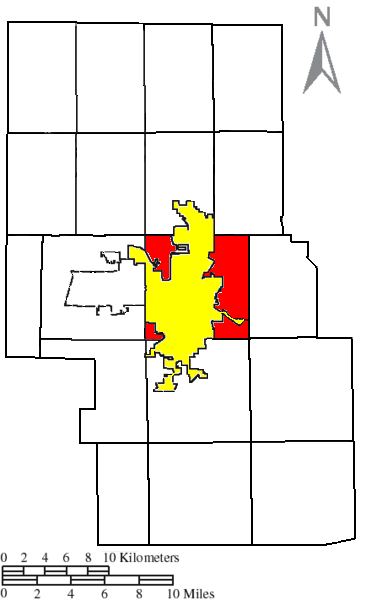
- Location of Madison Township (red) in Richland County, next to the city of Mansfield (yellow).
- Coordinates: 40°46′44″N 82°29′31″W
- Country: United States
- State: Ohio
- County: Richland

Area
  - Total: 15.7 sq mi (40.6 km^{2})
  - Land: 15.7 sq mi (40.6 km^{2})
  - Water: 0 sq mi (0.0 km^{2})
- Elevation: 1,211 ft (369 m)

Population (2020)
  - Total: 11,106
  - Density: 708/sq mi (274/km^{2})
- Time zone: UTC-5 (Eastern (EST))
  - Summer (DST): UTC-4 (EDT)
- FIPS code: 39-46578
- GNIS feature ID: 1086878
- Website: https://madisontwp.us/

Madison Township is one of the eighteen townships of Richland County, Ohio, United States. It is a part of the Mansfield Metropolitan Statistical Area. The 2020 census found 11,106 people in the township.

== Geography ==
Madison Township is centered at 40°47'22" North, 82°28'36" West (40.789444, -82.476666).

Located in the center of the county, it borders the following townships:

- Franklin Township - north
- Weller Township - northeast
- Mifflin Township - east
- Monroe Township - southeast corner
- Washington Township - south
- Troy Township - southwest corner
- Springfield Township - west
- Jackson Township - northwest corner

Most of Madison Township is occupied by the city of Mansfield, the county seat of Richland County. The census-designated place (CDP) of Lincoln Heights is in the east-central part of the township, and the CDP of Roseland is in the northwest.

== Name and history ==
It is one of twenty Madison Townships statewide.

== Government ==
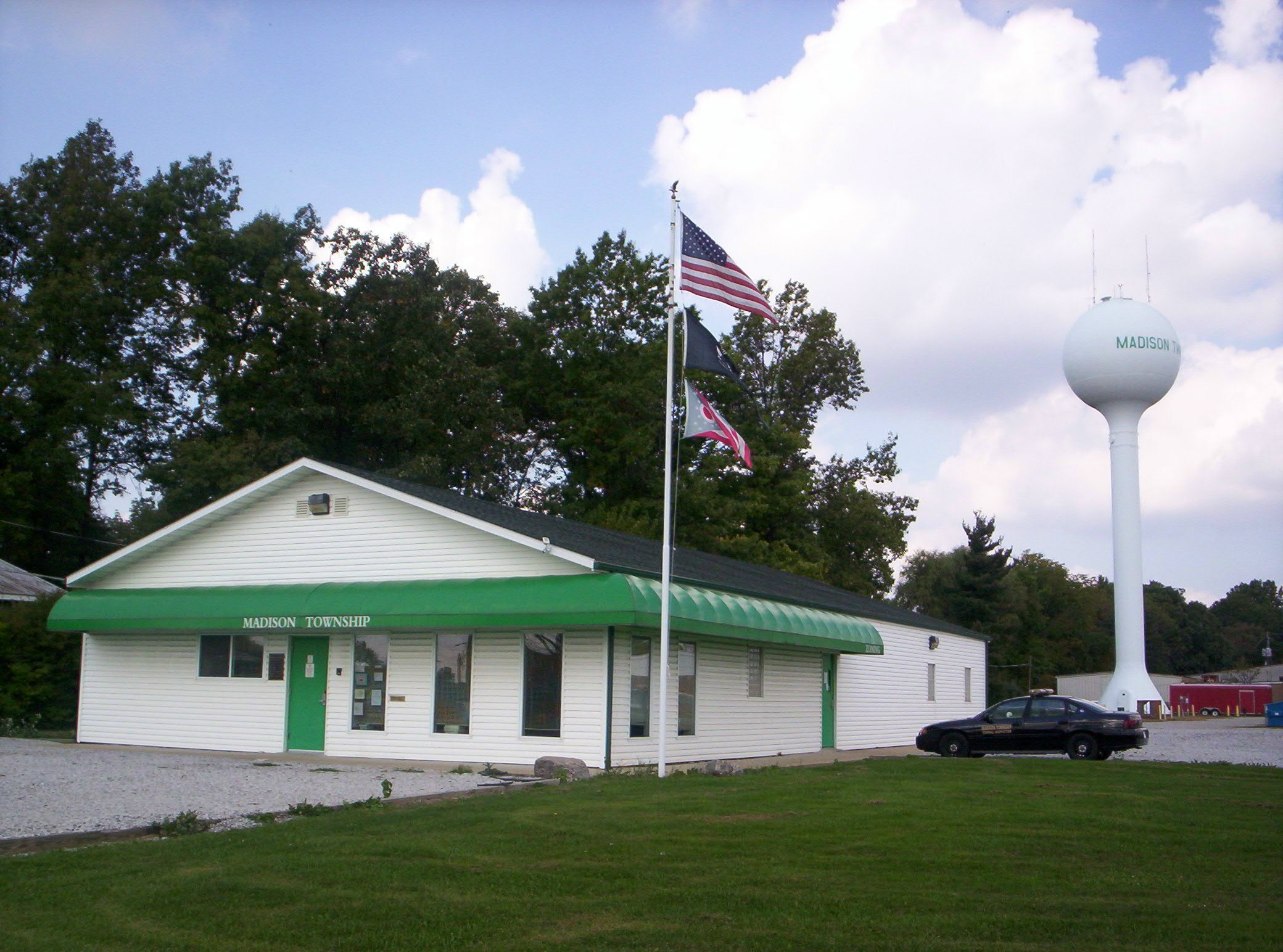
Madison Township Hall

The township is governed by a three-member board of trustees, who are elected in November of odd-numbered years to a four-year term beginning on the following January 1. Two are elected in the year after the presidential election and one is elected in the year before it. There is also an elected township fiscal officer, who serves a four-year term beginning on April 1 of the year after the election, which is held in November of the year before the presidential election. Vacancies in the fiscal officership or on the board of trustees are filled by the remaining trustees.

== Public services ==
=== Education ===
Madison Local Schools enroll 3,218 students as of 2012–2013. The district operates 5 public schools including three elementary schools, one middle school, and one high school. Also located in the school district is the Madison Adult Career Center (formerly Madison Adult Education). The adult education facility is located at Madison Comprehensive High School.

=== Emergency services ===
Law enforcement in Madison Township is the responsibility of the Richland County Sheriff's Office, and fire protection and ambulance services are provided by the Madison Township Fire Department.
