= Wooster High School (Ohio) =

Public school in Ohio, United States

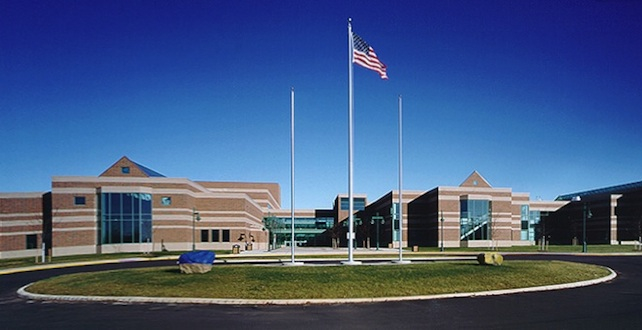

Location
- 515 Oldman Road; Wooster, Ohio 44691; United States; 40°50′14″N 81°56′47″W

Information
- Type: Public, Co-Ed
- Motto: Inspiring World-Class Academic Achievement
- School district: Wooster City School District
- School number: 365630
- Principal: Margaret Davis
- Teaching staff: 60.63 (FTE)
- Grades: 8–12
- Student to teacher ratio: 19.21
- Language: English
- Colors: Blue & Gold
- Athletics conference: Ohio Cardinal Conference
- Nickname: Generals
- Rival: Orrville Red Riders, Ashland Arrows
- Newspaper: The Wooster Blade
- Yearbook: The Legacy
- Website: woostercityschools.org/hs

Wooster High School is a public high school in Wooster, Ohio, United States. It is the only high school in the Wooster City School District. Athletic teams are known as the Generals, and they compete in the Ohio High School Athletic Association as a member of the Ohio Cardinal Conference.

== Athletics ==
Wooster High School has 26 athletic teams, of which 12 are for boys, 13 are for girls, and 1 is Co-Ed which compete in the Ohio Cardinal Conference of the Ohio High School Athletic Association. Wooster's teams are dubbed the "Generals". named after American Revolutionary War General David Wooster.

Boys' Sports

- Baseball
- Basketball
- Bowling
- Cross country
- Football
- Golf
- Lacrosse
- Soccer
- Swimming
- Tennis
- Track and field
- Wrestling

Girls' Sports

- Basketball
- Bowling
- Cheerleading
- Cross country
- Gymnastics
- Golf
- Lacrosse
- Soccer
- Softball
- Swimming
- Tennis
- Track and field
- Volleyball

Co-Ed

- Wheelchair basketball

Wooster's football rivalry with the Orrville High School Red Riders is the oldest rivalry in Wayne County, having first met back in 1903. The Generals currently lead the rivalry by a 52-42-9 margin. After the 2014 season, the teams have met 104 times.

=== OHSAA State championships ===
- Boys' golf – 1980

=== Non-OHSAA sanctioned state championships ===
Wheelchair basketball - 2018, 2019, 2020, 2022, 2023

Boys' lacrosse - 1998, 2002

== Awards ==
Wooster has received recognition for having appeared the most times at national speech and debate tournaments, with sixty-three appearances since the early 1930s. The Wooster High School Speech and Debate team was crowned state champions by the OHSSL in 2001, 2002, 2006 and 2015.

Wooster is the first school district in the state of Ohio to launch an inter-scholastic adaptive sports team for students with physical disabilities. The Wooster Generals wheelchair basketball teams won the first five Ohio Interscholastic Adaptive Sports state championships and had a 59-game winning streak from 2016 to 2022. Team alumnus Evan Heller (class of 2020) went on to play for Auburn University and the USA under-20 national team.

== Notable alumni ==
- Bina Venkataraman, science policy expert, author and journalist
- Marquise Blair, professional football player in the National Football League (NFL)
- Kaiser Wilhelm, former professional baseball player in the Major League Baseball (MLB)
- Bob Rhoads, former professional baseball player in the Major League Baseball (MLB)
- Charles Follis, former professional baseball and football player
- Dick Schafrath, former professional football player, politician and author
- Vicki Nelson-Dunbar, former professional tennis player
- Charles S. Schollenberger, former chemist
- Sarah Hider, beauty pageant contestant
