= Dover, Ohio =

- City
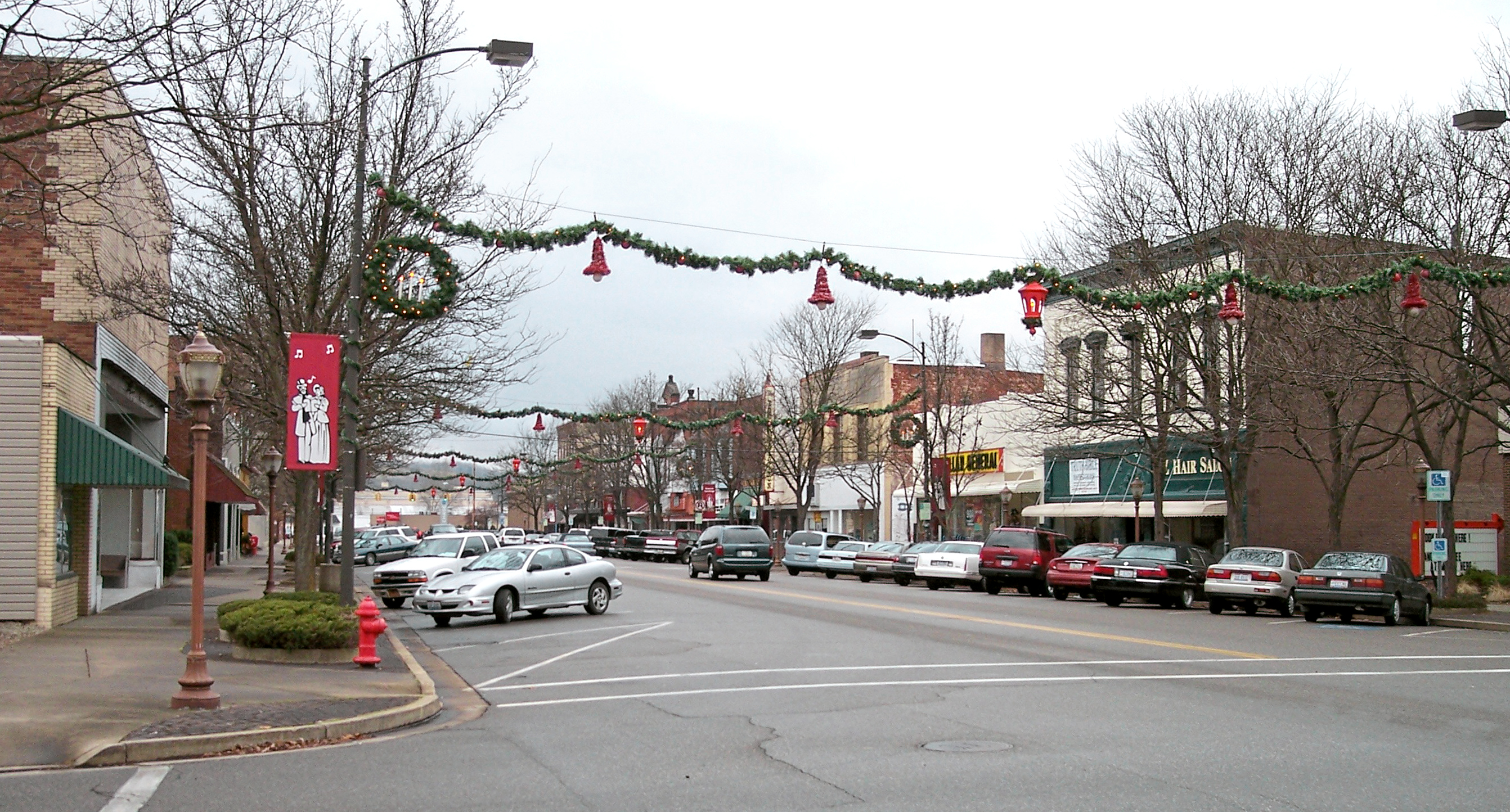
- West Third Street in downtown Dover
- Interactive map of Dover, Ohio
- Location within Ohio Location within the United States
- Coordinates: 40°31′36″N 81°28′40″W
- Country: United States
- State: Ohio
- County: Tuscarawas

Government
  - Mayor: Shane Gunnoe (R)

Area
  - Total: 5.90 sq mi (15.28 km^{2})
  - Land: 5.80 sq mi (15.01 km^{2})
  - Water: 0.10 sq mi (0.27 km^{2})
- Elevation: 909 ft (277 m)

Population (2020)
  - Total: 13,112
  - Estimate (2023): 12,985
  - Density: 2,263.0/sq mi (873.75/km^{2})
- Time zone: UTC-5 (Eastern (EST))
  - Summer (DST): UTC-4 (EDT)
- ZIP code: 44622
- Area code: 330
- FIPS code: 39-22456
- GNIS feature ID: 2394554
- Website: http://www.doverohio.com/

Dover is a city in Tuscarawas County, Ohio, United States, along the Tuscarawas River. The population was 13,112 at the 2020 census. It is a principal city of the New Philadelphia–Dover micropolitan area, approximately 68 miles (109 km) south of Cleveland and borders the city of New Philadelphia.

== History ==
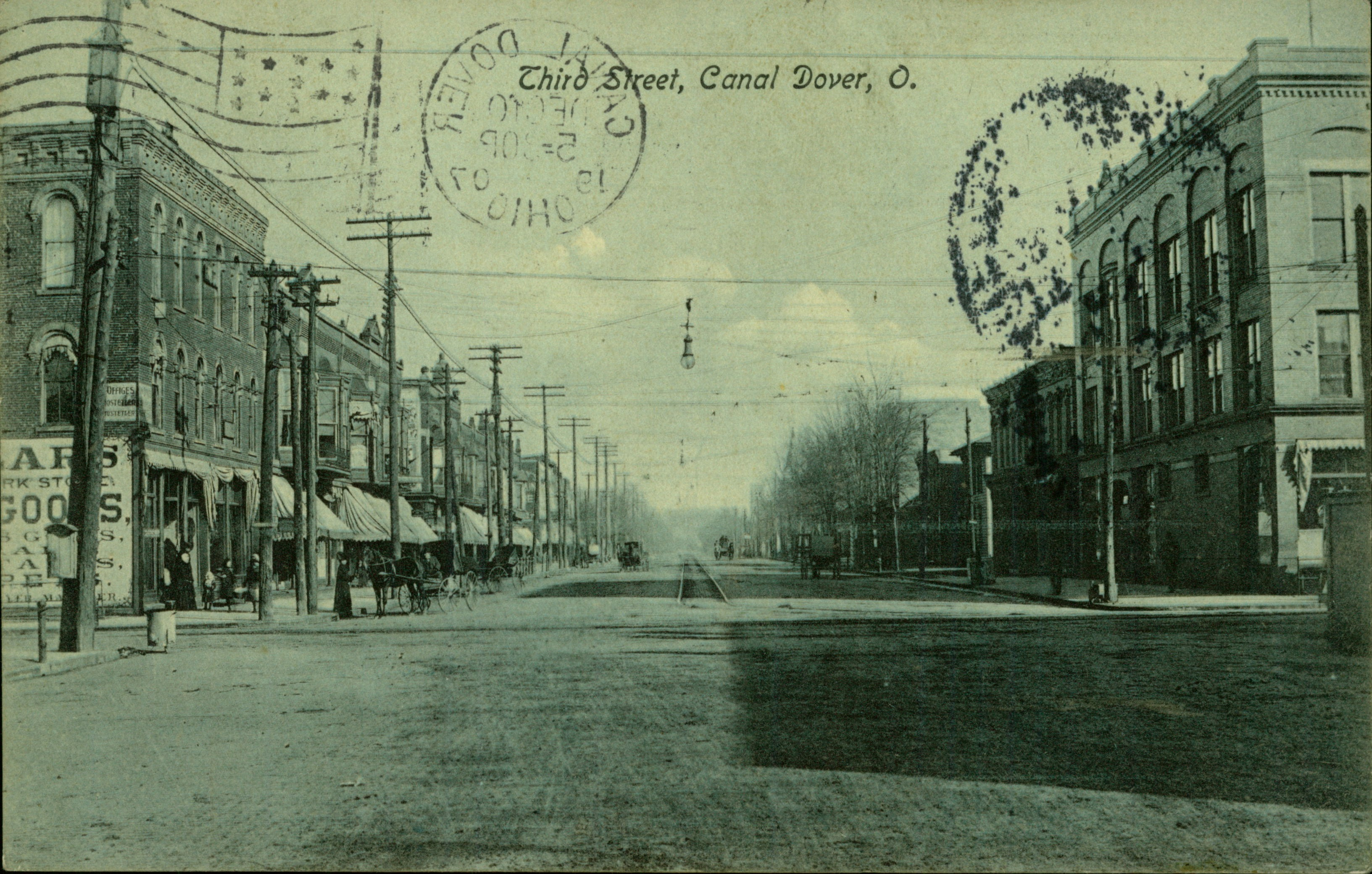
Third Street in Canal Dover, 1910

Originally named Canal Dover due to its location and origins along the Ohio and Erie Canal, the land was platted in 1807, with Christian Deardorff and Jesse Slingluff recognized as the founders. Beginning in 1815, the post office first began operation. Canal Dover incorporated as a village in 1842 and became a city under the Ohio municipal code of 1903. On February 12, 1916, the city officially changed its name to Dover.

== Geography ==
Dover is located along the Tuscarawas River, near the mouth of Sugar Creek.

According to the United States Census Bureau, the city has a total area of 5.79 square miles (15.00 km^{2}), of which 5.69 square miles (14.74 km^{2}) is land and 0.10 square miles (0.26 km^{2}) is water.

== Demographics ==
Historical population
Census	Pop.	Note	%±
1840	598		—
1860	1,343		—
1870	1,593		18.6%
1880	2,208		38.6%
1890	3,470		57.2%
1900	5,422		56.3%
1910	6,621		22.1%
1920	8,101		22.4%
1930	9,716		19.9%
1940	9,691		−0.3%
1950	9,852		1.7%
1960	11,300		14.7%
1970	11,516		1.9%
1980	11,500		−0.1%
1990	11,329		−1.5%
2000	12,210		7.8%
2010	12,826		5.0%
2020	13,112		2.2%
2023 (est.)	12,985		−1.0%

=== 2020 census ===
As of the 2020 census, Dover had a population of 13,112. The median age was 42.0 years. 22.1% of residents were under the age of 18 and 23.1% of residents were 65 years of age or older. For every 100 females there were 94.4 males, and for every 100 females age 18 and over there were 90.3 males age 18 and over.

99.8% of residents lived in urban areas, while 0.2% lived in rural areas.

There were 5,366 households in Dover, of which 27.5% had children under the age of 18 living in them. Of all households, 46.7% were married-couple households, 17.6% were households with a male householder and no spouse or partner present, and 29.0% were households with a female householder and no spouse or partner present. About 32.6% of all households were made up of individuals and 17.5% had someone living alone who was 65 years of age or older.

There were 5,766 housing units, of which 6.9% were vacant. The homeowner vacancy rate was 0.9% and the rental vacancy rate was 8.5%.

Racial composition as of the 2020 census
Race	Number	Percent
White	11,250	85.8%
Black or African American	143	1.1%
American Indian and Alaska Native	414	3.2%
Asian	64	0.5%
Native Hawaiian and Other Pacific Islander	13	0.1%
Some other race	657	5.0%
Two or more races	571	4.4%
Hispanic or Latino (of any race)	1,391	10.6%

=== 2010 census ===
As of the census of 2010, there were 12,826 people, 5,181 households, and 3,297 families living in the city. The population density was 2,254.1 inhabitants per square mile (870.3/km^{2}). There were 5,578 housing units at an average density of 980.3 per square mile (378.5/km^{2}). The racial makeup of the city was 94.1% White, 1.1% African American, 0.6% Native American, 0.5% Asian, 0.7% Pacific Islander, 1.7% from other races, and 1.4% from two or more races. Hispanic or Latino of any race were 4.1% of the population.

There were 5,181 households, of which 28.5% had children under the age of 18 living with them, 49.7% were married couples living together, 9.8% had a female householder with no husband present, 4.1% had a male householder with no wife present, and 36.4% were non-families. 31.6% of all households were made up of individuals, and 15.6% had someone living alone who was 65 years of age or older. The average household size was 2.37 and the average family size was 2.96.

The median age in the city was 42.9 years. 22.3% of residents were under the age of 18; 7.3% were between the ages of 18 and 24; 22.9% were from 25 to 44; 25.6% were from 45 to 64; and 22% were 65 years of age or older. The gender makeup of the city was 47.4% male and 52.6% female.

=== 2000 census ===
As of the census of 2000, there were 12,210 people, 4,996 households, and 3,362 families living in the city. The population density was 2,319.6 inhabitants per square mile (895.6/km^{2}). There were 5,233 housing units at an average density of 994.2 per square mile (383.9/km^{2}). The racial makeup of the city was 97.09% White, 1.27% African American, 0.25% Native American, 0.51% Asian, 0.02% Pacific Islander, 0.20% from other races, and 0.66% from two or more races. Hispanic or Latino of any race were 0.60% of the population.

There were 4,996 households, out of which 30.2% had children under the age of 18 living with them, 54.4% were married couples living together, 10.0% had a female householder with no husband present, and 32.7% were non-families. 28.8% of all households were made up of individuals, and 14.9% had someone living alone who was 65 years of age or older. The average household size was 2.39 and the average family size was 2.94.

In the city, the population was spread out, with 24.1% under the age of 18, 6.7% from 18 to 24, 26.8% from 25 to 44, 22.5% from 45 to 64, and 19.9% who were 65 years of age or older. The median age was 40 years. For every 100 females, there were 86.9 males. For every 100 females age 18 and over, there were 83.1 males.

The median income for a household in the city was $36,665, and the median income for a family was $44,604. Males had a median income of $34,579 versus $22,397 for females. The per capita income for the city was $18,928. About 7.5% of families and 9.2% of the population were below the poverty line, including 11.1% of those under age 18 and 9.7% of those age 65 or over.

== Arts and culture ==
Dover is adjacent to New Philadelphia, the county seat of Tuscarawas County, with the two cities considered twin cities. Each year, the "Crimson Tornadoes" of Dover High School play the rival "Quakers" of New Philadelphia in a football game that has been played annually for more than a century, and is the fourth longest-running football rivalry in the state of Ohio.

The Dover Public Library was founded in 1902 by the American Sheet and Tin Plate Company as a benefit for their employees. The first library was located on the corner of Front Street and Factory Street and moved in 1907 to a home on Cherry Street and Fifth Street known as “the old Downey residence.” It was in 1907 that the American Sheet and Tin Plate Company turned the library over to the community so that the institution became a true public library open to all. In 1916 a new high school was constructed on the site of the library and the institution moved into the building’s basement. In 1934 the library moved across the street to a converted home at 417 N. Walnut Street. In 1953 the city of Dover passed a bond issue to build a new public library for the community. This new building, which still stands today, opened in 1955 and is located at 525 N. Walnut Street. Major renovations and additions of the library were made in 2001 with the construction of a new Community Room and Technology Center, in 2015 with the renovation of the Children’s Room, and in 2018 with the renovation of the Adult Department, Teen Room, and lower level. Currently, the Dover Public Library has nearly 17,000 cardholders throughout the Tuscarawas Valley and beyond. The Book Cellar Bookshop, which is operated by the Friends of the Dover Public Library-a 501©3 non-profit organization-is located in the library’s lower level.

== Education ==
Children in Dover are served by the public Dover City Schools, which includes three elementary schools, one middle school, and Dover High School.

== Notable people ==
- Hunter Armstrong, Olympic swimmer, Men's 4 × 100 Gold medal winner at Tokyo 2020
- Elwyn Berlekamp, mathematician
- James R. Black, actor and former National Football League player for the Cleveland Browns
- Frank Ellwood, former head football coach of Marshall University and Georgia Southern University
- Percival "Perci" Garner, III, Major League Baseball player for the Cleveland Indians (2016)
- Vic Gilliam, member of the Oregon House of Representatives and actor
- Ernie Godfrey, college football coach and College Football Hall of Fame inductee
- Theophil Hildebrandt, mathematician
- Joseph C. Hisrich, educator and member of the Wisconsin State Assembly
- Monty Hunter, former National Football League player for the Dallas Cowboys and St. Louis Cardinals
- Frank "Doc" Kelker, college football All-American
- Al Landis, member of the Ohio House of Representatives
- Al Mays, 19th-century Major League Baseball pitcher
- Ray Mears, college basketball coach at the University of Tennessee
- Elliott Nugent, playwright, producer, and actor
- Chris Penso, Major League Soccer referee
- Bob Peterson, animator, screenwriter, and director at Pixar
- William Quantrill, guerrilla fighter, American Civil War
- Trevor J. Rees, former Kent State Golden Flashes head football coach and athletic director
- Allan Sayre, former member of the Ohio House of Representatives
- Mark Dean Schwab, child rapist and murderer
- Zack Space, former member of the United States House of Representatives
- Herald F. Stout, admiral in the United States Navy during World War II and namesake of the USS Stout.
- Al Veigel, former Major League Baseball player for the Boston Bees during the 1939 season
- Stan White, former National Football League player for the Baltimore Colts and Detroit Lions.
- Jeremiah Williamson, Episcopal Church clergyman, and 10th Bishop of the Episcopal Diocese of Albany, New York
- Johnny Wilson, former National Football League player for the Cleveland Rams
