= Mansfield Art Center =

Art centre in Mansfield, Ohio

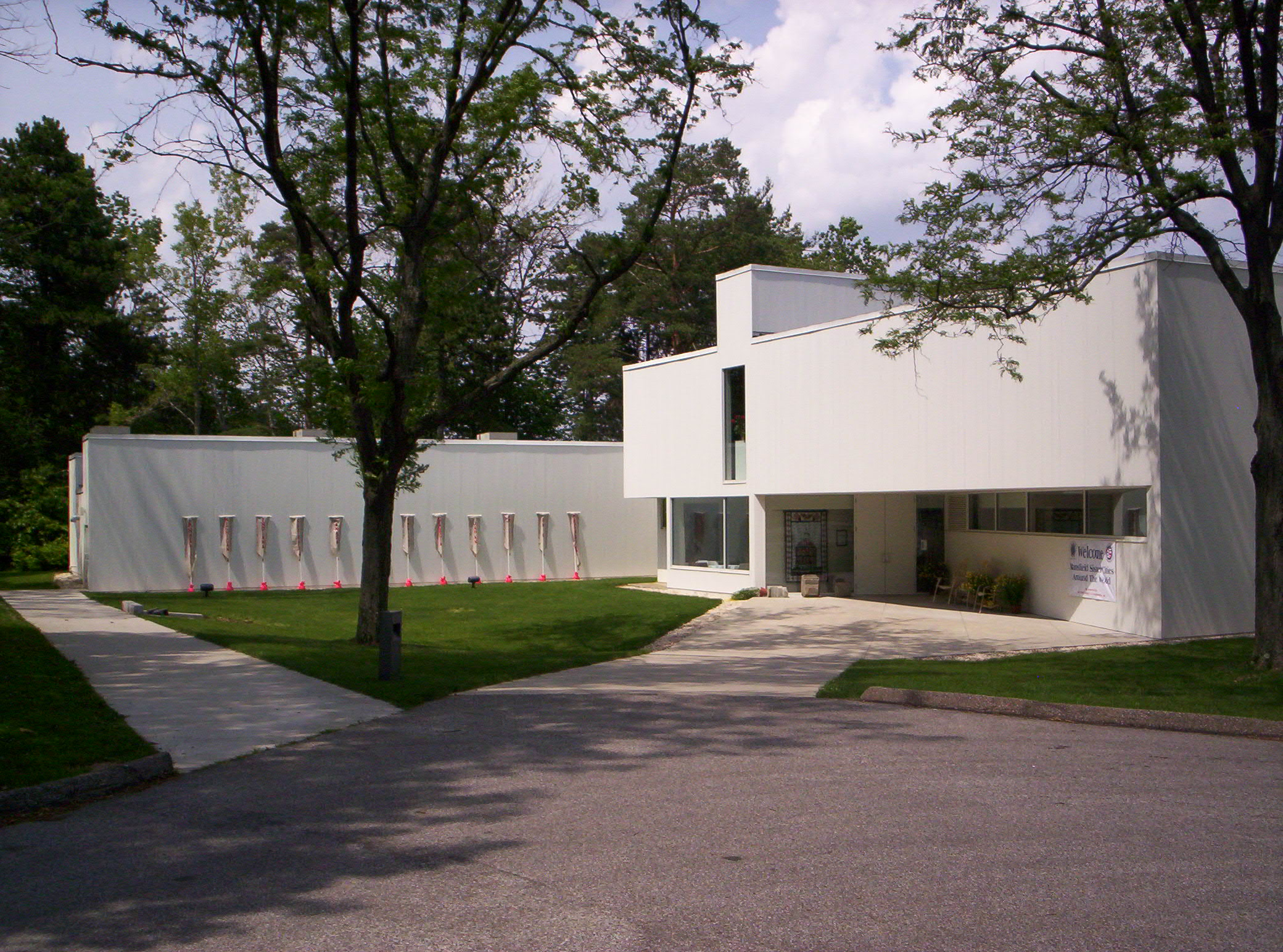
- Established: 1945
- Location: Mansfield, Ohio, USA
- Coordinates: 40.746667°N 82.541389°W
- Type: Art museum
- Website: mansfieldartcenter.org

The Mansfield Art Center is an art center in the Woodland neighborhood of Mansfield, Ohio, United States. The art center is operated by the Mansfield Fine Arts Guild, which was founded as a non-profit arts organization in 1945. Prior to the opening of the center, the guild presented exhibits and classes in private spaces but demand increased and the guild had temporary homes throughout the 1950s and 1960s that included the Mansfield/Richland County Public Library, the Leland Hotel and Kingwood Center. H. Daniel Butts III was hired as the guild's first full-time director and he was tasked with establishing a permanent home for the museum, its collection and classes. The building opened in 1971 and was designed by architect Don Hisaka. In the same year, it was the recipient of a Progressive Architecture National Citation Award.

In addition to a range of classes and hosting juried exhibits for the American Craft Council, the museum helps to celebrate the community's history.
