= Oak Hill Cottage =

Historic house in Ohio, United States

- U.S. National Register of Historic Places
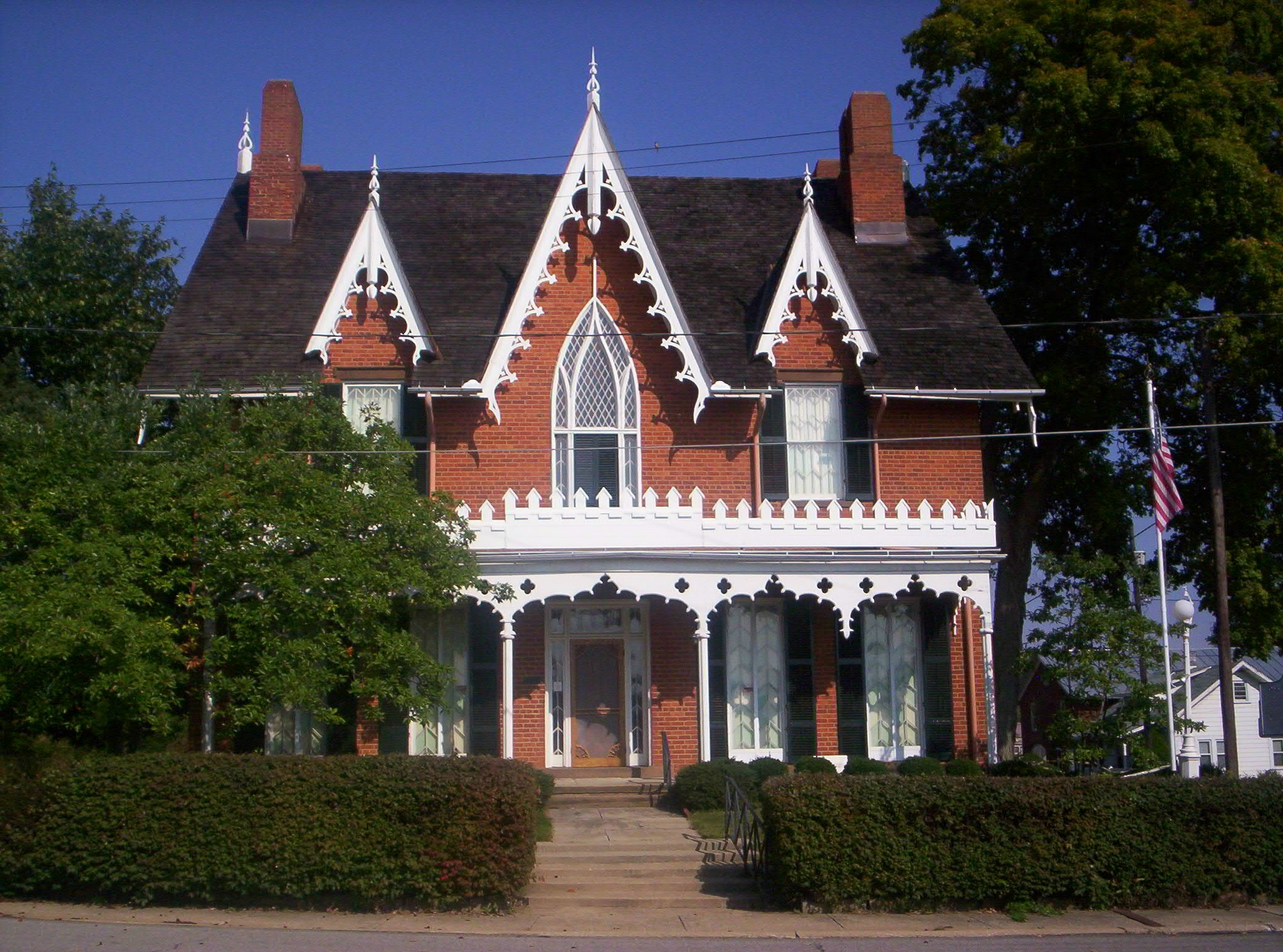
- Oak Hill Cottage, Mansfield, Ohio

- Location within Ohio Location within the United States
- Location: 310 Springmill Street, Mansfield, Ohio
- Coordinates: 40°46′04″N 82°31′04″W
- Built: 1847
- Architect: John Robinson
- Architectural style: Gothic Revival
- NRHP reference No.: 69000149
- Added to NRHP: June 11, 1969

Oak Hill Cottage, built in 1847 by John Robinson, superintendent of the Sandusky, Mansfield, and Newark Railroad, is an historic Gothic Revival brick house with Carpenter Gothic ornamentation located at 310 Springmill Street in Mansfield, Ohio, in the United States. All of the furnishings and artifacts inside the house are original to about the 1870s and have come down to the present, intact.

Robinson purchased the land for his home in April 1844 from Edward Wilkinson. He named the plot White Oak Hill. His home was later called, “The one perfect Gothic House I’ve seen in the United States,” by Ralph Adams Cram, architect of the Cathedral of St. John the Divine in New York City. The house was built near the railroad for the convenience of its owner, who wished to live near Mansfield's railroad and business district.

After falling on hard times financially, Robinson returned the house to the Farmer's Bank, which held it until it was bought by Mr. Harvey Hall in 1861.

It was acquired by its most prominent and famous owner, Dr. Johannes Jones in 1864 and was the home of his family for over a century. It was Dr. Jones’ wife Francis Barr Jones and their four daughters Madell, Bess, Ida, and Leile who made Oak Hill Cottage a showplace and the centerpiece of Mansfield's leading social affairs at the time.

It was the habit of Dr. Jones to hold informal receptions for musicians who were visiting and performing in Mansfield at Oak Hill.

Dr. Jones died in 1895 and his funeral services were held at Oak Hill Cottage. His wife Francis lived on in the home until her death in 1912.

The last private owner of the house was the Jones’ youngest daughter Leile Barrett. She maintained the home until her own declining fortunes and failing health caused her to allow the house to fall into disrepair. This led her to sell Oak Hill to the Richland County Historical Society in 1965.

The Historical Society restored the house and the furniture inside to about the year 1870, which was around when most of the items inside the house had been bought originally. It was finally open for public tours in 1983.

Oak Hill Cottage was the setting of The Green Bay Tree, Mansfield native and grand-nephew to Mrs. Jones Louis Bromfield's first novel. His fond memories of spending time in the home led him to memorialize it as “Shane’s Castle” in the 1924 novel.

On June 11, 1969, it was added to the National Register of Historic Places. It is now the Oak Hill Cottage and Museum.

== Underground Railroad stop legend ==
A common legend surrounding the Oak Hill Cottage is that the house was used as a stop on the Underground Railroad. This legend was disproved by Mrs. Ethel Zott, a relative of John Robinson, the house's first owner, during a newspaper interview. She stated that she doubted he would use his home as a link in the Underground Railroad. In fact, diary entries made by Robinson indicated that he was sympathetic to Southern slave-holding states and did not want Lincoln elected as president.

== Current use ==
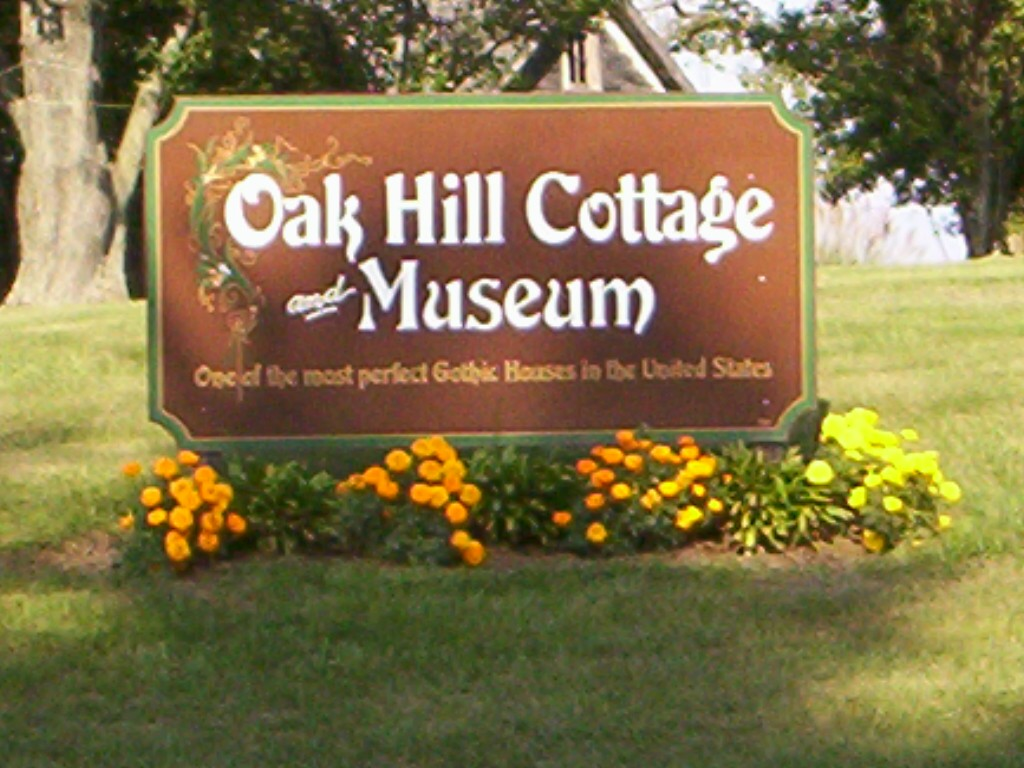
Welcome sign

The house was bought in 1965 by the Richland County Historical Society which has restored it and now maintains it as a museum open to the public.

== See also ==
- National Register of Historic Places listings in Richland County, Ohio
