= Mid-Ohio Opera =

Mid-Ohio Opera is an opera production company based in Mansfield, Ohio. Mid-Ohio Opera was incorporated in 2014. The company uses contemporary stagings of classic repertory. Mid-Ohio Opera tries to use non-traditional venues in a "pop-up" fashion. A registered 501c3, they rely on community support, corporate sponsorship, and grants.

Mid-Ohio Opera has a support guild and a community opera chorus.

== Performances ==
- Coffee Cantata, J.S. Bach 2014
- Il Pagliacci, Leoncavallo 2014
- Die Winterreise, F. Schubert 2015
- L'Elisir D'Amore, G. Donizetti 2015
- Hopera! - Beer. Opera. Feast!
- In Good Company (With The Richland Academy of the Arts RADE dancers.)
- Madama Butterfly, Puccini 2016
- Evensong 10/04/16
- Schubert and Schnitzel 10/22/16
- Christmas Oratorio, Camille Saint-Saëns 12/11/16
- La Bohème 2017
- Messiah 2017
- Il Tabarro 2018
- Un Ballo in Maschera 2018
- TEDx Mansfield, OH: Featured Performers 2018
- Messiah 2018
- Die Fledermaus 2018
- Death and Everyman 2019
- Cosi Fan Tutti 2019
- Carmen 2019
- Messiah 2019
- Bluebeard's Castle 2020
- Remainder of the 2020 Schedule was cancelled, due to COVID-19 pandemic.
- Mozart Mass in C Minor 2021
- Messiah 2021
- Trouble in Tahiti 2022
- Gianni Schicchi 2022
- Messiah 2022
- Amahl and the Night Visitors 2022
- Fidelio tour 2023
- Messiah 2023
- Wings of the Viking, premier workshop, Sophia Pavlenko-Chandley 2024

== External ==
- Official website
