= Mansfield Engineered Components =

- Company type: Private
- Founded: Mansfield, Ohio, 1939
- Headquarters: Mansfield, Ohio
- Key people: Bruce Cummins, CEO; Steve Cummins, Executive VP
- Products: Closure mechanisms, counterbalances and hinges for the major appliance market.
- Number of employees: 220
- Website: http://www.mansfieldec.com

Mansfield Engineered Components is a Mansfield, Ohio-based company that designs and manufactures closure mechanisms, counterbalances and hinges for the major appliance market.

== History ==
Mansfield Plating Company was founded by Otis Cummins Jr. in 1939. It provided metal finishing services for the automotive, appliance and furniture markets. In the 1960s, Cummins and his son Otis “Koke” Cummins III formed Mansfield Manufacturing, fabricating metal components for the company’s existing markets. The two companies merged to become Mansfield Industries in 1972. Another company, Mansfield Assemblies, was founded in 1987 to provide contract manufacturing and assembly operations. Mansfield Assemblies added a design and engineering group in 1989. On October 13, 2011, Mansfield Industries and Mansfield Assemblies announced a new name, Mansfield Engineered Components. In July 2023 MEC entered into a strategic partnership with The Sabaf Group, a world leader in the design and production of components for major appliance markets. Through the agreement, The Sabaf Group, based in Ospitaletto, Italy, acquired 51 percent ownership of Mansfield Engineered Components. The company continues to operate in its existing facilities, in Mansfield, Ohio, with its current management and existing employee base.

MEC employs 220 and operates from a 180,000-square-foot facility. Mansfield Engineered Components has received awards and recognition from some of its major customers for its ability to design and deliver custom closure mechanisms. The company was also named a 2010 United States Department of Energy Save Energy Now Energy Champion Plant.

== Current customers ==
- Bakers Pride
- BSH Bosch
- Electrolux
- General Electric Appliances
- Mabe
- The Manitowoc Company
- Panasonic
- Sub-Zero
- Viking Range
- Whirlpool Corporation
