= Renaissance Theatre (Mansfield, Ohio) =

- Ohio Theatre
- U.S. National Register of Historic Places
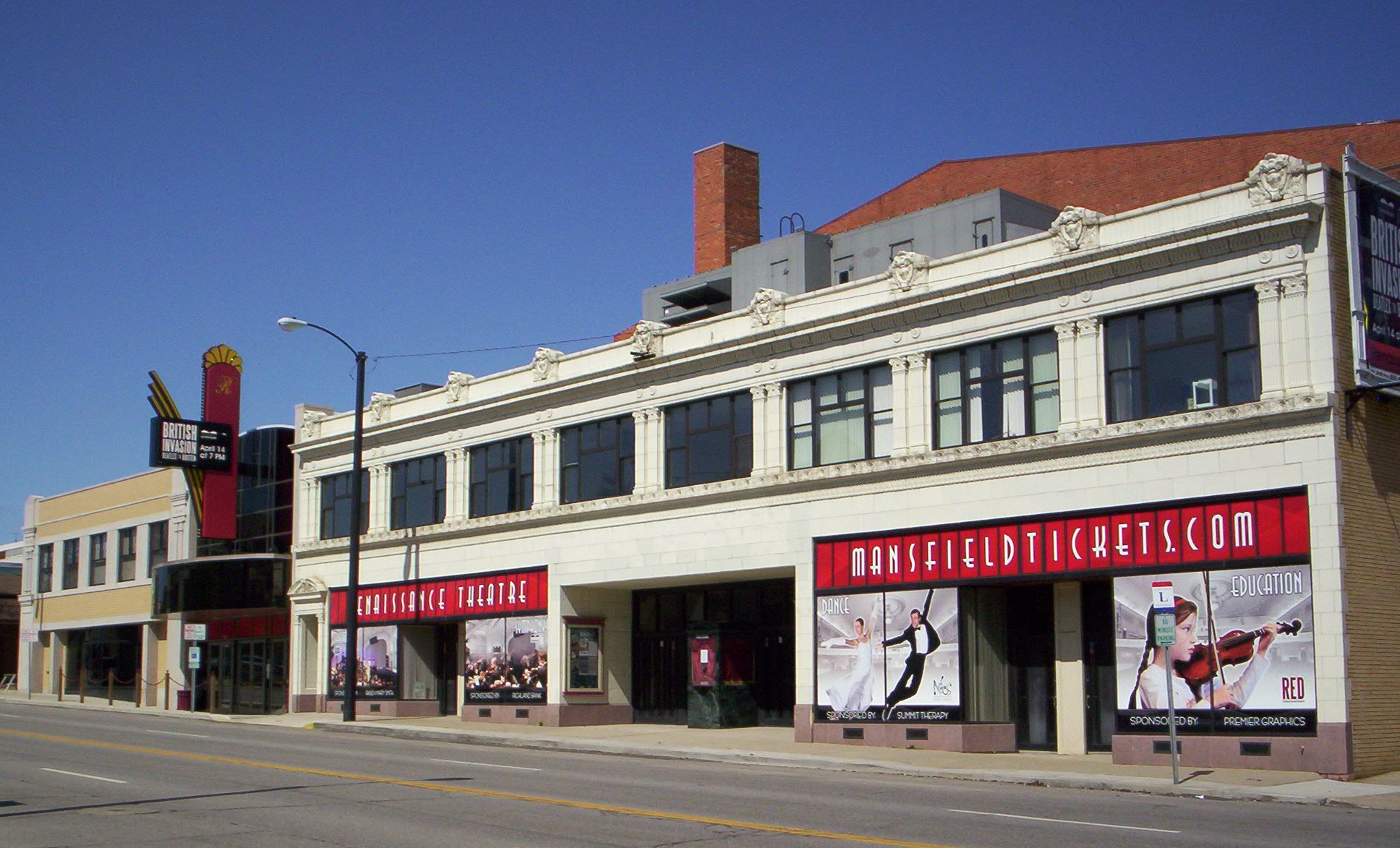
- Front of the theater after the expansion and makeover in March 2012.

- Location within Ohio Location within the United States
- Location: 138 Park Ave., W., Mansfield, Ohio
- Coordinates: 40°45′33″N 82°31′14″W
- Area: less than one acre
- Built: 1928
- Architectural style: Neo-Classical
- MPS: Park Avenue West MRA
- NRHP reference No.: 83002040
- Added to NRHP: May 31, 1983

The Renaissance Theatre, previously known as the Ohio Theatre, is a restored movie palace-type theater located at 138 Park Ave. W in Mansfield, Ohio. The 1,402-seat theater opened on January 18, 1928, as the Ohio Theatre and serves today as the largest performing arts center in North-Central Ohio. The Renaissance Performing Arts Association operates the facility and annually produces and presents approximately 40 productions consisting of Broadway-style musical theater shows, classical music concerts, comedy shows, educational performances and outreach programs, popular music concerts, special events, and family shows. The Renaissance is also home to the Mansfield Symphony Orchestra and the Miss Ohio Scholarship Pageant, the state competition for the Miss America Pageant.

== History ==
The Miss Ohio Pageant played a significant role in saving the Ohio Theatre and its renovation into the Renaissance Theatre. Mansfield originally hosted the Miss Ohio Pageant at the Ohio Theatre from 1959 through 1962. After Sandusky's Jacquelyn Mayer, Miss Ohio 1963, was crowned Miss America 1963, the Miss Ohio Pageant was relocated to the Ballroom Pavilion at Cedar Point Amusement Park in Sandusky. In 1975, the pageant returned to Mansfield, first to Malabar High School Auditorium from 1975 through 1978, then to the Madison Theatre in 1979. In 1980, it was decided to televise the pageant. Because of inadequate stage depth and backstage space at the Madison Theatre, then pageant producer Denny Keller and pageant set designer Paul Gilger persuaded the Miss Ohio Board of Directors to move the pageant back to Mansfield's Ohio Theatre, reopening the facility and sprucing it up for the pageant's first televised broadcast. The pageant's return to the old Ohio Theatre was the initial event that eventually led to the total renovation of the theatre and its reincarnation into the Renaissance Theatre. The Miss Ohio Scholarship Program has been held at the theatre continuously since 1980, for over 40 years.

In August 1980, the Ohio Theatre became The Renaissance Theatre. In January 1997, the theater's name was changed to The Renaissance when it merged with the Mansfield Symphony. On May 31, 1983, The Renaissance was added to the National Register of Historic Places. The original building was completely restored in 1985 at a cost of $2.25 million.

During the summer of 2008, construction began on expanding the Renaissance Theatre with the demolition of the condemned building that neighbored the theatre. Construction continued throughout the following year and the addition was opened into the existing structure in November 2009. The new portion of the theatre remained closed to the public until January 30, 2010, during the Grand Opening Gala. Grammy award winner, Sylvia McNair, performed for guests after dinner which was held in the new lobby. The new addition included the addition of an elevator that provided handicap access to all parts of the theatre for the first time, eleven offices for staff, a permanent music library for the Mansfield Symphony and Symphony Chorus, expanded restroom facilities, new concession area, two meeting spaces, and a coat check station.

On June 27, 2010, the marquee, that had been placed on the building during the 1984 restoration, was removed due to safety concerns. It was donated to the Mansfield Sailors and Soldiers Museum to be put on display at its original site, the area where the Madison Theatre stood. A new electronic marquee was installed on the new addition, during the 2008 expansion, to take the place of the Madison Marquee.

== See also ==
- List of concert halls
