= Donald Culliver =

Mayor of Mansfield, Ohio
- In office December 1, 2007 – November 30, 2011
- Preceded by: Lydia Reid
- Succeeded by: Timothy Theaker

Personal details
- Born: November 5, 1951 (age 74)
- Party: Democratic
- Spouse: Lillie Culliver

Donald Culliver (born November 5, 1951) is a former mayor of Mansfield, Ohio, having served from 2007 to 2011. He was the first African-American in history to be elected mayor of Mansfield, and also served on the city council through this 20-year public career.

== Early life and education ==
Culliver grew up in Mansfield, and was a graduate of Malabar High School before beginning a career as a licensed journeyman.

== Political career ==
His 2007 run for mayor was his first run for public office. He won the Mansfield mayoral election with 41% of votes with a margin of 4,862, defeating at-large city council member Doug Versaw (R) who received 32% of votes with a margin of 3,820 and William Anliker (Unendorsed R) who received 27% of votes with a margin of 3,159.

While campaigning for office in 2007, Mayor Culliver set a clear goal to get the community involved in our education system to help create a positive and progressive learning environment. In November 2008, he created the Mayor's Education Task Force, a volunteer community organization dedicated towards community involvement in the local education system.

On February 25, 2008, Culliver endorsed Illinois Senator Barack Obama for president, saying, "If we are going to make a better future for America, we need a leader who isn't invested in the political food fights of the past."

In 2009, Mayor Culliver partnered with local manufacturers, the business community, State Representative and House Majority Whip Jay Goyal, Commissioner Gary Utt, Governor Ted Strickland and Senator Sherrod Brown in the Mansfield Makes Sense for the New GM campaign towards keeping the local General Motors plant open. However, efforts were unsuccessful as the community received the final plan to close from GM Headquarters on July 31, 2009.

On November 8, 2011, Culliver was succeeded by Timothy Theaker, the first Republican elected to the position since Edward Meehan's tenure from 1981 to 1991.

In 1992, a library and learning center in Mansfield was opened in Culliver's name. The Culliver Reading Center operated until September 2020, when it closed due to funding issues caused by the COVID-19 pandemic.

== Family and personal life ==
Culliver remains a Mansfield resident, where he lives with his family.

== See also ==
- List of first African-American mayors

== Notes ==
Political offices
Preceded by Lydia Reid	Mayor of Mansfield, Ohio; 2007–2011	Succeeded by Timothy Theaker
