= Mayor's Education Task Force =

Non-profit public service organization located in Mansfield, Ohio

The Mayor's Education Task Force is a non-profit public service organization located in Mansfield, Ohio. It was founded in October 2008 by Donald Bryant and is the first volunteer organization in the State of Ohio to be granted special administrative powers by a city Mayor. In a ceremony at Malabar Middle School in May 2009, Mayor Donald Culliver officially introduced the Education Task Force as the first member of his volunteer services office. The mission of the Mayor's Education Task Force is geared to "Help Create a Positive Learning Environment" in the Mansfield Public City School system and is a community/citywide operation with offices located at Malabar Middle School, Mansfield Senior High School and a central downtown office at the Mayor's Office.

== History ==
The Mayor's Education Task Force was founded created in October 2008 in a response to the district's academic emergency status and low community support for the Mansfield City Public School system. Mansfield Mayor Donald Culliver called the community into action asking for a partnership formation with his administration to help raise academic standards. He delegated the activity of forming an education group to his intern assistant from Ohio State University Donald Bryant. In November 2008, Bryant began asking the Mansfield community for support but was heavily criticized for lack of management and education experience while Mayor Culliver faced challenges from political rivals. However, in January 2009, the Mayor's Education Task Force officially hit the ground running and gained key support from community members, churches and City Council member Patricia Hightower. In February 2009, the Mayor's Education Task Force earned support from the 42nd President of the United States, President Bill Clinton in Austin, Texas at the Clinton Global Initiative University Conference, stating a goal of getting elected officials involved in the education system.
