= Lydia Reid =

American politician

Lydia J. Reid

Mayor of Mansfield, Ohio
- In office 1993–2007
- Succeeded by: Donald Culliver

Personal details
- Born: 1938 or 1939 (age 86–87)
- Party: Democratic
- Spouse: Rodney Reid (m. 1979; died 2019)
- Profession: Politician

Lydia J. Reid (born 1938 or 1939) is an American politician of the Democratic Party who served as the first female and longest-serving mayor of Mansfield, Ohio encompassing three four-year terms from 1993 to 2007.

She retired due to term limits, after serving her last day in office on November 30, 2007; her successor Donald Culliver, the city's first black mayor, assumed office on December 1, 2007.

Lydia Reid was married to Rodney Reid from 1979 until his death in July 2019.
