= Gorman-Rupp Company =

Pump manufacturer in Mansfield, Ohio, US

- Traded as: NYSE: GRC; Russell 2000 Component
- Founders: J.C. Gorman; H.E. Rupp

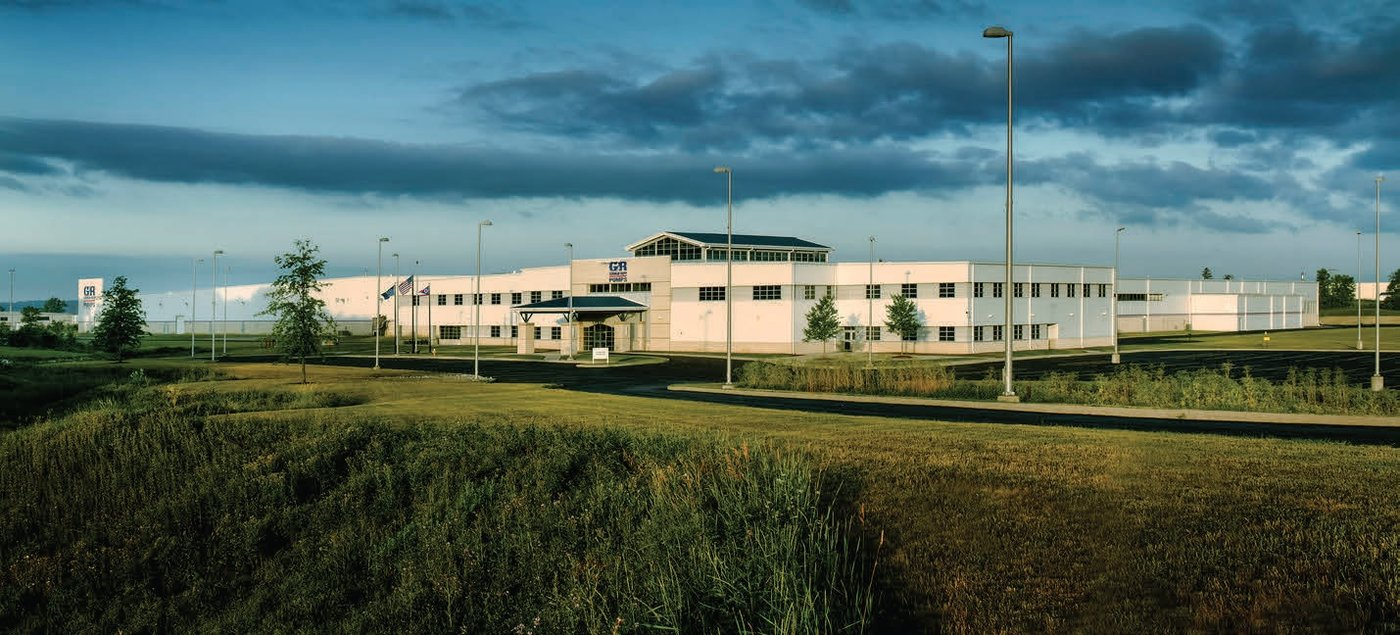
Gorman-Rupp Company headquarters, located in Mansfield, Ohio.

Gorman-Rupp (NYSE: GRC) is a pump manufacturer in Mansfield, Ohio. It manufactures pumps for municipal, water, wastewater, sewage, industrial, construction, petroleum, fire, and OEM markets. The company is traded on the New York Stock Exchange. Its current CEO is Scott King.

== History ==
Gorman-Rupp was founded in 1933 by two entrepreneurs, J.C. Gorman and Herb Rupp. Their simplified design of a self-priming, centrifugal pumps would form the core of their initial product line.

The company was contracted by the United States military during the Second World War. Diversifying their product line to include a variety of specialized pumps contributed to significant sales increase and growth in the post-war era.

In 2021, The Gorman-Rupp Company had sales of $378.3 Million and was listed by industrial database IndustrySelect as one of the largest pump manufacturers in the United States.

== Products ==
Pump types offered by Gorman-Rupp include:

- Self-priming Centrifugal
- Standard Centrifugal
- Submersible
- Rotary Gear
- Priming Assisted
- Hydraulic Piston
- Vertical Turbine
- Engine-Driven Diaphragm
- Axial Flow
- Mixed Flow
- Rotary Vane
- Bellows Metering
- Oscillating
- Packaged Lift Stations
- Booster Stations
