= Sandusky, Mansfield and Newark Railroad =

Map

The Sandusky, Mansfield, and Newark Railroad began in 1846 (179 years ago). It ran in Ohio from Sandusky to Newark. It was taken under control by the Baltimore and Ohio Railroad (B&O Railroad) in 1869. The B&O Railroad built a new mainline in the 1890s west from Willard. It lowered the line from mainline status.

The Sandusky, Mansfield, and Newark Railroad was operated into the 1970s and 80s. Some parts are still in use. For example: Newark to Mt. Vernon and Mansfield to Willard. Other parts are abandoned.
