= Kingwood Center =

Gardens and historic house in Mansfield, Ohio, United States

- Kingwood Center Gardens
- U.S. National Register of Historic Places
- U.S. Historic district
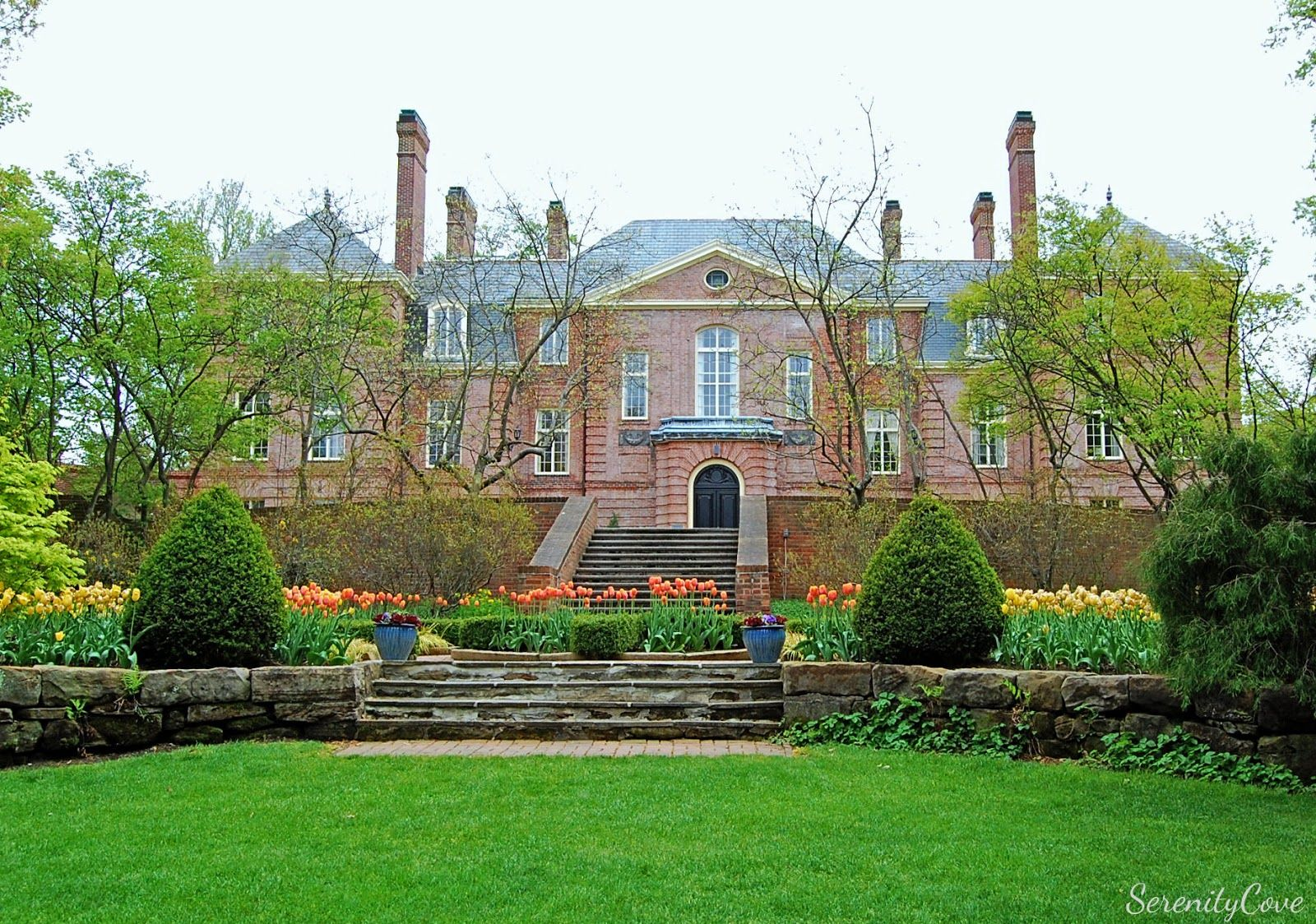
- Kingwood Center mansion and gardens

- Location within Ohio Location within the United States
- Location: 50 N. Trimble Road, Mansfield, Ohio
- Coordinates: 40°45′36″N 82°32′52″W
- Built: 1926
- Architect: C. Mack
- Architectural style: French Provincial
- Website: Official website
- NRHP reference No.: 76001523
- Added to NRHP: November 7, 1976

The Kingwood Center Gardens is a historic 47-acre (190,000 m^{2}) site with a house, Kingwood Hall, gardens and greenhouses located in Mansfield, Ohio.

Mr. Charles Kelley King began making his fortune when he was hired by the Ohio Brass Company as its first electrical engineer in 1893. He led Ohio Brass into new ventures, particularly the manufacture of electrical fittings for railroads and trolleys. Mr. King was responsible for much of the company's success and he eventually became president and chairman of the Board of Ohio Brass. Mr. King was married and divorced twice, and had no children.( The 1928 Architectural Record (Vol. LXIII, No.6, P.86) shows a floorplan of the house with a clear indication of "Son's Bedroom.")

The house and grounds were built in 1926 for King and his second wife, Luise, with grounds designed by Cleveland landscape architecture firm Pitkin and Mott. One year after his death in 1952, the 47-acre estate opened as a public garden to a private foundation that continues to operate Kingwood Center today. On November 7, 1976, it was added to the National Register of Historic Places.

== Current ==
In 1953 the estate became a public garden. The gardens are now open daily from 10am to 7pm. Admission is $10 per person (children 12 and under are free), and free for members and volunteers. Estate grounds currently include the following collections:

- Cacti and Succulent House - cacti and succulents.
- Daylily and Iris Collection - about 200 daylily cultivars, 54 Siberian iris cultivars, 50 cultivars of tall bearded iris, and 10 cultivars of reblooming tall bearded iris.
- Herb Garden (1977) - a knot garden in six sections, of herbs in juniper and boxwood edging.
- Historic Garden (1926) - a sequence of connected "rooms" enclosed by hedges, each built around a central feature such as a sunken garden, a small circular pool, a swimming pool, or a bronze sculpture of Pan.
- Parterre - boxwood edging filled with seasonal tulips and annuals.
- Perennial Garden - over 300 varieties of perennial plants in large borders.
- Rose Garden (1977) - nearly 500 roses, mainly hybrid teas and grandifloras, as well as a new section of David Austin roses.
- Terrace (1994) - seasonal beds of tulips and annuals, with a variety of shrubs.
- Tropical House - tropical plants, including Acalypha hispida (chenille plant), Acalypha wilkesiana 'Obovata Cristata' (copperleaf), Anthurium (flamingo flower), Codiaeum (croton), Cordyline fruticosa 'Fire Brand' (ti tree), Dichorisandra warscewicziana (blue ginger), Ficus deltoidea (mistletoe fig), Jatropha integerrima (spicy jatropha), Justicia brandegeeana (shrimp plant), and Rivina humilis (blood berry).
- Woodland - currently under development.

== Gallery ==
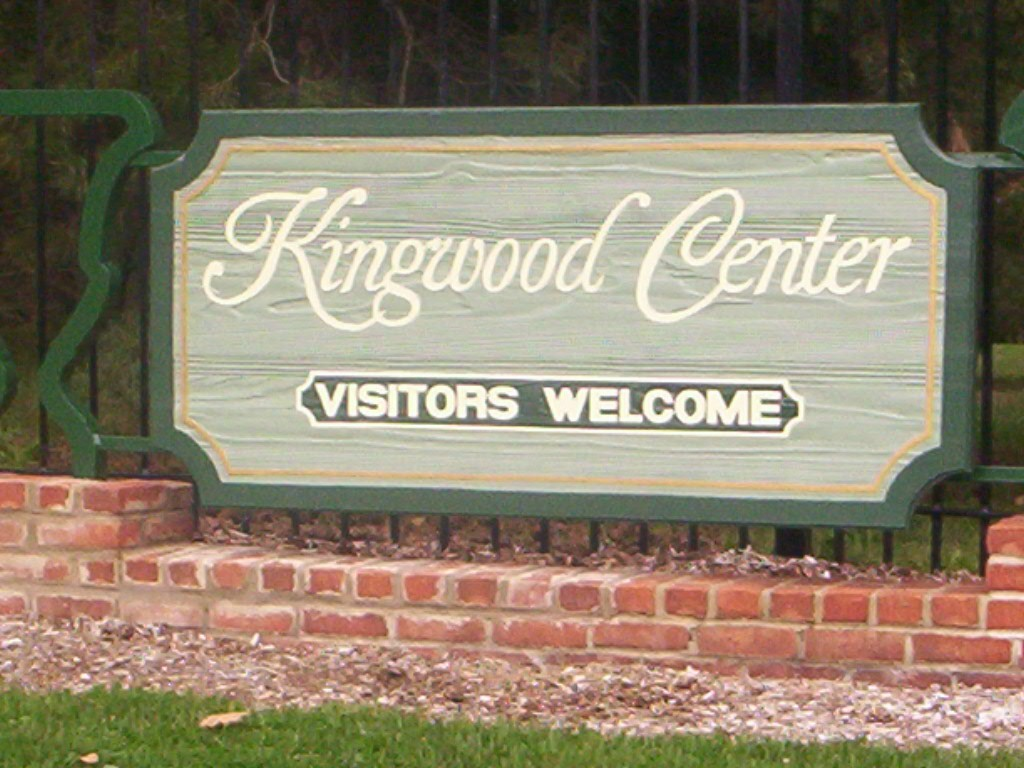
Welcome center sign.

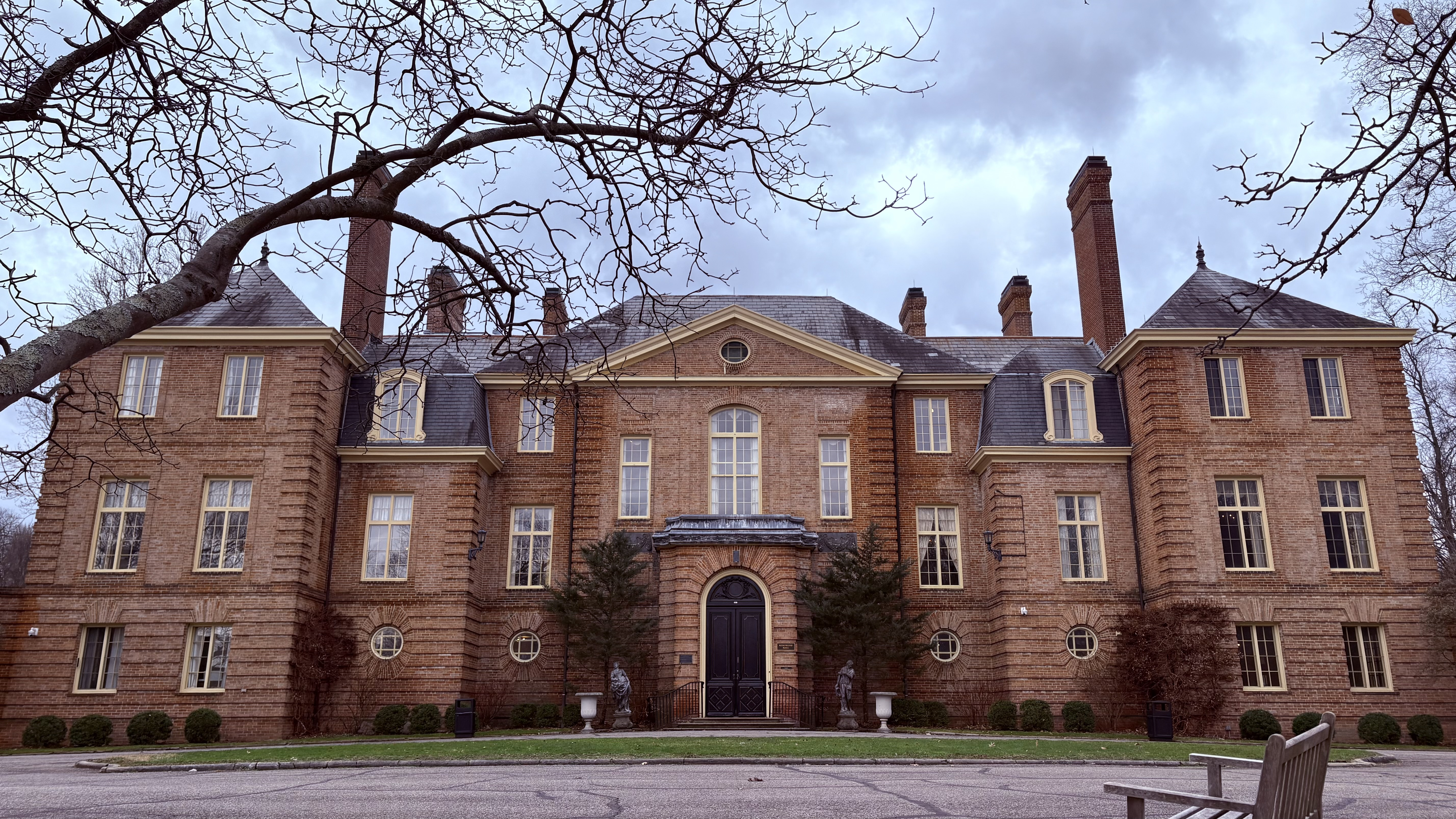
Close-up of the mansion.

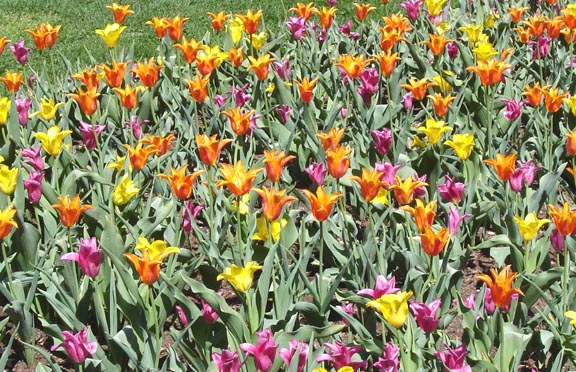
Flowers on display.

== See also ==
- List of botanical gardens in the United States
