= Rognel Heights, Baltimore =

Rognel Heights
- neighborhood statistical area
- Location within Baltimore
- Coordinates: 39°17′48″N 76°41′23″W
- Country: United States
- State: Maryland
- City: Baltimore

Area
  - Total: 0.163 sq mi (0.42 km^{2})
  - Land: 0.163 sq mi (0.42 km^{2})

Population (2020)
  - Total: 1,456
  - Density: 8,930/sq mi (3,450/km^{2})
- Time zone: UTC-5 (Eastern)
  - Summer (DST): UTC-4 (EDT)
- ZIP code: 21229
- Area code: 410, 443, and 667

Rognel Heights is a neighborhood in the Southwest District of Baltimore, sandwiched between Hunting Ridge (west) and Edmondson Village (east) along Edmondson Avenue (south). Gwynns Falls/Leakin Park begins at the neighborhood's northern edge. Its boundaries are marked by Swann Avenue on the western edge, North Woodington Road on the east and Edmondson Avenue on the southern edge. The neighborhood of Uplands is located to the south of Rognel Heights, on the opposite side of Edmondson Avenue.

The neighborhood's origin dates back to 1895, when a developer installed a water system and started building houses. Many of its current residences are row houses and brick duplexes built between 1940 and 1969, but the neighborhood also has frame houses pre-dating World War I.

== Demographics ==
Rognel Heights is a predominantly black neighborhood, with African Americans comprising 1,382 of its total reported population of 1,456 in the 2020 census.

== Public transportation ==
Three local bus routes provide service along Edmondson Avenue with stops along the southern boundary of Rognel Heights.

- CityLink Blue buses run between Woodlawn (west) and Johns Hopkins Bayview Medical Center (east).
- Route 77 buses connect Rognel Heights with Catonsville (west) and the West Baltimore MARC station (east). A spur of the Route 77 line runs along North Woodington Road between Edmondson Avenue (south) Gwynns Fall Leakin Park (north).
- Route 78 buses travel between Security Square Mall (west) and Downtown Baltimore (east).

== Small public parks ==
There are four small public parks within Rognel Heights.

- Rokeby Road Park, at Rokeby and Kevin Roads
- Flowerton Road Park, at Flowerton and Kevin Roads
- Kevin and Woodridge Park, at Woodridge and Kevin Roads
- Gelston Park, at Gelston Drive and Wicklow Road

== Nearby schools ==
- Baltimore International Academy West, a charter school located at 5300 Sidehill Road in Rognel Heights, serves 150 students from kindergarten through the 7th grade.
- Thomas Jefferson Elementary and Middle School, a public school at 605 Dryden Drive in Rognel Heights, teaches 396 students from pre-kindergarten through 8th grade.
- Edmondson-Westside High School, a vocational and academic public high school at 501 North Athol Avenue, has 967 students in grades 9 to 12. The school is located along the south side of Edmondson Avenue, across from Rognel Heights. When it opened September 5, 1957, on a 26-acre lot at the southwest corner of Edmondson and Athol Avenues, the school was originally named Westside Skill Center. After merging with Edmondson Senior High School in the Fall of 1985, it became Edmondson-Westside High School.

== Significant landmarks ==
A branch of the Enoch Pratt Free Library is located at 4330 Edmondson Avenue, at the northeast corner of Woodridge Road and Edmondson Avenue.

Edmondson Village Shopping Center is located along Edmondson Avenue between Swann Avenue and Woodridge Road in Rognel Heights.
