= Interstate 395 (Maryland) =

Short Interstate Highway in Baltimore, Maryland

Interstate 395
- Cal Ripken Way
- I-395 highlighted in red

Route information
- Auxiliary route of I-95
- Maintained by MDTA
- Length: 1.98 mi (3.19 km)
- Existed: 1981–present
- NHS: Entire route

Major junctions
- South end: I-95 in Baltimore
- Martin Luther King Jr. Boulevard in Baltimore
- North end: Howard Street and Camden Street in Baltimore

Location
- Country: United States
- State: Maryland
- Counties: City of Baltimore

Highway system
- Interstate Highway System; Main; Auxiliary; Suffixed; Business; Future; Maryland highway system; Interstate; US; State; Scenic Byways
← MD 393	→ MD 396

Interstate 395 (I-395) is an auxiliary Interstate Highway in the US state of Maryland. Known as Cal Ripken Way, the highway runs 1.98 miles (3.19 km) from I-95 north to Howard Street and Camden Street in Downtown Baltimore, where it provides access to the Inner Harbor and the Baltimore Convention Center. The Interstate also serves the Camden Yards Sports Complex, which contains M&T Bank Stadium and Oriole Park at Camden Yards, homes of the Baltimore Ravens and Baltimore Orioles, respectively. I-395 also serves as the southern terminus of Martin Luther King Jr. Boulevard, an urban arterial that provides a western bypass of Downtown Baltimore and connects I-95 with U.S. Route 40 (US 40), US 1, and I-83. The Interstate is maintained by the Maryland Transportation Authority (MDTA) and, like all Interstates, is a part of the National Highway System.

== Route description ==
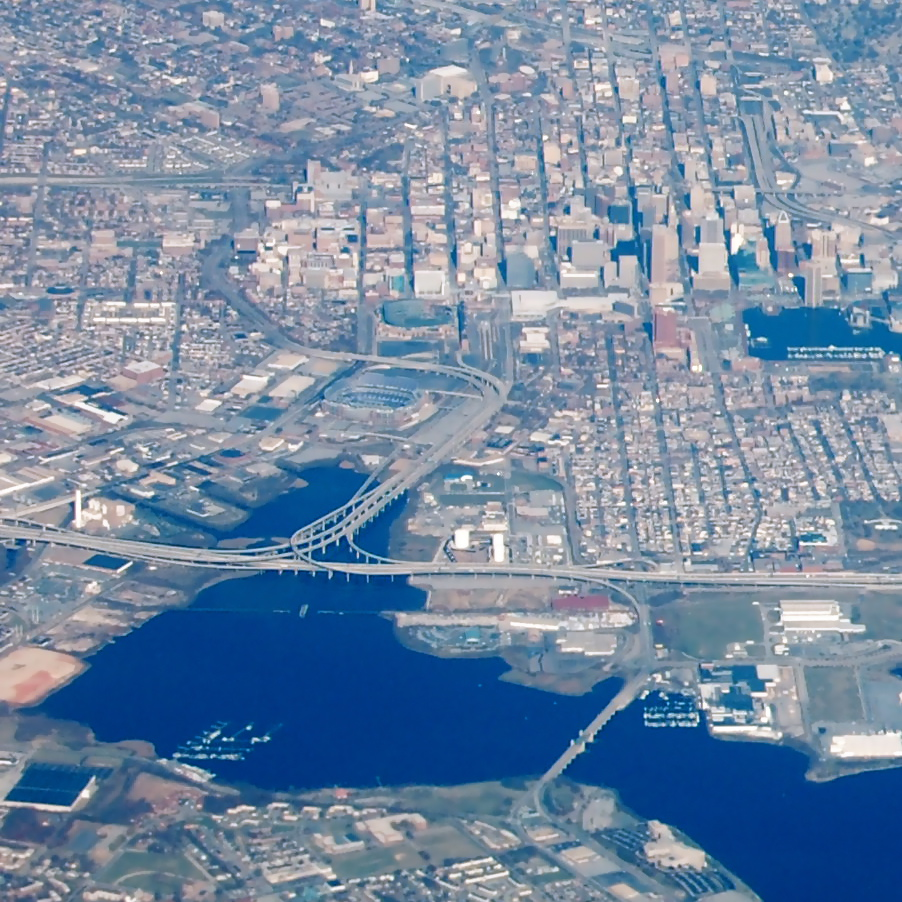
Aerial view of Downtown Baltimore that includes the entire lengths of I-395 and Martin Luther King Jr. Boulevard in the center and upper left

I-395 begins at a directional T interchange with I-95 that is entirely elevated above the Middle Branch of the Patapsco River, an estuary that receives Gwynns Falls just west of the interchange. The two-lane ramps from northbound I-95 to northbound I-395 and southbound I-395 to southbound I-95 pass over ramps from southbound I-95 to the southbound Baltimore–Washington Parkway and from the northbound parkway to northbound I-95. The one-lane ramp from southbound I-395 to northbound I-95 splits from the southbound I-95 ramp where the Interstate becomes a viaduct over land. I-395, which carries six lanes, passes to the west of the Federal Hill neighborhood and to the east of M&T Bank Stadium and begins to parallel Maryland Transit Administration's Baltimore Light RailLink and CSX Transportation's Baltimore Terminal Subdivision railroad line, which carries MARC Train's Camden Line.

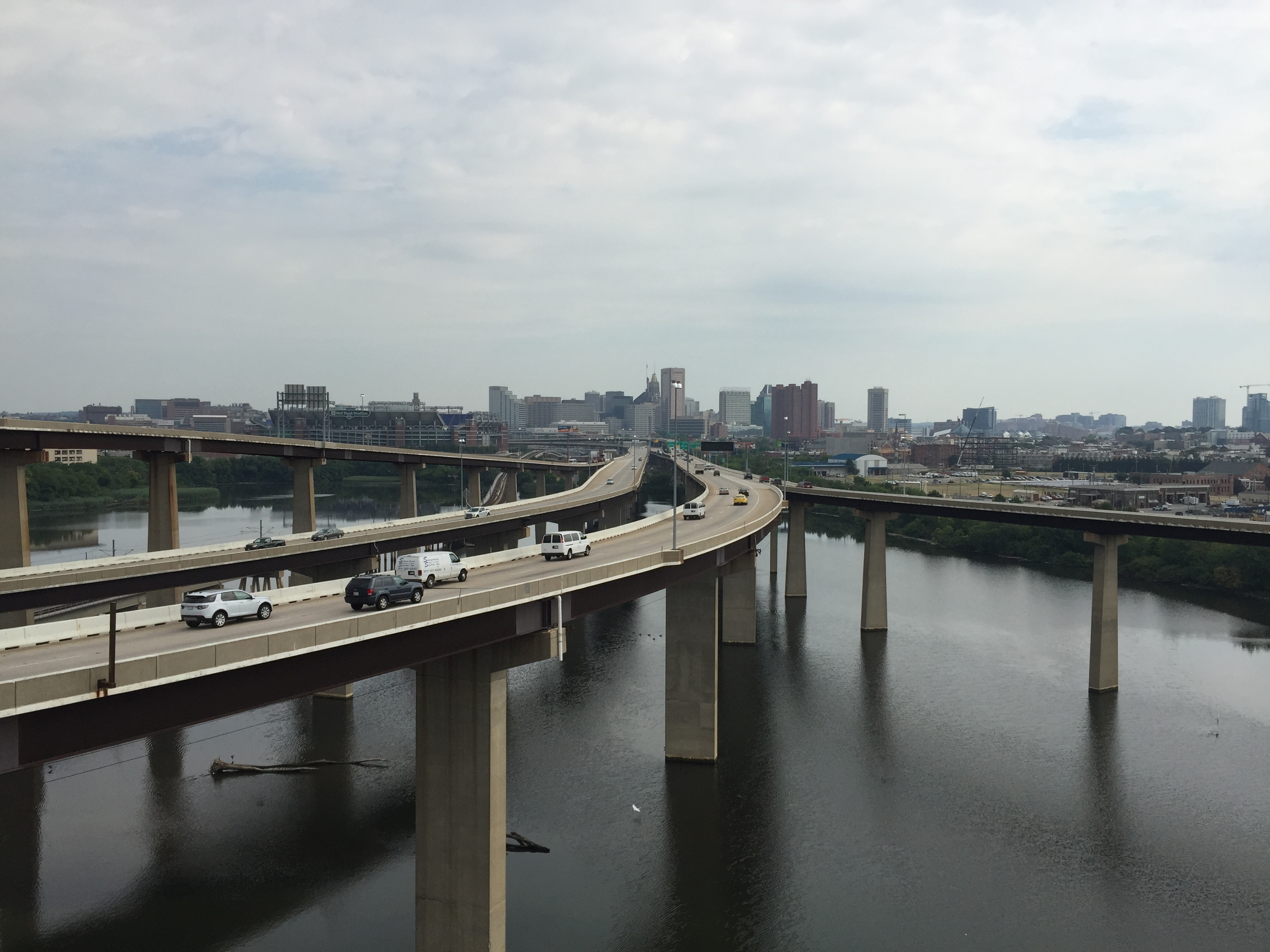
View north along I-395 from I-95 in Baltimore

East of the stadium, two-lane flyover ramps from northbound I-395 to Martin Luther King Jr. Boulevard and from the boulevard to southbound I-395 leave and join the mainline. I-395 curves to due north as a four-lane freeway that gains one additional lane in each direction as the viaduct ends and the highway approaches its signed, limited access terminus at Conway Street adjacent to Camden Station, the northern terminus of the Camden Line. The train station is just to the east of the Baltimore & Ohio Warehouse at Camden Yards, which is just to the east of the Oriole Park at Camden Yards. Conway Street heads east toward Light Street and the Inner Harbor. I-395 officially continues one block north along the western edge of the Baltimore Convention Center to a northern terminus at Camden Street adjacent to Sports Legends Museum at Camden Yards, which is in the Baltimore and Ohio Railroad's original Camden Station building. The roadway continues north as Howard Street through Downtown Baltimore.

== History ==
In 1969, the Design Concept Team, a multidiscipline group assembled in 1966 by the city government to help design freeway routings that would not disrupt the city's fabric, published the Baltimore 3-A Interstate and Boulevard System. In the 3-A system, I-395 was planned as a freeway spur from I-95 to the south edge of the central business district, connecting to a new route named Harbor City Boulevard (now known as Martin Luther King Jr. Boulevard). As routed in the 3-A System, I-95 would act as a bypass of the central business district, with I-395 providing direct access. On May 30, 2008, the Eastern Branch was officially dedicated for Cal Ripken Jr., the Hall of Fame baseball player who played for the Baltimore Orioles from 1981 to 2001 and was elected to the Baseball Hall of Fame in 2007. The Eastern Branch is now called Cal Ripken Way from I-95 to Conway Street.

== Exit list ==
The entire route is in Baltimore.

mi	km	Destinations	Notes
0.00	0.00	I-95 – Washington, New York	Southern terminus; directional T interchange on an overpass over the Patapsco River
		Patapsco River bridge	
0.53	0.85	Martin Luther King Jr. Boulevard north to Russell Street / Lee Street	Northbound exit and southbound entrance; unsigned I-395A
1.24	2.00	Conway Street east – Inner Harbor	Northbound at-grade intersection
1.33	2.14	Howard Street north – Downtown	Northern terminus
1.000 mi = 1.609 km; 1.000 km = 0.621 mi: Incomplete access

== Martin Luther King Jr. Boulevard ==
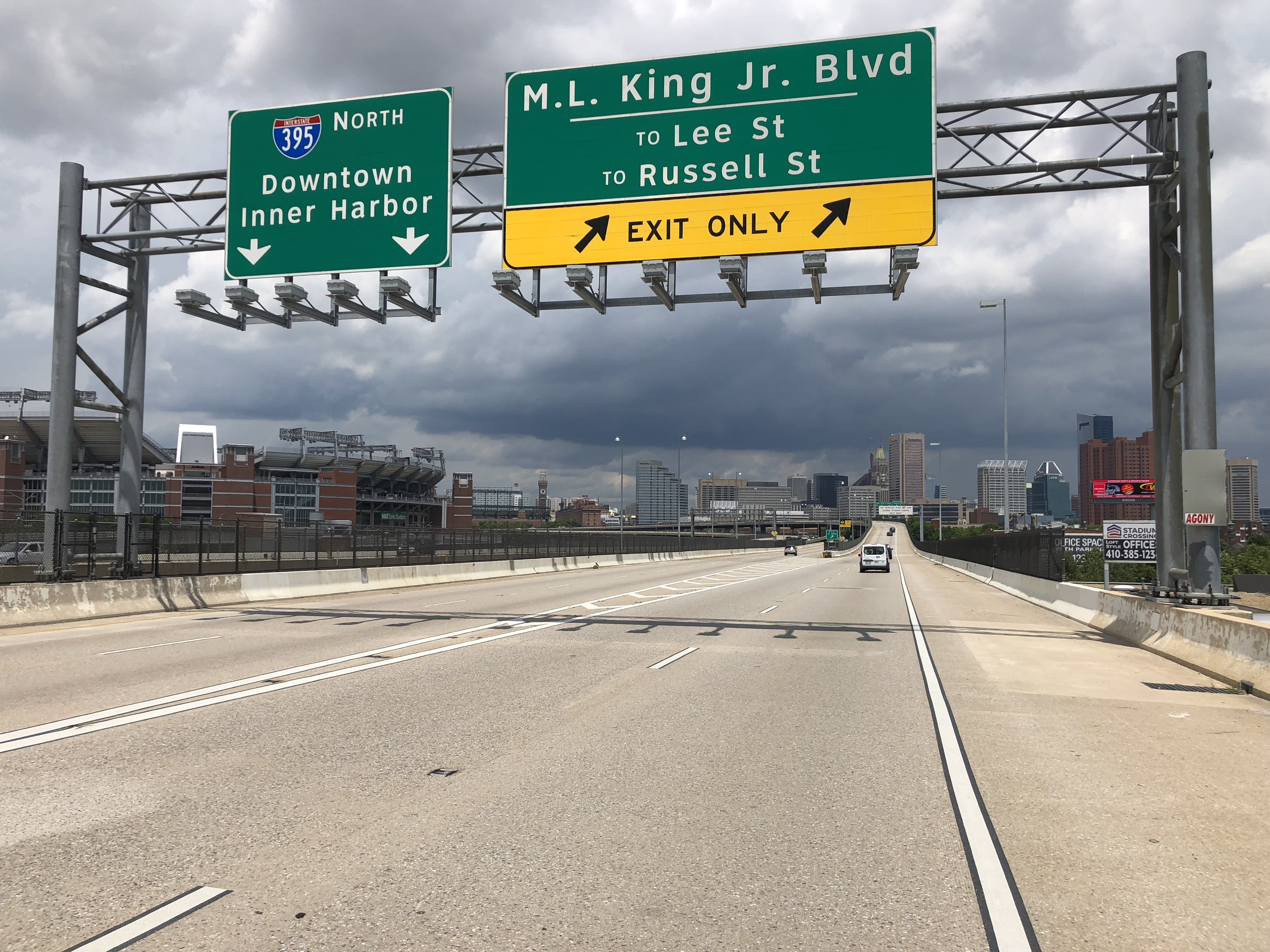
View north along I-395 at the exit for Martin Luther King Jr. Boulevard in Baltimore

Martin Luther King Jr. Boulevard
- Location: Baltimore
- Length: 2.5 mi (4.0 km)

Martin Luther King Jr. Boulevard, a related road, is a 2.5-mile (4.0 km) controlled-access boulevard that passes along the west side of Downtown Baltimore. The boulevard begins at a partial interchange with I-395 south of downtown and ends at Howard and Chase streets north of downtown. The first 0.65 miles (1.05 km) of Martin Luther King Jr. Boulevard, from I-395 to Russell Street, is unsigned I-395A and is maintained by MDTA. The remainder of the highway from Russell Street to Howard Street is maintained by the Baltimore City Department of Transportation. The boulevard is a part of the National Highway System between I-395 and US 40.

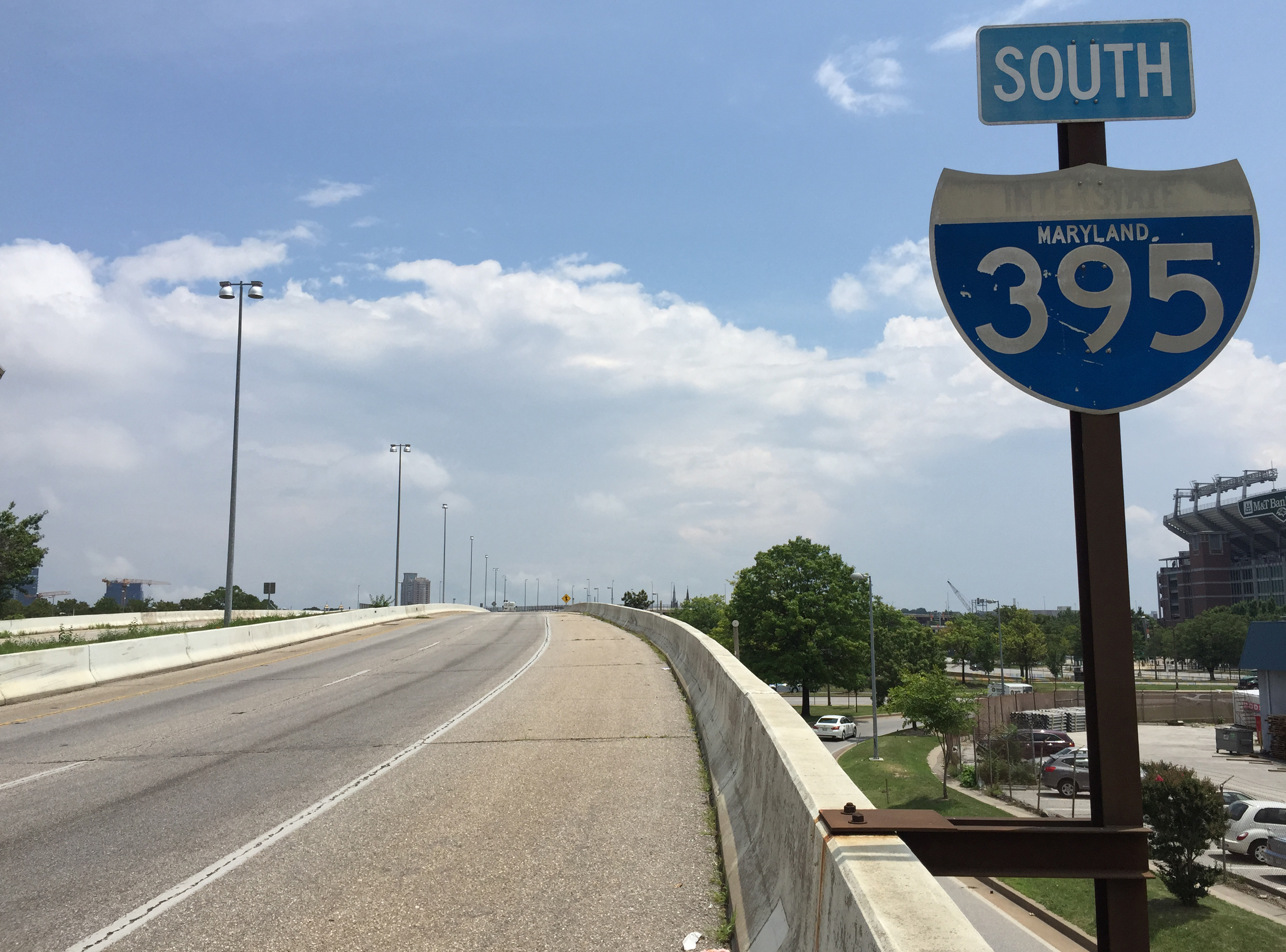
View south near the south end of Martin Luther King Jr. Boulevard near I-395 in Baltimore

Martin Luther King Jr. Boulevard begins as a pair of two-lane freeway ramps to and from southbound I-395 and northbound I-395, respectively. Before the northbound ramp crosses I-395, an exit ramp splits from the main flyover for Lee Street, which leads to Russell Street and parking for M&T Bank Stadium and the Oriole Park at Camden Yards. The boulevard curves to the west, crosses over the Baltimore Terminal Subdivision and Baltimore Light Rail lines, and passes between the two stadiums. Each direction of Martin Luther King Jr. Boulevard receives a ramp from northbound Russell Street before it crosses over the state highway. At the west end of the bridge over Russell Street, maintenance changes from state to city. The boulevard curves northwest and the southbound direction has an exit ramp for southbound Russell Street before the freeway section ends at a signalized intersection with Washington Boulevard.

Martin Luther King Jr. Boulevard continues as a six-lane controlled-access boulevard. The boulevard passes between the Pigtown neighborhood to the west and Ridgely's Delight on the east. The highway veers north at Lombard Street and passes along Old Saint Paul's Cemetery, which is adjacent to the University of Maryland, Baltimore, campus. Martin Luther King Jr. Boulevard has intersections with Franklin and Mulberry streets, which act as the ramps of a diamond interchange with a short freeway segment of US 40 that was formerly I-170. North of US 40, the boulevard passes Perkins Square Gazebo as it curves northeast. Martin Luther King Jr. Boulevard has intersections with Druid Hill Avenue and McCulloh Street, which form the southbound and northbound directions, respectively, of Maryland Route 129 (MD 129). The boulevard passes to the east of State Center, a collection of state office buildings, before intersecting Howard Street at the northern end of that street's integration with the Baltimore Light Rail. At Howard Street, Martin Luther King Jr. Boulevard splits into separate roadways that rejoin at their five-way intersection with Park Avenue, which is one-way northbound, and Chase Street, which is one-way westbound. The boulevard continues one more block to its official northern terminus next to the Joseph Meyerhoff Symphony Hall; this intersection's west leg is an east-heading disjoint segment of Park Avenue and its east leg is one-way eastbound Biddle Street (which is paired with the westbound-running Preston Street in this area).

The Martin Luther King Jr. Boulevard-initiated arterial route continues north along a four-lane undivided, two-block disjoint segment of Cathedral Street separate from the portion of Cathedral Street that complements Charles Street to the south. Cathedral Street reaches its northern terminus at an intersection with Mount Royal Avenue between the former Mount Royal Station of the Baltimore and Ohio Railroad to the west and the Lyric Performing Arts Center to the east. One direction of Mount Royal Avenue, a four-lane boulevard, heads east through the University of Baltimore campus before paralleling I-83 to its eastern terminus at Guilford Avenue. The arterial follows Mount Royal Avenue northwest, intersects the light rail at-grade, crosses over Howard Street, and passes along the northeast side of the Bolton Hill neighborhood. Mount Royal Avenue reaches its western terminus at US 1 and US 40 Truck (North Avenue) at their interchange with I-83 (Jones Falls Expressway). North of here, Mount Royal Terrace runs one way alongside the southbound side of I-83, between Druid Park Lake Drive and North Avenue; it is complemented by a northbound collector-distributor road on I-83 that connects to eastbound 28th Street and westbound Druid Park Lake Drive.
