= Baltimore and Potomac Tunnel =

Railroad tunnel near Baltimore, Maryland

Coordinates: 39.303°N 76.6352°W

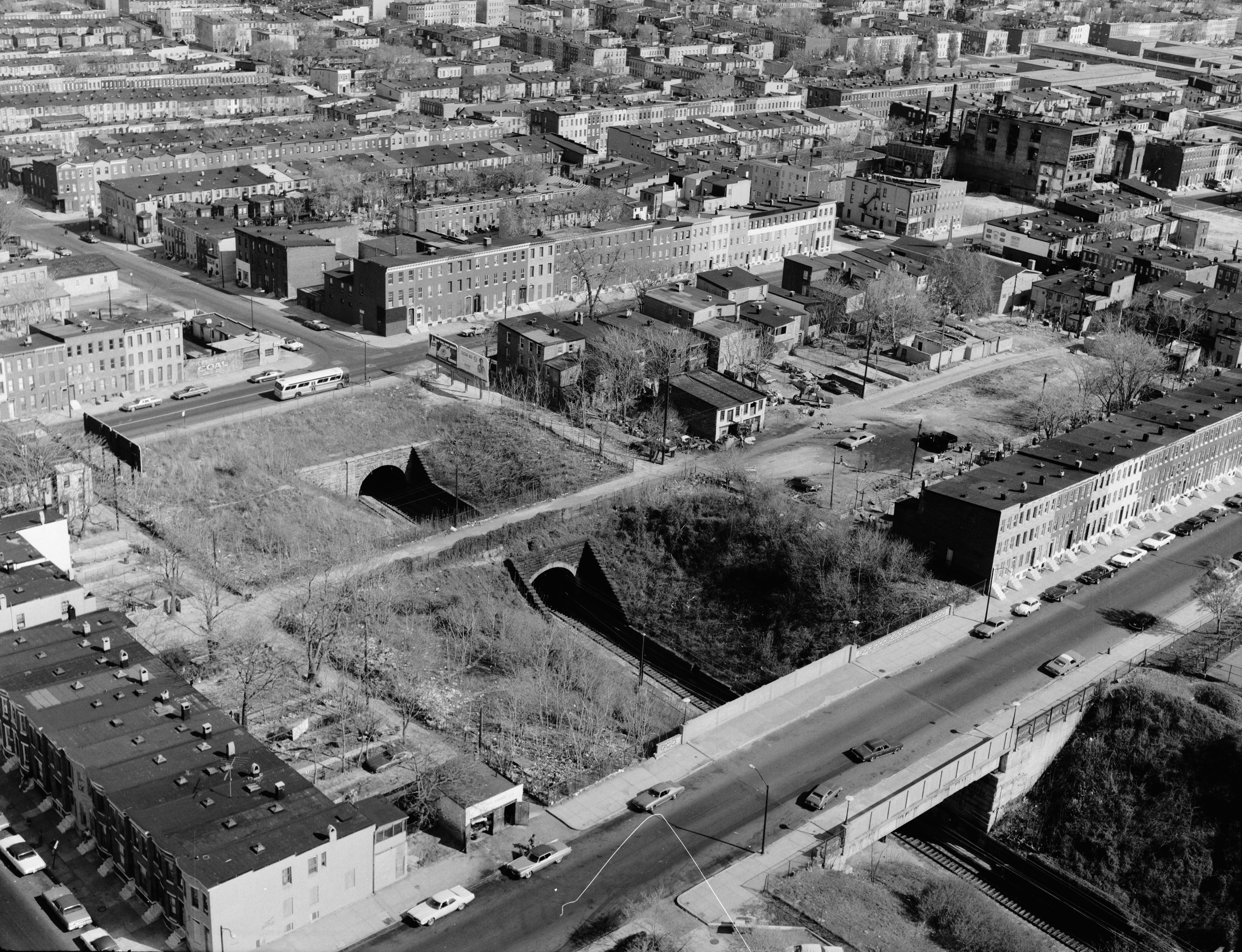
West portal of B&P Tunnel in 1977.

The Baltimore and Potomac Tunnel (or B&P Tunnel) is a double-tracked, masonry arch railroad tunnel on the Northeast Corridor in Baltimore, Maryland, just west of Pennsylvania Station (Baltimore). Opened in 1873, the tunnel is the oldest tunnel operated by Amtrak. In 2008, the tunnel was used by about 140 Amtrak and MARC passenger trains and two freight trains every day.

The 7,669-foot (2,338 m) tunnel, which passes under the Baltimore neighborhoods of Bolton Hill, Madison Park, and Upton, is a single tube with two tracks. It is punctuated by two open-air cuts for ventilation of exhaust fumes and smoke—Pennsylvania Avenue Opening and John Street Opening—that divide the main tunnel into three "sub-tunnels", designated (from south to north) Gilmor Street Tunnel, Wilson Street Tunnel, and John Street Tunnel.

== History and operations ==
Constructed by the Baltimore and Potomac Railroad under Winchester Street and Wilson Street in Baltimore, the tunnel opened on June 29, 1873. The construction of the tunnel required 13 million bricks and the waste dirt was used to shore up several areas of the city allowing for the construction of more homes and buildings. The B&P tunnel allowed the Pennsylvania Railroad (PRR) direct access to Washington, D.C., for the first time by connecting its Northern Central Railway affiliate, which arrived in Baltimore from the north, to the Baltimore and Potomac's new spur, which ran to Washington, D.C.

Between 1916 and 1917, the PRR expanded the tunnel to accommodate larger trains. The railroad lowered the tunnel floor about 2 1/2 feet (0.76 m), underpinned the side walls, installed a concrete invert slab, and rebuilt the track structure. The bases of the tunnel walls were chipped away to improve horizontal clearance.

Before the PRR electrified its New York City–Washington main line in 1935, the poorly ventilated tunnel filled with smoke from steam locomotives. The smoke also was a nuisance to the residential neighborhoods above the tunnel.

In preparation for the electrified operation, the tunnel was lined with gunite to waterproof the arch and prevent icicles from shorting out the catenary wires.

Financial considerations prevented the PRR from constructing a new passenger tunnel on the Presstman Street alignment, for which it previously had acquired rights. The PRR's plan had envisioned using the new Presstman Street tunnel and the original bores of the Union Tunnel for passenger operations, while the old B&P Tunnel and the newer bores of the Union Tunnel (completed in the 1930s) would have been used for freight operations.

In the late 1950s, the tunnel became a hindrance to the growth of PRR's Trailer-on-Train service, which required additional vertical and horizontal clearance to accommodate semi-trailers on top of railroad flatcars. The curve at Pennsylvania Avenue was the biggest constraint. The PRR modified the tunnel walls and ceiling for a distance of 2,200 feet (670 m) to improve clearance and enable high cars and piggyback trailers to traverse the tunnel without damaging their roofs. Additionally, a 928-foot (283 m) gauntlet track was installed on southbound Track 3 to shift trains 17 inches (430 mm) closer to the middle of the tunnel. However, the gauntlet track effectively created a single-track tunnel: trains could not use Track 2 while a train was using the gauntlet track, and if a train using the gauntlet track became disabled, the tunnel would be shut down until the disabled train was moved. In addition, even with the gauntlet track, the tunnel could not accommodate cars that were taller than 16 feet 3 inches (4.95 m) or exceeded the Plate C loading gauge.

In the early 1980s, the tunnel underwent rehabilitation as part of the Northeast Corridor Improvement Project. The repairs included replacing the existing invert, repairing the tunnel lining, upgrading the track structure, installing a new gauntlet track, and rehabilitating the tunnel drainage system. No fundamental change was made in the tunnel's difficult geometry. Eventually, the gauntlet track was removed, due to freight traffic largely shifting to the ex-Baltimore and Ohio route through the Howard Street Tunnel.

== Problems ==
The tunnel has long been one of the worst bottlenecks for rail traffic along the Northeast Corridor and its maintenance is costly:

- A sharp curve at the south portal of the tunnel limits southbound trains to 30 mph (48 km/h)
- The spacing between tracks is tight
- There are water infiltration and drainage issues
- A mile-long, 1.34 percent grade—the steepest grade on the NEC between Philadelphia and Washington—further constrains train performance

Collectively, the tunnel's height, speed, and capacity limitations threaten the ability for the Port of Baltimore to be competitive with increased shipping volumes.

== Plans for improvements ==
In June 2008, the U.S. House of Representatives voted to support a study of the environmental impacts of different possible replacement tunnels. On January 28, 2010, $60 million in funding was awarded under the American Recovery and Reinvestment Act to conduct the study, but not the money that would be required for a replacement tunnel. Estimates in 2013 put the cost around $1.5 billion.

An outgrowth of the ARRA funds, the B&P Tunnel Project was an environmental and engineering study by the FRA, MDOT, and Amtrak to evaluate potential improvements to the tunnel. The study held multiple open houses in 2014–2015 to share information and solicit public input.

=== Preliminary alternatives ===
In December 2014, the study published the Preliminary Alternatives Screening Report, in which four alternatives from 16 were selected to be carried forward for further consideration and study:

- Alternative 1, No Build: do nothing
- Alternative 2, Rebuild/Rehabilitate: improve the existing tunnel to either eliminate the need for a new tunnel or complement a new tunnel
- Alternative 3, Great Circle Passenger Tunnel: construct a new 10,900-foot (3,300 m) tunnel on a wide, continuous arc to the north of the existing tunnel, bypassing it entirely
- Alternative 11, Robert Street South: construct a new 9,500 feet (2,900 m) tunnel roughly parallel to and within 2–4 blocks of the existing tunnel

Among the criteria used to evaluate the alternatives was the ability to accommodate double-stack container cars. The 12 eliminated alternatives included several that varied greatly from the existing alignment and bypassed Pennsylvania Station entirely (including one using the former I-170 right of way), as well as several that reused one or more of the three existing tunnel sections.

=== Selected alternative ===
In November 2016, Alternative 3B (Great Circle) was chosen as the preferred alternative in the Final Environmental Impact Statement (FEIS) over Alternative 1 (No Build) and two other variations of the Great Circle Alternative (Alternatives 3A and 3C). Highlights of Alternative 3B are:

- A design that permits a maximum speed of over 100 mph (160 km/h), up from 30 mph (48 km/h) for the existing tunnel.
- A total cost (including engineering, design, and construction) of $4.52 billion.
- A total project length of 3.67 mi (5.91 km), including a 2 mi (3.2 km) tunnel with four single-track tubes.
- Three diesel exhaust ventilation facilities.
- Approximately 2:30 in travel time savings for Amtrak trains and 1:50 for MARC trains, compared to the existing tunnel.
- Reconstruction of the West Baltimore MARC Station with high-level platforms.
- Displacement of 22 residences and six businesses.

The Federal Railroad Administration released its Record of Decision on the new tunnel, the final step in the NEPA process, in March 2017.

=== Final plan ===
In June 2021, Amtrak and Maryland announced that they would be moving forward with design and construction of the new tunnel, albeit with several significant changes from the previously announced plan (Alternative 3B):

- The number of single-track tubes is reduced from four to two; the third and fourth single-track tubes could be constructed in the future if funding becomes available.
- The design is revised to only accommodate electric trains, requiring the MARC Penn Line to be converted from a mix of diesel and electric locomotives to all-electric power.
- The project is revised to remove the ability to accommodate double-stack freight trains in the new tunnel and instead maintains the B&P Tunnel for use by diesel powered freight trains.

The changes were made to reduce the project's cost by $1 billion and to address concerns about diesel exhaust fumes from communities near the ventilation facilities. The changes did not trigger the need for a new Environmental Impact Statement.

=== Replacement tunnel ===
The new tunnel, which will be named for Frederick Douglass, is scheduled to open in 2035. Amtrak started the process to procure construction services in June 2022. On January 30, 2023, President Joe Biden visited the tunnel to kick off the project and promote the $1 trillion Infrastructure Investment and Jobs Act (IIJA). Biden, who had taken "a thousand trips" through the tunnel on Amtrak between Wilmington and Washington during his time as Senator from Delaware, remarked that "you wonder how in the hell [the B&P Tunnel] is still standing". Amtrak was awarded $4.7 billion in Infrastructure Investment and Jobs Act funds in November 2023. Amtrak and Maryland MTA will contribute an additional $1.2 billion. Amtrak awarded a construction contract to the Kiewit/J. F. Shea Joint Venture in February 2024 and demolition of several buildings began later that month.

== See also ==
- Pennsylvania Station (Baltimore)
- Union Tunnel (Baltimore)
- Howard Street Tunnel, another rail tunnel under Baltimore that's part of the former Baltimore Belt Line.
