= Queen Lane station =

SEPTA train station in Philadelphia, Pennsylvania, United States

Queen Lane
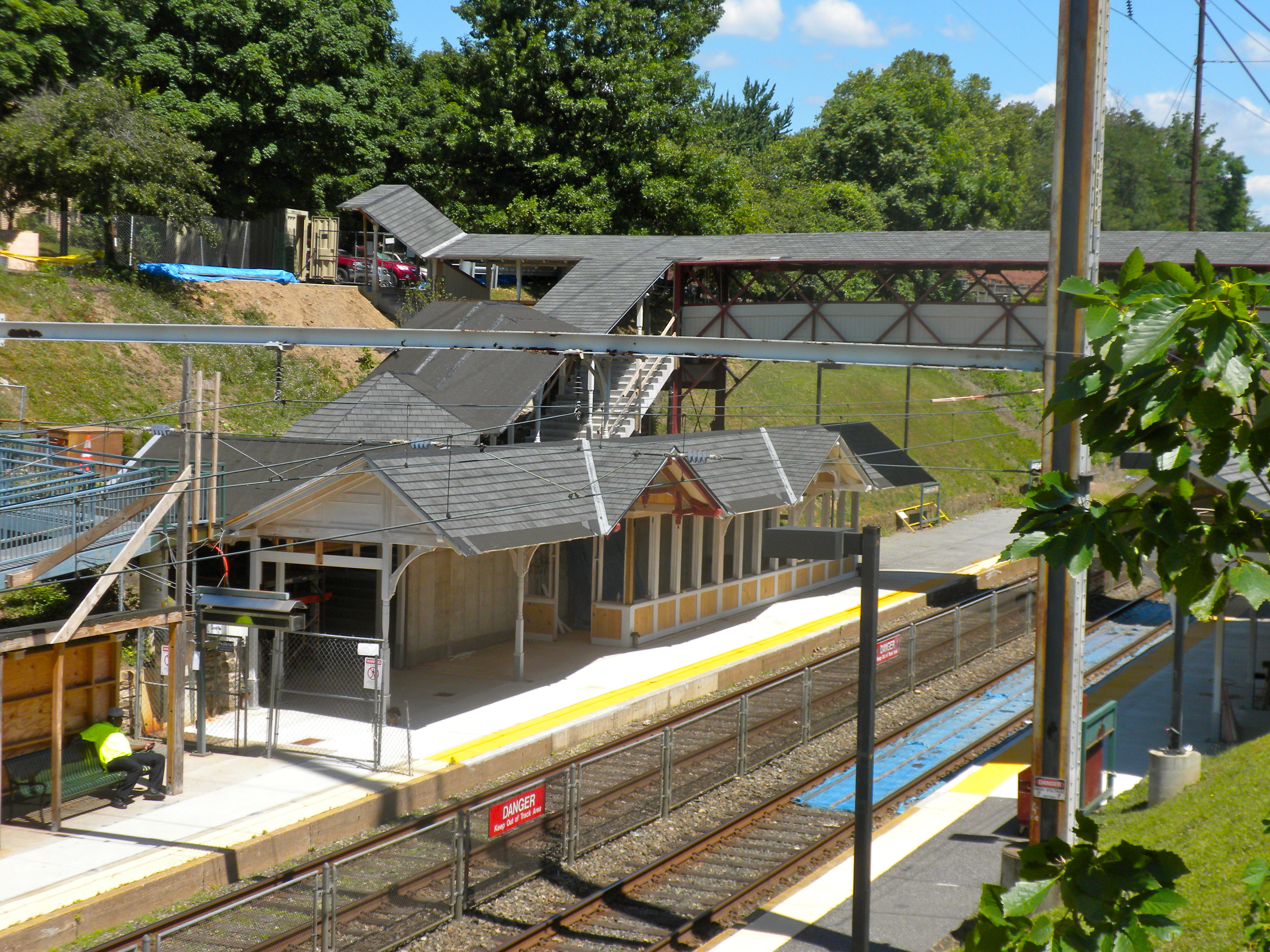
- Queen Lane station, as seen from above

General information
- Location: Queen Lane & Wissahickon Avenue; Philadelphia, Pennsylvania
- Coordinates: 40°01′24″N 75°10′41″W
- Owner: Southeastern Pennsylvania Transportation Authority
- Line: Chestnut Hill West Branch
- Platforms: 2 side platforms
- Tracks: 2
- Connections: SEPTA City Bus: K

Construction
- Parking: 56 spaces
- Cycle facilities: 2 rack spaces
- Accessible: Yes

Other information
- Fare zone: 1

History
- Electrified: March 22, 1918

Passengers
- 2017: 427 boardings, 352 alightings (weekday average)
- Rank: 58 of 146

Services
Preceding station	SEPTA	Following station
Chelten Avenue toward Chestnut Hill West	Chestnut Hill West Line	North Philadelphia toward Temple University
Former services
Preceding station	Pennsylvania Railroad	Following station
Chelten Avenue toward Chestnut Hill	Chestnut Hill Line	Westmoreland toward Suburban Station
Chelten Avenue toward White Marsh	Fort Washington Branch	Westmoreland toward Suburban Station
Location

Queen Lane station is a SEPTA Regional Rail station in Philadelphia, Pennsylvania. Located at 5319 Wissahickon Avenue facing West Queen Lane, it serves the Chestnut Hill West Line.

The station is 7.4 miles (11.9 km) from Suburban Station. In 2004, this station saw 470 boardings on an average weekday. It was built for the Philadelphia, Germantown and Chestnut Hill Railroad, a subsidiary of the Pennsylvania Railroad, in 1885 to a design by Washington Bleddyn Powell.
