= Union Tunnel (Baltimore) =

Tunnel on Amtrak's Northeast Corridor in Baltimore

The Union Tunnel is a railroad tunnel on Amtrak's Northeast Corridor in Baltimore, Maryland adjacent to Pennsylvania Station that was built to connect the Pennsylvania Railroad's original mainline to Philadelphia, Pennsylvania and points north. The tunnel consists of two parallel bores: the original bore from 1873 has a single track, while a newer bore from 1934 has two tracks.

== Original tunnel ==
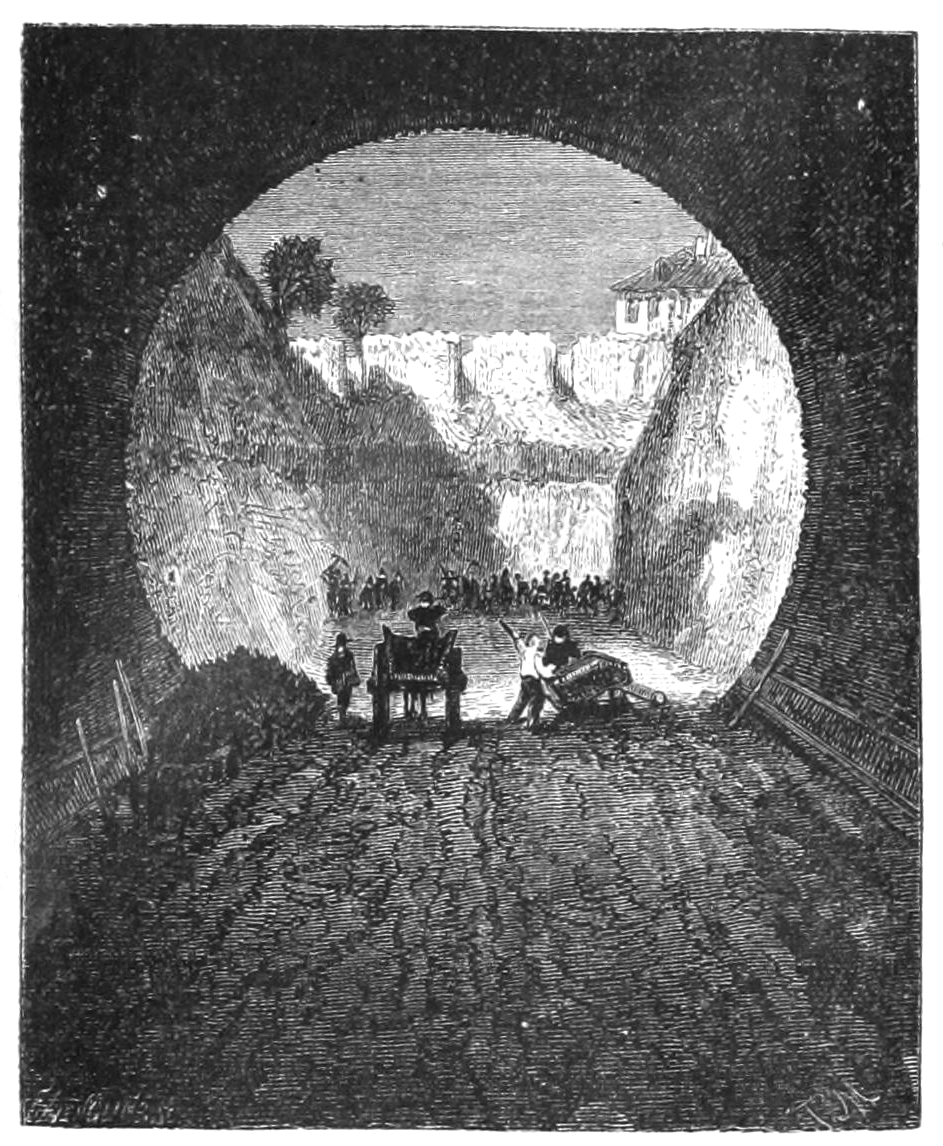
The tunnel and cutting under construction in 1872

The Union Tunnel was originally constructed as part of the Union Railroad and served as the northern and eastern approach to Calvert Street Station. In all, the Union Railroad was 9.62 miles (15.48 km) in length, extending from the northern terminus of the Baltimore and Potomac Railroad (B&P) and the southern terminus of the Northern Central Railway(NCRY) to the southern terminus of the Philadelphia, Wilmington & Baltimore Railroad. It connected with the B&P and the NCRY at the Calvert Street Station, since replaced by the current Pennsylvania Station, near the northern portal of the Baltimore and Potomac Tunnel. The Union Railroad joined the Northern Central at Bayview Junction, Maryland 39.29677°N 76.5533°W on the northeast side of Baltimore. It also included a spur from just west of Bayview Junction that went due South to Canton.

In 1866 the Canton Company of Baltimore obtained a charter from State of Maryland to build the Union Railroad. Active steps to finance construction of the railroad and tunnel came only in the autumn of 1870, and actual construction began on May 1, 1871. On July 24, 1873, the first train passed through the tunnel. The original tunnel began at Bond Street, and passed under the bed of Hoffman Street to Greenmount Avenue, crossing under Dallas, Caroline, Spring and Eden Streets, Central and Harford Avenues, and Ensor, Valley and McKim Streets. Its length is 3,410 feet (1,040 m). The total cost of the road and tunnel was some $3,000,000.

As soon as the Union Railroad was completed, the Northern Central Railway obtained the right to use it, and in February, 1882, the Northern Central purchased the Union Railroad stock from the Canton Company, and assumed control March 1 of the same year.

== Modifications ==
Additional work was done on the tunnels between 1928 and 1935 to prepare for the electrification of the Pennsylvania Railroad's New York-Washington mainline. The original Union Tunnel, too small to accommodate overhead catenary on its two tracks, was supplemented by an adjacent double-track tunnel to the east, then converted to a single track which provided adequate clearance for electrification.

== See also ==
- Howard Street Tunnel, another tunnel under Baltimore that's part of the Baltimore Belt Line.
