= CityLink Blue (BaltimoreLink) =

Bus route in Baltimore

- CMS - Johns Hopkins Bayview
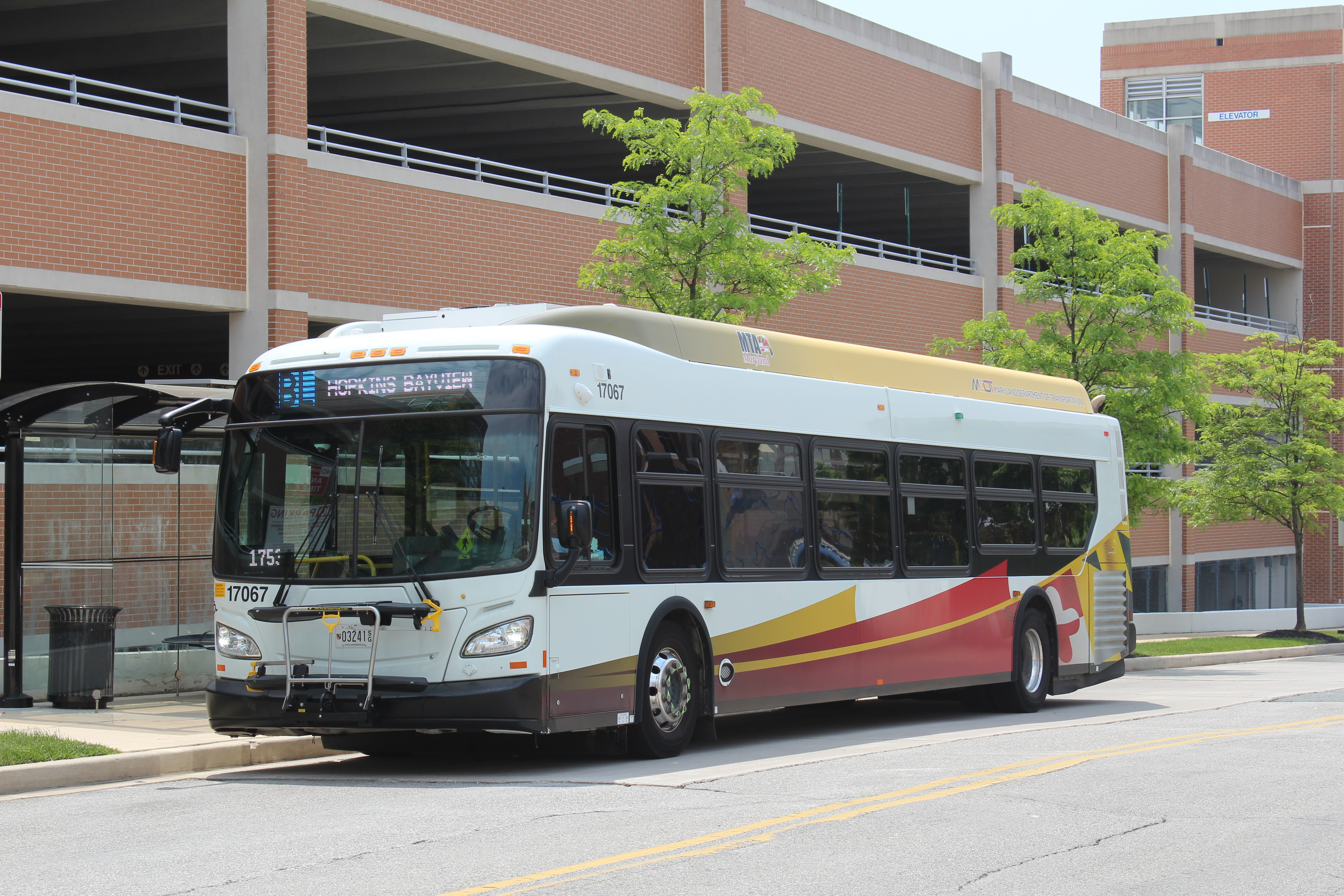
- Bus on CityLink Blue route

Overview
- System: MTA BaltimoreLink
- Status: Active
- Predecessors: Route 15, Route 23, QuickBus 40

Route
- Locale: Baltimore City; Baltimore County
- Landmarks served: Centers for Medicare & Medicaid Services; Security Square Mall; Social Security Administration; West Baltimore station Lexington Market (Light Rail, Metro Subway); Mercy Medical Center (Baltimore, Maryland); City Hall; Phoenix Shot Tower (Metro Subway); Dunbar High School; Johns Hopkins Bayview Medical Center
- Start: Johns Hopkins Bayview
- Via: Fayette Street, Franklin-Mulberry Expressway, Edmonson Avenue, Security Boulevard
- End: Westgate / CMS
- Length: 14.2 miles (22.9 km)

Service
- Frequency: Frequent Daily Service / 24 hours
- Ridership: 1,941,856 (2022)

CityLink Blue (abbreviated BL) is a bus route operated by the Maryland Transit Administration between the Bayview and Westgate sections of Baltimore, or Woodlawn, Baltimore County.

Most westbound trips on the route depart from Johns Hopkins Bayview Medical Center, at the intersection of East Lombard Street and Bioscience Drive in East Baltimore, and terminate at the Centers for Medicare & Medicaid Services (CMS) on Security Boulevard in Woodlawn. Some trips on late nights on weekdays or throughout the day on weekends terminate instead at the North Bend Loop by the intersection of Edmondson Avenue and North Bend Road, near the western boundary of Baltimore City. Eastbound trips travel the reverse route between these terminal stops; likewise, most of these trips depart from the CMS stop, but some depart from the North Bend Loop stop.

The CityLink Blue route runs along a largely similar path to that of the planned Red Line east-west light rail line, which was cancelled by Governor Larry Hogan in June 2015.

In August 2026, construction began to install bus lanes along the route of the proposed Red Line to improve service on the CityLink Orange, CityLink Blue, and QuickLink 40 routes.
