= Tulpehocken station =

SEPTA train station in Germantown, Philadelphia, Pennsylvania, United States

Tulpehocken
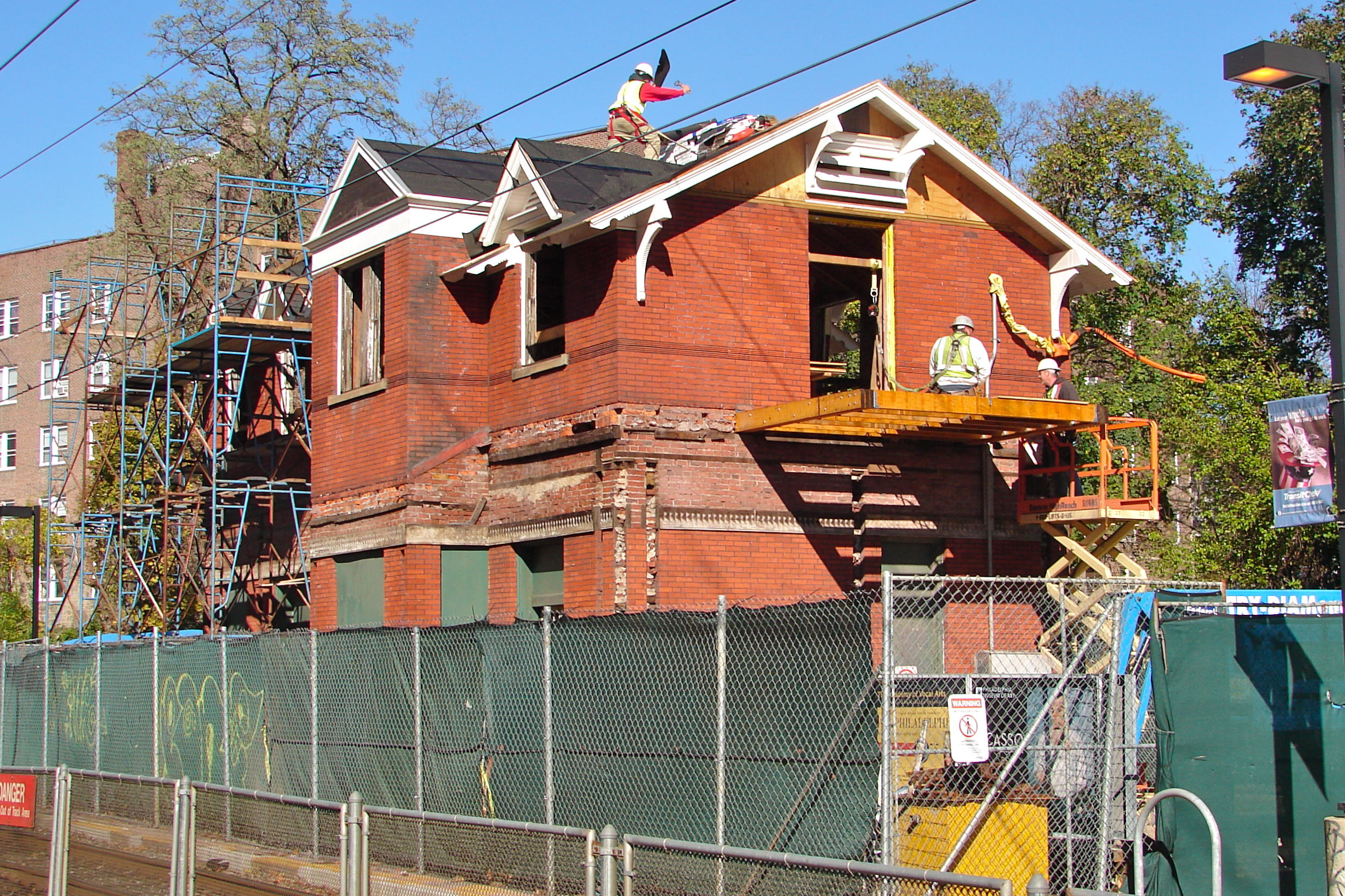
- The station at Tulpehocken in 2010, during restoration

General information
- Location: 333 West Tulpehocken Street; Germantown, Philadelphia, Pennsylvania
- Coordinates: 40°2′6.36″N 75°11′12.48″W
- Owner: SEPTA
- Line: Chestnut Hill West Branch
- Platforms: 2 side platforms
- Tracks: 2
- Connections: SEPTA City Bus: 53, 65

Construction
- Parking: 35
- Accessible: No

Other information
- Fare zone: 2

History
- Electrified: March 22, 1918; 108 years ago
- Former names: Walnut Lane

Services
| Preceding station | SEPTA | Following station |
|---|---|---|
| Upsal toward Chestnut Hill West | Chestnut Hill West Line | Chelten Avenue toward Temple University |
Former services
| Preceding station | Pennsylvania Railroad | Following station |
|---|---|---|
| Upsal toward Chestnut Hill | Chestnut Hill Line | Chelten Avenue toward Suburban Station |
| Upsal toward White Marsh | Fort Washington Branch | Chelten Avenue toward Suburban Station |
- Tulpehocken Station Historic District
- U.S. National Register of Historic Places
- U.S. Historic district – Contributing property
- Philadelphia Register of Historic Places
- Interactive map of Tulpehocken Station Historic District
- Location: Germantown, Philadelphia; Pennsylvania, USA
- Coordinates: 40°2′6.36″N 75°11′12.48″W
- Architectural style: Late Victorian
- NRHP reference No.: 85003564
- Added to NRHP: November 26, 1985
Location

Tulpehocken station is a SEPTA Regional Rail station in Philadelphia, Pennsylvania. Located at 333 West Tulpehocken Street in the Germantown neighborhood, it serves the Chestnut Hill West Line. The station is in Zone 1 on the Chestnut Hill West Line, and is 8.5 track miles from Suburban Station. In 2004, this station saw 176 boardings on an average weekday.

== History ==
The Philadelphia, Germantown and Chestnut Hill Railroad, a Pennsylvania Railroad-affiliated company, opened the Chestnut Hill West Branch on June 11, 1884. The original station building dates to approximately 1885.
