= Chelten Avenue station =

SEPTA train station in Germantown, Philadelphia, Pennsylvania, United States

Chelten Avenue
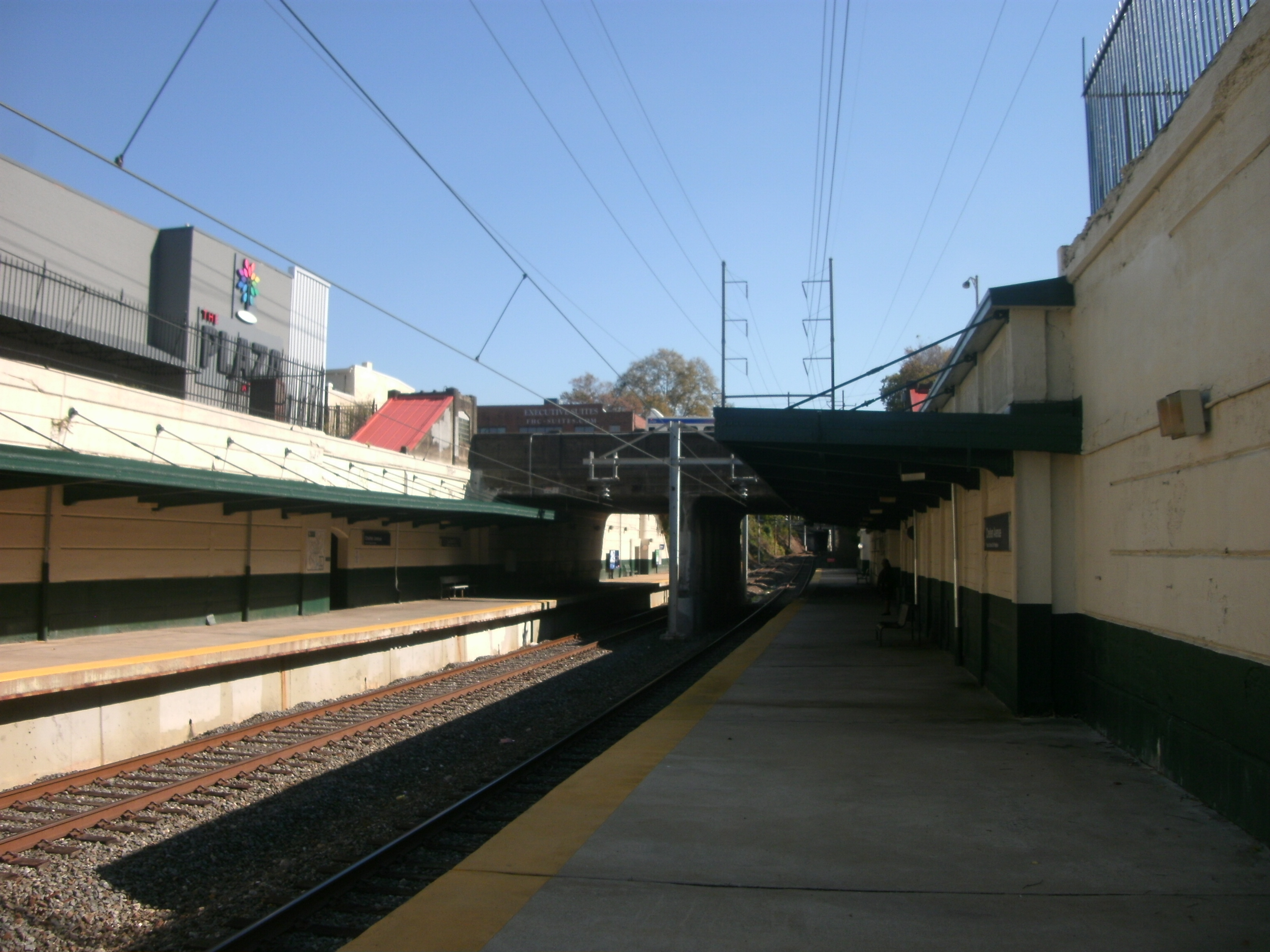
- Chelten Avenue station, facing the Chelten Avenue bridge in October 2012

General information
- Location: 359 West Chelten Avenue; Philadelphia, Pennsylvania
- Coordinates: 40°01′48″N 75°10′52″W
- Owner: Southeastern Pennsylvania Transportation Authority
- Line: Chestnut Hill West Branch
- Platforms: 2 side platforms
- Tracks: 2
- Connections: SEPTA City Bus: 26, 41

Construction
- Parking: 24 spaces
- Cycle facilities: 10 rack spaces
- Accessible: No

Other information
- Fare zone: 1

History
- Opened: June 11, 1884
- Rebuilt: 1915
- Electrified: March 22, 1918

Passengers
- 2017: 359 boardings, 307 alightings (weekday average)
- Rank: 75 of 146

Services
Preceding station	SEPTA	Following station
Tulpehocken toward Chestnut Hill West	Chestnut Hill West Line	Queen Lane toward Temple University
Former services
Preceding station	Pennsylvania Railroad	Following station
Tulpehocken toward Chestnut Hill	Chestnut Hill Line	Queen Lane toward Suburban Station
Tulpehocken toward White Marsh	Fort Washington Branch	Queen Lane toward Suburban Station
Location

Chelten Avenue station is a SEPTA Regional Rail station in Philadelphia, Pennsylvania. Located on West Chelten Avenue in the Germantown neighborhood, it serves the Chestnut Hill West Line. The concrete station structure, part of a Pennsylvania Railroad grade-separation project completed in 1918 in conjunction with electrification of the line, was designed by William Holmes Cookman.

A station has been at this location since June 11, 1884. Known initially as Germantown, the 1918 station was named Chelten Avenue to avoid confusion with the Philadelphia & Reading Railroad's Germantown. The original station building was a two-story stone structure at street level on the outbound side. Retained in that general location after the 1918 grade separation, it was demolished circa 1958, replaced by a small brick ticket office on the inbound side which remains in use today.

The station is in zone 1 on the Chestnut Hill West Line, on former PRR tracks, and is 8.1 miles (13.0 km) from Suburban Station. It contains concrete-arch-covered staircases on all four corners of the Chelten Avenue Bridge over the tracks leading to the station platforms. In 2004, this station saw 441 boardings on an average weekday. Despite having high-level platforms, the station is not ADA accessible, as it lacks ramps or elevators from the street down to the platform level.
