= Westgate, Baltimore =

Westgate
- neighborhood statistical area
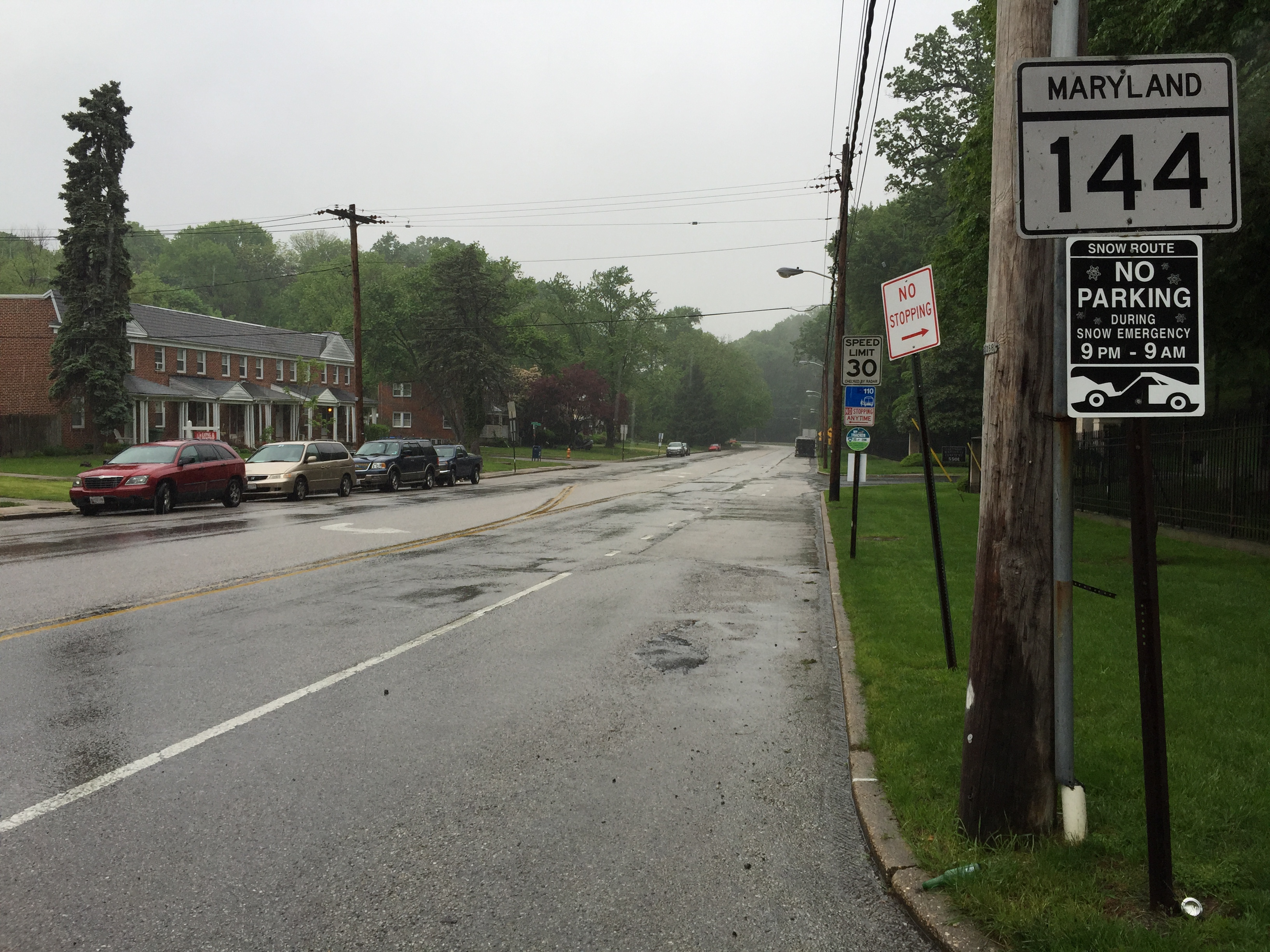
- The 5500 block of Frederick Avenue and its rowhouses (on the left) in the Westgate section of Baltimore

- Location within Baltimore
- Coordinates: 39°17′18.86″N 76°42′26.64″W
- Country: United States
- State: Maryland
- City: Baltimore

Area
  - Total: 0.433 sq mi (1.12 km^{2})
  - Land: 0.433 sq mi (1.12 km^{2})
- Elevation: 480 ft (150 m)

Population (2009)
  - Total: 2,841
  - Density: 6,560/sq mi (2,530/km^{2})
- Time zone: UTC-5 (Eastern)
  - Summer (DST): UTC-4 (EDT)
- ZIP Code: 21229
- Area code: 410, 443, and 667

Westgate is a neighborhood in the Southwest District of Baltimore, located between Baltimore County (west) and the city neighborhood of Ten Hills (east). Its boundaries are marked by Baltimore National Pike (north), Frederick Avenue (south), Rock Glen Avenue and Edmondson Avenue (east) and the city line (west).

Before the start of trolley service between Ellicott City and Baltimore along Edmondson Avenue in 1899, this area was mostly undeveloped. A stream feeding the Maiden Choice Run flowed along the course where Rock Glen Road was eventually built. With easy access created by the trolley, construction of houses began in the northern portion of the neighborhood in 1913. Most of the neighborhoods homes, a mix of bungalows, colonials, Cape Cods and Tudor-style houses, were completed in the 1920s and 1930s.

The community popularly known as Westgate overlaps the city line, covering a portion of Baltimore County. Homeowners in the Baltimore County neighborhood formerly known as Meridale Farms voted, in the 1930s, to become part of a single community association by the name of Westgate. However, the neighborhood drawn by official city maps ends at the limit of the last annexation of the city in 1918, near the intersection of North Bend Road and Edmondson Avenue.

== Demographics ==
The population of Westgate is approximately 2/3 black and 1/3 white. Its residents enjoy a median family income estimated in 2009 at $58,376, significantly higher than the citywide median of $38,772. Only 8.6 percent of Westgate families lived on incomes below the poverty level, compared with a citywide average of 22.8 percent.

== Public transportation ==
Three local transit buses provide service in the Westgate neighborhood.

- CityLink Purple (BaltimoreLink) operates along Frederick Avenue at the southern boundary of Westgate, providing service between Catonsville and Downtown Baltimore.
- CityLink Orange (BaltimoreLink) runs along Edmondson Avenue, at the northern edge of the neighborhood, providing service between Catonsville, to the west of the city in Baltimore County, and Essex, Maryland, to the east of the city.
- CityLink Blue (BaltimoreLink) runs from the North Bend loop in Westgate on Edmondson Avenue to Cold Spring Lane in the Northeast District of Baltimore.

== See also ==
- List of Baltimore neighborhoods
