= William Holmes Cookman =

American architect

William Holmes Cookman (1867–1950) was an American architect who worked as an engineer on the Pennsylvania Railroad from about 1894 to the 1930s. Cookman graduated from the University of Pennsylvania in 1887. Throughout his life, Cookman wore many different hats. From 1187 to 1890, he was listed in the Philadelphia city directories as a salesman or an artist, then from 1891 to 1893 as a draftsman. From 1894 through 1930 he was listed as an architect and by 1901 he began working for the Pennsylvania Railroad. He became a member of the Philadelphia Chapter of the American Institute of Architects in 1912. Cookman was a member of the American Railway Engineering Association, and served on the Association's Standing Committee VI. Buildings in 1914.

== Works ==
- Chester Transit Center, 6th & Welsh Streets, Chester, Pennsylvania, 1903
- Pennsylvania Railroad Station, Dover, Delaware, 1911
- Greensburg Station, Harrison Avenue and Seton Hill Drive, Greensburg, Pennsylvania,1912
- Pennsylvania Railroad North Philadelphia Station, Philadelphia (remodel, 1912)
- Cumberland Valley Railroad station and office building, Chambersburg, Pennsylvania
- Pennsylvania Railroad Edmondson Station, Edmondson Avenue at North Bentalou Street, Baltimore, Maryland
- Pennsylvania Railroad Chelten Avenue Station, Chelten Avenue and Pulaski Street, Philadelphia, Pennsylvania,1918, demolished and replaced 1958
- Pennsylvania Railroad Station, Mayville, New York, 1925
- Pennsylvania Railroad South Philadelphia Perishable Products Terminal Building, Oregon and South Delaware Avenues, South Philadelphia, Pennsylvania, 1928

== Gallery ==
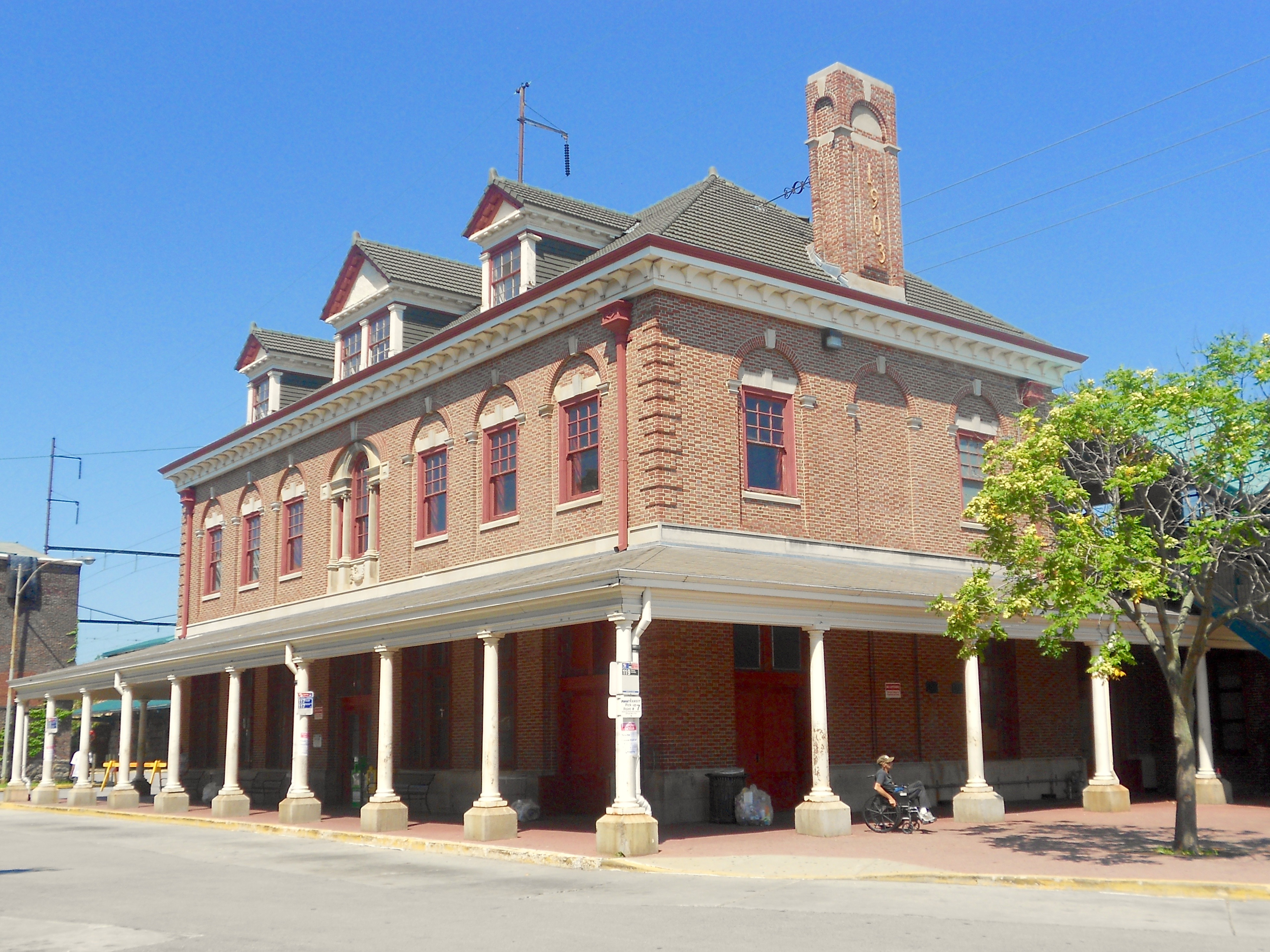
Pennsylvania Railroad station (SEPTA), Chester, Pennsylvania

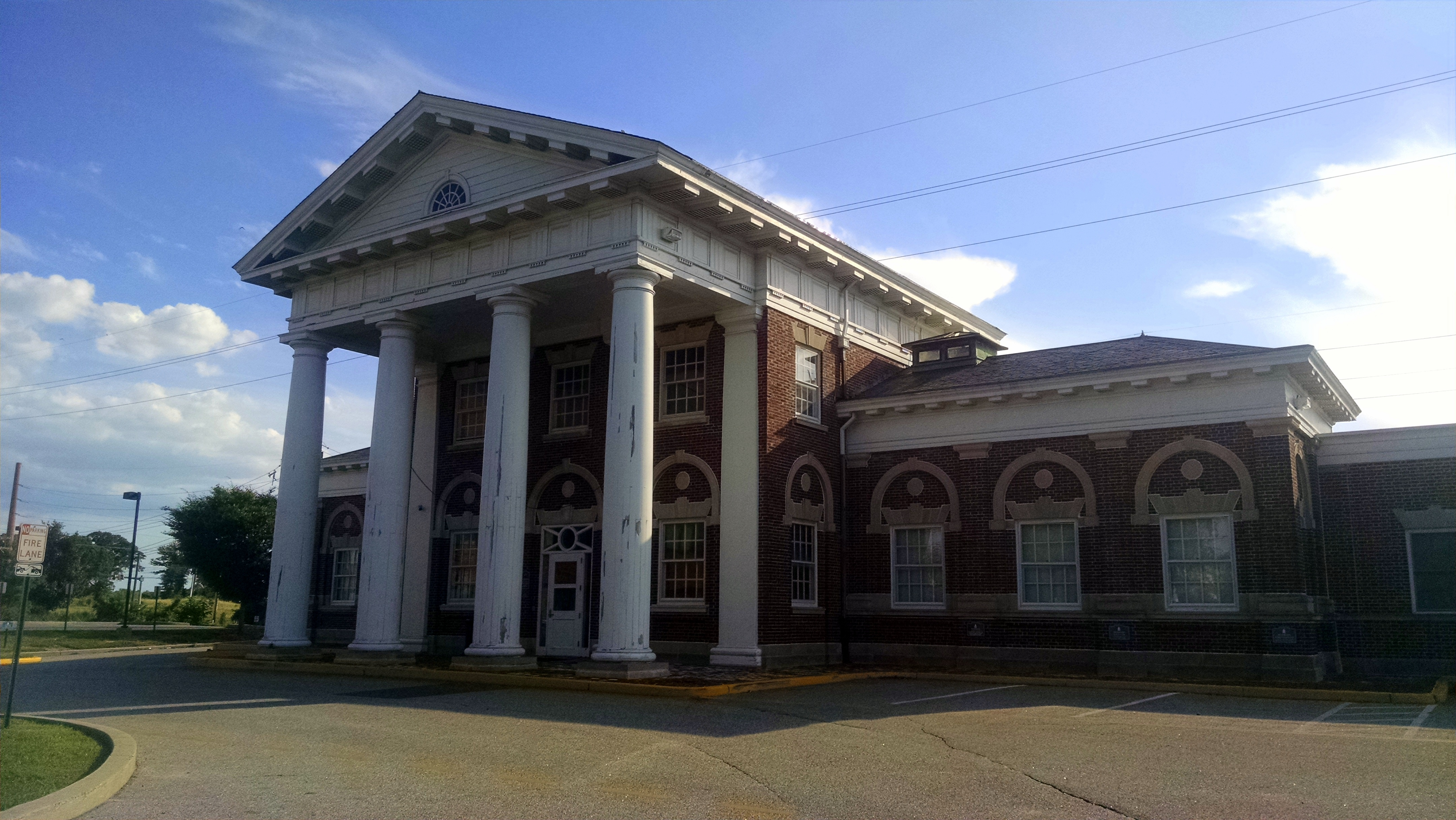
Pennsylvania Railroad station, Dover, Delaware

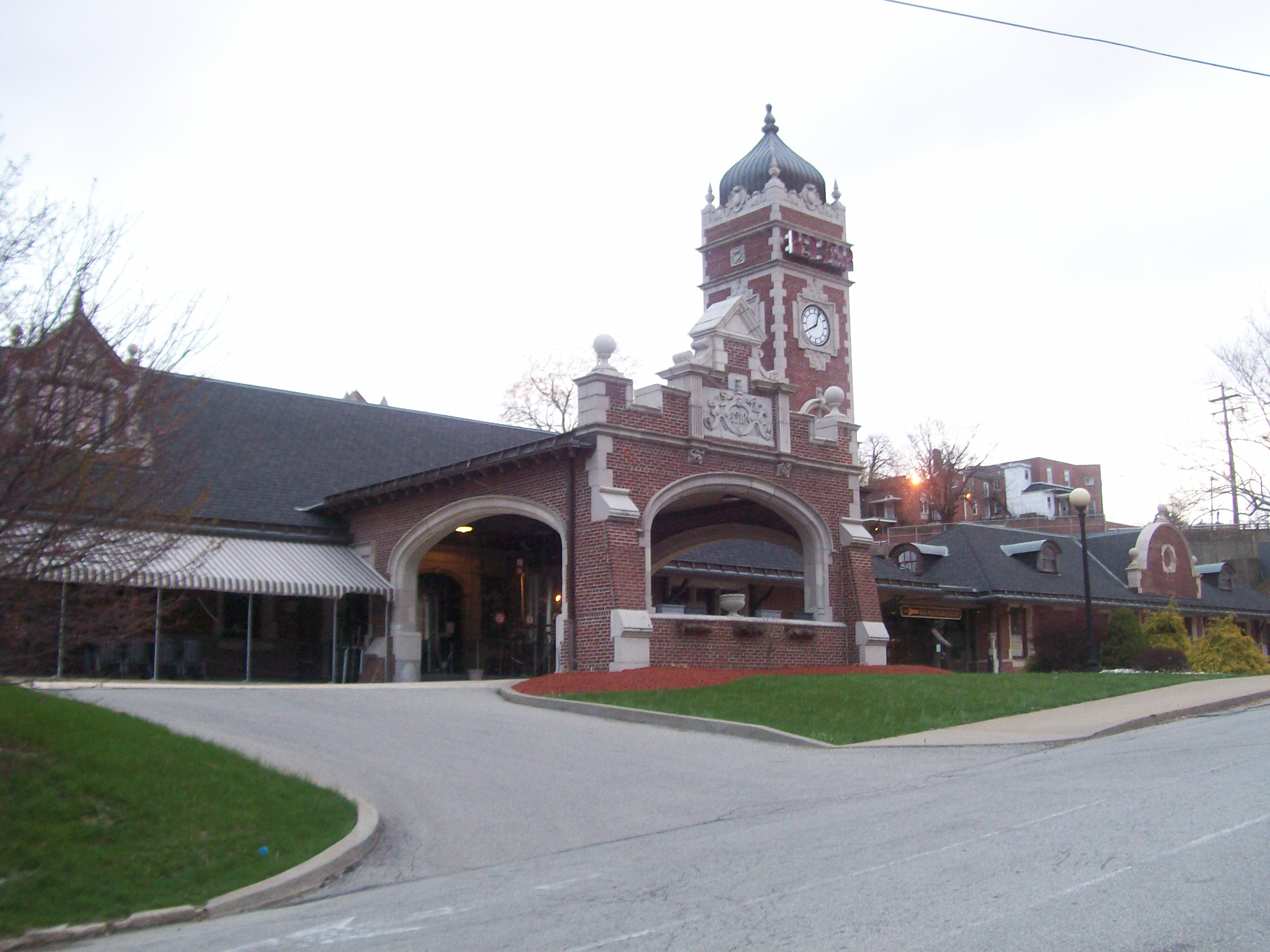
Pennsylvania Railroad station, Greensburg, Pennsylvania

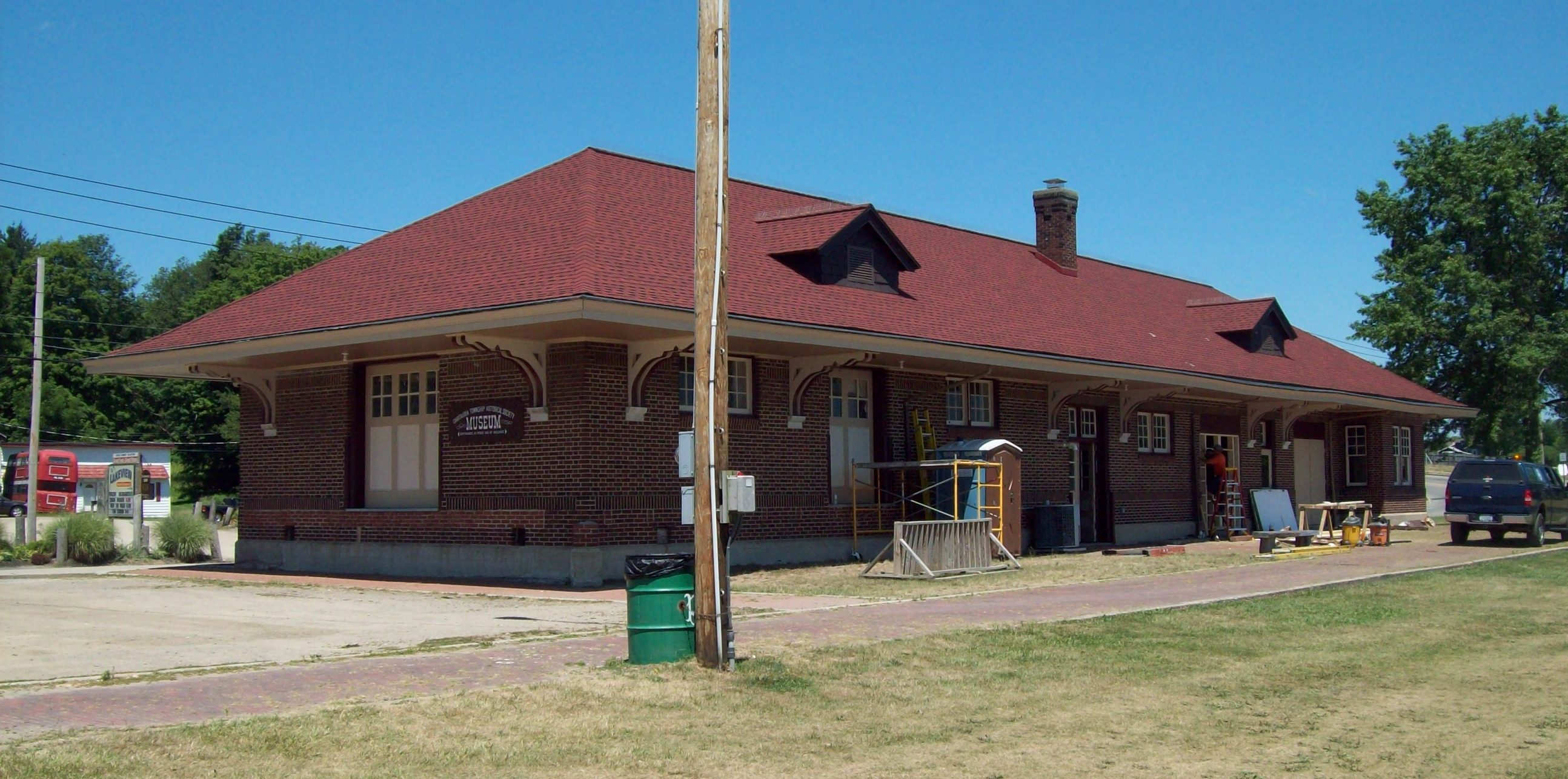
Pennsylvania Railroad station, Mayville, New York

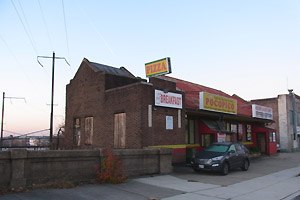
Pennsylvania Railroad Station, Edmondson Avenue, Baltimore, Maryland
