= Howard Street (Baltimore) =

Street in Baltimore, United States

Coordinates: 39°17′44″N 76°37′11.35″W

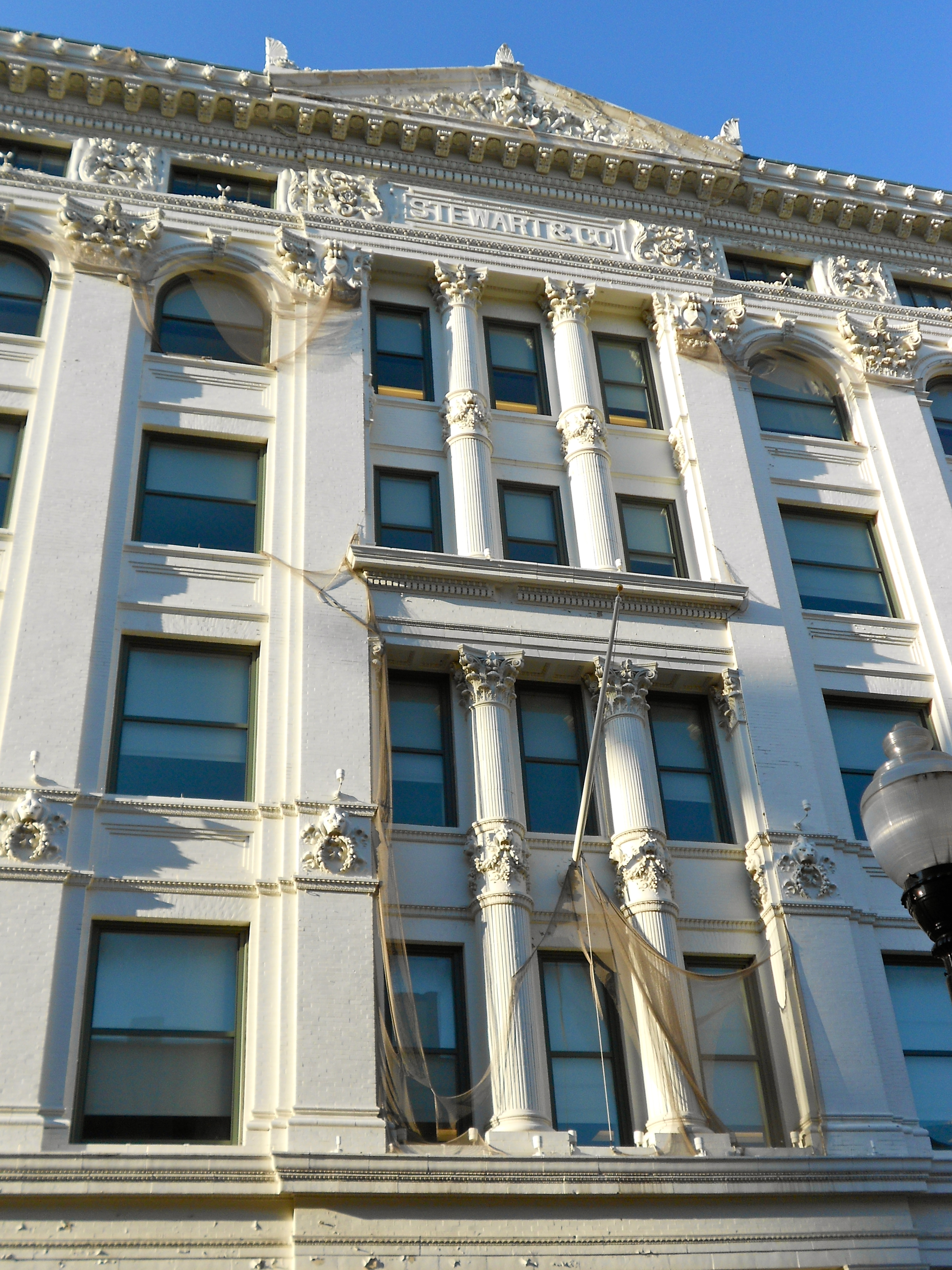
- former Stewart's building
- Interactive map of Howard Street
- Owner: City of Baltimore
- Location: Baltimore
- Postal code: 21201, 21218, 21230
- North end: Art Museum Drive and 29th Street
- South end: Cal Ripken Way (I-395) and Conway Street

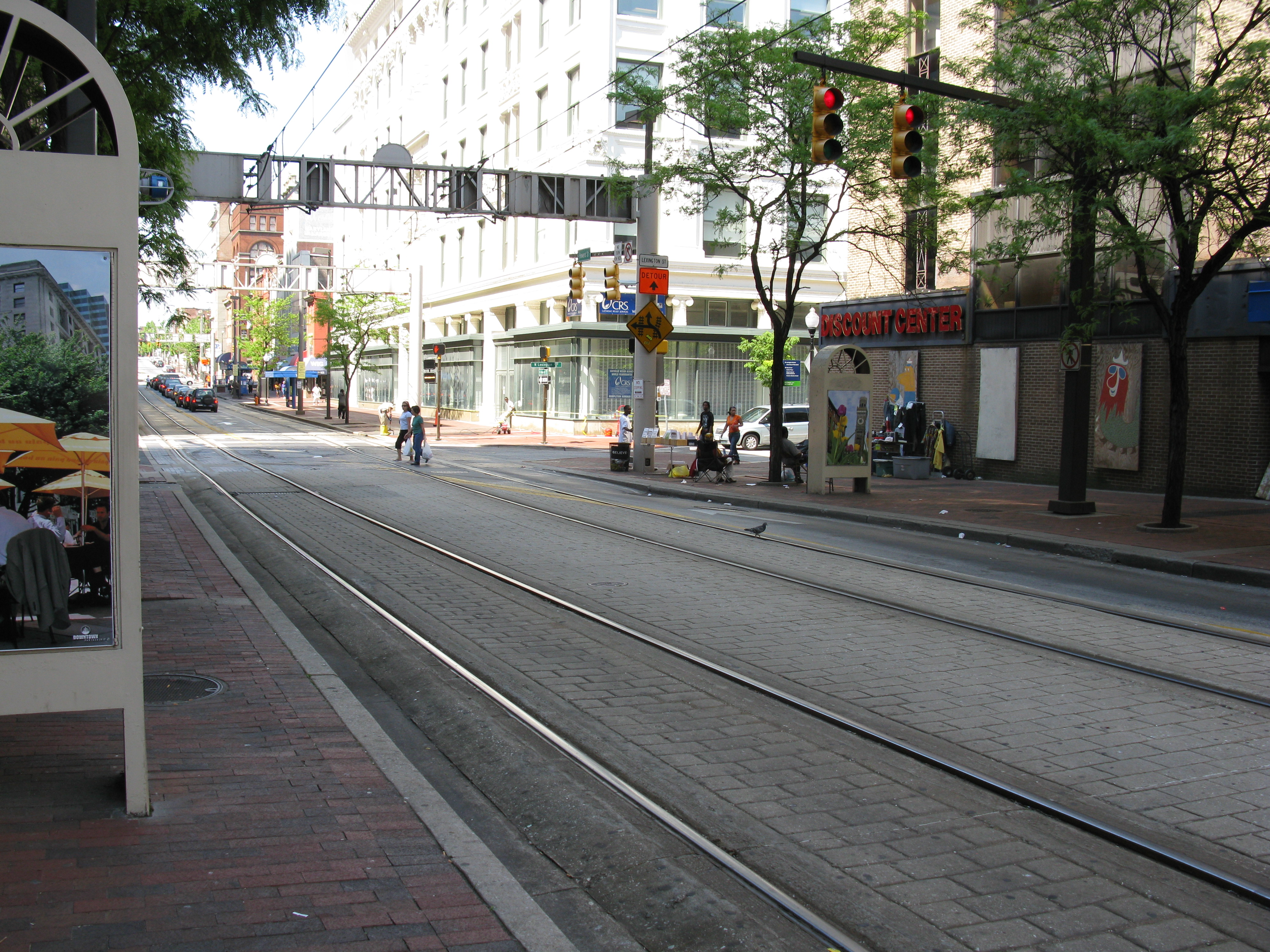
Light rail lines along North Howard Street at West Lexington Street

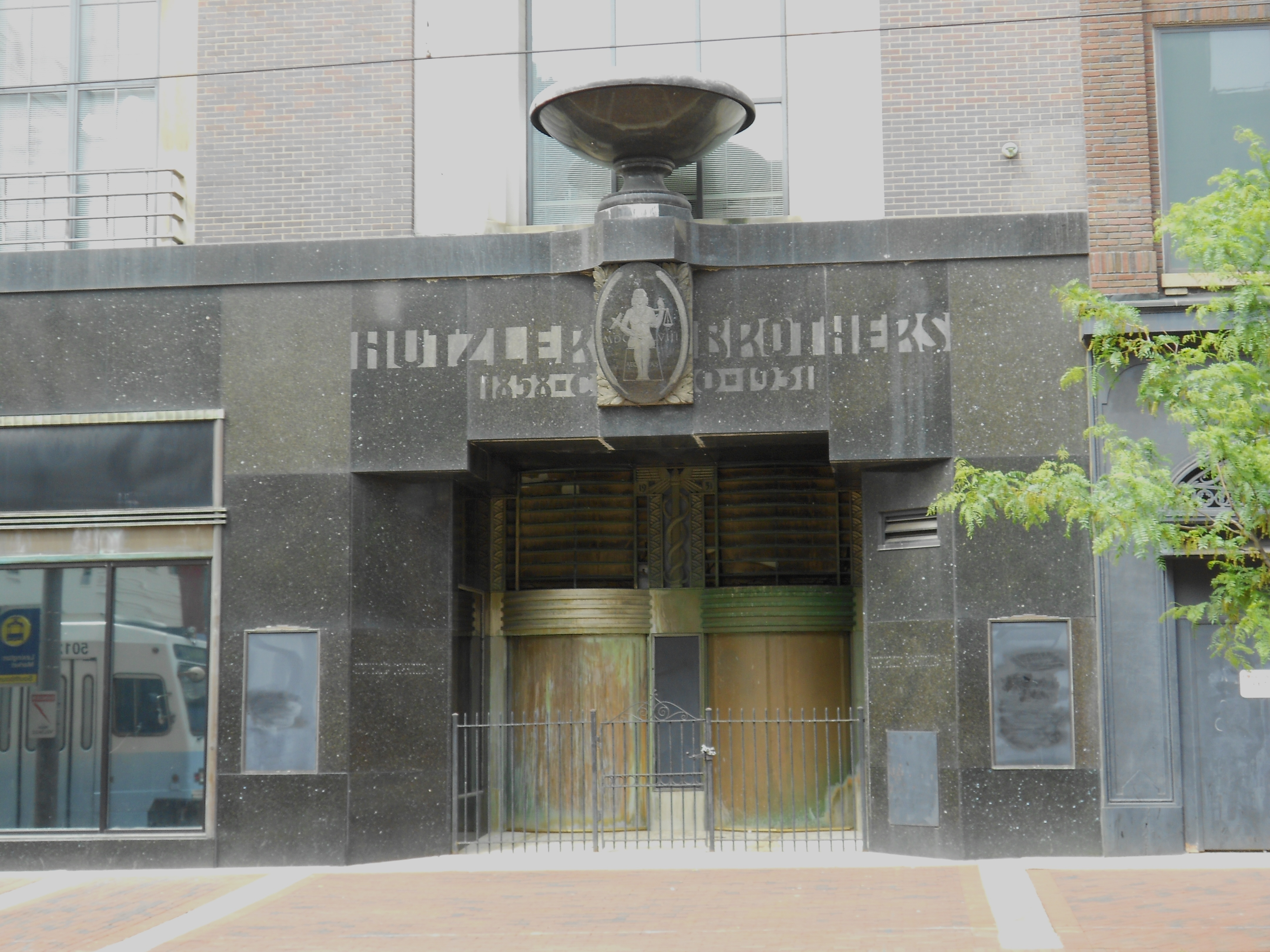
entrance to former Hutzler's department store

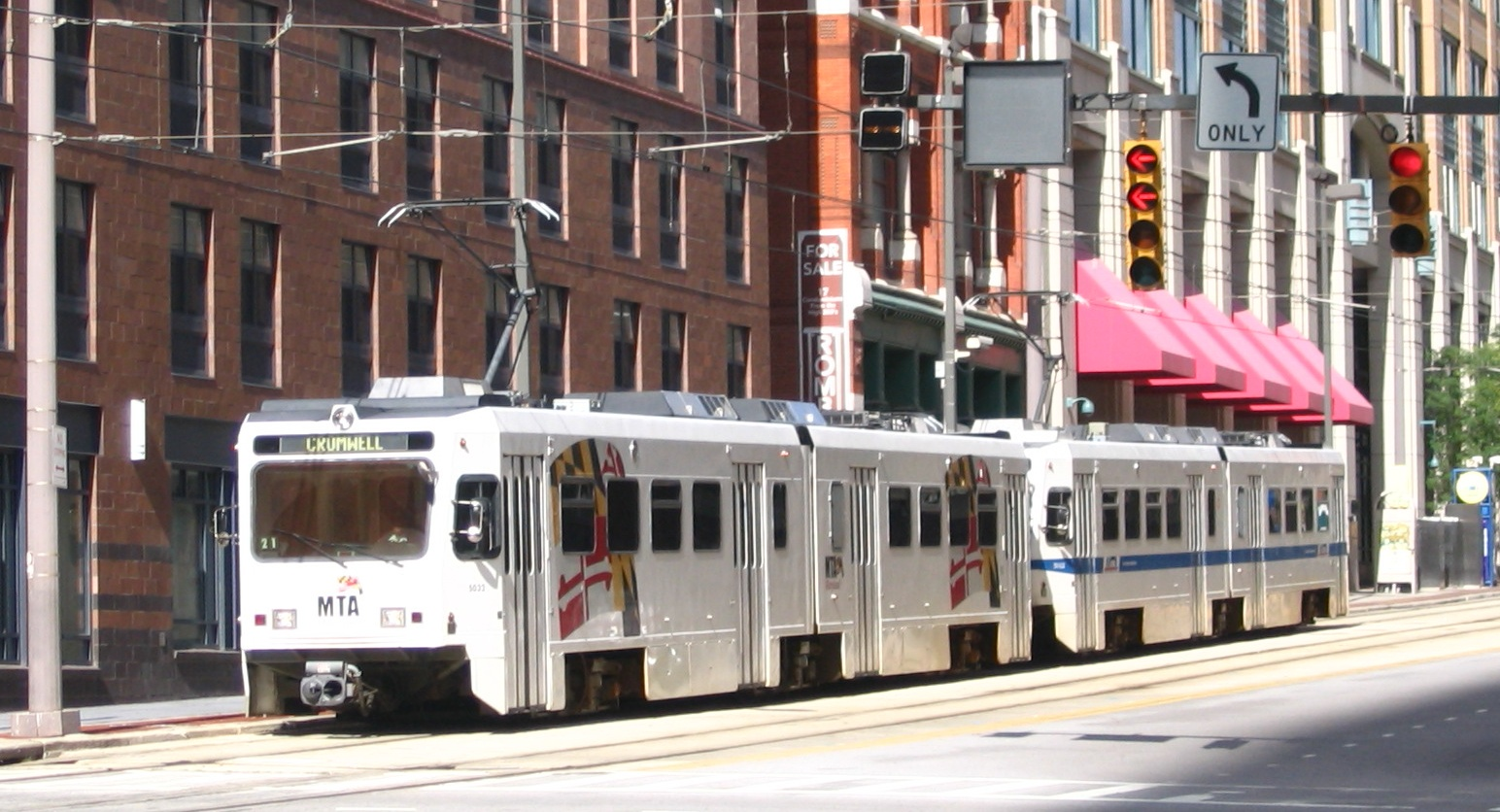
The light rail operating along Howard Street

Howard Street is a major north–south street through the central part of the city of Baltimore, Maryland. About 2 1/2 miles (4 km) long, the street begins at the north end of I-395 near Oriole Park at Camden Yards and ends near Johns Hopkins University, where it splits. To the right, it becomes Art Museum Drive, the one-block home of the Baltimore Museum of Art. To the left, it becomes San Martin Drive, which winds road along the western perimeter of the Johns Hopkins University campus and ends at University Parkway. Howard Street is named in honor of former Maryland governor John Eager Howard. Two other streets in Baltimore, John and Eager Streets, are also named after him.

At one time, Howard Street was a two-way street throughout its entire route. In 1989, when construction began on the Central Light Rail line, Howard Street was made one-way in a northbound direction between Pratt Street and Martin Luther King Jr. Boulevard; as such, southbound traffic now uses Eutaw Street, one block to the west. The light rail runs along Howard Street within this area, which is most of Downtown Baltimore, and near Howard Street for much of the remainder of its route in the downtown area.

== Retail hub of Baltimore ==
Howard Street around Lexington and Clay Streets was the center of upscale department and specialty store shopping until decline and eventual store closures in the 1970s, with Hutzler's, Stewart's, Hecht's and Hochschild Kohn all located on or facing Howard. Three of the four had side entrances on Lexington Street, which was lined with smaller shops. Lexington connected to Charles Street which was lined with boutiques, jewelers and linen shops nearby O'Neill & Co., a 19th-century "carriage trade" store, which closed in 1954. Despite much redevelopment in Central Baltimore, these blocks of Howard have been largely abandoned for 40 years or more.

== Landmarks ==
Notable landmarks on or near Howard Street include:

- Baltimore Convention Center
- Lexington Market
- Maryland Institute College of Art
- Maryland State Office Center
- Mayfair Theatre at 508 North Howard St.
- Meyerhoff Symphony Hall
- Oriole Park
- University of Maryland Medical Center Midtown Campus

== Tunnel ==
In the downtown area, a tunnel owned by CSX Transportation runs below Howard Street. This tunnel was first proposed in the 1880s and built in the 1890s as part of the Baltimore and Ohio Railroad.

== Antique Row ==
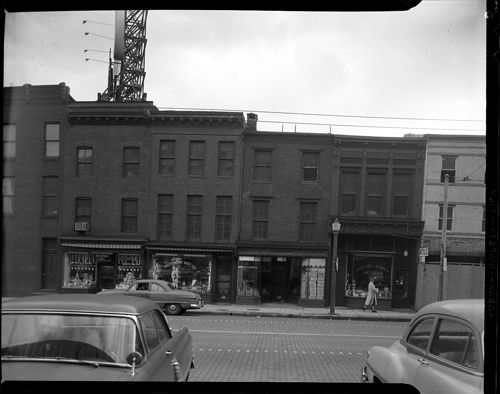
Antique Row 895 N. Howard Street

Antique Row is a cluster of antique shops along the 800 block of North Howard Street in downtown. It dates back to the late 19th century as a cabinetmaking center. In the 1950s Antique Row was at its height, and there were over 50 shops. In the 1960s, the expansion of Maryland General Hospital eliminated those on the west side of the street. Antique Row declined further when the department stores along Howard Street closed, the last one, Hutzler's, in 1989. The construction of the Baltimore Light Rail beginning that same year also slowed down business for the shops for three consecutive years. Once construction was complete, light rail brought more people to Antique Row, although it hasn't regained its former popularity.

Antique Row has also had to battle the increased interest in other downtown attractions such as Fells Point and the Inner Harbor. The lack of activity on Howard Street has resulted in an increase in crime and fewer visitors. In turn, the decline in customers is causing shop owners and dealers to move in search of better business; the owners of one long-time shop downsized and moved to a stall.

Antique Row is known for its contribution to the community as well as its vast collection of antiques. The neighborhood supports the arts, and became a home to the Eubie Blake National Jazz Institute and Cultural Center at 847 N. Howard Street in 2000. It is hoped that the opening of other art institutions will aid in the revival of Antique Row.

== Howard Street Bridge ==
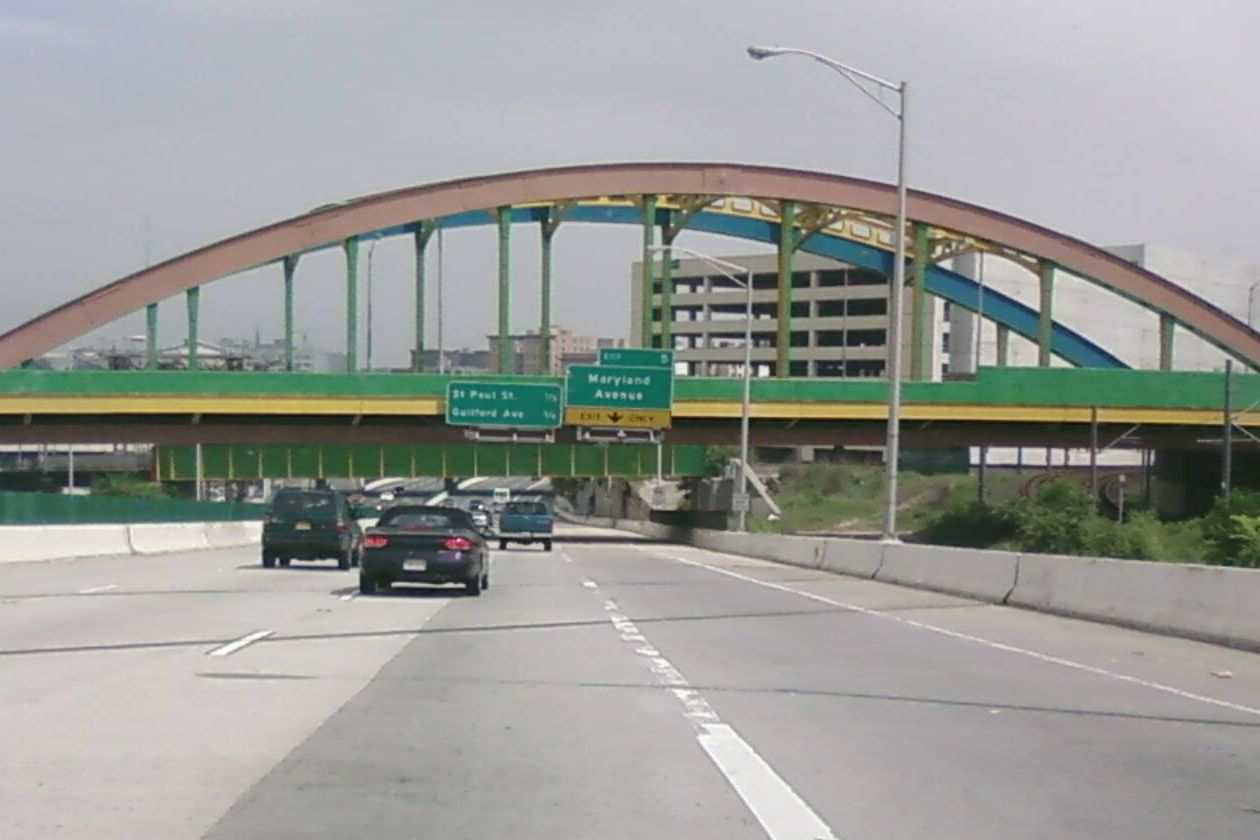
The Howard Street Bridge, seen from Interstate 83

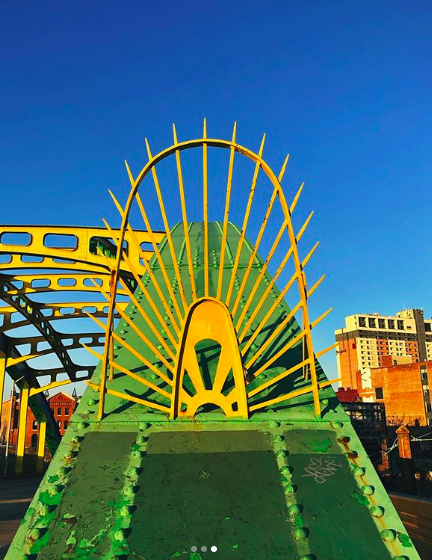

One of Howard Street's unique features is the twin steel arch-style bridge that crosses the Jones Falls Expressway, the CSX and Northern Central Railway (and currently the light rail), and Falls Road. Built between 1937 and 1939 by the J. E. Greiner Company to replace an earlier 19th-century iron arch bridge, the 979-foot-long (298 m) bridge begins shortly after the Mt. Royal Avenue underpass, and continues to the intersection at North Avenue.

At times, there has been debate over what colors to paint the bridge. Request has been made from citizens to get involved in making the decision. Polling has been used as a method to determine the color the bridge should be painted.

On November 17, 2011, Occupy Baltimore protesters marched on the Howard Street Bridge. The bridge was chosen by the protesters because they said it was a symbol of the city's decaying infrastructure and the need to get Americans back to work.

== Arches ==
During the 1980s, a series of decorative arches were installed along the downtown part of Howard Street in order to add a unique style to the area and its shops. However, when light rail construction began, most of these arches had to be removed because trains would not have been able to pass underneath.

== Howard Street Tunnel fire ==
On July 18, 2001, a freight train in the tunnel below Howard Street derailed, causing a chemical fire that raged for six days and did damage to Howard Street and the light rail that took several months to repair.
