= West Baltimore station =

Railway station in Baltimore, Maryland

West Baltimore
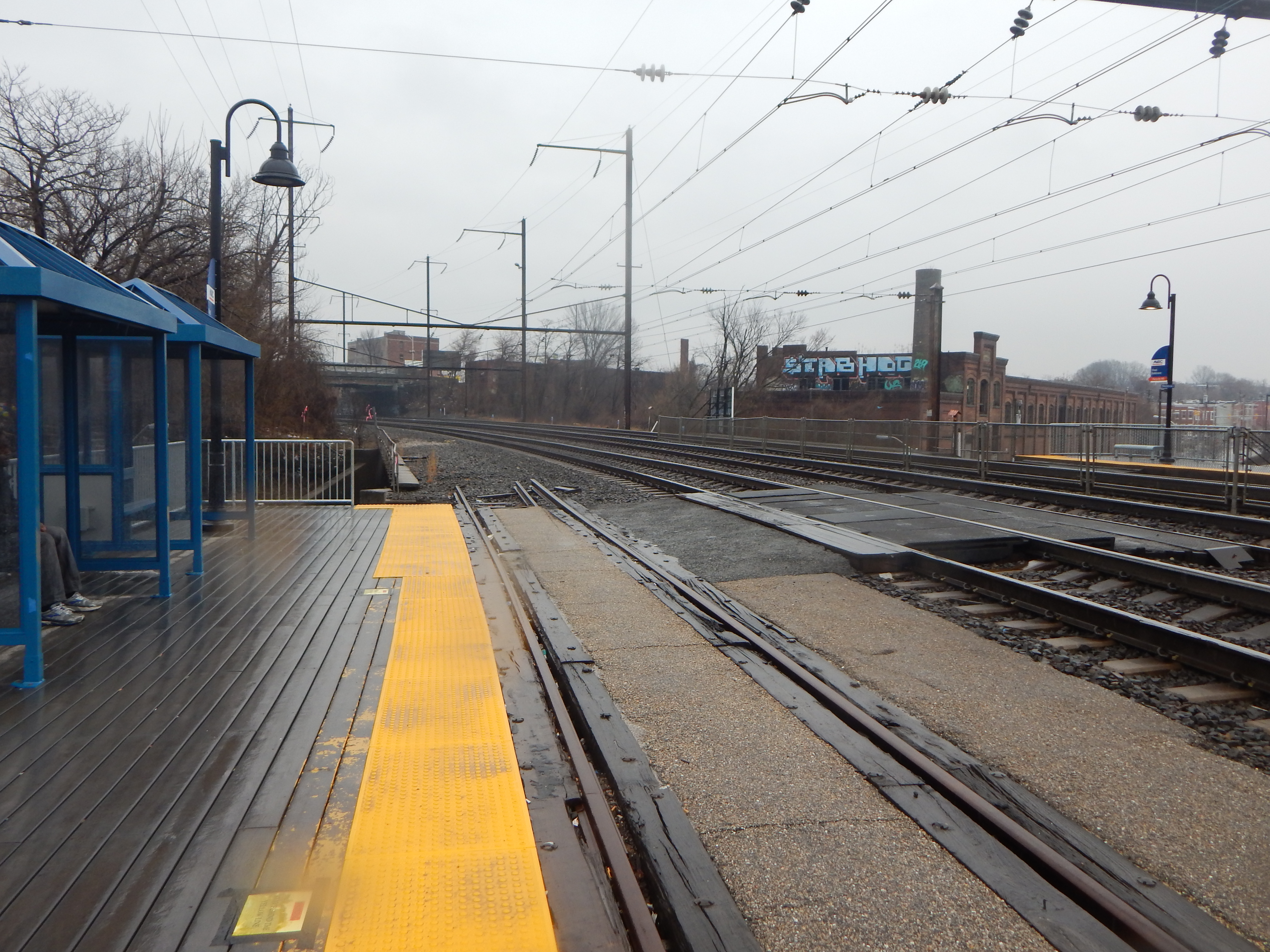
- West Baltimore station platforms in March 2015

General information
- Location: 401 North Smallwood Street; Baltimore, Maryland, U.S.
- Coordinates: 39°17′36″N 76°39′11″W
- Owner: Maryland Transit Administration
- Line: Amtrak Northeast Corridor
- Platforms: 2 side platforms
- Tracks: 4
- Connections: MTA BaltimoreLink: Blue, Orange, Pink, 26, 77, 150, 163

Construction
- Parking: 327 spaces
- Accessible: No

History
- Opened: April 30, 1984
- Electrified: 1935

Passengers
- 2018: 823 daily ▲7%

Services
Preceding station	MARC	Following station
Halethorpe toward Union Station	Penn Line	Penn Station toward Perryville
Former services at Edmondson
Preceding station	Amtrak	Following station
Baltimore Airport toward Washington, D.C.	Chesapeake	Baltimore toward Philadelphia–Suburban
Preceding station	Pennsylvania Railroad	Following station
Frederick Road toward Washington, D.C.	Philadelphia, Wilmington and Baltimore Railroad	Baltimore toward Philadelphia
Location

West Baltimore station is a commuter rail station located in the western part Baltimore, Maryland, along the Northeast Corridor. It is served by MARC Penn Line trains. The station is positioned on an elevated grade at 400 Smallwood Street near parallel West Mulberry and West Franklin Streets extending off U.S. Route 40. Three large surface lots are available for commuters. The station only has staircases from street level and two low-level side platforms next to the outer tracks and is thus not accessible to people with some mobility disabilities, but MTA Maryland plans to renovate the station with accessible platforms and entrances.

== History ==
=== Edmondson ===
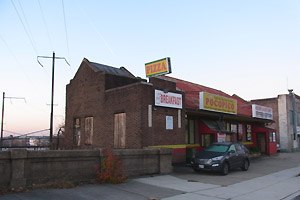
The former Edmondson station building in 2017

The Baltimore and Potomac Railroad (B&P), owned by the Pennsylvania Railroad, opened to Baltimore in 1873. By the early 1900s, PRR stopped at Lafayette and Calverton, also known as Gwynns Falls, west of Baltimore, serving local residential areas. Because both the B&P and the Northern Central Railway approached Penn Station from the west, PRR through trains from Washington, D.C. to Harrisburg, Pennsylvania had to operate in reverse from Baltimore to Washington, D.C. To correct this, PRR planned to replace the two stops with a single intercity-oriented station located between them, along with a wye at the north end of the Baltimore and Potomac Tunnel to allow trains to bypass Penn Station.

PRR opened bidding for station construction in July 1916. Its cost was $50,000, the equivalent to $1,500,000 in 2025. The Spanish Mission style station, constructed of red brick with a terra-cotta tile roof, was designed by PRR staff architect William Holmes Cookman. The station, named Edmondson, opened on May 1, 1917. Original plans called for the installation of high-level platforms and a footbridge connecting them to the station building. However, this was delayed by the nationalization of railroads during World War I, and neither the station improvements nor the wye was ultimately built.

Unlike the comparable North Philadelphia station in North Philadelphia, Edmondson was not a success. It was far from the city center without a good transit connection to it, and without the wye the station did not serve Harrisburg trains. Instead of being a major intercity stop, Edmondson was mostly served by local commuter service between Washington and Baltimore. Local service continued under Penn Central from 1968 to 1976, then under Conrail until 1983, and finally as the Amtrak-operated, state-funded AMDOT service, which was renamed the MARC Penn Line in 1984.

In March 1979, the station closed briefly following an accident that destroyed the stairway to the platform. Amtrak's Chesapeake, a limited-stop commuter train between Washington and Philadelphia, began stopping at Edmondson on July 29, 1979. The Chesapeake was discontinued on October 30, 1983.

=== West Baltimore ===
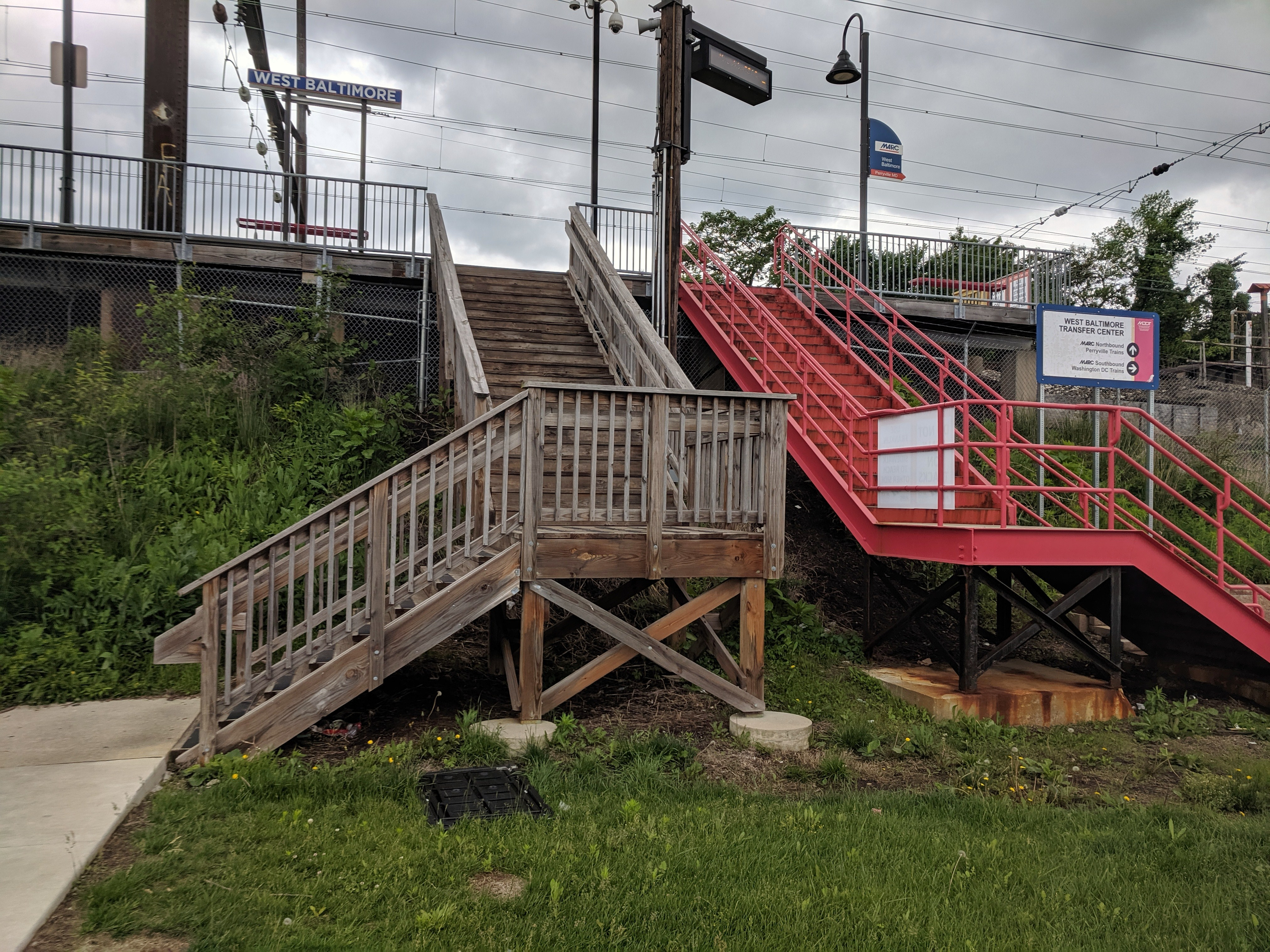
Stairs leading to the platform of the West Baltimore station in May 2019; the two sets of stairs on each side on the station are the entrances to the platform.

Edmondson continued to be a stop on the state-funded commuter service. The Edmondson and Frederick Road stops were closed on April 27, 1984; they were replaced with the West Baltimore station, located two blocks to the south of Edmondson Avenue, on April 30. The stairs and platforms were removed, but the station building remains in place as a private business, which it had been converted to prior to the stop's closure.

In 2009, it was announced that approximately 400 parking spaces east of Pulaski Street would be added, as part of the project to remove the portion of Interstate 170, which is now Route 40, that never carried vehicular traffic. The spots were not to be permanent, but instead only available until redevelopment of the surrounding neighborhood. The expressway was demolished in the fall of 2010, and the spaces opened soon after.

West Baltimore station has attracted criticism for being unsafe due to the poor conditions of the platforms and staircases, which are crumbling and rusted.

As part of the larger project to repair the Interstate 170 area, the station will be improved over a period of several years. Immediate repairs to the stairs and platforms and improved shelters and lighting, were made in 2014. The platforms are planned to be extended to serve more cars per train and raised for accessibility, and ramps built to surrounding streets. The Red Line light rail service, originally planned to begin construction in 2015 prior to cancellation of the project that year opened in 2022; however, it was resurrected in 2023, and construction is scheduled to begin in 2026 or 2027, is to run along the Route 40 corridor in the median of the highway underneath the elevated city streets with a stop at West Baltimore. Escalators and elevators will be used to transport commuters from the station to the streets above the Route 40 corridor in West Baltimore. The station is additionally planned to be relocated as part of the Frederick Douglass Tunnel project. The new station will be on the new alignment slightly to the west, with full-length high-level platforms running south from West Franklin Street.

== Bus connections ==
The station is also served by seven MTA Bus routes:

- CityLink Blue – Johns Hopkins Bayview to Westgate / CMS
- CityLink Orange – West Baltimore to Essex
- CityLink Pink – West Baltimore to Cedonia
- LocalLink 26 – Mondawmin Metro to South Baltimore Park & Ride
- LocalLink 77 – West Baltimore MARC to Catonsville
- Express BusLink 150 – Harbor East to Columbia
- Express BusLink 163 – West Baltimore MARC to Tradepoint Atlantic
