= Perkins Square Gazebo =

- U.S. National Register of Historic Places
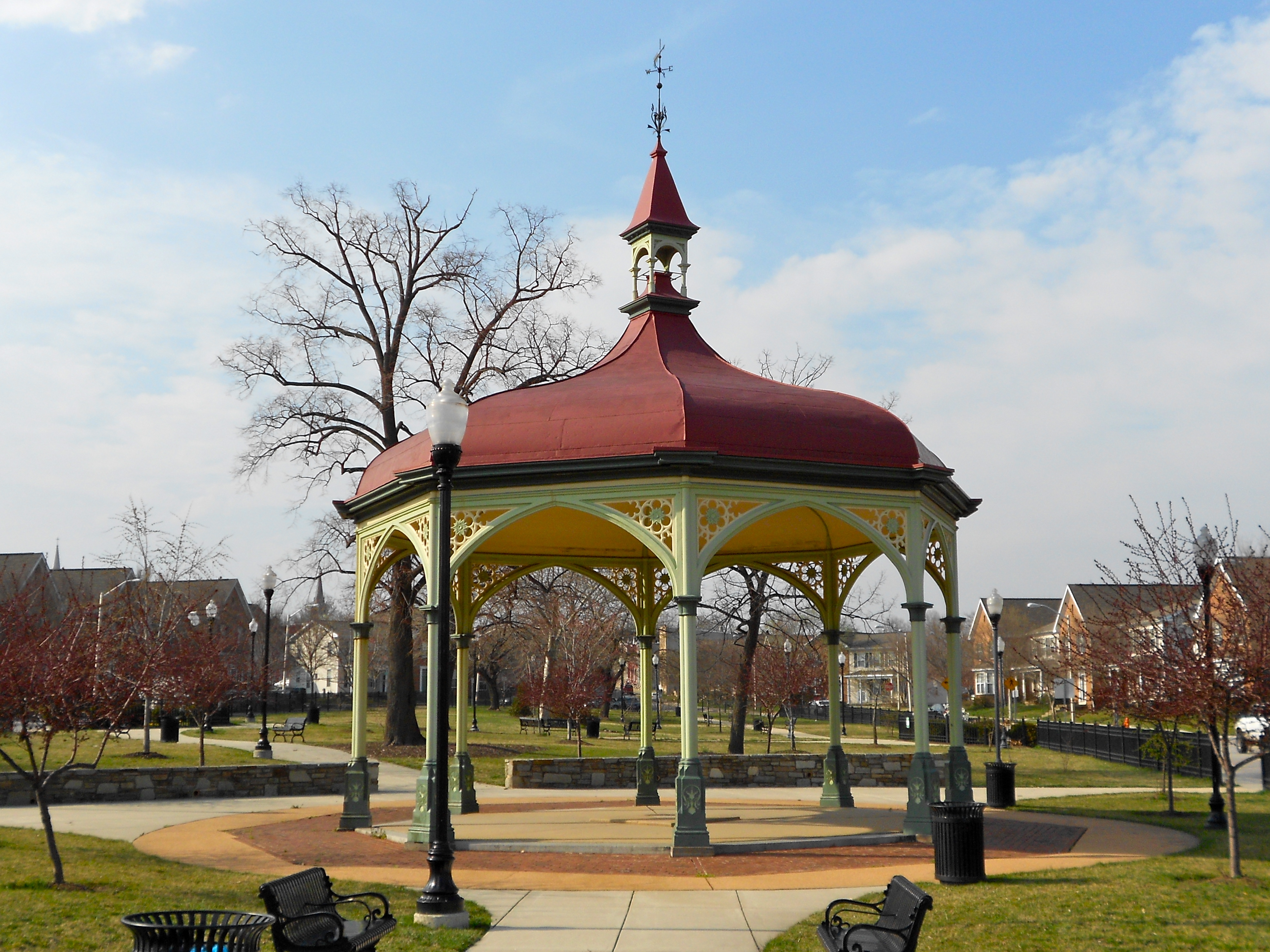
- Perkins Square Gazebo, March 2012

- Location within Baltimore Location within Maryland Location within the United States
- Location: George St. and Myrtle Ave., Baltimore, Maryland
- Coordinates: 39°17′44″N 76°37′45″W
- Area: 2.9 acres (1.2 ha)
- Built: 1871
- Architectural style: Late Victorian
- NRHP reference No.: 83002937
- Added to NRHP: July 28, 1983

Perkins Square Gazebo is a historic gazebo located at Baltimore, Maryland, United States. It is an eight-sided, cast iron, open structure of eclectic Victorian design. It was constructed in 1871 and located in a triangular-shaped park in West Baltimore. It is currently located within the Heritage Crossing townhome community that was constructed on the former site of the Murphy Homes public housing project.

Perkins Square Gazebo was listed on the National Register of Historic Places in 1983.
