= Interstate 170 (Maryland) =

Highway in Maryland

Interstate 170
- Proposed I-170 corridor highlighted in red

Route information
- Auxiliary route of I-70
- Maintained by Baltimore Department of Public Works (BDPW)
- Length: 2.3 mi (3.7 km) extrapolated from cancelation info
- Existed: 1969–1983
- NHS: Entire route

Major junctions
- West end: I-70 at Gwynns Falls Park
- US 1
- East end: US 40 at MLK Blvd.

Location
- Country: United States
- State: Maryland
- Counties: City of Baltimore

Highway system
- Interstate Highway System; Main; Auxiliary; Suffixed; Business; Future; Maryland highway system; Interstate; US; State; Scenic Byways
| ← MD 169 | → MD 170 |

Interstate 170 (I-170) was the designation for a 2.3-mile (3.7 km) freeway in Baltimore, Maryland, that currently carries U.S. Route 40 (US 40). The freeway was originally planned to be the eastern terminus of I-70 and, later, a link between I-70 and the west side of Downtown Baltimore. However, after the Baltimore portion of I-70 was canceled due to community opposition, the freeway was left disconnected from the Interstate system and its Interstate designation rescinded. Local citizens and environmental groups have given the freeway nicknames of "The Highway to Nowhere" and "The Ditch", the latter owing to its mostly below-grade construction; other names include the "Westside Freeway" and the "Franklin–Mulberry Expressway", both referring to its location in the city. Growing support for the freeway's removal has occurred over the last several years.

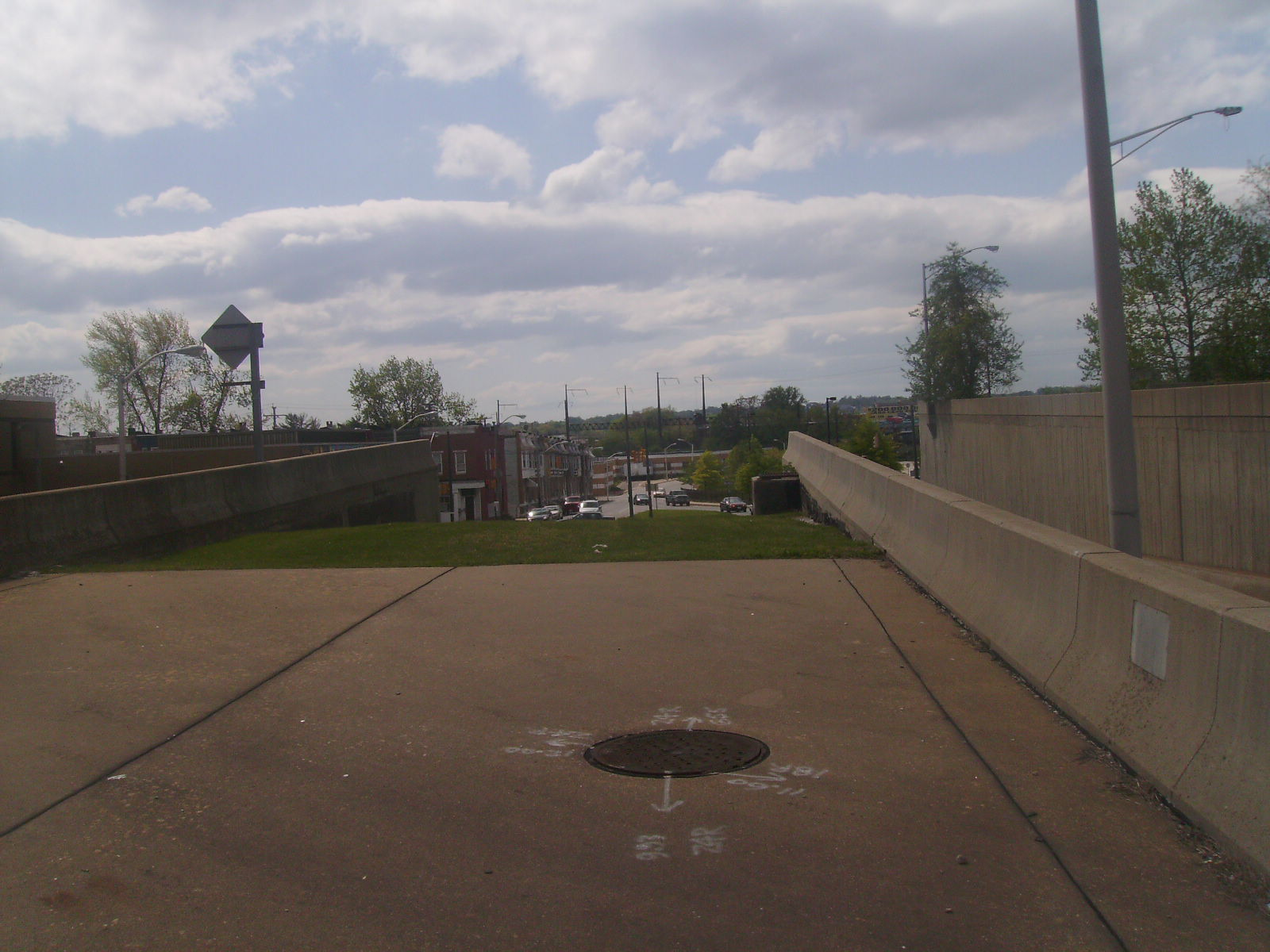
The western end of the freeway stub in Baltimore intended for use by the canceled I-170 in 2010. This freeway is now used by US 40.

== Route description ==
I-170 would have begun at a directional T interchange with I-70 where Baltimore Street and Amtrak's Northeast Corridor cross Gwynns Falls. The Interstate would have paralleled the north side of the railroad tracks through what is presently an industrial area. I-170 would have crossed Mulberry Street (eastbound US 40) and veered east through what are now parking lots for West Baltimore station on MARC's Penn Line to seamlessly connect with the portion of I-170 that was constructed east of Pulaski Street. The unconstructed freeway would have had an eastbound exit ramp to Mulberry Street and a westbound entrance ramp from Franklin Street (westbound US 40), with both ramps also having direct access to and from Monroe Street (southbound US 1). These ramps, which were partially constructed when the highway was built and torn down in 2010, would have connected US 1 with I-170 in the direction of I-70.

The ramps from Mulberry Street and to Franklin Street to connect with the portion of I-170 that was completed are now part of US 40. The ramps merge with the uncompleted freeway under Fulton Avenue (northbound US 1). Originally beginning and ending at Pulaski Street, these ramps have since been truncated to a now-continuous Payson Street. US 40 heads east as a six-lane freeway in a cut between Mulberry and Franklin streets. Along the way, it passes under eight roadway bridges and two pedestrian bridges (Stricker Street and Carrollton Avenue). East of the Schroeder Street underpass, the freeway reduces to four lanes at the eastbound ramp to Mulberry Street and the westbound ramp from Franklin Street, which connect the freeway with Martin Luther King Jr. Boulevard. After US 40 passes over the boulevard, the freeway ends by merging with Mulberry and Franklin streets just west of their intersections with Greene Street, which heads south as Maryland Route 295 (MD 295).

== History ==
Under the proposed routing of the Interstate Highways through Baltimore, I-70 would have been routed through west Baltimore to join I-95, and I-170 would have been a spur from I-70 into central Baltimore. However, the spur was left stranded from the rest of the Interstate Highway System by the cancellation of I-70 within the city limits of Baltimore.

=== Planning ===
Several proposals were made during the 1940s and 1950s for an East–West Expressway through Baltimore. After nine different proposals were floated, in 1960 the city's Department of Planning published a proposal of its own. The route in the proposal (then designated as I-70N) would have begun in the western edge of the city, passing through Gwynns Falls/Leakin Park. It would have then curved south in the direction of Edmondson Avenue, then turned east and followed the Franklin–Mulberry street corridor. It would have then curved south into the Pratt Street corridor and crossed the city to the north of the Inner Harbor on an elevated viaduct within the central business district, junctioning I-83 and I-95 in the southeast edge of Downtown Baltimore. This routing was eventually further refined and modified and eventually became part of the Baltimore 10-D Interstate System, approved in 1962.

By 1969, the Design Concept Team, a multidiscipline group assembled in 1966 by the city government to help design freeway routings that would not disrupt the city's fabric, had replaced the 10-D System with the Baltimore 3-A Interstate and Boulevard System. In the 3-A system, I-170 was brought into existence, and was planned as a freeway spur from I-70 (which would continue south toward the current alignment of I-95) through the Franklin–Mulberry street corridor formerly followed by the East–West Expressway to the west edge of the central business district, connecting to a new route named Harbor City Boulevard (now known as Martin Luther King Jr. Boulevard). Besides ending at the western edge of downtown, I-170 would also run further south than the original East–West Expressway proposal. The 3-A System's result was that I-170 would provide direct access to the central business district. Curiously, I-170's three-way semi-directional interchange with I-70 was planned to be partially integrated with I-70's interchange with Hilton Parkway; diagrams of the interchange show that the ramp from eastbound I-70 to eastbound I-170 would have diverged within the latter interchange and run alongside I-70's eastbound carriageway to the western terminus of I-170, where it would diverge.

=== Construction ===
Construction began on I-170 in 1975 and was finished in 1979. The completed section runs mainly below street level, rising above it at the eastern end; the same was also true for the western end until it was leveled in late 2010. The wide median space was originally reserved for a once-proposed branch of the Baltimore Metro SubwayLink system; this rail line was never built, and more recent plans for the Red Line, a proposed light rail corridor that would have been built by 2016 (but was canceled in 2015) would have made use of the median. However, the Red Line was resurrected in 2023 (with the same plans as before), and construction may begin by 2027.

=== Cancelation ===
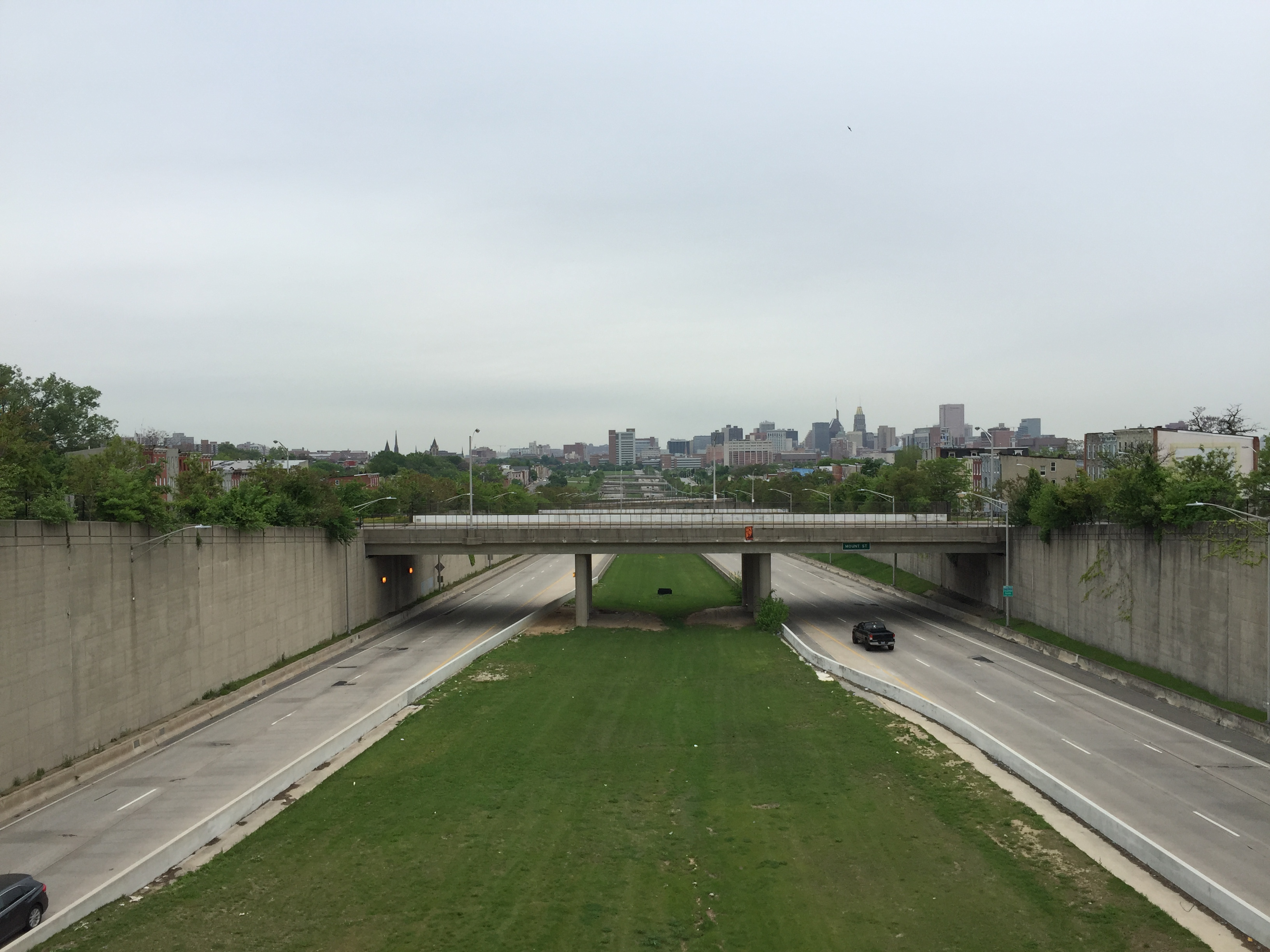
View east along US 40 (former I-170) from Fulton Avenue (US 1 northbound)

I-170's future was left in doubt after extended protest from environmental groups led to the cancelation of the segment of I-70 between Security Boulevard (exit 94) and I-170 (scrapped exit 96) on September 3, 1981. As a result of this cancelation, it was proposed to connect the existing I-170 to I-95 via the southern portion of the original proposed I-70 expansion, with the entire spur redesignated I-595; however, this segment was canceled on July 22, 1983, in the face of further opposition. I-595 was later assigned to a different highway in Maryland (it now exists as an unsigned designation for US 50 between the Capital Beltway and Annapolis). With I-170's connection to the Interstate System removed, it was promptly deleted. US 40 was rerouted onto the stub freeway in its place.

== Future ==
Various proposals for the isolated highway stub have been floated: in addition to the proposed use of its public transit right-of-way, it has also been suggested that the road be dismantled, with land filled for new homes to replace the ones that had been demolished for the freeway's construction. In 2010, demolition work began on the structures at the western edge of the highway that had been intended to link to the wider Interstate System and had never been used by automobiles, including the ramps to Mulberry Street and from Franklin Street at their respective intersections with Monroe Street; by 2012, these were replaced by green space and an expanded parking lot for nearby West Baltimore station, and Payson Street was made continuous between Mulberry and Franklin streets; as a result, the freeway ends at Payson Street instead of Pulaski Street. The remaining section of the highway is still key to the Red Line project that was canceled by Governor Larry Hogan in 2015, but then revived by his successor Wes Moore in 2023.

Representative Karen Bass sponsored a bill in the 116th Congress entitled the Build Local, Hire Local Act (HR 4101). This bill would include a new program entitled the "Community Connect Grant". As a part of this program, urban-renewal era highway projects would be torn down, such as the former I-170. As a result of the project, low-income, racially diverse neighborhoods, such as Harlem Park and Upton, north of the I-170 infrastructure, and the Franklin Square and Poppleton neighborhoods south, would soon be reconnected, which could possibly reduce crime and increase business. A similar project was the destruction of the Inner Loop Highway in Rochester, from November 2014 to December 2017 and partially funded by a Transportation Investment Generating Economic Recovery grant; it was replaced by new apartment buildings, shops, and restaurants. The bill was referred to the Subcommittee on Commodity Exchanges, Energy, and Credit on August 12, 2019.

== Exit list ==
Had I-170 been completed in its entirety, it would have run as follows from I-70: The entire route was in Baltimore.

| mi | km | Exit | Destinations | Notes |
|---|---|---|---|---|
| 0.00 | 0.00 | 1A-B | I-70 west to I-695 – Ellicott City, Frederick I-70 east to I-95 – Washington, D.C., New York City | Western terminus; was signed as 0A (west) and 0B (east) |
| 0.90 | 1.45 | 1C | US 1 (North Monroe Street / North Fulton Avenue) to US 40 | US 40 originally followed Franklin Street (westbound) and Mulberry Street (eastbound). |
| 2.16 | 3.48 | 2A | Martin Luther King Boulevard to US 1 / I-395 | Eastbound exit and westbound entrance |
| 2.30 | 3.70 | 2B | US 40 (West Franklin Street / West Mulberry Street) to MD 295 south (North Greene Street) | Eastbound exit and westbound entrance; eastern terminus |
1.000 mi = 1.609 km; 1.000 km = 0.621 mi

== See also ==
- Highway revolts in the United States
