= Perkins (disambiguation) =

Perkins is an English surname.

Perkins may also refer to:

== Places ==
=== In the United States ===
- Perkins, Georgia, an unincorporated community
- Perkins, Iowa, an unincorporated community
- Perkins Township, Maine
- Perkins, Michigan, an unincorporated community
- Perkins, Minnesota, an unincorporated community
- Perkins, Missouri, an unincorporated community
- Perkins Township, Erie County, Ohio
- Perkins, Oklahoma, a city
- Perkins, West Virginia, an unincorporated community
- Perkins County, Nebraska
- Perkins County, South Dakota
- Perkins Creek, Missouri
- Perkins Pond, New York

=== Antarctica ===
- Mount Perkins, Marie Byrd Land
- Perkins Glacier, Marie Byrd Land
- Perkins Canyon, Marie Byrd Land

== People ==
- Perkins Bass (1912-2011), four-time U.S. congressman from New Hampshire
- Perkins Harnly (1901–1986), American painter
- Perkins King (1784-1857), U.S. congressman from New York

== Companies and brands ==
- Perkins Engines, a manufacturer of industrial diesel engines established in Peterborough, UK
- Perkins Restaurant & Bakery, a North American restaurant chain
- Perkins Paste, an Australian brand of adhesive

== Schools in the United States ==
- Perkins School for the Blind, Watertown, Massachusetts
- Perkins School of Theology, Southern Methodist University, Texas
- Perkins High School (Erie County, Ohio)

== Buildings ==
- Perkins Building, Tacoma, Washington
- Perkins Buildings, Providence, Rhode Island
- Perkins Center for the Arts, serving southern New Jersey
- Perkins House (disambiguation)
- Perkins Manor (Contoocook, New Hampshire)
- Perkins Observatory, an astronomical observatory in Delaware, Ohio
- Perkins Opera House, Monticello, Florida
- Perkins Square Gazebo, Baltimore, Maryland
- Perkins Stadium, Whitewater, Wisconsin, used primarily for football
- Perkins Stone Mansion, Akron, Ohio
- Perkins Tide Mill, Kennebunkport, Maine

== Other uses ==
- USS Perkins, three US Navy destroyers
- Camp Perkins, a former Massachusetts Army National Guard camp
- Carl D. Perkins Vocational and Technical Education Act, legislation supporting career and technical education in the U.S.
- Federal Perkins Loan, a need-based type of American student loan
- Illinois v. Perkins, a US Supreme Court case—see Miranda warning#Exemption for interrogations conducted by undercover agents
- Perkins Arboretum, Colby College, Waterville, Maine
- Perkins Brailler, a machine used to write braille
- Perkins Engineering, a racing team in the Australian V8 Supercar Championship Series from 1986 to 2008
- Perkins Estate, Brookline, Massachusetts
- Perkins Field, a public airport near Overton, Nevada

== See also ==
- Perkin's Pillar, British Columbia, Canada, a rock pillar
- Perkin (disambiguation)
