= Perkyn =

Perkyn is a surname originating from Cornwall, England. Notable people with the surname include:

- Richard Perkyn (fl. 1335), MP for Wycombe (UK Parliament constituency)
- Perkyn, character in The Cook's Tale

== See also ==
- Perkin (disambiguation)
