= John Perkins House =

John Perkins House may refer to:

- John Perkins House (Castine, Maine), listed on the National Register of Historic Places in Hancock County, Maine
- John Perkins House (Wenham, Massachusetts), listed on the NRHP in Essex County, Massachusetts

== See also ==
- Perkins House (disambiguation)
