= Perkins House =

Perkins House may refer to:

- William Perkins House, Eutaw, Alabama, listed on the NRHP in Alabama
- Maxwell E. Perkins House, New Canaan, Connecticut, listed on the NRHP
- Perkins-Bill House, Gales Ferry, Connecticut, listed on the NRHP
- Perkins-Rockwell House, Norwich, Connecticut, listed on the NRHP
- Perkins-Clark House, Hartford, Connecticut, listed on the NRHP
- Palmer-Perkins House, Monticello, Florida, listed on the NRHP
- Perkins Opera House, Monticello, Florida, listed on the NRHP
- Dwight Perkins House, Evanston, Illinois, listed on the NRHP in Illinois
- Charles W. and Nellie Perkins House, Cedar Rapids, Iowa, listed on the NRHP in Iowa
- Perkins–Daniel House, Lancaster, Kentucky, listed on the NRHP in Kentucky
- Lucien Perkins Farm, Lancaster, Kentucky, listed on the NRHP in Kentucky
- Dr. John Milton Perkins House, Somerset, Kentucky, listed on the NRHP in Kentucky
- John Perkins House (Castine, Maine), listed on the NRHP in Maine
- Charles Perkins House, Ogunquit, Maine, listed on the NRHP in Maine
- Perkins Estate, Brookline, Massachusetts, listed on the NRHP
- Joseph Perkins House, Methuen, Massachusetts, listed on the NRHP
- John Perkins House (Wenham, Massachusetts), listed on the NRHP in Essex County
- Perkins House (DeKalb, Mississippi), listed on the NRHP in Mississippi
- Perkins–Wiener House, Red Cloud, Nebraska, listed on the NRHP in Nebraska
- Perkins House (Moorestown, New Jersey), listed on the NRHP in New Jersey
- Jackson–Perkins House, Newark, New York, listed on the NRHP
- Perkins House (Newton, North Carolina), listed on the NRHP in North Carolina
- Perkins Stone Mansion, Akron, Ohio, listed on the NRHP in Ohio
- Still–Perkins House, Milton-Freewater, Oregon, listed on the NRHP in Oregon
- Nicholas Tate Perkins House, Franklin, Tennessee, listed on the NRHP
- A. E. Perkins House, Jacksboro, Tennessee, listed on the NRHP in Tennessee
- Hall–Sayers–Perkins House, Bastrop, Texas, listed on the NRHP in Texas
- Crouch–Perkins House, McKinney, Texas, listed on the NRHP in Texas
- Perkins, James I. and Myrta Blake, House, Rusk, Texas, listed on the NRHP in Texas
- Arthur Perkins House, Rutland, Vermont, listed on the NRHP in Vermont
- Frances Perkins House, Washington, D.C., listed on the NRHP in Washington, D.C.
- James A. Perkins House, Colfax, Washington, listed on the NRHP in Washington

== See also ==
- John Perkins House (disambiguation)
