= Clag =

Clag may refer to:

- Clag (glue), an Australian brand, made by Bostik
- Clag, railway terminology for the exhaust emissions of certain locomotives
- Clag (card game), a trick-taking card game
- Conference of Latin Americanist Geographers (CLAG)
- A common name for a horse-fly
