= Jimmie Kennedy =

American football player (born 1952)

- Kennedy in 1977

No. 85
- Positions: Tight end Special teams

Personal information
- Born: July 30, 1952 (age 74); Laurel, Mississippi, U.S.
- Listed height: 6 ft 3 in (1.91 m)
- Listed weight: 233 lb (106 kg)

Career information
- High school: Perkins (Sandusky, Ohio)
- College: Hiram (1971); Colorado State (1972–1973)
- NFL draft: 1974: 9th round, 233rd overall pick

Career history
- Chicago Fire (1974); Baltimore Colts (1975–1977)

Career NFL statistics
- Games played: 37
- Starts: 0
- Receptions: 3
- Yards receiving: 47
- Touchdowns: 1
- Stats at Pro Football Reference

Jimmie Dale Kennedy (born July 30,1952) is an American former professional football player who was a tight end for three seasons with the Baltimore Colts of the National Football League (NFL). He played college football for the Colorado State Rams. Throughout his time in the NFL, Kennedy was a blocking tight end used almost exclusively in short-yardage situations and on special teams as a coverage player on kickoff and punt returns.

== Biography ==
=== Early life ===
Jimmie Kennedy was born July 30, 1952, in Laurel, Mississippi. His family moved to Sandusky, Ohio during his childhood and he grew up in that city, attending Perkins High School.

The stout Kennedy played as a fullback in high school but never recorded gaudy offensive statistics. "I've always been a blocker," he told the Baltimore Sun in 1976. "I was a blocking fullback in high school — I never got a chance to run the ball because I was always blocking."

This ability would later prove a valuable career skill.

=== College career ===
Kennedy first enrolled at Hiram University, a small, private liberal arts school in Ohio where he studied sociology. He transferred to Colorado State University after only one semester, however.

Kennedy was a starter for Colorado state during the 1972 and 1973 seasons — his junior and senior years, respectively. Once again, Kennedy found himself mostly opening running lanes for teammates, this time as a tight end. "They didn't even know I could catch until my senior year, they had me blocking so much," he later recalled. He relished the role, noting, "I like to block — I figure it's just me one-on-one with the dude across the line."

During his time at CSU, Kennedy caught a total of 55 balls for 481 yards and 6 touchdowns. His performance as a senior earned him All-Western Athletic Conference honors in 1973.

=== Professional career ===
Kennedy was selected as a tight end by the Washington Redskins in the ninth round (233rd overall) of the 1974 NFL draft. The late-round pick's chances of catching with the club was threatened by the emergence of legal troubles during the summer. The case, an assault charge in Fort Collins, Colorado, stemmed from a fight in an intramural basketball game played shortly before Kennedy graduated from CSU, was expedited at the request of defense counsel due to the coming of NFL training camp. After a short bench trial, on July 2 Judge William Smoke ruled in favor of the plaintiff, sentencing Kennedy to a six-months in jail and a $500 fine — with the jail term and all but $150 of the fine suspended.

A photo of Kennedy's career-best 32-yard catch against Tampa Bay made the front page of the Baltimore Sun in 1976.

His legal difficulties behind him, Kennedy was able to attend Redskins training camp to attempt to make the newly-expanded 47-man roster. He was a rookie "on the bubble," ultimately released by the Redskins two days before the start of the 1974 season, however. The free agent subsequently signed a deal with the Chicago Fire of the World Football League (WFL) on October 11, 1974.

Kennedy saw action in four games for the Fire, starting at tight end, but the financially troubled team breached his contract, making him once again a free agent.

Kennedy signed with the NFL's Baltimore Colts on April 16, 1975, and made the team's roster as a backup for the rugged Raymond Chester. He appeared in every Colts game of the 1975 and 1976 seasons, playing primarily on special teams and as an extra blocker in short yardage situations.

Seldom used as an offensive weapon during his career, Kennedy scored his one career touchdown in 1975 against the Los Angeles Rams when he successfully grabbed a pass in the end zone from the 3-yard line. His career long came in 1976 against Tampa Bay, when he snagged a ball in heavy traffic from Colts quarterback Bill Troup and rambled for 32 yards, before being dragged down on the 5-yard line.

Always a solid blocker, Kennedy was also an effective special teams coverage player, making 7 tackles and 3 assists on kickoffs and punts during the 1976 season.

The league reduced its active roster from 47 players to 43 for the 1977 NFL season and Jimmie Kennedy was one of the victims of the change, falling on September 12, 1977, during the final round of cuts made by the Colts prior to the start of their season. His career was not quite done yet, however, as injury created opportunity and he was brought back by the team on October 20. Kennedy saw action in the last 9 games of the year.
