= 2009 Minnesota tornadoes =

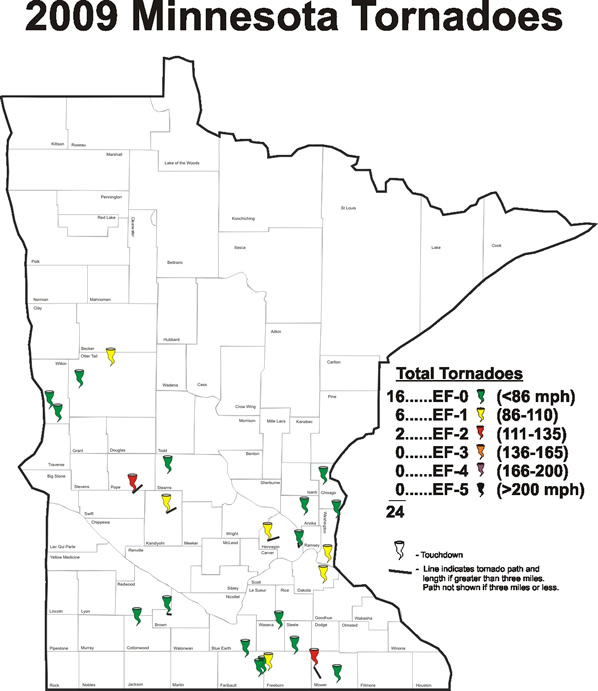
Map of the tornadoes that touched down in Minnesota during 2009

The following is a list of 2009 Minnesota tornadoes. Minnesota is a state located in the North Central United States along the northern edge of Tornado Alley, and on average receives 24 tornadoes per year. 2009 was an average year historically, with 24 confirmed tornado touchdowns. Twenty-two of the tornadoes (91%) were considered minor, rated EF0 or EF1 on the Enhanced Fujita scale. The remaining two tornadoes were rated as significant, at EF2.

The 24 tornadoes combined to cause $4.5 million in damage, and they did not cause any fatalities or injuries. The date range of the tornadoes was smaller than normal, lasting just over two months, from just June 17–August 19. The first tornado date of June 17 marked the third-latest-starting tornado season on record in Minnesota since 1950, behind only 1951 (June 19) and 1952 (June 23).

The most unusual tornado event of the year occurred on August 19. Seven tornadoes were recorded in Minnesota that day, including one that touched down in Minneapolis. What made this day unusual is that a unique atmospheric setup allowed several of the tornadoes to be spawned from rain showers where no lightning was present.

== Tornado descriptions ==
Confirmed tornadoes by Enhanced Fujita rating
EFU	EF0	EF1	EF2	EF3	EF4	EF5	Total
0	16	6	2	0	0	0	24

== June ==
=== June 17 ===
Radar animation of tornadoes over southern Minnesota on June 17, 2009.

A weak area of surface low pressure moved into extreme southeast North Dakota late on the afternoon of the June 17, with a warm front stretching across southeastern Minnesota. The warm front combined with pre-existing moisture from morning rainfall which led to rapid destabilization of the atmosphere during the afternoon hours. To the east of the low pressure area, surface dew point values rose into the middle 60s °F (18 °C) with temperatures near 80 °F (27 °C), causing a very unstable air mass to develop.

Two tornadoes were reported in west-central Minnesota in Wilkin County. Other, strong thunderstorms developed later just south of the warm front near Albert Lea and moved northeast. The thunderstorms quickly became tornadic north of Albert Lea, near Geneva, where a touchdown was observed. There were several reports of funnel clouds throughout the early evening with one more official touchdown near Waseca. The storms later turned to the southeast and impacted the Austin area, causing serious damage.

List of confirmed tornadoes (6) – Wednesday, June 17, 2009
EF#	Location	County	Coord.	Time (UTC)	Path length	Description/Damage
EF0	SSW of Doran	Wilkin	46.09°N 96.29°W	2140	.1 miles (0.16 km)	A brief tornado touchdown in an open field just east of U.S. Route 75 was reported. Peak winds were estimated at 80 miles per hour (129 km/h).
EF0	E of Tenney	Wilkin	46.02°N 96.23°W	2208	1 mile (1.6 km)	A brief tornado touchdown was reported near the Wilkin and Traverse County line. The tornado tracked for roughly a mile across open fields. Peak winds were estimated at 80 miles per hour (129 km/h).
EF0	SSW of Geneva	Freeborn	43.49°N 93.15°W	0030	1.8 miles (2.9 km)	Several trees and two sheds were damaged on the northeast corner of Interstate 35 and County Road 35, on the west edge of Geneva. There was minor tree damage associated with the tornado on the east side of Geneva, with the last damage just south of the intersection of County Roads 26 and 35. The tornado caused $1000 in damage.
EF2	Austin	Mower	43.43°N 93.01°W	0100	9.6 miles (15.4 km)	Tornado damage in Austin, Minnesota. A tornado caused damage on the north and northeast side of the city of Austin caused over $2 million in damage. Several power poles were snapped off or bent along Highway 218 on the north side of the city. Several metal work buildings were heavily damaged along 243rd St, along with numerous trees and some minor roof damage to nearby homes. Large debris, such as metal dumpsters, were tossed large distances. Several homes had minor damage, with numerous trees blown over or sheared off along 236th and 237th Street directly north of downtown Austin. There was considerable damage done in Todd Park, including athletic equipment, small buildings and hundreds of trees toppled and uprooted. The north side of the park, including the northern softball fields had the most damage. There was also considerable tree damage along 21st St NE or 555th Ave, which continued into the Austin Country Club. Minor damage was noted about a half mile east of the Austin airport and about 2 miles southeast of the airport. One minor injury was reported.
EF0	Adams	Mower	43.34°N 92.43°W	0151	.1 miles (0.16 km)	A brief tornado was witnessed by storm spotters.
EF0	E of Waseca	Waseca	44.04°N 93.26°W	0102	2.3 miles (3.7 km)	A tornado was observed forming just north of the City of Waseca on Clear Lake. The tornado moved onshore and then eastsouthward to Goose Lake. No property damage occurred but several large 14 inches (36 cm) diameter trees were uprooted when the tornado came onshore. Other broken trees were noted near Goose Lake.

=== June 18 ===
Moisture levels were high on June 18, with surface dew points in the middle 60s °F (18 °C). Some morning cloud cover along the North Dakota/South Dakota border lifted north by afternoon which allowed a period of heating. Although the upper-level winds were fairly light, another in a series of upper-level disturbances shifted over this region by mid-afternoon. This helped initiate thunderstorm development over southeast North Dakota and west central Minnesota, leading to two tornadoes near Carlisle and Dent.

List of confirmed tornadoes (2) – Thursday, June 18, 2009
EF#	Location	County	Coord.	Time (UTC)	Path length	Description/Damage
EF0	NW of Carlisle	Otter Tail	46.23°N 96.08°W	2350	3 miles (4.8 km)	Peak winds were estimated at 80 miles per hour (129 km/h).
EF1	NW of Dent	Otter Tail	46.33°N 95.43°W	0015	1 mile (1.6 km)	A tornado touched down briefly near Dent, knocking down several large trees and ripping the roof off the dugout at the baseball field. The tornado tracked for about 1 mile (1.6 km) and peak winds were estimated at 90 miles per hour (145 km/h).

=== June 21 ===
During the late afternoon a very warm and humid air mass lifted northward across northern Iowa and into far southern Minnesota. Several weak storms formed in northwest and north central Iowa and moved into south central Minnesota where a warm front laid. Winds shifted from the south to the east and southeast across Freeborn and Faribault counties of far south central Minnesota. The combination of increasing wind shear near the boundary layer and enough lift from thunderstorms allowed brief tornadoes to develop.

List of confirmed tornadoes (4) – Sunday, June 21, 2009
EF#	Location	County	Coord.	Time (UTC)	Path length	Description/Damage
EF0	NE of Easton	Faribault	43.47°N 93.54°W	0036	.1 miles (0.16 km)	Tree and garage damaged from brief touchdown at a farmstead. It caused $1,000 in damage.
EF0	W of Walters	Faribault	43.36°N 93.42°W	0108	.3 miles (0.48 km)	Tornado moved through a field, blew the lids off the top of two grain bins, then crossed Highway 22 and dissipated in a corn field. It caused $1,000 in damage.
EF0	NE of Walters	Faribault	43.37°N 93.39°W	0118	.1 miles (0.16 km)	Brief touchdown in open field.
EF1	W of Alden	Freeborn	43.39°N 93.37°W	0132	1.8 miles (2.9 km)	Tornado touched down briefly at 7:32 pm CST in an open field, then lifted up, and touched down again at 1935 CST. It moved across a corn field and into a farmstead, knocking down several trees and blowing away a garden bench. The tornado continued moving north into another corn field, where it dissipated.

== July ==
=== July 7 ===
Thunderstorms produced damaging winds, hail, and one tornado in Murray and Cottonwood Counties in southwest Minnesota on the late afternoon of July 7.

List of confirmed tornadoes (1) – Tuesday, July 7, 2009
EF#	Location	County	Coord.	Time (UTC)	Path length	Description/Damage
EF0	N of Storden	Cottonwood	44.07°N 95.19°W	2310	.2 miles (0.32 km)	A brief tornado with no reported damage.

=== July 14 ===
A strong cold front, deep moisture and a high wind shear environment led to severe weather across portions of central Minnesota during the late-afternoon hours. Several individual storms developed across west central Minnesota and moved quickly northeast; spawning three tornadoes.

List of confirmed tornadoes (3) – Tuesday, July 14, 2009
EF#	Location	County	Coord.	Time (UTC)	Path length	Description/Damage
EF2	Swift Falls	Swift and Pope	45.24°N 95.24°W	2121	7.9 miles (12.7 km)	A tornado moved through portions of Swift and Pope Counties in west central Minnesota where two turkey barns and several outbuildings were destroyed, with extensive tree damage throughout the entire path. Maximum damage was EF-2 with estimated winds of 111 miles per hour (179 km/h) – 119 miles per hour (192 km/h). In the town of Swift Falls, two residences were damaged along with two garages that were destroyed. The tornado produced minor crop damage northeast of Swift Falls. In all this tornado produced approximately $510,000 in damage.
EF1	Spicer	Kandiyohi	45.12°N 94.58°W	2141	6.4 miles (10.3 km)	A home damaged near Spicer. A tornado moved through portions of Kandiyohi County near the town of Spicer. Portions of downtown Spicer were damaged including the partial destruction of the upper level of a home, there was roof damage to multiple houses, several outbuildings were destroyed, and a dozen or more car windows blown out at the local Green Mall parking lot. Maximum winds were estimated between 100 miles per hour (161 km/h) to 110 miles per hour (177 km/h) and $250,000 in damage was reported.
EF0	NW of Elrosa	Stearns	45.34°N 94.59°W	2207	.1 miles (0.16 km)	Brief touchdown in an open field – no damage.

== August ==
=== August 8 ===
A very unstable air mass was in place across the upper Midwest with a warm front draped from the Twin Cities area into west-central Wisconsin. A strong capping inversion suppressed thunderstorm development until near sunset, when a supercell thunderstorm developed in the western part of Hennepin County ahead of an advancing cold front near a surface low pressure center. The supercell would produce a tornado in Hennepin county before tracking eastward across the northern Twin Cities metro area and into Wisconsin where it produced two more tornadoes.

List of confirmed tornadoes (1) – Tuesday, August 8, 2009
EF#	Location	County	Coord.	Time (UTC)	Path length	Description/Damage
EF1	Minnetrista, Orono, Long Lake, Plymouth	Hennepin	44.57°N 93.40°W	0023	9.1 miles (14.6 km)	Radar loop of the tornado-producing supercell over Hennepin County. A tornado touched down in the Northeastern portion of Minnetrista shortly before 8:00 pm CDT. The tornado began in the Southwestern corner of County Rd. 110 and County Road 151. Several large trees were uprooted or sheared off in this region, with some minor damage incurred to local residences. The tornado headed East-Northeast across Orono, hitting the edge of Stubbs Bay in Lake Minnetonka. A boat was thrown into Stubbs Bay and sunk. The tornado moved into the city of Long Lake and back into the Northeastern part of Orono before trekking over the Southwestern portion of Plymouth. The tornado finally terminated near Garland and 25th in the Southwestern portion of Plymouth. There was additional damage from Orono to Southwestern Plymouth, including shingles ripped from residential and commercial roofs, large trees uprooted and tree limbs or trunks sheared away. A liquor store sign was also destroyed in Long Lake. The length of this tornado was 9.5 miles with a maximum width of approximately 200 yards and it caused $1 million in damage.

=== August 19 ===
Low pressure was moving into Minnesota from the west-southwest on Wednesday, August 19, causing a large area of shower activity to shroud east-central and south-central Minnesota during the morning and early-afternoon hours. The low began to deepen rapidly in the late morning and early afternoon as it moved northeast over the Twin Cities metro area.

Embedded circulations began to develop within the shower activity by 2:00 pm CDT, when the deepening low started to produce strong atmospheric wind speeds which were turning in the lower portion of the atmosphere. These circulations were moving quickly to the north and many were not associated with thunderstorms; there were only a handful of cloud-to-ground lightning strikes all afternoon in the areas where damage was reported.

While there was relatively little instability, there was enough rising air and surface inflow to stretch these circulations at times and form short-lived tornadoes.

List of confirmed tornadoes (7) – Tuesday, August 19, 2009
EF#	Location	County	Coord.	Time (UTC)	Path length	Description/Damage
EF0	Minneapolis	Hennepin	44.54°N 93.15°W	1850	4.3 miles (6.9 km)	Damage to homes in South Minneapolis A tornado touched down in south Minneapolis near East 53rd Street and Park Avenue around 1:50 pm CDT. The tornado moved north from that location toward downtown Minneapolis and eventually lifted near the Minneapolis Convention Center around 2:00 pm CDT. Damage was most intense and concentrated from East 45th Street north to East 38th Street, generally along Park, Oakland, Portland, and 5th Avenues. The tornado's track shifted slightly west of due north with time. The most intense damage was consistent with EF-0 intensity, with wind speeds between 75 miles per hour (121 km/h) and 85 miles per hour (137 km/h). Numerous trees were downed in the area, with damage to a number of homes and structures as well. Much of the structural damage was due to falling trees. The tornado track was approximately 4.5 miles (7.2 km) in length, although it may have lifted for a brief time between East 29th Street and the Convention Center area. Maximum track width was approximately 500 yards (457 m), although the most intense damage occurred along a path approximately 250 yards (229 m) wide. This tornado caused $500,000 in damage.
EF1	SE of New Trier	Dakota	44.34°N 92.54°W	1916	1.6 miles (2.6 km)	A roof was completely torn off a farm house, and several large sheds and outbuildings were destroyed. The tornado tracked through corn fields, from south-southeast to the north-northwest and caused $75,000 in damage to property and crops.
EF1	Cottage Grove	Washington	44.46°N 92.51°W	1940	.7 miles (1.1 km)	An EF-1 tornado tracked from near U.S. Route 61 and 122nd Street South, to near Lehigh Avenue South on the far southeast periphery of Cottage Grove. The majority of the damage occurred in the 11700 block of Lockridge Avenue. This is where the tornado was rated an EF-1 based on large trees uprooted and winds estimated near 90 miles per hour (145 km/h). Other structural damage in the residential area included a garage door collapsed inward, wooden fences were blown down, and a metal shed blew across the street.
EF0	Ham Lake	Anoka	45.15°N 93.12°W	2007	.1 miles (0.16 km)	Brief tornado touchdown in an unpopulated section of Ham Lake.
EF0	Marine on St. Croix	Washington	45.12°N 92.46°W	2025	.7 miles (1.1 km)	Scattered trees and large limbs were downed as a tornado moved from southeast to northwest across western sections of Marine on St. Croix.
EF0	North Branch	Chisago	45.31°N 92.58°W	2100	.9 miles (1.4 km)	An EF-0 tornado tracked from near the North Branch Middle School, northwest to near Rivercrest and Riverview Courts in North Branch, Minnesota. Roof damage was indicated at the middle school, with a telephone pole snapped, and major trees blown down in the residential area. Based on roof damage and trees blown down, winds were estimated at 70 miles per hour (113 km/h) to 80 miles per hour (129 km/h).
EF0	SE of Springfield	Brown	44.13°N 94.51°W	2328	3.7 miles (6.0 km)	Occasional brief tornado touchdowns between Springfield and Leavenworth, Minnesota for approximately 15 minutes produced $25,000 in crop damage.

== See also ==
- List of 2008 Minnesota tornadoes
- Climate of Minnesota
- List of North American tornadoes and tornado outbreaks
