= Nomination whist =

Nomination whist may refer to:

- Nomination whist (oh hell variant), one of several names for the international card game oh hell
- Nomination whist, another name for the British card game of clag
- Nomination whist, another name for the British card game of noms, nommie or small ships rules
