= School paste =

Adhesive used for crafts in schools

School paste is a paste or glue used in schools for art and crafts.

Generally it is a non-toxic starch-based paste such as wheatpaste also called flour and water paste, although PVA glues are also often used.

Well-known brands include:

Australia:

- Perkins Paste
- Clag (glue)

United States:

- Elmer's glue
