= List of 2008 Minnesota tornadoes =

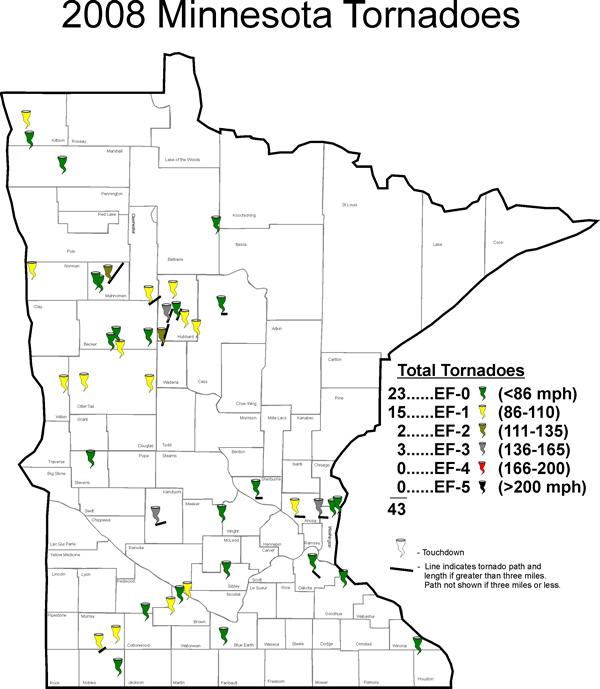
Map of the tornadoes that touched down in Minnesota during 2008

The following is a list of 2008 Minnesota tornadoes. Minnesota is a state located in the North Central United States along the northern edge of Tornado Alley, and on average receives 24 tornadoes per year. 2008 was a more active year historically, with 43 confirmed tornado touchdowns. Thirty-eight of the tornadoes (or 88%) were considered minor, rated EF0 or EF1 on the Enhanced Fujita scale. The remaining five tornadoes were rated as significant, at EF2 or EF3.

The 43 tornadoes combined to cause $42.7 million in damage: $40.06 million in property damage and $2.66 million in crop damage. The tornadoes combined to injure 24 people, with one fatality reported from an EF3 tornado in Hugo on May 25. The date range of the tornadoes was smaller than normal, lasting exactly two months, from just May 25–July 24.

== Confirmed tornadoes ==
Confirmed tornadoes by Enhanced Fujita rating
EFU	EF0	EF1	EF2	EF3	EF4	EF5	Total
0	23	15	2	3	0	0	43

== May ==
=== May 25 ===
List of confirmed tornadoes (5) – Sunday, May 25, 2008
EF#	Location	County	Coord.	Time (UTC)	Path length	Damage
EF1	Coon Rapids, Blaine	Anoka	45.12°N 93.2°W	2135	6 miles (9.7 km)	2 injuries – Damaged many trees and homes in the northern suburbs of the Twin Cities. Caused $700,000 in damages.
EF3	Lino Lakes/ Hugo	Anoka, Washington	45.1°N 93.3°W	2155	6 miles (9.7 km)	Damage to homes from the EF3 tornado in Hugo, Minnesota. See also: Late-May 2008 tornado outbreak sequence 1 death, 17 injuries – The tornado touched down in Anoka County in the town of Lino Lakes before crossing into Washington County. It quickly strengthened to an EF3, where it caused severe damage in the town of Hugo, killing a 2-year-old boy. The Creekview Preserve subdivision was especially hard hit. A 62-year-old woman died a few days after the tornado when she suffered a heart attack while clearing debris in her yard. This tornado destroyed 27 homes and damaged 767 others, causing $25.3 million in damage.
EF0	SW of Marine on St. Croix	Washington	45.1°N 92.49°W	2210	1 mile (1.6 km)	Hundreds of trees damaged at Warner Nature Reserve with a park building slightly damaged.
EF0	Marine on St. Croix	Washington, St. Croix (WI), Polk (WI)	45.12°N 92.46°W	2215	1.3 miles (2.1 km)	Several homes were damaged by fallen trees in Marine on St. Croix along the St. Croix River, resulting in $300,000 in damage.
EF0	N of Whipholt	Cass	47.04°N 94.22°W	2248	4 miles (6.4 km)	Waterspout over Leech Lake.

=== May 30 ===
List of confirmed tornadoes (1) – Friday, May 30, 2008
EF#	Location	County	Coord.	Time (UTC)	Path length	Damage
EF0	WNW of Morris	Stevens	45.12°N 93.2°W	2037	.1 miles (0.2 km)	None reported.

== June ==
=== June 6 ===
List of confirmed tornadoes (5) – Friday, June 6, 2008
EF#	Location	County	Coord.	Time (UTC)	Path length	Damage
EF2	Menahga, Park Rapids area	Wadena, Hubbard	46.45°N 95.04°W	1414	14.1 miles (22.7 km)	Damage to turkey barns from the June 6, 2008 tornado 2 injuries – Eight turkey barns, several homes, and hundreds of acres (km^{2}) of forest were damaged or destroyed. Damage total was $11.3 million
EF3	Dorset, Emmaville area	Hubbard	46.58°N 95.01°W	1437	7.3 miles (11.7 km)	Damage caused by the EF3 Emmaville, Minnesota tornado Destroyed two homes and damaged several others on Pickerel Lake. Also flattened dozens of acres of forest.
EF0	Dorset area	Hubbard	46.59°N 95.55°W	1451	5.9 miles (9.5 km)	Caused $100,000 in several brief touchdowns.
EF1	Lake George area	Hubbard	47.09°N 94.59°W	1455	2.4 miles (3.9 km)	Numerous large trees were knocked down, causing $400,000 in damage.
EF1	Badoura, Chamberlain area	Hubbard	46.51°N 94.43°W	1543	.6 miles (1.0 km)	Up to four acres of trees were downed, causing $200,000 in damage.

=== June 7 ===
List of confirmed tornadoes (1) – Saturday, June 7, 2008
EF#	Location	County	Coord.	Time (UTC)	Path length	Damage
EF0	Perkins area	Houston	43.49°N 91.40°W	2150	.1 miles (0.2 km)	None reported.

=== June 9 ===
List of confirmed tornadoes (1) – Monday, June 9, 2008
EF#	Location	County	Coord.	Time (UTC)	Path length	Damage
EF1	Halstad area	Norman	47.21°N 96.45°W	1844	.3 miles (0.5 km)	$40,000 to farm building and trees reported.

=== June 11 ===
List of confirmed tornadoes (7) – Wednesday, June 11, 2008
EF#	Location	County	Coord.	Time (UTC)	Path length	Damage
EF1	Pfingsten, Wirock area	Nobles, Murray	43.50°N 95.45°W	2246	3.8 miles (6.1 km)	Caused $70,000 to farm building and trees.
EF1	Lime Creek area	Murray	43.54°N 95.36°W	2305	2.7 miles (4.3 km)	1 injury – This tornado tore the roof off a farm house, causing a wall to collapse and injuring one person. Two building were also destroyed and others damaged at the same farm, causing $100,000 in damage.
EF0	Jeffers area	Cottonwood	44.07°N 95.11°W	2345	2 miles (3.2 km)	Minor damage to outbuildings and trees totaling $5,000.
EF1	Leavenworth area	Brown	44.12°N 94.52°W	0020	.6 miles (1.0 km)	This tornado destroyed two barns, a farm truck and several vehicles, damage totaling $300,000.
EF0	Sleepy Eye area	Brown	44.19°N 94.45°W	0046	.4 miles (0.6 km)	This tornado caused $100,000 to farm buildings.
EF1	Essig area	Brown	44.21°N 94.40°W	0052	2 miles (3.2 km)	Destroyed a grain bin, along with a few sheds and outbuildings, totaling $100,000.
EF0	Gaylord area	Sibley	44.34°N 94.10°W	0206	.3 miles (0.5 km)	None reported.

=== June 12 ===
List of confirmed tornadoes (3) – Thursday, June 12, 2008
EF#	Location	County	Coord.	Time (UTC)	Path length	Damage
EF0	Midway area	Becker	46.45°N 95.01°W	2340	1.8 miles (2.9 km)	Caused a reported $100,000 in crop damages.
EF1	Nevis area	Hubbard	46.55°N 95.51°W	0014	1.5 miles (2.4 km)	Several large trees were knocked down or uprooted along county road 13, causing $300,000 in property damage and $100,000 in crop damage.
EF1	Two Inlets, Lake George area	Becker, Clearwater, Hubbard	47.06°N 95.17°W	0144	8.5 miles (13.7 km)	Numerous trees were knocked down along Minnesota State Highway 113. This tornado caused $200,000 in property damage and $100,000 in crop damage.

=== June 14 ===
List of confirmed tornadoes (2) – Thursday, June 14, 2008
EF#	Location	County	Coord.	Time (UTC)	Path length	Damage
EF1	Foxhome area	Wilkin	46.18°N 96.21°W	2255	2.1 miles (3.4 km)	This tornado moved a machine shed off its foundation, and downed several large trees. It caused $150,000 in property damage and $100,000 in crop damage.
EF1	Fergus Falls	Otter Tail	46.18°N 96.07°W	2315	2.6 miles (4.2 km)	The tornado skirted along the northeast corner of Fergus Falls, knocking over power lines and numerous tree branches. It caused $100,000 in property damage and $50,000 in crop damage.

== July ==
=== July 6 ===
List of confirmed tornadoes (1) – Sunday, July 6, 2008
EF#	Location	County	Coord.	Time (UTC)	Path length	Damage
EF0	Round Lake area	Nobles	43.34°N 95.03°W	2017	.3 miles (0.5 km)	None reported.

=== July 10 ===
List of confirmed tornadoes (2) – Thursday, July 10, 2008
EF#	Location	County	Coord.	Time (UTC)	Path length	Damage
EF0	Empire	Dakota	44.39°N 93.04°W	1815	6 miles (9.7 km)	Damage to trees and $200,000 to crops was reported.
EF0	Vasa area	Goodhue	44.30°N 92.39°W	1840	1 mile (1.6 km)	Minor structural damage reported.

=== July 11 ===
List of confirmed tornadoes (9) – Friday, July 11, 2008
EF#	Location	County	Coord.	Time (UTC)	Path length	Damage
EF0	Viking area	Marshall	48.15°N 96.27°W	2025	.2 miles (0.3 km)	None reported.
EF0	Waubun	Mahnomen	47.13°N 95.58°W	2045	2 miles (3.2 km)	A total of $10,000 in damage was reported to property and crops.
EF0	Vergas	Otter Tail	46.42°N 95.46°W	2055	.2 miles (0.3 km)	A total of $10,000 in damage was reported to property and crops.
EF2	Beaulieu	Mahnomen	47.18°N 95.49°W	2100	16 miles (25.7 km)	Numerous trees and power poles were snapped along the tornado's path. Farm equipment was damaged. $500,000 in property damage and $100,000 in crop damage was reported.
EF0	Frazee, Wolf Lake area	Becker	46.45°N 95.37°W	2112	10 miles (16.1 km)	This tornado downed several large trees, causing $25,000 in crop and property damage.
EF1	Luce, Perham area	Otter Tail	46.40°N 95.40°W	2115	2 miles (3.2 km)	Several farm buildings and equipment was damaged, causing $200,000 in property damage and $100,000 in crop damage.
EF1	Lyman, Wrightstown area	Otter Tail	46.18°N 95.15°W	2143	1 mile (1.6 km)	This tornado caused $50,000 in damage to property and crops.
EF3	Priam, Kandiyohi area	Kandiyohi	45.04°N 94.58°W	2326	8 miles (12.9 km)	EF3 tornado damage near Willmar. 2 injuries – Three homes were destroyed and eight others damaged. Barns and sheds were also destroyed, including two turkey barns.
EF0	Dassel, Knapp area	Meeker, Wright	45.07°N 94.16°W	0025	3 miles (4.8 km)	Damage to a home, sheds and trees totaled $200,000.

=== July 14 ===
List of confirmed tornadoes (1) – Monday, July 14, 2008
EF#	Location	County	Coord.	Time (UTC)	Path length	Damage
EF0	Funkley area	Beltrami	47.46°N 94.27°W	0245	.2 miles (0.3 km)	Minor tree damage reported.

=== July 16 ===
List of confirmed tornadoes (2) – Wednesday, July 16, 2008
EF#	Location	County	Coord.	Time (UTC)	Path length	Damage
EF1	Pittsburg, ND, Donaldson area	Pembina, Kittson	48.37°N 97.04°W	0132	4 miles (6.4 km)	Minor damage reported, totaling $10,000.
EF0	Stephen area	Marshall	48.30°N 96.54°W	0200	1 mile (1.6 km)	This tornado caused $20,000 in crop damage and $10,000 to buildings.

=== July 17 ===
List of confirmed tornadoes (1) – Thursday, July 17, 2008
EF#	Location	County	Coord.	Time (UTC)	Path length	Damage
EF0	Amboy	Blue Earth	43.52°N 94.10°W	1655	.1 miles (0.2 km)	None reported.

=== July 19 ===
List of confirmed tornadoes (1) – Saturday, July 19, 2008
EF#	Location	County	Coord.	Time (UTC)	Path length	Damage
EF0	Becker, Big Lake area	Sherburne	45.22°N 93.50°W	1907	4.4 miles (7.1 km)	Minor damage to trees and houses, as well as $300,000 in crop damage reported.

=== July 24 ===
List of confirmed tornadoes (1) – Thursday, July 24, 2008
EF#	Location	County	Coord.	Time (UTC)	Path length	Damage
EF0	Waubun area	Mahnomen	47.15°N 95.55°W	2320	1 mile (1.6 km)	Small tornado caused $5,000 in crop damage.

== See also ==
- 2009 Minnesota tornadoes
- Climate of Minnesota
- List of North American tornadoes and tornado outbreaks
