= Ahmed Ajaj =

Palestinian participant in the 1993 WTC bombing

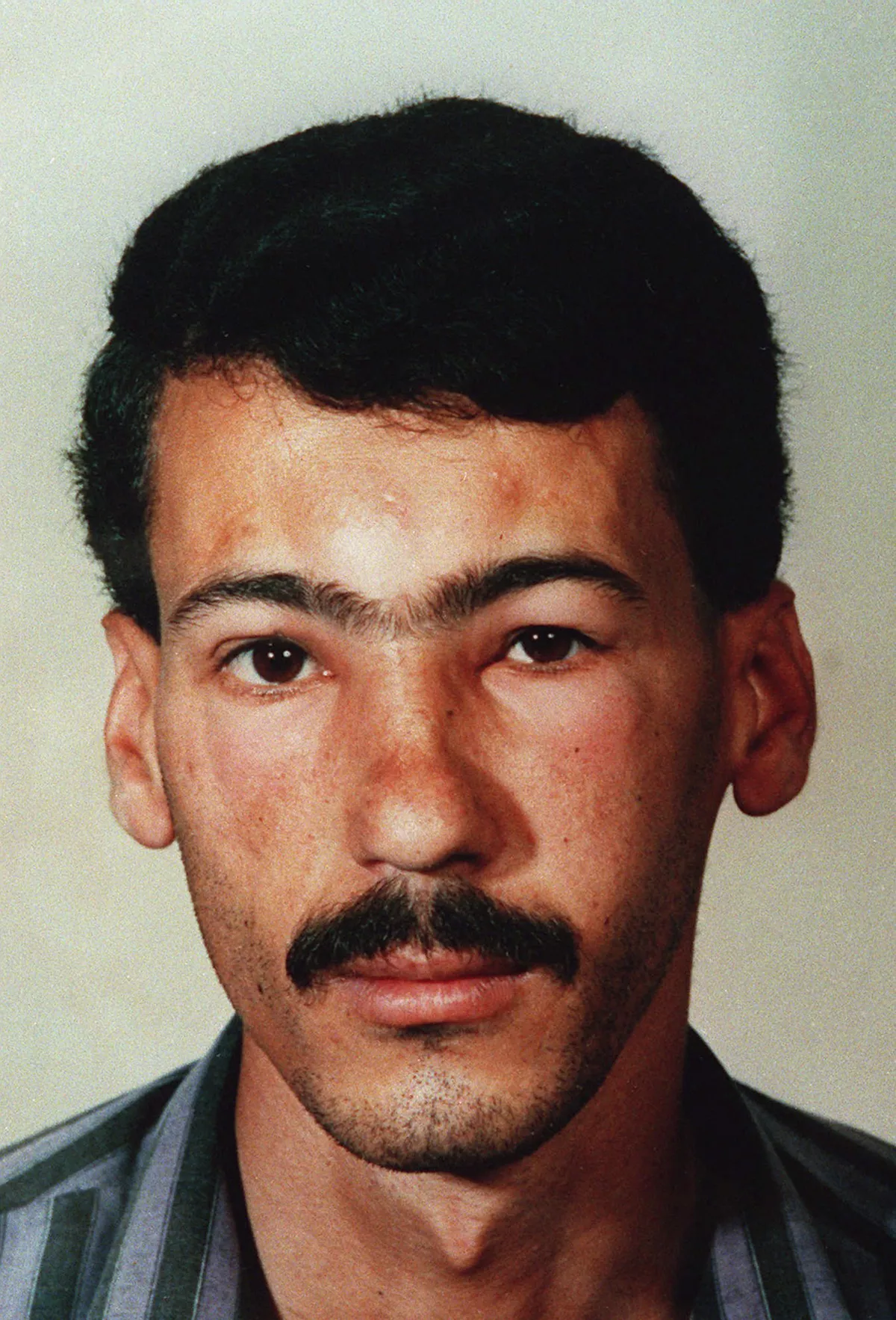
- Ajaj in 1991
- Born: 1966 (age 59–60); Jordan-annexed West Bank
- Known for: 1993 World Trade Center bombing
- Status: Incarcerated
- Convictions: Conspiracy to bomb a building used in interstate and foreign commerce Conspiracy to bomb property and vehicles owned, used, and leased by an agency of the United States; Conspiracy to transport explosives in interstate commerce Conspiracy to bomb or destroy a vehicle used in interstate commerce resulting in death (2 counts); Conspiracy to assault federal officers Conspiracy to use and carry a destructive device during a crime of violence Conspiracy to traveling and using facilities in interstate and/or foreign commerce to commit crimes of violence
- Penalty: 240 years imprisonment; commuted to 84 years and 10 months imprisonment

Details
- Imprisoned at: USP Victorville

Ahmed Mohammad Ajaj (Arabic: أحمد محمد عجاج; born 1966) is a Palestinian convicted terrorist, who is known for participating in the 1993 World Trade Center bombing. He is currently serving an 84-year sentence at USP Terre Haute for taking part in the bombing.

== Early life ==
Ajaj was born in the West Bank and immigrated to Houston, Texas.

== Training for terrorist attacks ==
On April 24, 1992, abandoning his first asylum claim, Ajaj flew from New York to Peshawar, Pakistan, using the alias Ibrahim Salameh, from there to Camp Khalden on the Afghanistan-Pakistan border. Lacking necessary credentials, Ajaj was sent to Saudi Arabia to obtain a letter of recommendation.

On May 16, 1992, he flew to Saudi Arabia via the United Arab Emirates where he procured a letter of introduction requesting the leader of Camp Khalden provide the bearer with training in the use of weapons and explosives. Ajaj returned to Pakistan via the UAE, arriving June 14, 1992, and began the bomb building course.

== Return to U.S. ==
On August 31, 1992, using the services of a Pakistani travel agent, Ahmad Ajaj and Ramzi Yousef boarded Pakistan International Airlines flight 703 in Peshawar and flew to Karachi, Pakistan, then on to Kennedy Airport in New York City, flying first class during both legs of the trip, believing they would receive less scrutiny.

Ajaj and Yousef together had five passports and numerous documents supporting their aliases: a Saudi passport showing signs of alteration, an Iraqi passport bought from a Pakistani official, a photo-substituted Swedish passport, a photo-substituted British passport, a Jordanian passport, identification cards, bank records, education records, medical records, and manuals published by the World Assembly of Muslim Youth.

On September 1, 1992, at Kennedy airport, Ajaj was sent to secondary immigration inspection, where he claimed he was a member of the Swedish press, travelling as Khurram Khan with an International Student Identification card and a falsified Swedish passport. It is unknown whether Ajaj was meant to cause a scene as a distraction to let Yousef slip through, or legitimately lost his temper, but he shouted at the inspector: "My mother was Swedish! If you don't believe me check your computer." The passport was legitimate, belonging to a Swedish citizen who had attended a training camp in Pakistan and surrendered his identity cards to those who ran the camp, but Ajaj had used simple school paste to plaster his own photograph over that of the legitimate owner.

In Ajaj's luggage INS inspector Mark Cozine and Robert Malafronte found the Saudi passport, altered Jordanian passport, with supporting documents for both; a plane ticket and British passport in the name of Mohammed Azan, bomb-making manuals, videos and other materials on assembling weapons and explosives, letters referencing his attendance at terrorist training camps; anti-American and anti-Israeli materials, instructions on document forgery, and two rubber stamp devices to alter the seal on passports issued from Saudi Arabia. One of the manuals, written in 1982, seven years before the group was founded, was entitled al-Qaeda (“The Base” or “The Foundation”) and was more widely reported after the group came to prominence. An INS supervisor informed the FBI Terrorist Task Force which declined to get involved but requested copies of the file. The Bureau of Alcohol, Tobacco and Firearms was notified but was "not interested."

Yousef was also sent to secondary immigration inspection for lacking a passport or a visa that would allow him to enter U.S. He presented an Iraqi passport he said he bought from a Pakistani official for $100 or more (up to $2700 in one report), adding that the passport was fraudulent. Yousef claimed he was fleeing Saddam Hussein and needed asylum, that he had been recently beaten by Iraqi soldiers in Kuwait because they thought he was a member of a Kuwaiti guerilla organization. INS inspector Martha Morales also found in his possession a boarding pass in the name of Mohammed Azan, and an identity card, from Al-Bunyan Islamic Center in Arizona, with Yousef's photo and the name Khurram Khan, under which Ajaj had traveled into the U.S. Yousef had signed the back of the card as Ramzi Ahmed Yousef.

Yousef had checks from Lloyds Bank of London and an address book listing what Morales later called "unusual places [in America] for someone to visit whom had just come from halfway around the world." Fingerprinted and photographed, his passport was confiscated. Morales said Yousef spoke excellent English with a British accent, admitted his real name Ramzi Yousef and said he was born in UAE in 1967, and was a citizen of Pakistan. Her Supervisor overruled Morales's recommendation to detain Yousef on grounds the INS detention center was full - even though Yousef had committed acts of immigration fraud (travelling under three different identities and lying to an INS official), and also given inspectors evidence linking him to Ahmad Ajaj. With intermingled documents and both men in secondary inspection, still Yousef was not linked to Ajaj. He made a claim for political asylum and was released in the United States pending a hearing.

Ajaj's terrorist kit, counterfeit entry stamp, and outburst were all decoys intended to deflect INS attention away from Yousef and facilitate Yousef's processing - a premeditated plan intended to exploit routine activities of busy INS inspectors. After more than 8 hours of questioning, at 5:00 a.m. September 2, 1992, INS handed Ajaj to Wackenhut Correctional Corporation for incarceration in a converted warehouse in Queens.

Ajaj's passport revealed his June 15, 1992, Pakistani entry stamp was counterfeit. Ajaj told authorities he had a political asylum claim from a prior entry in February 1992, and was detained pending a hearing. Ajaj later pleaded guilty to use of an altered passport and served six months in prison. Yousef never appeared for his hearing.

== Participation from prison ==
Incarcerated from September 2, 1992, Ajaj remained in contact with Yousef and other co-conspirators and continued to be involved in the World Trade Center bombing plot. Ajaj never contacted Yousef directly. Calls were patched through "Big 5 Hamburgers" in Dallas, rendering law enforcement detection more difficult. The calls were not translated until long after the WTC bombing.

Beginning on December 4, 1992 (and later on December 29, 1992), Yousef placed a series of calls to Ajaj's lawyer in New York and to Ajaj's friend in Texas. Later that same day, a call from Ajaj was transferred to Yousef, permitting the two to speak directly. In the conversation, Ajaj immediately brought up the terrorist kit informing Yousef that the Court had ordered the government to return Ajaj's belongings. When Yousef asked if he could take possession of Ajaj's things, Ajaj readily agreed at first, but then said that it was not a good idea for Yousef personally to obtain the materials from the government because it might jeopardize Yousef's "business", which, Ajaj said, would be "a pity!"

Ajaj was released from prison March 1, 1993 – three days after the WTC bombing. He was rearrested in connection with the attack March 9, 1993, and his asylum request was denied on April 24, 1993. In jail at the time of the WTC bombing, Ajaj was convicted of having played a role "in the early stages of the conspiracy" and convicted of nine counts, sentenced to 240 years, fined $250,000, and ordered to pay 250 million dollars in restitution.

Ajaj did not give up on his political asylum claim. He petitioned for a new attorney and an exclusion hearing – held to determine whether someone is admissible in the U.S. – in Houston, where he had filed his original political asylum claim. Ajaj's request was denied April 24, 1993, on grounds that a passport holder from a visa waiver country who uses a fraudulent passport (Ajaj had used a bogus Swedish passport) is not entitled to such a hearing. Not satisfied with that outcome, Ajaj asked to file a new political asylum claim and was given ten days by an immigration judge to do so. Thus, Ajaj was able to file a political asylum claim after his arrest for involvement in the WTC bombing.

A 2011 NPR report claimed he was imprisoned in a highly restrictive Communication Management Unit.

As of 2025, Ajaj is at USP Victorville with BOP number 40637-053. In 2021, one of Ajaj's convictions was overturned, reducing his sentence by 30 years.

== Lung cancer ==
In the late 1990s Ajaj was diagnosed with lung cancer. The U.S. Bureau of Prisons moved him to a medical facility, where he had surgery to remove the cancerous lung and received radiation treatment. He has filed scores of grievances and several lawsuits against the U.S. prison system, alleging everything from interference with his mail to denial of access to lawyers, and violations of his Eighth Amendment rights.

Ajaj was the only remaining plaintiff in a lawsuit by federal prisoners alleging harm from secondhand smoke seeping through the air filtration system at SuperMax.
