= Mark Perkins =

Mark Perkins may refer to:

- Mark Perkins (footballer) (born 1964), Australian rules footballer
- Mark L. Perkins (born 1949), former president of Towson University
- Vince Perkins (Mark Vincent Perkins, born 1981), baseball player
- Merk (musician) (Mark Perkins, born 1994), New Zealand musician

== See also ==
- Perkins (disambiguation)
