= Swift Falls, Minnesota =

Swift Falls
- Unincorporated community
- Location within Minnesota Location within the United States
- Coordinates: 45°23′56″N 95°25′26″W
- Country: United States
- State: Minnesota
- County: Swift
- Elevation: 1,119 ft (341 m)
- Time zone: UTC-6 (Central (CST))
  - Summer (DST): UTC-5 (CDT)
- Area code: 320
- GNIS feature ID: 652954

Swift Falls is an unincorporated community in Swift County, in the U.S. state of Minnesota.

== Geography ==
Swift Falls is located along the Chippewa River. The community contains the Swift Falls Park.

== History ==
A post office called Swift Falls was established in 1873, and remained in operation until 1910.

A tornado touched down in Swift Falls on July 14, 2009, destroying several buildings.
