= Perkins Local School District =

School district in Ohio, United States

Address
- 3714 Campbell Street Suite B Sandusky, Ohio, 44870; United States

District information
- Type: Public
- Grades: PK–12
- Schools: 4
- NCES District ID: 3904681

Students and staff
- Students: 1,868 (2024–2025)
- Teachers: 107.46 (on an FTE basis) (2024–2025)
- Staff: 263.85 (on an FTE basis) (2024–2025)
- Student–teacher ratio: 17.38 (2024–2025)

Other information
- Website: www.perkinsschools.org

Perkins Local School District is a public school district serving students in Perkins Township near the city of Sandusky in Erie County, Ohio, United States. The school district enrolls 2,370 students as of the 2007–2008 academic year. They started around 1960 with Perkins High School, then came Meadowlawn Intermediate School. Next came Briar Middle School, lastly, Fury Elementary. Depending on your school, the times are different for Briar and the High school. Your days consist of 8 am to 2 pm. For Fury and Meadowlawn, you start at 9:05-ish and end at 3:25.

== Schools ==
=== Elementary school ===
- Furry Elementary School (Grades K through 2nd)

=== Intermediate School ===
- Meadowlawn Intermediate School (Grades 3rd through 5th)

=== Middle schools ===
- Perkins (Briar) Middle School (Grades 6th through 8th)

=== High schools ===
- Perkins High School (Grades 9th through 12th)
