= Wilson Museum =

Museum in Castine, Maine, United States

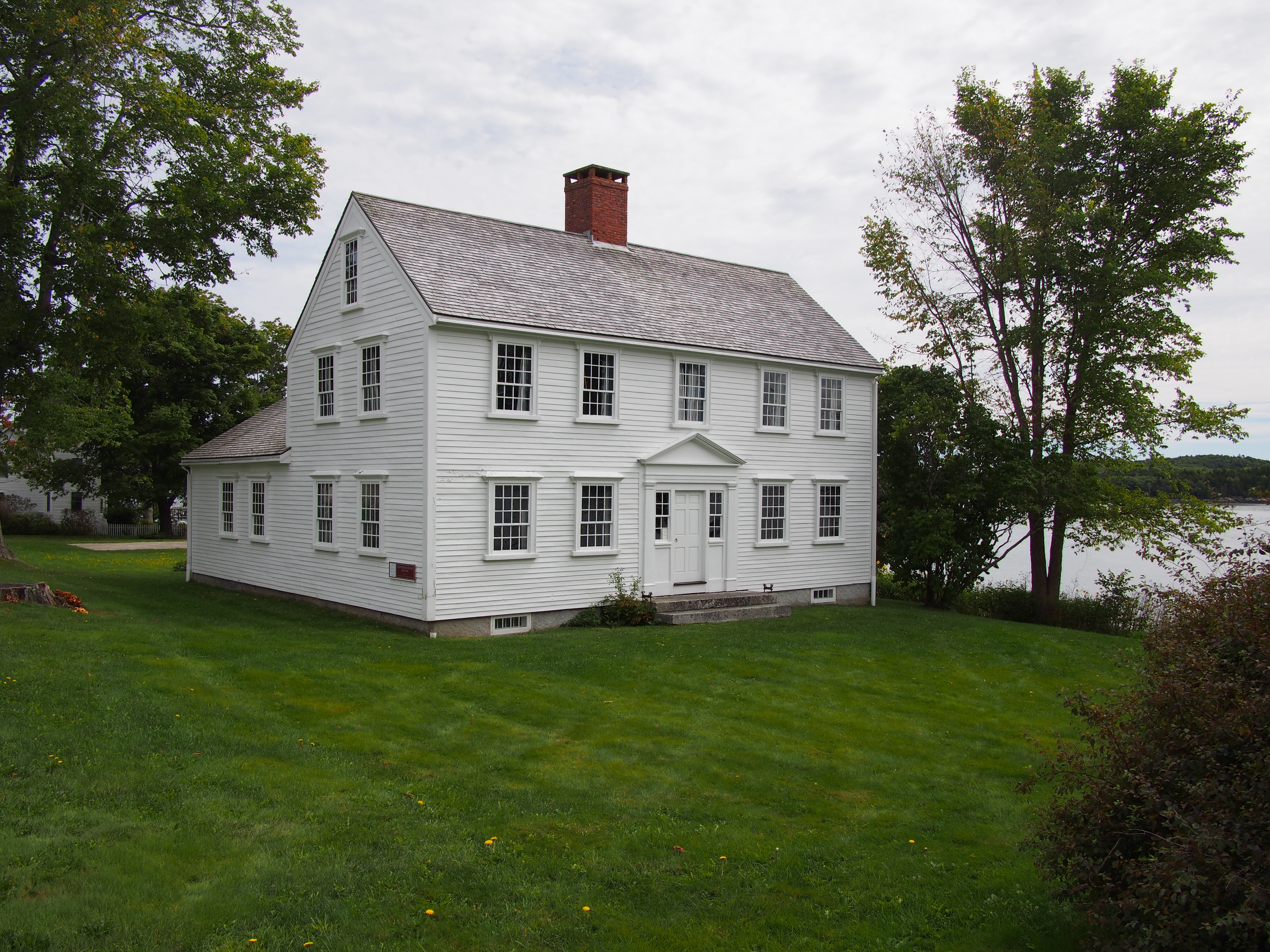
- The John Perkins House
- Established: 1921
- Location: 107 Perkins Street; Castine, Maine
- Coordinates: 44°23′02″N 68°48′22″W
- Type: Natural history, history
- Website: www.wilsonmuseum.org

The Wilson Museum is a museum in Castine, Maine, United States. It was founded using the collection of Dr John Howard Wilson, a geologist.

== History ==
Wilson lived in Philadelphia, Brooklyn and Nantucket during his youth. He arrived at Castine in 1891 with his mother, Cassine Cartwright Wilson. He received a PhD in geology from Columbia University.

In 1921, Mrs Wilson gave the western part of the land she owned to build a museum for John Wilson's collections. The building was designed by architects Milton See & Son of New York. and is listed on the National Register of Historic Places. Three other buildings were added in the late 1960s, the Blacksmith Shop, Hearse House, and the John Perkins House.

== Collections ==
- Rocks, minerals, shells.
- Pre-historic artifacts from North and South America.
- Exhibits from Europe and Africa illustrating the development of tools during the early Paleolithic, Neolithic, Bronze and Iron Ages.
- Six dioramas constructed by Ned Burns of the American Museum of Natural History in 1926.
- Cultures of Africa, Oceania, North and South America.
- Early weapons and firearms.
- Local history.
- Ship models.
- 19th century carpenter's tools, farm and household equipment.
- Special exhibits every summer using the museum's collections.
- Archival material on the history of Castine.
