= Fairview Lanes, Ohio =

- Unincorporated community and Census-designated place
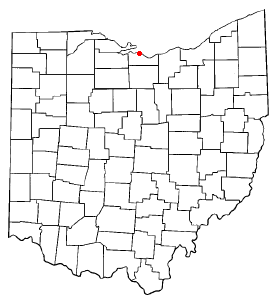
- Location of Fairview Lanes, Ohio

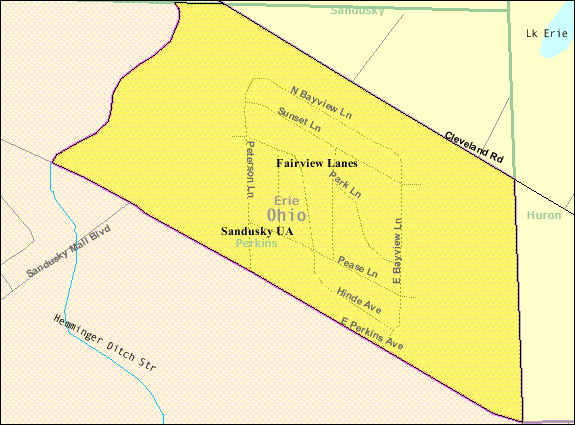
- Detailed map of Fairview Lanes
- Coordinates: 41°25′36″N 82°39′17″W
- Country: United States
- State: Ohio
- County: Erie
- Township: Perkins
- Elevation: 584 ft (178 m)

Population (2000)
  - Total: 1,015
- Time zone: UTC-5 (Eastern (EST))
  - Summer (DST): UTC-4 (EDT)
- FIPS code: 39-26432
- GNIS feature ID: 2392996

Fairview Lanes is an unincorporated community in Perkins Township, Erie County, Ohio, United States. The area was delineated as a census-designated place (CDP) for the 2000 census, at which time its population was 1,015. The area was not a CDP for the 2010 census. It is part of the Sandusky, Ohio Metropolitan Statistical Area.

== Geography ==
According to the United States Census Bureau, the CDP had a total area of 0.4 square miles (1.0 km^{2}), all of it land, within the 2000 census boundaries.

== Demographics ==
As of the census of 2000, there were 1,015 people, 394 households, and 306 families residing in the CDP. The population density was 2,779.2 inhabitants per square mile (1,073.1/km^{2}). There were 399 housing units at an average density of 1,092.5 per square mile (421.8/km^{2}). The racial makeup of the CDP was 99.01% White, 0.59% African American, 0.20% Asian, 0.10% from other races, and 0.10% from two or more races. Hispanic or Latino of any race were 1.18% of the population.

There were 394 households, out of which 34.3% had children under the age of 18 living with them, 69.0% were married couples living together, 7.4% had a female householder with no husband present, and 22.1% were non-families. 19.8% of all households were made up of individuals, and 8.9% had someone living alone who was 65 years of age or older. The average household size was 2.58 and the average family size was 2.96.

In the CDP the population was spread out, with 26.2% under the age of 18, 5.3% from 18 to 24, 25.4% from 25 to 44, 25.1% from 45 to 64, and 17.9% who were 65 years of age or older. The median age was 41 years. For every 100 females, there were 95.6 males. For every 100 females age 18 and over, there were 90.1 males.

The median income for a household in the CDP was $52,891, and the median income for a family was $57,250. Males had a median income of $39,375 versus $26,541 for females. The per capita income for the CDP was $23,864. None of the population or families were below the poverty line.
