= Sandusky South, Ohio =

- Census-designated place
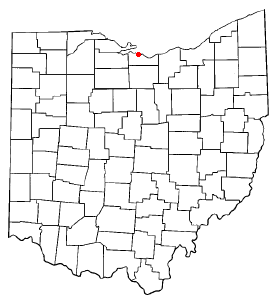
- Location of Sandusky South, Ohio

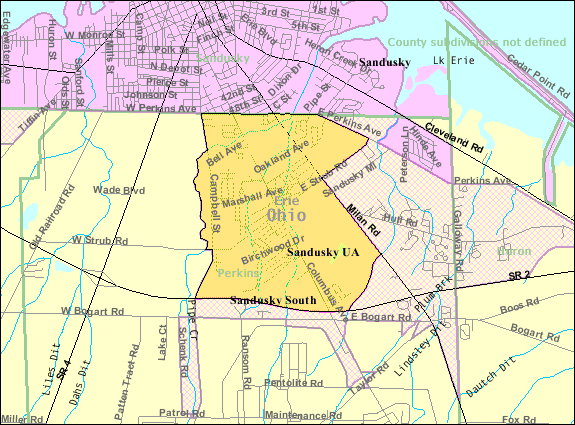
- Detailed map of Sandusky South
- Coordinates: 41°24′55″N 82°41′13″W
- Country: United States
- State: Ohio
- County: Erie
- Township: Perkins

Area
  - Total: 4.3 sq mi (11.1 km^{2})
  - Land: 4.2 sq mi (11.0 km^{2})
  - Water: 0.039 sq mi (0.1 km^{2})
- Elevation: 610 ft (190 m)

Population (2000)
  - Total: 6,599
  - Density: 1,547/sq mi (597.3/km^{2})
- Time zone: UTC-5 (Eastern (EST))
  - Summer (DST): UTC-4 (EDT)
- FIPS code: 39-70422
- GNIS feature ID: 2393223

Sandusky South is a census-designated place in Perkins Township, Erie County, Ohio, United States. The population was 6,599 at the 2000 census. It was not delineated as a CDP for the 2010 census.

== Geography ==
Sandusky South consists of developed land south of the city limits of Sandusky.

== Demographics ==
As of the census of 2000, there were 6,599 people, 2,224 households, and 1,643 families residing in the CDP. The population density was 1,546.9 inhabitants per square mile (597.3/km^{2}). There were 2,341 housing units at an average density of 548.8 per square mile (211.9/km^{2}). The racial makeup of the CDP was 88.07% White, 9.49% African American, 0.20% Native American, 0.62% Asian, 0.20% from other races, and 1.42% from two or more races. Hispanic or Latino of any race were 1.15% of the population.

There were 2,224 households, out of which 32.2% had children under the age of 18 living with them, 60.8% were married couples living together, 9.7% had a female householder with no husband present, and 26.1% were non-families. 23.5% of all households were made up of individuals, and 12.0% had someone living alone who was 65 years of age or older. The average household size was 2.56 and the average family size was 3.02.

In the CDP the population was spread out, with 22.2% under the age of 18, 5.5% from 18 to 24, 22.6% from 25 to 44, 24.4% from 45 to 64, and 25.2% who were 65 years of age or older. The median age was 45 years. For every 100 females, there were 117.1 males. For every 100 females age 18 and over, there were 123.4 males.

The median income for a household in the CDP was $51,217, and the median income for a family was $61,738. Males had a median income of $45,781 versus $25,444 for females. The per capita income for the CDP was $23,192. About 2.2% of families and 4.0% of the population were below the poverty line, including 2.7% of those under age 18 and 2.5% of those age 65 or over.
