= Perkin =

Perkin may refer to:

== People ==
- Perkin (surname)
- Perkin Warbeck (c. 1474 – 1499), imposter and pretender to the English throne

== Other uses ==
- Perkin (crater), on the Moon
- 2482 Perkin, an asteroid
- Perkin Medal, awarded annually by the American section of the Society of Chemical Industry
- Perkin, a character in The Flumps

== See also ==
- Perkins (disambiguation)
- Parkin (disambiguation)
- PerkinElmer, an American-origin global corporation
