= Richard Perkyn =

English politician

Richard Perkyn (fl. 1335) was an English politician.

He was a member (MP) of the parliament of England for Wycombe in 1335.
