= Elrosa, Minnesota =

City in Minnesota, United States

Elrosa
- City
- Location of Elrosa within Stearns County, Minnesota
- Coordinates: 45°33′46″N 94°56′50″W
- Country: United States
- State: Minnesota
- County: Stearns

Area
  - Total: 0.16 sq mi (0.41 km^{2})
  - Land: 0.16 sq mi (0.41 km^{2})
  - Water: 0 sq mi (0.00 km^{2})
- Elevation: 1,312 ft (400 m)

Population (2020)
  - Total: 213
  - Density: 1,335.0/sq mi (515.45/km^{2})
- Time zone: UTC-6 (Central (CST))
  - Summer (DST): UTC-5 (CDT)
- ZIP code: 56325
- Area code: 320
- FIPS code: 27-19088
- GNIS feature ID: 2394677

Elrosa (/ɛlˈroʊzə/ el-ROH-zə) is a city in Stearns County, Minnesota, United States. As of the 2020 census, Elrosa had a population of 213. It is part of the St. Cloud Metropolitan Statistical Area.

== Geography ==
According to the United States Census Bureau, the city has an area of 0.17 square miles (0.44 km^{2}), all land.

U.S. Highway 71 serves as a main route in the community.

== History ==
Elrosa was named after two granddaughters of one of its city council members, Ella and Rose Nichols.

== Demographics ==
Historical population
Census	Pop.	Note	%±
1940	187		—
1950	173		−7.5%
1960	205		18.5%
1970	203		−1.0%
1980	214		5.4%
1990	205		−4.2%
2000	166		−19.0%
2010	211		27.1%
2020	213		0.9%
U.S. Decennial Census

=== 2010 census ===
As of the census of 2010, there were 211 people, 85 households, and 62 families living in the city. The population density was 1,241.2 inhabitants per square mile (479.2/km^{2}). There were 91 housing units at an average density of 535.3 per square mile (206.7/km^{2}). The racial makeup of the city was 98.6% White and 1.4% from two or more races.

There were 85 households, of which 27.1% had children under the age of 18 living with them, 57.6% were married couples living together, 4.7% had a female householder with no husband present, 10.6% had a male householder with no wife present, and 27.1% were non-families. 24.7% of all households were made up of individuals, and 11.8% had someone living alone who was 65 years of age or older. The average household size was 2.42 and the average family size was 2.87.

The median age in the city was 42.5 years. 22.3% of residents were under the age of 18; 11.8% were between the ages of 18 and 24; 17.1% were from 25 to 44; 24.2% were from 45 to 64; and 24.6% were 65 years of age or older. The gender makeup of the city was 51.7% male and 48.3% female.

=== 2000 census ===
As of the census of 2000, there were 166 people, 68 households, and 43 families living in the city. The population density was 1,300.9 inhabitants per square mile (502.3/km^{2}). There were 69 housing units at an average density of 540.7 per square mile (208.8/km^{2}). The racial makeup of the city was 100.00% White. Hispanic or Latino of any race were 2.41% of the population.

There were 68 households, out of which 26.5% had children under the age of 18 living with them, 58.8% were married couples living together, 2.9% had a female householder with no husband present, and 35.3% were non-families. 30.9% of all households were made up of individuals, and 23.5% had someone living alone who was 65 years of age or older. The average household size was 2.44 and the average family size was 3.11.

In the city, the population was spread out, with 24.7% under the age of 18, 5.4% from 18 to 24, 24.1% from 25 to 44, 19.3% from 45 to 64, and 26.5% who were 65 years of age or older. The median age was 42 years. For every 100 females, there were 104.9 males. For every 100 females age 18 and over, there were 101.6 males.

The median income for a household in the city was $34,375, and the median income for a family was $42,083. Males had a median income of $22,500 versus $21,563 for females. The per capita income for the city was $17,227. None of the families and 9.4% of the population were living below the poverty line, including no under eighteens and 15.8% of those over 64.
