= USS Perkins =

Three ships in the United States Navy have been named USS Perkins for George Hamilton Perkins (1836–1899).

- The first USS Perkins (DD-26) was a modified Paulding-class destroyer launched in 1909, served in World War I and decommissioned in 1919.
- The second USS Perkins (DD-377) was a Mahan-class destroyer launched in 1935, served in World War II and sank following a collision with Australian troopship Duntroon in 1942.
- The third USS Perkins (DD-877) was a Gearing-class destroyer launched in 1944 and sold to Argentina in 1973.
