= Perkins, West Virginia =

- Unincorporated community
- Location within West Virginia Location within the United States
- Coordinates: 38°47′04″N 80°55′33″W
- Country: United States
- State: West Virginia
- County: Gilmer
- Elevation: 807 ft (246 m)
- Time zone: UTC-5 (Eastern (EST))
  - Summer (DST): UTC-4 (EDT)
- Area codes: 304 & 681
- GNIS feature ID: 1555327

Perkins is an unincorporated community in Gilmer County, West Virginia, United States. Perkins is located along County Route 52, 11.4 miles (18.3 km) south-southwest of Glenville. Perkins had a post office, which closed on November 2, 2002.

The community was named after Clen Boggs (née Perkins), the wife of an early settler.
