= Perkins Township, Erie County, Ohio =

Township in Ohio, US

- Township
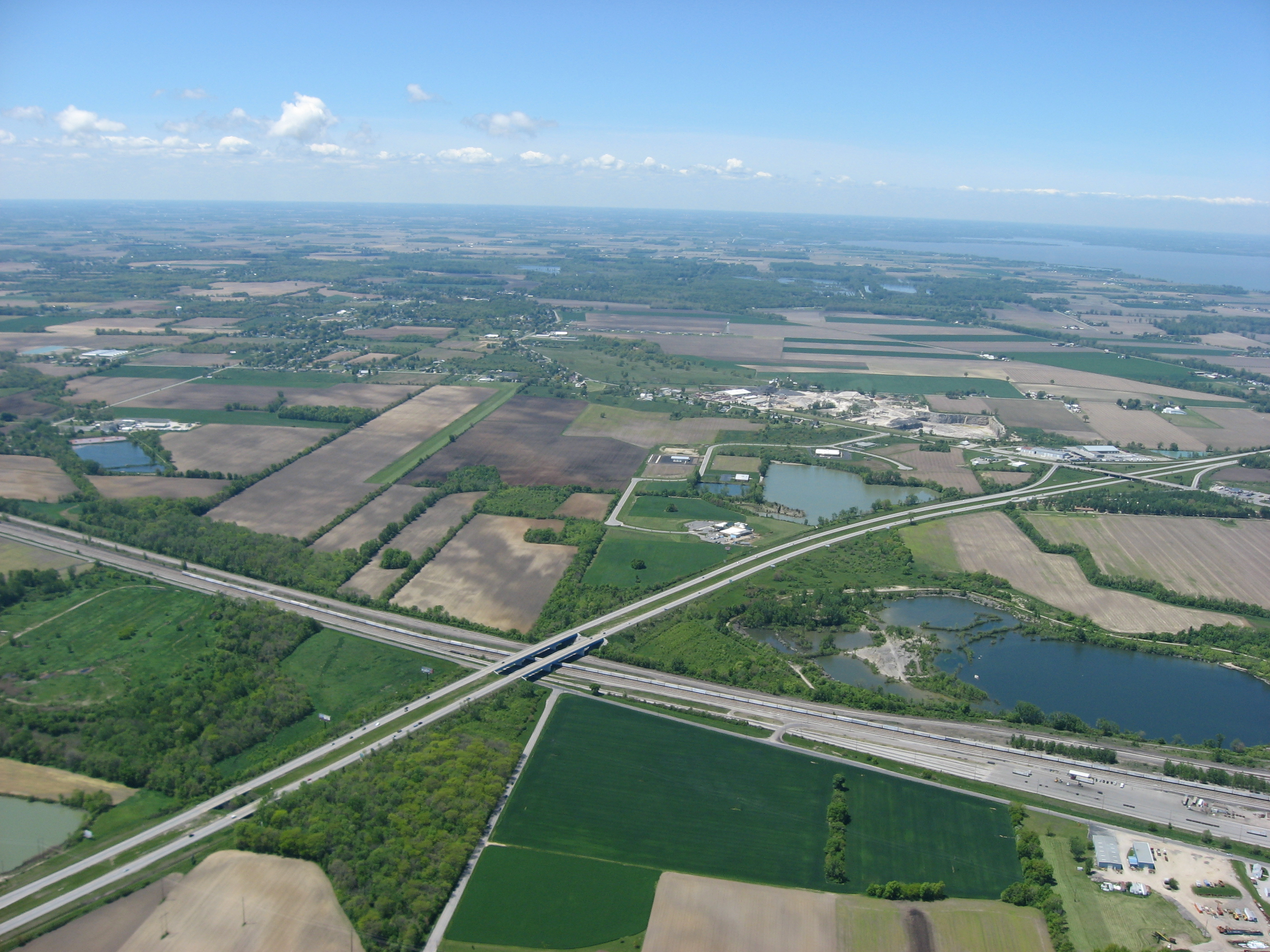
- Countryside at the western edge of Perkins Township

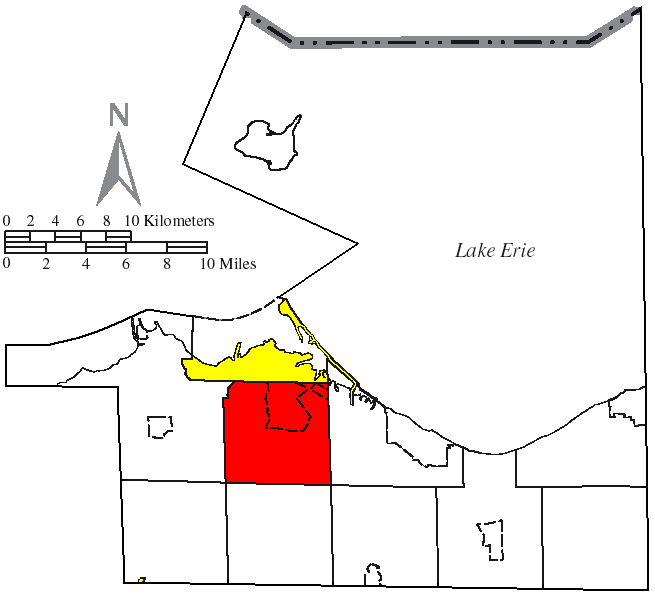
- Location of Perkins Township (red) in Erie County, adjacent to the city of Sandusky (yellow)
- Coordinates: 41°23′57″N 82°40′52″W
- Country: United States
- State: Ohio
- County: Erie

Government

Area
  - Total: 25.9 sq mi (67.2 km^{2})
  - Land: 25.8 sq mi (66.8 km^{2})
  - Water: 0.15 sq mi (0.4 km^{2})
- Elevation: 600 ft (183 m)

Population (2020)
  - Total: 12,390
  - Density: 480/sq mi (185/km^{2})
- Time zone: UTC-5 (Eastern (EST))
  - Summer (DST): UTC-4 (EDT)
- FIPS code: 39-61714
- GNIS feature ID: 1086069
- Website: www.perkinstownship.com

Perkins Township is one of the nine townships of Erie County, Ohio, United States. It is part of the Sandusky, Ohio metropolitan statistical area. As of the 2020 census the population was 12,390.

== Geography ==
Historical population
Census	Pop.	Note	%±
1880	1,878		—
1890	2,402		27.9%
1900	3,063		27.5%
1910	3,534		15.4%
1920	3,064		−13.3%
1930	3,292		7.4%
1940	3,687		12.0%
1950	4,382		18.9%
1960	8,955		104.4%
1970	10,451		16.7%
1980	10,989		5.1%
1990	10,793		−1.8%
2000	12,578		16.5%
2010	12,202		−3.0%
2020	12,390		1.5%

Located in the western part of the county, it borders the following townships and city:

- Sandusky - north
- Huron Township - east
- Milan Township - southeast corner
- Oxford Township - south
- Groton Township - southwest corner
- Margaretta Township - west

No municipalities are located in Perkins Township, although the unincorporated communities of Bogart, Fairview Lanes, and Sandusky South lie in the township's east (Bogart) and its north along the border with the city of Sandusky (other two).

== Name and history ==
Perkins Township was named for Elias Perkins, a native of Connecticut, who was one of its first landowners.

It is the only Perkins Township statewide.

== Economy ==
Perkins Township houses numerous large, commercialized and tourist-related businesses, due, in large part, to Cedar Point amusement park in neighboring Sandusky. With an increase in tourism, several prominent companies have recently built large indoor/outdoor waterpark facilities, such as Great Wolf Lodge and Maui Sands, bolstering the area's vital tourism industry. In addition, the Sandusky Mall and Sandusky Speedway lie in Perkins Township.

Aside from the Mall District, the chief employer in Perkins Township is the township's Delphi Automotive plant. On March 31, 2006, Delphi announced that the plant in Perkins Township would be one of 21 and would close in the United States following the company's filing for Chapter 11 bankruptcy in October 2005. Although the Perkins Township plant remained open, its future was uncertain, as were the livelihoods of the approximately 1,100 people employed there. However, Delphi sold the plant in early 2008 to Kyklos, Inc, which continues to operate the plant under the name KBI.

== Government ==
The township is governed by a three-member board of trustees, who are elected in November of odd-numbered years to a four-year term beginning on the following January 1. Two are elected in the year after the presidential election and one is elected in the year before it. There is also an elected township fiscal officer, who serves a four-year term beginning on April 1 of the year after the election, which is held in November of the year before the presidential election. Vacancies in the fiscal officership or on the board of trustees are filled by the remaining trustees.

== Public services ==
Addresses in the township have the Sandusky ZIP code of 44870.

Perkins Township operates full-time police and fire departments, and is the only township in Erie County with its police department. All other townships in Erie County receive law enforcement services from the Erie County Sheriff's Office.

Local education is provided by the Perkins Local School District. The District includes the Perkins High School.
