= Perkins Tide Mill =

- Formerly listed on the U.S. National Register of Historic Places
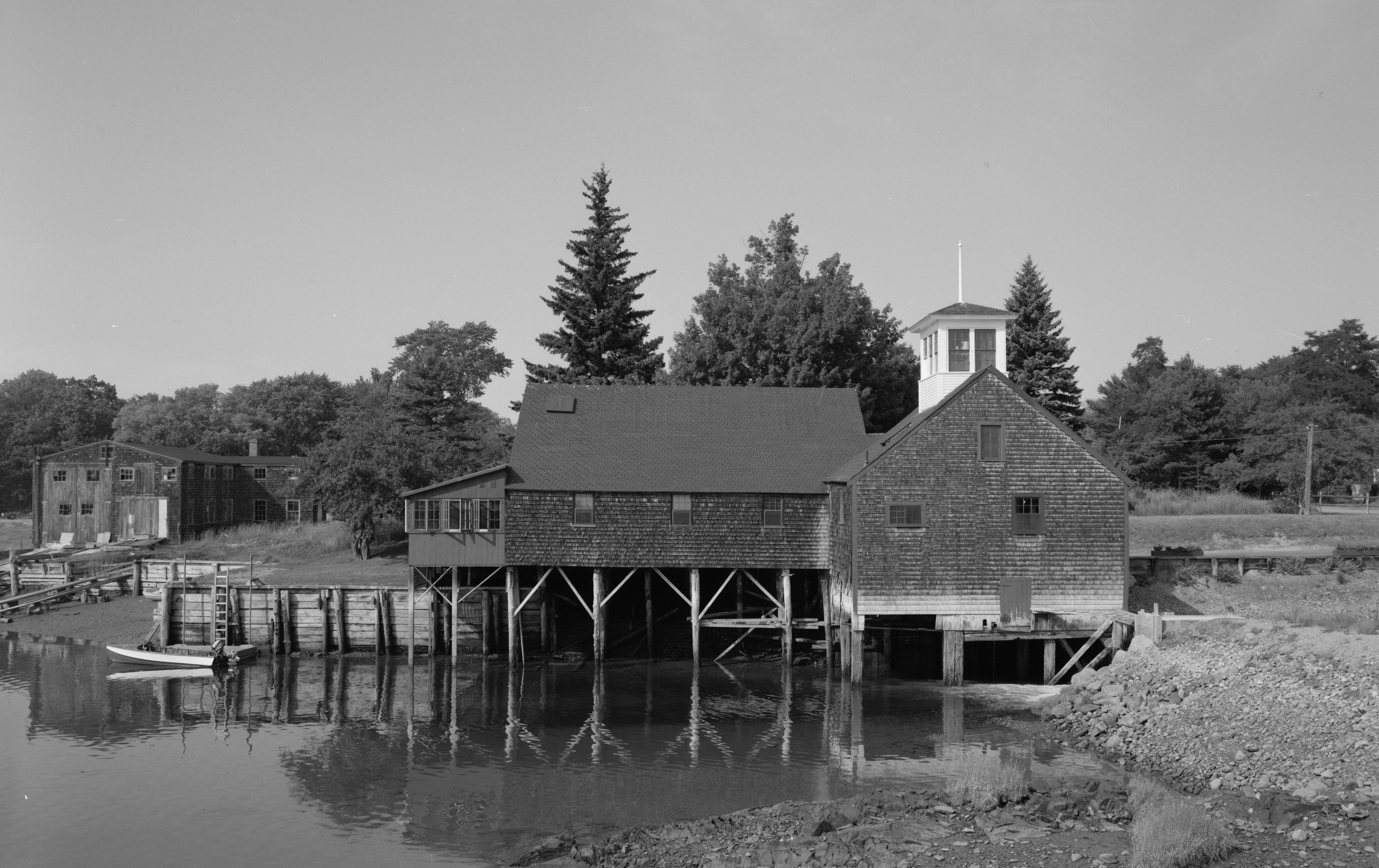

- Location within Maine Location within the United States
- Location: Mill Lane, Kennebunkport, Maine
- Coordinates: 43°22′1″N 70°28′28″W
- Area: 1 acre (0.40 ha)
- Built: 1749
- NRHP reference No.: 73000160

Significant dates
- Added to NRHP: September 7, 1973
- Removed from NRHP: March 21, 2023

The Perkins Tide Mill was one of the last surviving 18th-century tide mills in the United States. Located on Mill Lane in Kennebunkport, Maine, it was built in 1749 and operated until 1939. It was destroyed by an arsonist in 1994. Listed on the National Register of Historic Places in 1973, the property's present owners, the Kennebunkport Conservation Trust, are contemplating construction of a replica.

== Description and history ==
The Perkins Tide Mill was located on the north side of Kennebunkport village, on the northeast shore of Mill Stream, a tidal arm of the Kennebunk River. Its main building was an L-shaped wood-frame structure, set on wooden pilings and a rubblestone foundation. It had a cross-gabled roof, and was finished in wooden shingles. The mill interior housed a wide variety of equipment related to the history of its operation as a grist mill, including a waterwheel, grindstones, and gears and shafts. A dam, still partially in evidence, extended across Mill Stream, with a sluiceway near the building.

The mill was built in 1749, and was successively adapted to new technologies until 1939, when it ceased operations. Its original grindstone was imported from England, and the dam was originally granite with pine posts. A new grindstone was imported from France in 1866, and the dam was rebuilt in 1963, with most of the old structure retained under the new. The mill building was destroyed by an arsonist in 1994. In 2006 the property was acquired by the Kennebunkport Conservation Trust, a local historic preservation organization. It is presently working on plans to reconstruct the mill, using timbers from period structures and parts from antique mills.

== See also ==
- National Register of Historic Places listings in York County, Maine
