= Perkins, Minnesota =

Unincorporated community in Minnesota, United States

Perkins
- Unincorporated community
- Location within Minnesota Location within the United States
- Coordinates: 43°46′59″N 91°38′40″W
- Country: United States
- State: Minnesota
- County: Houston
- Elevation: 758 ft (231 m)
- Time zone: UTC-6 (Central (CST))
  - Summer (DST): UTC-5 (CDT)
- Area code: 507
- GNIS feature ID: 654874

Perkins is an unincorporated community in Money Creek, Houston County, Minnesota, United States.
