= Perkins High School (Ohio) =

Location
- 3714 Campbell Street; Sandusky, Ohio 44870; United States; 41°24′46″N 82°42′7″W

Information
- Type: Public
- School district: Perkins Local School District
- NCES School ID: 390468102663
- Principal: Jeff Harbal
- Teaching staff: 30.44 (FTE)
- Grades: 9–12
- Enrollment: 539 (2024–25)
- Student to teacher ratio: 17.71
- Colors: Black and white
- Athletics conference: Northern Ohio Conference
- Team name: Pirates
- Rivals: Sandusky High School; Huron High School
- Website: phs.perkinsschools.org

Perkins High School is a public high school in Perkins Township, Ohio, near Sandusky. It is the only high school in the Perkins Local School District. Athletic teams are known as the Pirates and school colors are black and white with an accent of red.

== Athletics ==
=== State championships ===
- Baseball — 2026
- Football – 1999
- Boys cross country – 1987, 1988, 1989
- Boys track and field – 1984, 2008
- Girls track and field – 1993
- Girls golf - 2012

== Notable alumni ==
- Jay Crawford - (Class of 1983) sports anchor for Sportscenter
- Brian Bixler - (Class of 2001) perennial major league baseball infielder
