= John Perkins House (Castine, Maine) =

Historic house in Maine, United States

- U.S. National Register of Historic Places
- U.S. Historic district – Contributing property
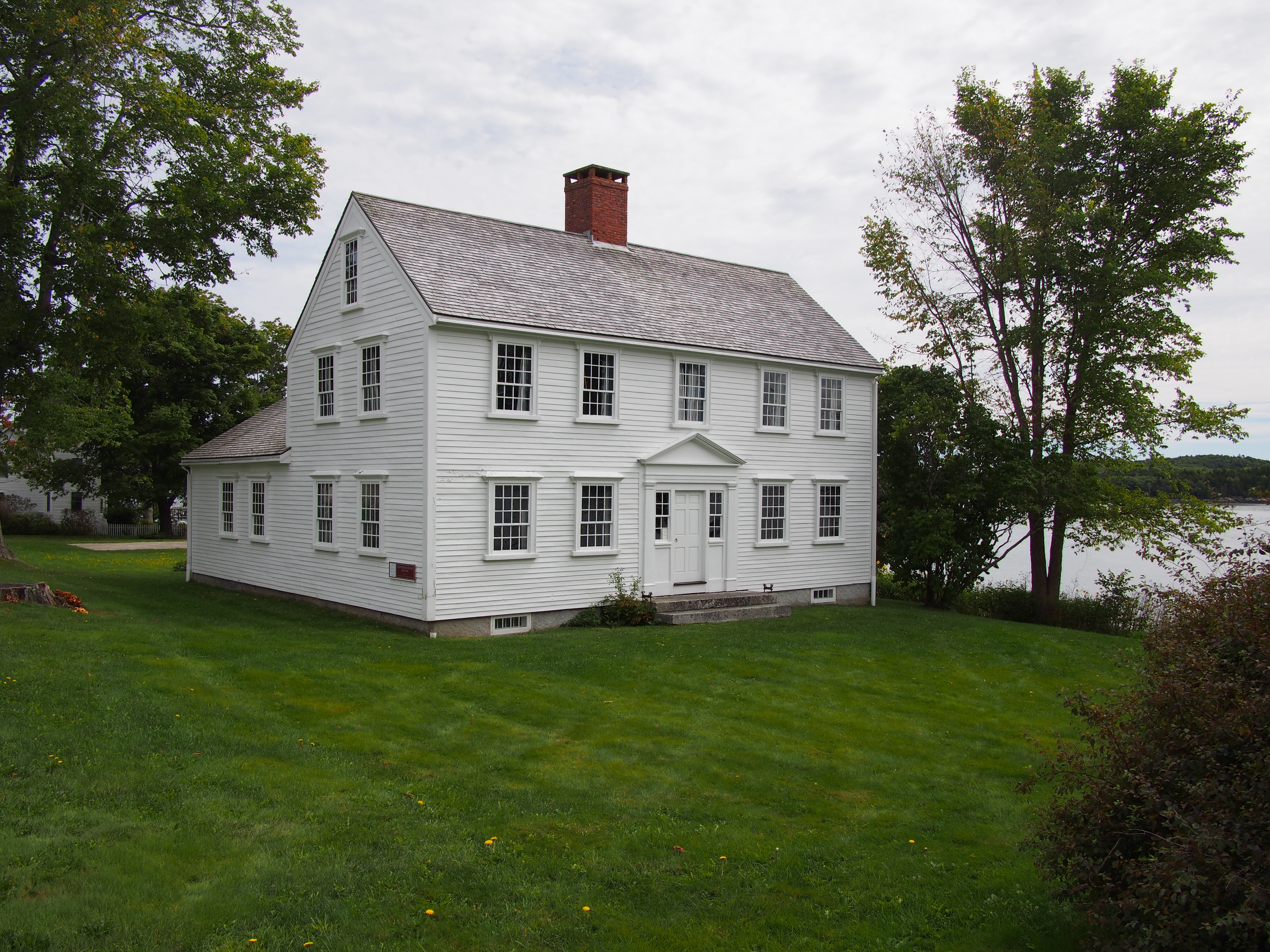

- Location within Maine Location within the United States
- Location: Perkins St., Castine, Maine
- Coordinates: 44°23′2″N 68°48′22″W
- Area: 0.3 acres (0.12 ha)
- Built: 1765
- Architectural style: Colonial
- Part of: Castine Historic District (ID73000240)
- NRHP reference No.: 69000019

Significant dates
- Added to NRHP: December 30, 1969
- Designated CP: February 23, 1973

The John Perkins House is a historic house museum on the grounds of the Wilson Museum at 120 Perkins Street in Castine, Maine. Built in 1765 on Court Street, it is one of the oldest houses in Castine, and a well-preserved example of Georgian architecture; it was moved to its present location in 1968-69 and restored. The house was listed on the National Register of Historic Places in 1969. It is open for tours on a limited basis during July and August; the Gallery located in the basement is open from May to September.

== Description and history ==
The Perkins House stands on the south side of Perkins Street, between the street and the Bagaduce River. It faces west, toward the main Wilson Museum building. It is a 2 1/2-story wood-frame structure, five bays wide, with a central chimney. A 1 1/2-story ell extends to the rear of house; it also has a gable roof and a chimney. Its timbers are hand-hewn and joined by mortise and tenons, the lath used in the walls is made of split wood. The front entry is framed by sidelight windows and pilasters, and topped by an entablature and gabled pediment.

The house has a construction history dating to 1763 when John Perkins, a native of York, Maine, moved here with his bride. The house Perkins built was located on what is now Court Street, and initially consisted of a single-story structure corresponding to the rear ell of the house. The present two-story main block was built sometime thereafter. The original ell was replaced about 1783 by a two-story structure. By the mid-20th century the building had deteriorated in condition, and had been condemned as a fire hazard. It was rescued by the Wilson Museum, carefully disassembled, and reassembled on the present site. The 1783 ell was too badly rotted to save, and was replaced by the present reconstruction of the original single-story ell. The main downstairs rooms of the house have been restored to their appearance circa 1783.

The house is the only known house in Castine to predate the American Revolutionary War. The house was occupied by British troops in 1779, and survived bombardment by American forces of the Penobscot Expedition, the disastrous attempt to dislodge the British. It was again occupied by British troops during the War of 1812.

The basement of the house was renovated in 2018 and now houses the Perkins Gallery; an extension of the Wilson Museum which contains antique farm tools and objects, items from the Perkins House, as well as a history of the surrounding towns. The Gallery is open the same days as the Museum.

== See also ==
- National Register of Historic Places listings in Hancock County, Maine
