= Clag (card game) =

Trick-taking card game

- Alternative names: Clagg, Cleg
- Type: trick-taking
- Players: 3-7
- Skills: tactics, probability
- Cards: 52
- Deck: French
- Rank (high→low): A K Q J 10 9 8 7 6 5 4 3 2
- Play: Clockwise

Related games
- Whist, Hearts

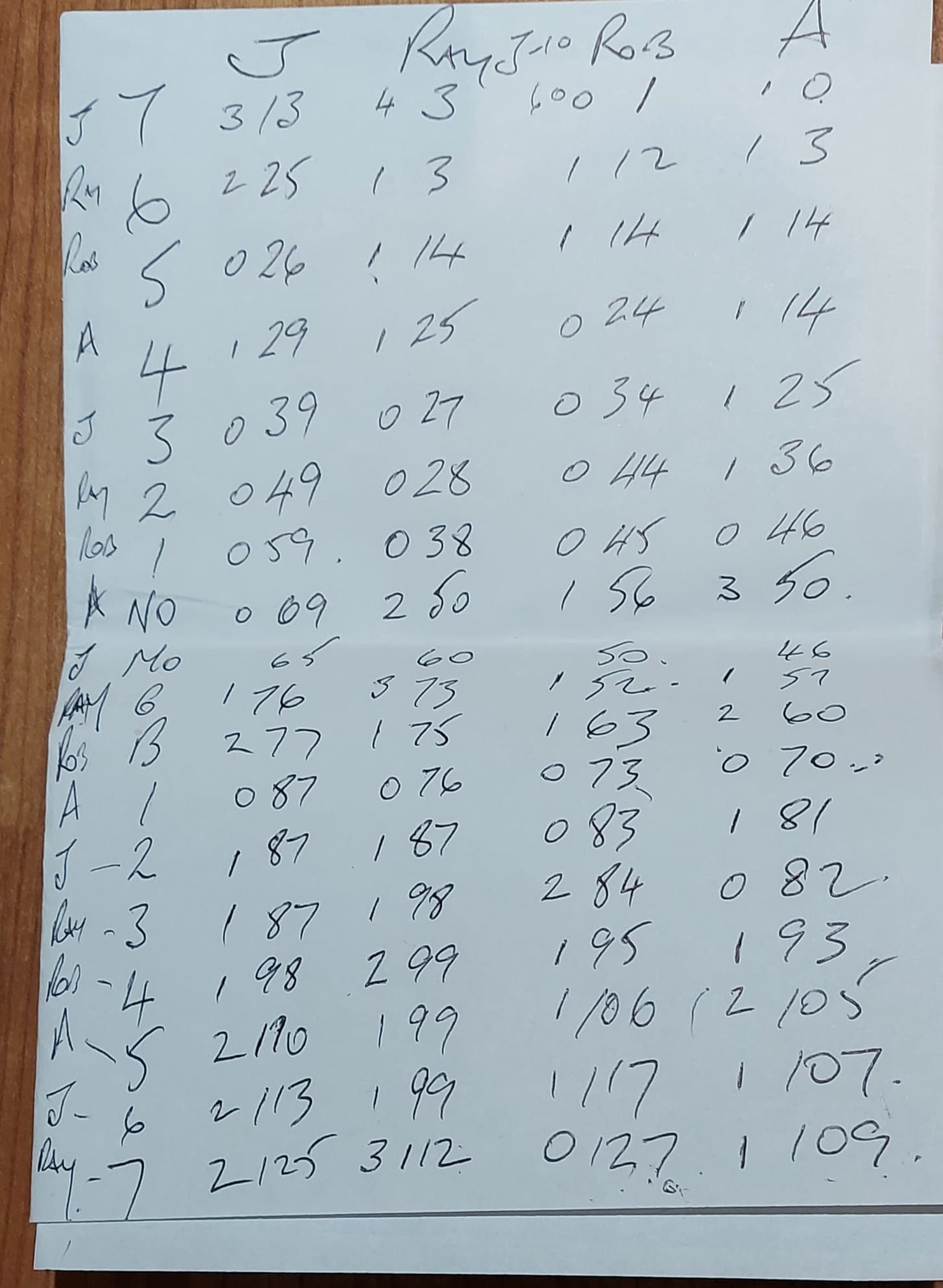
Clag Scottish rules scoresheet. Note bids in smaller text.

Clag is a trick-taking card game using a standard pack of 52 French-suited playing cards. It is similar to oh hell, and can be played by three to seven players. Clag originated in the Royal Air Force and started as an acronym for Clouds Low Aircraft Grounded.

== History and distribution ==
Clag purportedly originated in the Royal Air Force during the Second World War and started as an acronym for Clouds Low Aircraft Grounded. In this century, the game has been played locally in the US, for example, there have been courses in Jacksonville, Oregon where it is also called Deal with It!.

== Cards ==
Clag uses a 52-card, French-suited pack, the cards ranking in their natural order, Aces high.

== Overview ==
The game comprises 20 or 22 deals in 3 phases as follows:

- Phase 1: 7 deals. Players receive 1 card each in deal 1 and then one more each time until deal 7 in which they receive 7 cards.
- Phase 2: 6 or 8 deals with special rules. Players receive 7 cards each time.
- Phase 3: 7 deals. Phase 1 in reverse order.

The aim is to score the highest number of points by the end of the game.

== Rules ==
=== Deal ===
The cards are shuffled, cut by the player on the dealer's right and the requisite number dealt, one-by-one and clockwise to all the players. The top card from the remaining stock is turned over to reveal the trump suit if required.

=== Nominations ===
In clockwise order beginning with eldest hand (left of dealer), players now nominate how many tricks they will win. The dealer nominates last and must choose a number that, combined with all preceding nominations, does not equal the number of cards dealt. A correct nomination is worth 10 points and each trick is worth a further 2. For example, a player nominating two tricks and succeeding in taking exactly two, scores 14 points. A player failing to take the exact number predicted scores zero.

=== Phase 1 ===
The complete game consists of twenty or twenty-two rounds each with slightly different rules. In Phase 1, there are 7 deals. In deal 1, only one card is dealt to each player; in deal 2, two are dealt. In successive deals the number of cards dealt increases by one each time up to seven cards.

Eldest hand leads to the first trick. Players must follow suit if able; otherwise may play any card. A trick is won by the highest trump if any are played; otherwise by the highest card of the led suit. The trick winner places the trick away, face down, and leads any card to the next trick.

=== Phase 2 ===
There are six or eight deals in phase 2 in which players receive 7 cards each. However, there are special rules in each deal.

==== Six deals ====
Foss gives the six deals as:

- Deal 8. No Trumps. Seven cards are dealt and there are no trumps.
- Deal 9. Guess 'Em. The trump card is revealed only after nominations have been made.
- Deal 10. Misere No Trumps. Two points are deducted per trick taken; 10 points are awarded for taking no tricks.
- Deal 11. Misere with Trumps. Three points are deducted per trick taken. (Note: Presumably 10 points are still awarded for taking no tricks, but Foss does not state this.)
- Deal 12. Blind. Players nominate before receiving their cards
- Deal 13. Roll 'Em. Players do not look at their cards, but stack them face down and play them in order from the top.

==== Eight deals ====
McLeod gives the eight-deal scheme as follows:

- Deal 8. No Trumps. As before.
- Deal 9. Misere. With trumps. 10 points are awarded for taking no tricks.
- Deal 10. Guess Trumps. As Guess 'Em above.
- Deal 11. Blind. As before.
- Deal 12. Twos Wild. Players nominate the rank and suit of a Two as it is played. It beats the natural card it represents. It must be given the same suit as the led card if the player has another card of the led suit.
- Deal 13. Aces Low.
- Deal 14. Dealer Calls Trumps. The dealer names trumps after viewing their own cards.
- Deal 15. Highest Number. No nominations. The player taking the most tricks scores 10 points. In a tie, no-one scores.

=== Phase 3 ===
Phase 3 is Phase 1 with the order reversed. Players start with 7 cards each in deal 14/16 reducing to 1 card in deal 20/22.

== Sample score card ==
A score card like the following can be used to help record scores. Each round is recorded in a row and each player gets a column with a running total of points. The left-hand number is the score after that rows round and the right hand number is a record of the bid recorded before the round starts play. (Note: The phase 2 deals do not correspond with Foss or McLeod and must originate from another source.)

| Round | Craig | Annabel | Kathryn | Phil |
|---|---|---|---|---|
| 1 | 10 0 | 12 1 | 10 0 | 10 0 |
| 2 | 22 1 | 22 0 | 20 0 | 22 1 |
| 3 | 22 0 | 34 1 | 20 1 | 34 1 |
| 4 | 22 1 | 46 1 | 20 1 | 34 2 |
| 5 | 36 2 | 46 1 | 20 2 | 50 3 |
| 6 | 50 2 | 46 1 | 34 2 | 64 2 |
| 7 | 60 0 | 60 2 | 48 2 | 64 2 |
| nt (no trumps) | 70 1 | 60 4 | 48 1 | 64 4 |
| bt (blind trumps) | 84 2 | 72 1 | 48 3 | 64 4 |
| hb (half blind) | 84 1 | 84 1 | 48 2 | 64 2 |
| b (blind) | 84 2 | 96 1 | 48 2 | 64 1 |
| m (misere) | 76 - | 92 - | 46 - | 74 - |
| mnt (misere no trumps) | 86 - | 102 - | 44 - | 62 - |
| 7 | 86 3 | 112 0 | 44 3 | 62 2 |
| 6 | 86 0 | 128 3 | 56 1 | 62 2 |
| 5 | 98 1 | 142 2 | 68 1 | 62 3 |
| 4 | 98 1 | 154 1 | 68 2 | 62 1 |
| 3 | 108 0 | 164 0 | 68 2 | 62 1 |
| 2 | 118 0 | 174 0 | 68 2 | 62 1 |
| 1 | 128 0 | 184 0 | 80 1 | 72 0 |

== Royal Air Force rules ==
Clag was primarily played throughout the Royal Air Force until the early 1990s, the rules varied from station to station and squadron to squadron around the globe. At this time serving personnel attempted to unify the rules throughout the service. This section covers the rules in use at that time.

The game is largely played as above except the number of deals would vary depending on the time available to play. The number of cards dealt in each deal (between 3 and 7) is chosen by the dealer and there is no set structure to the rules for each deal. Instead, the player who won the previous deal, (referred to as the Caller) chooses the rules for the deal after viewing their hand.

The Caller as well as having the option of choosing Trumps or No-Trumps has the option of Precedence where the suits rank from high to low: hearts, clubs, diamonds, spades. Thus hearts is the top suit, trumping all other suits. Clubs will trump diamonds and spades. Diamonds just trump spades and spades being no trump. In Reverse Precedence the order is: spades, diamonds, clubs and hearts. Any variation of Precedence may be called, e.g. Reverse Precedence, Red over Black (d,h,s,c) Precedence, Black over Red (c,s,h,d) etc.

Regardless of trumps, players must follow the led suit if possible. For example, if the first card played to a trick is a club and a player has a losing club in their hand, they must play that card and lose the trick rather than playing a trump to win it.

Another option is Nuloss (pronounced New Loss) in which the ranking of the cards in the pack is reversed. Twos become the highest cards in the pack and Aces the lowest.

If a Blind hand is called all players must shuffle their hands and place the cards face down on the table then play the round from the top of their hand.

Other options available to the caller are to alter the scoring system. As stated in the main rules above one option is Misère where each winning hand will give a minus score. Another option though is Ascending or Descending Madness. In Ascending Madness the first trick is worth 2 points, the second 4, the third 6 etc. In Descending Madness this is reversed, the first trick having a value of twice the number of cards in the hand descending down to the last trick being worth only 2 points. When playing a round of Ascending or Descending Madness players still predict the number of tricks they will win for a bonus of 10 points, unless Ascending or Descending Madness is combined with Misere when all players as stated above must predict winning no tricks.

An important rule when players predict the number of tricks they expect to win, is that the sum of predictions can not equal the number of cards in the hand. This ensures that it is impossible for all player to receive the bonus points for the round.

Any combination of these calls can be combined to create some very complex rounds. Making the right call becomes an important part of winning at Clag and also increases the importance of winning rounds so as to be in the position of tailoring the deal specifically to a player's hand. For example, 2♥ 3♥ 4♥ 2♦ 4♦ 3♣ may seem a bad hand, but the option of calling Nuloss Precedence, Red over Black Ascending Madness could put a player in a very strong position indeed.

== Scottish Rules ==
Clag was brought back to Scotland by RAF servicemen in the late 1950s after National Service.

Games are for 3 to 7 players with 18 rounds during which players score 10 points for making a correct bid and one point for each trick taken. Bidding and taking no tricks earns 10 points, correctly taking one trick earns 11 points, two tricks 12 and so on. The dealer turns over a card for each participant to see who bids first. The cards are dealt, trumps are turned over and the first player bids, followed by the others in a clockwise direction. The combined number of bids must not add up to the number of cards in the round so the last player is quite often give a dilemma. The cards are then dealt in each round from 7 cards each down to one then four special rounds of:

- No Trumps. An ace is the highest card
- Misere. 2 points are deducted for every trick taken and 10 points gained if no tricks are taken
- Guess. Players bid before trumps are turned
- Blind. Players bid without seeing cards or trumps.

For the last 7 rounds the number of cards then increase from one to 7 when the last round is often the decider. The Scottish game is different as the skill of the players counts more towards the end of the game with more cards and the element of luck (with one card, for instance) happens in the middle of the game. The game has also spread to touring Scottish cyclists as evening entertainment.

== Bibliography ==
- Foss, Taylor. "The Rules of Clagg". Archived from the original on 2008-03-18.
