= Perkins Estate =

Historic house in Massachusetts, United States

- U.S. National Register of Historic Places
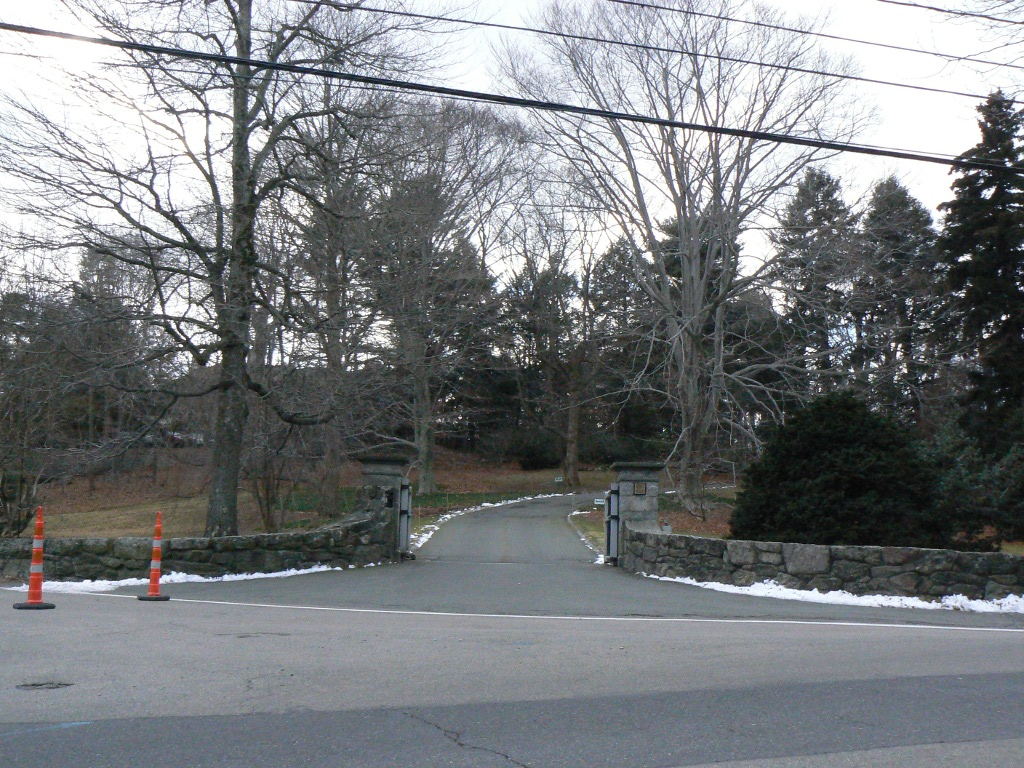

- Location within Massachusetts Location within the United States
- Location: 450 Warren St., Brookline, Massachusetts
- Coordinates: 42°19′14″N 71°8′39″W
- Area: 22 acres (8.9 ha)
- Architect: Edward Clarke Cabot
- Architectural style: Gothic Revival, Picturesque
- MPS: Brookline MRA
- NRHP reference No.: 85003306
- Added to NRHP: October 17, 1985

The Perkins Estate is a historic estate at 450 Warren Street in Brookline, Massachusetts. The property was part of the summer estate of the Cabot family, originally belonging to Thomas Handasyd Perkins; the present main mansion house was built in the 1850s to a plan by Edward Clarke Cabot for his sister-in-law, Elizabeth Perkins Cabot. The grounds of the property were originally designed by Perkins, and subsequent generations maintained the grounds to a high degree. In the 1980s it was owned by Mitch Kapor, founder of Lotus Development.

The property was listed on the National Register of Historic Places in 1985.

== See also ==
- National Register of Historic Places listings in Brookline, Massachusetts
