= Clag (glue) =

Brand of glue

- Current owner: Bostik
- Country: Australia

Clag logo

Clag is an Australian brand of glue made by Bostik. The non-toxic glue is aimed for use by children in schools.

== History ==
Clag was first trademarked in 1898 by Joseph Angus of Melbourne. The exact composition of the original paste is unknown but is thought to have been starch-based, which is the current composition of the product.

During the 1970's and 1980's Australian punk rock era, Clag glue was used by punk rockers to stiffen their hair in the style of a mohawk. It would make the mohawk "hair spikes" rock hard and took at least an hour under a shower to soften it enough to be removed.
