= John Perkins House (Wenham, Massachusetts) =

Historic house in Massachusetts, United States

- U.S. National Register of Historic Places
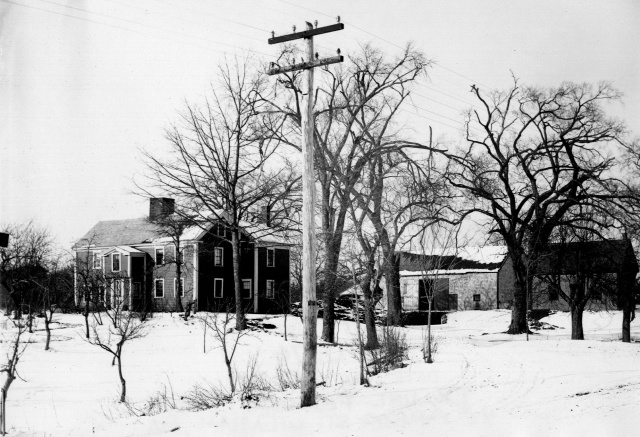
- Photo of house and barn, 1892

- Location within Massachusetts Location within the United States
- Location: 75 Arbor Street, Wenham, Massachusetts
- Coordinates: 42°36′49″N 70°53′19″W
- Built: 1710
- Architectural style: Colonial Revival, Colonial
- MPS: First Period Buildings of Eastern Massachusetts TR
- NRHP reference No.: 90000269
- Added to NRHP: March 9, 1990

The John Perkins House was a historic First Period house in Wenham, Massachusetts. The 2.5-story wood-frame house was built in stages, beginning c. 1710 with the right side and the chimney. This was followed by the left side and the rear leanto, which were probably added in the following decades. It is possible that the house was built with a single story porch, which would have been a quite rare feature.

The house was listed on the National Register of Historic Places in 1990. The home was demolished on May 13, 2011. In 2018, the property was sold and developed into a single-family dwelling.

== See also ==
- National Register of Historic Places listings in Essex County, Massachusetts
- List of the oldest buildings in Massachusetts
