= Perkins Paste =

Australian brand of adhesive

- Founded: 1934; 92 years ago in Surry Hills, Australia
- Founder: Maurice Bertram Jeffery

Perkins Paste was an Australian brand of adhesive. Although not designed specifically for children, its quick drying, non-toxic formula made it safe for school use. The glue was sold commonly in small, 60-gram, fuchsia-coloured, cylindrical plastic tubs with white plastic lids that incorporated the flat, spatula-like applicator. The paste was a thick white solid paste, made from boiled potato dextrin.

== Company history ==
Perkins Paste was owned and started by Maurice Bertram Jeffery, a commercial artist who found himself unemployed during the Great Depression. Production began in 1934 in Albion Street, Surry Hills and ceased during the 1980s. It became a cultural icon, akin to Vegemite or the Tim Tam biscuit. Many users of the product recall eating Perkins Paste during their primary school years.

== Popular culture ==
A track called 'Perkins Paste' has been recorded by the band Bleeding Jelly Eyes.

On 11 March 1993, Perkins Paste was mentioned in the NSW Legislative Assembly during debate on the 'State Environmental Planning Policy No. 3 - Castlereagh Liquid Waste Disposal Depot'. The then Member for Ermington implied that the then Member for Blacktown had rearranged information contained in Water Board memoranda: "out with the scissors, out with the Perkins Paste, and out with the truth".

In 2003, Perkin's Paste was mentioned in a newspaper report concerning the youth creative arts festival 'Noise' in Melbourne. The digital revolution was likened to Perkins Paste as a form of creativity (of DIY, cutting and pasting) available to everyone.

Travel writer Susan Kurosawa recalled, in a 2007 newspaper article, her mother's use of Perkins Paste:

I have a photograph of the young Susan, on board the old Arcadia in the late 1950s, en route from Southampton to Sydney, at an equator-crossing ceremony. I appear to be wearing a hula skirt and a discouragingly small bra made from two segments of a cut-up egg carton. Around my neck is a chain of coloured bath cubes. My hair is a mermaid's tangle of toilet-roll twists and I am holding an upside-down broom as a makeshift trident. I have a vague memory of the terror I felt when my mother set off to make this costume at an on-board creative arts class. What that woman couldn't do with a few rolls of crepe paper, a couple of decommissioned coat-hangers and a pot of Perkins Paste isn't even worth considering.

A t-shirt showing the Perkins Paste label was previously available from REMO.

Australian Urban Culture side-note: Eating small amounts of Perkin's Paste was a "rite of passage" in most Australian Primary Schools during the 1970s.
