= Perkins =

Perkins is a surname derived from the Anglo-Saxon corruption of the kin of Pierre (from Pierre kin to Pierrekin to Perkins), introduced into England by the Norman Conquest. It is found throughout mid- and southern England.

Another derivation comes from the Welsh Perthyn, relative or belonging to a particular person or family, and also thought to be the Anglicized form of Peredur, from medieval Welsh.

== People ==
=== A to D ===
- A. E. Perkins (June 21, 1879 – April 19, 1946), American principal and author
- Al Perkins, American guitarist
- Angel Perkins (born 1984), American sprinter
- Annie Stevens Perkins (1868–1911), American writer
- Anthony Perkins (1932–1992), American actor
- Archie Perkins (b 2002), Australian football league player
- Arthur James Perkins (1871–1944), viticulturist and educationist in South Australia
- Austin Perkins (born 1999), American powerlifter
- Benjamin Douglas Perkins (1774–1810), American propagandist of "Perkins tractors" therapy
- Bill Perkins (disambiguation), several people
- Bishop Perkins (1787–1866), Congressman from New York
- Bishop W. Perkins (1841–1894), U.S. Representative and Senator from Kansas
- Blake Perkins (born 1996), American baseball player
- Brian Perkins, New Zealander anchor and newsreader on BBC Radio 4
- Bryce Perkins (born 1996), American football player
- Broderick Perkins (born 1954), American baseball player
- Carl Perkins (1932–1998), American singer-songwriter
- Carl Christopher Perkins, politician, Kentucky Representative
- Carl Dewey Perkins (1912–1984), politician, Kentucky Representative
- Charles A. Perkins, American lawyer
- Charles Callahan Perkins (1823–1886), American art critic and author
- Charles L. Perkins, technology author
- Charles N. Perkins, Australian football and political figure
- Charles S. Perkins, American baseball player
- Charlotte Perkins Gilman (1860–1935), American sociologist, writer and feminist
- Cheryle Perkins, American politician
- Cyril Perkins (1911–2013), English cricketer and centenarian
- Daniel Perkins, of the Perkins Reluctant Phoenix British human-powered aircraft
- Darius Perkins (1964–2019), Australian actor
- Daryl Perkins, Australian track cyclist
- Don Perkins, National Football League running back for the Dallas Cowboys
- Doron Perkins, American basketball player of Israeli Basketball Premier League

=== E to K ===
- Edward J. Perkins, U.S. Ambassador to the United Nations
- Edwin Perkins (disambiguation), several people
- Elisha Perkins (1741–1799), American physician
- Elizabeth Perkins, American actress
- Emily Perkins, Canadian actress
- Emily Perkins (novelist), New Zealand author
- Emily Pitkin Perkins, wife of Connecticut Governor and US Senator Roger Sherman Baldwin
- Evora Bucknum Perkins (1851–1929), American educator, cookbook writer, and missionary
- Flo Perkins, American glass artist
- Frances Perkins (1880–1965), American workers-rights advocate and U.S. Secretary of Labor
- Frank Perkins (disambiguation), several people
- Frederic Beecher Perkins (1828–1899), American editor, librarian and writer
- Gastón Perkins (1928–2006), Argentine racing driver
- Geoffrey Perkins (1953–2008), British comedy producer, writer, and performer
- George Perkins (disambiguation), several people
- Gil Perkins, Australian film and television actor
- Harold Perkins (born 2004), American football player
- Henry Coit Perkins (1804–1873), American physician and amateur photographer
- Henry Perkins (cricketer) (1832–1916), English cricketer and cricket administrator
- Henry Farnham Perkins (1877–1956), American zoologist and eugenicist
- Hugh V. Perkins (1918–1988), American human development and education researcher
- Ian Perkins, American musician/guitarist of the band The Horrible Crowes
- Isabel Weld Perkins (1876–1948), American socialite and philanthropist
- J. Will Perkins (died 1926), American politician from Maryland
- Jack Perkins (disambiguation), several people
- Jacob Perkins (1766–1849), American engineer and inventor
- Jacqueline Perkins (runner) (born 1965), Australian long-distance runner
- Jacqueline Perkins (diplomat), British diplomat and ambassador
- James Perkins (disambiguation), several people
- Janet Russell Perkins (1853–1933), American botanist
- Jason Perkins (born 1992), Filipino-Canadian basketball player
- John Perkins (disambiguation), several people
- Jordan Courtney-Perkins, Australian footballer
- Josephine Amelia Perkins (born c. 1818), British horse thief and prisoner
- Josh Perkins (born 1995), American basketball player in the Israeli Basketball Premier League
- Julia Shepard Perkins (1799–1884), American writer and educator.
- Katherine K. Perkins, American physics educator
- Kathleen Rose Perkins (born 1974), American actress
- Kendrick Perkins (born 1984), American basketball player
- Kieren Perkins, Australian Olympic gold medal swimmer

=== L to R ===
- Larry Perkins, Australian Formula One race car driver
- Laurence Perkins, British classical bassoonist
- Loftus Perkins, (1834–1891), English engineer
- Luther Perkins, (1928–1968), American guitarist, backing guitarist for Johnny Cash
- Marlin Perkins, American ecologist and naturalist
- Maude B. Perkins (1874-1932), American educator and temperance reformer
- Maxwell Perkins, American editor for F. Scott Fitzgerald, Ernest Hemingway, Thomas Wolfe
- Michael J. Perkins, American Medal of Honor recipient
- Millie Perkins, American film and television actor
- Natalia Perkins, Russian and American physicist
- Niles Perkins (1919–1971), American athlete and physician
- Osgood Perkins (1892–1937), American actor
- Oz Perkins (born 1974), American screenwriter, director
- Paul Perkins (born 1994), American football player
- Pinetop Perkins (1913–2011), American blues pianist
- Polly Perkins (born 1943), British actress, singer and writer
- Ray Perkins (1941–2020), American football coach and former player
- Reginald Perkins (1955–2009), American serial killer
- Robbie Perkins (born 1994), Australian professional baseball player
- Robert Cyril Layton Perkins (1866–1955), British entomologist
- Rodney Perkins (born 1936), physician and entrepreneur
- Ronnie Perkins (born 1999), American football player

=== S to Z ===
- Sam Perkins (born 1961), National Basketball Association player
- Samuel E. Perkins (1811–1879), Justice of the Indiana Supreme Court
- Sarah Maria Clinton Perkins (1824–1905), American social reformer, newspaper editor
- Scott Perkins (born 1980), American composer
- Shane Perkins, Australian track cyclist
- Stephanie Perkins, American author
- Stephen Perkins, American musician, drummer, and songwriter with Jane's Addiction
- Sue Perkins, British television presenter, actress, comedian and writer
- Tegwen Perkins (born 1955), Welsh golfer
- Tex Perkins, Australian singer-songwriter
- Thomas Perkins (cricketer) (1870–1946), English cricketer, footballer and schoolmaster
- Thomas Clap Perkins (1798–1870), American lawyer and politician
- Thomas Nelson Perkins (1870–1937), American lawyer from Massachusetts
- Thomas Handasyd Perkins (1764–1854), American businessman and philanthropist
- Tom Perkins, American businessman of Kleiner Perkins
- Toby Perkins UK Labour Party MP and politician
- Tony Perkins (politician), American pastor, politician and activist
- Tony Perkins (news anchor), American broadcast journalist, radio personality
- Tracy Perkins, court-martialed US Army sergeant
- Troy Perkins, American soccer player for the Portland Timbers
- Victoria Perkins (born 2004), Welsh boxer
- Warren Perkins (1922–2014), American professional basketball player
- Wayne Perkins, lead session guitarist for The Rolling Stones, Bob Marley, Everly Brothers
- William Perkins (disambiguation), several people

== Fictional characters ==
- Ann Perkins, in the American sitcom Parks and Recreation
- Emma Perkins, protagonist in the musical The Guy Who Didn't Like Musicals
- Harry Perkins, principal character in the novel and TV adaptation A Very British Coup
- Joe Perkins (Santa Barbara), on the American soap opera Santa Barbara
- Ma Perkins, star of the radio soap opera from 1933 to 1960
- Perch Perkins, a news anchorman in the TV series SpongeBob SquarePants
- Polly Perkins (comics character), protagonist of the American comic strip Polly and Her Pals
- Polly Perkins, a servant maid in the 1864 musical-hall song "Pretty Polly Perkins of Paddington Green"
- Quinn Perkins, on the television series Scandal
- Rosie Perkins, protagonist in the 2023 film Hemet, or the Landlady Don't Drink Tea
- Perkins, a character in the Harry Potter books
- Mr. Perkins, live-action host of Thomas & Friends
- Ms. Perkins, one of the lesser antagonists in the movie "John Wick"

== See also ==
- Perkin (disambiguation)
- Perkin (surname)
- Parkin (surname)
- Parkins
