= Parkin (surname) =

Parkin is a surname. Notable people with the name include:

- A.M. Parkin (1943–2012), English artist
- Arthur Parkin (1952–2023), Field hockey player
- Barry Parkin (born 1964), Olympic sailor from Great Britain
- Ben Parkin (1906–1969), British politician
- Bonnie D. Parkin (1940–2025), American religious leader
- Brian Parkin (born 1965), English footballer
- Cec Parkin (1886–1943), English cricketer
- Charles Parkin (1689–1765), English clergyman and antiquarian
- Chris Parkin (born 1948), New Zealand businessman
- Dante Parkin (1873–1936), South African cricketer
- Dave Parkin (born 1956), American football player
- David Parkin (born 1942), Australian rules footballer
- Darren Parkin (born 1972), British actor and adventurer
- Derek Parkin (born 1948), English footballer
- Dmitry Parkin (born 1982), Russian 3D-artist and game developer
- Edmund T. Parkin (1912–1994), Canadian architect
- Eric Parkin (1924–2020), English pianist
- Ernest Parkin (1894–1957), English rugby league footballer
- Frank Parkin (1931–2011), British sociologist and writer
- Gareth Parkin (born 1982), English cricketer
- George Parkin (cricketer) (1864–1933), Australian cricketer
- George Parkin (footballer) (1903–1971), English footballer
- George Robert Parkin (1846–1922), Canadian educator
- Gerard Parkin (born 1959), American chemist
- Gladys Kathleen Parkin (1901–1990), American
- Harry Parkin (1879–1937), Australian rules footballer
- Herbert Parkin (1908–1998), British trade unionist and politician
- Ian Parkin (1949–1995), English musician
- Inglewood Parkin (1875–1948), English cricketer
- Isobel Parkin, Canadian research scientist
- Jack Parkin (1877–1951), Australian rules footballer
- Joe Parkin (born 1967), American cyclist
- John Parkin (cricketer) (born 1944), English cricketer
- John Parkin (Wisconsin politician) (1918–2003), American businessman and politician
- John B. Parkin (1911–1975), Canadian architect
- John C. Parkin (1922–1988), Canadian architect
- Jon Parkin (born 1981), English footballer
- Jonty Parkin (1894–1972), UK and England international rugby league footballer
- Kenneth Parkin (1921–1973), New Zealand cricketer
- Kevin L.G. Parkin (born 1977), American British scientist
- Lance Parkin (born 1971), British author
- Leonard Parkin (1929–1993), British journalist
- Lianne Parkin, New Zealand public health professor
- Lorne Parkin (1922–1992), Canadian football player
- Maurice Parkin (born 2000), English snooker player
- Mick Parkin (born 1995), English mixed martial artist
- Molly Parkin (1932–2026), Welsh painter, novelist and journalist
- Owen Parkin (born 1972), English cricketer
- Philip Parkin (born 1961), Welsh professional golfer
- Ray Parkin (1910–2005), Australian writer
- Ray Parkin (footballer) (1911–1971), English footballer
- Reginald Parkin (1909–1994), English cricketer
- Roy Parkin (1904–1957), Australian rules footballer
- Sam Parkin (born 1981), English footballer
- Sara Parkin (born 1946), British politician
- Scott Parkin (born 1969), American activist
- Simon Parkin, English journalist and writer
- Sophie Parkin (born 1961), British writer and artist
- Steve Parkin (born 1965), English footballer and manager
- Steve Parkin (musician), Australian musician and singer-songwriter
- Stuart Parkin (born 1955), British physicist
- Terence Parkin (born 1980), South African swimmer
- Thomas Parkin (1870–1936), Australian politician
- Tim Parkin (born 1957), English footballer
- Tommy Parkin (born 1956), English footballer
- Tommy Parkin (footballer, born 1902) (1902–1984), English footballer
- William Parkin (1801–1889), Australian politician

== See also ==
- Parkin (disambiguation)
- Parkins
- Perkin (surname)
- Perkins
