= Charles Perkins =

Charles Perkins may refer to:

- Charles Perkins (Aboriginal activist) (1936–2000), Australian soccer player and Indigenous rights activist
- Charles Perkins (cricketer) (1854–1912), English cricketer
- Charles Perkins (Australian politician) (1906–1961), Australian politician
- Charles Perkins (Maine politician) (1840–1907), American state legislator
- Charles A. Perkins (1869–1930), American lawyer
- Charles Callahan Perkins (1823–1886), American critic and author
- Charles Elliott Perkins (1840–1907), American railroad executive
- Charles H. Perkins, founder of Jackson & Perkins Company
- Charles L. Perkins, computer research scientist and author
- Charles William Perkins (1855–1927), English organist
- Charlie Perkins (baseball) (1905–1988), American baseball player

== See lso ==
- Chuck Perkins (born 1965), American spoken word poet and activist
