= Adelphi, Maryland =

- Census-designated place
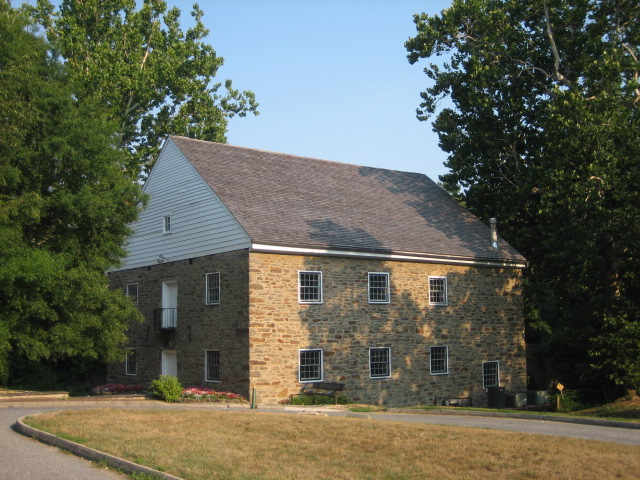
- The Adelphi Mill in July 2007

- Location of Adelphi, Maryland
- Coordinates: 38°59′49″N 76°58′0″W
- Country: United States
- State: Maryland
- County: Prince George's

Area
  - Total: 2.72 sq mi (7.04 km^{2})
  - Land: 2.71 sq mi (7.03 km^{2})
  - Water: 0.0039 sq mi (0.01 km^{2})
- Elevation: 171 ft (52 m)

Population (2020)
  - Total: 16,823
  - Density: 6,194.5/sq mi (2,391.72/km^{2})
- Time zone: UTC−5 (Eastern (EST))
  - Summer (DST): UTC−4 (EDT)
- ZIP Codes: 20783, 20787
- Area codes: 301, 240
- FIPS code: 24-00400
- GNIS feature ID: 0596997

Adelphi is an unincorporated area and census-designated place in Prince George's County, Maryland, United States. Per the 2020 Census, the population was 16,823. Adelphi includes the following subdivisions; Adelphi, Adelphi Park, Adelphi Hills, Adelphi Terrace, Adelphi Village, Buck Lodge, Chatham, Cool Spring Terrace, Hillandale Forest, Holly Hill Manor, Knollwood, Lewisdale, and White Oak Manor.

== History ==
The unincorporated Adelphi community takes its name from the historic Adelphi Mill, established in 1796 along the Northwest Branch of the Anacostia River. It continues to attract visitors and can be rented for special functions. During the 19th century, George Washington Riggs acquired much of the area northeast of Washington, D.C., as his Green Hill estate in the Chillum Manor district. That estate included present-day Adelphi. In the early 1920s, part of the area was acquired by Leander McCormick-Goodhart as part of his Langley Park estate. Labor organizer Mary Harris "Mother" Jones died in 1930, at the farm of Walter and Lillie May Burgess near Powder Mill and Riggs Roads in present-day Adelphi. A marker was erected by the Maryland State Highway Administration commemorating Mother Jones at her death site. Unlike its nearby neighbors Hyattsville and College Park, the area remained relatively undeveloped until immediately following World War II. At that time, subdivisions quickly developed.

To distinguish it from the other neighboring unincorporated communities of Lewisdale and Langley Park, the growing subdivisions banded together in the mid-1950s and adopted the name "Adelphi" to reflect their commitment to the preservation of the historic mill of the same name. A community focal point that originally developed in the late 1950s is the Adelphi Pool, a private pool in the Adelphi neighborhood, located next to George Washington Cemetery on Riggs Road.

Use of the Adelphi Pool requires paid membership or being accompanied by a member and paying a small fee. The Adelphi pool offers swimming lessons and also features swim teams which compete against each other. Two notable features of the Adelphi Pool are its long water slide and basketball hoop.

In 1971, the Harry Diamond Laboratories was established on 137 acres (0.55 km^{2}) in the northern part of Adelphi. That facility continues as the Adelphi Laboratory Center, Army Research Laboratory (ARL), the U.S. Army's corporate research laboratory. Other adjacent federal facilities include the National Archives at College Park and headquarters of the Food and Drug Administration.

=== Historic sites ===
The following is a list of historic sites in Adelphi identified by the Maryland-National Capital Park and Planning Commission:

	Site name	Image	Location	M-NCPPC Inventory Number	Comment
1	Adelphi Mill and Storehouse		8401 and 8402 Riggs Road	65-006	
2	Cool Spring Farm (Miller’s House)		2201 Cool Spring Road	65-005	
3	Gallant House		3124 Powder Mill Road	61-013	

== Geography ==
Adelphi is located at 38°59′49″N 76°58′0″W (38.996860, −76.966755).

According to the United States Census Bureau, the Census Designated Place (CDP) has a total area of 2.7 square miles (7.1 km^{2}), all land.

=== Adjacent areas ===
- Hillandale (northwest)
- Beltsville (north)
- Calverton (north)
- College Park (southeast)
- Hyattsville (south)
- Lewisdale (southwest)
- Langley Park (southwest)
- Silver Spring (west)

== Demographics ==
Historical population
Census	Pop.	Note	%±
2000	14,998		—
2010	15,086		0.6%
2020	16,823		11.5%
U.S. Decennial Census; 2010 2020

=== Racial and ethnic composition ===
Adelphi CDP, Maryland – Racial and ethnic composition Note: the US Census treats Hispanic/Latino as an ethnic category. This table excludes Latinos from the racial categories and assigns them to a separate category. Hispanics/Latinos may be of any race.
Race / Ethnicity (NH = Non-Hispanic)	Pop 2000	Pop 2010	Pop 2020	% 2000	% 2010	% 2020
White alone (NH)	3,229	1,980	1,571	38.75%	13.12%	9.34%
Black or African American alone (NH)	5,812	5,291	4,953	38.75%	35.07%	29.44%
Native American or Alaska Native alone (NH)	28	37	36	0.19%	0.25%	0.21%
Asian alone (NH)	1,481	1,168	1,367	9.87%	7.74%	8.13%
Native Hawaiian or Pacific Islander alone (NH)	9	5	6	0.19%	0.03%	0.04%
Other race alone (NH)	80	53	91	0.53%	0.35%	0.54%
Mixed race or Multiracial (NH)	499	207	336	3.33%	1.37%	2.00%
Hispanic or Latino (any race)	3,860	6,345	8,463	25.74%	42.06%	50.31%
Total	14,998	15,086	16,823	100.00%	100.00%	100.00%

=== 2020 census ===
As of the 2020 census, Adelphi had a population of 16,823. The median age was 32.9 years. 23.3% of residents were under the age of 18 and 11.2% of residents were 65 years of age or older. For every 100 females there were 107.2 males, and for every 100 females age 18 and over there were 106.8 males age 18 and over.

100.0% of residents lived in urban areas, while 0.0% lived in rural areas.

There were 5,266 households in Adelphi, of which 37.7% had children under the age of 18 living in them. Of all households, 39.0% were married-couple households, 24.1% were households with a male householder and no spouse or partner present, and 29.4% were households with a female householder and no spouse or partner present. About 24.1% of all households were made up of individuals and 6.7% had someone living alone who was 65 years of age or older.

There were 5,598 housing units, of which 5.9% were vacant. The homeowner vacancy rate was 0.8% and the rental vacancy rate was 7.4%.

=== 2000 census ===
As of 2000, there were 14,998 people, 5,332 households, and 3,321 families that were reported to be living in Adelphi, Maryland. The population density was 5,067.9 inhabitants per square mile (1,956.7/km^{2}). There were 5,627 housing units at an average density of 1,901.4 per square mile (734.1/km^{2}). The racial makeup of the CDP was quite diverse, including 29.48% White, 39.83% African American, 0.28% Native American, 9.95% Asian, 0.06% Pacific Islander, 15.04% from other races, and 5.36% from two or more races. Hispanic or Latino of any race were 25.74% of the population.

There were 5,332 households, out of which 30.6% had children under the age of 18 living with them, 42.5% were married couples living together, 13.5% had a female householder with no husband present, and 37.7% were non-families. 27.5% of all households were made up of individuals, and 6.1% had someone living alone who was 65 years of age or older. The average household size was 2.77 and the average family size was 3.35.

In the CDP, the age distribution of the population included 22.7% under the age of 18, 13.0% from 18 to 24, 35.7% from 25 to 44, 19.1% from 45 to 64, and 9.5% who were 65 years of age or older. The median age was 32 years. For every 100 females, there were 98.1 males. For every 100 females age 18 and over, there were 96.6 males.

The median income for a household in the CDP was $45,827, and the median income for a family was $53,839. Males had a median income of $32,495 versus $31,932 for females. The per capita income for the CDP was $20,952. About 6.6% of families and 9.0% of the population were below the poverty line, including 6.2% of those under age 18 and 7.4% of those age 65 or over.

== Government and infrastructure ==
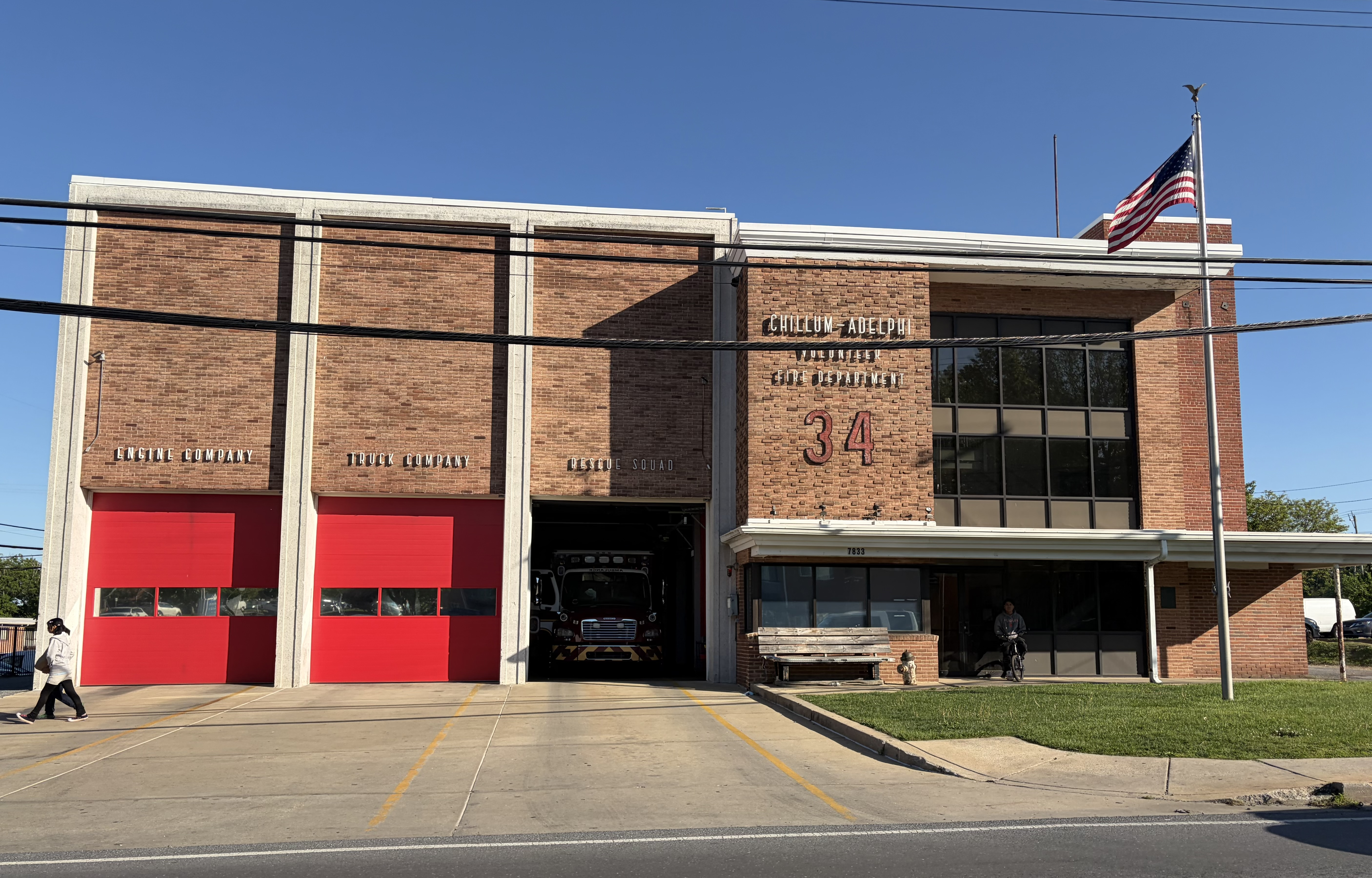
The Chillum-Adelphi Volunteer Fire Department on Riggs Road

The Prince George's County Police Department serves Adelphi through District 1, with its station in Hyattsville.

The Chillum-Adelphi Volunteer Fire Department (CAVFD) serves Adelphi. The station is in Langley Park CDP and has an Adelphi postal address. In March 1951 and June 8, 1951, the CAVFD was established and chartered, respectively. From November and March 1953 the fire station on Riggs Road was constructed; the County Volunteer Firemen's Association designated it Station No. 34. Portions of Station No. 34 were rebuilt in the early 1960s, and it was rededicated on November 16, 1963. In 1962 the CAVFD began building a substation, No. 44, which was dedicated on November 16, 1963, but in 1992 it sold the substation to the county government.

The University System of Maryland has an office in College Park, which has an Adelphi postal address and is called the "Adelphi Office". Formerly it was the headquarters of the entire system.

== Education ==
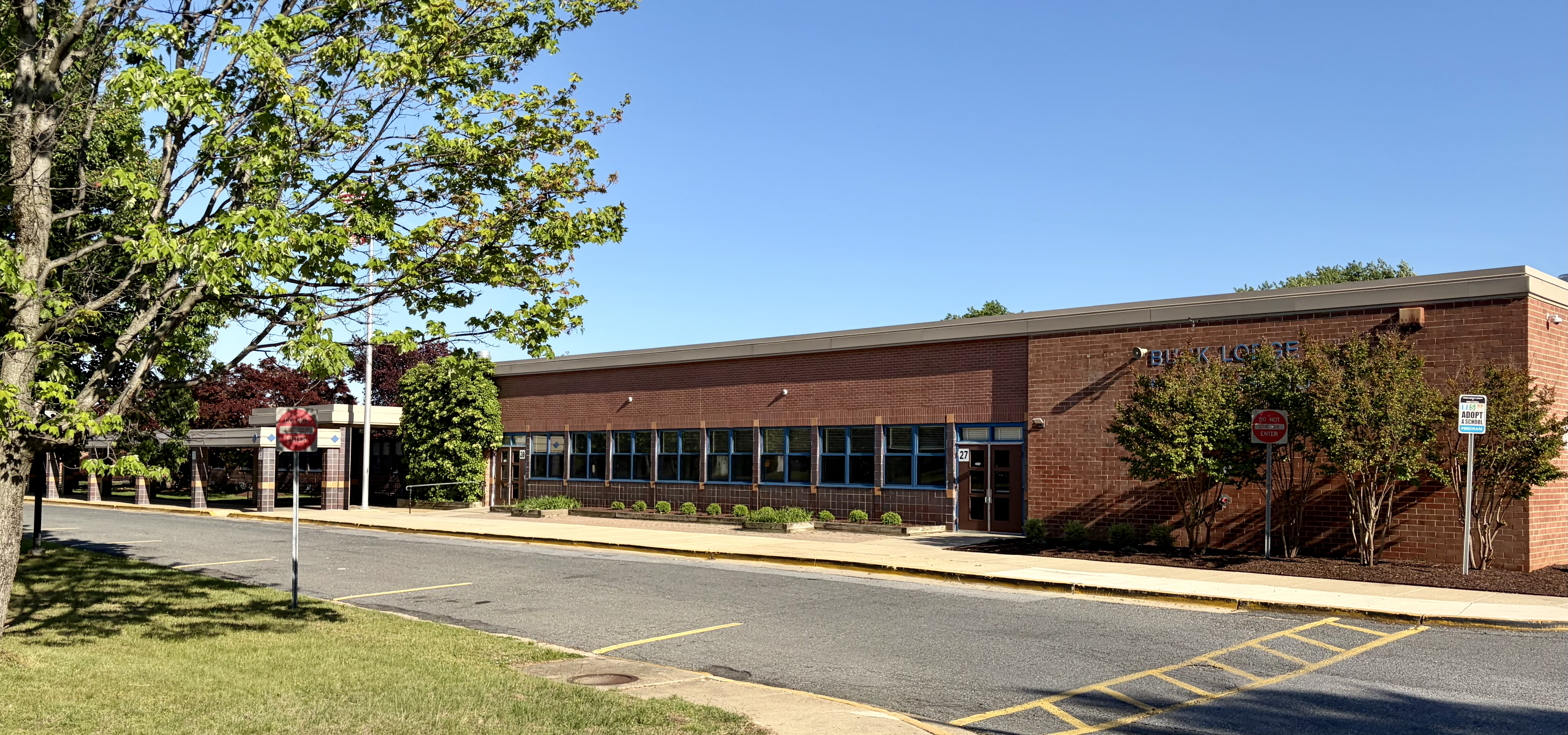
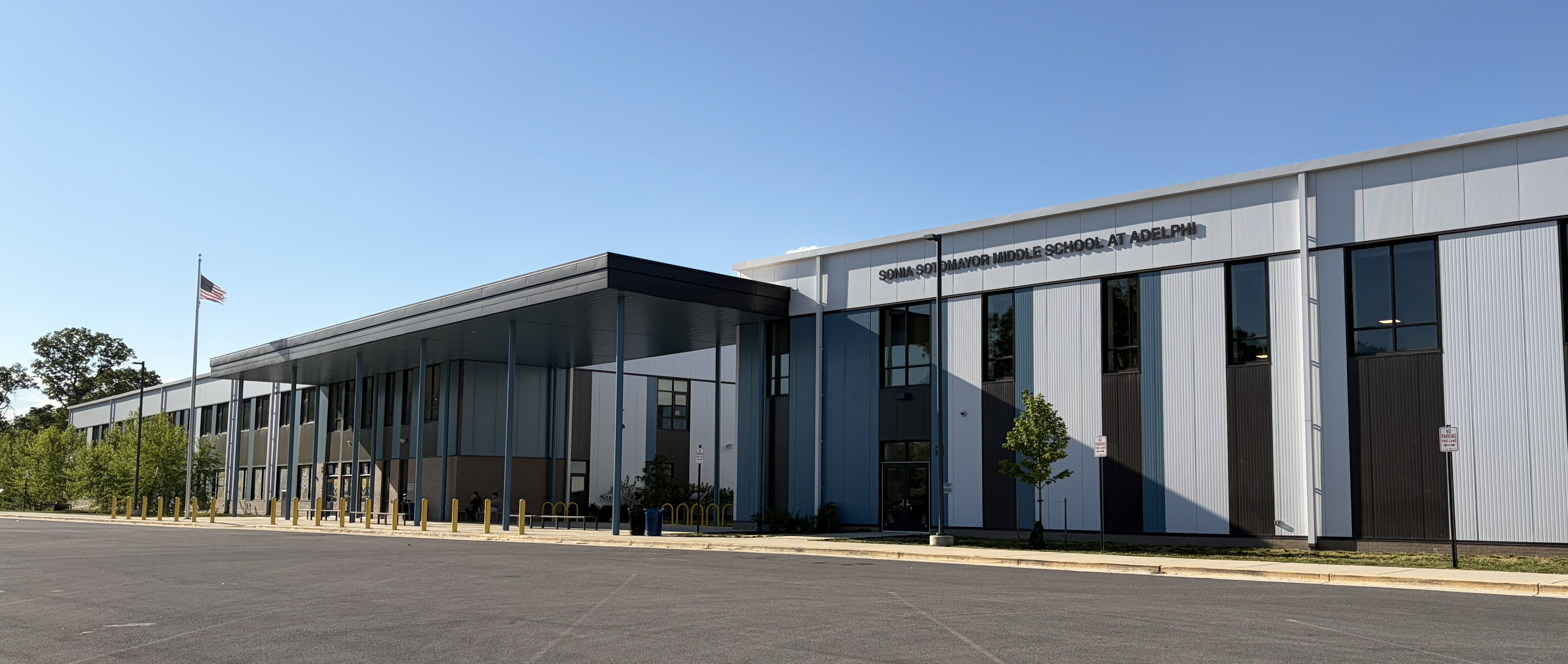
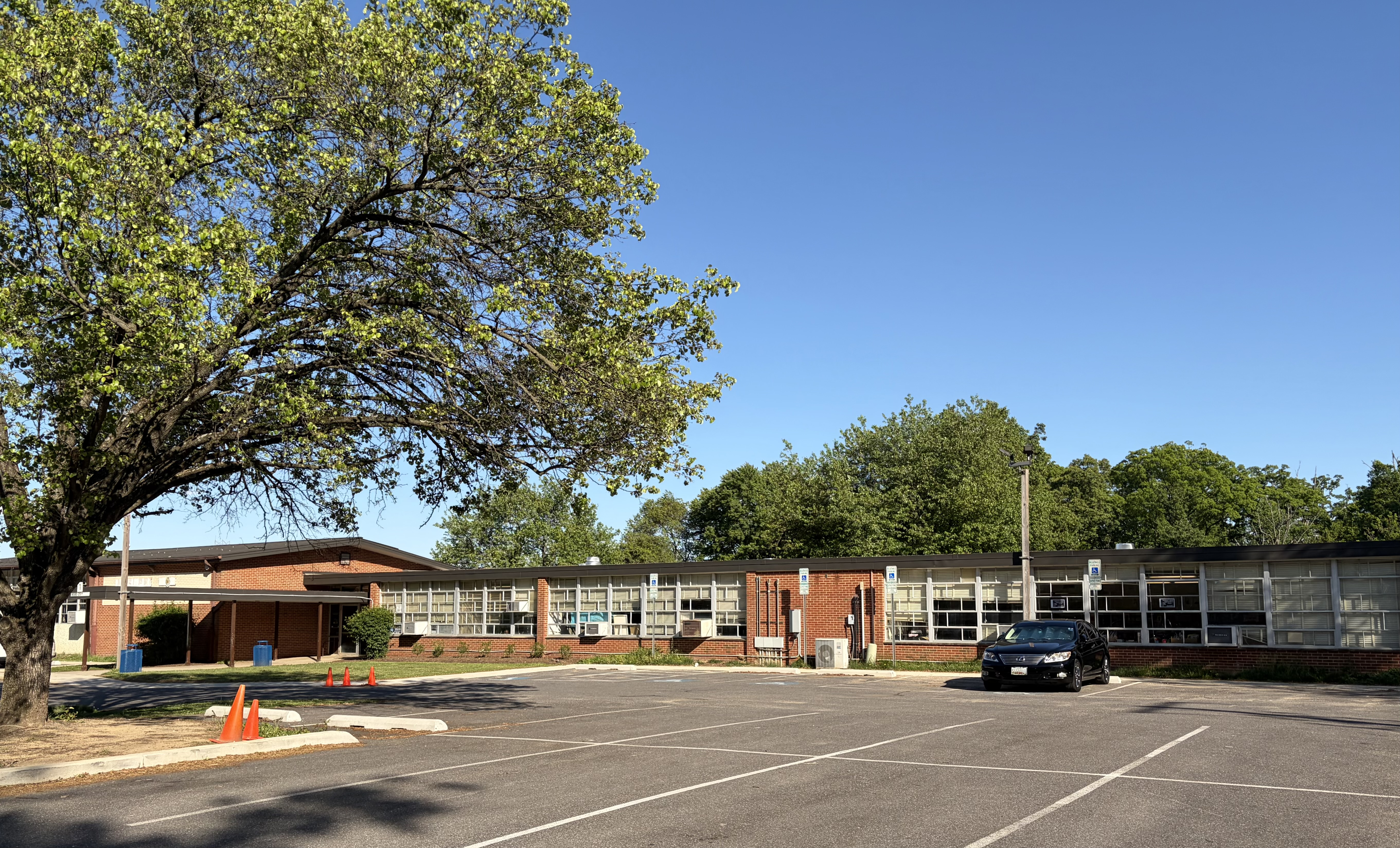
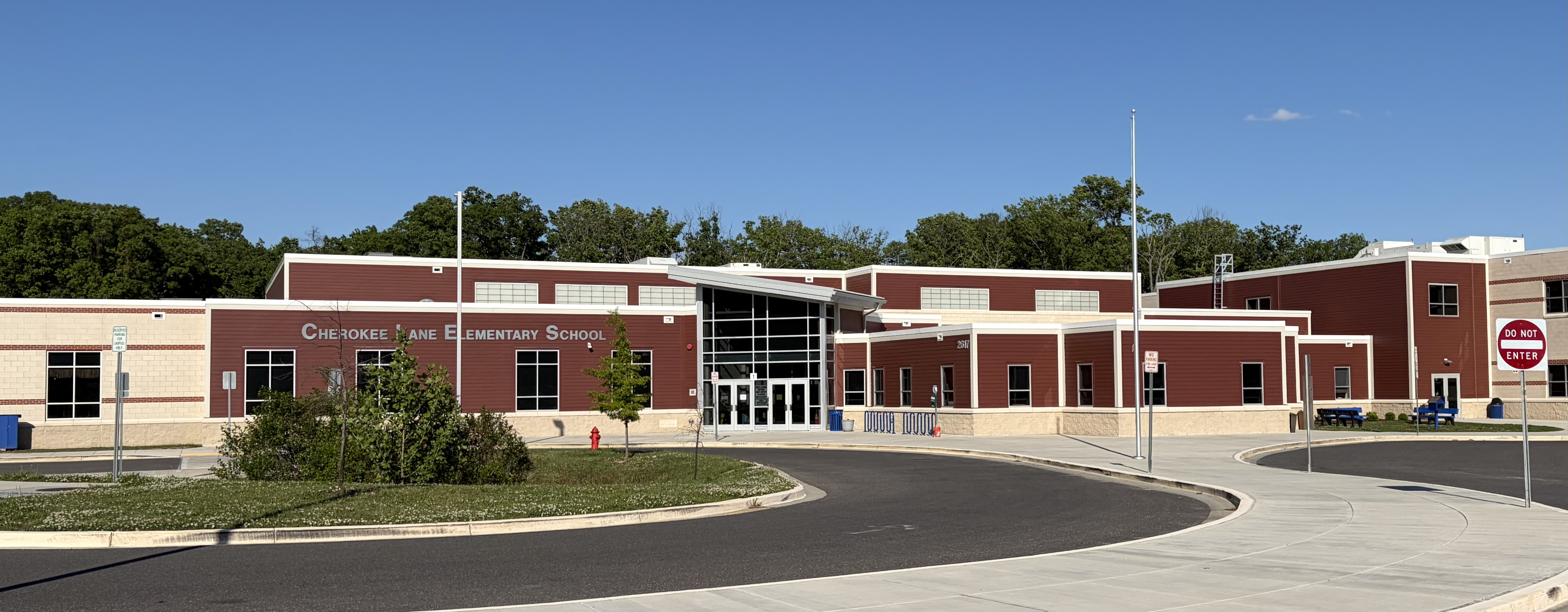
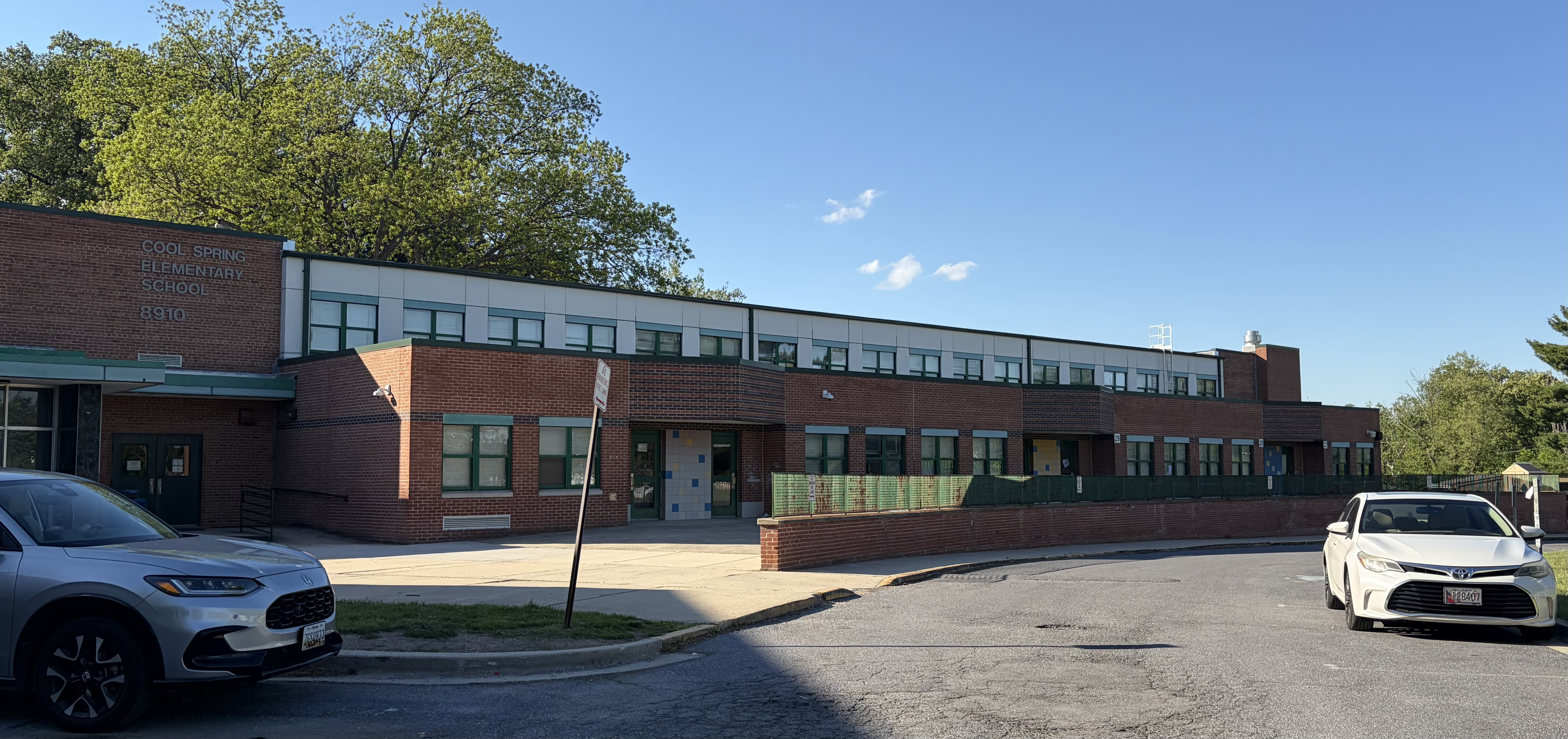
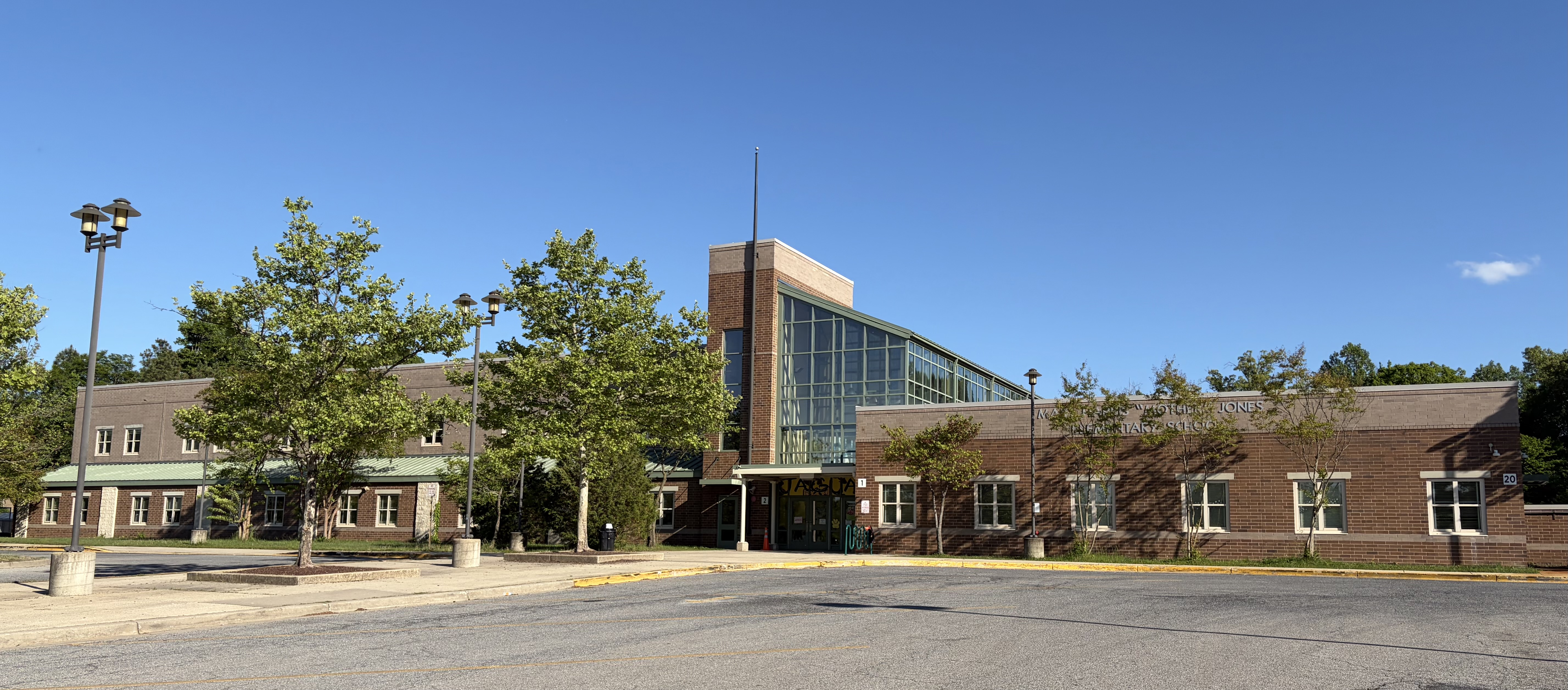
Schools in Adelphi include (from top left): Buck Lodge and Sonia Sotomayor Middle Schools; and Adelphi, Cherokee Lane, Cool Spring and Mary Harris "Mother" Jones elementary schools.

Adelphi is the home of the University of Maryland Global Campus, and the community is located near the University of Maryland main campus in College Park.

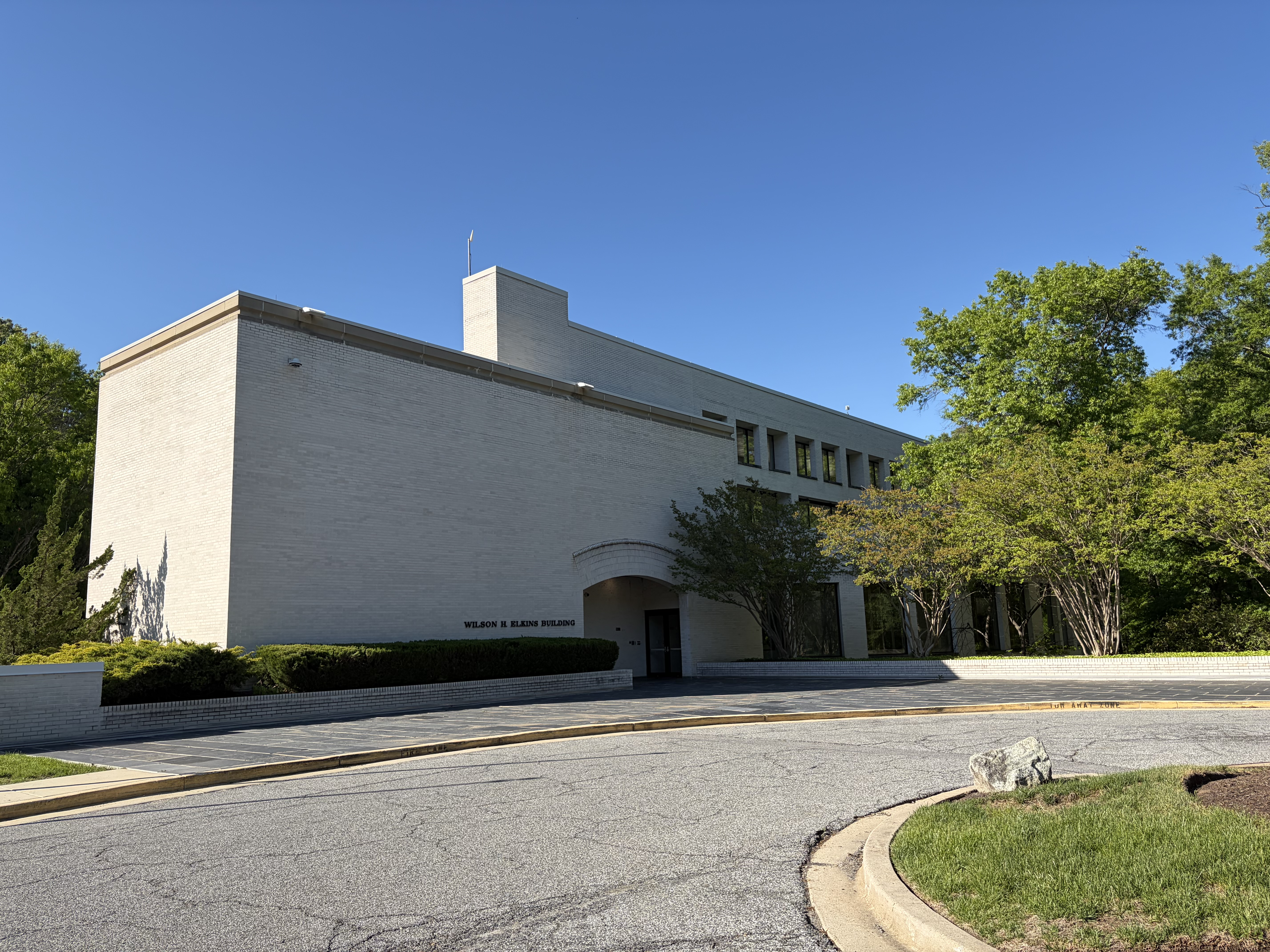
The Wilson H. Elkins Building, headquarters of the University System of Maryland in College Park, Maryland

Adelphi is served by the Prince George's County Public Schools system. In 2000, a new elementary school opened in the community dedicated to labor organizer Mary Harris "Mother" Jones.

Elementary schools in Adelphi:

- Adelphi Elementary School
- Cherokee Lane Elementary School
- Cool Spring Elementary School]
- Mary Harris "Mother" Jones Elementary School

A southeastern section is zoned to University Park Elementary School in University Park.

Two middle schools in Adelphi, Buck Lodge Middle School and Sonia Sotomayor Middle School, take up most of the CDP. Sotomayor Middle opened in 2023. Most residents are zoned to High Point High School in Beltsville. A southeastern section is zoned to Hyattsville Middle School and Northwestern High School in Hyattsville.

== Notable people ==
- John Fahey— Recorded the first Tacoma Records album at the St. Michaels and All Angels Church
- Fred Funk - professional golfer.
- Roy Hibbert - NBA player for the Indiana Pacers
- Mary Harris Jones (1837–1930) - Labor organizer known as "Mother" Jones
- Hugh V. Perkins (1918–1988) - educator, author, and professor of education, University of Maryland - College Park.

== See also ==
- Avenel-Hillandale, name of a census-designated place that was part of Adelphi in 1970.
