= Avenel =

Avenel may refer to:

- Avenel, Victoria, Australia
  - Avenel railway station
- Avenel-Hillandale, Maryland, a historic place near Washington, D.C.
- Avenel, New Jersey, United States
  - Avenel (NJT station)
- Avenel (Bedford, Virginia), a NRHP listing in Bedford, Virginia
- Avenel Cooperative Housing Project, a historic cooperative housing project in Silver Lake, Los Angeles, California
- TPC Potomac at Avenel Farms, a golf course in Potomac, Maryland
- The Avenel family of Scotland, including Robert Avenel

== See also ==
- Avenal, California, a city whose name means "oat field" in Spanish
- Avenal, New Zealand, a suburb of Invercargill
