= George Perkins =

George Perkins may refer to:

== Politicians ==
- George C. Perkins (1839–1923), U.S. Republican politician and governor of California
- George B. Perkins (1874–1955), American politician and businessman
- George D. Perkins (1840–1914), U.S. Representative from Iowa
- George Perkins Marsh (1801–1882), American diplomat and early environmentalist
- George Walbridge Perkins (1862–1920), American progressive leader; businessman
- George Walbridge Perkins Jr. (1895–1960), Assistant Secretary of State and US Ambassador to NATO

== Others ==
- George H. Perkins (1836–1899), Civil War era United States Navy officer
- George Henry Perkins (1844–1933), American naturalist
- George Perkins (cricketer) (1864–1933), English cricketer
- George Perkins (singer) (1942–2013), American soul singer
- George Perkins (footballer, born 1897) (1897-1967), English footballer, see List of Bury F.C. players (1–24 appearances)
