= Parkin =

Parkin may refer to:

- Parkin (cake), a type of cake
- Parkin (protein), a ligase
- Parkin (surname), people with the surname Parkin
- Parkin, a brand name of the drug trihexyphenidyl
- Parkin, a brand name of the drug profenamine

== Places ==
- Parkin, Arkansas, a city in the United States
  - Parkin Archeological State Park in Parkin, Arkansas, also known as Parkin Site

== See also ==
- Parkan, a brand name of the drug budipine
