= Jack Perkins =

Jack Perkins may refer to:

- Jack Perkins (Australian footballer) (1903–1955), Australian rules footballer
- Jack Perkins (English footballer) (born 2003), English association footballer
- Jack Perkins (actor) (1921–1998), American film actor
- Jack Perkins (reporter) (1933–2019), American reporter and anchorman
- Jack Perkins (racing driver) (born 1986), Australian V8 Supercar driver
- Jack Perkins (baseball) (born 1999), American baseball player

== See also ==
- John Perkins (disambiguation)
