= James Perkins =

James Perkins may refer to:

- James Perkins (businessman), British rave promoter and property developer
- James Perkins Jr. (born 1952/53), current mayor of Selma, Alabama
- James Alfred Perkins (1911–1998), political scientist and president of Cornell University
- James Ashbrook Perkins, professor of literature at Westminster College, Pennsylvania
- James Breck Perkins (1847–1919), historian and US congressman
- James H. Perkins (1876–1940), chairman of Citigroup
- James Woodbury Perkins (1840–1892), American politician in Wisconsin
- James "Soup" Perkins (1879–1911), American jockey
- Jim Perkins, character in 1967 film It
- Jim Perkins (American football)
- Jim Perkins (racing driver)
- Jimmy Perkins, character
- Jim Perkins (rugby union coach)

== See also ==
- James Perkin (disambiguation)
