= Hillandale, Maryland =

- Census-designated place
- Location of Hillandale, Maryland
- Coordinates: 39°01′30″N 76°58′25″W
- Country: United States
- State: Maryland
- Counties: Montgomery

Area
  - Total: 1.89 sq mi (4.89 km^{2})
  - Land: 1.89 sq mi (4.89 km^{2})
  - Water: 0 sq mi (0.00 km^{2})
- Elevation: 246 ft (75 m)

Population (2020)
  - Total: 5,774
  - Density: 3,056.6/sq mi (1,180.17/km^{2})
- Time zone: UTC-5 (Eastern (EST))
  - Summer (DST): UTC-4 (EDT)
- ZIP code: 20903
- Area codes: 301, 240
- FIPS code: 24-38850
- GNIS feature ID: 2389929

Hillandale is an unincorporated area and census-designated place located in Montgomery and Prince George's counties, Maryland, United States. As of the 2020 census, it had a population of 5,774. Hillandale is contained between the Prince George's / Montgomery County line to the east, the Anacostia River to the west, McCeney Avenue to the north, and D.C.'s Capital Beltway to the south. It borders the communities of Adelphi, Avenel, White Oak and Beltsville.

== Geography ==
Hillandale is part of the postal designation of Silver Spring.

According to the United States Census Bureau, the place has a total area of 2.0 square miles (5.3 km^{2}), all land.

In Montgomery County, Hillandale is bordered by the Silver Spring CDP to the south (across the Capital Beltway), the Four Corners CDP to the west (across the Northwest Branch Anacostia River), and the White Oak CDP to the north. In Prince George's County, Hillandale is bordered by the Beltsville CDP to the east (across the Paint Branch) and the Adelphi CDP to the south (across the Capital Beltway).

== Demographics ==
Historical population
Census	Pop.	Note	%±
2000	3,054		—
2010	6,043		97.9%
2020	5,774		−4.5%
U.S. Decennial Census; 2010 2020

=== Racial and ethnic composition ===
Hillandale CDP, Maryland – Racial and ethnic composition Note: the US Census treats Hispanic/Latino as an ethnic category. This table excludes Latinos from the racial categories and assigns them to a separate category. Hispanics/Latinos may be of any race.
Race / Ethnicity (NH = Non-Hispanic)	Pop 2000	Pop 2010	Pop 2020	% 2000	% 2010	% 2020
White alone (NH)	1,548	2,161	1,469	50.69%	35.76%	25.44%
Black or African American alone (NH)	767	1,464	1,399	25.11%	24.23%	24.23%
Native American or Alaska Native alone (NH)	14	14	5	0.46%	0.23%	0.09%
Asian alone (NH)	295	649	654	9.66%	10.74%	11.33%
Native Hawaiian or Pacific Islander alone (NH)	1	0	3	0.03%	0.00%	0.05%
Other race alone (NH)	16	22	27	0.52%	0.36%	0.47%
Mixed race or Multiracial (NH)	65	138	189	2.13%	2.28%	3.27%
Hispanic or Latino (any race)	348	1,595	2,028	11.39%	26.39%	35.12%
Total	3,054	6,043	5,774	100.00%	100.00%	100.00%

=== 2020 census ===
As of the 2020 census, Hillandale had a population of 5,774. The median age was 40.1 years. 20.2% of residents were under the age of 18, and 18.1% were 65 years of age or older. For every 100 females, there were 102.3 males, and for every 100 females age 18 and over, there were 99.1 males.

100.0% of residents lived in urban areas, while 0.0% lived in rural areas.

There were 1,717 households, of which 33.3% had children under the age of 18 living in them. Of all households, 58.2% were married-couple households, 14.3% had a male householder with no spouse or partner present, and 22.5% had a female householder with no spouse or partner present. About 18.1% of all households were made up of individuals, and 10.2% had someone living alone who was 65 years of age or older.

There were 1,877 housing units, of which 8.5% were vacant. The homeowner vacancy rate was 0.7%, and the rental vacancy rate was 7.5%.

=== 2000 census ===
As of the census of 2000, there were 3,054 people, 1,087 households, and 846 families residing in the area. The population density was 2,465.6 inhabitants per square mile (952.0/km^{2}). There were 1,110 housing units at an average density of 896.2 per square mile (346.0/km^{2}). The racial makeup of the area was 55.40% White, 25.57% African American, 0.46% Native American, 9.66% Asian, 0.03% Pacific Islander, 5.86% from other races, and 3.01% from two or more races. Hispanic or Latino of any race were 11.39% of the population.

There were 1,087 households, out of which 27.3% had children under the age of 18 living with them, 66.1% were married couples living together, 7.7% had a female householder with no husband present, and 22.1% were non-families. 16.9% of all households were made up of individuals, and 7.9% had someone living alone who was 65 years of age or older. The average household size was 2.80 and the average family size was 3.13.

In the area, the population was spread out, with 20.0% under the age of 18, 7.1% from 18 to 24, 25.1% from 25 to 44, 29.1% from 45 to 64, and 18.6% who were 65 years of age or older. The median age was 44 years. For every 100 females, there were 99.6 males. For every 100 females age 18 and over, there were 95.1 males.

The median income for a household in the area was $75,650, and the median income for a family was $88,802. Males had a median income of $46,107 versus $36,724 for females. The per capita income for the area was $27,861. About 1.1% of families and 3.3% of the population were below the poverty line, including none of those under age 18 and 5.0% of those age 65 or over.

== Education ==
Hillandale residents in Montgomery County are zoned to Montgomery County Public Schools while those in Prince George's County are zoned to Prince George's County Public Schools.

Prince George's residents are zoned to Cherokee Lane Elementary School, Buck Lodge Middle School, and High Point High School.

== See also ==
- Avenel-Hillandale, name of a census-designated place in 1970.
