= John Perkins =

John Perkins may refer to:

- John Perkins (Australian politician) (1878–1954), Australian politician
- John Perkins (author) (born 1945), American author of Confessions of an Economic Hit Man
- John Perkins (rugby union) (born 1954), Wales international rugby union player
- John Perkins Jr. (1819–1885), American politician, son of John Perkins Sr.
- John Perkins Sr. (1781–1866), American judge and planter
- John Perkins (physician) (1698–1781), American physician and essayist
- John M. Perkins (1930–2026), American civil rights activist, American Christian minister, author
- Johnny Perkins (1953–2007), American football receiver with the New York Giants
- John Perkins (Royal Navy officer) (fl. 1775–1812), Captain, Napoleonic War
- John Alanson Perkins (1914–1982), American academic administrator and government official
- John Frederick Perkins (1910–1983), English entomologist
- John Perkins (academic) (born 1950), British academic, engineering scientist and government adviser
- John Astin Perkins (1907–1999), interior designer and architect
- John Perkins (cricketer) (1837–1901), English cricketer

== See also ==
- Jack Perkins (disambiguation)
- John (given name)
- John Bryan Ward-Perkins (1912–1981), British Classical architectural historian
- John Perkins Cushing (1787–1862), American sea merchant, opium smuggler, and philanthropist
- Professor John Perkins' Review of Engineering Skills
- Perkins (disambiguation)
