= James Perkin =

James Perkin may refer to:

- James Perkin (academic), President of Acadia University
- James Perkin (ice hockey), 2008–09 Bowling Green Falcons men's ice hockey season

== See also ==
- James Perkins (disambiguation)
