= Soundhawk =

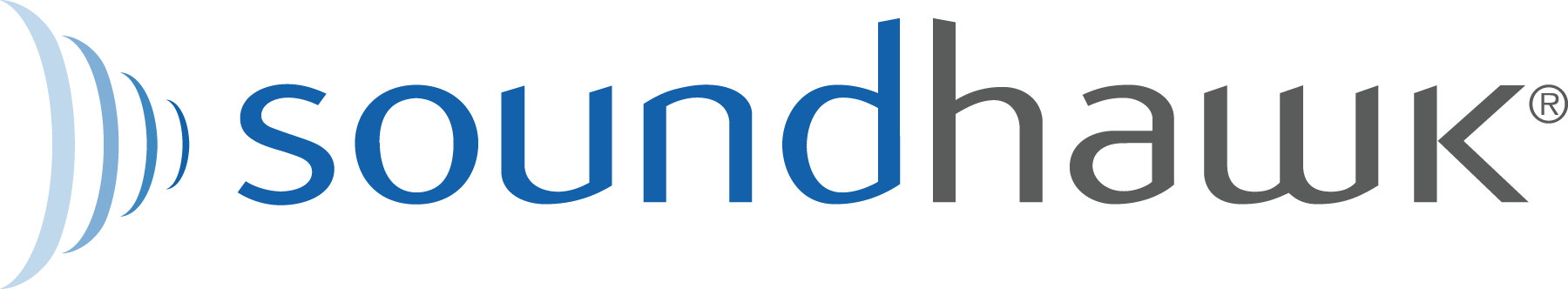
- Type: Private
- Industry: wearable technology, sound technology
- Founder: Rodney Perkins
- Headquarters: Cupertino, California, US

Soundhawk was an American corporation headquartered in Cupertino, California.

In June 2014 Soundhawk introduced a "Smart Listening System", a hearing aid designed for noisy situations. The Soundhawk product came with three pieces of hardware: an earphone called a "Scoop", a wireless microphone, and a charging case. The product line used mobile applications and could be personalized to different environments.

The company has been defunct since around 2016.

== Company history ==
Soundhawk was founded by Rodney Perkins, Stanford University School of Medicine, Otologist. He is also the founder of ReSound and the California Ear Institute at Stanford University Executive leadership at Soundhawk includes Perkins as CEO; Drew Dundas, formerly director of Audiology and Assistant Professor of Otolaryngology at UCSF as President and Chief Technology Officer; Steve Manser former engineering leader at Apple, Inc., Palm, Inc., and Hewlett-Packard, as Chief Operations Officer and Vice President of Engineering. The Soundhawk product was built by a group of former hardware and software engineers from Palm, Inc., Apple, Inc., Hewlett-Packard, and Amazon.com.

Soundhawk is backed by True Ventures, Foxconn Technology Group and other Silicon Valley entrepreneurs.

Soundhawk has suspended operation as per their official website, which as of October 1, 2016 reads "down for maintenance, check back soon". As of March 2018, support pages are no longer available as the domain name connections have expired; nor can it be found through the Apple Store. Amazon.com also lists the device, but says it's currently not available, and they don't know when it will be.

== Product ==
Soundhawk's Smart Listening System included three pieces of hardware: the Scoop, the Wireless Mic and the Charging Case. This system was controlled via a mobile app.

The Soundhawk app was used to set up and personalize the system and was available for download to iOS and Android. The app enabled individual hearing profiles to be created for different acoustic environments.

The Scoop was an earphone that used adaptive audio processing to enhance specific sound frequencies while reducing background noise. The Scoop connects to users' phones or tablets via Bluetooth.

The system's wireless mic was used to identify specific sounds in different environments to facilitate noise cancellation. The mic could be clipped to clothing, or placed on a table.

The product also came with a charging case, and could also be used for phone calls or other smartphone functions such as virtual assistants.
