= Westminster College (Pennsylvania) =

Private college in New Wilmington, Pennsylvania, US

Coordinates: 41°7′4″N 80°19′46″W

- Type: Private
- Established: 1852; 174 years ago
- Religious affiliation: Presbyterian Church (USA)
- Endowment: $143.7 million (2025)
- President: Kathy Brittain Richardson
- Undergraduates: 1,238
- Location: New Wilmington, Pennsylvania, United States
- Campus: Small Town, 300 acres (120 ha)
- Colors: (Navy blue and white)
- Nickname: Titans
- Website: westminster.edu
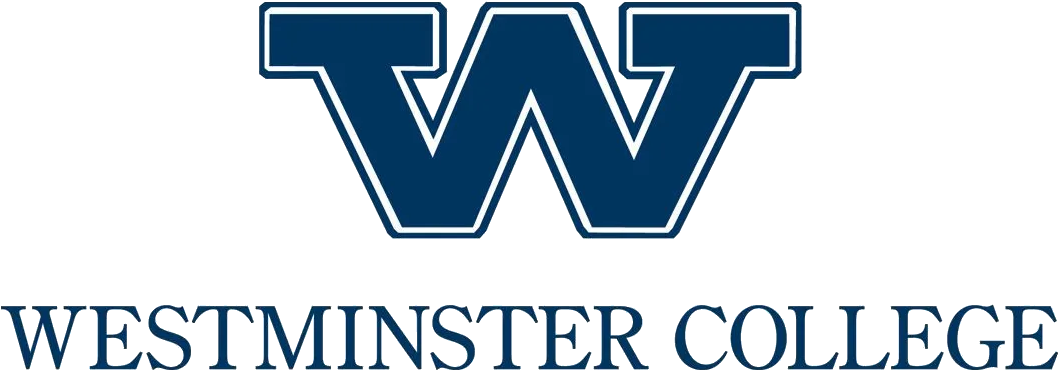

Westminster College is a private liberal arts college in New Wilmington, Pennsylvania, United States. Founded in 1852, it is affiliated with the Presbyterian Church (USA). The student population includes approximately 1,300 undergraduate and graduate students.

== History ==
Westminster was formed as a result of a meeting on January 21, 1852, between the Ohio and Shenango Presbyteries.

== Campus ==
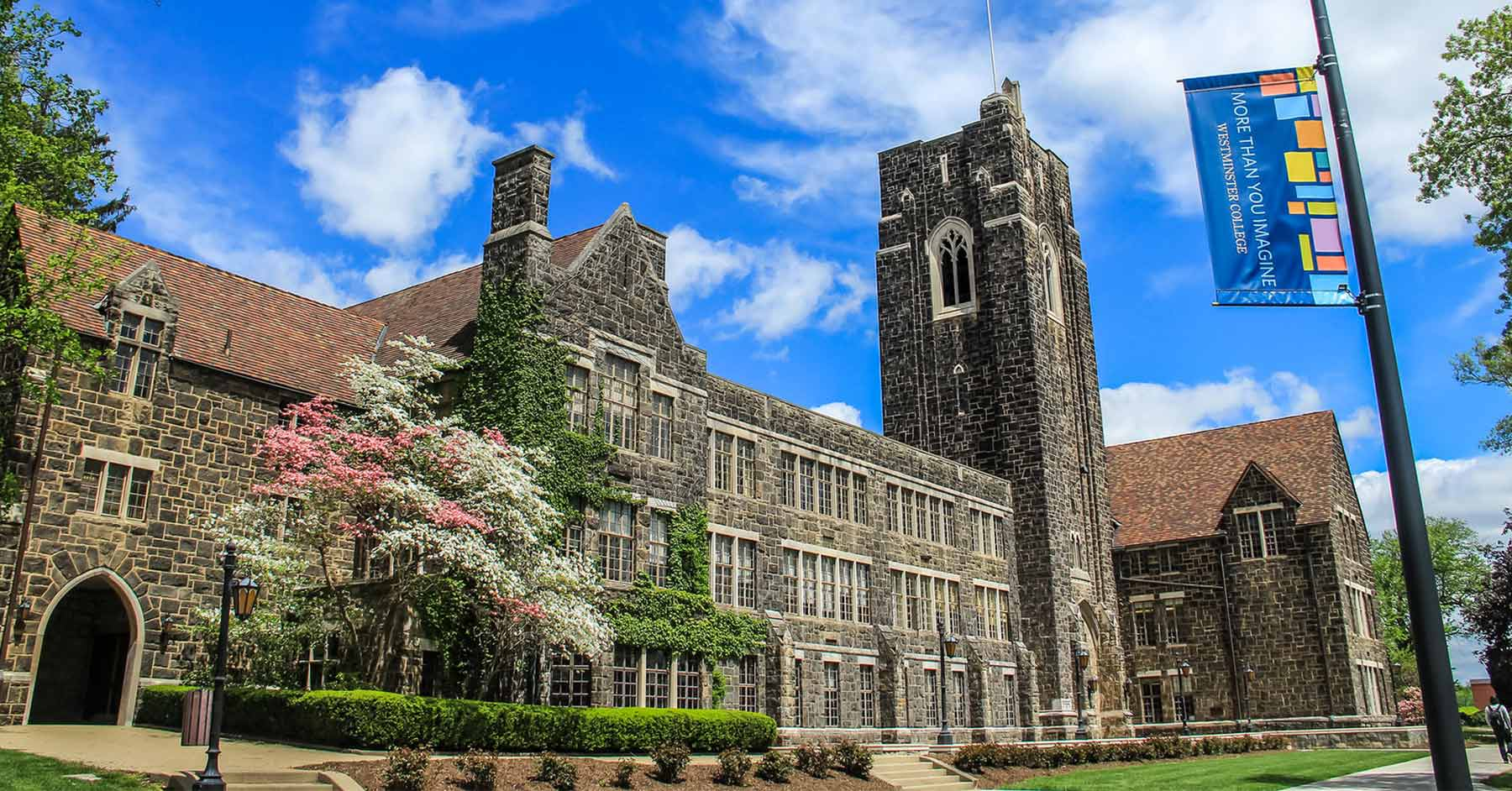
Old Main at Westminster College

Westminster is located in New Wilmington, Pennsylvania, a town of approximately 2,100 residents located 50 miles (80 km) north of Pittsburgh and 80 miles (130 km) south of Erie and Cleveland on a 300-acre (120 ha) campus. The S. R. Thompson House was built by college professor S. R. Thompson in 1884 and is now a dormitory.

== Academics ==
Westminster College is accredited by the Middle States Commission on Higher Education. In the 2026 U.S. News & World Report college rankings, Westminster College was ranked 12th among "Regional Colleges North". Westminster College had been named one of the nation's top 100 liberal arts colleges by The Washington Monthly in its 2025 College Guide and Rankings.

== Student organizations ==
The college has a Student Government Association that exists primarily for governing and providing entertainment for the student body. There are four fraternities and five sororities at Westminster College, and approximately half of the student body is involved in Greek life.

Student publications include The Holcad, a weekly student newspaper; Argo, the university's student-run yearbook; and Scrawl, an annual literary magazine. The Holcad was started in 1884. Westminster's radio station, WWNW Titan Radio serves Lawrence County, Pennsylvania. The station streams online and features a hot adult contemporary format. Programming includes live local sports for Wilmington Area High School and various Westminster Titans teams. Titan Radio is a broadcast member of the Pennsylvania Associated Press and the Pennsylvania Association of Broadcasters. Westminster's television station is the Westminster Cable Network, which covers local news and sports.

== Athletics ==
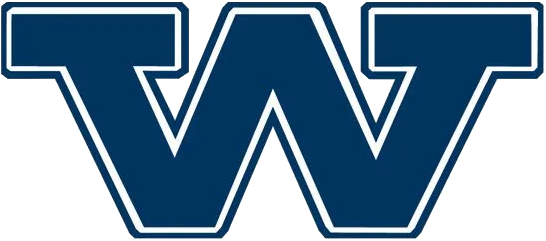
Westminster athletics monogram

The Westminster Titans compete in NCAA Division III athletics. Before moving to the NCAA, Westminster competed in the National Association of Intercollegiate Athletics (NAIA) for many years. For a brief period, Westminster was a member of the NCAA Division II Great Lakes Intercollegiate Athletic Conference (GLIAC). The Titans currently are a member of the Presidents' Athletic Conference.

The first official football game by the Westminster Titans was in December 1891, which they lost to Geneva, 42–0. The next year was the first official season, during which Westminster played four games and went 3–1. The Titans won the NAIA Division II Football National Championship six times, during 1970, 1976, 1977, 1988, 1989, and 1994. While competing in NAIA Division II, Westminster had 11 undefeated seasons.

Westminster men's basketball team lost in the national NAIA title game twice (1960 and 1962) under coach Charles "Buzz" Ridl. Ridl was inducted into the NAIA Hall of Fame (1969), the Western Pennsylvania Coaches Hall of Fame (1980), and the Pennsylvania Sports Hall of Fame (1992).

== Notable alumni ==
- Eric Burns – author, media critic, broadcast journalist
- David S. Cercone – U.S. federal judge
- Amy Marie Charles – professor of English literature at The University of North Carolina at Greensboro
- Thomas C. Cochran – congressman, R-PA, 70th–74th Congresses (1927–1935)
- Thomas DiLorenzo – Austrian School economist and author, Professor at Loyola University in Baltimore
- JD Eicher – singer, songwriter, and producer
- Jennifer Elvgren – writer
- William N. Johnston – president of Wesley College (Delaware) 2002–2015
- Joe Jordano – college baseball coach at Pittsburgh
- Tim Kaiser – producer of Seinfeld and Will & Grace and 2 Broke Girls
- James Kennedy – Congressman, R-OH (1903–1911)
- Gerald LaValle – Pennsylvania State Senator (1971 M.Ed.)
- Mark Longietti – Pennsylvania State Representative (2006–present)
- Amber Mariano née Brkich – reality television personality (winner of Survivor: All-Stars), married to Rob Mariano
- Andrew McKelvey – chairman and CEO of Monster.com (December 1996 – October 2006)
- Joe Micchia – 2013 College Football Hall of Fame inductee
- Daniel Migliore – theologian and author; professor emeritus, Princeton Theological Seminary
- Samuel Henry Miller – congressman, R-PA, 47th, 48th, and 64th Congresses (1881–1885, 1915–1917)
- Gladys Milligan – painter
- David W. Orr – chair and professor of environmental studies at Oberlin College in Ohio and influential figure in educational reform
- Deborah Platt Majoras – chairman of the Federal Trade Commission (August 2004 – 2008)
- Greg Nicotero - special make-up effects creator, television producer, and director
- M. Richard Rose (1955–2021) – former President of Alfred University and the Rochester Institute of Technology
- Jerry Schmitt – football head coach at Duquesne University, former player and coach at Westminster
- Norman Shepherd – theologian and pastor
- Louis Skurcenski – Westminster College Sports Hall of Fame (1988) and Phillips 66er
- R. C. Sproul – theologian and founder of Ligonier Ministries

== Notable faculty ==
- Wes Craven – English
- James Ashbrook Perkins – English and public relations
