= Parkins =

Parkins is a surname, and may refer to:

- Andrea Parkins (born 2000), American composer and musician
- Barbara Parkins (born 1942), Canadian actress
- Christopher Parkins (died 1622), English Jesuit turned diplomat and MP
- Danny Parkins (born 1986), American sportswriter, talk show host, and podcaster
- David Parkins (born 1955), British cartoonist and illustrator
- George Parkins, Member of the Parliament of England
- Howy Parkins (born 1901), American animator and director
- Joan Parkins (1922–2013), Canadian figure skater
- John Parkins (1571–1640), English merchant and politician
- Robert Michael Parkins (died 2005), English fraudster
- William Parkins (1925–1969), English cricketer
- William H. Parkins (1836–1894), American architect
- Zeena Parkins (born 1956), American musician

== See also ==
- Parkin (surname)
- Perkins
- Perkin (surname)
