= Perkin (surname) =

Perkin is a surname. Notable people with the surname include:

- Graham Perkin (1929–1975), Australian journalist and newspaper editor
- Richard Scott Perkin (1906–1969), American entrepreneur
- William Henry Perkin (1838–1907), English chemist
- William Henry Perkin, Jr. (1860–1929), English organic chemist, son of William Henry Perkin
- Arthur George Perkin (1861–1937), English chemist, son of William Henry Perkin

== See also ==
- Perkins
- Parkin (surname)
- Parkins
