= Edwin Perkins =

Edwin Perkins may refer to:

- Edwin Perkins (inventor) (1889–1961), American inventor of the Kool-Aid powder drink mix
- Edwin Perkins (politician) (1855–1937), British Conservative Party politician
- Ed Perkins (born 1953), Canadian mathematician
