= James Ashbrook Perkins =

American poet

James Ashbrook Perkins is Professor Emeritus of English and Public Relations at Westminster College, New Wilmington, Pennsylvania, where he became a faculty member in 1973 and was department chair from 2000 to 2005.

== Education ==
Perkins earned his BA from Centre College, Danville, Kentucky, in 1963, an MA from Miami University, Oxford, Ohio, in 1965, and a PhD from the University of Tennessee, Knoxville in 1972.

== Career ==
After receiving his doctorate, he was appointed assistant professor at the University of Tennessee, Knoxville, in 1971. He moved to Westminster in 1973 and is now retired as an emeritus professor. He was a Visiting Fulbright professor in Korea, 1998, and was a National Endowment for the Humanities fellow four times, in 1978, 1981, 1987, and 1989.

Perkins was appointed Special Program Chair for the Centenary of the birth of Robert Penn Warren and was instrumental in securing the release of a stamp honoring him by the United States Postal Service; the governor of Kentucky named him a Kentucky Colonel in recognition.

== Academic works ==
Perkins has published books on Warren and on David Madden.

- (coedited with Randy Hendricks) David Madden: A Writer for All Genres, Knoxville: University of Tennessee Press, 2006
- (editor) The Cass Mastern Material: The Core of Robert Penn Warren's "All the King's Men", Baton Rouge: Louisiana State University Press, 2005
- (coedited with James A Grimshaw) Robert Penn Warren's All the King's Men: Three Stage Versions, Athens, Georgia: University of Georgia Press, 2000
- (coedited with Randy Hendricks) For the Record: A Robert Drake Reader, Macon: Mercer University Press, 2001
- (coedited with William Bedford Clark and Randy Hendricks) Selected Letters of Robert Penn Warren vol. 3: Triumph and Transition 1943–1952; vol. 4: New Beginnings and New Directions, 1953–1968; vol. 5: Backward Glances and New Visions, 1969–1979; vol. 6, Toward Sunset, at a Great Height, 1980–1989, Baton Rouge: Louisiana State University Press.
- (coedited with Jeffrey J. Folks) Southern Writers at Century's End, Lexington, Kentucky: University Press of Kentucky, 1997
- (coedited with Carol Morrow) Interviews with David Madden, Newfound Press, 2014
- (editor) The Last Bizarre Tale: Stories by David Madden, Knoxville: University of Pennessee Press, 2014

== Creative works ==
=== Poetry ===
- The Woodcarver, 1978.
- The Amish 2, Perceptions 2, 1981.
- Brother enemy: Poems of the Korean War edited and translated by Suh Ji-Moon; in collaboration with James A. Perkins. Buffalo, N.Y.: White Pine Press, 2002.
- Decembers: Poems, Macon: Mercer University Press, 2013

=== Fiction ===
- Snakes, Butterbeans and the Discovery of Electricity, Macon: Mercer University Press, 2003
