= William Perkins =

William or Bill Perkins may refer to:

== Sports ==
- Bill Perkins (American football) (1941–2016), American football running back
- Bill Perkins (Australian rules footballer) (1920–2009), ex-Richmond VFL footballer
- Bill Perkins (baseball) (1906–1958), Negro league baseball player
- Bill Perkins (footballer, born 1876) (1876–1940), formerly of Liverpool FC
- William Perkins (New Zealand cricketer) (born 1934), New Zealand cricketer
- William Perkins (West Indian cricketer) (born 1986), West Indian cricketer

== Other ==
- Bill Perkins (businessman) (born 1969), American hedge fund manager, film producer, and poker player
- Bill Perkins (politician) (1949–2023), member of the New York State Senate
- Bill Perkins (saxophonist) (1924–2003), jazz musician of the West Coast "Cool" school
- William Perkins (author), British author
- William Perkins, English merchant and founder of Sir William Perkins's School, Chertsey
- William Perkins, main character in Roald Dahl's short story "Galloping Foxley"
- William Perkins (MP) (c. 1400–c. 1449), English landowner and MP
- William Perkins (theologian) (1558–1602), Puritan clergyman and Cambridge theologian
- William Henry Perkins, better known as Moccasin Bill Perkins (1825–1904), hunter, miner, and frontiersman
- William L. Perkins (died 1957), American architect
- William T. Perkins Jr. (1947–1967), United States Marine and Medal of Honor recipient

== See also ==
- William Henry Perkin (1838–1907), British chemist
