= Avenel-Hillandale, Maryland =

Avenel-Hillandale
- Former CDP
- Location within the state of Maryland Avenel-Hillandale (the United States)
- Coordinates: 39°00′46″N 76°58′41″W
- Country: United States
- State: Maryland
- Counties: Montgomery & Prince George's

Area
  - Land: 3.5 sq mi (9.1 km^{2})

Population (1970)
  - Total: 19,520
  - Density: 5,600/sq mi (2,100/km^{2})
- Time zone: UTC−5 (Eastern (EST))
  - Summer (DST): UTC−4 (EDT)
- ZIP codes: 20783 & 20903
- Area code(s): 301 & 240
- FIPS code: 24-03225

Avenel-Hillandale was a Census-designated place in Montgomery and Prince George's Counties in Maryland during the 1970 United States census. which consists of the communities of Avenel, Hillandale and Adelphi. The population in 1970 was 19,520. The census area reorganized to the present day CDPs of Hillandale and Adelphi in 1980. The ZIP codes serving the area are 20783 and 20903.

== Geography ==
Located at 39.0130 north and 76.9783 west, the census area of Avenel-Hillandale was bordered by the census areas of Silver Spring to the west, White Oak to the north, Beltsville to the northeast, Langley Park to the southwest and the city of College Park to the southeast. The land area of the CDP was 3.5 square miles and a population density of 5,577 persons per sq. mi.
