= John Perkins (physician) =

American physician and essayist

John Perkins (1698–1781) was an American physician and essayist.

Born in Lynn, Massachusetts to John Perkins and Anna (née Huchason) Perkins. He married Abigail (née Lee) Perkins. Together, the couple had two children: William Lee Perkins and Isaac Perkins.

Perkins opened a medical practice in Boston. A prolific essayist, he published works on topics such as weather phenomena and comets. Perkins became well known among his contemporaries and regularly corresponded with Benjamin Franklin on topics as diverse as smallpox, colds, tornadoes, and coal formation. He submitted a paper on hurricanes, tornadoes, and water spouts to the American Philosophical Society, which put him on the Society’s map and ultimately made him a member. While Benjamin Franklin was in Paris, he received an account from Perkins on epidemic catarrhal fevers, and recommended it to the Société de la Médecine. The paper then appeared in the Histoire de la Société de la Médecine, and subsequently earned Perkins election to the Société. He was elected as a member of the American Philosophical Society in 1774.

During the siege of Boston, he moved back to Lynn, the town of his birth, and died there not long after. He is buried at the Old Burying Ground in Lynnfield, Massachusetts.
