= J. Will Perkins =

American politician (died 1926)

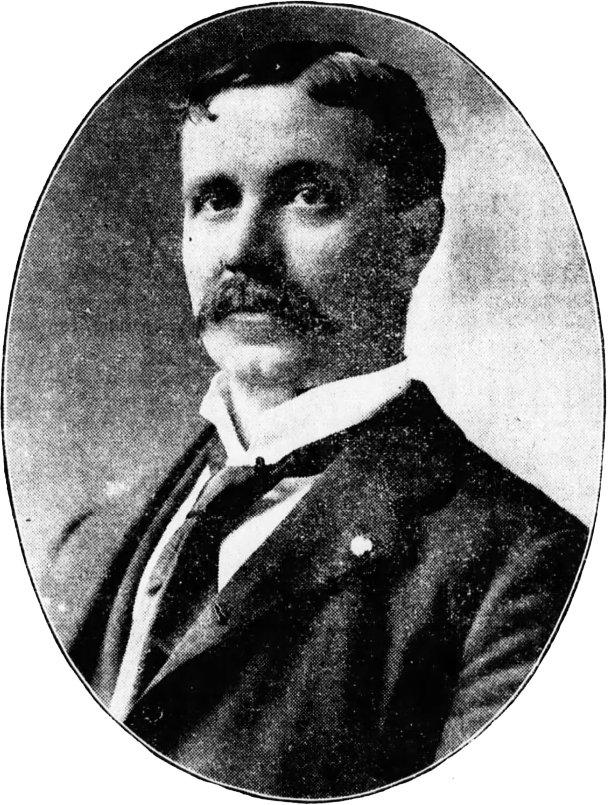
- Perkins in 1905 newspaper

Member of the Maryland House of Delegates from the Cecil County district
- In office 1924–1924 Serving with J. Frank Brickley and George L. Ewing

Personal details
- Died: February 13, 1926 Elkton, Maryland, U.S.
- Resting place: Elkton Cemetery
- Party: Republican
- Spouse: Lena Hinchliffe
- Children: 3
- Occupation: Politician; businessman

J. Will Perkins (died February 13, 1926) was an American politician from Maryland. He served as a member of the Maryland House of Delegates, representing Cecil County in 1924.

== Early life ==
J. Will Perkins was born to John Perkins. He succeeded his father in running his harness and saddlery business in Elkton, Maryland.

== Career ==
Perkins was a Republican. In 1905, Perkins ran for county treasurer of Cecil County, but lost. In 1907, Perkins ran for sheriff of Cecil County, but lost to Henry G. Hager. In 1912, Perkins was appointed as sheriff of Cecil County by Governor Phillips Lee Goldsborough after the death of J. Myron Miller. He ran for sheriff in 1913, but lost to John A. Morgan.

Perkins was a member of the Maryland House of Delegates, representing Cecil County, in 1924.

Perkins was senior member of the fruit juice manufacturer Perkins and Perkins at the time of his death.

== Personal life ==
Perkins married Lena Hinchliffe, daughter of Joseph Hincliffe. He had three children, Joseph H., Elizabeth and Salina (or Senena). He was a member of the board of Elkton Methodist Episcopal Church.

Perkins died on February 13, 1926, at the age of 64 or 65, at his home in Elkton. He was buried at Elkton Cemetery.
