= Dmitry Parkin =

Russian 3D-artist and game developer (born 1982)

- Дмитрий Паркин
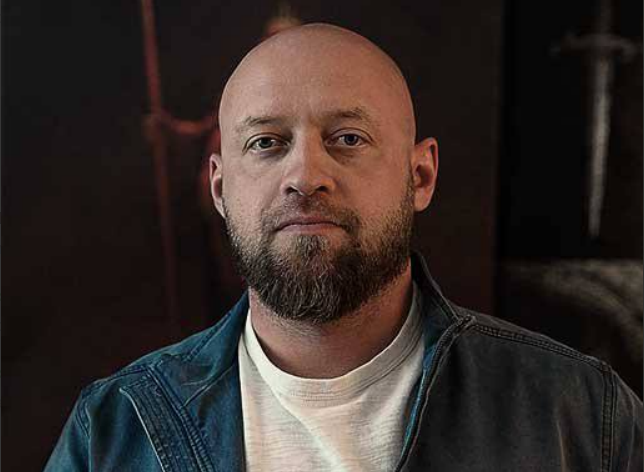
- Parkin in 2025
- Born: 10 August 1982 (age 43); Saratov, Russian SFSR, Soviet Union
- Occupations: Artist; digital sculptor; character and creature designer
- Style: Horror, dark fantasy
- Website: dmitryparkin.com

Dmitry Aleksandrovich Parkin (Russian: Дмитрий Александрович Паркин, born 10 August 1982) is a Russian 3D-artist and computer graphics specialist. He is best known for creating characters and creatures in video games. He is the co-founder of Cold Symmetry studio and co-creator of the Mortal Shell universe.

In addition to 3D graphics, Parkin works in different techniques, including painting, pencil drawing, and casting. Parkin's creative style is characterized by an interest in abstraction, fauna, flora, figurative images, and animals. It is an alternative reality or the evolution of post-human life; it is neither humans nor animals in their usual forms, is often dark and atmospheric, incorporating surreal and grotesque elements.

Some of his works are held in private collections in the United States, Czech Republic, Spain, and Russia.

== Career ==
Parkin began his professional career as a 3D artist working on Paradise Cracked (2000) at Mist Land studio. He later worked at Akella and Sibilant, contributing to various game projects.

In 2008, he participated in Dominance War III, an international character art competition, and won first place in the "3D" category with his character Imrod.

In 2007, Parkin transitioned to freelance work, collaborating with international game studios as a character, creature, and props artist. Over his 20-year career, he has witnessed and adapted to all major technological shifts in game development, working on projects across multiple console generations, from PlayStation 2 to PlayStation 5. Notable titles include:

- Fallout 3 (2008)
- Killzone 3 (2011)
- Halo: The Master Chief Collection (2014)
- The Order: 1886 (2015)
- Metro: Last Light (2013)
- Metro Exodus (2019)

In 2019, Parkin moved to the United States and joined Sucker Punch Productions as a senior character artist, working on Ghost of Tsushima (2020), which won "Best Art Direction" at The Game Awards 2020.

In 2021, he left studio work to focus entirely on Cold Symmetry, the independent studio he cofounded in 2017 with Vitaly Bulgarov, Anton Gonzalez, and Andrew McLennan-Murray.

The studio's first game Mortal Shell (2020) was nominated for Best Debut Game at The Game Awards 2020, and received generally positive reviews on Metacritic.

== Public acclaim ==
- In August 2014, Dmitry Parkin participated in the exhibition Salon Méditerranéen (Le Grau-du-Roi, France).
- In October 2014, his works were exhibited at the Louvre during the Art shopping exhibition.
- Published in the catalog of the 100 best 3D artists in the world and the reference book "ARTFABETIC" — аrtists and sculptors of France of the 20th century.

== Personal awards ==
- 2008 – Gold medal winner in the "3D" category of international game art contest Dominance War III.
