= Charles Perkins (cricketer) =

English cricketer

Personal information
- Full name: Charles Meigh Perkins
- Born: 10 May 1854; Walsgrave-on-Sowe, Warwickshire, England
- Died: 26 April 1912 (aged 57); Hove, Sussex, England
- Batting: Right-handed

Domestic team information
- Years: Team
- 1884: Sussex

Career statistics
Competition	First-class
Matches	1
Runs scored	12
Batting average	12.00
100s/50s	–/–
Top score	11
Balls bowled	–
Wickets	–
Bowling average	–
5 wickets in innings	–
10 wickets in match	–
Best bowling	–
Catches/stumpings	–/–
- Source: Cricinfo, 20 June 2012

Charles Meigh Perkins (10 May 1854 – 26 April 1912) was an English cricketer. Perkins was a right-handed batsman. He was born at Sowe, Warwickshire.

Perkins made a single first-class appearance for Sussex in 1884 against Nottinghamshire at Trent Bridge. Nottinghamshire won the toss and elected to bat first, making 271 all out. Sussex were then dismissed for just 76 in their first-innings, with Perkins scoring 11 runs before he was dismissed by Alfred Shaw. Forced to follow-on against one of the strongest bowling attacks of the day, Sussex were dismissed for just 44, with Perkins ending the innings not out on a single run. Nottinghamshire won the match by an innings and 151 runs. This was his only major appearance for Sussex.

He died at Hove, Sussex, on 26 April 1912.
