= Jack Perkins (Australian footballer) =

Australian rules footballer (1903–1955)

Personal information
- Full name: John Thomas Perkins
- Born: 20 January 1903; Chiltern Valley, Victoria
- Died: 12 May 1955 (aged 52); Royal Melbourne Hospital, Parkville, Victoria
- Original team: Port Melbourne
- Height: 179 cm (5 ft 10 in)
- Weight: 88 kg (194 lb)

Playing career^{1}
| Years | Club | Games (Goals) |
| 1923–1924 | Port Melbourne (VFA) | 3 (0) |
| 1925–1933 | Northcote (VFA) | 111 (12) |
| 1934–1936 | St Kilda | 39 (14) |
- ^{1} Playing statistics correct to the end of 1936.

John Thomas Perkins (20 January 1903 – 12 May 1955) was an Australian rules footballer who played with St Kilda in the Victorian Football League (VFL).

== Family ==
The son of David Perkins (1871–1939), and Julia Perkins (1876–1957), née Looney, John Thomas Perkins was born at Chiltern Valley, Victoria on 20 January 1903.

He married Ivy Best (1903–1977) in 1929.

== Football ==
=== Port Melbourne (VFA) ===
He played several games for Port Melbourne, before transferring to Northcote.

=== Northcote (VFA) ===
Perkins, a centre half-back, spent most of his career at Northcote, in the Victorian Football Association (VFA).

==== VFA Tribunal ====
He was de-registered by the VFA in 1933 following incidents in the first round of the VFA season. He had already been given lengthy suspension on three previous occasions for on-field violence: "for four weeks in 1925, for 11 weeks in 1929, and for almost the entire season in 1931".

Despite not having been re-registered by the VFA, he made two appearances in 1934 for the Northcote seconds. Following a complaint over his eligibility to play in the seconds, Perkins' case was brought to the Association Permit and Umpire Committee. He was eventually re-registered—and, therefore, allowed to play in the seconds—but, instead, he applied for a transfer to St Kilda.

=== St Kilda (VFL) ===
Already 31 years of age, Perkins made his debut for St Kilda, as a ruckman, in the ninth round of the 1934 VFL season.

He played in a combined Victorian Police Association side, against a combined Western District Football League side, at Hanlon Park on 6 October 1934; and he represented Victoria against Bendigo in 1935.

He was St Kilda's club captain in 1936; however, as a policeman, he was forced to retire after three VFL seasons, following a declaration by the new Police Commissioner, Alexander Duncan, that members of the Victorian police force could not play professional football.

==== VFL Tribunal ====
He was suspended for 4 weeks for striking in September 1934; and was found not guilty of kicking in July 1936.

== Death ==
He died at the Royal Melbourne Hospital, in Parkville, Victoria, on 12 May 1955.
