= George Parkin (cricketer) =

Australian cricketer

Personal information
- Born: 11 October 1864; Adelaide, Australia
- Died: 6 August 1933 (aged 68)
- Source: Cricinfo, 18 September 2020

George Parkin (11 October 1864 – 6 August 1933) was an Australian cricketer. He played in seven first-class matches for South Australia between 1889 and 1894.

== See also ==
- List of South Australian representative cricketers
