= Rodney Perkins =

American physician (born 1936)

Rodney Perkins (born 1936), a physician and entrepreneur, is Professor of Surgery at the Stanford School of Medicine.

== Biography ==
Born in 1936, Perkins grew up in Evansville, Indiana. He attended Indiana University, initially enrolling as a dental student, but changed in his first year to pre-med, and then continued his studies at Indiana University School of Medicine. In his fourth year, as he was learning surgical procedures, he designed a medical device that cooled the blood prior to cardiac surgery that won first place in the AMA’s Medical Student Research Competition. He graduated in 1961. He works as a Neuro-Otologist in Woodside, California.

== Academic career ==
Perkins moved to San Francisco in 1962 and one year later entered a surgical residency at Stanford University. In 1968 he started his own practice adjacent to the Stanford campus. This ultimately became the California Ear Institute at Stanford. Perkins’ long tenure at Stanford was also celebrated with the dedication of the Rodney Perkins Microsurgery Laboratory in 2008.

== Business activities ==
Perkins’ research and career as an entrepreneur has mainly focused on the field of otology. He is the founder of the California Ear Institute at Stanford and a founder or cofounder of Soundhawk, Collagen Corporation, Laserscope, ReSound, Novacept, Pulmonx, Sound ID, EarLens, and DFine Inc. Three of these companies have been taken public.

Perkins is the founder of three public companies: Collagen Corporation (collagen-based implant materials), Laserscope (surgical lasers), and ReSound Corporation (high tech signal processing hearing devices). He is also the founder and Chairman of Novacept (women's health), sold to Cytyc Corporation, Sound ID (hearing science), Pulmonx (interventional pulmonology and emphysema treatment), and was Chairman of Surgrx (electrosurgical instrumentation), which was sold to Ethicon Endo-Surgery, a division of Johnson & Johnson, in 2008.

Currently, Perkins is founder, Director and CMO of Earlens Corporation, which is developing what it hopes will be a new method of sound transduction for hearing improvement. Perkins is co-founder and Chairman of Procept, a company developing a biorobotic minimally invasive solution for benign prostatic hyperplasia.

== Recognition ==
Perkins received the Lifetime Achievement Award from Medical Futures, a British organization that fosters innovation in medicine. He also received the Distinguished Medical Alumnus Award from Indiana University and was inducted into the Evansville Hall of Fame.
