= A. E. Perkins =

American principal and author

Professor Archie Ebenezer Perkins
- Born: June 21, 1879
- Education: Alcorn University
- Website: April 19, 1946 (aged 66)

Archie Ebenezer Perkins (June 21, 1879 – April 19, 1946) was an African American teacher, principal, and author in Mississippi and Louisiana who wrote about subjects related to Black people in the United States. He wrote for periodicals and had several books published.

Perkins was born and raised in Smithdale, Mississippi. He graduated from Alcorn University (now Alcorn State University) near Lorman, Mississippi; he received a Master's degree from New Orleans University; and an LLD degree from Wilberforce University in Ohio. He was principal of the Danneel Negro School. He arranged for musical performances at Danneel Elementary.

== Legacy ==
In 1953, Perkins Primary School, a newly constructed school for African Americans in Biloxi, Mississippi, was named after him.

== Writings ==
- Negro Spirituals from the Far South (1922)
- A Resumé of Negro Congressmen's Office-Holding
- Who's Who in Colored Louisiana (1930), editor
- Riddles from Negro School-children in New Orleans, LA (1932)
- Genealogy of the Perkins Family (1944)
