= Tommy Parkin (footballer, born 1902) =

English footballer

Personal information
- Full name: Thomas Parkin
- Date of birth: 5 February 1902
- Place of birth: Byker, England
- Date of death: 1984 (aged 81–82)
- Position: Winger

Senior career*
Years	Team	Apps	(Gls)
1921–1922	North Shields		
1922–1923	Wallsend		
1923–1924	Preston Colliery		
1924–1925	Coventry City	20	(2)
1925–1926	Durham City	20	(4)
1926–1928	Exeter City	8	(1)
1928–1929	Merthyr Town	23	(1)
1929–1936	Yeovil & Petters United		
1936	Weymouth		
Total		71	(8)
- * Club domestic league appearances and goals

Thomas Parkin (5 February 1902 – 1984) was an English footballer who played in the Football League for Coventry City, Durham City, Exeter City and Merthyr Town.
