= George Henry Perkins =

American entomologist (1844–1933)

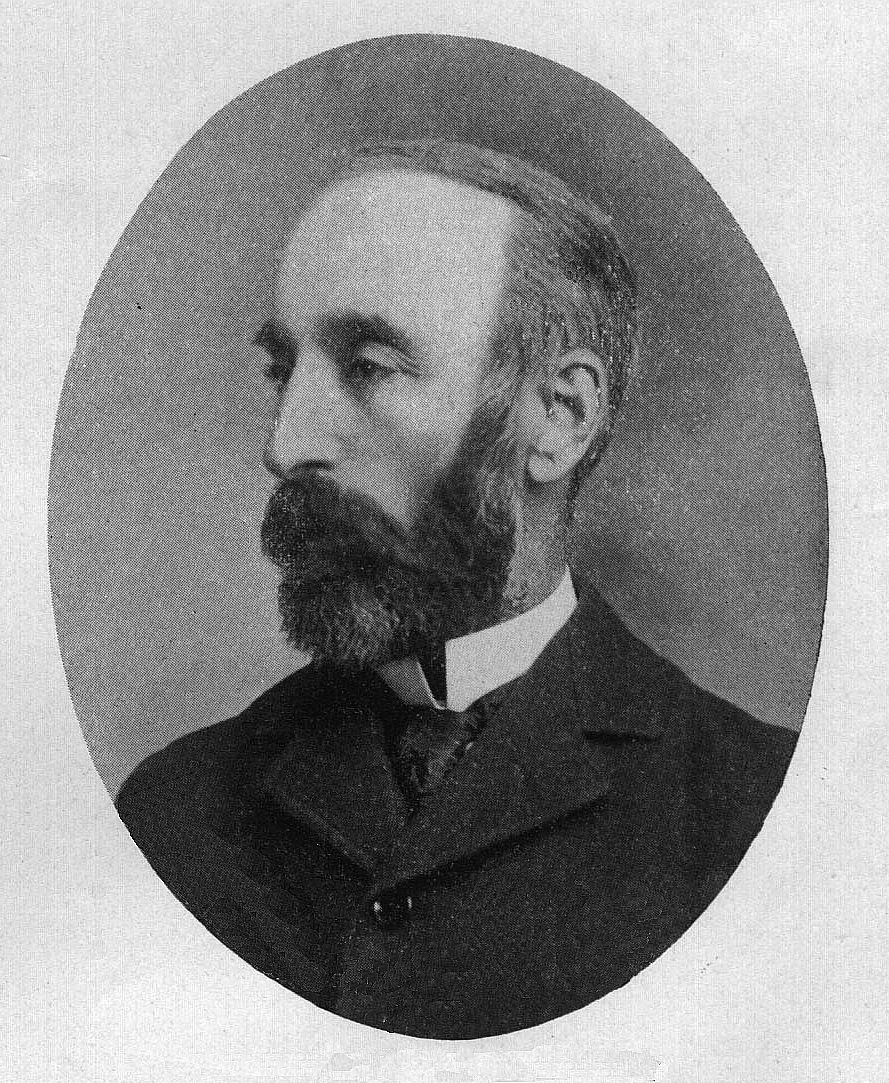
George Henry Perkins

George Henry Perkins (25 September 1844, East Cambridge, Massachusetts - 12 September 1933) was an American naturalist. He was the state entomologist and geologist for Vermont.

== Biography ==
He was educated at the Knox Academy, Galesburg, Illinois, and at Yale, where he graduated in 1867, and in 1869 received the degree of Ph.D. there for postgraduate studies. In 1869 he was appointed as professor of natural history in the University of Vermont, and in 1898 he became dean of the natural science department. Beginning in 1880, he held the office of state entomologist of Vermont. In 1895, he left that post to become the state geologist. He devoted considerable study to the archaeology of the Champlain Valley, concerning which he wrote numerous articles for periodicals and the transactions of scientific societies of which he was a member. He has also lectured on natural history with success in various places.

== Writings ==
Besides technical papers in scientific journals, he has published, under the authority of the state of Vermont:

- On the Injurious Insects of Vermont (3 vols., 1876–78)
- More Important Parasites infesting Man and the Lower Animals (1880)
- The Flora of Vermont (1882)
- The Marble, Slate, and Granite Industries of Vermont (1898)

== See also ==
- Henry Farnham Perkins, his son, American zoologist and eugenicist
