= Henry Farnham Perkins =

American zoologist and eugenicist (1877–1956)

Henry Farnham Perkins (1877–1956) was an American zoologist and eugenicist. He worked as a professor of zoology at the University of Vermont from 1903 to 1945.

== Biography ==
=== Early life and ancestry ===
He was born at 205 South Prospect Street in Burlington, Chittenden County, Vermont, in the house where he spent his entire life in the affluent "Burlington Hill" neighborhood next to the University of Vermont on May 10, 1877. He was born into a family with Midwestern roots that trace back to Mayflower passengers, Love Brewster, a founder of the town of Bridgewater, Massachusetts; Elder William Brewster, the Pilgrim colonist leader and spiritual elder of the Plymouth Colony; and William Bradford, Governor of the Plymouth Colony and the second signer and primary architect of the Mayflower Compact in Provincetown Harbor. He was also a descendant of Martha Wadsworth Brewster, a notable 18th-century American poet and writer.

He was the only son and the second child of George Henry Perkins and the grandson of Frederick Perkins and Harriet Olmstead. Henry's father was a noted American educator, naturalist and Professor of Geology and kindred sciences at the University of Vermont. His father served as Dean of Arts and Sciences, vice president and was appointed interim president of the University of Vermont during World War I. He was also the state geologist of Vermont from 1898 to 1933. He graduated Phi Beta Kappa from Yale University, class of 1867; received the degree of Doctor of Philosophy from Yale in 1869.

His mother was Mary Judd Farnham, an 1863 graduate of Knox College, and a daughter of Eli Farnham and Jerusha Brewster Loomis. She attended the debates between Abraham Lincoln and Stephen A. Douglas at Knox College on October 7, 1858. It was said of her that she was a woman of superior mental endowments. She was the president of the Vermont Chapter of the Woman's Christian Temperance Union, and was active in her church and philanthropic work. Her first cousin was Dr. George Trumbull Ladd an American philosopher, educator and psychologist.

Mary's parents had emigrated to Illinois in 1836 and were among the founders and pioneers of Galesburg, Illinois. They built a temporary cabin in Log City near current Lake Storey, just north of Galesburg, the settlers having decided that no log cabins were to be built inside the town limits. They were also instrumental in the founding of Knox College. Eli Farnham served as secretary of the Board of Trustees for nearly forty years and also the first school teacher in Galesburg.

=== Education ===
He graduated Phi Beta Kappa from the University of Vermont, Burlington in 1898, received his M.Sc in 1899 and was awarded his PhD in Zoology at Johns Hopkins University in 1902. The title of his doctoral thesis was The Development of Gonionema Murbachii, which was on the development and life cycle of Gonionema murbachii (a type of jellyfish). After receiving his doctorate, he joined the faculty of UVM where he remained until his retirement.

=== Marriage and family ===
He married on June 11, 1903, at Baltimore, Baltimore County, Maryland, Mary Edmunds, born at Baltimore, Maryland on October 18, 1874, the daughter of James Richard Edmunds and Anna Smith Keyser. She was the sister of Dr. Charles Keyser Edmunds, one of his fellow graduate students at Johns Hopkins. He was president of Canton Christian College in Canton, Kwangtung Province, China and the fifth president of Pomona College in Claremont, California. Another brother was James Richard Edmunds Jr., a graduate of the University of Pennsylvania, and a notable Architect in Baltimore, Maryland.

She was a descendant of John Howland, who was one of the Pilgrims who travelled from England to North America on the Mayflower, signed the Mayflower Compact, and helped found Plymouth Colony.

Henry and Mary were the parents of two children, Anna Keyser Perkins-Middlebrook, who married as her second husband, Stanwood Wollaston and Harriet Perkins.

=== Career ===
In 1903, he was appointed associate professor of Zoology at University of Vermont, Burlington. He taught biology, entomology, anatomy and physiology, and embryology during the first half of his career. In 1911 was promoted to full professor and served as chairman of the Zoology Department. His sporadic research projects involved field studies in the rapidly fading naturalist tradition: studies of birds, game fish, and marine invertebrates. He retired in 1945 and remained active in the UVM Alumni Association until his death in 1956.

His interest in eugenics began shortly after the end of World War I. It was after World War I that he learned of a study by the U.S. Army which was used as part of the draft process. The results from the Army study showed that men from Vermont had an inordinately high rate of "defects" (such as diabetes, epilepsy, "deformities" and "mental deficiency"). Perkins saw this as a problem that needed to be fixed. He went about trying to "fix" this through investigation and social reform. This reform, as denounced by historian Nancy Gallagher in her research titled Breeding better Vermonters, also targeted French Canadians and American natives in Vermont state, considered insane invasion to eliminate.

Around the same time, he revamped his Zoology curriculum and began teaching courses specifically on Heredity and Evolution. His heredity class provided the first known venue for eugenics education at UVM and the inspiration for a "Eugenics Survey"—a field station to study Vermonters.

=== Death ===
He died on November 24, 1956, in Burlington, Vermont.
