= Frank Perkins =

Frank Perkins may refer to:

- Frank Perkins (engineer) (1889–1967), British engineer, businessman and founder of Perkins Engines Company Limited
- Frank Perkins (composer) (1908–1988), American song composer
