= Hugh V. Perkins =

American educator (1918–1988)

Hugh V. Perkins, Jr.
- Born: June 9, 1918; Toledo, Ohio
- Died: February 10, 1988 (aged 69); Madras, India
- Citizenship: American
- Education: Oberlin College, Oberlin Conservatory of Music, University of Chicago, New York University
- Known for: Human development and learning textbooks and training of educators and parents throughout the U.S. and Pakistan
- Spouse: Cynthia Demaree Perkins
- Scientific career
- Fields: Education; Educational psychology Developmental psychology
- Workplaces: University of Maryland
- Doctoral advisor: Herbert A. Thelen, Howard A. Lane
- Other academic advisors: Ralph Tyler, Ben Bloom, Louise Antz, Mary L. Beauchamp

Hugh Victor Perkins Jr. (June 9, 1918 – February 10, 1988) was an American educator, author, and emeritus professor of education at the Department of Human Development, University of Maryland - College Park. His influence on developmental psychology, teaching, learning, and education from the late 1940s into the 1980s is based on his textbooks and other scholarly publications (see below), his over 35 years of teaching and graduate mentoring, and his many teacher and principal trainings as an early Fulbright Fellow and lecturer in Pakistan in 1958–1959, and later throughout the United States.

== Early life and education ==
Perkins was born in Toledo, Ohio, and raised in Cleveland Heights, Ohio. His mother was Frances Adams Perkins and his father, Hugh V. Perkins Sr., was a vice principal at Cleveland Heights High School and received his Ph.D. in education from Western Reserve University. Hugh V. Jr. ("Vic") graduated Oberlin College with a B.A. and Bachelor of School Music in 1941. After serving in the Seventh U.S. Army in World War II, Perkins received an M.A. in counseling and guidance (1946) and a Ph.D. in educational psychology with a doctoral dissertation on The effects of social-emotional climate and curriculum on group learning of in-service teachers (1949) in the Committee on Human Development at the University of Chicago. Perkins studied with Carl Rogers, Lee Cronbach, and other noted psychologists at Chicago. He was also mentored by Daniel Prescott, who had worked with Jean Piaget and with whom Perkins moved, along with the Institute for Child Study, to Maryland. In 1957, Perkins received an Ed.D. in early childhood and elementary education from New York University with a dissertation entitled A study of selected factors influencing perceptions of and changes in children's self-concepts. In retirement, Perkins earned a master's degree in public affairs and had completed all but his dissertation toward a third doctorate, the last one in national security studies from the University of Maryland, when he died in Madras, India, in 1988.

== Career ==
In 1958–1959, Perkins received a Fulbright Fellowship to give workshops and lectures all over Pakistan. His child development course in Karachi is considered the first of its kind for educators and parents in Pakistan. Perkins served as deputy director of the Institute for Child Study in the College of Education at the University of Maryland from 1960 to 1981, was acting director from 1976 to 1978, and Chair of the Department of Human Development, 1982–1983. He has been recognized as one of the most important educational thinkers in history.

== Books ==
- Perkins, Hugh V. (1974). Human development and learning (2nd ed.). Belmont, CA: Wadsworth Pub. Co. (1st edition: 1969)
- Perkins, Hugh V. (1975). Human development. Belmont, Calif.: Wadsworth Pub. Co.
- Brandt, Richard Martin, & Perkins, Hugh V. (1956). Research evaluating a child study program (Monographs of the Society for Research in Child Development, Vol. 21, no. 1). Lafayette, IN: Child Development Publications.

== Selected scholarly articles ==
- Perkins, Hugh V. (1950). The effects of climate and curriculum on group learning. Journal of Educational Research, 44(4), 269–286.
- Perkins, Hugh V. (1950). Teachers grow in understanding children. Educational Leadership, 7(5), 549–555.
- Perkins, Hugh V. (1951). Climate influences group learning. Journal of Educational Research, 45, 115–119.
- Perkins, Hugh V. (1955). Developmental tasks and the study of science. Educational Leadership, 12, 214–217.
- Perkins, Hugh V. (1958). Teachers' and peers' perceptions of children's self-concepts. Child Development, 29(2), 203–220.
- Perkins, Hugh V. (1958). Factors influencing change in children's self-concepts. Child Development, 29(2), 221–230.
- Perkins, Hugh V. (1964). A Procedure for Assessing the Classroom Behavior of Students and Teachers. American Educational Research Journal, 1(4), 249–260.
- Perkins, Hugh V. (1965). Classroom Behavior and Underachievement. American Educational Research Journal, 2(1), 1–12.
- Perkins, Hugh V. (1966). Federal participation and its results. Educational Leadership, 24(1), 39–45.
- Perkins, Hugh V. (1969). Clarifying Feelings Through Peer Interaction. Childhood Education, 45(7), 379–380.
- Perkins, Hugh V., & Robertson-Tchabo, Elizabeth A. (1981). Retirees Return to College: An Evaluative Study at One University Campus. Educational-Gerontology, 6(2), 273–287.
