= Charles L. Perkins =

Charles L. Perkins is the Founder and Chief Scientist of Virtual Rendezvous.

He co-wrote a popular book on Java in October 1995 and created some (now historical) Java class hierarchy diagrams.

An edited except of "The Big Picture" section (thru "The Bytecodes Themselves") of the book was published in the Premiere issue of Java Report, March 1996. He has written several other books, including a number of volumes in the "Teach Yourself Java" series.

== Books written by Perkins ==
1996:

- Teach Yourself Java in 21 Days (ISBN 1-57521-030-4)
- Teach Yourself Java for Macintosh in 21 Days (ISBN 1-56830-280-0)
- Teach Yourself Java in Cafe in 21 Days (ISBN 1-57521-157-2)
- Teach Yourself Sunsoft Java Workshop in 21 Days (ISBN 1-57521-159-9)
- Teach Yourself Java in 21 Days: Professional Reference Edition (ISBN 1-57521-183-1)

1997:

- Teach Yourself Java 1.1 In 21 Days (ISBN 1-57521-142-4) (ISBN 978-1-57521-142-8) (ASIN B000IQZY5M)
- Teach Yourself Java 1.1 for Macintosh in 21 Days (ISBN 1-56830-342-4)

2000: Ad Hoc Networking. Boston, MA: Addison-Wesley, 2000.
