= Copus massacre =

Massacre during the war of 1812

Copus Massacre
- Part of the War of 1812
Date	September 15, 1812
Location	Ashland County, Ohio
Result	American victory

Belligerents
Lenape people; Wyandot people; Mohawk people	United States

Commanders and leaders
	(United States)

Strength
Lenape people; Wyandot people; Mohawk people	Ohio Militia and settlers

Casualties and losses
2–11 killed	4 killed 3 wounded

The Copus massacre is a name given to a skirmish occurring on September 15, 1812, between American settlers and Lenape, Wyandot, and Mohawk Native Americans on the Ohio frontier during the War of 1812.

The massacre resulted from a misunderstanding between Reverend James Copus and the members of the Native American tribes. Copus was instructed to persuade the tribes to relocate to the Piqua Reservation before the United States would force them to do so.

However, even after reaching an agreement with the tribes, American soldiers razed the tribe's homes, burning the entire village to the ground. Assuming Copus's betrayal, the Native Americans then retaliated. The massacre is named for Reverend James Copus, who died during an attack on his house.

In addition to Reverend Copus, 3 American soldiers died in the conflict; 2 to 11 Lenape, Wyandot, and Mohawk people died. The American settlers were defending Charles Mill Lake, Ohio while the displaced Lenape, Wyandot, and Mohawk people were most likely retaliating against multiple forced displacements and the Americans' destruction of their homes.

== Background ==
In the 18th century, European colonists arrived in what is today Pennsylvania and New York - i.e., the land of the Lenape, Wyandots, and Mohawks. Colonist organizations such as the "New Jersey Association for Helping the Indians" forcefully expelled tribes westward via forced migration, creating Wyandot, Mohawk, and Lenape settlements in states including Ohio. However, some Lenape and Wyandots were indigenous to Ohio.

The War of 1812 led to an increase in tension between Native Americans and the increasing number of settlers. The military feared that the British Army would recruit the Native Americans as allies. Colonel Samuel Kratzer received orders to remove the Native Americans, who were mostly from the Delaware tribe, to the Piqua Reservation as a precautionary measure, and he assigned Captain Douglas to the task.

Local reverend James Copus was originally from Greene County, Pennsylvania and moved into the valley of the Black Fork in 1809 with his wife and seven children (his name is listed in the 1811 tax records of the area). He was a trusted friend of the Native Americans and had settled several miles from Greentown. Thus, when the Delaware told Captain Douglas that they would not leave, he tried to convince Copus to persuade the Native Americans. At first, Copus refused to interfere against them and said that he would personally stand accountable for their conduct. Douglas told Copus that they were under orders and that if the Native Americans did not comply, there would be bloodshed. Copus then agreed to accompany the soldiers to Greentown and speak with the Native Americans, but not before being assured that their lives and property would be protected if they agreed to surrender. Copus reluctantly met with the council of elders and, after much persuasion and reassurance, the elders agreed to leave their village.

After the soldiers led the Greentown Natives on their march, several soldiers straggled behind, ransacked the village, and burned it to the ground. Seeing the smoke from their burning homes, the Native Americans felt that they had been double-crossed by Copus.

Following the deaths of some of his neighbors, including the Zimmer family, at the hands of Native Americans, Copus asked for protection and was moved with his family to a blockhouse. After several days, Copus decided that there was no longer any danger, so on September 14, 1812, nine militia soldiers (Captain Absalom Martin's Company of Guernsey County, Ohio) were detailed to accompany him and his family to their home. Upon his return, he found that nothing had been disturbed, and Copus felt somewhat at ease. Later that afternoon, one of Copus' daughters Nancy Copus noticed a Native American at the edge of the woods but did not report the sighting.

== Attack at the Copus homestead ==
The following day, seven of the soldiers left to wash at a nearby spring, leaving their weapons near the house. The Native Americans attacked the men at the spring. Three fled to the woods. They were pursued by the Native Americans and two of them, Private George Shipley and Private John Tedrick, were tomahawked. The third man, Private Robert Warnock, was shot and mortally wounded.

The only soldier who regained the cabin was George Dye, who fought alongside John Shambaugh a neighbor to the Copus family. George Dye was wounded in the thigh by a musketball. As he came through the door, Copus was hit by a shot through his chest.

On the east of the cabin, there was a range of hills several hundred feet high covered with timber and large rocks, which afforded an excellent cover for the enemy and gave them a position from which they could fire down upon the cabin. The Native Americans besieged the cabin from the hill. The soldiers tore up the planks of the floor and placed them against the door to prevent the balls from penetrating to the interior of the cabin. Nancy Copus, a young child, was wounded in the knee by a ball that passed through the door. John Shambaugh shot and killed the attacker of Nancy Copus. One of the soldiers, George Launtz, had his arm broken by a ball and, reportedly, killed the attacker who wounded him.

The soldiers fought back from daybreak until midmorning, and as many as eleven Native Americans were killed. The Native Americans then retreated, killing the Copus' sheep on their way. As soon as the Native Americans disappeared, one of the soldiers crawled out through the roof of the cabin and went to the blockhouse for assistance. Captain Martin and his second in command, Sgt. John Bratton (son of pioneer James Bratton, the first settler in Ohio on 1799) had agreed to call at the Copus cabin the previous evening with a number of soldiers and remain all night. But he and his soldiers, having been scouting all day and finding no signs of Native Americans, concluded that there was no real danger. Therefore, they camped on the Black Fork and reached the Copus' cabin late on the morning of the attack. He and his soldiers attended to the wounded, and a search was made for the Native Americans but they were not found.

Copus and the dead soldiers, Shipley, Tedrick, and Warnock, were buried near the cabin. On the 70th anniversary of the battle, a monument was put up at the site of the killings by the Ashland County Pioneer Society. The unveiling of the monument, on September 15, 1882, was attended by 10,000 people including Copus daughter, Sarah Vail. A second monument was erected nearby to commemorate the victims of the Zimmer massacre.

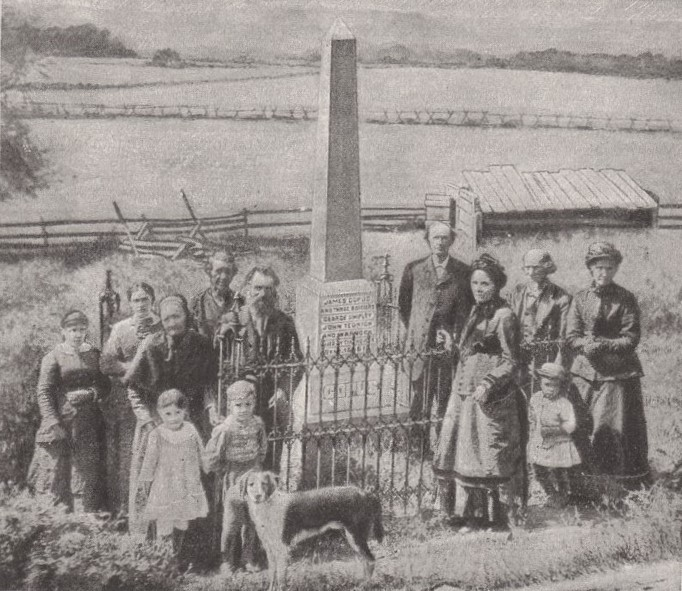
The Copus monument in Perrysville, Ohio was unveiled on September 15, 1882. 6,000 persons attended the memorial event; some of the attendees are pictured. (Either an early photograph or near-photorealistic drawing)

== Legacy ==
On September 15, 1882, a group of Perrysville, Ohio residents unveiled the Copus Monument, a mass grave monument in memory of the white soldiers. 6,000 persons attended the event. In 1902, Ohio genealogist Henry Howe described the 1882 event:

Early in the day the people began to arrive at the Copus Hill from every direction; a-foot, on horseback and in every imaginable kind of conveyance, until fully 6,000 had assembled in the forest overlooking the scene of the Copus battle. The day was balmy—one of those pleasant fall days—and the thousands present came with baskets filled ready for the pic-nic. The exercises opened with music by the Mt. Zion band, followed by prayer by Rev. J. A. HAIL, then music, then the address of welcome by the gentleman above named. ... Mrs. Sarah VAIL, daughter of James COPUS, who was present at the time her father and the three soldiers were killed, and who now resides hard by at the age of eighty-four years, was introduced to the multitude. ... at its close a procession of vehicles to the number of about 1,200 was formed and passed by the Copus Monument as it was unveiled. The multitude then proceeded to the Ruffner Monument, when it was also unveiled. Thus the ceremonies of the day ended; a day long to be remembered.

Per the suggestion of local author and poet Rosella Rice, a cenotaph to John "Johnny Appleseed" Chapman was prominently added to the monument. Despite this, Chapman was not involved in the conflict. Rice is perhaps best known for her prose and poetry describing Chapman; her widely published works contributed to Chapman becoming a mythologized hero of American folklore.
