= Charles Mill Lake =

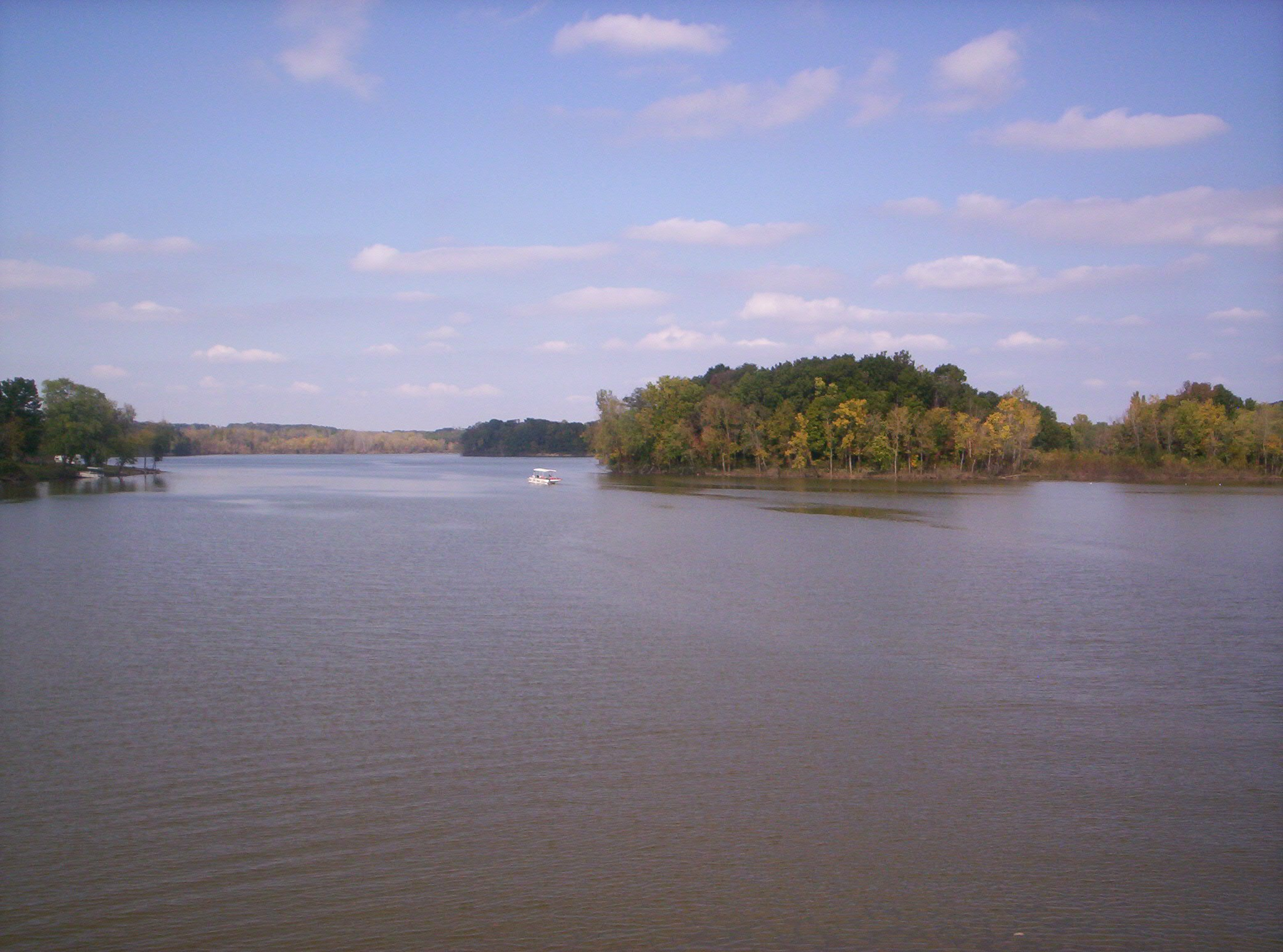
- View from the Ohio 430 bridge in Ashland County, Ohio looking north

- Location within Ohio Location within the United States
- Location: Ashland / Richland counties, Ohio, U.S.
- Coordinates: 40°45′49.6″N 82°22′26.4″W
- Type: reservoir
- Primary inflows: Black Fork of the Mohican River
- Primary outflows: Black Fork of the Mohican River
- Catchment area: 215 sq mi (560 km^{2})
- Basin countries: United States
- Max. length: 5.2 mi (8.4 km) to 19.8 mi (31.9 km)
- Surface area: 1,350 acres (5.5 km^{2}) to 6,050 acres (24.5 km^{2})
- Surface elevation: 1,093 ft (333 m)

Charles Mill is a reservoir located in central Ohio near the junction of State Routes 430 and 603. Charles Mill Lake is a quiet and enjoyable place for boating, camping, fishing, hunting, or hiking. The lake is located in both Richland County (near Mansfield) and Ashland County (near Mifflin), with the dam located in Ashland County. This lake is located on the Black Fork of the Mohican River. Many local residents refer to Chales Mill Lake as Mifflin Lake due to its proximity to Mifflin, Ohio. The lake primarily sees local use by nearby residents who fish or boat; the marina is accessible from St. Rt. 430.

== History ==
The area around the lake experienced several incidents of violence between settlers and Native Americans during the War of 1812. An attack took place within a mile of the dam site following the forced removal of the Piqua Indians from their homes in Greentown. The Native Americans first attacked the home of the Frederick Zimmer family, killing Zimmer, his wife and daughter, and their neighbor, Martin Ruffner. Several days later, a settler, James Copus, and three militiamen were killed while defending Copus' home and family. There is a historical marker in the day use area of the lake that recounts the stories of "Frontier Violence During the War of 1812" and "English-Allied Indian Attacks", and a monument honoring these events was erected on Route 603, near the dam. The name for Charles Mill Lake comes from the name of J. Charles who operated a sawmill (S.M.) in the vicinity where the park below the dam is situated currently. Caldwell's Atlas of Ashland County - 1874

== Watershed ==
=== Charles Mill Dam ===
Charles Mill Dam is located on the Black Fork of the Mohican River, 10 miles (16 km) east of Mansfield, Ohio and 10 miles (16 km) southwest of Ashland, Ohio. The lake is located in Ashland County and Richland County, with the dam being located in Ashland County. Charles Mill Dam was constructed from 1935 to 1936 and is primarily for flood control, but is also used for recreation, and fish and wildlife management.

Charles Mill Dam is a rolled earth fill dam with an impervious, water-resistant, clay core. The dam, is 48 feet (15 m) high, 1,390 feet (420 m) long and 20 feet (6.1 m) wide. The flood reduction system also includes two dikes and one levee. These structures, the dam, dikes and levee, hold the water that may build up behind them from the 215 square miles (560 km^{2}) drainage area the dam serves. The dam also has two spillways to handle water above the maximum the dam is designed to hold; one is built into the gate house, the other is beyond the gate house against the right abutment. There are five gates which allow the water to pass through the dam and provide control of it. During the summer months the lake is kept at about 31 feet (9.4 m) at the dam which provides 1,350 acres (5.5 km^{2}) of water surface. At that level the water is backed up the Black Fork about 5.2 miles (8.4 km). When the dam is holding the maximum flood water it is designed to hold there would be 6,050 acres (24.5 km^{2}) surface acres of water behind the dam and water would be backed up the Black Fork 19.8 miles (31.9 km).
