= Lenape settlements =

Lenape settlements are villages and other sites founded by Lenape people, a Native American tribe from the Northeastern Woodlands. Many of these sites are located in New York, New Jersey, Pennsylvania, and Ohio.

== Hell Town ==
Hell Town, Ohio is a village located on Clear Creek, known today as Clear Fork, near the abandoned town of Newville, Ohio. The site is on a high hill just north of the junction of Clear Creek and the Black Fork of the Mohican River. The reference to the village sitting on a "high hill" counters many popular misconceptions that the village was in low-lying areas that would later be submerged by the damming of the Clear Fork River to create Pleasant Hill Lake. Hell Town was located along a "war trail" used by Native Americans in the region, which ran from a point about 30 miles (48 km) south from Sandusky, Ohio, thence north-northeast into the Cuyahoga River valley. This trail was later used by white settlers and is today known as State Route 95. Rerouted in the 1940s, a portion of this old road and war path are buried under Pleasant Hill Lake.

Helltown (actually meaning "town of the clear water") was situated a mile below Newville, on the Clear Fork of the Mohican, in what is known as the Darling settlement. In 1783, in the wake of the Gnadenhutten Massacre, Helltown was abandoned, and a new settlement (Greentown) was established on the Black Fork, where a better location for defence was secured.

== Jerometown ==
A village of the Lenape which (sometime prior to the year 1808, and probably after 1790) was located on the south (and western) side of the present-day Jerome Fork of the Mohican River. It was named for Jean Baptiste Jerome, a French-Canadian fur-trader (who never actually lived directly within the native village); however, it should perhaps have been more appropriately named "(Chief, or Captain) Pipe's town", after Captain Pipe, (c. 1725 – c. 1818) also known as Hopocan. According to the local histories, by 1808-09 early European-American settlers to the area of what is now Jeromesville in Ashland County, Ohio, on the Jerome Fork of the Mohican River found Lenape people living about three-fourths of a mile south-by-south-west of the present site of Jeromesville. Near that native village of "Jerometown" was the cabin of "Old Captain Pipe", who, with small remnants of a Lenape tribe, were still living near that village site until 1812.

== Mohican John's Town ==
Mohican John's town (or "Johnstown") was said, by 19th-century historians, to have been the same as the native-village of "Jerometown", located just south of Jeromesville, Ohio. However, surveys done in the 1760s (etc.), located "Mohican John's town" in the vicinity of present-day Mifflin, Ohio. It is uncertain if the earlier (1760s) "Mohican John's town" Indian village had perhaps been later moved to the alternate location before the 1800s; or if instead, local-historians merely misinterpreted the earlier "John's town" (on the Black Fork of the Mohican) to be the same location as "Jerometown" (on the Jerome Fork of the Mohican). Regardless, the "Mohican John's town" of the 1760s (which was apparently mainly inhabited by members of the "Mingo" tribe), was undoubtedly upon the Black Fork of the Mohican River (and probably near present-day Mifflin, Ohio).

Knapp's History of Ashland County (OH) accurately refers to the native-village near present-day Jeromesville as being named "Jerometown" by 1808. But Knapp's History errs in attributing the original village of "Mohican John's Town" (which was recorded in 1764 to be on the immediate 'east' side of the Black Fork) to be the same native village as Jerometown (which was consistently recorded to be on the near 'western' side of the Jerome Fork). The later historians never noticed Knapp's obvious contradiction, and they simply repeated (and expanded upon) his error.

== Greentown ==
Greentown was located near Perrysville in Ashland County, Ohio. It was established in 1782 after the village of Helltown was abandoned, and was presumably named after Thomas Green, a Loyalist who served in Butler's Rangers and participated in the Battle of Wyoming. By 1812 there were between 150 and 200 families living at Greenstown. After the Siege of Detroit in August 1812, the inhabitants were removed by the Americans due to fears that they would aid the indigenous allies of the British. The village was burned to the ground and remained abandoned after the War of 1812.

== Coshocton ==
Coshocton was settled in 1778, when Lenape leader, Pipe, and the warlike members of his tribe, departed from the Tuscarawas and relocated on the Walhonding River, about fifteen miles above the present site of Coshocton, Ohio.

== Kilbuck ==
Kilbuck is also known as Bucktown. This village seems to have been named in honor of "Chief Killbuck".

== Shamokin ==
Shamokin was established in central Pennsylvania by Lenape who were displaced from their traditional homeland along the Delaware River by growing colonial communities in the early 18th century. The earliest reference to the town is in 1711, when the Shawnee chief Opessa Straight Tail is recorded as marrying Polly, the daughter of Sassoonan. The village was the focus of missionary efforts, and then was the staging area for raids on English settlements in Pennsylvania during the French and Indian War. It was burned and abandoned by the Lenape in May 1756. A few months later, Fort Augusta was constructed on the site of the village.

== Kittanning ==
Kittanning was an 18th-century Lenape village in the Ohio Country, located on the Allegheny River at present-day Kittanning, Pennsylvania. The village was at the western terminus of the Kittanning Path, an Indian trail that provided a route across the Alleghenies between the Ohio and Susquehanna river basins. Kittanning served as a staging area for Lenape and Shawnee raids on English colonial settlements during the French and Indian War, until Pennsylvania militia under the command of Colonel John Armstrong destroyed the village on 8 September 1756.

== Meniolagomeka ==
Meniolagomeka (also Meniolágoméka) was a Moravian Church settlement of German missionaries and Lenape converts on the Aquashicola Creek near Kunkletown in Monroe County, Pennsylvania. It lasted from approximately 1742 to 1754.
