= Zimmer massacre =

Zimmer Massacre
- Part of the War of 1812
Date	September 1812
Location	Ashland County, Ohio
Result	Native American victory

Belligerents
Native Americans	United States

Commanders and leaders
	(United States)

Strength
Native Americans	Ohio settlers

Casualties and losses
	4 killed

The Zimmer massacre was the massacre of four settlers by Native Americans in Mifflin Township, Ashland County, Ohio in September, 1812. Although the exact motive for the attack is unknown, the end result was that four settlers were killed, further increasing the distrust between Native Americans and settlers at the beginning of the War of 1812.

== Background ==
In the early 1800s, tensions between Native Americans and newly arrived white settlers was very high. Forced Indian removal was causing tensions to rise, as Native Americans struggled to find a way to maintain peace with their neighbors who were forcefully removing them from their land of birth. After the Treaty of Greenville in 1795, many tribes felt wronged since they were not included in the negotiations, and tribes were forced off their land having had no input in the treaty, Shawnee chief Tecumseh being a noted critic. The War of 1812 also increased tensions between the two groups. These tensions were heightened by the forced removal of the Native Americans from their homes in Greentown (near Perrysville), and the subsequent burning of the town by soldiers.

=== The Zimmer family ===
Note: In some sources, the name Zimmer is given as Zeimer or Seymour. It is spelled Zimmer on the family gravestone.

The Zimmers were one of the early settler families in Mifflin Township; they are listed in the 1811 tax records, and settled about 5 miles (8.0 km) north of Greentown. At that time, Mifflin Township was part of Richland County, but became part of Ashland County upon its formation in 1846. The family consisted of Frederick Zimmer, his wife, and their children, Philip (17) and Kate.

=== Martin Ruffner ===
Like the Zimmers, Martin Ruffner was one of the early settlers in the area. He came from Shenandoah County, Virginia, and settled about 2.5 miles (4.0 km) from the Zimmers' cabin, accompanied by his mother, brother Michael, and a sister.

== The events of the killing ==
Although accounts differ as to the exact details of the events and the numbers of Native Americans involved, there are common elements to the story. On September 10, 1812, Ruffner's servant (or his brother, Michael) was stopped by a group of four–six Native Americans and asked about the Zimmers. When Ruffner heard about this encounter, he was concerned and went to the Zimmers' cabin, with his gun, to warn them. Ruffner arrived at the same time, or shortly before, the Native Americans and, fearing trouble, sent Philip Zimmer to warn nearby settlers and get assistance. Philip went to the cabins of James Copus and John Lambright, and both men returned with Philip to the Zimmers' cabin.

The men found the cabin dark and the front door open. There was blood inside the open doorway and, fearing that the Native Americans were still inside, they fled to the nearest blockhouse where there were soldiers stationed. A group of soldiers returned to the house and found Ruffner's body in the yard. Inside the house, they found the bodies of the Zimmer family.

The Native Americans involved were thought to be Greentown Native Americans who had been protesting resettlement. It is not known if any of them were murdered in the attack.

The possible motive behind the attacks was thought to be retribution for the forced removal of Native Americans and burning of their town of Greentown.

== Aftermath ==
In 1813, Philip Zimmer sold the family property for $1.50 per acre.

Two monuments were erected, by the Ashland County Pioneer Society, to mark the spots of the Zimmer massacre and the Copus massacre. On September 15, 1882, the dedication for the monuments was attended by 10,000 people, including one of the Copus children who had survived that attack.

In 1858, a fictional account of the massacre was written by Reverend James F. McGaw, titled Philip Seymour, or, Pioneer life in Richland County, Ohio: founded on facts. This book has given rise to several misunderstandings about the events surrounding the massacres, including the role of Johnny Appleseed.

== See also ==
- List of massacres in Ohio
