= Arthur's Lady's Home Magazine =

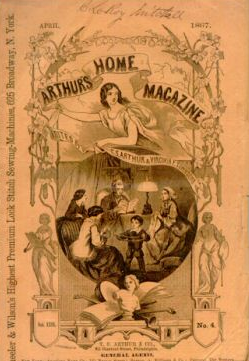
Arthur's Home Magazine, 1867

Arthur's Home Magazine (1852 – c. 1898) or Ladies' Home Magazine was an American periodical published in Philadelphia by Timothy Shay Arthur. Editors Arthur and Virginia Frances Townsend selected writing and illustrations intended to appeal to female readers. Among the contributors were Mary Tyler Peabody Mann, Rosella Rice, and Kate Sutherland.

In its early years, the monthly contained a selection of articles originally published in Arthur's weekly Home Gazette. Its non-fiction stories contained occasional factual inaccuracies for the sake of a good read. A contemporary review judged it "gotten up in good taste and well; and is in nothing overdone. Even its fashion plates are not quite such extravagant caricatures of rag-baby work as are usually met with in some of the more fancy magazines." Readers included patrons of the Mercantile Library Association of San Francisco.

Author Rosella Rice, best known for her writings about Johnny Appleseed, contributed countless stories, humorous essays, tutorials, and poems to the magazine. Writing from the perspective of various comedic characters, she adopted pseudonyms including Pipsissiway Potts (responsible homemaker), Aunt Chatty Brooks (eccentric hotelier), and Mrs. Sam Starkey (elderly busybody). The characters, likely created for Arthur's, "inhabited her magazine's stories, and became 'real' to hundreds of readers".

== Alternate titles ==
- Arthur's Home Magazine
- Arthur's Illustrated Home Magazine
- Arthur's Lady's Home Magazine
- The Home Magazine
- Ladies' Home Magazine
- Lady's Home Magazine
