= Ralph Bingham =

Ralph Bingham (2 August 1870-28 December 1925) was a humorist, entertainer, monologist and violinist. He was born in Richmond, Virginia, the son of Hamilton Bingham and Jane E. (McClintock) Bingham. He went to public school and was also privately tutored, and earned a degree from Villanova College, Pennsylvania in 1906. He married Christina Lorinda Giles of New London, Ohio in October, 1908.

== Career ==
He began his career at the age of 9 as an orator in Richmond, Virginia. Under the management of his father he first toured the United States and Canada. He was a founder and president of the International Lyceum Association America. He was known as America's "Foremost Platform Humorist" and also "The jolliest man in America." He gave about 7,000 performances during his lifetime, was a member of the Redpath Bureau for 15 years, was also a member of the Lamb's Club in New York as well as the Pen and Pencil Club of Philadelphia. His stories were recorded, and he has an extensive discography.

== Death ==
He died suddenly at home in Philadelphia. The cause of death was stated in his obituary as "acute indigestion followed by an attack of heart disease." His death certificate states that he is buried in Hillside Cemetery.
