= Pleasant Hill Lake =

Lake in Ohio

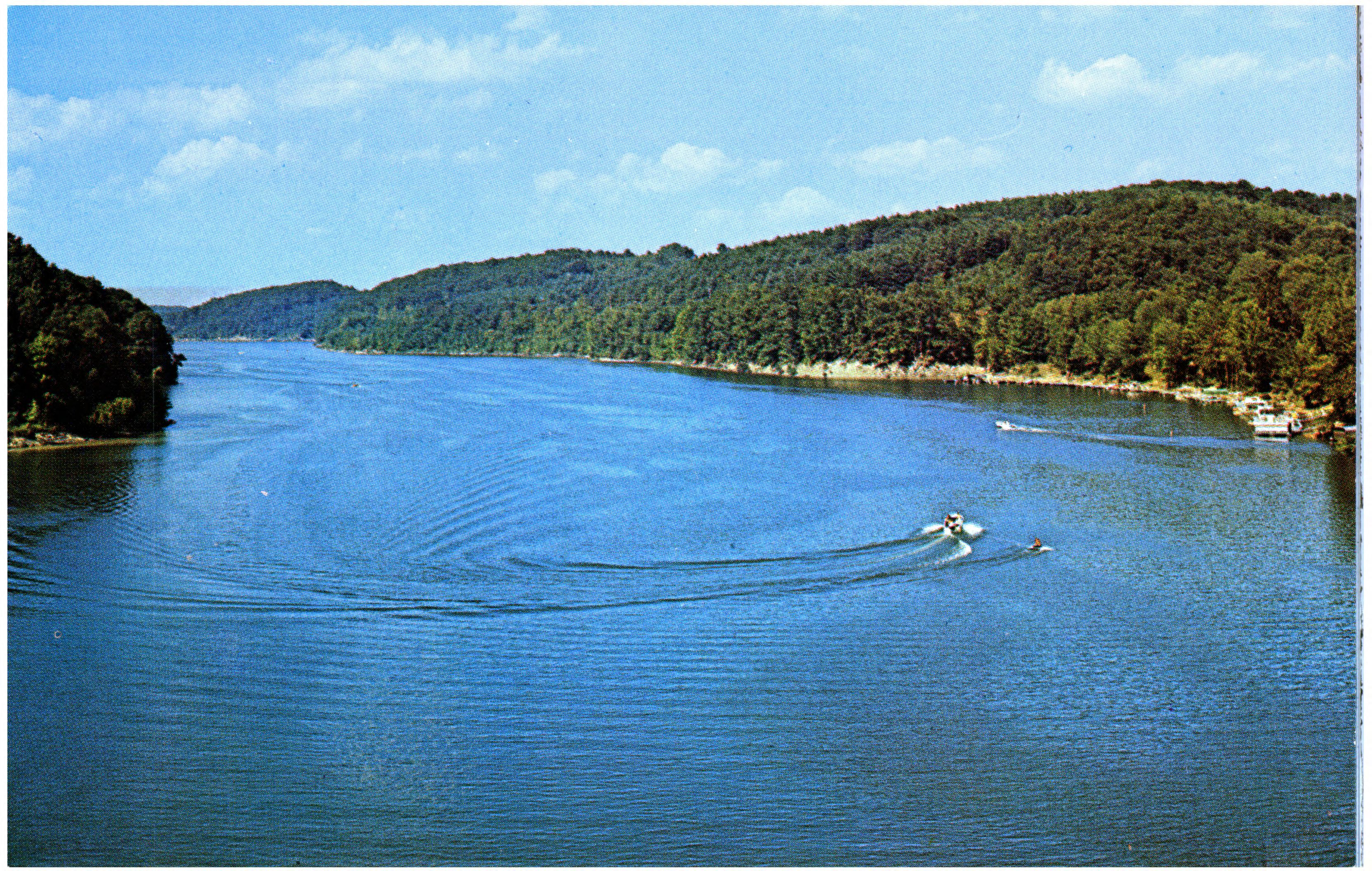

- Location within Ohio Location within the United States
- Location: Perrysville
- Coordinates: 40°38′25″N 82°20′31″W
- Primary inflows: Clear Fork
- Primary outflows: Clear Fork
- Basin countries: United States
- Built: 1936
- Surface area: 783 acres (317 ha)
- Max. depth: 35 ft (11 m)
- Surface elevation: 1,020 ft (310 m)

Pleasant Hill Lake is a 783-acre man made lake located near Perrysville and between Ashland and Richland counties in Ohio. Completed in 1936, Pleasant Hill Dam was built on the Clear Fork of the Mohican River. The dam which forms the lake is a 113 ft (34 m) tall earth-fill dam. It is located in Ashland but the lake extends into Richland. The lake which was constructed by the United States Army Corps of Engineers, was built for the purpose of flood control.
