= Helltown =

Helltown or Hell Town may refer to:

- Helltown, California, U.S.
- Hell Town, Ohio, a Lenape village archaeological site near Newville, Ohio, U.S.
- Hell Town (TV series), a 1985 American drama series
- Born to the West, a 1937 John Wayne film reissued as Hell Town
- Helltown: The Untold Story of a Serial Killer on Cape Cod, a 2022 book by Casey Sherman
