= Bridge of Dreams =

Covered bridge in Ohio

Coordinates: 40°27.90417′N 82°11.63167′W

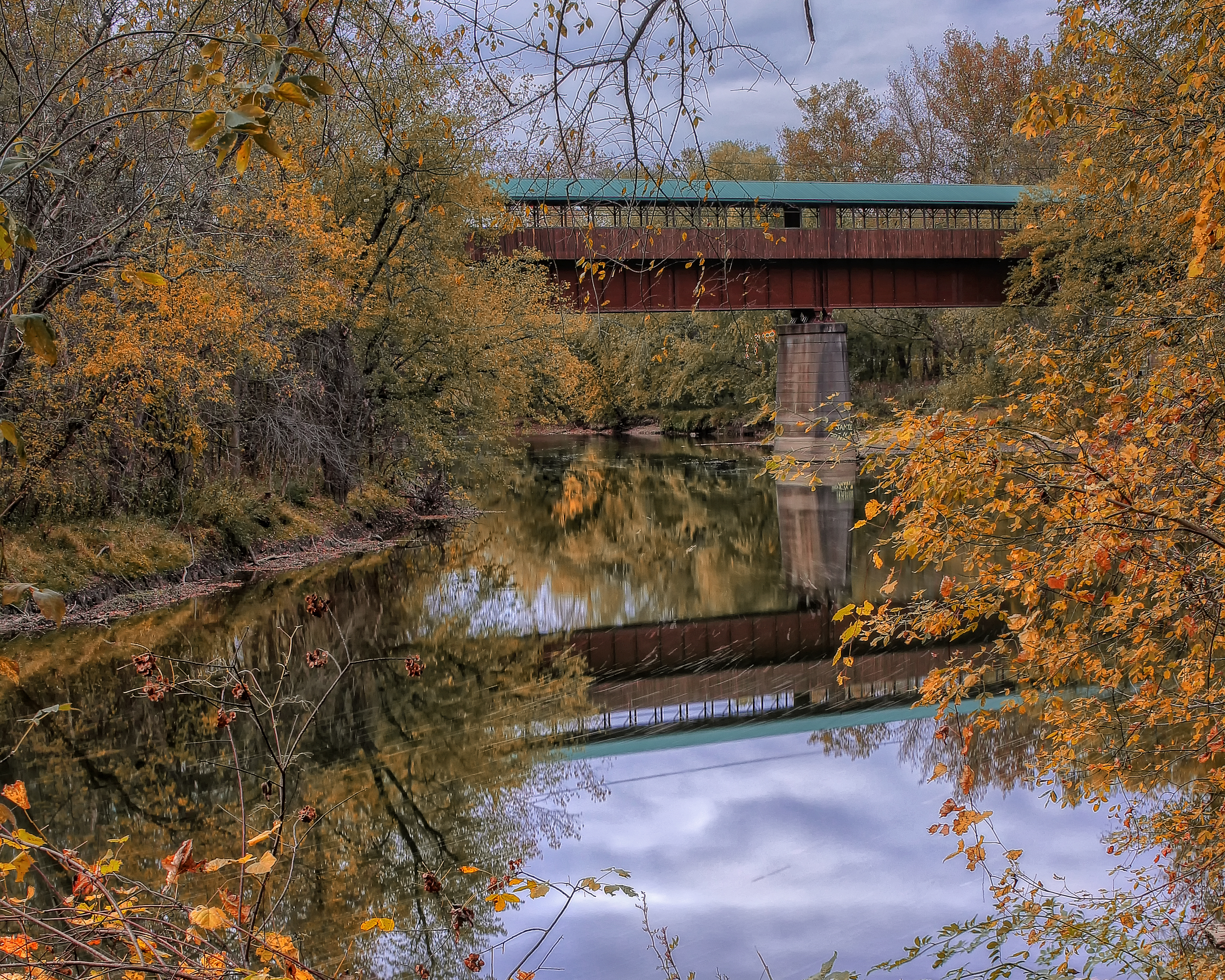

The Bridge of Dreams is a 370-foot covered bridge located near Brinkhaven, Ohio. Originally built in the 1920s as a railroad bridge, and covered in 1998. It is the second longest covered bridge in Ohio after the Smolen–Gulf Bridge, and third longest covered bridge in the United States.

== History ==
The Bridge of Dreams spans the Mohican River in Knox County, Ohio. It is a pedestrian and bicycling bridge and part of the Mohican Valley Trail, a nature trail built on an abandoned railroad bed belonging to the old Pennsylvania Railroad. The bridge is closed to motorized traffic but is often used by Amish buggies.

A railroad bridge at the site, carrying the Pennsylvania Railroad line over the river, was constructed in the 1920s. By the early 1990s, the line had been abandoned and a group of local residents and businesses developed a plan for converting it into a multi-use trail stretching from the Holmes County line near Brinkhaven, to Danville. The most ambitious aspect of the plan was to cover the 370 foot railroad bridge. Skeptics of this expensive plan claimed that its proponents were "dreaming", which led backers to adopt the name "Bridge of Dreams" for the project. Eventually planners were able to raise the almost $90,000 through contributions and a grant from the Ohio Department of Natural Resources. The "Bridge of Dreams" was completed in December 1998 and dedicated in April 1999. The Mohican Valley Trail officially opened on June 15, 2001. Today the trail extends from East Street in Danville to the Holmes County Line, connecting the Kokosing Gap Trail and the Holmes County Trails.
