= Brinkhaven, Ohio =

- Village
- Brinkhaven, Ohio
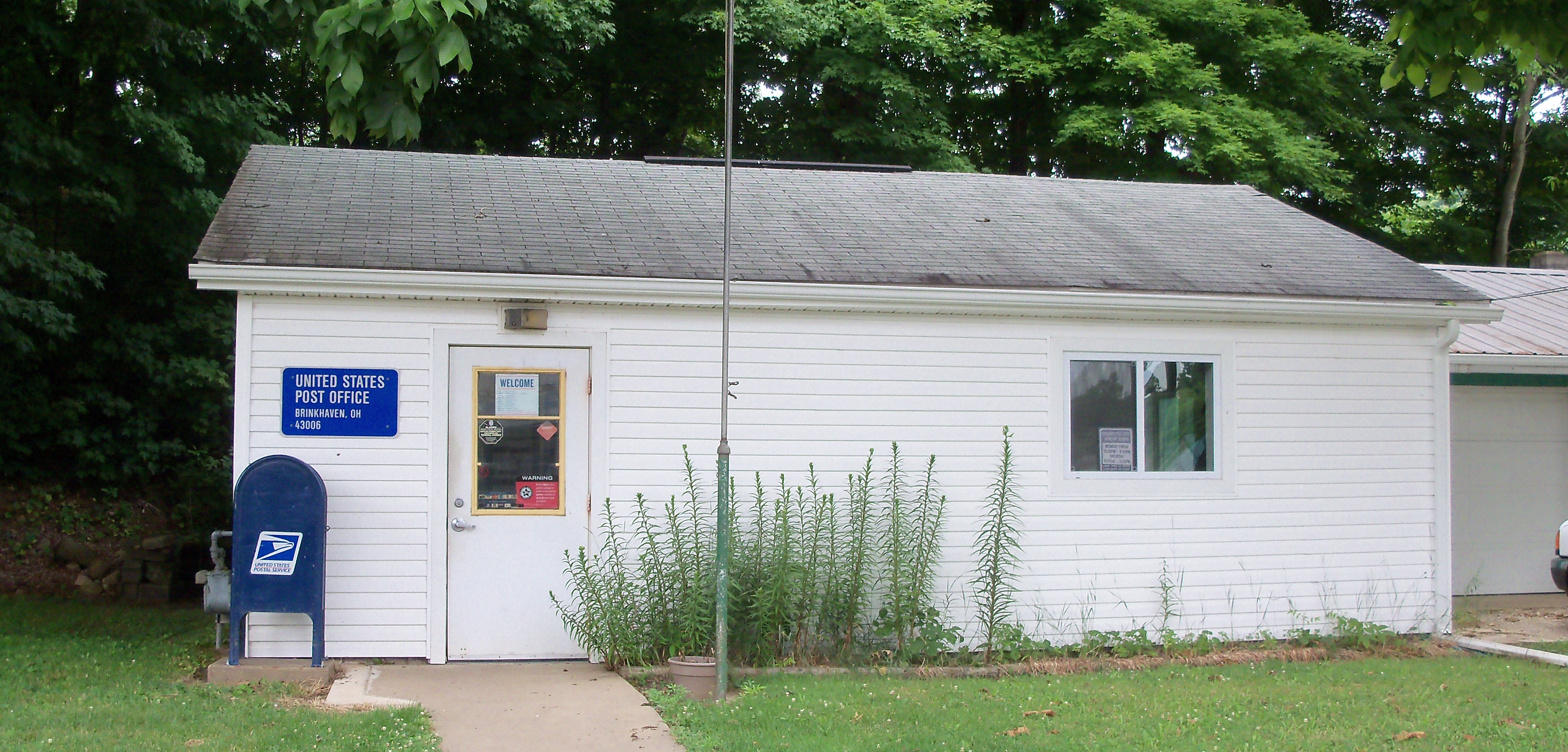
- Brinkhaven Post Office

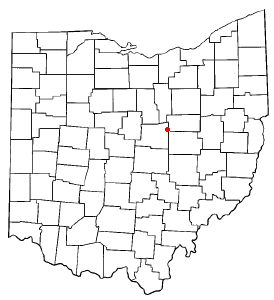
- Location of Brinkhaven, Ohio

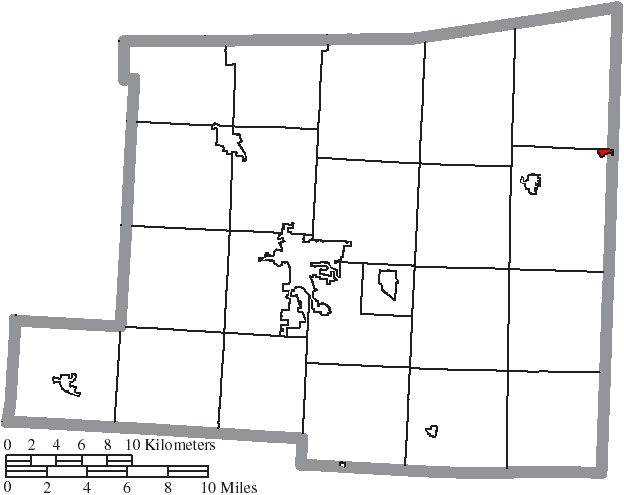
- Location of Brinkhaven in Knox County
- Coordinates: 40°28′09″N 82°11′29″W
- Country: United States
- State: Ohio
- County: Knox
- Township: Union

Government
  - Type: Mayor–council government
  - Body: Village Council
  - Mayor: Christopher Wyant

Area
  - Total: 0.20 sq mi (0.51 km^{2})
  - Land: 0.19 sq mi (0.48 km^{2})
  - Water: 0.012 sq mi (0.03 km^{2})
- Elevation: 925 ft (282 m)

Population (2020)
  - Total: 114
  - Estimate (2023): 111
  - Density: 616.4/sq mi (237.98/km^{2})
- Time zone: UTC-5 (Eastern (EST))
  - Summer (DST): UTC-4 (EDT)
- Postal Code: 43006
- Area code: 740
- FIPS code: 39-29288
- GNIS feature ID: 2398942
- Website: www.brinkhaven.gov

Brinkhaven is a village in Union Township, Knox County, Ohio, United States. The population was 114 at the 2020 census.

== History ==
Brinkhaven was formerly known as Nonpareil, Mount Holly, and Gann.

== Geography ==
Brinkhaven is located along the Mohican River.

According to the United States Census Bureau, the village has a total area of 0.20 square miles (0.52 km^{2}), of which 0.19 square miles (0.49 km^{2}) is land and 0.01 square miles (0.03 km^{2}) is water. The Bridge of Dreams is located on the Mohican River in Brinkhaven.

== Demographics ==
Historical population
Census	Pop.	Note	%±
1880	153		—
1900	250		—
1910	341		36.4%
1920	342		0.3%
1930	277		−19.0%
1940	187		−32.5%
1950	177		−5.3%
1960	191		7.9%
1970	172		−9.9%
1980	173		0.6%
1990	179		3.5%
2000	143		−20.1%
2010	125		−12.6%
2020	114		−8.8%
2023 (est.)	111		−2.6%
U.S. Decennial Census

=== 2010 census ===
As of the census of 2010, there were 125 people, 54 households, and 40 families living in the village. The population density was 657.9 inhabitants per square mile (254.0/km^{2}). There were 65 housing units at an average density of 342.1 per square mile (132.1/km^{2}). The racial makeup of the village was 100.0% White. Hispanic or Latino of any race were 2.4% of the population.

There were 54 households, of which 33.3% had children under the age of 18 living with them, 42.6% were married couples living together, 18.5% had a female householder with no husband present, 13.0% had a male householder with no wife present, and 25.9% were non-families. 22.2% of all households were made up of individuals, and 9.3% had someone living alone who was 65 years of age or older. The average household size was 2.31 and the average family size was 2.58.

The median age in the village was 42.2 years. 24.8% of residents were under the age of 18; 4% were between the ages of 18 and 24; 28% were from 25 to 44; 30.4% were from 45 to 64; and 12.8% were 65 years of age or older. The gender makeup of the village was 51.2% male and 48.8% female.

=== 2000 census ===
As of the census of 2000, there were 143 people, 51 households, and 36 families living in the village. The population density was 749.6 inhabitants per square mile (289.4/km^{2}). There were 55 housing units at an average density of 288.3 per square mile (111.3/km^{2}). The racial makeup of the village was 100.00% White. Hispanic or Latino of any race were 0.70% of the population.

There were 51 households, out of which 41.2% had children under the age of 18 living with them, 58.8% were married couples living together, 9.8% had a female householder with no husband present, and 29.4% were non-families. 27.5% of all households were made up of individuals, and 11.8% had someone living alone who was 65 years of age or older. The average household size was 2.80 and the average family size was 3.42.

In the village, the population was spread out, with 30.8% under the age of 18, 11.9% from 18 to 24, 28.7% from 25 to 44, 16.1% from 45 to 64, and 12.6% who were 65 years of age or older. The median age was 30 years. For every 100 females there were 93.2 males. For every 100 females age 18 and over, there were 110.6 males.

The median income for a household in the village was $37,500, and the median income for a family was $37,857. Males had a median income of $30,938 versus $11,750 for females. The per capita income for the village was $10,717. There were 5.6% of families and 17.7% of the population living below the poverty line, including 25.6% of under eighteens and none of those over 64.

== See also ==
- List of villages in Ohio
