= Rosella Rice =

American author, poet and lecturer

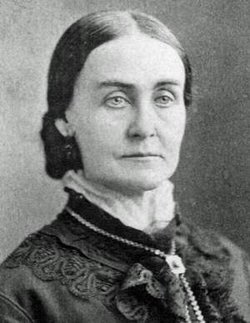
- Rice circa 1880s
- Born: August 11, 1827; Perrysville, Ohio, United States
- Died: June 6, 1888 (aged 60)
- Resting place: Perrysville Union Cemetery
- Occupations: Short story writer, author, poet, columnist
- Children: Lillie May Rice Stahl
- Writing career
- Pen name: Aunt Chatty Brooks; Pippsisaway "Pipsy" Potts; Mrs. Sam Starkey
- Language: English
- Years active: 1840-1888
- Notable work: Writings about her encounters with Johnny Appleseed

Rosella Rice (11 August 1827 – 6 June 1888) was an American author, poet, and lecturer born in Perrysville, Ohio. She was known for her direct and energetic comedy writing, her nature poems, and her vivid descriptions of folklore figure John "Johnny Appleseed" Chapman.

Rice published hundreds of magazine articles over a 40-year career. Her writings appeared in Cleveland and Columbus newspapers, Godey's Lady's Book, Indiana Farmer, Arthur's Home Magazine, Interior, Watchman, Journal and Messenger, Presbyterian Banner, Household, Housekeeper, Little Corporal, The Children's Hour, Toledo Blade, Western Rural and Woman's Journal.

Rice wrote under her own name as well as multiple pseudonyms that reflected different characters. These included Pipsissiway Potts, who provided tutorials and recipes; Aunt Chatty Brooks, who ran a boarding house for young women; and Mrs. Sam Starkey, an elderly gossip with a sense of humor. She wrote columns from these points of view for Arthur's, "creating fictional characters who inhabited her magazine's stories, and became 'real' to hundreds of readers".

Rice is perhaps best known for writing prose and poetry about her encounters with John "Johnny Appleseed" Chapman, who often visited Perrysville in his later years. Rice later corresponded with Chapman after he moved to Indiana, until his death in 1845. Her accounts of Appleseed were widely published and quoted in nonfiction books and newspapers. Possibly due to Rice's depictions, Appleseed became a hero of American folklore.

Rice also wrote extensively to mythologize the nostalgia of American pioneer life and was also a public lecturer.

Anna B. Quillin, Rice's editor at Arthur's, described Rice as "witty, humorous, quick to see the ludicrous, pathetic, sympathetic, helpful and at times sarcastic".

== Personal life ==
Rice was born on 11 August 1827, in Green Township, Richland County (now Ashland) to Sarah "Sallie" Johnson and Alexander Rice, second-generation colonists of Perrysville, Ohio. By way of her paternal ancestry, she was a descendant of Edmund Rice, an early immigrant to Massachusetts Bay Colony. She lived her entire life in her homestead birthplace. Three of her siblings survived to adulthood; Rosina, Reuben, and Isaac Johnson.

In 1841, Rice's mother Sarah Johnson died and in 1842, her father married Mary Van Scoyoc. Her paternal first cousin Americus V. Rice, also from Perryville, was a brigadier general in the Union Army during the American Civil War and served as a U.S. congressman.

In 1852, Rice gained access to the railroad, allowing her to take annual trips, that included attending seminars in Chautauqua, New York; mother-daughter trips to Lake Erie and Canada; and to Massachusetts, where her family had arrived as colonists in the 17th century. She may have traveled to Philadelphia where many of her articles were published.

Her step-mother Mary Van Scoyoc died in 1854, possibly due to childbirth. Rice moved back to Perrysville that year to raise her stepsisters Russell Bryte and Ida Josephine.

In 1873, Rice served on an awarding committee at the Mansfield State Fair, judging bread and butter. The event was held by the Ohio Agricultural Society.

On September 15, 1882, Rice was part of the group that unveiled the Copus Monument, a mass grave monument built in response to the War of 1812's Copus massacre. A cenotaph to Johnny Appleseed was prominently added to the monument, per Rice's suggestion. His cenotaph reads "Johnny Appleseed died Mar. 11, 1845. Buried near Ft. Wayne, Ind."

=== Lillie May Rice ===
Circa 1854, Rice gave birth to Lillie May Rice; the name of the father is not mentioned in sources. Rice was not interested in marriage and declined local men who proposed.

Lillie May Rice studied at Greentown Academy and Granville Female Seminary.

On June 13, 1889, a year after Rice's death, Lillie May Rice married Daniel W. Stahl, a former schoolteacher who began a blackboard business. The couple had three sons: Francis Clark (1891-1971), Russell Eugene (1892-1983), and Wilber Carol (1898-1977). Lillie May Rice Stahl primarily lived in Butler, Ohio, a village in Richland County, Ohio.

In 1917, 29 years after Rice's death, Rice's daughter Lillie May Rice Stahl published a comedic short story titled "The Lord's Sugar Bowl" in The Herald and Presbyter. Shortly thereafter in February 1919, Daniel Stahl died. Lillie May Rice Stahl died at their home in Butler, Ohio, on April 7, 1943.

== Writing and career ==
In 1840, around the age of 14, Rice's prose and poetry first appeared in newspapers and magazines in Mansfield, Ohio. During that time, she was documenting her interviews of first-generation colonists of Greentown.

In 1845, her writing was first published in the Ohio Cultivator in Columbus. According to Baughman, Rice's writings "were so well received by the public that she soon received remunerative offers from eastern publishers".

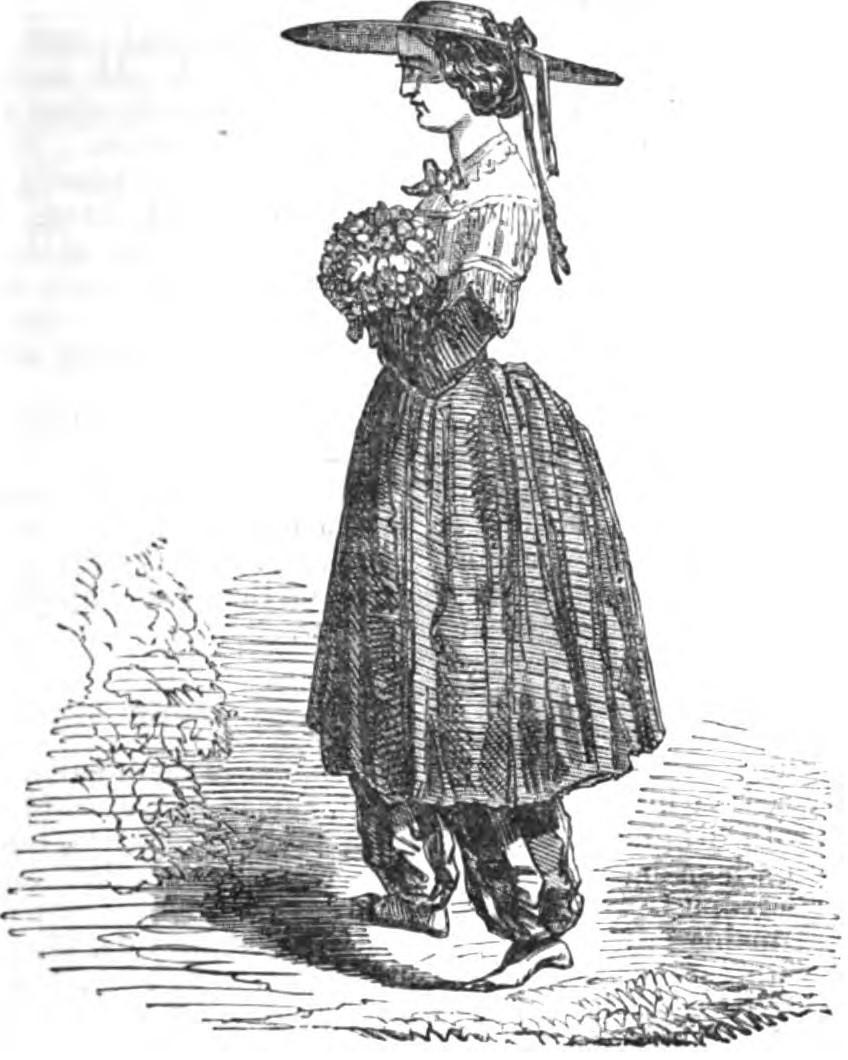
Rice's 1854 comedy article about dress reform displays her support for bloomer dresses.

In 1849, Rice wrote a humorous article about happiness for the Ohio Cultivator titled "The Light and the Shade". It begins:

Oh, I do so weary of these long drawn down faces with the hideous spirit of misanthropy, peering out of the many pairs of blue and gray and blear eyes that one meets with every day abroad in this lovely world of ours. Too bad! too bad! when everything around us is fair, pure and perfect enough to provoke even the criminal and conscience-seared to be glad and happy. Happiness is the cheapest commodity we have. Oh! as cheap as the sunshine is free ...

Some time before 1854, she moved to Columbus to edit and write for the Cultivator, but she moved back home in 1854 to attend to family. In 1854, at the age of 27, the Cultivator published her comedic article supporting bloomer dresses:

Every country girl ought to have at least two short dresses and panties [i.e. a knee-length skirt over bloused pantaloons] to match, not to wear to church and make prudes stare, and vulgar boys 'whew!' and precise old maids blush, but to wear about home on washing days and muddy weather when their work is not all in doors, and on dewy mornings to milk in, (unless their Pas and brothers are Yankees, bless 'em!) Why, I'd as soon think of going without my wide check or calico apron in the kitchen as not to have a short dress at all ... I am aware many ladies will object to this talk, and if they do, I forbid them holding forth in the Cultivator — so mind!

The same year, the Ashland Ohio Union published her comedic poem compiling Ohioan reactions to the first locomotives. Historian Peggy Mershon claims it "pokes fun at the old folks who ... weren't quite prepared for how fast and noisy [trains] were". The poem, titled "The First Whistle Among Our Hills", was published on May 17, 1854; some stanzas included:

Pat Wiggs sat eating when he heard a strange humming, "Lord Biddy!" he shrieked, "What on airth's a-coming!" Clinging to him she gaped with her nerves all a-quake. "Tis the devil," said she, "See! He goes like a sthrake!"

Pa Walter's the preacher, his sermon sat writing. The spirit within him gave aid in indicting, as deaf as a mallet was his withered old ear. "Ah, Gabriel!" he groaned, "Tis thy trumpet I hear."

In 1856, Rice was listed as a delegate by the Ohio State Teachers' Association for both the Ashland and Franklin counties.

In 1859, Rice published her novel Mabel: Or, Heart Histories: A Tale of Truth under Follett, Foster & Company of Columbus, Ohio. The book was listed in an 1859 British Publisher's Circular as one of 17 new North American novels, being a "work of interest published abroad".

In 1863, Rice contributed to nonfiction book A History of the Pioneer and Modern Times of Ashland County: From the Earliest to the Present Date by describing her encounters with John "Johnny Appleseed" Chapman, possibly helping to mythologize him with her fantastical descriptions. Her writing was later published in an 1871 Harper's Magazine and used as a significant source of information about Chapman's life. In the 1880s, Rice continued to write about Chapman for national magazines. In 1880, she contributed to Albert Adam Graham's History of Richland County, Ohio, which included a biography of Chapman and descriptions of his appearance. She eulogizes him, writing, "His bruised and bleeding feet now walk the gold-paved streets of the New Jerusalem ... [His was] a life full of labor and pain and unselfishness; humble unto self-abnegation; his memory glowing in our hearts, while his deeds live anew every springtime in the fragrance of the apple-blossoms he loved so well." Author Horace S. Knapp thanked and credited her for her contributions.

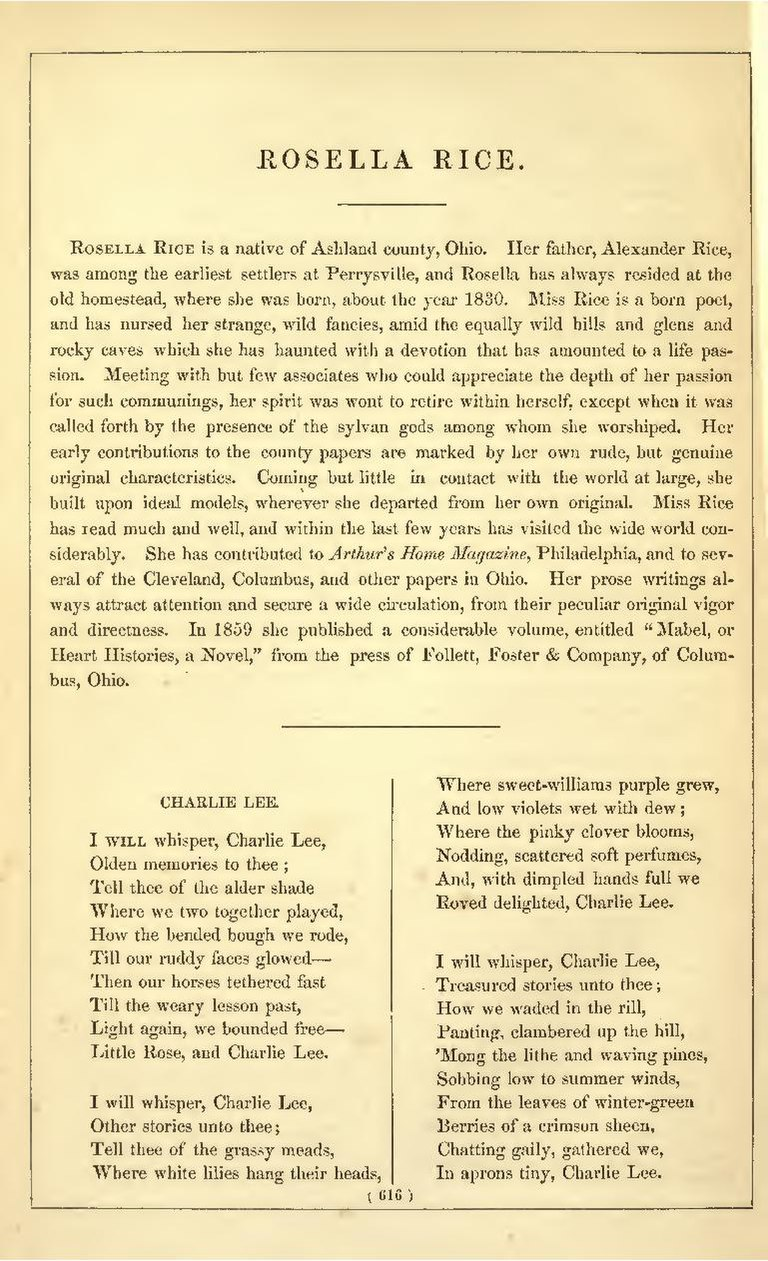
Part of Rice's feature in Coggeshall's 1860 poetry anthology, The Poets and Poetry of the West

In 1869, her children's short stories "The Children's Colt", "Mousie and Her Babies", were published in Philadelphia children's magazine The Children's Hour, published by T. S. Arthur & Sons.

In 1860, Rice was featured in William Turner Coggeshall's poetry anthology, The Poets and Poetry of the West: With Biographical and Critical Notices. The anthology included three of her poems, one of which was "Spirits of the Wildwood", written in full below:

Where the wanderer's foot hath seldom trod—
Where scarce a thought, unless of God,
Could fill the heart, oh, then and there
The wildwood spirits fill the air!

Within the glen, upon the hill,
The waterfall, the tinkling rill,
Within the vale embosomed deep
By trees and vines, and rocky steep,
Alone in deep, sweet solitude,
Dwell the wild spirits of the wood.

In 1860, describing Rice, William Turner Coggeshall wrote,

Rice is a born poet and has nursed her strange, wild fancies, amid the equally wild hills and glens and rocky caves which she has haunted with a devotion that has amounted to a life passion. Meeting with but few associates who could appreciate the depth of her passion for such communings, her spirit was wont to retire within herself, except when it was called forth by the presence of the sylvan gods among whom she worshiped. Her early contributions to the county papers are marked by her own rude, but genuine original characteristics ... Her prose writings always attract attention and secure a wide circulation, from their peculiar original vigor and directness.

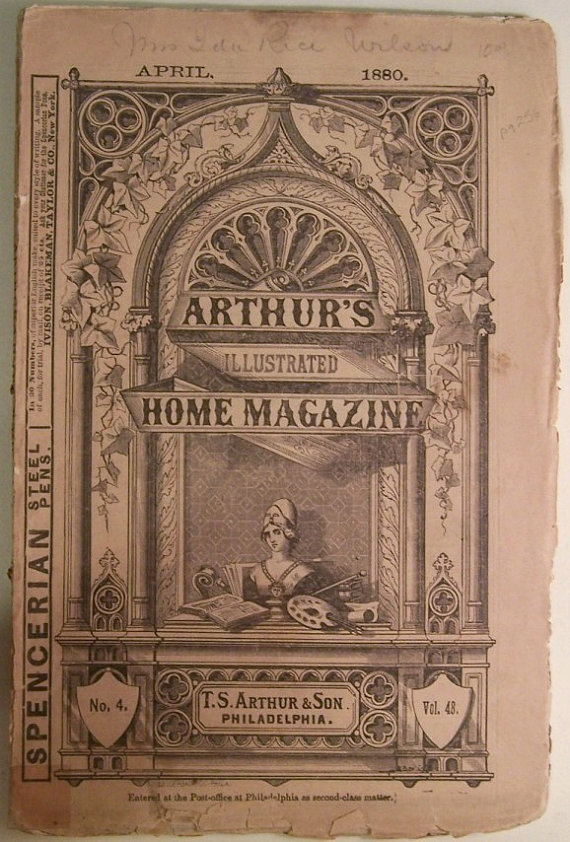
Rice's columns (under multiple pseudonyms) are repeatedly featured in this 1880 edition of Arthur's Home Magazine.

In her later years, Rice focused on poetry rather than prose, marking her writing with "her own charming and peculiar individual characteristics".

From 1871 to 1872, she published a series of articles titled "Other People's Windows" to Arthur's under her pen-name, Pipsissiway Potts, which attracted devoted readers.

In 1880 alone, multiple of Rice's writings were published in Arthur's under one of her pseudonym characters, Chatty Brooks. These included a comedy story, "Millwood Leaves", an essay about "Spending-Money for Women", and an advice article about appearance titled "Home Topics" in which she comedically makes reference to herself in third person as Aunt Chatty.

In 1885, she referenced Susan B. Anthony in her short story, "Affectionate John Baily" published in Arthur's:

We laughed a sorry sort of a laugh when we read about Susan B. Anthony teaching school for two dollars a week. We were forcibly reminded of our own school ma'am days. Well, it was a good discipline, and helped to make tough, cheery, heartsome women of us, though it was somewhat like the reason our dear mother user to give for whipping us: "I do it because I love you."

In 1887, her gingerbread recipe from the Toledo Blade was praised and published in Dr. Chase's Third, Last, and Complete Receipt Book. Dr. Chase writes, "This recipe is from Mrs. Rosella Rice, quite an extensive writer for the Blade 'Household.' It was given in answer to an inquiry for her gingerbread recipe, which, she says, 'I give with pleasure.' I take pleasure also, in giving it a place, for I know it is good."

== Legacy ==
Rice died of illness in 1888, at the age of 61. Her 1888 obituary in the Mansfield Shield and Banner expresses her reputation in her community:

Our town seemed almost paralyzed Wednesday morning, June 6th, when it was told from house to house that Rosella Rice was dead! Her illness had been so brief, and she was so much loved, that the news came to each family like a personal calamity. A sadness was over the entire community, and grief was depicted on every face.

The same year, Rice's biography was published in Appletons' Cyclopædia of American Biography, and The Housekeeper magazine described her writings in an in memoriam article. Additionally, her gingerbread recipe reappeared in the 1888 German translation of Dr. Chase's, titled Zum Angedenken. In 1901, Richland County historian Abraham J. Baughman described Rice as,

a born poet, a child of nature, and loved to roam over the hills and among the forest trees of her native heath and listen to the revels of the winds and commune with the spirits of the wildwood.

In 1997, Richland County historian Mary Jane Armstrong Henney published a book compiling Rice's work, biography, and genealogy titled Rosella's Reader: A Collection of Her Stories.

On July 28, 2011, museum curator Peggy Mershon hosted a Rosella Rice program at the Butler-Clear Fork Valley Historical Society Museum that described Rice's life and work. In 2011, Mershon also created a website for Rice, though it is now only accessible through web archives.

In a 2012 article, Lee Cavin attested,

[Rice] should be bristling with statues, or at least the bronze plaques done so well by the [Ohio] historical association ... I will continue to picture Rice in a cabin full of chattering children, writing with a dip pen, possibly from a bottle of home-made ink, making up names to take the credit for her work.

In 2020, Dr. Chase's Receipt Book book was re-published as Dr. Chase's Old-Time Home Remedies by Simon & Schuster, including Rice's gingerbread recipe from the Toledo Blade.

In 2020, the Muskingum Watershed Conservancy District unveiled 10 vacation log cabins with optional supplemental packages containing homemade soft drinks. The flavors featured local history, including "Gold Rush Orange" and "Appleseed Vanilla Cream". One of the soda flavors was "Rosella Rice Strawberry" to honor Rice's contributions to Ohio history.

== See also ==
- List of poets from the United States
- Timothy Shay Arthur, creator of Arthur's Home Magazine
- Louisa May Alcott and Harriet Beecher Stowe, contemporaneous American authors of prose and poetry
