= Hell Town, Ohio =

Native American village

Coordinates: 40.63027778°N 82.37972222°W

- Historic Native American village
- Nickname(s): Clear Town, Clear Water Town
- Interactive map of Hell Town, Ohio
- Country: United States
- State: Ohio
- County: Ashland

Government
  - Chief: Paxomet (Captain Thomas Armstrong)
- Time zone: UTC-5 (Eastern (EST))
  - Summer (DST): UTC-4 (EDT)

Hell Town is the name for a Lenape (or Delaware) Native-American village located on Clear Creek near the abandoned town of Newville, in the U.S. state of Ohio. The site is on a high hill just north of the junction of Clear Creek and the Black Fork of the Mohican River.

After the signing of the Treaty of Easton in 1758, the Lenape were required to move west out of their native lands (in Delaware, New Jersey, eastern New York, and eastern Pennsylvania) into what is today known as Ohio. The village had originally been settled by Native Americans of the Mingo, Haudenosaunee migrants to the Ohio Valley. But the Mingo abandoned the site around 1755. Under Chief Paxomet (also known as Captain Thomas Armstrong), the Lenape re-founded the settlement in the 1770s. One source says the resettlement came in 1770, while another says it was in 1776. According to the Lenape, the village was called Clear Town, after the clear stream which ran nearby. However, when the Lenape learned that the German word for "clear" was "hell," they renamed their village Hell Town. The site was abandoned in 1782 because of repeated clashes with Colonial American troops and settlers, angry with the Lenape because some members of the tribe had sided with the British during the American Revolution. The violence would culminate in the Gnadenhutten massacre of 1782, in which American militia killed 96 Lenape. Hell Town was located along the Cuyahoga War Trail, a "war trail" used by Native Americans in the region, which ran from a point about 30 miles (48 km) south of Sandusky, Ohio, north-northeast into the Cuyahoga River valley.

Anthropological investigations in the late 19th century found that the site of the village was a high mound composed primarily of sandstone rocks, held in place with packed earth. A number of Lenape graves existed at the site until 1881, but local farmers plowed them under over the next two years. Diggings at the site found two iron knives, an iron tomahawk, stone arrowheads, a stone axe, a gun flint, and some brass mountings from a musket.

== Bibliography ==
- Case, H.B. "Description of Mounds and Earthworks in Ashland County, Ohio." In Miscellaneous Papers Relating to Anthropology. Washington, D.C.: Government Printing Office, 1883.
- Cherry, Peter Peterson. The Portage Path. Akron, Ohio: The Western Reserve Company, 1911.
- Howe, Henry. Historical Collections of Ohio: Containing a Collection of the Most Interesting Facts, Traditions, Biographical Sketches, Anecdotes, Etc. Relating to Its Counties, Principal Towns and Villages. Norwalk, Ohio: Laning Printing Co., 1896.
- Jennings, Francis and McNickle, D'Arcy. The History and Culture of Iroquois Diplomacy. Syracuse, N.Y.: Syracuse University Press, 1985.
- Keenan, Jerry. Encyclopedia of American Indian Wars, 1492-1890. New York: W.W. Norton, 1999.
- Moore, Charles. The Northwest Under Three Flags, 1635-1796. New York: Harper and Bros., 1900.
- Olmstead, Earl P. Blackcoats Among the Delaware: David Zeisberger on the Ohio Frontier. Kent, Ohio: Kent State University Press, 1991.
- Roeber, A.G. and Kade, Max. Ethnographies and Exchanges: Native Americans, Moravians, and Catholics in Early North America. University Park, Pa.: Pennsylvania State University Press, 2008.
- Schonberg, Marcia. Ohio Native Peoples. Chicago, Ill.: Heinemann Library, 2010.
- Sisson, Richard. The American Midwest: An Interpretive Encyclopedia. Bloomington, Ind.: Indiana University Press, 2006.
- Wheeler-Voegelin, Erminie and Tanner, Helen Hornbeck. Indians of Northern Ohio and Southeastern Michigan: An Ethnohistorical Report. New York: Garland Publishing, 1974.
