= Boston Lyceum Bureau =

Defunct American booking agency

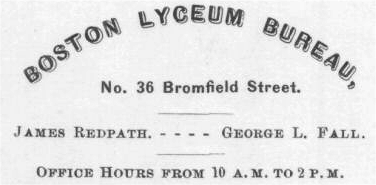
The Boston Lyceum Bureau, Bromfield St., Boston, 1872

The Boston Lyceum Bureau (est.1868) in Boston, Massachusetts, was a project of James Redpath and George L. Fall. Its office stood at no.36 Bromfield Street. "Through its agency, many ... lecturers and authors of celebrity have been introduced to American audiences," including Frederick Douglass, Mark Twain, and George MacDonald.

The partnership dissolved around 1874. Redpath continued briefly with the "Redpath Lyceum Bureau" which featured many of the same lecturers and performers as before. Eventually, other proprietors took over and the "Boston Lyceum Bureau" and the "Redpath Lyceum Bureau" expanded vigorously into the 20th century, with branches throughout the United States.

== Lecturers/Performers ==
- Susan B. Anthony
- Henry Ward Beecher
- Josh Billings
- Emma Hardinge Britten
- Moses T. Brown
- Isabella Dallas-Glynn
- Frederick Douglass
- Adrian J. Ebell
- Fanny R. Edmunds
- Ralph Waldo Emerson
- Thomas Fitch
- Edward Everett Hale
- B. Waterhouse Hawkins
- John Hay
- Isaac I. Hayes
- Thomas Wentworth Higginson
- Lottie Hough
- Julia Ward Howe
- The Hyers Sisters
- Mary A. Livermore
- David Ross Locke
- Sam Lucas
- George MacDonald
- Mendelssohn Quintette Club
- Rev. W.H.H. Murray
- Mr. & Mrs. Madison Obrey
- Oliver Optic
- Wendell Phillips
- Kate Reignolds
- Erminia Rudersdorff
- Matthew Hale Smith
- Elizabeth Cady Stanton
- Charles Sumner
- Virginia F. Townsend
- Mark Twain
- Edwin Percy Whipple

== See also ==
- James Redpath
