= Virginia Frances Townsend =

American author

- Born: 1836 New Haven, Connecticut
- Died: August 11, 1920 Arlington, Massachusetts
- Occupation: author

Virginia Frances Townsend (1836 – August 11, 1920) was an American author.

She was editor of Arthur's Lady's Home Magazine and a contributing author to other magazines. She later taught at Dr. Dio Lewis's School for Young Ladies, where she was an advocate of exercise and physical education for women. She was a member of the Boston Authors Club.

A group of librarians in Boston put Townsend's name on a list of authors whose books should be banned from libraries because of "false and dangerous ideas of life" purportedly in the books.

== Selected work ==
- Only girls (1872) Boston: Lee and Shepard
- That Queer Girl (1874) Boston: Lee & Shepard
- One Woman's Two Lovers (1875) Philadelphia: J.B. Lippincott
- A Boston Girl's Ambitions, (1887) Boston: Lee and Shepard; New York: C.T. Dillingham
