= Johnny Appleseed =

American pioneer nurseryman (1774–1845)

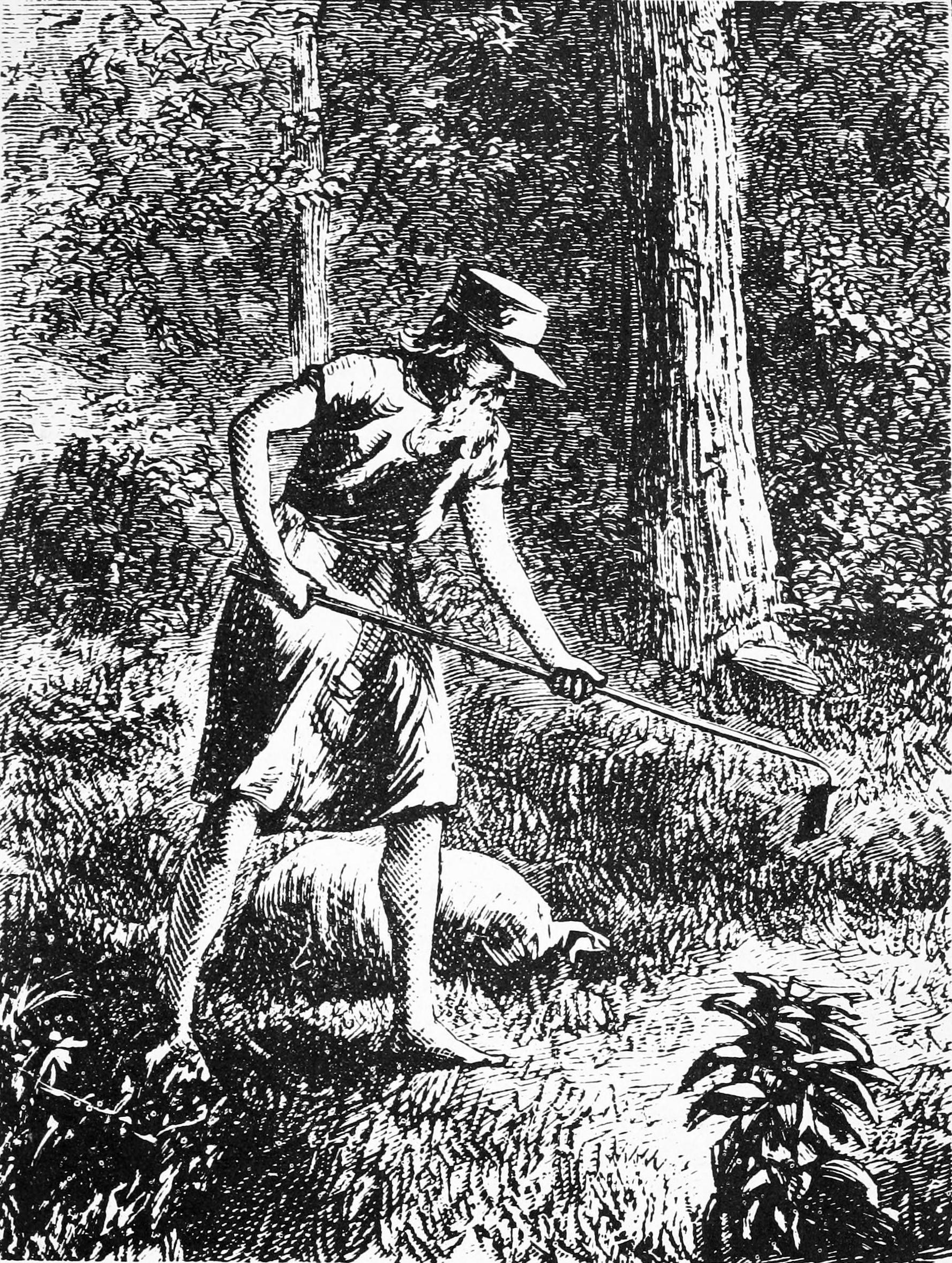
- An etching of Chapman from Harper's New Monthly Magazine (1871)
- Born: John Chapman; September 26, 1774: Leominster, Province of Massachusetts Bay, British America
- Died: March 18, 1845 (aged 70); Fort Wayne, Indiana, U.S.
- Occupations: Nurseryman; conservationist; missionary
- Known for: Proliferation of orchards throughout the American frontier

John Chapman (September 26, 1774 – March 18, 1845), better known as Johnny Appleseed, was an American pioneer nurseryman who introduced trees grown with apple seeds (as opposed to trees grown with grafting) to large parts of Pennsylvania, Ohio, Indiana, Illinois, and the Canadian province of Ontario, as well as the northern counties of West Virginia. He became an American icon while still alive, due to his kind, generous ways, his leadership in conservation, and the symbolic importance that he attributed to apples. He was the inspiration for many museums and historical sites such as the Johnny Appleseed Museum in Urbana, Ohio, and today is recognized as an American folk hero.

== Family ==
Chapman was born on September 26, 1774, in Leominster, Province of Massachusetts Bay, the second child of Nathaniel and Elizabeth Chapman (née Simonds, married February 8, 1770). His birthplace has a granite marker, and the street is now called Johnny Appleseed Lane.

Chapman's mother Elizabeth died in 1776, shortly after giving birth to her second son Nathaniel Jr., who died a few days later. In 1780, his father Nathaniel returned to Longmeadow, Massachusetts where he married Lucy Cooley.

Author Rosella Rice states, "Johnny had one sister, Persis Broom, of Indiana. She was not at all like him; a very ordinary woman, talkative, and free in her frequent, 'says she's' and 'says I's.'"

According to some accounts, 18-year-old John persuaded his 11-year-old half-brother Nathaniel Cooley Chapman to go west with him in 1792. The duo apparently lived a nomadic life until their father brought his large family west in 1805 and met up with them in Ohio. Nathaniel decided to stay and help their father farm the land.

Shortly after the brothers parted ways, John began his apprenticeship as an orchardist under a Mr. Crawford who grew apples, thus inspiring Chapman's life journey of planting apple trees. In 1800 at age 26, Chapman was in Licking River, Ohio. His first orchard was on the farm of Isaac Stadden in Licking County. In 1806, he embarked upon a canoe voyage down the Ohio, Muskingum, and Walhonding Rivers, using two canoes lashed together to transport himself and his seeds.

== Life ==
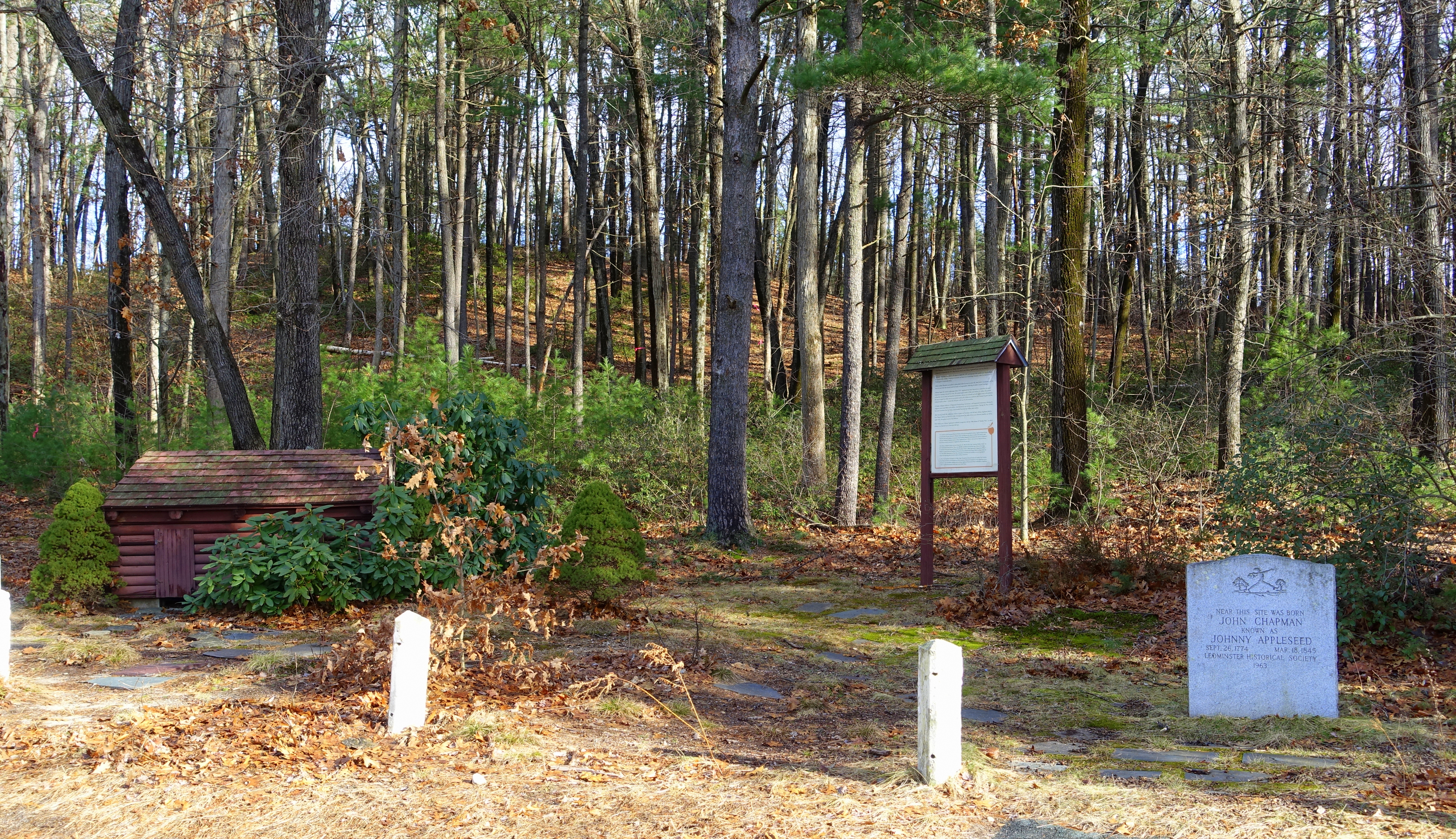
Johnny Appleseed Birthplace site in Leominster, Massachusetts

There are stories of Johnny Appleseed practicing his nurseryman craft in the area of Wilkes-Barre, Pennsylvania, and of picking seeds from the pomace at Potomac River cider mills in the late 1790s. Another story has Chapman living in Pittsburgh on Grant's Hill in 1794 at the time of the Whiskey Rebellion.

The popular image is of Johnny Appleseed spreading apple seeds randomly everywhere he went. In fact, he planted nurseries rather than orchards, built fences around them to protect them from livestock and wildlife, left the nurseries in the care of a neighbor who sold trees on shares, and returned every year or two to tend the nursery. He planted his first nursery on the bank of Brokenstraw Creek, south of Warren, Pennsylvania. Next, he seems to have moved to Venango County, along the shore of French Creek, but many of these nurseries were in the Mohican River area of north-central Ohio. This area included the towns of Mansfield, Lisbon, Lucas, Perrysville and Loudonville.

In 1817, a bulletin of the Church of New Jerusalem printed in Manchester, England was the first to publish a written report about Chapman. It described a missionary who traveled around the West to sow apple seeds and pass out books of The New Church.

In 1819, Chapman was nearly killed in an accident in Ohio. One morning, he was picking his crops in a tree when he fell and caught his neck in the fork of the branches. Shortly after he fell, eight year-old John White found him struggling. White cut the tree down, saving Chapman's life.

In 1822, the first known use of "John Appleseed" was written in a letter from a member of the New Church.

According to Harper's New Monthly Magazine, toward the end of his career he was present when an itinerant missionary was exhorting an open-air congregation in Mansfield, Ohio. The sermon was long and severe on the topic of extravagance, because the pioneers were buying such indulgences as calico and imported tea. "Where now is there a man who, like the primitive Christians, is traveling to heaven barefooted and clad in coarse raiment?" the preacher repeatedly asked, until Johnny Appleseed walked up to him, put his bare foot on the stump that had served as a pulpit, and said, "Here's your primitive Christian!"

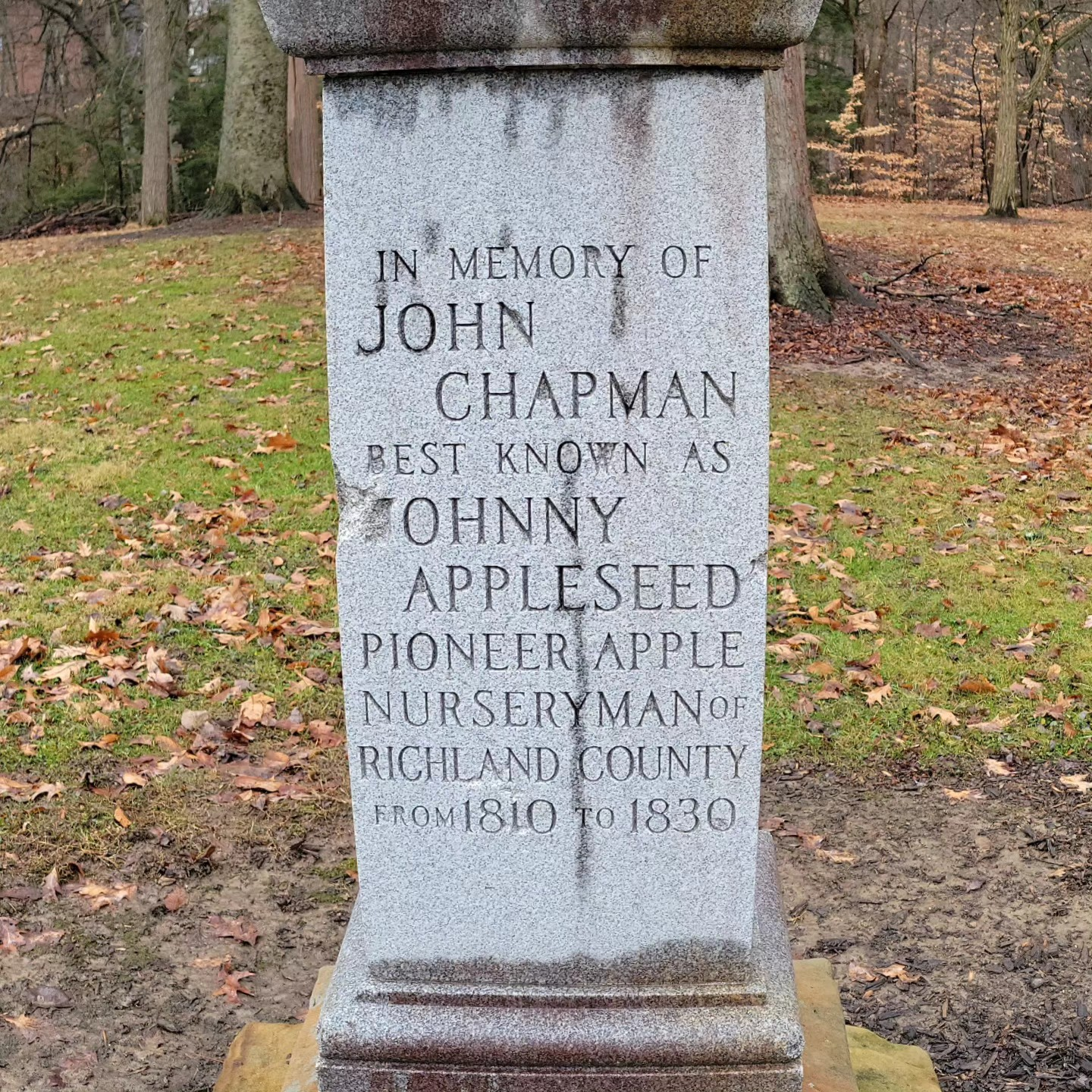
Monument to John Chapman in South Park, Mansfield, Ohio

Author Rosella Rice met Chapman in his later years, and she stated in the 1863 History of Ashland County, Ohio:

His personal appearance was as singular as his character. He was a small, "chunked" man, quick and restless in his motions and conversation; his beard, though not long, was unshaven, and his hair was long and dark, and his eye black and sparkling. He lived the roughest life, and often slept in the woods. His clothing was mostly old, being generally given to him in exchange for apple-trees. He went bare-footed, and often traveled miles through the snow in that way.... [He] wore on his head a tin utensil which answered both as a cap and a mush pot.

Historian Paul Aron wrote, "Chapman was actually a successful businessman. He bought many of the parcels of land on which he planted his seeds and ultimately accumulated about twelve hundred acres across three states.... He wore pauper's clothing by choice and not out of necessity."

Chapman would tell stories to children and spread New Church teachings to the adults, receiving in return a floor to sleep on for the night, and sometimes supper. Rice stated, "We can hear him read now, just as he did that summer day, when we were busy quilting upstairs, and he lay near the door, his voice rising denunciatory and thrilling—strong and loud as the roar of wind and waves, then soft and soothing as the balmy airs that quivered the morning-glory leaves about his gray beard. His was a strange eloquence at times, and he was undoubtedly a man of genius."

Chapman cared deeply about animals, including insects. Henry Howe visited all the counties in Ohio in the early nineteenth century and collected several stories from the 1830s, when Johnny Appleseed was still alive:

One cool autumnal night, while lying by his camp-fire in the woods, he observed that the mosquitoes flew in the blaze and were burned. Johnny, who wore on his head a tin utensil which answered both as a cap and a mush pot, filled it with water and quenched the fire, and afterwards remarked, "God forbid that I should build a fire for my comfort, that should be the means of destroying any of His creatures." Another time, he allegedly made a camp-fire in a snowstorm at the end of a hollow log in which he intended to pass the night, but he found it occupied by a bear and cubs, so he removed his fire to the other end and slept on the snow in the open air, rather than disturb the bear.

In a story collected by Eric Braun, he had a pet wolf that had started following him after he healed its injured leg.

According to another story, he heard that a horse was to be put down, so he bought the horse, bought a few grassy acres nearby, and turned it out to recover. When it did, he gave the horse to someone needy, exacting a promise to treat it humanely.

More controversially, he also planted dogfennel during his travels, believing that it was a useful medicinal herb. Although it is native to the southern and eastern United States, it spreads aggressively and can be difficult to manage.

During his later life, he was a vegetarian. Chapman chose not to marry, as he believed that he would find his soulmate in Heaven if she did not appear to him on Earth.

== Death ==
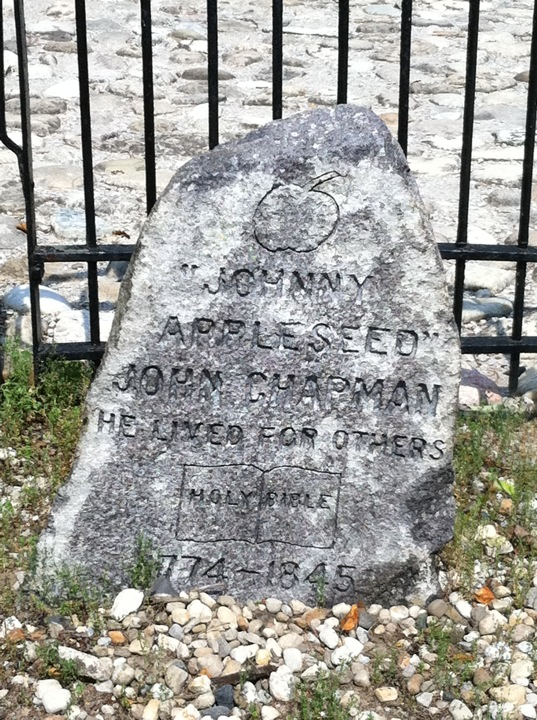
Disputed possible gravesite of Johnny Appleseed

Different dates are listed for his death. Harper's New Monthly Magazine of November 1871 was apparently incorrect in saying that he died in mid-1847, though this is taken by many as the primary source of information about John Chapman. Multiple Indiana newspapers reported his death date as March 18, 1845. The Goshen Democrat published a death notice for him in its March 27, 1845, edition, citing the day of death as March 18 of that year. The paper's death notice read:

In Fort Wayne, on Tuesday, 18th, inst John Chapman, commonly known by the name of Johnny Appleseed, about 70 years of age. Many of our citizens will remember this eccentric individual, as he sauntered through town eating his dry rusk and cold meat, and freely conversing on the mysteries of his religious faith. He was a devoted follower of Emanuel Swedenborg, and notwithstanding his apparent poverty, was reputed to be in good circumstances.

The Fort Wayne Sentinel printed his obituary on March 22, 1845, saying that he died on March 18:

On the same day in this neighborhood, at an advanced age, Mr. John Chapman (better known as Johnny Appleseed).

The deceased was well known through this region by his eccentricity, and the strange garb he usually wore. He followed the occupation of a nurseryman, and has been a regular visitor here upwards of 10 years. He was a native of Pennsylvania we understand but his home—if home he had—for some years past was in the neighborhood of Cleveland, where he has relatives living. He is supposed to have considerable property, yet denied himself almost the common necessities of life—not so much perhaps for avarice as from his peculiar notions on religious subjects. He was a follower of Swedenborg and devoutly believed that the more he endured in this world the less he would have to suffer and the greater would be his happiness hereafter—he submitted to every privation with cheerfulness and content, believing that in so doing he was securing snug quarters hereafter.

In the most inclement weather he might be seen barefooted and almost naked except when he chanced to pick up articles of old clothing. Notwithstanding the privations and exposure he endured, he lived to an extreme old age, not less than 80 years at the time of his death—though no person would have judged from his appearance that he was 60. He always carried with him some work on the doctrines of Swedenborg with which he was perfectly familiar, and would readily converse and argue on his tenets, using much shrewdness and penetration.

His death was quite sudden. He was seen on our streets a day or two previous.

Rosella Rice wrote in 1863:

He died near Fort Wayne, Indiana, in 1846 or 1848, a stranger among strangers, who kindly cared for him. He died the death of the righteous, calmly and peacefully, and with little suffering or pain. So long as his memory lives will a grateful people say: "He went about doing good."

The site of his grave is also disputed. Developers of the Canterbury Green apartment complex and golf course in Fort Wayne, Indiana, claim that his grave is there, marked by a rock. That is where the Worth cabin sat in which he died.

Steven Fortriede, director of the Allen County Public Library (ACPL) and author of the 1978 Johnny Appleseed, believes that another gravesite is the correct site, in Johnny Appleseed Park in Fort Wayne. Johnny Appleseed Park is a Fort Wayne city park that adjoins Archer Park, an Allen County park. Archer Park is the site of John Chapman's grave marker and used to be a part of the Archer family farm.

The Worth family attended First Baptist Church in Fort Wayne, according to records at ACPL. According to an 1858 interview with Richard Worth Jr., Chapman was buried "respectably" in the Archer cemetery, and Fortriede believes that use of the term "respectably" indicates that Chapman was buried in the hallowed ground of Archer cemetery instead of near the cabin where he died.

John H. Archer, grandson of David Archer, wrote in a letter dated October 4, 1900:

The historical account of his death and burial by the Worths and their neighbors, the Pettits, Goinges, Porters, Notestems, Parkers, Beckets, Whitesides, Pechons, Hatfields, Parrants, Ballards, Randsells, and the Archers in David Archer's private burial grounds is substantially correct. The grave, more especially the common head-boards used in those days, have long since decayed and become entirely obliterated, and at this time I do not think that any person could with any degree of certainty come within fifty feet of pointing out the location of his grave. Suffice it to say that he has been gathered in with his neighbors and friends, as I have enumerated, for the majority of them lie in David Archer's graveyard with him.

In 1934, a committee of the Johnny Appleseed Commission Council of the City of Fort Wayne reported, "[A]s a part of the celebration of Indiana's 100th birthday in 1916 an iron fence was placed in the Archer graveyard by the Horticulture Society of Indiana setting off the grave of Johnny Appleseed. At that time, there were men living who had attended the funeral of Johnny Appleseed. Direct and accurate evidence was available then. There was little or no reason for them to make a mistake about the location of this grave. They located the grave in the Archer burying ground."

== Legacy ==
Johnny Appleseed left an estate of over 1,200 acres (490 ha) of valuable nurseries to his sister. He also owned four plots in Allen County, Indiana, including a nursery in Milan Township with 15,000 trees, and two plots in Mount Vernon, Ohio. He bought the southwest quarter (160 acres; 65 ha) of section 26, Mohican Township, Ashland County, Ohio, but did not record the deed and lost the property.

The financial panic of 1837 took a toll on his estate. Trees brought only two or three cents each, as opposed to the "fippenny bit" (about six and a quarter cents) that he usually got. Some of his land was sold to pay taxes following his death, and litigation used up much of the rest.

In 1880, abolitionist author Lydia Maria Child mythologized Appleseed in a poem:

In cities, some said the old man was crazy
While others said he was only lazy;
But he took no notice of gibes and jeers,
He knew he was working for future years...

And if they inquire whence came such trees
Where not a bough once swayed in the breeze,
The answer still comes, as they travel on,
"These trees were planted by Apple-Seed John."

In 1921, 1923, 1927, and 1928, American song poet Vachel Lindsay published poems about Johnny Appleseed. One of these poems was the source text for Eunice Lea Kettering's prize-winning choral-orchestral composition Johnny Appleseed. Gail Kubik composed a work for bass, chorus and orchestra called In Praise of Johnny Appleseed; this work was also based on the eponymous Vachel Lindsay poem, and entered into the same 1942 National Federation of Music Clubs composition competition as Kettering's work.

In 1933, poets Rosemary Carr Benét and Stephen Vincent Benét mythologized Appleseed in their children's poetry book A Book of Americans.

In Disney's 1948 film Melody Time, Appleseed is featured in an animated musical segment titled "The Legend of Johnny Appleseed".

The first recorded Johnny Appleseed Festival was held in 1968 in Lisbon, Ohio. The festival takes place the third weekend of September in downtown with food and entertainment taking up just over 2 square blocks. Amusement rides are among the 100+ vendors and attractions. Since 1975 in Fort Wayne, Indiana, the Johnny Appleseed Festival has been held the third full weekend in September in Johnny Appleseed Park and in Archer Park. Musicians, demonstrators, and vendors dress in early-19th-century attire and offer food and beverages that would have been available then. Similar festivals are held in Sheffield, PA; Apple Creek, OH; Crystal Lake, IL; Lisbon, OH; and Paradise, CA.

From 1962 to 1980, a high school athletic league made up of schools from around the Mansfield, Ohio, area used the name the "Johnny Appleseed Conference".

In 1966, the Post Office Department issued a five-cent stamp commemorating Johnny Appleseed.

A bronze statue of Chapman sits on a bench on Jefferson Boulevard in Fort Wayne, Indiana, offering a red apple to visitors who sit beside him. Unveiled in 2020, the sculpture was created by Gary Tillery.

March 11 and September 26 are sometimes celebrated as Johnny Appleseed Day. The September date is Appleseed's acknowledged birthdate, but the March date is sometimes preferred because it falls during planting season.

Johnny Appleseed Elementary School is a public school in Leominster, Massachusetts, his birthplace. Mansfield, Ohio, one of Appleseed's stops in his peregrinations, was home to Johnny Appleseed Middle School until it closed in 1989.

In 1984, Jill and Michael Gallina published a biographical musical, Johnny Appleseed.

In 2016, John Chapman appeared in Tracy Chevalier's historical fiction novel At the Edge of the Orchard.

A large terracotta sculpture of Johnny Appleseed, created by Viktor Schreckengost (1906–2008), adorns the front of the Lakewood High School Civic Auditorium in Lakewood, Ohio. Although the local board of education deemed Appleseed too "eccentric" a figure to grace the front of the building (renaming the sculpture simply "Early Settler"), students, teachers, and parents alike still call the sculpture by its intended name: "Johnny Appleseed".

Urbana University in Urbana, Ohio, maintains one of two Johnny Appleseed museums in the world, which is open to the public. The Johnny Appleseed Educational Center and Museum hosts a number of artifacts, as well as trees that are descended from the same trees originally planted by Johnny Appleseed. They also provide a number of services for research, including a national registry of Johnny Appleseed's relatives. In 2011, the museum was renovated and updated. The educational center and museum was founded on the belief that those who have the opportunity to study the life of Johnny Appleseed will share his appreciation of education, his country, the environment, peace, moral integrity, and leadership.

Supposedly, the only surviving tree planted by Johnny Appleseed grows on the farm of Richard and Phyllis Algeo of Nova, Ohio. Some marketers claim that it is a Rambo; some even make the claim that the Rambo was "Johnny Appleseed's favorite variety", ignoring the fact that he had religious objections to grafting and preferred wild apples to all named varieties. It appears that most nurseries are calling the tree the "Johnny Appleseed" variety, rather than a Rambo. Unlike the mid-summer Rambo, the Johnny Appleseed variety ripens in September and is a baking-applesauce variety similar to an Albemarle Pippin. Nurseries offer the Johnny Appleseed tree as an immature apple tree for planting, with scions from the Algeo stock grafted on them. Orchardists do not appear to be marketing the fruit of this tree.

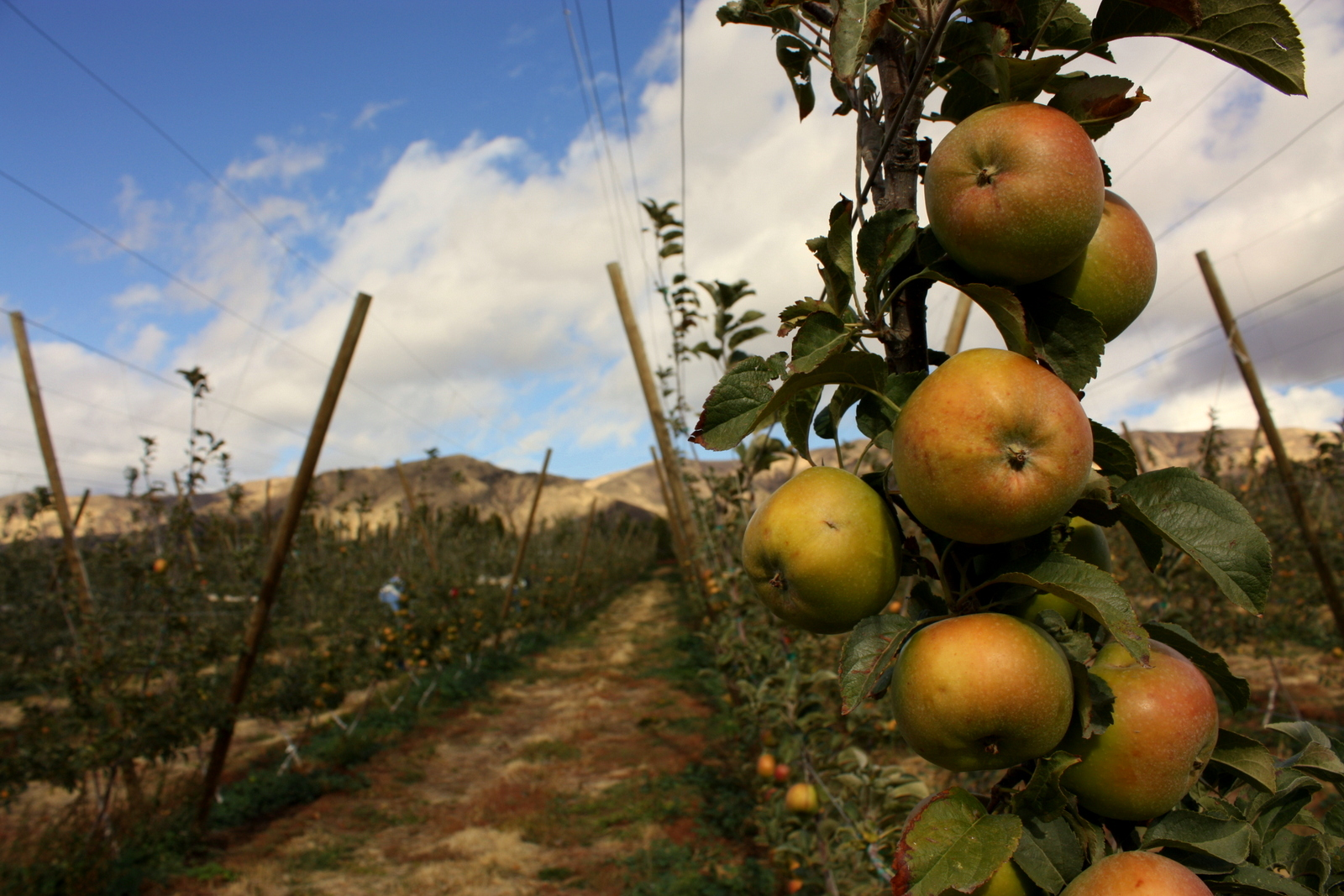
A variety called the "Johnny Appleseed" is similar to these Albemarle Pippins, good for baking and apple sauce.

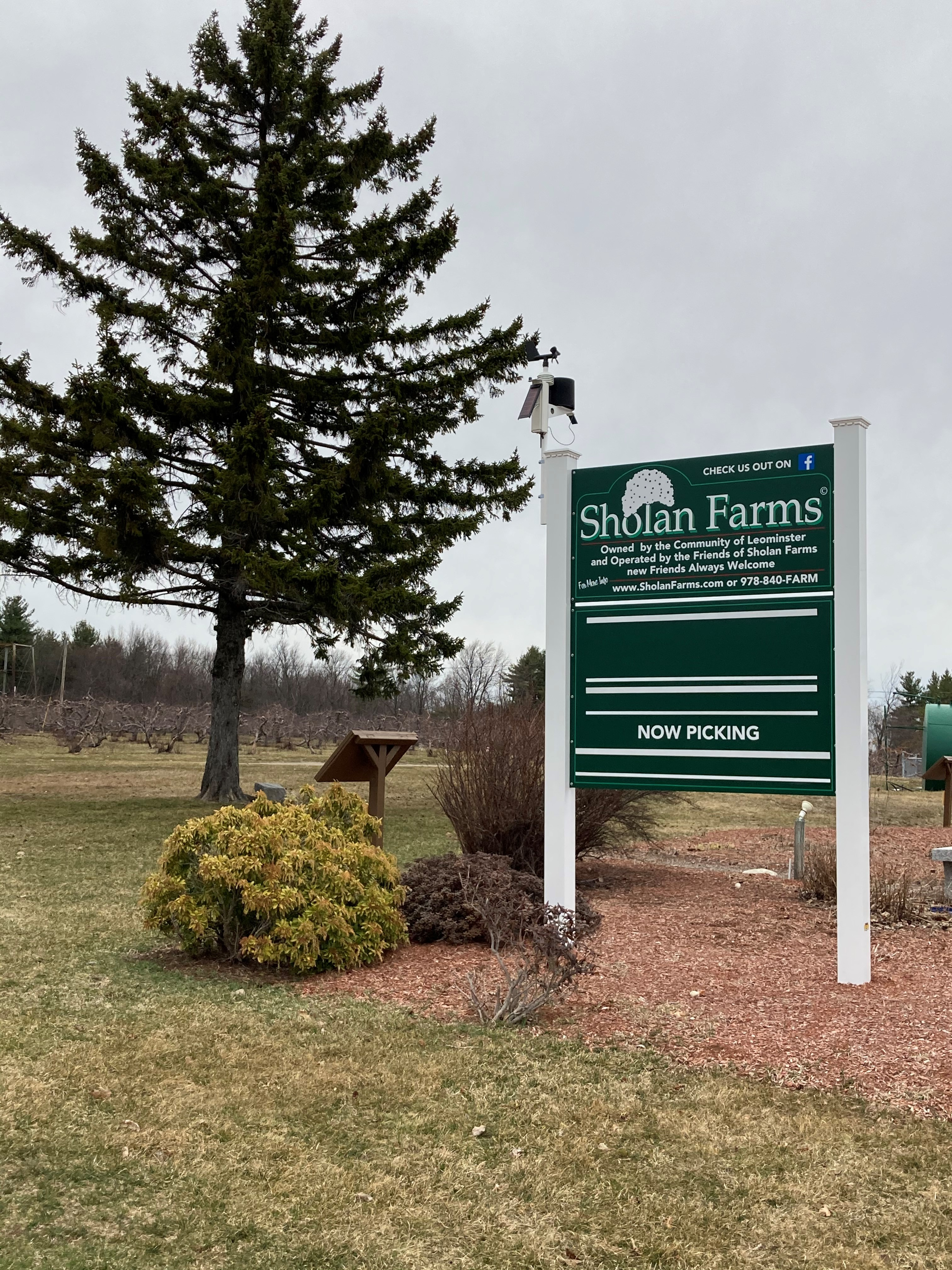
Community owned Sholan Farms—the last working apple orchard in the birthplace of Johnny Appleseed-Leominster, Ma.

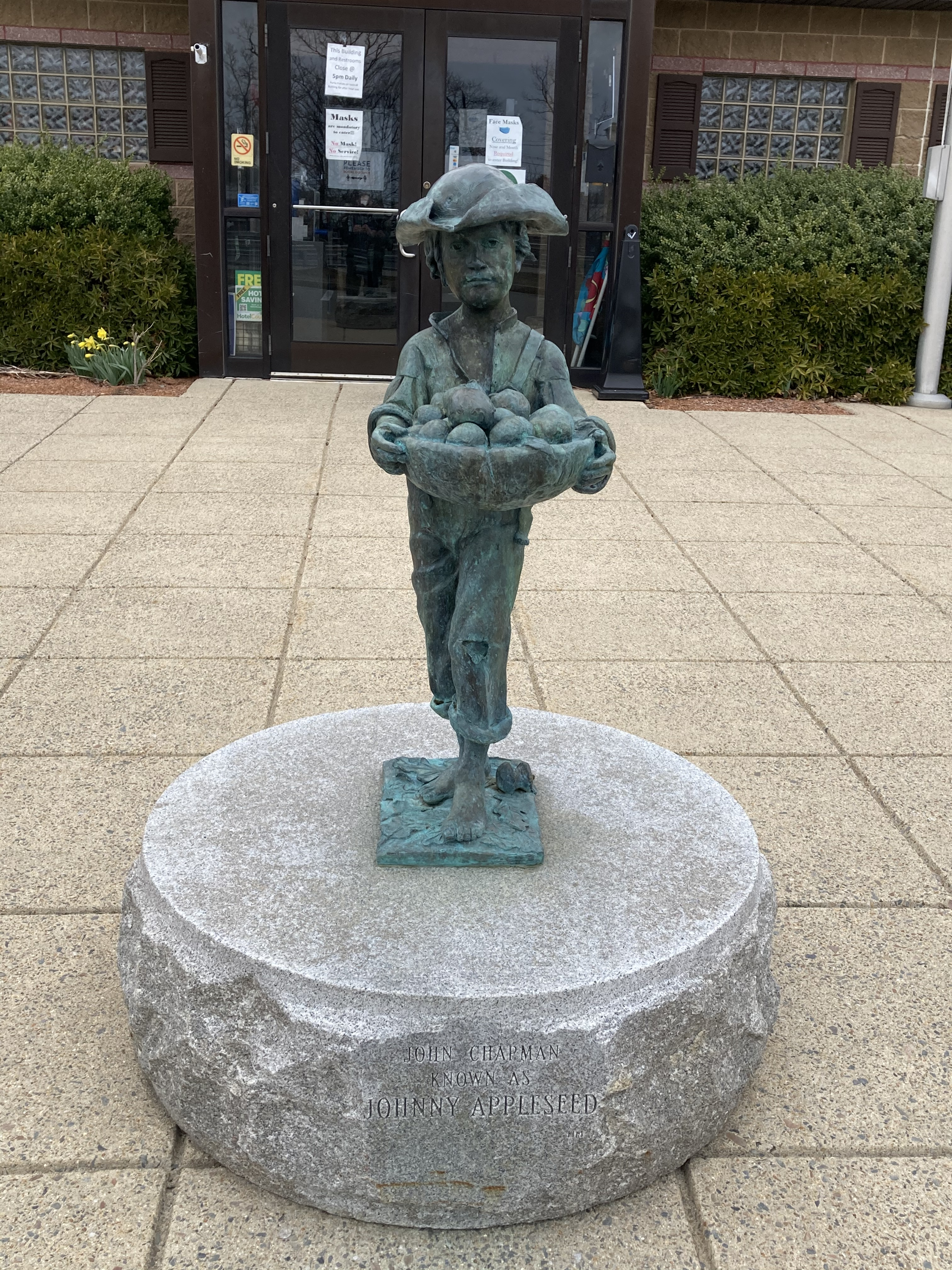
Statue of Johnny Appleseed welcoming travelers to the Johnny Appleseed Visitor and Information Center on Ma Hwy Rt 2 in Lancaster, Mass., near the birthplace of Johnny Appleseed.

== Hard cider ==
Chapman planted his apples by seed, not grafting, but without grafting, only about one in 100 seedlings will yield an apple that is edible as a fruit. According to Henry David Thoreau, an apple grown from seed tastes "sour enough to set a squirrel's teeth on edge and make a jay scream." But apples from seed are perfectly fine for making hard cider, and in the early part of the 19th century, there was a demand for hard cider—Ohioans ages 15 and over drank, on average, 30 gallons (113.5 l) of hard cider per year (10.52 ounces, ca. 300 ml, per day). Author Michael Pollan believes that since Chapman was against grafting and thus virtually all his apples were not edible and could be used only for cider: "Really, what Johnny Appleseed was doing and the reason he was welcome in every cabin in Ohio and Indiana was he was bringing the gift of alcohol to the frontier. He was our American Dionysus."

== See also ==
- Melody Time
- Folk hero
- The Man Who Planted Trees
- Seed bombing
- Silviculture
- Tree planting
