= Black Fork Mohican River =

River in Ashland and Richland counties in Ohio, United States

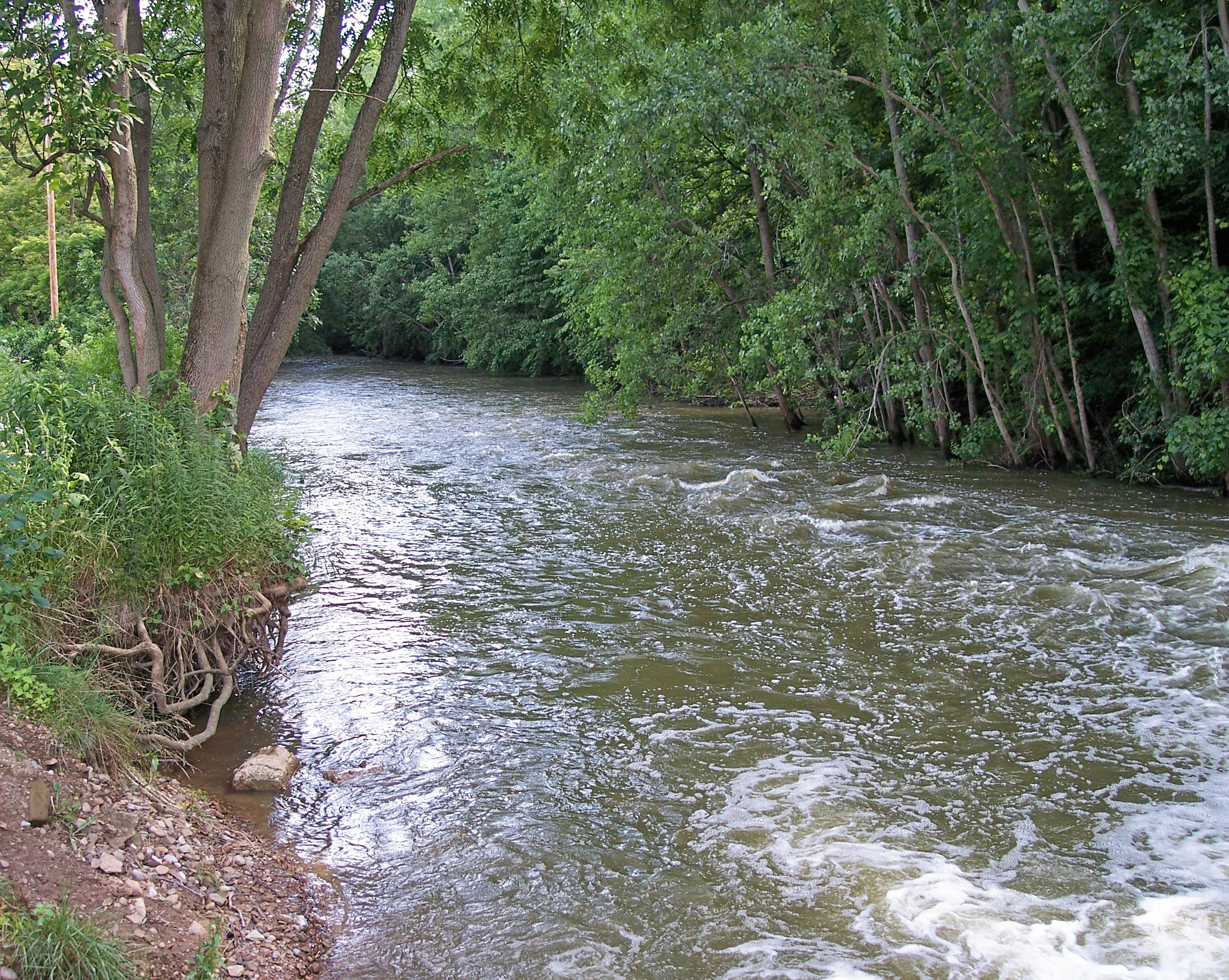
- The Black Fork downstream of the dam of Charles Mill Lake in Ashland County, Ohio

Location
- Country: United States

Physical characteristics
- Source
  - location: Richland County, Ohio
  - coordinates: 40°47′18″N 82°36′20″W
- Mouth
  - location: near Loudonville, Ohio
  - coordinates: 40°36′30″N 82°15′14″W
- Length: 58.4 mi (94.0 km)
- Basin size: 351 mi^{2} (910 km^{2})
- Discharge
  - location: Loudonville
  - average: 427 cu ft/s (12.1 m^{3}/s)

The Black Fork is a principal tributary of the Mohican River, 58.4 miles (94.0 km) long, in north-central Ohio in the United States.

== Description ==
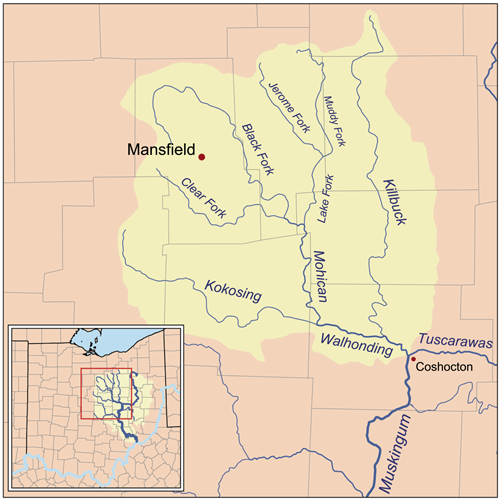
Map of the Walhonding watershed showing the Black Fork Mohican River

Via the Mohican, Walhonding, Muskingum and Ohio Rivers, it is part of the watershed of the Mississippi River, draining an area of 351 square miles (910 km^{2}). According to the Geographic Names Information System, it has also been known historically as "Armstrongs Creek" and "Black Fork Creek".

The Black Fork rises about 7 miles (11 km) west of Mansfield in Richland County, and initially flows northward through the city of Shelby, then eastward across northern Richland County before turning southeast for the remainder of its course through eastern Richland and southern Ashland Counties, past the towns of Perrysville and Loudonville. It joins the Clear Fork in Ashland County to form the Mohican River, about 2 miles (3.2 km) southwest of Loudonville.

A U.S. Army Corps of Engineers dam in Ashland County, completed in 1936, causes the Black Fork to form Charles Mill Lake.

== See also ==
- List of rivers of Ohio
- Ohio River flood of 1937
