= Perrysville, Ohio =

Village in Ashland County, Ohio, United States

- Village
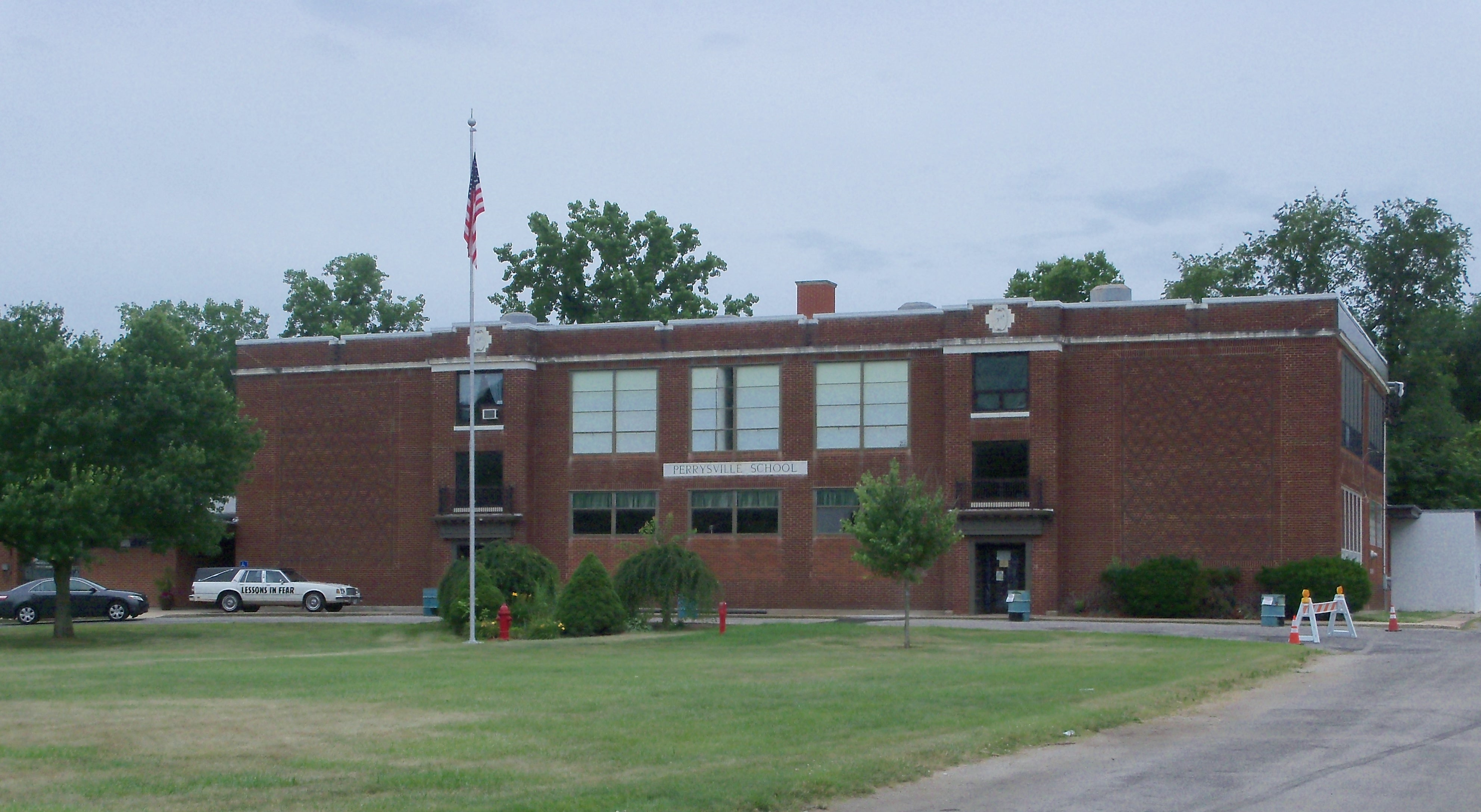
- Perrysville School (1924)

- Logo

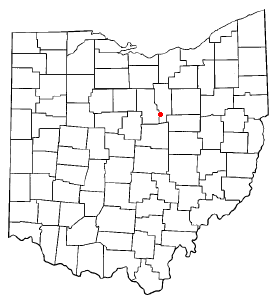
- Location of Perrysville, Ohio

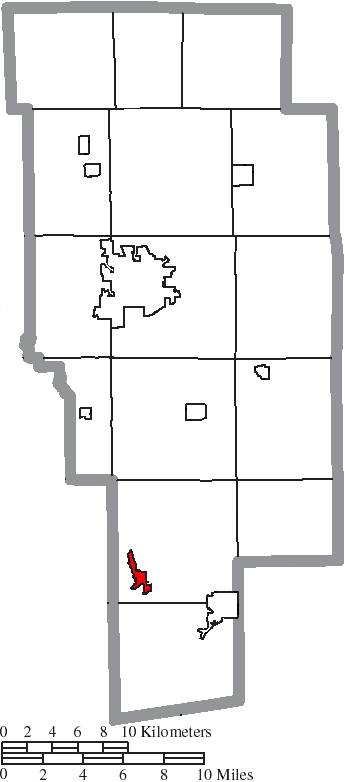
- Location of Perrysville in Ashland County
- Coordinates: 40°39′30″N 82°18′52″W
- Country: United States
- State: Ohio
- County: Ashland
- Township: Green

Area
  - Total: 0.79 sq mi (2.05 km^{2})
  - Land: 0.79 sq mi (2.05 km^{2})
  - Water: 0 sq mi (0.00 km^{2})
- Elevation: 978 ft (298 m)

Population (2020)
  - Total: 729
  - Density: 922.4/sq mi (356.15/km^{2})
- Time zone: UTC-5 (Eastern (EST))
  - Summer (DST): UTC-4 (EDT)
- ZIP code: 44864
- Area code: 419
- FIPS code: 39-62190
- GNIS feature ID: 2399657
- Website: www.villageofperrysville.com

Perrysville is a village in Green Township, Ashland County, Ohio, United States. The population was 729 at the 2020 census.

== History ==
The area was first permanently settled in 1810, but the village was not laid out until 1812. One of the settlers, Judge Coulter, picked the most beautiful spot for a village with the intentions of laying out a village, and although he had no name planned his neighbors jokingly called it "Coulterville." Perrysville was originally called Freeport, and under the latter name was laid out in 1815. The present name honors Oliver Hazard Perry, remembered for leading American forces in a decisive naval victory at the Battle of Lake Erie. A post office called Perryville was established in 1820, and the name was changed to Perrysville in 1883.

== Geography ==
Perrysville is located along the Black Fork of the Mohican River.

According to the United States Census Bureau, the village has a total area of 0.79 square miles (2.05 km^{2}), all land. The village is the third largest municipality in the county after Ashland and Loudonville.

The Black Fork of the Mohican River passes the southwestern edge of the village.

Perrysville is roughly 30 miles from the cities of Mansfield, Ashland, Wooster, and Mt. Vernon. Nearby attractions include Mohican Forest, Pleasant Hill Lake, Malabar Farm, and St. Gregory Palamas Monastery.

The geography of the area, especially the multiple branches forming the Mohican River, make Perrysville and neighboring Loudonville premier locations for camping, canoeing, and eco-tourism.

== Demographics ==
Historical population
Census	Pop.	Note	%±
1880	476		—
1890	522		9.7%
1900	513		−1.7%
1910	541		5.5%
1920	575		6.3%
1930	615		7.0%
1940	728		18.4%
1950	674		−7.4%
1960	769		14.1%
1970	752		−2.2%
1980	836		11.2%
1990	691		−17.3%
2000	816		18.1%
2010	735		−9.9%
2020	729		−0.8%

=== 2010 census ===
As of the census of 2010, there were 735 people, 326 households, and 186 families residing in the village. The population density was 930.4 inhabitants per square mile (359.2/km^{2}). There were 372 housing units at an average density of 470.9 per square mile (181.8/km^{2}). The racial makeup of the village was 97.3% White, 0.3% African American, 0.1% Native American, 0.4% Asian, 0.7% from other races, and 1.2% from two or more races. Hispanic or Latino of any race were 1.5% of the population.

There were 326 households, of which 28.8% had children under the age of 18 living with them, 40.8% were married couples living together, 12.3% had a female householder with no husband present, 4.0% had a male householder with no wife present, and 42.9% were non-families. 36.8% of all households were made up of individuals, and 14.4% had someone living alone who was 65 years of age or older. The average household size was 2.25 and the average family size was 2.98.

The median age in the village was 37.8 years. 24.6% of residents were under the age of 18; 9.3% were between the ages of 18 and 24; 24.7% were from 25 to 44; 27.1% were from 45 to 64; and 14.3% were 65 years of age or older. The gender makeup of the village was 48.8% male and 51.2% female.

=== 2000 census ===
As of the census of 2000, there were 816 people, 329 households, and 231 families residing in the village. The population density was 1,052.1 inhabitants per square mile (406.2/km^{2}). There were 356 housing units at an average density of 459.0 per square mile (177.2/km^{2}). The racial makeup of the village was 98.53% White, 0.49% African American, 0.12% Pacific Islander, 0.25% from other races, and 0.61% from two or more races. Hispanic or Latino of any race were 0.37% of the population.

There were 329 households, out of which 37.4% had children under the age of 18 living with them, 50.2% were married couples living together, 11.6% had a female householder with no husband present, and 29.5% were non-families. 26.4% of all households were made up of individuals, and 13.4% had someone living alone who was 65 years of age or older. The average household size was 2.48 and the average family size was 2.97.

In the village, the population was spread out, with 29.4% under the age of 18, 9.8% from 18 to 24, 27.8% from 25 to 44, 19.7% from 45 to 64, and 13.2% who were 65 years of age or older. The median age was 33 years. For every 100 females there were 91.5 males. For every 100 females age 18 and over, there were 91.4 males.

The median income for a household in the village was $29,408, and the median income for a family was $35,781. Males had a median income of $27,031 versus $20,208 for females. The per capita income for the village was $12,603. About 14.9% of families and 18.3% of the population were below the poverty line, including 26.4% of those under age 18 and 8.1% of those age 65 or over.

== Education ==
Perrysville is part of the Loudonville-Perrysville Exempted Village School District and was home to Perrysville Junior High until 2012, when the school was closed and the school merged with Loudonville High School.

Public schooling in Perrysville began in 1816 with the construction of the first schoolhouse, taught by Asa Brown on what was then a farm. For the previous two years, education had been offered in private homes by Betsy Rice Coulter and then by William Maxwell Adolphus Johnson. During this time, school was taught only during the summer because of transportation limitations.

On November 14, 1865, an academy opened in Perrysville. At the time, academies served as a popular source of higher learning that was a step above traditional public schooling but a step below formal colleges. This school, located in what is now a Presbyterian church, taught a class of 45 enrolled students, although only 11 attended. In 1869 a separate building was built for the academy, and it operated there for twenty-six years. In 1895, the building burned down, and Greentown Academy never re-opened.

The second Perrysville schoolhouse was built in 1871 on West Third Street. The building later housed Jones Piano and a cigar factory. Eleven years later, in 1882, the third schoolhouse was built down the street from the second one.

Built in 1924, the fourth and last schoolhouse stood for many years. When it was built, students from schools all over Green Township left those schools to attend Perrysville High School. The building was remodeled in 1955. The school colors were red and white and the mascot was an Admiral in honor of the town's namesake, Oliver Hazard Perry. The school was successful in athletics, with seven notable teams between 1926 and 1952 - one women's basketball team, four men's basketball teams, a men's baseball team, and a men's football team.

The town continued to operate independent schools for 145 years until it merged with the Loudonville, Ohio school district in 1961. In 1961, the last class graduated from Perrysville High School. At this time, the Loudonville and Perrysville schools merged into the Loudonville-Perrysville Exempted Village School District in order to prevent the schools from closing down permanently. In 1988, what had been Perrysville High School became Perrysville Junior High. The current Perrysville Junior High School served as the home of grades K-12. Perrysville School District competed in a variety of varsity sports, including football, with the mascot of "The Admirals", an homage to the town's namesake Commodore Perry.

== Notable people ==
- Rosella Rice, author, poet and lecturer
- Jedediah Smith, explorer

== See also ==
- List of municipalities in Ohio
