= Mohican River =

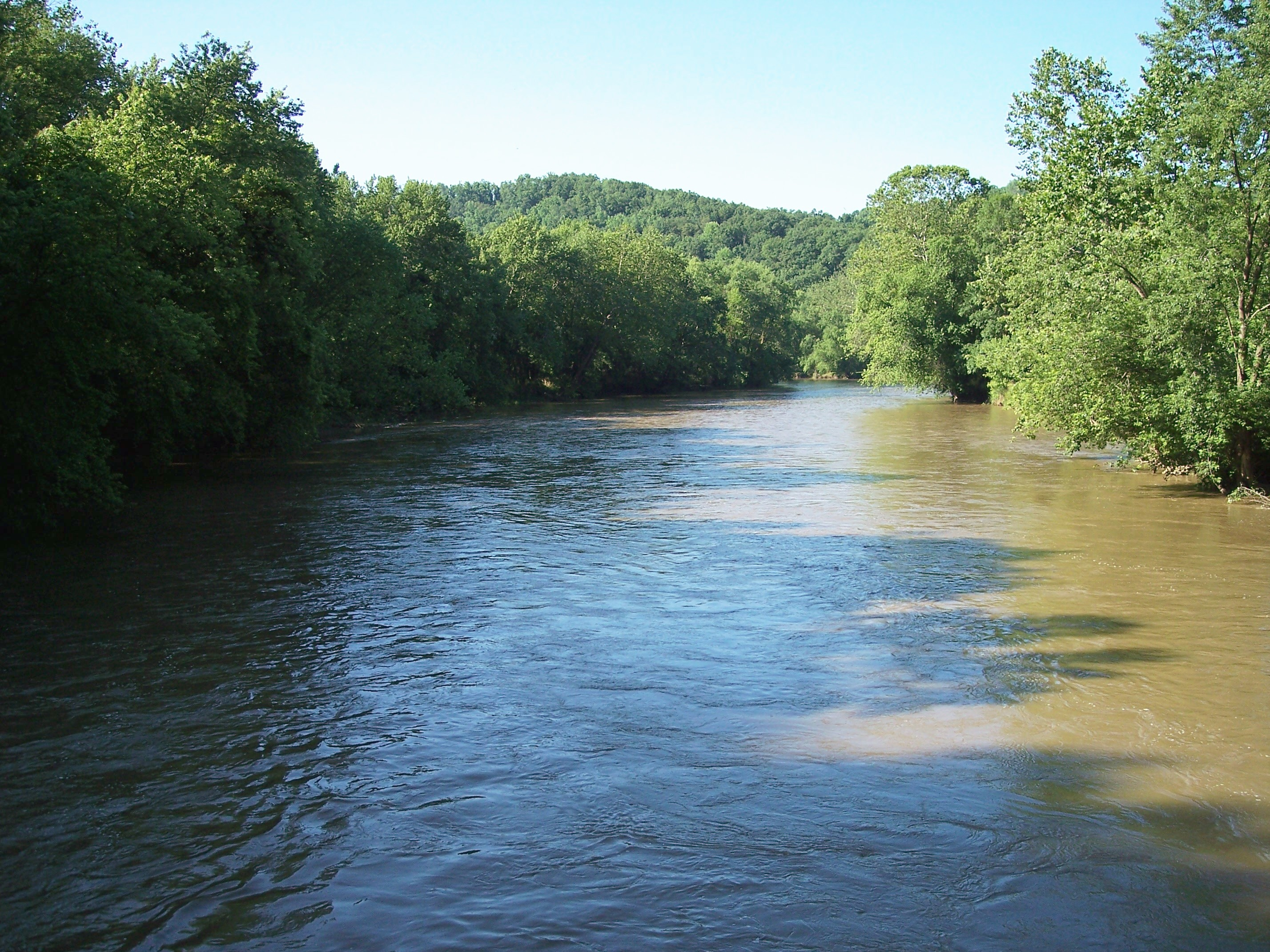
- The Mohican River in northwestern Coshocton County, Ohio

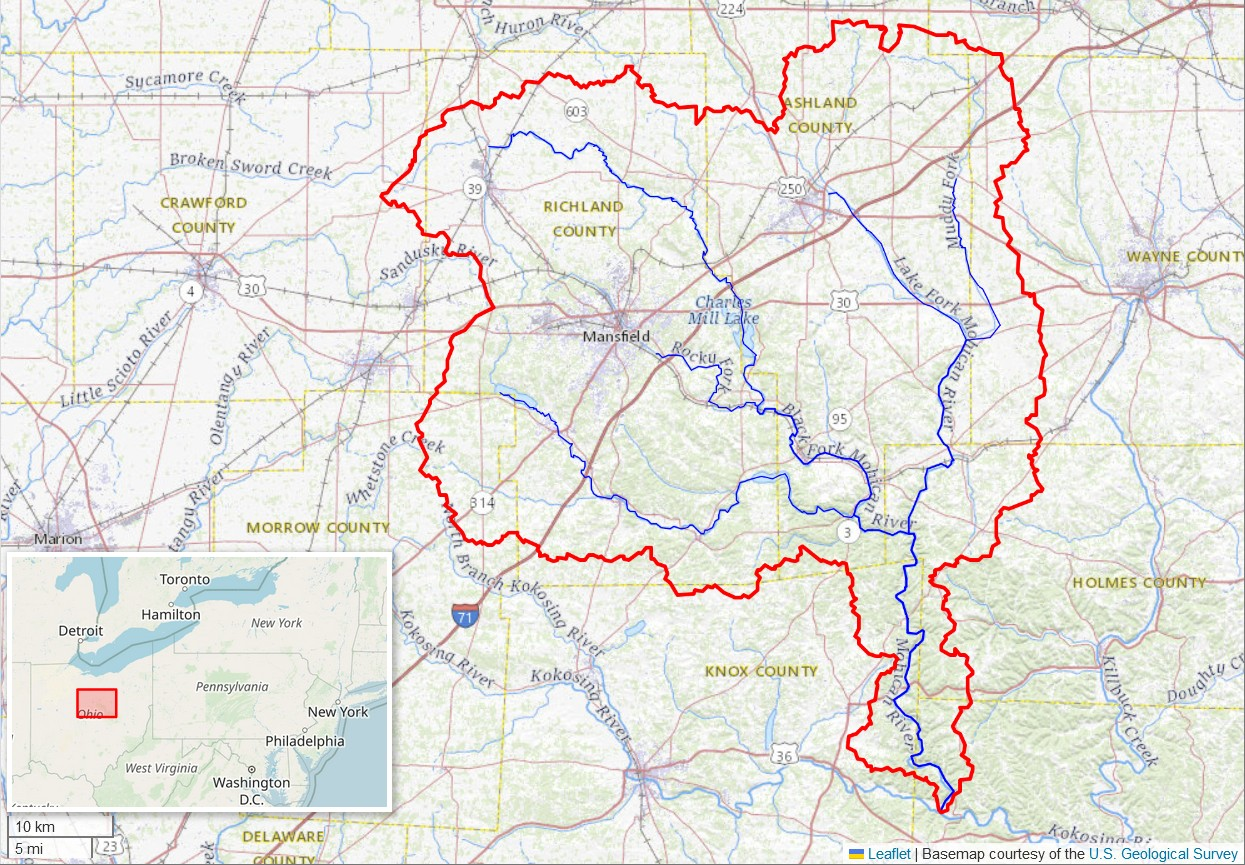
- Mohican River watershed (Interactive map)

Location
- Country: United States

Physical characteristics
- Source
  - location: confluence of Black and Clear Forks near Loudonville
  - coordinates: 40°36′29″N 82°15′14″W
- Mouth
  - location: Walhonding River, northwestern Coshocton County
  - coordinates: 40°21′36″N 82°09′37″W
- Length: approximately 40 mi (64 km)
- Basin size: 999 sq mi (2,590 km^{2})
- Discharge
  - location: Greer
  - average: 910.1 cu ft/s (25.77 m^{3}/s), USGS water years 1922-1981
- Discharge
  - location: mouth
  - average: 1,138.63 cu ft/s (32.242 m^{3}/s) (estimate)

Basin features
- Tributaries
  - left: Lake Fork Mohican River, North Fork Mohican River

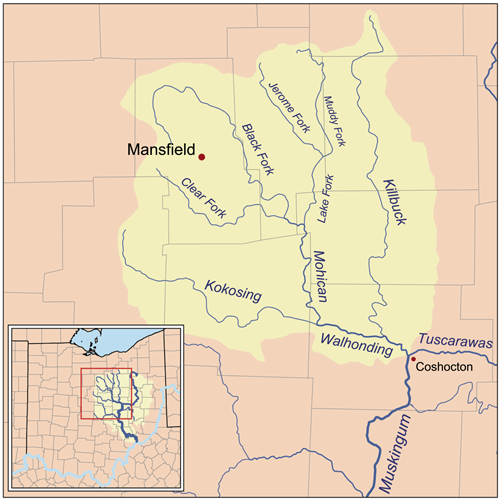
Map of the Walhonding watershed showing the Mohican River and its tributaries

The Mohican River is a principal tributary of the Walhonding River, about 40 miles (64 km) long, in north-central Ohio in the United States. Via the Walhonding, Muskingum and Ohio Rivers, it is part of the watershed of the Mississippi River, draining an area of 999 square miles (2,590 km^{2}).

The Mohican River is formed in Ashland County, about 2 miles (3.2 km) southwest of Loudonville, by the confluence of the Black Fork and the Clear Fork. It then flows generally south-southeast through western Holmes and northeastern Knox Counties, past the community of Brinkhaven, into northwestern Coshocton County, where it joins the Kokosing River to form the Walhonding River. It collects the Lake Fork in Holmes County.

Near Brinkhaven the river is spanned by the Bridge of Dreams, the second longest covered bridge in Ohio.

== Variant names and spellings ==
The river was named after the Mohican Indian tribe. According to the Geographic Names Information System, the Mohican River has also been known historically as:

- Margrets Creek
- Mohecan Creek
- Mohiccan Creek
- Mohiccan John Creek
- Mohiccon Creek
- Mohickan Creek
- Mohickin Johns River

== See also ==
- List of rivers of Ohio
