= List of minor planets: 417001–418000 =

The following is a partial list of minor planets, running from minor-planet number 417001 through 418000, inclusive. The primary data for this and other partial lists is based on JPL's "Small-Body Orbital Elements" and data available from the Minor Planet Center. Critical list information is also provided by the MPC, unless otherwise specified from Lowell Observatory. A detailed description of the table's columns and additional sources are given on the main page including a complete list of every page in this series, and a statistical break-up on the dynamical classification of minor planets.

Also see the summary list of all named bodies in numerical and alphabetical order, and the corresponding naming citations for the number range of this particular list. New namings may only be added to this list after official publication, as the preannouncement of names is condemned by the Working Group for Small Bodies Nomenclature of the International Astronomical Union.

Near-Earth obj.	MBA (inner)	MBA (outer)	Centaur
Mars-crosser	MBA (middle)	Jupiter trojan	Trans-Neptunian obj.
Unclassified

== 417001–417100 ==
Designation			Discovery			Properties		Ref
Permanent	Provisional	Named after	Date	Site	Discoverer(s)	Category	Diam.	Ref
417001	2005 TT_{179}	—	October 6, 2005	Anderson Mesa	LONEOS	EUN	1.3 km	MPC · JPL
417002	2005 TY_{186}	—	September 24, 2005	Kitt Peak	Spacewatch	·	1.7 km	MPC · JPL
417003	2005 TD_{189}	—	October 13, 2005	Kitt Peak	Spacewatch	·	1.1 km	MPC · JPL
417004	2005 TS_{191}	—	October 1, 2005	Mount Lemmon	Mount Lemmon Survey	·	1.8 km	MPC · JPL
417005	2005 UL_{4}	—	October 23, 2005	Catalina	CSS	·	2.3 km	MPC · JPL
417006	2005 UV_{5}	—	October 25, 2005	Socorro	LINEAR	·	2.8 km	MPC · JPL
417007	2005 UX_{7}	—	August 30, 2005	Socorro	LINEAR	·	1.8 km	MPC · JPL
417008	2005 UV_{17}	—	October 22, 2005	Kitt Peak	Spacewatch	·	1.9 km	MPC · JPL
417009	2005 UU_{23}	—	October 23, 2005	Kitt Peak	Spacewatch	·	1.8 km	MPC · JPL
417010	2005 UE_{41}	—	October 24, 2005	Kitt Peak	Spacewatch	·	1.7 km	MPC · JPL
417011	2005 UF_{41}	—	October 25, 2005	Kitt Peak	Spacewatch	·	1.7 km	MPC · JPL
417012	2005 UG_{41}	—	October 24, 2005	Kitt Peak	Spacewatch	HOF	2.5 km	MPC · JPL
417013	2005 UO_{44}	—	October 22, 2005	Kitt Peak	Spacewatch	·	2.9 km	MPC · JPL
417014	2005 UP_{44}	—	October 22, 2005	Kitt Peak	Spacewatch	·	1.6 km	MPC · JPL
417015	2005 UW_{46}	—	October 22, 2005	Kitt Peak	Spacewatch	·	1.7 km	MPC · JPL
417016	2005 UG_{49}	—	October 1, 2005	Mount Lemmon	Mount Lemmon Survey	·	2.4 km	MPC · JPL
417017	2005 UJ_{54}	—	October 23, 2005	Catalina	CSS	·	1.5 km	MPC · JPL
417018	2005 UH_{58}	—	October 24, 2005	Kitt Peak	Spacewatch	·	1.3 km	MPC · JPL
417019	2005 UV_{59}	—	October 25, 2005	Anderson Mesa	LONEOS	·	1.7 km	MPC · JPL
417020	2005 UX_{64}	—	October 29, 2005	Wrightwood	J. W. Young	·	1.7 km	MPC · JPL
417021	2005 UU_{68}	—	October 23, 2005	Palomar	NEAT	·	1.9 km	MPC · JPL
417022	2005 UY_{80}	—	October 25, 2005	Mount Lemmon	Mount Lemmon Survey	·	2.5 km	MPC · JPL
417023	2005 UK_{82}	—	October 22, 2005	Kitt Peak	Spacewatch	(7744)	1.2 km	MPC · JPL
417024	2005 UH_{83}	—	October 22, 2005	Kitt Peak	Spacewatch	·	1.6 km	MPC · JPL
417025	2005 UQ_{84}	—	October 22, 2005	Kitt Peak	Spacewatch	·	1.3 km	MPC · JPL
417026	2005 UV_{85}	—	October 22, 2005	Kitt Peak	Spacewatch	MIS	2.2 km	MPC · JPL
417027	2005 UM_{88}	—	October 22, 2005	Kitt Peak	Spacewatch	WIT	1.0 km	MPC · JPL
417028	2005 UZ_{89}	—	October 22, 2005	Kitt Peak	Spacewatch	·	1.5 km	MPC · JPL
417029	2005 UV_{90}	—	March 26, 2003	Anderson Mesa	LONEOS	GEF	1.7 km	MPC · JPL
417030	2005 UH_{91}	—	October 22, 2005	Kitt Peak	Spacewatch	·	1.6 km	MPC · JPL
417031	2005 UB_{98}	—	October 22, 2005	Kitt Peak	Spacewatch	·	1.5 km	MPC · JPL
417032	2005 UL_{99}	—	October 22, 2005	Kitt Peak	Spacewatch	AGN	1.3 km	MPC · JPL
417033	2005 UH_{106}	—	October 22, 2005	Kitt Peak	Spacewatch	·	1.8 km	MPC · JPL
417034	2005 UM_{106}	—	October 22, 2005	Kitt Peak	Spacewatch	EUN	1.4 km	MPC · JPL
417035	2005 UK_{108}	—	October 22, 2005	Kitt Peak	Spacewatch	·	1.5 km	MPC · JPL
417036	2005 UQ_{111}	—	October 22, 2005	Kitt Peak	Spacewatch	·	2.1 km	MPC · JPL
417037	2005 UT_{114}	—	October 22, 2005	Palomar	NEAT	·	1.7 km	MPC · JPL
417038	2005 UD_{115}	—	October 23, 2005	Palomar	NEAT	·	1.8 km	MPC · JPL
417039	2005 UV_{115}	—	October 23, 2005	Catalina	CSS	·	1.7 km	MPC · JPL
417040	2005 UN_{117}	—	October 5, 2005	Kitt Peak	Spacewatch	·	1.4 km	MPC · JPL
417041	2005 UX_{118}	—	October 24, 2005	Kitt Peak	Spacewatch	·	1.3 km	MPC · JPL
417042	2005 UL_{122}	—	October 24, 2005	Kitt Peak	Spacewatch	·	2.4 km	MPC · JPL
417043	2005 UE_{126}	—	October 24, 2005	Kitt Peak	Spacewatch	·	1.6 km	MPC · JPL
417044	2005 UY_{127}	—	October 24, 2005	Kitt Peak	Spacewatch	·	1.2 km	MPC · JPL
417045	2005 UW_{129}	—	October 24, 2005	Kitt Peak	Spacewatch	·	2.1 km	MPC · JPL
417046	2005 UR_{140}	—	October 25, 2005	Mount Lemmon	Mount Lemmon Survey	·	1.3 km	MPC · JPL
417047	2005 UO_{154}	—	October 26, 2005	Kitt Peak	Spacewatch	·	1.2 km	MPC · JPL
417048	2005 UJ_{156}	—	October 26, 2005	Palomar	NEAT	·	2.3 km	MPC · JPL
417049	2005 UG_{158}	—	October 1, 2005	Mount Lemmon	Mount Lemmon Survey	·	2.2 km	MPC · JPL
417050	2005 UG_{161}	—	October 22, 2005	Palomar	NEAT	·	1.7 km	MPC · JPL
417051	2005 UB_{166}	—	October 12, 2005	Kitt Peak	Spacewatch	·	1.4 km	MPC · JPL
417052	2005 UL_{181}	—	October 24, 2005	Kitt Peak	Spacewatch	ADE	2.9 km	MPC · JPL
417053	2005 UO_{182}	—	October 24, 2005	Kitt Peak	Spacewatch	·	1.4 km	MPC · JPL
417054	2005 UB_{183}	—	October 24, 2005	Kitt Peak	Spacewatch	·	1.9 km	MPC · JPL
417055	2005 UP_{184}	—	October 25, 2005	Mount Lemmon	Mount Lemmon Survey	·	1.4 km	MPC · JPL
417056	2005 US_{187}	—	October 27, 2005	Kitt Peak	Spacewatch	·	1.9 km	MPC · JPL
417057	2005 UG_{194}	—	October 22, 2005	Kitt Peak	Spacewatch	·	1.4 km	MPC · JPL
417058	2005 UA_{195}	—	October 22, 2005	Kitt Peak	Spacewatch	PAD	1.5 km	MPC · JPL
417059	2005 UL_{202}	—	October 25, 2005	Kitt Peak	Spacewatch	·	2.0 km	MPC · JPL
417060	2005 UP_{205}	—	October 26, 2005	Kitt Peak	Spacewatch	MRX	980 m	MPC · JPL
417061	2005 UK_{210}	—	October 27, 2005	Mount Lemmon	Mount Lemmon Survey	·	1.8 km	MPC · JPL
417062	2005 UM_{212}	—	October 27, 2005	Kitt Peak	Spacewatch	AGN	1.1 km	MPC · JPL
417063	2005 UH_{218}	—	October 25, 2005	Kitt Peak	Spacewatch	·	1.7 km	MPC · JPL
417064	2005 UK_{219}	—	October 25, 2005	Kitt Peak	Spacewatch	·	2.1 km	MPC · JPL
417065	2005 UQ_{219}	—	October 25, 2005	Kitt Peak	Spacewatch	NEM	2.1 km	MPC · JPL
417066	2005 UP_{222}	—	October 25, 2005	Kitt Peak	Spacewatch	·	1.5 km	MPC · JPL
417067	2005 US_{225}	—	October 25, 2005	Kitt Peak	Spacewatch	·	1.9 km	MPC · JPL
417068	2005 UW_{227}	—	October 25, 2005	Kitt Peak	Spacewatch	·	1.4 km	MPC · JPL
417069	2005 UX_{227}	—	October 25, 2005	Kitt Peak	Spacewatch	·	1.6 km	MPC · JPL
417070	2005 UM_{228}	—	October 25, 2005	Kitt Peak	Spacewatch	·	1.3 km	MPC · JPL
417071	2005 UX_{229}	—	February 9, 2002	Kitt Peak	Spacewatch	·	1.3 km	MPC · JPL
417072	2005 UN_{232}	—	October 25, 2005	Mount Lemmon	Mount Lemmon Survey	·	1.4 km	MPC · JPL
417073	2005 UZ_{239}	—	October 25, 2005	Kitt Peak	Spacewatch	·	2.3 km	MPC · JPL
417074	2005 UT_{240}	—	October 25, 2005	Kitt Peak	Spacewatch	·	2.0 km	MPC · JPL
417075	2005 UT_{242}	—	October 25, 2005	Kitt Peak	Spacewatch	EUN	1.3 km	MPC · JPL
417076	2005 UD_{244}	—	October 25, 2005	Kitt Peak	Spacewatch	·	1.7 km	MPC · JPL
417077	2005 UO_{247}	—	October 28, 2005	Kitt Peak	Spacewatch	·	2.1 km	MPC · JPL
417078	2005 UQ_{251}	—	October 24, 2005	Kitt Peak	Spacewatch	·	2.4 km	MPC · JPL
417079	2005 UU_{257}	—	October 25, 2005	Kitt Peak	Spacewatch	WIT	1.1 km	MPC · JPL
417080	2005 UF_{258}	—	October 25, 2005	Kitt Peak	Spacewatch	·	1.2 km	MPC · JPL
417081	2005 UM_{260}	—	October 25, 2005	Kitt Peak	Spacewatch	·	1.6 km	MPC · JPL
417082	2005 UN_{261}	—	October 1, 2005	Kitt Peak	Spacewatch	·	1.3 km	MPC · JPL
417083	2005 UY_{263}	—	March 26, 2003	Kitt Peak	Spacewatch	·	1.5 km	MPC · JPL
417084	2005 UZ_{267}	—	October 27, 2005	Mount Lemmon	Mount Lemmon Survey	·	1.9 km	MPC · JPL
417085	2005 UC_{274}	—	October 24, 2005	Palomar	NEAT	EUN	1.3 km	MPC · JPL
417086	2005 UE_{291}	—	October 26, 2005	Kitt Peak	Spacewatch	·	2.0 km	MPC · JPL
417087	2005 UC_{293}	—	October 26, 2005	Kitt Peak	Spacewatch	AGN	1.2 km	MPC · JPL
417088	2005 UZ_{296}	—	October 26, 2005	Kitt Peak	Spacewatch	·	2.2 km	MPC · JPL
417089	2005 UK_{299}	—	October 26, 2005	Kitt Peak	Spacewatch	·	1.4 km	MPC · JPL
417090	2005 UQ_{303}	—	October 26, 2005	Kitt Peak	Spacewatch	·	1.6 km	MPC · JPL
417091	2005 UP_{306}	—	October 27, 2005	Mount Lemmon	Mount Lemmon Survey	·	1.7 km	MPC · JPL
417092	2005 UA_{309}	—	September 25, 2005	Kitt Peak	Spacewatch	(29841)	1.1 km	MPC · JPL
417093	2005 UE_{309}	—	October 28, 2005	Socorro	LINEAR	·	1.3 km	MPC · JPL
417094	2005 UV_{318}	—	October 27, 2005	Kitt Peak	Spacewatch	·	1.4 km	MPC · JPL
417095	2005 UZ_{331}	—	October 25, 2005	Kitt Peak	Spacewatch	NEM	2.4 km	MPC · JPL
417096	2005 UJ_{338}	—	October 31, 2005	Kitt Peak	Spacewatch	·	1.2 km	MPC · JPL
417097	2005 UC_{347}	—	October 30, 2005	Kitt Peak	Spacewatch	·	1.4 km	MPC · JPL
417098	2005 UV_{358}	—	October 24, 2005	Kitt Peak	Spacewatch	(1547)	1.4 km	MPC · JPL
417099	2005 UE_{360}	—	October 25, 2005	Mount Lemmon	Mount Lemmon Survey	·	1.3 km	MPC · JPL
417100	2005 UU_{372}	—	October 27, 2005	Kitt Peak	Spacewatch	·	1.7 km	MPC · JPL

== 417101–417200 ==
back to top

Designation			Discovery			Properties		Ref
Permanent	Provisional	Named after	Date	Site	Discoverer(s)	Category	Diam.	Ref
417101	2005 UC_{373}	—	October 27, 2005	Kitt Peak	Spacewatch	·	1.4 km	MPC · JPL
417102	2005 UH_{380}	—	September 30, 2005	Mount Lemmon	Mount Lemmon Survey	(1547)	1.2 km	MPC · JPL
417103	2005 UC_{383}	—	October 27, 2005	Kitt Peak	Spacewatch	·	1.7 km	MPC · JPL
417104	2005 UV_{383}	—	October 1, 2005	Anderson Mesa	LONEOS	ADE	2.2 km	MPC · JPL
417105	2005 UC_{392}	—	October 30, 2005	Kitt Peak	Spacewatch	HOF	2.3 km	MPC · JPL
417106	2005 UW_{392}	—	October 30, 2005	Mount Lemmon	Mount Lemmon Survey	·	1.8 km	MPC · JPL
417107	2005 UD_{396}	—	October 24, 2005	Kitt Peak	Spacewatch	EUN	1.5 km	MPC · JPL
417108	2005 UX_{425}	—	October 28, 2005	Kitt Peak	Spacewatch	·	2.0 km	MPC · JPL
417109	2005 UJ_{428}	—	October 28, 2005	Kitt Peak	Spacewatch	·	1.6 km	MPC · JPL
417110	2005 UN_{428}	—	October 28, 2005	Kitt Peak	Spacewatch	·	1.8 km	MPC · JPL
417111	2005 UM_{439}	—	October 29, 2005	Kitt Peak	Spacewatch	·	1.5 km	MPC · JPL
417112	2005 UT_{439}	—	October 1, 2005	Catalina	CSS	·	2.1 km	MPC · JPL
417113	2005 UR_{449}	—	October 30, 2005	Kitt Peak	Spacewatch	·	1.8 km	MPC · JPL
417114	2005 UT_{452}	—	October 29, 2005	Kitt Peak	Spacewatch	NEM	2.0 km	MPC · JPL
417115	2005 UH_{477}	—	October 25, 2005	Mount Lemmon	Mount Lemmon Survey	·	1.5 km	MPC · JPL
417116	2005 UF_{487}	—	September 3, 2005	Palomar	NEAT	·	1.6 km	MPC · JPL
417117	2005 UW_{489}	—	October 10, 2005	Catalina	CSS	·	1.6 km	MPC · JPL
417118	2005 UD_{490}	—	October 23, 2005	Catalina	CSS	·	2.4 km	MPC · JPL
417119	2005 UB_{496}	—	October 26, 2005	Anderson Mesa	LONEOS	·	2.0 km	MPC · JPL
417120	2005 UO_{497}	—	October 5, 2005	Catalina	CSS	·	1.8 km	MPC · JPL
417121	2005 UO_{498}	—	October 27, 2005	Catalina	CSS	EUN	1.5 km	MPC · JPL
417122	2005 UK_{501}	—	October 27, 2005	Catalina	CSS	(18466)	2.4 km	MPC · JPL
417123	2005 UM_{509}	—	September 3, 2005	Palomar	NEAT	·	1.5 km	MPC · JPL
417124	2005 UR_{512}	—	October 30, 2005	Mount Lemmon	Mount Lemmon Survey	EUN	1.6 km	MPC · JPL
417125	2005 UT_{512}	—	October 31, 2005	Catalina	CSS	ADE · slow	2.3 km	MPC · JPL
417126	2005 UT_{525}	—	October 25, 2005	Mount Lemmon	Mount Lemmon Survey	·	2.1 km	MPC · JPL
417127	2005 UP_{526}	—	October 25, 2005	Kitt Peak	Spacewatch	·	2.2 km	MPC · JPL
417128	2005 UC_{527}	—	October 27, 2005	Mount Lemmon	Mount Lemmon Survey	·	1.2 km	MPC · JPL
417129	2005 VG	—	November 2, 2005	Cordell-Lorenz	D. T. Durig	EUN	1.3 km	MPC · JPL
417130	2005 VO_{4}	—	November 7, 2005	Ottmarsheim	C. Rinner	·	2.0 km	MPC · JPL
417131	2005 VE_{24}	—	November 1, 2005	Kitt Peak	Spacewatch	·	1.3 km	MPC · JPL
417132	2005 VW_{25}	—	November 2, 2005	Mount Lemmon	Mount Lemmon Survey	·	1.9 km	MPC · JPL
417133	2005 VN_{38}	—	November 3, 2005	Mount Lemmon	Mount Lemmon Survey	HOF	2.7 km	MPC · JPL
417134	2005 VX_{43}	—	November 3, 2005	Kitt Peak	Spacewatch	·	1.1 km	MPC · JPL
417135	2005 VE_{50}	—	October 25, 2005	Kitt Peak	Spacewatch	·	1.5 km	MPC · JPL
417136	2005 VM_{58}	—	November 5, 2005	Kitt Peak	Spacewatch	·	1.8 km	MPC · JPL
417137	2005 VF_{70}	—	November 5, 2005	Mount Lemmon	Mount Lemmon Survey	HOF	2.3 km	MPC · JPL
417138	2005 VY_{73}	—	November 1, 2005	Mount Lemmon	Mount Lemmon Survey	·	2.7 km	MPC · JPL
417139	2005 VM_{74}	—	November 1, 2005	Mount Lemmon	Mount Lemmon Survey	ADE	2.0 km	MPC · JPL
417140	2005 VF_{76}	—	November 3, 2005	Socorro	LINEAR	·	1.7 km	MPC · JPL
417141	2005 VF_{81}	—	November 5, 2005	Kitt Peak	Spacewatch	EUN	1.5 km	MPC · JPL
417142	2005 VD_{83}	—	November 3, 2005	Mount Lemmon	Mount Lemmon Survey	ADE	2.3 km	MPC · JPL
417143	2005 VY_{83}	—	October 30, 2005	Mount Lemmon	Mount Lemmon Survey	·	1.9 km	MPC · JPL
417144	2005 VE_{90}	—	November 6, 2005	Kitt Peak	Spacewatch	·	1.6 km	MPC · JPL
417145	2005 VL_{93}	—	November 6, 2005	Mount Lemmon	Mount Lemmon Survey	526	2.6 km	MPC · JPL
417146	2005 VX_{103}	—	November 3, 2005	Kitt Peak	Spacewatch	·	1.7 km	MPC · JPL
417147	2005 VN_{108}	—	October 25, 2005	Kitt Peak	Spacewatch	AGN	1.2 km	MPC · JPL
417148	2005 VV_{109}	—	October 25, 2005	Kitt Peak	Spacewatch	·	1.9 km	MPC · JPL
417149	2005 VU_{111}	—	November 6, 2005	Mount Lemmon	Mount Lemmon Survey	AGN	980 m	MPC · JPL
417150	2005 VM_{114}	—	November 10, 2005	Mount Lemmon	Mount Lemmon Survey	·	2.6 km	MPC · JPL
417151	2005 VR_{115}	—	November 11, 2005	Kitt Peak	Spacewatch	·	1.4 km	MPC · JPL
417152	2005 VP_{116}	—	November 11, 2005	Kitt Peak	Spacewatch	GEF	1.1 km	MPC · JPL
417153	2005 VA_{125}	—	November 7, 2005	Mauna Kea	Mauna Kea	·	1.7 km	MPC · JPL
417154	2005 WU_{4}	—	November 20, 2005	Catalina	CSS	·	1.7 km	MPC · JPL
417155	2005 WE_{12}	—	October 25, 2005	Mount Lemmon	Mount Lemmon Survey	AGN	1.1 km	MPC · JPL
417156	2005 WM_{20}	—	November 21, 2005	Kitt Peak	Spacewatch	·	2.3 km	MPC · JPL
417157	2005 WX_{21}	—	October 30, 2005	Mount Lemmon	Mount Lemmon Survey	3:2	5.6 km	MPC · JPL
417158	2005 WN_{23}	—	September 30, 2005	Mount Lemmon	Mount Lemmon Survey	·	1.8 km	MPC · JPL
417159	2005 WK_{26}	—	November 21, 2005	Kitt Peak	Spacewatch	·	2.2 km	MPC · JPL
417160	2005 WO_{32}	—	November 21, 2005	Kitt Peak	Spacewatch	·	2.5 km	MPC · JPL
417161	2005 WF_{35}	—	November 22, 2005	Kitt Peak	Spacewatch	AST	1.4 km	MPC · JPL
417162	2005 WK_{43}	—	November 21, 2005	Anderson Mesa	LONEOS	·	1.9 km	MPC · JPL
417163	2005 WK_{44}	—	November 22, 2005	Kitt Peak	Spacewatch	·	2.2 km	MPC · JPL
417164	2005 WO_{50}	—	November 12, 2005	Kitt Peak	Spacewatch	·	1.5 km	MPC · JPL
417165	2005 WG_{51}	—	November 25, 2005	Kitt Peak	Spacewatch	AGN	1 km	MPC · JPL
417166	2005 WR_{51}	—	November 25, 2005	Kitt Peak	Spacewatch	·	1.8 km	MPC · JPL
417167	2005 WH_{57}	—	November 30, 2005	Socorro	LINEAR	AMO	560 m	MPC · JPL
417168	2005 WS_{57}	—	November 21, 2005	Catalina	CSS	·	2.2 km	MPC · JPL
417169	2005 WJ_{71}	—	November 21, 2005	Kitt Peak	Spacewatch	ADE	3.0 km	MPC · JPL
417170	2005 WQ_{71}	—	November 21, 2005	Catalina	CSS	·	2.1 km	MPC · JPL
417171	2005 WZ_{74}	—	November 5, 2005	Kitt Peak	Spacewatch	AEO	830 m	MPC · JPL
417172	2005 WS_{77}	—	November 25, 2005	Kitt Peak	Spacewatch	·	2.2 km	MPC · JPL
417173	2005 WM_{81}	—	November 26, 2005	Mount Lemmon	Mount Lemmon Survey	AGN	1.1 km	MPC · JPL
417174	2005 WV_{84}	—	November 26, 2005	Mount Lemmon	Mount Lemmon Survey	·	1.1 km	MPC · JPL
417175	2005 WB_{93}	—	November 25, 2005	Mount Lemmon	Mount Lemmon Survey	·	2.0 km	MPC · JPL
417176	2005 WM_{94}	—	April 29, 2003	Kitt Peak	Spacewatch	PAD	2.0 km	MPC · JPL
417177	2005 WD_{104}	—	November 28, 2005	Catalina	CSS	·	3.2 km	MPC · JPL
417178	2005 WO_{112}	—	November 30, 2005	Socorro	LINEAR	·	1.5 km	MPC · JPL
417179	2005 WW_{114}	—	November 28, 2005	Mount Lemmon	Mount Lemmon Survey	·	1.7 km	MPC · JPL
417180	2005 WQ_{124}	—	November 25, 2005	Kitt Peak	Spacewatch	AGN	840 m	MPC · JPL
417181	2005 WC_{138}	—	November 26, 2005	Mount Lemmon	Mount Lemmon Survey	·	1.6 km	MPC · JPL
417182	2005 WX_{138}	—	November 26, 2005	Mount Lemmon	Mount Lemmon Survey	·	1.4 km	MPC · JPL
417183	2005 WV_{139}	—	November 26, 2005	Mount Lemmon	Mount Lemmon Survey	·	1.6 km	MPC · JPL
417184	2005 WQ_{141}	—	November 28, 2005	Mount Lemmon	Mount Lemmon Survey	BRA	1.4 km	MPC · JPL
417185	2005 WB_{151}	—	November 28, 2005	Socorro	LINEAR	·	2.0 km	MPC · JPL
417186	2005 WK_{154}	—	November 29, 2005	Socorro	LINEAR	·	1.6 km	MPC · JPL
417187	2005 WU_{154}	—	November 29, 2005	Kitt Peak	Spacewatch	·	2.0 km	MPC · JPL
417188	2005 WA_{163}	—	November 29, 2005	Kitt Peak	Spacewatch	MAR	1.2 km	MPC · JPL
417189	2005 WV_{169}	—	November 22, 2005	Kitt Peak	Spacewatch	AGN	1.1 km	MPC · JPL
417190	2005 WQ_{172}	—	November 30, 2005	Mount Lemmon	Mount Lemmon Survey	·	1.3 km	MPC · JPL
417191	2005 WK_{173}	—	November 30, 2005	Kitt Peak	Spacewatch	·	1.7 km	MPC · JPL
417192	2005 WT_{182}	—	November 26, 2005	Socorro	LINEAR	·	4.2 km	MPC · JPL
417193	2005 WS_{186}	—	November 29, 2005	Kitt Peak	Spacewatch	NEM	2.1 km	MPC · JPL
417194	2005 WJ_{193}	—	November 28, 2005	Catalina	CSS	·	2.9 km	MPC · JPL
417195	2005 WB_{196}	—	November 26, 2005	Mount Lemmon	Mount Lemmon Survey	EUN	1.9 km	MPC · JPL
417196	2005 WQ_{198}	—	November 25, 2005	Kitt Peak	Spacewatch	·	1.7 km	MPC · JPL
417197	2005 WS_{198}	—	November 25, 2005	Kitt Peak	Spacewatch	·	1.8 km	MPC · JPL
417198	2005 WM_{201}	—	November 29, 2005	Kitt Peak	Spacewatch	·	2.5 km	MPC · JPL
417199	2005 WH_{208}	—	November 25, 2005	Mount Lemmon	Mount Lemmon Survey	AGN	1.1 km	MPC · JPL
417200	2005 XA_{4}	—	December 1, 2005	Palomar	NEAT	·	2.0 km	MPC · JPL

== 417201–417300 ==
back to top

Designation			Discovery			Properties		Ref
Permanent	Provisional	Named after	Date	Site	Discoverer(s)	Category	Diam.	Ref
417201	2005 XM_{4}	—	December 4, 2005	Siding Spring	SSS	AMO	410 m	MPC · JPL
417202	2005 XL_{5}	—	November 6, 2005	Mount Lemmon	Mount Lemmon Survey	·	1.3 km	MPC · JPL
417203	2005 XL_{11}	—	December 1, 2005	Kitt Peak	Spacewatch	·	2.7 km	MPC · JPL
417204	2005 XS_{39}	—	December 5, 2005	Socorro	LINEAR	·	3.1 km	MPC · JPL
417205	2005 XZ_{41}	—	December 2, 2005	Mount Lemmon	Mount Lemmon Survey	·	1.3 km	MPC · JPL
417206	2005 XC_{50}	—	December 2, 2005	Kitt Peak	Spacewatch	DOR	2.8 km	MPC · JPL
417207	2005 XE_{58}	—	December 2, 2005	Mount Lemmon	Mount Lemmon Survey	NEM	1.7 km	MPC · JPL
417208	2005 XW_{58}	—	December 2, 2005	Mount Lemmon	Mount Lemmon Survey	·	1.8 km	MPC · JPL
417209	2005 XY_{61}	—	December 5, 2005	Socorro	LINEAR	·	1.7 km	MPC · JPL
417210	2005 XV_{77}	—	December 10, 2005	Catalina	CSS	ATE	280 m	MPC · JPL
417211	2005 XL_{80}	—	December 14, 2005	Anderson Mesa	LONEOS	APO +1km · PHA	790 m	MPC · JPL
417212	2005 XZ_{81}	—	December 8, 2005	Kitt Peak	Spacewatch	AGN	1.1 km	MPC · JPL
417213	2005 XY_{86}	—	December 10, 2005	Kitt Peak	Spacewatch	AGN	1 km	MPC · JPL
417214	2005 XF_{102}	—	December 1, 2005	Kitt Peak	M. W. Buie	·	2.6 km	MPC · JPL
417215	2005 XM_{103}	—	December 1, 2005	Kitt Peak	M. W. Buie	·	3.5 km	MPC · JPL
417216	2005 XV_{109}	—	December 1, 2005	Kitt Peak	M. W. Buie	·	1.2 km	MPC · JPL
417217	2005 YS	—	December 21, 2005	Socorro	LINEAR	ATE · PHA	440 m	MPC · JPL
417218	2005 YL_{12}	—	November 30, 2005	Kitt Peak	Spacewatch	·	1.9 km	MPC · JPL
417219	2005 YT_{12}	—	December 22, 2005	Kitt Peak	Spacewatch	·	1.8 km	MPC · JPL
417220	2005 YV_{24}	—	December 24, 2005	Kitt Peak	Spacewatch	·	2.1 km	MPC · JPL
417221	2005 YJ_{28}	—	December 22, 2005	Kitt Peak	Spacewatch	·	1.8 km	MPC · JPL
417222	2005 YW_{31}	—	December 22, 2005	Kitt Peak	Spacewatch	·	2.7 km	MPC · JPL
417223	2005 YH_{34}	—	December 24, 2005	Kitt Peak	Spacewatch	·	1.9 km	MPC · JPL
417224	2005 YQ_{37}	—	December 21, 2005	Catalina	CSS	526	2.9 km	MPC · JPL
417225	2005 YO_{41}	—	December 22, 2005	Catalina	CSS	·	2.0 km	MPC · JPL
417226	2005 YE_{47}	—	December 25, 2005	Kitt Peak	Spacewatch	·	1.9 km	MPC · JPL
417227	2005 YQ_{48}	—	December 22, 2005	Kitt Peak	Spacewatch	·	1.9 km	MPC · JPL
417228	2005 YA_{50}	—	December 25, 2005	Kitt Peak	Spacewatch	AGN	1.0 km	MPC · JPL
417229	2005 YK_{52}	—	November 30, 2005	Mount Lemmon	Mount Lemmon Survey	·	1.2 km	MPC · JPL
417230	2005 YW_{56}	—	November 30, 2005	Kitt Peak	Spacewatch	KOR	1.4 km	MPC · JPL
417231	2005 YT_{57}	—	December 24, 2005	Kitt Peak	Spacewatch	·	1.6 km	MPC · JPL
417232	2005 YN_{70}	—	December 27, 2005	Mount Lemmon	Mount Lemmon Survey	·	1.9 km	MPC · JPL
417233	2005 YB_{72}	—	December 5, 2005	Socorro	LINEAR	·	2.6 km	MPC · JPL
417234	2005 YM_{74}	—	December 24, 2005	Kitt Peak	Spacewatch	·	1.5 km	MPC · JPL
417235	2005 YA_{77}	—	December 24, 2005	Kitt Peak	Spacewatch	·	2.4 km	MPC · JPL
417236	2005 YS_{88}	—	December 25, 2005	Mount Lemmon	Mount Lemmon Survey	·	2.0 km	MPC · JPL
417237	2005 YY_{91}	—	December 27, 2005	Socorro	LINEAR	·	2.2 km	MPC · JPL
417238	2005 YL_{92}	—	December 27, 2005	Mount Lemmon	Mount Lemmon Survey	·	1.8 km	MPC · JPL
417239	2005 YF_{110}	—	December 25, 2005	Kitt Peak	Spacewatch	·	2.2 km	MPC · JPL
417240	2005 YV_{117}	—	December 25, 2005	Kitt Peak	Spacewatch	·	1.7 km	MPC · JPL
417241	2005 YH_{122}	—	December 22, 2005	Catalina	CSS	·	2.2 km	MPC · JPL
417242	2005 YY_{132}	—	December 10, 2005	Kitt Peak	Spacewatch	·	2.6 km	MPC · JPL
417243	2005 YY_{156}	—	December 27, 2005	Kitt Peak	Spacewatch	·	1.9 km	MPC · JPL
417244	2005 YZ_{160}	—	December 27, 2005	Kitt Peak	Spacewatch	·	2.2 km	MPC · JPL
417245	2005 YN_{161}	—	December 27, 2005	Socorro	LINEAR	·	2.0 km	MPC · JPL
417246	2005 YZ_{184}	—	December 27, 2005	Mount Lemmon	Mount Lemmon Survey	·	2.1 km	MPC · JPL
417247	2005 YD_{188}	—	December 28, 2005	Kitt Peak	Spacewatch	·	2.2 km	MPC · JPL
417248	2005 YY_{191}	—	December 30, 2005	Kitt Peak	Spacewatch	·	900 m	MPC · JPL
417249	2005 YE_{204}	—	December 25, 2005	Mount Lemmon	Mount Lemmon Survey	AEO	1.1 km	MPC · JPL
417250	2005 YZ_{205}	—	December 27, 2005	Kitt Peak	Spacewatch	MRX	1.0 km	MPC · JPL
417251	2005 YS_{207}	—	December 29, 2005	Kitt Peak	Spacewatch	·	1.6 km	MPC · JPL
417252	2005 YN_{217}	—	December 30, 2005	Kitt Peak	Spacewatch	·	1.7 km	MPC · JPL
417253	2005 YS_{222}	—	December 21, 2005	Catalina	CSS	·	3.1 km	MPC · JPL
417254	2005 YW_{227}	—	December 25, 2005	Mount Lemmon	Mount Lemmon Survey	·	1.9 km	MPC · JPL
417255	2005 YQ_{229}	—	December 2, 2005	Kitt Peak	Spacewatch	·	2.6 km	MPC · JPL
417256	2005 YA_{238}	—	December 28, 2005	Kitt Peak	Spacewatch	·	2.4 km	MPC · JPL
417257	2005 YD_{245}	—	December 30, 2005	Kitt Peak	Spacewatch	·	1.5 km	MPC · JPL
417258	2005 YK_{245}	—	December 30, 2005	Mount Lemmon	Mount Lemmon Survey	·	2.0 km	MPC · JPL
417259	2005 YM_{258}	—	December 22, 2005	Kitt Peak	Spacewatch	·	1.5 km	MPC · JPL
417260	2005 YN_{260}	—	December 24, 2005	Kitt Peak	Spacewatch	·	1.8 km	MPC · JPL
417261	2005 YX_{260}	—	December 24, 2005	Kitt Peak	Spacewatch	NEM	2.1 km	MPC · JPL
417262	2005 YG_{271}	—	December 28, 2005	Kitt Peak	Spacewatch	GEF	1.2 km	MPC · JPL
417263	2005 YV_{286}	—	December 31, 2005	Kitt Peak	Spacewatch	·	2.9 km	MPC · JPL
417264	2006 AT_{2}	—	January 5, 2006	Catalina	CSS	AMO +1km	1.9 km	MPC · JPL
417265	2006 AQ_{6}	—	December 29, 2005	Catalina	CSS	·	2.7 km	MPC · JPL
417266	2006 AD_{15}	—	January 5, 2006	Mount Lemmon	Mount Lemmon Survey	·	1.2 km	MPC · JPL
417267	2006 AA_{25}	—	December 5, 2005	Mount Lemmon	Mount Lemmon Survey	BRA	1.3 km	MPC · JPL
417268	2006 AM_{29}	—	January 2, 2006	Catalina	CSS	·	2.1 km	MPC · JPL
417269	2006 AQ_{31}	—	January 5, 2006	Catalina	CSS	JUN	1.2 km	MPC · JPL
417270	2006 AG_{32}	—	January 5, 2006	Catalina	CSS	·	4.1 km	MPC · JPL
417271	2006 AQ_{32}	—	January 5, 2006	Kitt Peak	Spacewatch	·	1.5 km	MPC · JPL
417272	2006 AU_{34}	—	December 22, 2005	Kitt Peak	Spacewatch	·	2.0 km	MPC · JPL
417273	2006 AX_{42}	—	January 6, 2006	Kitt Peak	Spacewatch	·	2.3 km	MPC · JPL
417274	2006 AL_{44}	—	January 7, 2006	Kitt Peak	Spacewatch	L5	8.7 km	MPC · JPL
417275	2006 AO_{47}	—	January 7, 2006	Mount Lemmon	Mount Lemmon Survey	·	1.6 km	MPC · JPL
417276	2006 AV_{50}	—	December 26, 2005	Mount Lemmon	Mount Lemmon Survey	NEM	2.9 km	MPC · JPL
417277	2006 AJ_{57}	—	January 8, 2006	Mount Lemmon	Mount Lemmon Survey	·	1.8 km	MPC · JPL
417278	2006 AC_{62}	—	January 5, 2006	Kitt Peak	Spacewatch	·	1.8 km	MPC · JPL
417279	2006 AT_{65}	—	January 8, 2006	Kitt Peak	Spacewatch	KOR	1.2 km	MPC · JPL
417280	2006 AR_{67}	—	January 9, 2006	Mount Lemmon	Mount Lemmon Survey	·	2.6 km	MPC · JPL
417281	2006 AG_{90}	—	January 6, 2006	Mount Lemmon	Mount Lemmon Survey	·	2.0 km	MPC · JPL
417282	2006 AZ_{96}	—	January 3, 2006	Socorro	LINEAR	·	3.3 km	MPC · JPL
417283	2006 AL_{97}	—	January 6, 2006	Catalina	CSS	·	3.8 km	MPC · JPL
417284	2006 AC_{105}	—	January 7, 2006	Mount Lemmon	Mount Lemmon Survey	EOS	2.0 km	MPC · JPL
417285	2006 BH_{2}	—	January 7, 2006	Mount Lemmon	Mount Lemmon Survey	·	2.4 km	MPC · JPL
417286	2006 BS_{3}	—	December 25, 2005	Mount Lemmon	Mount Lemmon Survey	·	1.8 km	MPC · JPL
417287	2006 BH_{5}	—	January 8, 2006	Kitt Peak	Spacewatch	·	2.0 km	MPC · JPL
417288	2006 BB_{6}	—	November 29, 2005	Mount Lemmon	Mount Lemmon Survey	·	3.9 km	MPC · JPL
417289	2006 BK_{8}	—	November 30, 2005	Mount Lemmon	Mount Lemmon Survey	·	1.8 km	MPC · JPL
417290	2006 BJ_{30}	—	December 6, 2005	Mount Lemmon	Mount Lemmon Survey	·	2.2 km	MPC · JPL
417291	2006 BQ_{45}	—	January 7, 2006	Mount Lemmon	Mount Lemmon Survey	·	2.3 km	MPC · JPL
417292	2006 BP_{57}	—	January 23, 2006	Kitt Peak	Spacewatch	·	1.9 km	MPC · JPL
417293	2006 BV_{63}	—	January 22, 2006	Mount Lemmon	Mount Lemmon Survey	AGN	1.1 km	MPC · JPL
417294	2006 BK_{66}	—	January 23, 2006	Kitt Peak	Spacewatch	·	1.9 km	MPC · JPL
417295	2006 BB_{69}	—	January 23, 2006	Kitt Peak	Spacewatch	AGN	1.4 km	MPC · JPL
417296	2006 BH_{69}	—	January 23, 2006	Kitt Peak	Spacewatch	·	1.8 km	MPC · JPL
417297	2006 BA_{72}	—	January 23, 2006	Kitt Peak	Spacewatch	·	2.5 km	MPC · JPL
417298	2006 BE_{80}	—	January 23, 2006	Kitt Peak	Spacewatch	·	2.4 km	MPC · JPL
417299	2006 BT_{80}	—	January 23, 2006	Kitt Peak	Spacewatch	BRA	2.1 km	MPC · JPL
417300	2006 BA_{82}	—	January 23, 2006	Kitt Peak	Spacewatch	·	4.2 km	MPC · JPL

== 417301–417400 ==
back to top

Designation			Discovery			Properties		Ref
Permanent	Provisional	Named after	Date	Site	Discoverer(s)	Category	Diam.	Ref
417301	2006 BM_{86}	—	January 25, 2006	Kitt Peak	Spacewatch	JUN	1.1 km	MPC · JPL
417302	2006 BV_{90}	—	January 26, 2006	Socorro	LINEAR	·	2.3 km	MPC · JPL
417303	2006 BE_{97}	—	January 26, 2006	Mount Lemmon	Mount Lemmon Survey	·	3.6 km	MPC · JPL
417304	2006 BS_{97}	—	January 27, 2006	Mount Lemmon	Mount Lemmon Survey	AGN	1.4 km	MPC · JPL
417305	2006 BA_{103}	—	January 23, 2006	Mount Lemmon	Mount Lemmon Survey	L5	10 km	MPC · JPL
417306	2006 BT_{109}	—	September 12, 2001	Kitt Peak	Deep Ecliptic Survey	·	1.0 km	MPC · JPL
417307	2006 BB_{111}	—	January 25, 2006	Kitt Peak	Spacewatch	·	2.5 km	MPC · JPL
417308	2006 BC_{113}	—	January 25, 2006	Kitt Peak	Spacewatch	·	2.0 km	MPC · JPL
417309	2006 BR_{120}	—	January 21, 2006	Kitt Peak	Spacewatch	·	760 m	MPC · JPL
417310	2006 BM_{133}	—	January 26, 2006	Kitt Peak	Spacewatch	·	2.9 km	MPC · JPL
417311	2006 BF_{146}	—	January 29, 2006	Altschwendt	Altschwendt	·	1.7 km	MPC · JPL
417312	2006 BS_{146}	—	January 23, 2006	Kitt Peak	Spacewatch	·	2.4 km	MPC · JPL
417313	2006 BV_{153}	—	January 25, 2006	Kitt Peak	Spacewatch	·	660 m	MPC · JPL
417314	2006 BR_{154}	—	January 25, 2006	Kitt Peak	Spacewatch	·	2.3 km	MPC · JPL
417315	2006 BA_{163}	—	January 26, 2006	Mount Lemmon	Mount Lemmon Survey	·	1.6 km	MPC · JPL
417316	2006 BX_{163}	—	January 26, 2006	Mount Lemmon	Mount Lemmon Survey	·	2.6 km	MPC · JPL
417317	2006 BL_{168}	—	January 26, 2006	Kitt Peak	Spacewatch	·	710 m	MPC · JPL
417318	2006 BA_{169}	—	January 26, 2006	Mount Lemmon	Mount Lemmon Survey	·	3.7 km	MPC · JPL
417319	2006 BT_{181}	—	January 27, 2006	Mount Lemmon	Mount Lemmon Survey	EOS	1.7 km	MPC · JPL
417320	2006 BU_{228}	—	January 23, 2006	Kitt Peak	Spacewatch	·	2.0 km	MPC · JPL
417321	2006 BJ_{247}	—	January 25, 1996	Kitt Peak	Spacewatch	·	880 m	MPC · JPL
417322	2006 BU_{282}	—	August 25, 2003	Palomar	NEAT	·	2.9 km	MPC · JPL
417323	2006 BX_{283}	—	January 25, 2006	Kitt Peak	Spacewatch	·	1.5 km	MPC · JPL
417324	2006 CE_{14}	—	January 23, 2006	Mount Lemmon	Mount Lemmon Survey	L5	9.1 km	MPC · JPL
417325	2006 CJ_{22}	—	February 1, 2006	Kitt Peak	Spacewatch	·	1.9 km	MPC · JPL
417326	2006 CJ_{24}	—	February 2, 2006	Kitt Peak	Spacewatch	·	1.7 km	MPC · JPL
417327	2006 CZ_{29}	—	February 2, 2006	Kitt Peak	Spacewatch	L5	10 km	MPC · JPL
417328	2006 CW_{46}	—	January 7, 2006	Mount Lemmon	Mount Lemmon Survey	·	1.8 km	MPC · JPL
417329	2006 CH_{51}	—	January 22, 2006	Mount Lemmon	Mount Lemmon Survey	·	2.0 km	MPC · JPL
417330	2006 DB_{3}	—	February 20, 2006	Kitt Peak	Spacewatch	·	2.1 km	MPC · JPL
417331	2006 DO_{5}	—	January 31, 2006	Kitt Peak	Spacewatch	KOR	1.3 km	MPC · JPL
417332	2006 DQ_{17}	—	January 23, 2006	Kitt Peak	Spacewatch	·	2.3 km	MPC · JPL
417333	2006 DY_{21}	—	February 20, 2006	Kitt Peak	Spacewatch	·	1.7 km	MPC · JPL
417334	2006 DX_{44}	—	February 20, 2006	Kitt Peak	Spacewatch	AGN	1.3 km	MPC · JPL
417335	2006 DQ_{59}	—	February 24, 2006	Mount Lemmon	Mount Lemmon Survey	·	3.3 km	MPC · JPL
417336	2006 DZ_{69}	—	February 20, 2006	Kitt Peak	Spacewatch	·	1.8 km	MPC · JPL
417337	2006 DR_{79}	—	February 24, 2006	Kitt Peak	Spacewatch	·	1.5 km	MPC · JPL
417338	2006 DE_{88}	—	February 24, 2006	Kitt Peak	Spacewatch	·	2.4 km	MPC · JPL
417339	2006 DL_{96}	—	February 24, 2006	Kitt Peak	Spacewatch	·	800 m	MPC · JPL
417340	2006 DW_{108}	—	February 25, 2006	Kitt Peak	Spacewatch	·	2.8 km	MPC · JPL
417341	2006 DW_{112}	—	February 27, 2006	Mount Lemmon	Mount Lemmon Survey	·	3.1 km	MPC · JPL
417342	2006 DR_{122}	—	February 24, 2006	Anderson Mesa	LONEOS	·	1.6 km	MPC · JPL
417343	2006 DP_{133}	—	February 25, 2006	Kitt Peak	Spacewatch	·	1.8 km	MPC · JPL
417344	2006 DR_{144}	—	February 25, 2006	Mount Lemmon	Mount Lemmon Survey	·	1.7 km	MPC · JPL
417345	2006 DE_{154}	—	February 25, 2006	Kitt Peak	Spacewatch	·	3.0 km	MPC · JPL
417346	2006 DJ_{157}	—	February 27, 2006	Kitt Peak	Spacewatch	·	590 m	MPC · JPL
417347	2006 DR_{182}	—	February 27, 2006	Mount Lemmon	Mount Lemmon Survey	·	700 m	MPC · JPL
417348	2006 DD_{201}	—	February 27, 2006	Catalina	CSS	·	3.9 km	MPC · JPL
417349	2006 EP_{18}	—	March 2, 2006	Kitt Peak	Spacewatch	·	2.3 km	MPC · JPL
417350	2006 EY_{18}	—	February 24, 2006	Kitt Peak	Spacewatch	·	1.7 km	MPC · JPL
417351	2006 EM_{30}	—	March 3, 2006	Kitt Peak	Spacewatch	·	2.2 km	MPC · JPL
417352	2006 EO_{35}	—	March 3, 2006	Kitt Peak	Spacewatch	·	2.5 km	MPC · JPL
417353	2006 EF_{41}	—	March 4, 2006	Kitt Peak	Spacewatch	EOS	1.9 km	MPC · JPL
417354	2006 EB_{57}	—	February 2, 2006	Kitt Peak	Spacewatch	L5	9.1 km	MPC · JPL
417355	2006 EY_{67}	—	January 25, 2006	Kitt Peak	Spacewatch	·	2.6 km	MPC · JPL
417356	2006 FN_{13}	—	March 23, 2006	Kitt Peak	Spacewatch	·	750 m	MPC · JPL
417357	2006 FD_{17}	—	March 23, 2006	Mount Lemmon	Mount Lemmon Survey	·	590 m	MPC · JPL
417358	2006 FQ_{21}	—	March 24, 2006	Mount Lemmon	Mount Lemmon Survey	·	2.8 km	MPC · JPL
417359	2006 FO_{28}	—	March 24, 2006	Mount Lemmon	Mount Lemmon Survey	EOS	1.9 km	MPC · JPL
417360	2006 FY_{28}	—	March 24, 2006	Mount Lemmon	Mount Lemmon Survey	·	2.7 km	MPC · JPL
417361	2006 FT_{32}	—	March 25, 2006	Kitt Peak	Spacewatch	·	2.9 km	MPC · JPL
417362	2006 FZ_{43}	—	March 3, 2006	Catalina	CSS	·	2.8 km	MPC · JPL
417363	2006 FN_{53}	—	March 24, 2006	Mount Lemmon	Mount Lemmon Survey	·	2.5 km	MPC · JPL
417364	2006 FF_{55}	—	March 23, 2006	Mount Lemmon	Mount Lemmon Survey	·	2.1 km	MPC · JPL
417365	2006 GZ_{1}	—	April 27, 2001	Kitt Peak	Spacewatch	EOS	2.4 km	MPC · JPL
417366	2006 GK_{2}	—	April 5, 2006	Cordell-Lorenz	D. T. Durig, Plunkett, C. E.	·	3.6 km	MPC · JPL
417367	2006 GD_{26}	—	April 2, 2006	Kitt Peak	Spacewatch	·	820 m	MPC · JPL
417368	2006 GL_{27}	—	April 2, 2006	Kitt Peak	Spacewatch	HYG	2.9 km	MPC · JPL
417369	2006 GD_{30}	—	April 4, 1995	Kitt Peak	Spacewatch	·	2.8 km	MPC · JPL
417370	2006 GS_{35}	—	April 7, 2006	Catalina	CSS	·	4.5 km	MPC · JPL
417371	2006 GH_{39}	—	April 8, 2006	Anderson Mesa	LONEOS	PHO	1.1 km	MPC · JPL
417372	2006 GD_{47}	—	April 9, 2006	Kitt Peak	Spacewatch	·	2.2 km	MPC · JPL
417373	2006 GJ_{55}	—	April 9, 2006	Kitt Peak	Spacewatch	·	2.9 km	MPC · JPL
417374	2006 HL_{21}	—	April 20, 2006	Kitt Peak	Spacewatch	·	2.3 km	MPC · JPL
417375	2006 HY_{23}	—	April 20, 2006	Kitt Peak	Spacewatch	EMA	4.2 km	MPC · JPL
417376	2006 HJ_{29}	—	April 21, 2006	Mount Lemmon	Mount Lemmon Survey	·	3.3 km	MPC · JPL
417377	2006 HL_{32}	—	April 19, 2006	Palomar	NEAT	·	3.5 km	MPC · JPL
417378	2006 HB_{53}	—	April 19, 2006	Anderson Mesa	LONEOS	EOS	2.6 km	MPC · JPL
417379	2006 HS_{55}	—	April 24, 2006	Anderson Mesa	LONEOS	·	3.3 km	MPC · JPL
417380	2006 HM_{57}	—	April 29, 2006	Wrightwood	J. W. Young	·	3.5 km	MPC · JPL
417381	2006 HR_{57}	—	April 28, 2006	Socorro	LINEAR	(2076)	930 m	MPC · JPL
417382	2006 HY_{59}	—	April 24, 2006	Anderson Mesa	LONEOS	·	950 m	MPC · JPL
417383	2006 HZ_{67}	—	April 24, 2006	Mount Lemmon	Mount Lemmon Survey	·	3.6 km	MPC · JPL
417384	2006 HR_{68}	—	April 24, 2006	Kitt Peak	Spacewatch	·	3.3 km	MPC · JPL
417385	2006 HR_{71}	—	April 25, 2006	Kitt Peak	Spacewatch	·	3.4 km	MPC · JPL
417386	2006 HP_{75}	—	April 25, 2006	Kitt Peak	Spacewatch	·	3.1 km	MPC · JPL
417387	2006 HK_{93}	—	April 29, 2006	Kitt Peak	Spacewatch	·	3.7 km	MPC · JPL
417388	2006 HC_{94}	—	April 29, 2006	Kitt Peak	Spacewatch	·	2.9 km	MPC · JPL
417389	2006 HU_{100}	—	April 30, 2006	Kitt Peak	Spacewatch	·	860 m	MPC · JPL
417390	2006 HA_{108}	—	April 30, 2006	Kitt Peak	Spacewatch	·	2.7 km	MPC · JPL
417391	2006 HB_{115}	—	April 26, 2006	Kitt Peak	Spacewatch	EOS	2.2 km	MPC · JPL
417392	2006 HK_{115}	—	April 26, 2006	Kitt Peak	Spacewatch	VER	2.7 km	MPC · JPL
417393	2006 HW_{116}	—	April 26, 2006	Kitt Peak	Spacewatch	·	760 m	MPC · JPL
417394	2006 HY_{118}	—	April 30, 2006	Kitt Peak	Spacewatch	·	680 m	MPC · JPL
417395	2006 HL_{122}	—	April 26, 2006	Catalina	CSS	T_{j} (2.99)	4.6 km	MPC · JPL
417396	2006 HM_{134}	—	April 26, 2006	Cerro Tololo	M. W. Buie	·	1.7 km	MPC · JPL
417397	2006 HE_{149}	—	April 27, 2006	Cerro Tololo	M. W. Buie	·	3.7 km	MPC · JPL
417398	2006 HC_{154}	—	April 24, 2006	Kitt Peak	Spacewatch	·	3.1 km	MPC · JPL
417399	2006 HD_{154}	—	April 26, 2006	Kitt Peak	Spacewatch	·	3.0 km	MPC · JPL
417400	2006 HG_{154}	—	April 29, 2006	Kitt Peak	Spacewatch	·	4.1 km	MPC · JPL

== 417401–417500 ==
back to top

Designation			Discovery			Properties		Ref
Permanent	Provisional	Named after	Date	Site	Discoverer(s)	Category	Diam.	Ref
417401	2006 JT_{3}	—	April 19, 2006	Mount Lemmon	Mount Lemmon Survey	·	3.3 km	MPC · JPL
417402	2006 JO_{5}	—	April 24, 2006	Mount Lemmon	Mount Lemmon Survey	·	1.8 km	MPC · JPL
417403	2006 JA_{10}	—	May 1, 2006	Kitt Peak	Spacewatch	·	2.8 km	MPC · JPL
417404	2006 JC_{12}	—	May 1, 2006	Kitt Peak	Spacewatch	·	830 m	MPC · JPL
417405	2006 JR_{14}	—	May 1, 2006	Kitt Peak	Spacewatch	NYS	960 m	MPC · JPL
417406	2006 JO_{21}	—	November 24, 2003	Kitt Peak	Spacewatch	EOS	2.0 km	MPC · JPL
417407	2006 JF_{30}	—	May 3, 2006	Kitt Peak	Spacewatch	·	3.5 km	MPC · JPL
417408	2006 JT_{31}	—	April 21, 2006	Kitt Peak	Spacewatch	·	2.9 km	MPC · JPL
417409	2006 JY_{34}	—	May 4, 2006	Kitt Peak	Spacewatch	·	2.0 km	MPC · JPL
417410	2006 JN_{35}	—	May 4, 2006	Kitt Peak	Spacewatch	·	2.8 km	MPC · JPL
417411	2006 JG_{39}	—	May 6, 2006	Mount Lemmon	Mount Lemmon Survey	·	4.0 km	MPC · JPL
417412	2006 JM_{40}	—	May 7, 2006	Kitt Peak	Spacewatch	·	5.0 km	MPC · JPL
417413	2006 JF_{48}	—	April 30, 2006	Kitt Peak	Spacewatch	·	3.2 km	MPC · JPL
417414	2006 JP_{53}	—	May 6, 2006	Mount Lemmon	Mount Lemmon Survey	·	2.8 km	MPC · JPL
417415	2006 JD_{54}	—	May 7, 2006	Mount Lemmon	Mount Lemmon Survey	·	1.0 km	MPC · JPL
417416	2006 KV_{4}	—	May 19, 2006	Mount Lemmon	Mount Lemmon Survey	V	650 m	MPC · JPL
417417	2006 KM_{11}	—	May 19, 2006	Palomar	NEAT	·	720 m	MPC · JPL
417418	2006 KX_{18}	—	May 21, 2006	Kitt Peak	Spacewatch	·	1.2 km	MPC · JPL
417419	2006 KL_{21}	—	May 23, 2006	Catalina	CSS	AMO · PHA	230 m	MPC · JPL
417420	2006 KK_{36}	—	May 21, 2006	Kitt Peak	Spacewatch	·	3.9 km	MPC · JPL
417421	2006 KF_{37}	—	May 22, 2006	Kitt Peak	Spacewatch	·	4.3 km	MPC · JPL
417422	2006 KZ_{42}	—	May 20, 2006	Mount Lemmon	Mount Lemmon Survey	·	1.3 km	MPC · JPL
417423	2006 KJ_{43}	—	April 12, 2000	Kitt Peak	Spacewatch	THM	2.4 km	MPC · JPL
417424	2006 KC_{47}	—	May 21, 2006	Mount Lemmon	Mount Lemmon Survey	NYS	920 m	MPC · JPL
417425	2006 KQ_{49}	—	May 21, 2006	Kitt Peak	Spacewatch	HYG	2.4 km	MPC · JPL
417426	2006 KS_{50}	—	May 21, 2006	Kitt Peak	Spacewatch	·	720 m	MPC · JPL
417427	2006 KD_{53}	—	May 21, 2006	Kitt Peak	Spacewatch	·	3.7 km	MPC · JPL
417428	2006 KY_{59}	—	May 22, 2006	Kitt Peak	Spacewatch	EOS	1.9 km	MPC · JPL
417429	2006 KG_{60}	—	May 22, 2006	Kitt Peak	Spacewatch	·	3.6 km	MPC · JPL
417430	2006 KK_{68}	—	May 20, 2006	Mount Lemmon	Mount Lemmon Survey	·	860 m	MPC · JPL
417431	2006 KW_{70}	—	May 22, 2006	Kitt Peak	Spacewatch	·	3.9 km	MPC · JPL
417432	2006 KL_{71}	—	May 22, 2006	Kitt Peak	Spacewatch	·	1.0 km	MPC · JPL
417433	2006 KM_{73}	—	May 23, 2006	Kitt Peak	Spacewatch	·	1.0 km	MPC · JPL
417434	2006 KP_{73}	—	May 23, 2006	Kitt Peak	Spacewatch	·	4.1 km	MPC · JPL
417435	2006 KQ_{75}	—	May 24, 2006	Kitt Peak	Spacewatch	·	3.7 km	MPC · JPL
417436	2006 KE_{80}	—	May 25, 2006	Mount Lemmon	Mount Lemmon Survey	·	3.0 km	MPC · JPL
417437	2006 KD_{81}	—	May 25, 2006	Mount Lemmon	Mount Lemmon Survey	(2076)	720 m	MPC · JPL
417438	2006 KE_{85}	—	May 18, 2006	Palomar	NEAT	·	4.0 km	MPC · JPL
417439	2006 KS_{91}	—	May 25, 2006	Kitt Peak	Spacewatch	·	4.1 km	MPC · JPL
417440	2006 KJ_{95}	—	May 25, 2006	Mount Lemmon	Mount Lemmon Survey	·	4.4 km	MPC · JPL
417441	2006 KG_{100}	—	May 24, 2006	Reedy Creek	J. Broughton	·	710 m	MPC · JPL
417442	2006 KU_{101}	—	May 27, 2006	Kitt Peak	Spacewatch	·	1.0 km	MPC · JPL
417443	2006 KX_{119}	—	May 31, 2006	Kitt Peak	Spacewatch	·	2.4 km	MPC · JPL
417444	2006 OE_{2}	—	July 20, 2006	Siding Spring	SSS	·	520 m	MPC · JPL
417445	2006 OE_{11}	—	July 20, 2006	Palomar	NEAT	PHO	1.3 km	MPC · JPL
417446	2006 OZ_{11}	—	July 21, 2006	Catalina	CSS	·	1.7 km	MPC · JPL
417447	2006 PQ_{5}	—	August 12, 2006	Palomar	NEAT	·	1.5 km	MPC · JPL
417448	2006 PM_{6}	—	August 12, 2006	Palomar	NEAT	·	1.1 km	MPC · JPL
417449	2006 PR_{18}	—	August 13, 2006	Palomar	NEAT	·	910 m	MPC · JPL
417450	2006 PM_{25}	—	February 2, 2005	Kitt Peak	Spacewatch	·	2.4 km	MPC · JPL
417451	2006 PP_{43}	—	August 7, 2006	Siding Spring	SSS	·	2.4 km	MPC · JPL
417452	2006 QE_{13}	—	August 16, 2006	Siding Spring	SSS	V	810 m	MPC · JPL
417453	2006 QJ_{14}	—	August 17, 2006	Palomar	NEAT	NYS	1.0 km	MPC · JPL
417454	2006 QL_{14}	—	August 17, 2006	Palomar	NEAT	·	1.4 km	MPC · JPL
417455	2006 QX_{15}	—	August 17, 2006	Palomar	NEAT	MAS	790 m	MPC · JPL
417456	2006 QT_{32}	—	August 22, 2006	Palomar	NEAT	·	1.3 km	MPC · JPL
417457	2006 QX_{34}	—	August 17, 2006	Palomar	NEAT	·	990 m	MPC · JPL
417458	2006 QN_{35}	—	August 17, 2006	Palomar	NEAT	NYS	1.3 km	MPC · JPL
417459	2006 QT_{50}	—	August 22, 2006	Palomar	NEAT	·	1.8 km	MPC · JPL
417460	2006 QB_{51}	—	August 23, 2006	Socorro	LINEAR	·	1.3 km	MPC · JPL
417461	2006 QX_{54}	—	August 19, 2006	Palomar	NEAT	NYS	1.1 km	MPC · JPL
417462	2006 QH_{55}	—	August 20, 2006	Palomar	NEAT	·	1.5 km	MPC · JPL
417463	2006 QD_{59}	—	August 19, 2006	Anderson Mesa	LONEOS	·	2.0 km	MPC · JPL
417464	2006 QY_{64}	—	August 27, 2006	Kitt Peak	Spacewatch	·	1.3 km	MPC · JPL
417465	2006 QW_{76}	—	August 21, 2006	Kitt Peak	Spacewatch	NYS	1.1 km	MPC · JPL
417466	2006 QC_{92}	—	August 16, 2006	Palomar	NEAT	·	1.2 km	MPC · JPL
417467	2006 QN_{99}	—	August 23, 2006	Palomar	NEAT	PHO	940 m	MPC · JPL
417468	2006 QT_{106}	—	August 28, 2006	Catalina	CSS	·	2.1 km	MPC · JPL
417469	2006 QU_{128}	—	August 17, 2006	Palomar	NEAT	·	1.4 km	MPC · JPL
417470	2006 QK_{146}	—	August 18, 2006	Kitt Peak	Spacewatch	·	1.6 km	MPC · JPL
417471	2006 QJ_{183}	—	August 28, 2006	Kitt Peak	Spacewatch	·	1.1 km	MPC · JPL
417472	2006 RZ_{7}	—	September 12, 2006	Catalina	CSS	MAS	770 m	MPC · JPL
417473	2006 RD_{21}	—	September 15, 2006	Kitt Peak	Spacewatch	MAS	590 m	MPC · JPL
417474	2006 RR_{22}	—	September 15, 2006	Eskridge	Farpoint	NYS	970 m	MPC · JPL
417475	2006 RF_{30}	—	September 15, 2006	Kitt Peak	Spacewatch	·	3.5 km	MPC · JPL
417476	2006 RD_{37}	—	August 27, 2006	Kitt Peak	Spacewatch	NYS	1.1 km	MPC · JPL
417477	2006 RH_{38}	—	September 13, 2006	Palomar	NEAT	·	1.3 km	MPC · JPL
417478	2006 RV_{38}	—	September 14, 2006	Catalina	CSS	·	1.2 km	MPC · JPL
417479	2006 RC_{40}	—	September 12, 2006	Catalina	CSS	·	2.5 km	MPC · JPL
417480	2006 RK_{41}	—	September 14, 2006	Palomar	NEAT	MAS	700 m	MPC · JPL
417481	2006 RP_{53}	—	September 14, 2006	Kitt Peak	Spacewatch	·	720 m	MPC · JPL
417482	2006 RQ_{55}	—	September 14, 2006	Kitt Peak	Spacewatch	MAS	620 m	MPC · JPL
417483	2006 RW_{59}	—	September 15, 2006	Kitt Peak	Spacewatch	·	1.1 km	MPC · JPL
417484	2006 RR_{64}	—	September 14, 2006	Kitt Peak	Spacewatch	·	3.8 km	MPC · JPL
417485	2006 RN_{69}	—	September 15, 2006	Kitt Peak	Spacewatch	·	1.2 km	MPC · JPL
417486	2006 RJ_{72}	—	September 15, 2006	Kitt Peak	Spacewatch	·	950 m	MPC · JPL
417487	2006 RV_{75}	—	September 15, 2006	Kitt Peak	Spacewatch	·	2.0 km	MPC · JPL
417488	2006 RA_{84}	—	September 15, 2006	Kitt Peak	Spacewatch	·	1.1 km	MPC · JPL
417489	2006 RW_{85}	—	September 15, 2006	Kitt Peak	Spacewatch	NYS	1.2 km	MPC · JPL
417490	2006 RL_{90}	—	September 15, 2006	Kitt Peak	Spacewatch	NYS	1.1 km	MPC · JPL
417491	2006 SH_{1}	—	August 21, 2006	Kitt Peak	Spacewatch	·	1.1 km	MPC · JPL
417492	2006 SX_{5}	—	March 7, 2005	Socorro	LINEAR	PHO	1.4 km	MPC · JPL
417493	2006 SP_{6}	—	September 16, 2006	Palomar	NEAT	·	1.3 km	MPC · JPL
417494	2006 SX_{33}	—	September 17, 2006	Catalina	CSS	·	1.2 km	MPC · JPL
417495	2006 SK_{51}	—	September 17, 2006	Anderson Mesa	LONEOS	H	600 m	MPC · JPL
417496	2006 SD_{64}	—	September 19, 2006	Siding Spring	SSS	H	610 m	MPC · JPL
417497	2006 SW_{66}	—	September 19, 2006	Kitt Peak	Spacewatch	MAS	740 m	MPC · JPL
417498	2006 SE_{71}	—	September 19, 2006	Kitt Peak	Spacewatch	·	1.4 km	MPC · JPL
417499	2006 SS_{75}	—	September 19, 2006	Kitt Peak	Spacewatch	MAS	720 m	MPC · JPL
417500	2006 SX_{112}	—	September 15, 2006	Kitt Peak	Spacewatch	·	1.0 km	MPC · JPL

== 417501–417600 ==
back to top

Designation			Discovery			Properties		Ref
Permanent	Provisional	Named after	Date	Site	Discoverer(s)	Category	Diam.	Ref
417501	2006 SN_{117}	—	September 24, 2006	Kitt Peak	Spacewatch	MAS	710 m	MPC · JPL
417502	2006 SC_{119}	—	August 18, 2006	Palomar	NEAT	NYS	1.3 km	MPC · JPL
417503	2006 SV_{127}	—	September 17, 2006	Catalina	CSS	·	2.1 km	MPC · JPL
417504	2006 SH_{185}	—	September 25, 2006	Kitt Peak	Spacewatch	·	1.2 km	MPC · JPL
417505	2006 SX_{211}	—	September 26, 2006	Mount Lemmon	Mount Lemmon Survey	H	580 m	MPC · JPL
417506	2006 SY_{221}	—	September 16, 2006	Kitt Peak	Spacewatch	·	1.1 km	MPC · JPL
417507	2006 SD_{223}	—	September 25, 2006	Mount Lemmon	Mount Lemmon Survey	·	1.0 km	MPC · JPL
417508	2006 SV_{227}	—	September 26, 2006	Kitt Peak	Spacewatch	·	1.3 km	MPC · JPL
417509	2006 SH_{259}	—	September 26, 2006	Kitt Peak	Spacewatch	MAS	660 m	MPC · JPL
417510	2006 SD_{263}	—	September 26, 2006	Mount Lemmon	Mount Lemmon Survey	·	1.1 km	MPC · JPL
417511	2006 SL_{267}	—	September 26, 2006	Kitt Peak	Spacewatch	·	1.3 km	MPC · JPL
417512	2006 SU_{271}	—	September 27, 2006	Mount Lemmon	Mount Lemmon Survey	·	1.0 km	MPC · JPL
417513	2006 SZ_{282}	—	September 26, 2006	Socorro	LINEAR	·	1.2 km	MPC · JPL
417514	2006 SW_{284}	—	September 29, 2006	Anderson Mesa	LONEOS	·	1.6 km	MPC · JPL
417515	2006 SP_{289}	—	September 19, 2006	Catalina	CSS	·	2.0 km	MPC · JPL
417516	2006 SU_{291}	—	September 19, 2006	Siding Spring	SSS	PHO	1.2 km	MPC · JPL
417517	2006 SP_{312}	—	September 27, 2006	Mount Lemmon	Mount Lemmon Survey	·	800 m	MPC · JPL
417518	2006 SQ_{329}	—	September 27, 2006	Kitt Peak	Spacewatch	·	1.2 km	MPC · JPL
417519	2006 SJ_{334}	—	September 28, 2006	Kitt Peak	Spacewatch	·	1.6 km	MPC · JPL
417520	2006 SL_{369}	—	September 18, 2006	Kitt Peak	Spacewatch	MAS	760 m	MPC · JPL
417521	2006 SY_{393}	—	September 30, 2006	Mount Lemmon	Mount Lemmon Survey	·	1.4 km	MPC · JPL
417522	2006 SY_{404}	—	September 28, 2006	Mount Lemmon	Mount Lemmon Survey	T_{j} (2.99) · 3:2	4.6 km	MPC · JPL
417523	2006 SA_{411}	—	September 25, 2006	Mount Lemmon	Mount Lemmon Survey	NYS	1.1 km	MPC · JPL
417524	2006 TQ_{17}	—	October 2, 2006	Mount Lemmon	Mount Lemmon Survey	·	1.1 km	MPC · JPL
417525	2006 TE_{27}	—	October 12, 2006	Kitt Peak	Spacewatch	·	1.2 km	MPC · JPL
417526	2006 TZ_{30}	—	October 12, 2006	Kitt Peak	Spacewatch	·	820 m	MPC · JPL
417527	2006 TD_{31}	—	September 25, 2006	Mount Lemmon	Mount Lemmon Survey	T_{j} (2.99) · 3:2 · SHU	4.6 km	MPC · JPL
417528	2006 TP_{39}	—	October 12, 2006	Kitt Peak	Spacewatch	·	1.4 km	MPC · JPL
417529	2006 TE_{45}	—	October 12, 2006	Kitt Peak	Spacewatch	·	1.1 km	MPC · JPL
417530	2006 TP_{46}	—	September 30, 2006	Mount Lemmon	Mount Lemmon Survey	·	1.5 km	MPC · JPL
417531	2006 TR_{50}	—	October 12, 2006	Kitt Peak	Spacewatch	·	820 m	MPC · JPL
417532	2006 TG_{51}	—	September 28, 2006	Mount Lemmon	Mount Lemmon Survey	·	1.0 km	MPC · JPL
417533	2006 TG_{76}	—	October 11, 2006	Palomar	NEAT	·	1.2 km	MPC · JPL
417534	2006 TC_{82}	—	October 13, 2006	Kitt Peak	Spacewatch	·	1.3 km	MPC · JPL
417535	2006 TN_{89}	—	October 13, 2006	Kitt Peak	Spacewatch	·	1.1 km	MPC · JPL
417536	2006 TZ_{99}	—	October 15, 2006	Kitt Peak	Spacewatch	·	1.6 km	MPC · JPL
417537	2006 TS_{102}	—	October 15, 2006	Kitt Peak	Spacewatch	·	1.5 km	MPC · JPL
417538	2006 TQ_{120}	—	October 12, 2006	Apache Point	A. C. Becker	·	1.2 km	MPC · JPL
417539	2006 TH_{125}	—	October 12, 2006	Kitt Peak	Spacewatch	·	970 m	MPC · JPL
417540	2006 TE_{126}	—	October 2, 2006	Mount Lemmon	Mount Lemmon Survey	·	1.2 km	MPC · JPL
417541	2006 TG_{127}	—	October 4, 2006	Mount Lemmon	Mount Lemmon Survey	·	830 m	MPC · JPL
417542	2006 UA_{8}	—	October 16, 2006	Catalina	CSS	MAS	760 m	MPC · JPL
417543	2006 UF_{28}	—	October 16, 2006	Kitt Peak	Spacewatch	·	920 m	MPC · JPL
417544	2006 UM_{33}	—	September 27, 2006	Mount Lemmon	Mount Lemmon Survey	(194)	1.8 km	MPC · JPL
417545	2006 UK_{35}	—	October 16, 2006	Catalina	CSS	H	550 m	MPC · JPL
417546	2006 UQ_{35}	—	July 15, 2005	Mount Lemmon	Mount Lemmon Survey	3:2 · SHU	4.3 km	MPC · JPL
417547	2006 UR_{35}	—	September 30, 2006	Mount Lemmon	Mount Lemmon Survey	·	1.3 km	MPC · JPL
417548	2006 UW_{44}	—	September 28, 2006	Mount Lemmon	Mount Lemmon Survey	·	900 m	MPC · JPL
417549	2006 UZ_{48}	—	October 17, 2006	Kitt Peak	Spacewatch	(2076)	900 m	MPC · JPL
417550	2006 UM_{55}	—	September 28, 2006	Mount Lemmon	Mount Lemmon Survey	H	590 m	MPC · JPL
417551	2006 UF_{60}	—	October 19, 2006	Mount Lemmon	Mount Lemmon Survey	·	1.3 km	MPC · JPL
417552	2006 UL_{78}	—	October 17, 2006	Kitt Peak	Spacewatch	·	1.0 km	MPC · JPL
417553	2006 UO_{80}	—	September 25, 2006	Mount Lemmon	Mount Lemmon Survey	·	900 m	MPC · JPL
417554	2006 US_{82}	—	October 17, 2006	Kitt Peak	Spacewatch	·	1.1 km	MPC · JPL
417555	2006 UK_{87}	—	September 27, 2006	Mount Lemmon	Mount Lemmon Survey	·	950 m	MPC · JPL
417556	2006 UP_{90}	—	October 17, 2006	Kitt Peak	Spacewatch	T_{j} (2.99) · 3:2	4.8 km	MPC · JPL
417557	2006 UT_{96}	—	October 2, 2006	Mount Lemmon	Mount Lemmon Survey	·	980 m	MPC · JPL
417558	2006 UF_{101}	—	October 3, 2006	Mount Lemmon	Mount Lemmon Survey	(5)	1 km	MPC · JPL
417559	2006 UL_{112}	—	September 16, 2006	Kitt Peak	Spacewatch	·	850 m	MPC · JPL
417560	2006 UU_{118}	—	October 19, 2006	Kitt Peak	Spacewatch	·	1.8 km	MPC · JPL
417561	2006 UN_{132}	—	October 19, 2006	Kitt Peak	Spacewatch	·	860 m	MPC · JPL
417562	2006 UJ_{142}	—	October 19, 2006	Kitt Peak	Spacewatch	·	1.3 km	MPC · JPL
417563	2006 UH_{143}	—	October 20, 2006	Kitt Peak	Spacewatch	·	1.5 km	MPC · JPL
417564	2006 UO_{156}	—	October 21, 2006	Mount Lemmon	Mount Lemmon Survey	·	1.1 km	MPC · JPL
417565	2006 UJ_{174}	—	October 19, 2006	Mount Lemmon	Mount Lemmon Survey	·	1.4 km	MPC · JPL
417566	2006 UK_{185}	—	October 28, 2006	Catalina	CSS	H	740 m	MPC · JPL
417567	2006 UT_{196}	—	October 20, 2006	Kitt Peak	Spacewatch	·	1.1 km	MPC · JPL
417568	2006 UB_{199}	—	October 20, 2006	Kitt Peak	Spacewatch	·	1.6 km	MPC · JPL
417569	2006 UR_{212}	—	October 23, 2006	Kitt Peak	Spacewatch	·	1.2 km	MPC · JPL
417570	2006 UA_{213}	—	October 23, 2006	Kitt Peak	Spacewatch	V	860 m	MPC · JPL
417571	2006 UX_{214}	—	October 17, 2006	Andrushivka	Andrushivka	·	1.9 km	MPC · JPL
417572	2006 UY_{231}	—	October 21, 2006	Kitt Peak	Spacewatch	·	2.6 km	MPC · JPL
417573	2006 UA_{234}	—	October 22, 2006	Kitt Peak	Spacewatch	·	920 m	MPC · JPL
417574	2006 UA_{254}	—	October 27, 2006	Mount Lemmon	Mount Lemmon Survey	·	950 m	MPC · JPL
417575	2006 UC_{269}	—	October 27, 2006	Mount Lemmon	Mount Lemmon Survey	·	1.7 km	MPC · JPL
417576	2006 UK_{272}	—	October 27, 2006	Mount Lemmon	Mount Lemmon Survey	·	1.2 km	MPC · JPL
417577	2006 UT_{273}	—	October 27, 2006	Kitt Peak	Spacewatch	·	1.4 km	MPC · JPL
417578	2006 UC_{291}	—	October 21, 2006	Catalina	CSS	H	710 m	MPC · JPL
417579	2006 UN_{326}	—	October 21, 2006	Catalina	CSS	PHO	1.3 km	MPC · JPL
417580	2006 UR_{338}	—	October 31, 2006	Mount Lemmon	Mount Lemmon Survey	·	2.7 km	MPC · JPL
417581	2006 VA_{3}	—	November 11, 2006	Mount Lemmon	Mount Lemmon Survey	APO +1km	1.2 km	MPC · JPL
417582	2006 VX_{3}	—	November 9, 2006	Kitt Peak	Spacewatch	·	1.5 km	MPC · JPL
417583	2006 VC_{7}	—	November 10, 2006	Kitt Peak	Spacewatch	H	500 m	MPC · JPL
417584	2006 VV_{9}	—	November 11, 2006	Mount Lemmon	Mount Lemmon Survey	·	1.1 km	MPC · JPL
417585	2006 VO_{16}	—	November 9, 2006	Kitt Peak	Spacewatch	3:2 · SHU	4.5 km	MPC · JPL
417586	2006 VN_{30}	—	November 10, 2006	Kitt Peak	Spacewatch	PHO	1.3 km	MPC · JPL
417587	2006 VF_{45}	—	November 9, 2006	Altschwendt	W. Ries	NYS	970 m	MPC · JPL
417588	2006 VH_{50}	—	November 10, 2006	Kitt Peak	Spacewatch	·	1.1 km	MPC · JPL
417589	2006 VQ_{55}	—	November 11, 2006	Kitt Peak	Spacewatch	·	910 m	MPC · JPL
417590	2006 VZ_{61}	—	October 4, 2006	Mount Lemmon	Mount Lemmon Survey	·	1.1 km	MPC · JPL
417591	2006 VE_{64}	—	November 11, 2006	Kitt Peak	Spacewatch	MAS	750 m	MPC · JPL
417592	2006 VL_{69}	—	November 11, 2006	Kitt Peak	Spacewatch	·	1.6 km	MPC · JPL
417593	2006 VB_{85}	—	November 13, 2006	Kitt Peak	Spacewatch	EUN	1.1 km	MPC · JPL
417594	2006 VF_{87}	—	November 14, 2006	Catalina	CSS	·	1.6 km	MPC · JPL
417595	2006 VS_{94}	—	October 23, 2006	Mount Lemmon	Mount Lemmon Survey	(5)	1.1 km	MPC · JPL
417596	2006 VO_{104}	—	November 13, 2006	Catalina	CSS	·	1.3 km	MPC · JPL
417597	2006 VJ_{108}	—	November 13, 2006	Kitt Peak	Spacewatch	(5)	1.0 km	MPC · JPL
417598	2006 VM_{117}	—	November 14, 2006	Kitt Peak	Spacewatch	·	1.7 km	MPC · JPL
417599	2006 VA_{125}	—	November 1, 2006	Mount Lemmon	Mount Lemmon Survey	·	950 m	MPC · JPL
417600	2006 VM_{125}	—	November 1, 2006	Mount Lemmon	Mount Lemmon Survey	·	1.0 km	MPC · JPL

== 417601–417700 ==
back to top

Designation			Discovery			Properties		Ref
Permanent	Provisional	Named after	Date	Site	Discoverer(s)	Category	Diam.	Ref
417601	2006 VR_{126}	—	November 15, 2006	Kitt Peak	Spacewatch	·	1.4 km	MPC · JPL
417602	2006 VQ_{128}	—	November 15, 2006	Kitt Peak	Spacewatch	·	960 m	MPC · JPL
417603	2006 VM_{132}	—	November 11, 2006	Mount Lemmon	Mount Lemmon Survey	·	860 m	MPC · JPL
417604	2006 VR_{138}	—	November 15, 2006	Kitt Peak	Spacewatch	·	1.3 km	MPC · JPL
417605	2006 VH_{140}	—	November 15, 2006	Kitt Peak	Spacewatch	·	1.4 km	MPC · JPL
417606	2006 VE_{148}	—	November 15, 2006	Mount Lemmon	Mount Lemmon Survey	·	1.4 km	MPC · JPL
417607	2006 WG	—	November 17, 2006	Catalina	CSS	H	400 m	MPC · JPL
417608	2006 WS_{2}	—	November 20, 2006	7300	W. K. Y. Yeung	(1547)	1.5 km	MPC · JPL
417609	2006 WD_{21}	—	November 17, 2006	Mount Lemmon	Mount Lemmon Survey	·	1.4 km	MPC · JPL
417610	2006 WK_{21}	—	November 17, 2006	Mount Lemmon	Mount Lemmon Survey	·	1.4 km	MPC · JPL
417611	2006 WY_{24}	—	November 17, 2006	Mount Lemmon	Mount Lemmon Survey	3:2	5.3 km	MPC · JPL
417612	2006 WQ_{29}	—	November 22, 2006	Mount Lemmon	Mount Lemmon Survey	APO · PHA	730 m	MPC · JPL
417613	2006 WY_{35}	—	November 16, 2006	Kitt Peak	Spacewatch	·	1.1 km	MPC · JPL
417614	2006 WP_{50}	—	November 16, 2006	Mount Lemmon	Mount Lemmon Survey	·	1.6 km	MPC · JPL
417615	2006 WQ_{51}	—	November 16, 2006	Kitt Peak	Spacewatch	·	1.2 km	MPC · JPL
417616	2006 WB_{83}	—	November 18, 2006	Socorro	LINEAR	·	1.4 km	MPC · JPL
417617	2006 WA_{88}	—	October 23, 2006	Mount Lemmon	Mount Lemmon Survey	(5)	950 m	MPC · JPL
417618	2006 WR_{93}	—	August 28, 2005	Siding Spring	SSS	T_{j} (2.99) · 3:2	5.4 km	MPC · JPL
417619	2006 WE_{127}	—	October 23, 2006	Mount Lemmon	Mount Lemmon Survey	·	1.4 km	MPC · JPL
417620	2006 WB_{131}	—	November 19, 2006	Catalina	CSS	·	2.0 km	MPC · JPL
417621	2006 WQ_{137}	—	October 28, 2006	Mount Lemmon	Mount Lemmon Survey	·	850 m	MPC · JPL
417622	2006 WO_{142}	—	November 20, 2006	Kitt Peak	Spacewatch	EUN	1.3 km	MPC · JPL
417623	2006 WW_{143}	—	November 20, 2006	Kitt Peak	Spacewatch	·	1.1 km	MPC · JPL
417624	2006 WP_{150}	—	November 20, 2006	Kitt Peak	Spacewatch	·	1.4 km	MPC · JPL
417625	2006 WU_{151}	—	November 13, 2006	Mount Lemmon	Mount Lemmon Survey	·	1.2 km	MPC · JPL
417626	2006 WD_{164}	—	November 11, 2006	Kitt Peak	Spacewatch	·	1.1 km	MPC · JPL
417627	2006 WH_{170}	—	November 23, 2006	Kitt Peak	Spacewatch	·	1.4 km	MPC · JPL
417628	2006 WW_{171}	—	November 11, 2006	Mount Lemmon	Mount Lemmon Survey	(194)	1.3 km	MPC · JPL
417629	2006 WF_{181}	—	November 24, 2006	Mount Lemmon	Mount Lemmon Survey	·	1.5 km	MPC · JPL
417630	2006 WB_{183}	—	November 24, 2006	Kitt Peak	Spacewatch	H	700 m	MPC · JPL
417631	2006 WX_{183}	—	November 25, 2006	Mount Lemmon	Mount Lemmon Survey	·	1.2 km	MPC · JPL
417632	2006 WU_{184}	—	November 27, 2006	Mount Lemmon	Mount Lemmon Survey	·	1.2 km	MPC · JPL
417633	2006 WZ_{189}	—	November 25, 2006	Catalina	CSS	·	1.7 km	MPC · JPL
417634	2006 XG_{1}	—	December 11, 2006	Catalina	CSS	APO · PHA · critical	420 m	MPC · JPL
417635	2006 XE_{8}	—	December 9, 2006	Kitt Peak	Spacewatch	·	2.6 km	MPC · JPL
417636	2006 XM_{10}	—	December 9, 2006	Kitt Peak	Spacewatch	·	1.4 km	MPC · JPL
417637	2006 XM_{16}	—	November 25, 2006	Mount Lemmon	Mount Lemmon Survey	EUN	1.2 km	MPC · JPL
417638	2006 XT_{30}	—	December 13, 2006	Kitt Peak	Spacewatch	·	1.2 km	MPC · JPL
417639	2006 XA_{37}	—	December 11, 2006	Kitt Peak	Spacewatch	·	1.8 km	MPC · JPL
417640	2006 XN_{43}	—	December 12, 2006	Mount Lemmon	Mount Lemmon Survey	·	1.4 km	MPC · JPL
417641	2006 XW_{45}	—	December 6, 2002	Socorro	LINEAR	·	1.1 km	MPC · JPL
417642	2006 XX_{53}	—	December 11, 2006	Kitt Peak	Spacewatch	·	1.1 km	MPC · JPL
417643	2006 XL_{56}	—	October 28, 2006	Mount Lemmon	Mount Lemmon Survey	V	750 m	MPC · JPL
417644	2006 XR_{56}	—	November 22, 2006	Catalina	CSS	H	620 m	MPC · JPL
417645	2006 XY_{57}	—	December 14, 2006	Mount Lemmon	Mount Lemmon Survey	·	2.1 km	MPC · JPL
417646	2006 XS_{66}	—	December 14, 2006	Palomar	NEAT	·	1.4 km	MPC · JPL
417647	2006 XF_{67}	—	December 14, 2006	Palomar	NEAT	·	1.5 km	MPC · JPL
417648	2006 XD_{70}	—	December 13, 2006	Mount Lemmon	Mount Lemmon Survey	·	1.7 km	MPC · JPL
417649	2006 XV_{70}	—	December 13, 2006	Mount Lemmon	Mount Lemmon Survey	·	2.0 km	MPC · JPL
417650	2006 XK_{71}	—	December 15, 2006	Kitt Peak	Spacewatch	·	2.1 km	MPC · JPL
417651	2006 XT_{71}	—	December 1, 2006	Kitt Peak	Spacewatch	·	1.3 km	MPC · JPL
417652	2006 XV_{72}	—	November 20, 2006	Catalina	CSS	H	710 m	MPC · JPL
417653	2006 YY_{7}	—	December 20, 2006	Palomar	NEAT	·	1.9 km	MPC · JPL
417654	2006 YW_{12}	—	November 21, 2006	Mount Lemmon	Mount Lemmon Survey	MAR	1.2 km	MPC · JPL
417655	2006 YF_{13}	—	December 26, 2006	Siding Spring	SSS	ATE	370 m	MPC · JPL
417656	2006 YL_{16}	—	December 21, 2006	Anderson Mesa	LONEOS	·	1.4 km	MPC · JPL
417657	2006 YJ_{19}	—	October 22, 2006	Mount Lemmon	Mount Lemmon Survey	(5)	1.2 km	MPC · JPL
417658	2006 YR_{20}	—	December 21, 2006	Kitt Peak	Spacewatch	·	1.1 km	MPC · JPL
417659	2006 YN_{21}	—	December 21, 2006	Kitt Peak	Spacewatch	RAF	940 m	MPC · JPL
417660	2006 YY_{25}	—	December 10, 2006	Kitt Peak	Spacewatch	ADE	2.1 km	MPC · JPL
417661	2006 YR_{30}	—	December 21, 2006	Kitt Peak	Spacewatch	·	1.4 km	MPC · JPL
417662	2006 YF_{31}	—	December 21, 2006	Kitt Peak	Spacewatch	·	1.2 km	MPC · JPL
417663	2006 YJ_{36}	—	November 21, 2006	Mount Lemmon	Mount Lemmon Survey	·	1.0 km	MPC · JPL
417664	2006 YT_{37}	—	December 21, 2006	Kitt Peak	Spacewatch	·	1.8 km	MPC · JPL
417665	2006 YZ_{43}	—	December 25, 2006	Catalina	CSS	H	730 m	MPC · JPL
417666	2006 YA_{53}	—	December 27, 2006	Mount Lemmon	Mount Lemmon Survey	(5)	1.2 km	MPC · JPL
417667	2007 AJ	—	January 8, 2007	Catalina	CSS	·	1.8 km	MPC · JPL
417668	2007 AQ	—	December 21, 2006	Mount Lemmon	Mount Lemmon Survey	·	2.4 km	MPC · JPL
417669	2007 AH_{2}	—	January 8, 2007	Kitt Peak	Spacewatch	·	2.0 km	MPC · JPL
417670	2007 AV_{4}	—	January 8, 2007	Mount Lemmon	Mount Lemmon Survey	·	1.0 km	MPC · JPL
417671	2007 AQ_{6}	—	January 8, 2007	Kitt Peak	Spacewatch	H	700 m	MPC · JPL
417672	2007 AJ_{7}	—	January 9, 2007	Mount Lemmon	Mount Lemmon Survey	(5)	1.4 km	MPC · JPL
417673	2007 AV_{10}	—	November 27, 2006	Mount Lemmon	Mount Lemmon Survey	JUN	1.2 km	MPC · JPL
417674	2007 AO_{13}	—	January 9, 2007	Mount Lemmon	Mount Lemmon Survey	·	1.0 km	MPC · JPL
417675	2007 AD_{14}	—	December 14, 2006	Mount Lemmon	Mount Lemmon Survey	·	2.2 km	MPC · JPL
417676	2007 AC_{17}	—	December 13, 2006	Kitt Peak	Spacewatch	·	2.7 km	MPC · JPL
417677	2007 AJ_{20}	—	January 10, 2007	Kitt Peak	Spacewatch	·	1.4 km	MPC · JPL
417678	2007 AO_{20}	—	December 25, 2006	Catalina	CSS	·	1.4 km	MPC · JPL
417679	2007 AN_{21}	—	January 15, 2007	Catalina	CSS	·	1.2 km	MPC · JPL
417680	2007 AO_{28}	—	January 9, 2007	Mount Lemmon	Mount Lemmon Survey	·	1.1 km	MPC · JPL
417681	2007 AZ_{28}	—	January 10, 2007	Kitt Peak	Spacewatch	·	810 m	MPC · JPL
417682	2007 AX_{30}	—	January 9, 2007	Mount Lemmon	Mount Lemmon Survey	·	880 m	MPC · JPL
417683	2007 AH_{31}	—	January 10, 2007	Charleston	Astronomical Research Observatory	·	1.8 km	MPC · JPL
417684	2007 BN_{4}	—	January 16, 2007	Catalina	CSS	H	780 m	MPC · JPL
417685	2007 BK_{5}	—	December 24, 2006	Catalina	CSS	(5)	1.2 km	MPC · JPL
417686	2007 BV_{8}	—	January 17, 2007	Kitt Peak	Spacewatch	·	1.7 km	MPC · JPL
417687	2007 BM_{14}	—	January 17, 2007	Kitt Peak	Spacewatch	·	1.8 km	MPC · JPL
417688	2007 BY_{24}	—	November 21, 2006	Mount Lemmon	Mount Lemmon Survey	·	900 m	MPC · JPL
417689	2007 BQ_{34}	—	November 20, 2006	Mount Lemmon	Mount Lemmon Survey	T_{j} (2.98) · 3:2	5.0 km	MPC · JPL
417690	2007 BG_{42}	—	January 16, 2007	Socorro	LINEAR	·	1.2 km	MPC · JPL
417691	2007 BM_{47}	—	January 26, 2007	Kitt Peak	Spacewatch	·	1.8 km	MPC · JPL
417692	2007 BM_{51}	—	January 10, 2007	Kitt Peak	Spacewatch	·	1.4 km	MPC · JPL
417693	2007 BF_{52}	—	January 24, 2007	Kitt Peak	Spacewatch	·	1.2 km	MPC · JPL
417694	2007 BA_{55}	—	November 27, 2006	Mount Lemmon	Mount Lemmon Survey	·	940 m	MPC · JPL
417695	2007 BF_{55}	—	November 1, 2006	Mount Lemmon	Mount Lemmon Survey	·	1.2 km	MPC · JPL
417696	2007 BE_{56}	—	June 4, 2005	Catalina	CSS	H	720 m	MPC · JPL
417697	2007 BZ_{57}	—	January 24, 2007	Socorro	LINEAR	·	2.1 km	MPC · JPL
417698	2007 BD_{58}	—	January 24, 2007	Catalina	CSS	JUN	1.4 km	MPC · JPL
417699	2007 BZ_{59}	—	January 26, 2007	Anderson Mesa	LONEOS	·	1.4 km	MPC · JPL
417700	2007 BU_{63}	—	January 27, 2007	Mount Lemmon	Mount Lemmon Survey	·	1.5 km	MPC · JPL

== 417701–417800 ==
back to top

Designation			Discovery			Properties		Ref
Permanent	Provisional	Named after	Date	Site	Discoverer(s)	Category	Diam.	Ref
417701	2007 BU_{64}	—	January 27, 2007	Mount Lemmon	Mount Lemmon Survey	PAD	1.8 km	MPC · JPL
417702	2007 BZ_{67}	—	January 27, 2007	Kitt Peak	Spacewatch	·	2.3 km	MPC · JPL
417703	2007 BL_{68}	—	November 25, 2006	Mount Lemmon	Mount Lemmon Survey	·	1.6 km	MPC · JPL
417704	2007 BK_{71}	—	January 28, 2007	Mount Lemmon	Mount Lemmon Survey	·	1.3 km	MPC · JPL
417705	2007 BU_{74}	—	January 27, 2007	Mount Lemmon	Mount Lemmon Survey	·	1.7 km	MPC · JPL
417706	2007 BB_{78}	—	January 27, 2007	Kitt Peak	Spacewatch	·	2.0 km	MPC · JPL
417707	2007 BT_{78}	—	January 27, 2007	Mount Lemmon	Mount Lemmon Survey	·	1.0 km	MPC · JPL
417708	2007 BQ_{90}	—	January 19, 2007	Mauna Kea	Mauna Kea	·	1.7 km	MPC · JPL
417709	2007 BG_{95}	—	December 14, 2006	Mount Lemmon	Mount Lemmon Survey	EUN	1.0 km	MPC · JPL
417710	2007 CP_{9}	—	February 6, 2007	Palomar	NEAT	(5)	1.3 km	MPC · JPL
417711	2007 CY_{9}	—	December 21, 2006	Mount Lemmon	Mount Lemmon Survey	·	1.2 km	MPC · JPL
417712	2007 CJ_{10}	—	November 28, 2006	Mount Lemmon	Mount Lemmon Survey	·	1.2 km	MPC · JPL
417713	2007 CK_{10}	—	February 6, 2007	Mount Lemmon	Mount Lemmon Survey	·	1.4 km	MPC · JPL
417714	2007 CT_{11}	—	November 22, 2006	Mount Lemmon	Mount Lemmon Survey	EUN	1.4 km	MPC · JPL
417715	2007 CJ_{14}	—	February 7, 2007	Kitt Peak	Spacewatch	·	1.8 km	MPC · JPL
417716	2007 CM_{15}	—	January 17, 2007	Catalina	CSS	·	1.4 km	MPC · JPL
417717	2007 CZ_{15}	—	February 6, 2007	Palomar	NEAT	·	1.4 km	MPC · JPL
417718	2007 CL_{21}	—	February 6, 2007	Palomar	NEAT	·	2.2 km	MPC · JPL
417719	2007 CQ_{21}	—	November 21, 2006	Mount Lemmon	Mount Lemmon Survey	·	2.0 km	MPC · JPL
417720	2007 CY_{21}	—	November 22, 2006	Mount Lemmon	Mount Lemmon Survey	·	1.1 km	MPC · JPL
417721	2007 CP_{22}	—	February 6, 2007	Mount Lemmon	Mount Lemmon Survey	·	1.8 km	MPC · JPL
417722	2007 CV_{23}	—	February 7, 2007	Palomar	NEAT	·	880 m	MPC · JPL
417723	2007 CR_{25}	—	December 24, 2006	Kitt Peak	Spacewatch	·	2.4 km	MPC · JPL
417724	2007 CD_{29}	—	November 22, 2006	Mount Lemmon	Mount Lemmon Survey	·	2.1 km	MPC · JPL
417725	2007 CQ_{32}	—	January 10, 2007	Mount Lemmon	Mount Lemmon Survey	T_{j} (2.95) · 3:2	6.7 km	MPC · JPL
417726	2007 CJ_{37}	—	February 6, 2007	Mount Lemmon	Mount Lemmon Survey	EUN	1.4 km	MPC · JPL
417727	2007 CP_{38}	—	January 27, 2007	Kitt Peak	Spacewatch	·	2.4 km	MPC · JPL
417728	2007 CS_{41}	—	December 23, 2006	Mount Lemmon	Mount Lemmon Survey	·	1.6 km	MPC · JPL
417729	2007 CY_{41}	—	December 27, 2006	Mount Lemmon	Mount Lemmon Survey	·	1.9 km	MPC · JPL
417730	2007 CS_{42}	—	February 7, 2007	Mount Lemmon	Mount Lemmon Survey	·	1.5 km	MPC · JPL
417731	2007 CW_{43}	—	August 25, 2001	Kitt Peak	Spacewatch	·	1.0 km	MPC · JPL
417732	2007 CX_{43}	—	February 8, 2007	Kitt Peak	Spacewatch	·	1.5 km	MPC · JPL
417733	2007 CO_{48}	—	February 10, 2007	Mount Lemmon	Mount Lemmon Survey	·	1.3 km	MPC · JPL
417734	2007 CR_{52}	—	January 17, 2007	Catalina	CSS	·	2.1 km	MPC · JPL
417735	2007 CN_{53}	—	February 15, 2007	Catalina	CSS	·	1.9 km	MPC · JPL
417736	2007 CP_{55}	—	February 13, 2007	Mount Lemmon	Mount Lemmon Survey	·	1.2 km	MPC · JPL
417737	2007 CM_{59}	—	February 10, 2007	Catalina	CSS	·	2.1 km	MPC · JPL
417738	2007 CQ_{61}	—	February 15, 2007	Palomar	NEAT	·	1.4 km	MPC · JPL
417739	2007 CZ_{65}	—	November 29, 2000	Kitt Peak	Spacewatch	·	2.5 km	MPC · JPL
417740	2007 CS_{75}	—	February 14, 2007	Mauna Kea	Mauna Kea	·	1.4 km	MPC · JPL
417741	2007 CM_{79}	—	October 1, 2005	Kitt Peak	Spacewatch	·	1.4 km	MPC · JPL
417742	2007 DG	—	February 16, 2007	Mayhill	Lowe, A.	H	880 m	MPC · JPL
417743	2007 DZ_{3}	—	February 16, 2007	Mount Lemmon	Mount Lemmon Survey	·	930 m	MPC · JPL
417744	2007 DH_{5}	—	February 17, 2007	Kitt Peak	Spacewatch	·	2.1 km	MPC · JPL
417745	2007 DL_{9}	—	December 20, 2006	Mount Lemmon	Mount Lemmon Survey	·	3.6 km	MPC · JPL
417746	2007 DA_{13}	—	October 27, 2006	Mount Lemmon	Mount Lemmon Survey	·	1.3 km	MPC · JPL
417747	2007 DX_{15}	—	February 17, 2007	Kitt Peak	Spacewatch	·	1.4 km	MPC · JPL
417748	2007 DC_{16}	—	February 17, 2007	Kitt Peak	Spacewatch	·	1.8 km	MPC · JPL
417749	2007 DG_{19}	—	February 17, 2007	Kitt Peak	Spacewatch	·	1.2 km	MPC · JPL
417750	2007 DP_{20}	—	January 28, 2007	Mount Lemmon	Mount Lemmon Survey	·	1.7 km	MPC · JPL
417751	2007 DE_{40}	—	February 19, 2007	Kitt Peak	Spacewatch	·	1.9 km	MPC · JPL
417752	2007 DP_{40}	—	February 19, 2007	Mount Lemmon	Mount Lemmon Survey	·	1.6 km	MPC · JPL
417753	2007 DH_{44}	—	February 17, 2007	Mount Lemmon	Mount Lemmon Survey	EUN	930 m	MPC · JPL
417754	2007 DV_{45}	—	January 25, 2007	Kitt Peak	Spacewatch	·	1.0 km	MPC · JPL
417755	2007 DR_{46}	—	December 13, 2006	Kitt Peak	Spacewatch	·	1.5 km	MPC · JPL
417756	2007 DO_{47}	—	February 21, 2007	Mount Lemmon	Mount Lemmon Survey	L5	10 km	MPC · JPL
417757	2007 DR_{49}	—	February 16, 2007	Catalina	CSS	·	970 m	MPC · JPL
417758	2007 DK_{50}	—	February 6, 2007	Kitt Peak	Spacewatch	·	2.4 km	MPC · JPL
417759	2007 DZ_{50}	—	January 28, 2007	Mount Lemmon	Mount Lemmon Survey	·	1.4 km	MPC · JPL
417760	2007 DP_{56}	—	February 21, 2007	Mount Lemmon	Mount Lemmon Survey	·	1.8 km	MPC · JPL
417761	2007 DR_{59}	—	February 22, 2007	Anderson Mesa	LONEOS	·	2.2 km	MPC · JPL
417762	2007 DR_{66}	—	February 21, 2007	Kitt Peak	Spacewatch	·	860 m	MPC · JPL
417763	2007 DF_{69}	—	February 21, 2007	Kitt Peak	Spacewatch	·	1.3 km	MPC · JPL
417764	2007 DK_{84}	—	February 25, 2007	Mount Lemmon	Mount Lemmon Survey	·	1.5 km	MPC · JPL
417765	2007 DK_{92}	—	February 23, 2007	Kitt Peak	Spacewatch	·	2.3 km	MPC · JPL
417766	2007 DS_{92}	—	February 23, 2007	Kitt Peak	Spacewatch	NEM	2.2 km	MPC · JPL
417767	2007 DX_{96}	—	February 23, 2007	Kitt Peak	Spacewatch	L5	7.8 km	MPC · JPL
417768	2007 DF_{101}	—	February 26, 2007	Mount Lemmon	Mount Lemmon Survey	·	950 m	MPC · JPL
417769	2007 DF_{110}	—	February 16, 2007	Catalina	CSS	·	2.1 km	MPC · JPL
417770	2007 DN_{112}	—	February 25, 2007	Kitt Peak	Spacewatch	·	4.9 km	MPC · JPL
417771	2007 DG_{113}	—	February 19, 2007	Catalina	CSS	·	1.8 km	MPC · JPL
417772	2007 DV_{113}	—	February 23, 2007	Mount Lemmon	Mount Lemmon Survey	·	2.2 km	MPC · JPL
417773	2007 DZ_{115}	—	February 25, 2007	Mount Lemmon	Mount Lemmon Survey	·	1.4 km	MPC · JPL
417774	2007 EY_{4}	—	February 25, 2007	Mount Lemmon	Mount Lemmon Survey	·	930 m	MPC · JPL
417775	2007 ED_{5}	—	March 9, 2007	Mount Lemmon	Mount Lemmon Survey	·	1.6 km	MPC · JPL
417776	2007 ED_{13}	—	March 9, 2007	Mount Lemmon	Mount Lemmon Survey	·	1.9 km	MPC · JPL
417777	2007 ES_{13}	—	March 9, 2007	Palomar	NEAT	·	1.9 km	MPC · JPL
417778	2007 EE_{21}	—	February 25, 2007	Mount Lemmon	Mount Lemmon Survey	·	1.2 km	MPC · JPL
417779	2007 ET_{23}	—	March 10, 2007	Mount Lemmon	Mount Lemmon Survey	·	2.4 km	MPC · JPL
417780	2007 EX_{32}	—	March 10, 2007	Kitt Peak	Spacewatch	·	2.4 km	MPC · JPL
417781	2007 EA_{33}	—	March 10, 2007	Mount Lemmon	Mount Lemmon Survey	·	1.1 km	MPC · JPL
417782	2007 EM_{35}	—	March 11, 2007	Kitt Peak	Spacewatch	·	2.3 km	MPC · JPL
417783	2007 EL_{41}	—	March 23, 2003	Kitt Peak	Spacewatch	·	1.4 km	MPC · JPL
417784	2007 EW_{41}	—	March 9, 2007	Mount Lemmon	Mount Lemmon Survey	·	2.2 km	MPC · JPL
417785	2007 EZ_{57}	—	March 9, 2007	Mount Lemmon	Mount Lemmon Survey	·	1.1 km	MPC · JPL
417786	2007 EP_{72}	—	March 10, 2007	Kitt Peak	Spacewatch	·	2.2 km	MPC · JPL
417787	2007 EK_{77}	—	March 10, 2007	Mount Lemmon	Mount Lemmon Survey	·	1.4 km	MPC · JPL
417788	2007 EV_{78}	—	February 26, 2007	Mount Lemmon	Mount Lemmon Survey	·	2.4 km	MPC · JPL
417789	2007 EM_{79}	—	March 10, 2007	Kitt Peak	Spacewatch	·	1.8 km	MPC · JPL
417790	2007 EK_{87}	—	March 13, 2007	Kitt Peak	Spacewatch	·	2.1 km	MPC · JPL
417791	2007 ED_{88}	—	March 9, 2007	Mount Lemmon	Mount Lemmon Survey	·	2.2 km	MPC · JPL
417792	2007 ED_{95}	—	March 10, 2007	Mount Lemmon	Mount Lemmon Survey	·	2.4 km	MPC · JPL
417793	2007 EA_{109}	—	March 11, 2007	Kitt Peak	Spacewatch	·	2.1 km	MPC · JPL
417794	2007 EL_{119}	—	March 13, 2007	Mount Lemmon	Mount Lemmon Survey	·	2.2 km	MPC · JPL
417795	2007 ES_{120}	—	March 14, 2007	Anderson Mesa	LONEOS	·	2.5 km	MPC · JPL
417796	2007 EJ_{121}	—	December 27, 2006	Mount Lemmon	Mount Lemmon Survey	EUN	1.4 km	MPC · JPL
417797	2007 ER_{131}	—	March 9, 2007	Mount Lemmon	Mount Lemmon Survey	·	1.6 km	MPC · JPL
417798	2007 EX_{133}	—	March 9, 2007	Mount Lemmon	Mount Lemmon Survey	AGN	1.2 km	MPC · JPL
417799	2007 EU_{134}	—	December 15, 2006	Mount Lemmon	Mount Lemmon Survey	JUN	1.2 km	MPC · JPL
417800	2007 EC_{146}	—	December 23, 2006	Mount Lemmon	Mount Lemmon Survey	·	890 m	MPC · JPL

== 417801–417900 ==
back to top

Designation			Discovery			Properties		Ref
Permanent	Provisional	Named after	Date	Site	Discoverer(s)	Category	Diam.	Ref
417801	2007 EV_{146}	—	March 12, 2007	Mount Lemmon	Mount Lemmon Survey	·	1.7 km	MPC · JPL
417802	2007 EF_{152}	—	March 12, 2007	Mount Lemmon	Mount Lemmon Survey	AGN	1.5 km	MPC · JPL
417803	2007 EQ_{166}	—	March 11, 2007	Catalina	CSS	·	1.4 km	MPC · JPL
417804	2007 EU_{167}	—	February 19, 2007	Mount Lemmon	Mount Lemmon Survey	(5)	1.2 km	MPC · JPL
417805	2007 EV_{169}	—	March 14, 2007	Kitt Peak	Spacewatch	·	2.1 km	MPC · JPL
417806	2007 ED_{171}	—	November 21, 2006	Mount Lemmon	Mount Lemmon Survey	(5)	990 m	MPC · JPL
417807	2007 EV_{187}	—	March 15, 2007	Catalina	CSS	·	2.3 km	MPC · JPL
417808	2007 EJ_{192}	—	March 14, 2007	Kitt Peak	Spacewatch	GEF	1.4 km	MPC · JPL
417809	2007 EN_{193}	—	March 14, 2007	Mount Lemmon	Mount Lemmon Survey	·	1.5 km	MPC · JPL
417810	2007 EW_{205}	—	March 12, 2007	Kitt Peak	Spacewatch	·	2.0 km	MPC · JPL
417811	2007 EB_{206}	—	March 12, 2007	Mount Lemmon	Mount Lemmon Survey	·	1.5 km	MPC · JPL
417812	2007 EC_{210}	—	March 8, 2007	Palomar	NEAT	·	1.3 km	MPC · JPL
417813	2007 EJ_{212}	—	November 17, 2006	Kitt Peak	Spacewatch	·	2.5 km	MPC · JPL
417814	2007 EN_{216}	—	March 14, 2007	Anderson Mesa	LONEOS	·	2.1 km	MPC · JPL
417815	2007 EL_{217}	—	March 11, 2007	Mount Lemmon	Mount Lemmon Survey	·	1.7 km	MPC · JPL
417816	2007 FA	—	March 16, 2007	Catalina	CSS	APO · PHA	310 m	MPC · JPL
417817	2007 FX_{2}	—	December 15, 2006	Mount Lemmon	Mount Lemmon Survey	·	4.0 km	MPC · JPL
417818	2007 FT_{11}	—	March 17, 2007	Kitt Peak	Spacewatch	·	1.2 km	MPC · JPL
417819	2007 FQ_{15}	—	March 11, 2007	Catalina	CSS	·	1.6 km	MPC · JPL
417820	2007 FX_{20}	—	March 24, 2007	Bergisch Gladbach	W. Bickel	·	1.6 km	MPC · JPL
417821	2007 FF_{22}	—	March 20, 2007	Kitt Peak	Spacewatch	·	2.0 km	MPC · JPL
417822	2007 FJ_{23}	—	March 20, 2007	Kitt Peak	Spacewatch	·	1.8 km	MPC · JPL
417823	2007 FQ_{29}	—	March 20, 2007	Mount Lemmon	Mount Lemmon Survey	AGN	1.1 km	MPC · JPL
417824	2007 FU_{29}	—	March 20, 2007	Socorro	LINEAR	·	2.6 km	MPC · JPL
417825	2007 FM_{32}	—	March 20, 2007	Kitt Peak	Spacewatch	·	2.1 km	MPC · JPL
417826	2007 FR_{38}	—	March 25, 2007	Mount Lemmon	Mount Lemmon Survey	·	2.2 km	MPC · JPL
417827	2007 FG_{39}	—	March 20, 2007	Catalina	CSS	·	1.5 km	MPC · JPL
417828	2007 FA_{47}	—	March 19, 2007	Mount Lemmon	Mount Lemmon Survey	·	2.5 km	MPC · JPL
417829	2007 FS_{48}	—	January 28, 2006	Kitt Peak	Spacewatch	L5	7.8 km	MPC · JPL
417830	2007 FE_{49}	—	March 20, 2007	Mount Lemmon	Mount Lemmon Survey	L5	8.3 km	MPC · JPL
417831	2007 FP_{49}	—	March 26, 2007	Catalina	CSS	EUN	1.5 km	MPC · JPL
417832	2007 FV_{49}	—	March 26, 2007	Catalina	CSS	·	2.9 km	MPC · JPL
417833	2007 GG_{4}	—	April 7, 2007	Catalina	CSS	·	2.3 km	MPC · JPL
417834	2007 GH_{5}	—	March 25, 2007	Mount Lemmon	Mount Lemmon Survey	·	2.6 km	MPC · JPL
417835	2007 GK_{32}	—	February 21, 2007	Mount Lemmon	Mount Lemmon Survey	GEF	1.2 km	MPC · JPL
417836	2007 GP_{41}	—	April 14, 2007	Kitt Peak	Spacewatch	·	1.3 km	MPC · JPL
417837	2007 GZ_{52}	—	April 14, 2007	Mount Lemmon	Mount Lemmon Survey	·	1.4 km	MPC · JPL
417838	2007 GU_{56}	—	March 15, 2007	Kitt Peak	Spacewatch	NAE	2.3 km	MPC · JPL
417839	2007 GD_{65}	—	April 15, 2007	Kitt Peak	Spacewatch	EUN	1.6 km	MPC · JPL
417840	2007 GJ_{74}	—	April 15, 2007	Catalina	CSS	·	1.3 km	MPC · JPL
417841	2007 GT_{76}	—	April 7, 2007	Catalina	CSS	EUN	1.7 km	MPC · JPL
417842	2007 GF_{77}	—	April 11, 2007	Catalina	CSS	·	2.4 km	MPC · JPL
417843	2007 HS_{1}	—	April 16, 2007	Catalina	CSS	·	1.8 km	MPC · JPL
417844	2007 HP_{8}	—	April 18, 2007	Mount Lemmon	Mount Lemmon Survey	L5	7.3 km	MPC · JPL
417845	2007 HT_{32}	—	April 19, 2007	Kitt Peak	Spacewatch	·	1.9 km	MPC · JPL
417846	2007 HL_{40}	—	April 20, 2007	Kitt Peak	Spacewatch	·	1.7 km	MPC · JPL
417847	2007 HR_{46}	—	April 20, 2007	Kitt Peak	Spacewatch	·	3.0 km	MPC · JPL
417848	2007 HZ_{51}	—	April 20, 2007	Kitt Peak	Spacewatch	·	2.3 km	MPC · JPL
417849	2007 HG_{57}	—	April 22, 2007	Mount Lemmon	Mount Lemmon Survey	·	2.3 km	MPC · JPL
417850	2007 HV_{58}	—	April 23, 2007	Catalina	CSS	·	2.4 km	MPC · JPL
417851	2007 HQ_{60}	—	April 20, 2007	Kitt Peak	Spacewatch	·	2.0 km	MPC · JPL
417852	2007 HL_{61}	—	April 20, 2007	Kitt Peak	Spacewatch	DOR	2.2 km	MPC · JPL
417853	2007 HS_{96}	—	April 20, 2007	Kitt Peak	Spacewatch	BRA	1.6 km	MPC · JPL
417854	2007 JM	—	April 25, 2007	Mount Lemmon	Mount Lemmon Survey	·	2.5 km	MPC · JPL
417855	2007 JN	—	May 7, 2007	Mount Lemmon	Mount Lemmon Survey	·	4.9 km	MPC · JPL
417856	2007 JZ	—	May 6, 2007	Purple Mountain	PMO NEO Survey Program	T_{j} (2.96)	4.4 km	MPC · JPL
417857	2007 JE_{9}	—	May 9, 2007	Catalina	CSS	·	1.3 km	MPC · JPL
417858	2007 JK_{11}	—	March 14, 2007	Mount Lemmon	Mount Lemmon Survey	·	2.4 km	MPC · JPL
417859	2007 JX_{12}	—	May 7, 2007	Kitt Peak	Spacewatch	·	4.3 km	MPC · JPL
417860	2007 JK_{16}	—	May 10, 2007	Goodricke-Pigott	R. A. Tucker	·	2.7 km	MPC · JPL
417861	2007 JW_{17}	—	April 25, 2007	Mount Lemmon	Mount Lemmon Survey	·	2.7 km	MPC · JPL
417862	2007 JX_{23}	—	April 25, 2007	Mount Lemmon	Mount Lemmon Survey	·	2.0 km	MPC · JPL
417863	2007 JN_{45}	—	May 12, 2007	Mount Lemmon	Mount Lemmon Survey	·	2.9 km	MPC · JPL
417864	2007 KQ_{3}	—	March 25, 2007	Mount Lemmon	Mount Lemmon Survey	·	1.9 km	MPC · JPL
417865	2007 LA_{28}	—	March 25, 2007	Mount Lemmon	Mount Lemmon Survey	·	2.2 km	MPC · JPL
417866	2007 LY_{33}	—	June 8, 2007	Kitt Peak	Spacewatch	·	6.1 km	MPC · JPL
417867	2007 MO	—	June 16, 2007	Siding Spring	SSS	·	2.8 km	MPC · JPL
417868	2007 MX_{2}	—	June 16, 2007	Kitt Peak	Spacewatch	·	4.0 km	MPC · JPL
417869	2007 MO_{6}	—	June 16, 2007	Kitt Peak	Spacewatch	·	2.4 km	MPC · JPL
417870	2007 ME_{9}	—	June 19, 2007	Kitt Peak	Spacewatch	T_{j} (2.99)	3.7 km	MPC · JPL
417871	2007 MB_{24}	—	June 24, 2007	Socorro	LINEAR	APO · PHA	760 m	MPC · JPL
417872	2007 ND_{1}	—	July 8, 2007	Reedy Creek	J. Broughton	·	3.9 km	MPC · JPL
417873	2007 NJ_{4}	—	July 14, 2007	Dauban	Chante-Perdrix	·	770 m	MPC · JPL
417874	2007 NC_{5}	—	July 4, 2007	Mount Lemmon	Mount Lemmon Survey	T_{j} (2.72) · APO +1km · critical	840 m	MPC · JPL
417875	2007 OG_{1}	—	July 18, 2007	Socorro	LINEAR	·	8.5 km	MPC · JPL
417876	2007 PX_{7}	—	August 10, 2007	Reedy Creek	J. Broughton	·	750 m	MPC · JPL
417877	2007 PP_{19}	—	August 9, 2007	Kitt Peak	Spacewatch	·	630 m	MPC · JPL
417878	2007 PV_{21}	—	August 9, 2007	Socorro	LINEAR	·	690 m	MPC · JPL
417879	2007 PY_{23}	—	August 12, 2007	Socorro	LINEAR	·	3.9 km	MPC · JPL
417880	2007 PG_{26}	—	August 11, 2007	Socorro	LINEAR	·	800 m	MPC · JPL
417881	2007 PB_{46}	—	August 10, 2007	Kitt Peak	Spacewatch	·	580 m	MPC · JPL
417882	2007 PS_{48}	—	August 11, 2007	Siding Spring	SSS	·	1.7 km	MPC · JPL
417883	2007 QR_{3}	—	August 23, 2007	Andrushivka	Andrushivka	·	4.0 km	MPC · JPL
417884	2007 QB_{12}	—	August 21, 2007	Bisei SG Center	BATTeRS	·	830 m	MPC · JPL
417885	2007 QZ_{16}	—	August 16, 2007	Socorro	LINEAR	·	690 m	MPC · JPL
417886	2007 RF_{6}	—	September 5, 2007	Dauban	C. Rinner, F. Kugel	·	800 m	MPC · JPL
417887	2007 RT_{10}	—	September 7, 2007	Socorro	LINEAR	·	610 m	MPC · JPL
417888	2007 RN_{11}	—	September 10, 2007	Dauban	Chante-Perdrix	·	1.1 km	MPC · JPL
417889	2007 RO_{16}	—	September 2, 2007	Catalina	CSS	·	5.3 km	MPC · JPL
417890	2007 RD_{27}	—	September 4, 2007	Mount Lemmon	Mount Lemmon Survey	·	480 m	MPC · JPL
417891	2007 RL_{32}	—	September 5, 2007	Catalina	CSS	·	3.8 km	MPC · JPL
417892	2007 RQ_{34}	—	September 6, 2007	Anderson Mesa	LONEOS	·	510 m	MPC · JPL
417893	2007 RX_{38}	—	September 8, 2007	Anderson Mesa	LONEOS	·	710 m	MPC · JPL
417894	2007 RW_{40}	—	September 9, 2007	Kitt Peak	Spacewatch	·	610 m	MPC · JPL
417895	2007 RN_{43}	—	September 9, 2007	Kitt Peak	Spacewatch	V	730 m	MPC · JPL
417896	2007 RU_{44}	—	September 9, 2007	Kitt Peak	Spacewatch	·	3.2 km	MPC · JPL
417897	2007 RJ_{54}	—	September 9, 2007	Kitt Peak	Spacewatch	·	840 m	MPC · JPL
417898	2007 RL_{73}	—	September 10, 2007	Mount Lemmon	Mount Lemmon Survey	·	730 m	MPC · JPL
417899	2007 RR_{98}	—	September 10, 2007	Kitt Peak	Spacewatch	·	730 m	MPC · JPL
417900	2007 RE_{102}	—	September 11, 2007	Catalina	CSS	·	3.9 km	MPC · JPL

== 417901–418000 ==
back to top

Designation			Discovery			Properties		Ref
Permanent	Provisional	Named after	Date	Site	Discoverer(s)	Category	Diam.	Ref
417901	2007 RN_{105}	—	September 11, 2007	Catalina	CSS	·	660 m	MPC · JPL
417902	2007 RY_{109}	—	August 24, 2001	Kitt Peak	Spacewatch	·	2.9 km	MPC · JPL
417903	2007 RZ_{111}	—	September 11, 2007	Mount Lemmon	Mount Lemmon Survey	·	570 m	MPC · JPL
417904	2007 RO_{113}	—	September 11, 2007	Kitt Peak	Spacewatch	·	3.0 km	MPC · JPL
417905	2007 RL_{136}	—	September 14, 2007	Mount Lemmon	Mount Lemmon Survey	·	3.5 km	MPC · JPL
417906	2007 RW_{138}	—	October 23, 1997	Kitt Peak	Spacewatch	·	530 m	MPC · JPL
417907	2007 RU_{141}	—	September 12, 2007	Mount Lemmon	Mount Lemmon Survey	·	650 m	MPC · JPL
417908	2007 RZ_{141}	—	September 11, 2007	Mount Lemmon	Mount Lemmon Survey	(2076)	810 m	MPC · JPL
417909	2007 RT_{143}	—	September 3, 2000	Apache Point	SDSS	·	640 m	MPC · JPL
417910	2007 RQ_{145}	—	September 14, 2007	Socorro	LINEAR	·	1 km	MPC · JPL
417911	2007 RR_{149}	—	September 12, 2007	Catalina	CSS	·	910 m	MPC · JPL
417912	2007 RX_{157}	—	September 11, 2007	XuYi	PMO NEO Survey Program	·	750 m	MPC · JPL
417913	2007 RC_{158}	—	September 12, 2007	Catalina	CSS	·	770 m	MPC · JPL
417914	2007 RZ_{164}	—	September 10, 2007	Kitt Peak	Spacewatch	V	510 m	MPC · JPL
417915	2007 RL_{172}	—	September 10, 2007	Kitt Peak	Spacewatch	·	3.4 km	MPC · JPL
417916	2007 RW_{199}	—	September 13, 2007	Kitt Peak	Spacewatch	·	600 m	MPC · JPL
417917	2007 RS_{201}	—	September 13, 2007	Kitt Peak	Spacewatch	·	650 m	MPC · JPL
417918	2007 RZ_{204}	—	September 9, 2007	Kitt Peak	Spacewatch	·	820 m	MPC · JPL
417919	2007 RO_{211}	—	September 8, 2007	Anderson Mesa	LONEOS	NYS	1.2 km	MPC · JPL
417920	2007 RB_{215}	—	September 12, 2007	Kitt Peak	Spacewatch	·	710 m	MPC · JPL
417921	2007 RJ_{215}	—	September 12, 2007	Kitt Peak	Spacewatch	CYB	3.6 km	MPC · JPL
417922	2007 RF_{220}	—	September 14, 2007	Mount Lemmon	Mount Lemmon Survey	·	730 m	MPC · JPL
417923	2007 RQ_{233}	—	September 12, 2007	Catalina	CSS	·	820 m	MPC · JPL
417924	2007 RG_{236}	—	August 16, 2007	XuYi	PMO NEO Survey Program	·	770 m	MPC · JPL
417925	2007 RS_{244}	—	September 11, 2007	Kitt Peak	Spacewatch	·	680 m	MPC · JPL
417926	2007 RV_{269}	—	September 15, 2007	Kitt Peak	Spacewatch	·	650 m	MPC · JPL
417927	2007 RG_{278}	—	September 5, 2007	Catalina	CSS	·	3.4 km	MPC · JPL
417928	2007 RX_{288}	—	September 15, 2007	Mount Lemmon	Mount Lemmon Survey	·	960 m	MPC · JPL
417929	2007 RE_{289}	—	September 10, 2007	Mount Lemmon	Mount Lemmon Survey	·	800 m	MPC · JPL
417930	2007 RW_{290}	—	September 14, 2007	Mount Lemmon	Mount Lemmon Survey	CYB	5.0 km	MPC · JPL
417931	2007 RG_{293}	—	September 13, 2007	Mount Lemmon	Mount Lemmon Survey	·	590 m	MPC · JPL
417932	2007 RU_{298}	—	September 10, 2007	Mount Lemmon	Mount Lemmon Survey	(2076)	690 m	MPC · JPL
417933	2007 RY_{308}	—	September 9, 2007	Kitt Peak	Spacewatch	·	590 m	MPC · JPL
417934	2007 RU_{310}	—	September 12, 2007	Catalina	CSS	·	740 m	MPC · JPL
417935	2007 RG_{315}	—	September 8, 2007	Anderson Mesa	LONEOS	·	670 m	MPC · JPL
417936	2007 RT_{317}	—	September 11, 2007	XuYi	PMO NEO Survey Program	·	610 m	MPC · JPL
417937	2007 RM_{322}	—	September 12, 2007	Catalina	CSS	·	710 m	MPC · JPL
417938	2007 RK_{325}	—	September 15, 2007	Mount Lemmon	Mount Lemmon Survey	·	860 m	MPC · JPL
417939	2007 SU_{3}	—	September 16, 2007	Socorro	LINEAR	·	1.0 km	MPC · JPL
417940	2007 SE_{4}	—	September 17, 2007	Socorro	LINEAR	·	850 m	MPC · JPL
417941	2007 SL_{7}	—	September 18, 2007	Kitt Peak	Spacewatch	·	800 m	MPC · JPL
417942	2007 SJ_{10}	—	September 19, 2007	Kitt Peak	Spacewatch	·	490 m	MPC · JPL
417943	2007 SH_{13}	—	September 19, 2007	Kitt Peak	Spacewatch	·	3.4 km	MPC · JPL
417944	2007 SS_{18}	—	September 25, 2007	Mount Lemmon	Mount Lemmon Survey	·	890 m	MPC · JPL
417945	2007 TL_{10}	—	September 12, 2007	Mount Lemmon	Mount Lemmon Survey	·	760 m	MPC · JPL
417946	2007 TN_{10}	—	October 6, 2007	Socorro	LINEAR	·	810 m	MPC · JPL
417947	2007 TJ_{16}	—	October 7, 2007	Črni Vrh	Skvarč, J.	·	810 m	MPC · JPL
417948	2007 TY_{19}	—	October 6, 2007	Socorro	LINEAR	·	880 m	MPC · JPL
417949	2007 TB_{23}	—	October 10, 2007	Catalina	CSS	AMO · APO · PHA	610 m	MPC · JPL
417950	2007 TL_{33}	—	October 6, 2007	Kitt Peak	Spacewatch	·	1.0 km	MPC · JPL
417951	2007 TU_{47}	—	October 4, 2007	Kitt Peak	Spacewatch	·	1.6 km	MPC · JPL
417952	2007 TQ_{49}	—	September 5, 2007	Mount Lemmon	Mount Lemmon Survey	·	540 m	MPC · JPL
417953	2007 TM_{68}	—	October 12, 2007	7300	W. K. Y. Yeung	CYB	5.8 km	MPC · JPL
417954	2007 TY_{69}	—	October 10, 2007	Goodricke-Pigott	R. A. Tucker	·	670 m	MPC · JPL
417955 Mallama	2007 TE_{74}	Mallama	October 14, 2007	Front Royal	Skillman, D. R.	CYB	4.4 km	MPC · JPL
417956	2007 TW_{74}	—	October 15, 2007	Bisei SG Center	BATTeRS	·	900 m	MPC · JPL
417957	2007 TF_{77}	—	October 5, 2007	Kitt Peak	Spacewatch	·	730 m	MPC · JPL
417958	2007 TE_{87}	—	October 8, 2007	Mount Lemmon	Mount Lemmon Survey	·	670 m	MPC · JPL
417959	2007 TP_{87}	—	October 8, 2007	Mount Lemmon	Mount Lemmon Survey	·	1.3 km	MPC · JPL
417960	2007 TW_{92}	—	October 6, 2007	Kitt Peak	Spacewatch	·	630 m	MPC · JPL
417961	2007 TS_{104}	—	September 10, 2007	Mount Lemmon	Mount Lemmon Survey	·	820 m	MPC · JPL
417962	2007 TD_{106}	—	October 6, 2007	Wise	Wise	·	840 m	MPC · JPL
417963	2007 TQ_{109}	—	September 20, 2007	Catalina	CSS	·	880 m	MPC · JPL
417964	2007 TL_{113}	—	October 8, 2007	Anderson Mesa	LONEOS	·	750 m	MPC · JPL
417965	2007 TH_{114}	—	October 8, 2007	Catalina	CSS	·	640 m	MPC · JPL
417966	2007 TX_{119}	—	October 9, 2007	Purple Mountain	PMO NEO Survey Program	·	820 m	MPC · JPL
417967	2007 TB_{121}	—	October 5, 2007	Kitt Peak	Spacewatch	VER	2.6 km	MPC · JPL
417968	2007 TP_{127}	—	October 6, 2007	Kitt Peak	Spacewatch	NYS	1.2 km	MPC · JPL
417969	2007 TV_{140}	—	October 9, 2007	Mount Lemmon	Mount Lemmon Survey	·	720 m	MPC · JPL
417970	2007 TL_{142}	—	September 14, 2007	Mount Lemmon	Mount Lemmon Survey	CYB	3.4 km	MPC · JPL
417971	2007 TC_{155}	—	October 9, 2007	Socorro	LINEAR	·	850 m	MPC · JPL
417972	2007 TW_{156}	—	October 10, 2007	Kitt Peak	Spacewatch	·	720 m	MPC · JPL
417973	2007 TF_{165}	—	October 11, 2007	Socorro	LINEAR	·	810 m	MPC · JPL
417974	2007 TX_{167}	—	October 12, 2007	Socorro	LINEAR	·	690 m	MPC · JPL
417975	2007 TD_{168}	—	October 12, 2007	Socorro	LINEAR	·	680 m	MPC · JPL
417976	2007 TA_{172}	—	October 13, 2007	Socorro	LINEAR	·	880 m	MPC · JPL
417977	2007 TM_{173}	—	September 3, 2000	Kitt Peak	Spacewatch	·	580 m	MPC · JPL
417978 Haslehner	2007 TY_{184}	Haslehner	October 13, 2007	Gaisberg	Gierlinger, R.	·	3.2 km	MPC · JPL
417979	2007 TW_{186}	—	October 13, 2007	Socorro	LINEAR	·	850 m	MPC · JPL
417980	2007 TP_{193}	—	August 24, 2007	Kitt Peak	Spacewatch	·	2.7 km	MPC · JPL
417981	2007 TP_{216}	—	October 7, 2007	Kitt Peak	Spacewatch	·	920 m	MPC · JPL
417982	2007 TL_{217}	—	October 7, 2007	Kitt Peak	Spacewatch	·	600 m	MPC · JPL
417983	2007 TY_{217}	—	October 7, 2007	Kitt Peak	Spacewatch	V	650 m	MPC · JPL
417984	2007 TO_{221}	—	October 9, 2007	Kitt Peak	Spacewatch	·	720 m	MPC · JPL
417985	2007 TH_{224}	—	September 5, 2007	Mount Lemmon	Mount Lemmon Survey	·	3.3 km	MPC · JPL
417986	2007 TU_{229}	—	September 9, 2007	Mount Lemmon	Mount Lemmon Survey	·	550 m	MPC · JPL
417987	2007 TO_{234}	—	October 8, 2007	Kitt Peak	Spacewatch	·	760 m	MPC · JPL
417988	2007 TW_{274}	—	October 11, 2007	Kitt Peak	Spacewatch	·	780 m	MPC · JPL
417989	2007 TN_{275}	—	October 11, 2007	Catalina	CSS	·	780 m	MPC · JPL
417990	2007 TO_{284}	—	October 9, 2007	Mount Lemmon	Mount Lemmon Survey	·	570 m	MPC · JPL
417991	2007 TP_{302}	—	October 12, 2007	Kitt Peak	Spacewatch	·	680 m	MPC · JPL
417992	2007 TJ_{346}	—	October 13, 2007	Mount Lemmon	Mount Lemmon Survey	·	770 m	MPC · JPL
417993	2007 TG_{356}	—	October 11, 2007	Lulin	LUSS	·	580 m	MPC · JPL
417994	2007 TV_{360}	—	October 15, 2007	Mount Lemmon	Mount Lemmon Survey	VER	3.2 km	MPC · JPL
417995	2007 TM_{368}	—	August 10, 2007	Kitt Peak	Spacewatch	·	700 m	MPC · JPL
417996	2007 TZ_{372}	—	August 10, 2007	Kitt Peak	Spacewatch	·	2.4 km	MPC · JPL
417997	2007 TC_{378}	—	September 21, 2007	XuYi	PMO NEO Survey Program	·	710 m	MPC · JPL
417998	2007 TL_{384}	—	October 14, 2007	Mount Lemmon	Mount Lemmon Survey	(2076)	610 m	MPC · JPL
417999	2007 TG_{400}	—	October 15, 2007	Catalina	CSS	·	810 m	MPC · JPL
418000	2007 TY_{400}	—	September 10, 2007	Mount Lemmon	Mount Lemmon Survey	·	710 m	MPC · JPL

back to top

== Meaning of names ==
As minor planet discoveries are confirmed, they are given a permanent number by the IAU's Minor Planet Center (MPC), and the discoverers can then submit names for them, following the IAU's naming conventions. The list below concerns those minor planets in the specified number-range that have received names, and explains the meanings of those names.

Official naming citations of newly named small Solar System bodies are approved and published in a bulletin by IAU's Working Group for Small Bodies Nomenclature (WGSBN). Before May 2021, citations were published in MPC's Minor Planet Circulars for many decades. Recent citations can also be found on the JPL Small-Body Database (SBDB). Until his death in 2016, German astronomer Lutz D. Schmadel compiled these citations into the Dictionary of Minor Planet Names (DMP) and regularly updated the collection.

Based on Paul Herget's The Names of the Minor Planets, Schmadel also researched the unclear origin of numerous asteroids, most of which had been named prior to World War II. This article incorporates text from this source, which is in the public domain: SBDB New namings may only be added to this list below after official publication as the preannouncement of names is condemned. The WGSBN publishes a comprehensive guideline for the naming rules of non-cometary small Solar System bodies.

Named minor planet	Provisional	This minor planet was named for...	Ref · Catalog
417955 Mallama	2007 TE_{74}	Anthony Mallama (born 1949) is known for his research on the brightness and variability of all eight planets in the Solar System. These investigations revealed important characteristics of their atmospheres, surfaces and interiors.	JPL · 417955
417978 Haslehner	2007 TY_{184}	The Haslehner family, who are the neighbors of the Gaisberg Observatory (B21) in Schärding, Austria. It was only with their support that it was possible to build the observatory.	JPL · 417978
