= Dirk Willems =

Dutch Anabaptist martyr (died 1569)

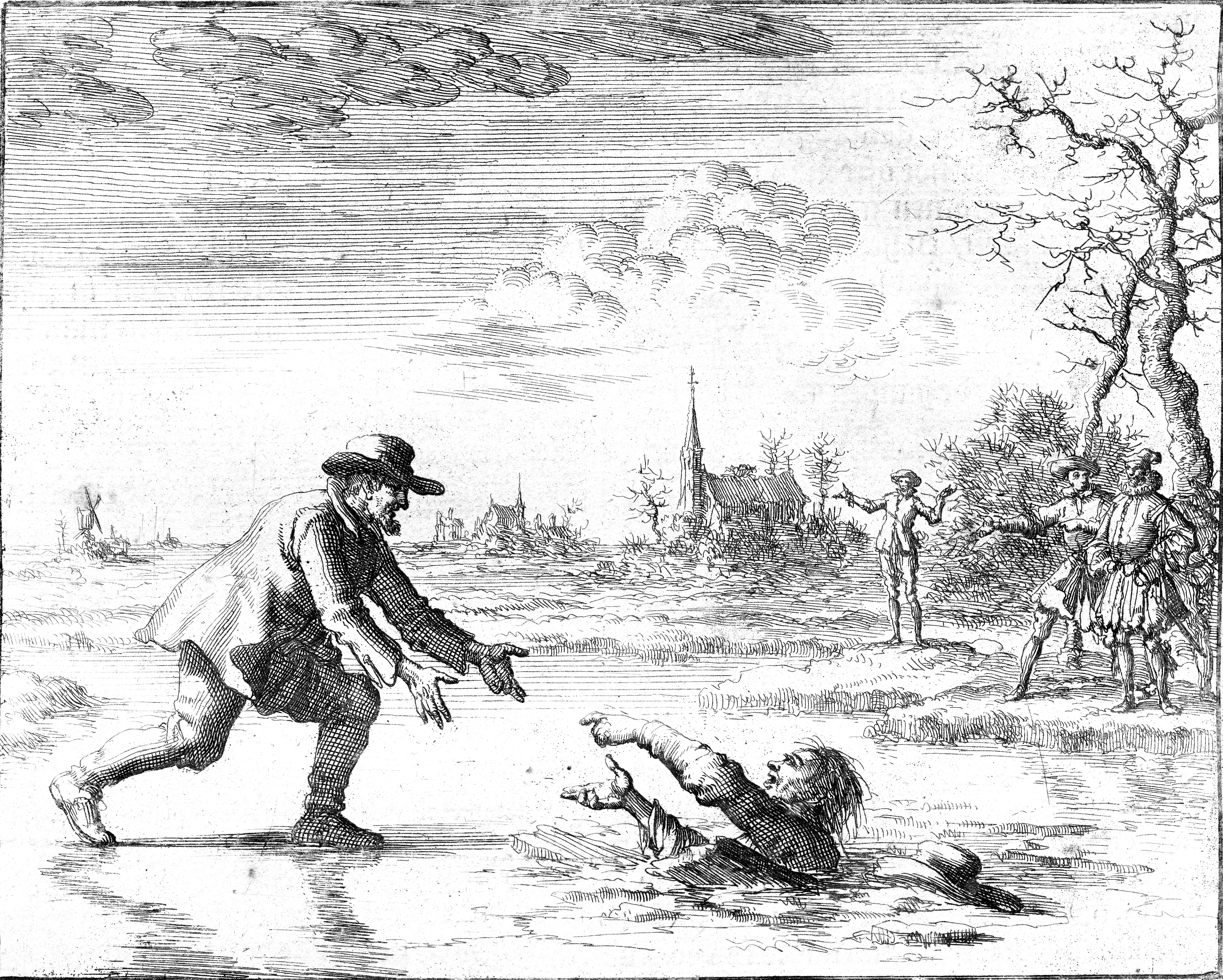
Dirk Willems saves his pursuer in this etching from the 1685 edition of Martyrs Mirror.

Dirk Willems (Dutch pronunciation: [ˈdɪr(ə)k ˈʋɪləms]; also spelled Durk Willems; died 16 May 1569) was a Dutch Anabaptist martyr most famous for escaping from prison but then turning back to rescue his pursuer—who had fallen through thin ice while chasing Willems—only to be recaptured, tortured, and killed for his beliefs.

== Life ==
Willems was born in Asperen, Gelderland (then under the Duchy of Guelders in the Holy Roman Empire), in the current Netherlands. He was subject to a believers' baptism, i.e. "rebaptized" (which made him an "Anabaptist" in the eyes of officials) as a young man in Rotterdam, thus rejecting the infant baptism, practiced at that time by both Catholics and established Protestants in the Netherlands, which he would have received previously. This action, plus his continued devotion to his new faith and the baptism of several other people in his home, led to his condemnation by the Catholic Church in the Netherlands and subsequent arrest in Asperen in 1569.

Willems was held in a residential palace turned into a prison, from which he escaped using a rope made out of knotted rags. He climbed out of the prison onto the frozen moat. A guard noticed his escape and gave chase. Willems was able to traverse the thin ice of a frozen pond, the Hondegat, because of his lighter weight after subsisting on prison rations. However, the pursuing guard fell through the ice and yelled for help as he struggled in the icy water. Willems turned back to save the life of his pursuer and thus was recaptured. His former pursuer stated his desire to let Willems go, but the burgomaster "reminded the pursuer of his oath", causing the pursuer to seize Willems.

Willems was thereafter held until he was condemned by a group of seven judges, who, quoting Willems' "persisting obstinately in his opinion", ordered that he be burned at the stake on 16 May 1569, as well as that all his property be confiscated "for the benefit of his royal majesty". Willems was executed in Asperen. With a strong eastward wind blowing, the fire was driven away from the condemned's upper body, thus prolonging his torturous death. It was reported that the wind carried his screams all the way to nearby Leerdam, where he was heard to have exclaimed things such as "O Lord; my God", etc., over seventy times. The bailiff on horseback nearby was so saddened by Willems' suffering that he said to the executioner, "Dispatch the man with a quick death." Though it is not known if the executioner obeyed this request, it is known that Willems eventually died there, "with great steadfastness", and "having commended his soul into the hands of God".

== Legacy ==
Today, he is one of the most celebrated martyrs among Anabaptists, which includes Mennonites and Amish, as well as a folk hero among modern residents of Asperen.

== Portrayals ==
Heinz Gaugel included a portrayal of Willems' rescue of his pursuer in his 1992 cyclorama Behalt, now housed at the Amish and Mennonite Heritage Center in Ohio.

In 2018, a statue of Dirk Willems was unveiled at the Mennonite Heritage Village museum in Steinbach, Manitoba.

== See also ==
- No good deed goes unpunished
