= Amish country =

Amish country may refer to:

- Ohio Amish Country, in Holmes County, Ohio, the highest concentration of Amish in the world; see Amish in Ohio
- Pennsylvania Dutch Country, the largest population of Amish in the United States
- Illinois Amish Country, along Illinois Route 133
- Northern Indiana Amish Country, in Elkhart and LaGrange Counties
- Amish settlements in other areas; see Amish § Population and distribution
