= Hiland High School =

Location
- 4400 State Route 39; Berlin, Ohio 44610; United States
- Coordinates: 40°32′54″N 81°46′52″W

Information
- Type: Public
- Established: 1958
- School district: East Holmes Local Schools
- Superintendent: Erik Beun
- Principal: Tyler Renner
- Grades: 7-12
- Average class size: 75
- Colors: Black and red
- Athletics conference: Inter-Valley Conference
- Team name: Hawks
- Athletic Director: Seger Bonifant
- Website: www.eastholmes.k12.oh.us

Hiland High School is a public high school in Berlin, Ohio, United States. It is the only high school in the East Holmes Local Schools, Athletic teams are known as the Hawks. Hiland has received multiple excellent ratings from the state since 2001.

== Athletics ==
=== State championships ===
- Boys basketball – 1992, 2011, 2012, 2026
- Girls basketball – 2000, 2005, 2006, 2008, 2017, 2021
- Boys baseball – 2016, 2023, 2024, 2025
- Boys golf – 2019, 2021

== Notable alumni ==
- Nate Torrence, comedian, actor
