= Tobe Amish =

The Tobe Amish, also called Tobe Hochstetler Amish, Old Order Tobe Amish or just Old Order Tobe to distinguish them from the New Order Tobe Amish, are a small subgroup of the Old Order Amish, that emerged in 1940 through a split from the Troyer Amish. They live in Ohio.

== History ==
The Tobe Amish have their roots in the most conservative Amish subgroup, the Swartzentruber Amish, who split from the Old Order mainstream in a process from 1913 to 1917. In 1932 the somewhat less conservative Troyer Amish split from the Swartzentrubers and in 1940 the Tobe Church split from the Troyers. The more progressive group that left the Troyers in 1940 was led by minister Tobias (Tobe) Hochstetler, who was accused of dishonesty in a business dealing. The group led by Hochstetler consisted mostly of his extended family, comprising only some 5 to 6 nuclear families. In 1967 there was another split from which the New Order Tobe Amish emerged.

== Population and congregations ==
In 2011 the Old Order Tobe Amish had 10 church districts in 4 settlements. According to Kraybill et al. the defection rate of their young people is 6.1 percent.
