= Deskaheh =

Haudenosaunee statesman (1873–1925)

Levi General
- Deskaheh (Note: Cayuga: Dehsgáhe:ˀ "Dehsgáhe:ˀ" is a Haudenosaunee Confederacy chiefly name, but the press mistakenly applied it as a given name, adapted in English as "Deskaheh".)
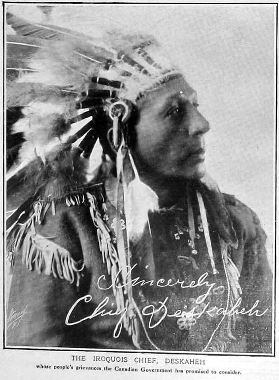
- Photograph of Chief Deskaheh appearing in 'The Graphic', 1922

Dehsgáhe:ˀ
- In office 1917–1925

Personal details
- Born: Levi General; March 15, 1873 Tuscarora Township, Ontario
- Died: June 27, 1925 (aged 52) Tuscarora Reservation, New York
- Spouse: Mary Bergen
- Relations: Seven brothers and sisters, including Alex General
- Children: Four daughters, including Rachel General
- Parents: William General (Cayuga); Lydia Burnham (Oneida)

Levi General (March 15, 1873 – June 27, 1925), commonly known as Deskaheh, was a Haudenosaunee (Iroquois) hereditary chief and appointed speaker noted for his persistent efforts to get recognition for his people. He is most famous for bringing Haudenosaunee concerns before the League of Nations in the 1920s.

== Early life ==
Levi General was raised and educated as a traditional Cayuga, participating actively in longhouse ceremonies. In addition to his first language, Cayuga, he also spoke the other Iroquoian languages. He worked as a lumberjack in the Allegheny Mountains in western New York and Pennsylvania. An accident forced him to return and he began to farm near Millpond, in the vicinity of Ohsweken on the Six Nations Reserve, where he married and had four daughters.

== Speaker of the Six Nations Council ==
In 1917, General became a hereditary Royaner of the Cayuga with the title "Dehsgáhe:ˀ", meaning "more than eleven". Deskaheh travelled to London in August 1921 with attorney George P. Decker, who was hired by the Six Nations as counsel. Because the Canadian government would have denied him permission to travel, the Six Nations Confederacy issued their own passport for Deskaheh at the advice of Decker. Deskaheh appeared at the Hippodrome "in full regalia" and also distributed a pamphlet entitled "Petition and Case of the Six Nations of the Grand River". Winston Churchill, British undersecretary for the colonies at the time, stated the petition should be returned to the Canadian government, so Decker and Deskaheh returned to the United States.

In 1922, the two men went to Washington, DC and gained the support of the Netherlands' minister of foreign affairs, H. A. van Karnebeck, who sent their petition to the League of Nations' Secretary-General's office. They also gained the support of the Swiss Bureau International pour la Défense des Indigènes.

In 1923, Canadian officials built Royal Canadian Mounted Police barracks on Six Nations Grand River lands, conducted searches of private homes, and prohibited the Indians from cutting wood for fuel (while allowing others to do so), intensifying the Indians' desire to seek protection from the British crown. Deskaheh travelled to Rochester, New York and began strategizing with Decker to ask the League of Nations to place sanctions on Canada.

On July 14, 1923, Deskaheh and Decker sailed to Geneva, Switzerland. Decker returned to the U.S. after a brief time but communicated with Deskaheh frequently by mail. Meanwhile, Deskaheh remained in Switzerland for eighteen months, lecturing before large audiences in Geneva, Bern, Lausanne, Lucerne, Winterthur, and Zurich. In his lectures, he reminded European colonizers of the new world of their obligations under the Two Row Wampum Treaty, the most significant pact made between the Haudenosaunee and Europeans. His eloquence, persistence, and ability to speak French helped win the support of some nations, including Ireland, Panama, Persia, Japan, and Estonia. Modern historian Laurence Hauptman wrote that while Deskaheh's lectures generated a warm reception by the Swiss people, they were not effective in changing British or Canadian positions.

On September 17, 1924, Governor-General Julian Byng, 1st Viscount Byng of Vimy mandated the Six Nations Confederacy Council at Ohsweken be replaced with an elected council as described by Canada's Indian Act. On October 7, as the result of a report by Andrew Thorburn Thompson who had been asked by the Royal Canadian Mounted Police to investigate the situation, the RCMP dissolved the traditional government of the Six Nations, stealing important documents and wampums and declaring an immediate election to displace the traditional government. Although Deskaheh became even more outspoken as a result of these events, even writing to King George V directly, he was unable to make headway and was never able to meet his original goal of speaking to the League of Nations, although he left a copy of a proclamation at their offices in Geneva before he left on January 3, 1925.

Deskaheh lived his last six months in Rochester, delivering speeches including his most famous one on March 10, 1925 via the local Rochester radio station. In this speech he made a statement regarding policies of "forced acculturation" that has been much-quoted since:

"Over in Ottawa, they call that policy "Indian Advancement". Over in Washington, they call it "Assimilation." We who would be the helpless victims say it is tyranny. If this must go on to the bitter end, we would rather that you come with your guns and poison gases and get rid of us that way. Do it openly and above board."

== Death and legacy ==
Deskaheh was staying at the home of Chief Clinton Rickard on the Tuscarora Reservation during the final months of pneumonia that followed a bad cold he had contracted in Europe. "He sent for his traditional medicine man from the Six Nations Reserve in Canada. But the medicine man was not allowed across the border. The U.S. had just passed the Immigration Law of 1924, which denied entry to anyone who did not speak English." On his deathbed, "Deskaheh told Rickard to 'Fight for the line.'" Chief Rickard went on to found the Indian Defense League in 1925, to defend "the right of free passage for Aboriginal people".

Deskaheh was buried on June 30 on the Six Nations Reserve, with two thousand mourners accompanying his casket to the cemetery after a ceremony at Sour Spring Longhouse. Modern Haudenosaunee consider Deskaheh a great patriot, but some also hold him responsible for the later retaliation of the Canadian government against the tribe.
