= Clinton Rickard =

Tuscarora chief

- Ro-Wa-Da-Gah-Rah-Deh, ("Loud Voice")
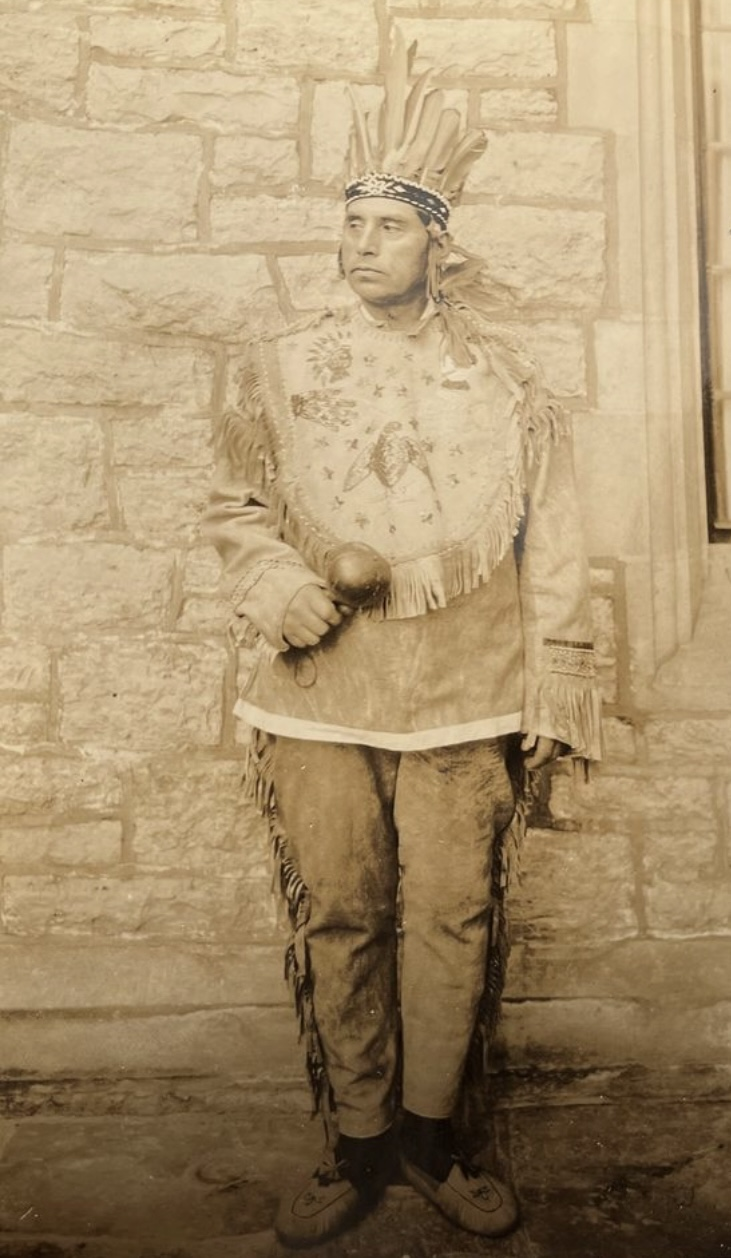
- Rickard in 1914

Personal details
- Born: May 19, 1882 Niagara County, New York
- Died: June 14, 1971 (aged 89) Buffalo, New York
- Resting place: Mount Hope Cemetery, Lewiston, New York
- Spouse(s): Elizabeth Patterson, Beulah M Mt Pleasant
- Children: William C, Edwin Clarkson, Ralph M and Elizabeth Rickard; Beverly Rickard Hill
- Parent(s): George David Rickard and Lucy (Garlow) Rickard

Clinton Rickard (1882–1971) was a Tuscarora chief known for founding the Indian Defense League, and for promoting Native American sovereignty. He worked for free passage of Native Americans across the US–Canada border, and to prevent the flooding of the Tuscarora Reservation.

== Biography ==
Rickard was born 19 May 1882 on the Tuscarora Reservation in New York to George and Lucy Rickard "Clinton was one of ten soldiers detailed to protect Vice President Theodore Roosevelt on a visit to Buffalo in 1901. He later served with distinction in the US Cavalry during the Philippine insurrection after the Spanish–American War."

He became a farmer, and was described as "plain-spoken."

In 1926, Chief Clinton Rickards founded the Indian Defense League with Chief David Hill, Jr. and Sophie Martin. The purpose of the League is "to promote unrestricted travel across the international border between the United States and Canada." "Chief Rickard always preached the sovereignty of Indian nations as national entities apart from the United States or Canada. Focused on defending the border rights guaranteed by the Jay Treaty, Rickard always stood firm on the principle that all Six Nations Indians were citizens of their own nations."

"Chief Rickard started the annual border-crossing ceremony to certify rights of Indians to cross the border free from fees or obstruction from either Canadian or American governments."

Deskaheh was influential in Rickard's commitment to the cause of free passage across the border.

While staying at Chief Rickard's house on the Tuscarora Reservation (in New York state) Deskaheh fell ill and sent for his traditional medicine man from the Six Nations Reserve in Canada. But the medicine man was not allowed across the border. The U.S. had just passed the Immigration Law of 1924, which denied entry to anyone who did not speak English ...

Although the measure was directed against Asians, covertly it allowed for the barring of North American Indians & thus the traditionally raised medicine man, who did not pass the English test since he only spoke his own language. He didn't make it to Deskaheh, who eventually died in Chief Rickard's house.

On his deathbed in June 1925, Deskaheh told Rickard to "Fight for the line". Later that summer during the Six Nations Chiefs Council National Picnic the chosen successors to Deskaheh's work were: Chauncey Garlow (Mohawk) Alexander J. General (Cayuga) Robert Henhawk (Onondaga) & Clinton Rickard (Tuscarora) & so he devoted his life to defending the right of free passage for Aboriginal people.

In World War II, Rickard urged Native Americans volunteering to join the Armed Forces to do so as Native Americans, rather than as U.S. citizens:

"The Nationality Act, passed by Congress in 1940, not only conferred citizenship on American Indians (even though they had been granted citizenship in 1924), but required that Indian men register for the draft. Passage of the Act was opposed by the Indian Defense League of America. Tuscarora leader Clinton Rickard urged those who wished to volunteer for the armed services do so as alien non-residents."

"In 1958 the Power Authority of New York announced plans to flood approximately one-fifth of [the Tuscarora Reservation] ... Chief Clinton Rickard was one of the leaders in the ensuing demonstrations and legal battles, which the Tuscarorans eventually lost."

He always wore "a buckskin suit and a large feather headdress through the 1960s when he attended public events."

== Quote ==
“In 1930 a serious threat faced our Six Nations people in the form of the Snell Bill in Congress, which would give control of our Six Nations to New York State. We Indians have always feared being under the thumb of the state rather than continuing our relationship with the federal government because it is a well-known fact that those white people who live closest to Indians are always the most prejudiced against them and the most desirous of obtaining their lands. We have always had a better chance of obtaining justice from Washington than from the state or local government. Also in turning us over to the state, the federal government would be downgrading our significance as a people and ignoring the fact that our treaties are with the United States.

== Legacy ==
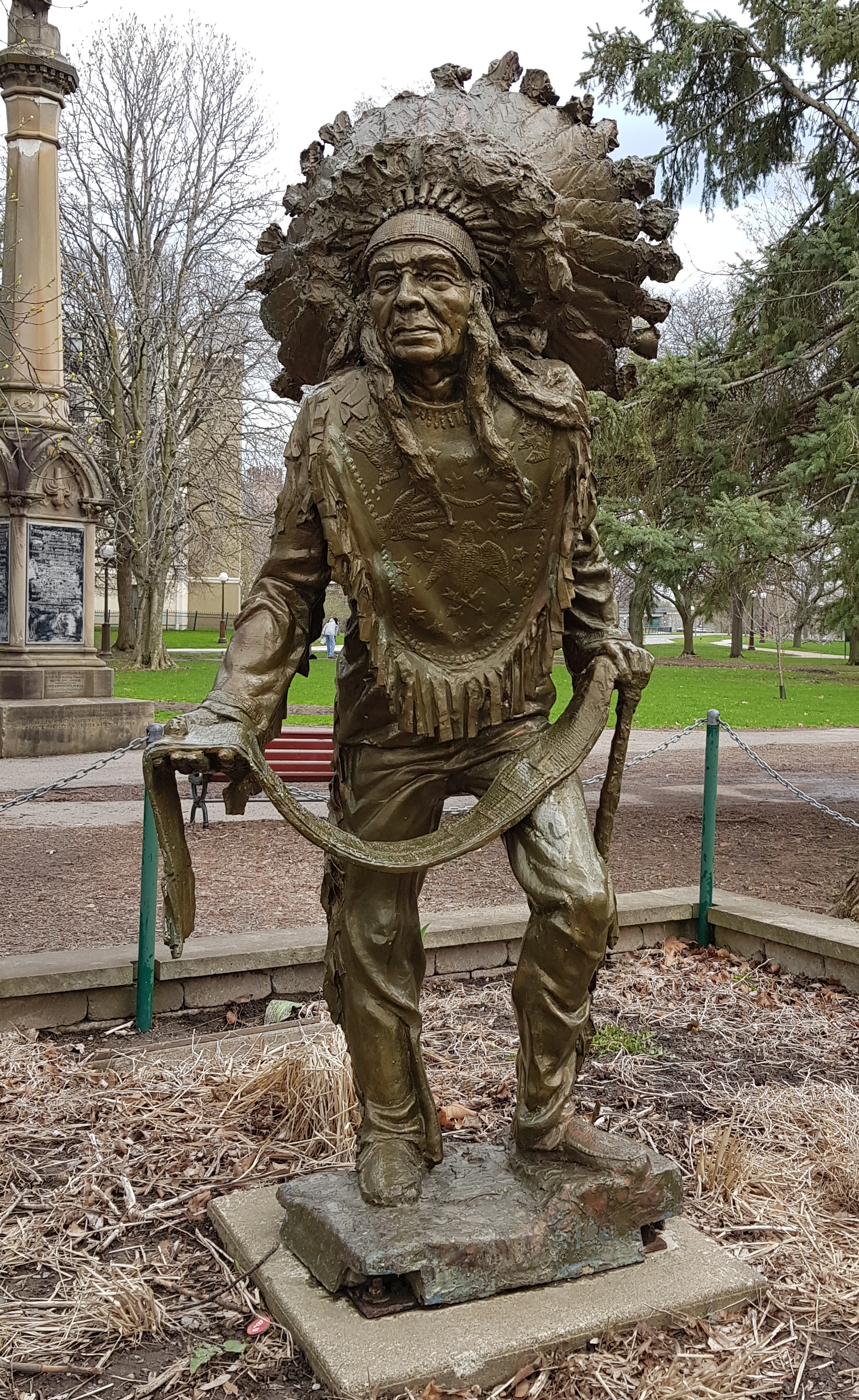
Statue by Heinz Gaugel

A statue of Chief Clinton Rickard by Heinz Gaugel is located "near the Great Lakes Gardens in Niagara Falls State Park."

An audio clip of Chief Rickard speaking in the Tuscarora language, "On the enlistment of a group of Tuscarora soldiers," is available on the American Philosophical Society website.

In December 1904, Rickard married Ivy Onstott (19 November 1889 – 25 February 1913) with whom he had two children, Edith Leona Rickard Hill (23 October 1905 – 25 October 1970) and Herald (23 August 1909 – 25 March 1913). In 1916, Clinton married his second wife, Elizabeth Patterson (9 January 1897 – 19 April 1929) and they had three sons: William C. Rickard (6 August 1918-September 18, 1964), Edwin Clarkson "Clark" Rickard (21 February 1921-11 November 1995), and Ralph M. Rickard (14 April 1923 – 20 February 1924).

In 1931, Rickard married Beulah Mt. Pleasant (7 March 1911 – 30 December 1992) with whom he had eight children: Charles Curtis Rickard (1932–1945), Beverly Rickard Hill (28 February 1935 – 8 March 2010), Onalee Rickard Cooper (1936), Enid Rickard (7 March 1940 – 27 March 2000), Norton E. Rickard (28 December 1942 – 13 October 2009), Lois Rickard Henry (24 March 1945 – June 23, 2014), Eli Rickard and Karen Rickard Jacobson.

His son William and daughter Karen were active in protests from the late 1950s throughout the 1960s. Both participated in the American Indian Charter Convention in Chicago in 1961 and Karen went later that summer to Gallup, New Mexico to help found the National Indian Youth Council. His daughter Onalee Cooper is an active advocate for hearing-impaired Native Americans. His daughter, Beverly Rickard Hill, and granddaughter, Jolene Rickard, have continued his work.
