= Heinz Gaugel =

German-Canadian artist (1927–2000)

- Born: August 25, 1927; Germany
- Died: December 8, 2000 (aged 73)
- Notable work: Behalt

Heinz Gaugel (August 25, 1927 – December 28, 2000) was a German-Canadian artist. He created multiple installations in the US and Canada, the most well-known of which is the Behalt cyclorama at the Amish and Mennonite Heritage Center (AMHC) in Holmes County, Ohio.

== Early life and education ==
Heinz Gaugel was born August 25, 1927, in Eybach in the Black Forest region of Germany, where he grew up speaking Swabish, a dialect similar to the Pennsylvania Dutch spoken by most Amish. He had a brother. He began painting at the age of twelve and was self-taught.

== Military service ==
Gaugel was drafted into the German army during World War II in 1944, when he was 17, sent to the Western Front, and fought in the Battle of the Bulge. As Gaugel described it, "We had guns from World War I and a few rounds of ammunition each – that's it." Most of his unit were killed in the battle. He was wounded, captured by the American forces, and taken to a field hospital. As he describes it:

I was absolutely petrified. I could hear people around me screaming in pain and begging ... (an) American nurse came up to me, took out a stick of gum, ripped it in half, and took half for herself and gave half to me. Just that small act of kindness really made an impression on me".

He spent the rest of the war as a prisoner of war, including four months in a prison camp, where he described intense unrelenting hunger "for months on end".

== Career ==
Gaugel emigrated to Canada in 1951. He worked as an accountant, then in 1953 started painting professionally, painting multiple murals in northern Ontario. He moved to the Niagara Falls area and created a 44' × 66' mural consisting of glazed bricks in Fonthill, Ontario, which required him to travel to Columbus in 1962 to acquire the glazed bricks. During the trip he stopped in the town of Berlin, Ohio, for lunch, and overheard someone speaking what sounded much like his mother tongue. He became interested in Amish culture and history.

Gaugel had been working on a large glazed-brick mural in Fonthill, Ontario, and when he had completed it he and his family moved to the Holmes County area in 1972, where they took up residence on an Amish-owned farm. He studied the history of the Amish and, according to AMCH executive director Marcus Yoder, was "particularly impacted" by their stance against joining the military because of his own history of having been drafted and his traumatic wartime experiences, which impacted his views of war. Gaugel said, "hunger, fear, pain, suffering ... all for a completely useless cause. War is useless. It accomplishes nothing. It doesn't solve problems; it causes more". He became a pacifist and felt an affinity with the nonresistant Anabaptists because of this.

Gaugel felt a second connection to the Anabaptists and their persecutions when he learned that some of the executions of early Anabaptists had taken place near the village where he had grown up; he could not recall having learned about them or the Anabaptist movement in Germany. In 1978, there was growing Amish tourism in the Holmes County area and a resulting frustration expressed by his Amish neighbors with the constant interruptions of their lives by tourists; an Amish blacksmith told him, "I wish there was some place in the area that people could go and find out about why we live the way we do." Gaugel decided to create the Behalt cyclorama to explain Anabaptist history to visitors.

== Works ==
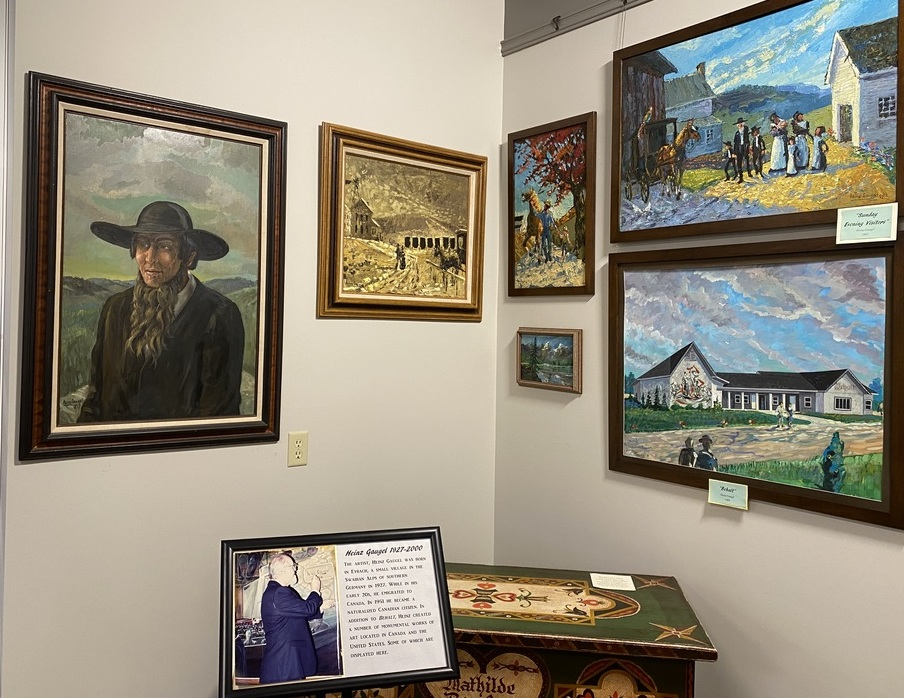
Works by Gaugel on display at the Amish and Mennonite Heritage Center

Gaugel's works include multiple very large installations. He painted "hundreds" of murals, according to The Budget.

=== In Canada ===
He created a 16' × 80' window of slablass at St. Mary's Church in Richmond Hill, Ontario, as well as a 14' tall statue of the Virgin Mary. He created a 17' × 72' mural depicting the history of the Welland Canal for a Sears department store in Welland, Ontario. He created a 5-story tall mural for the facade of the E. L. Crossley school.

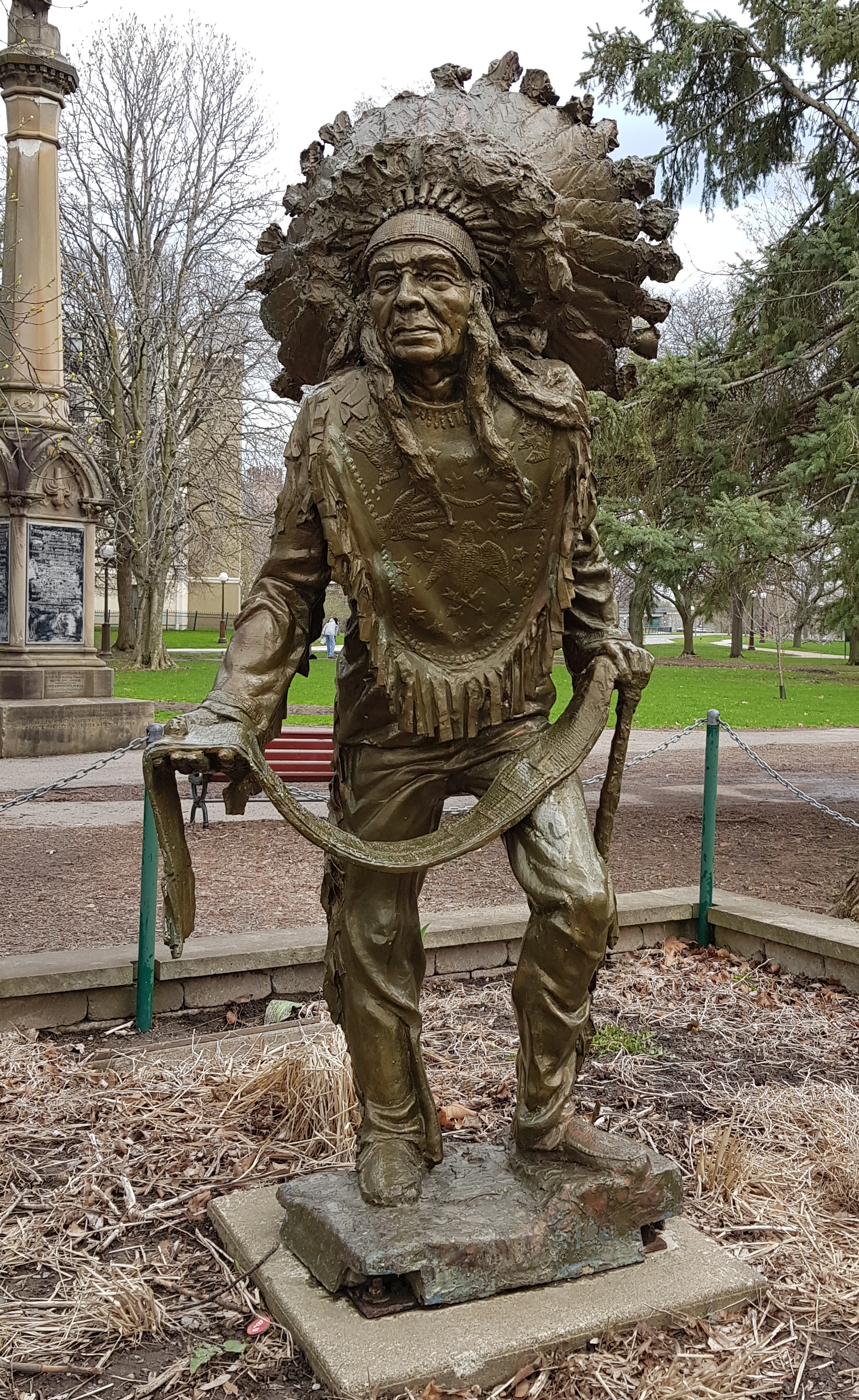
Statue of Clinton Rickard

=== In the United States ===
He created an 18' × 44' mosaic of Byzantine glass at St. Hyacinth Church in Dunkirk, New York. He created a 20' × 80' sgraffito at St. John Vianney Church in Orchard Park, New York. In 1975 he created a life-size statue of Clinton Rickard, a Tuscarora tribal leader who founded the Indian Defense League; as of 1990 the statue was in place at the New York State Park at Niagara Falls.

==== Behalt ====
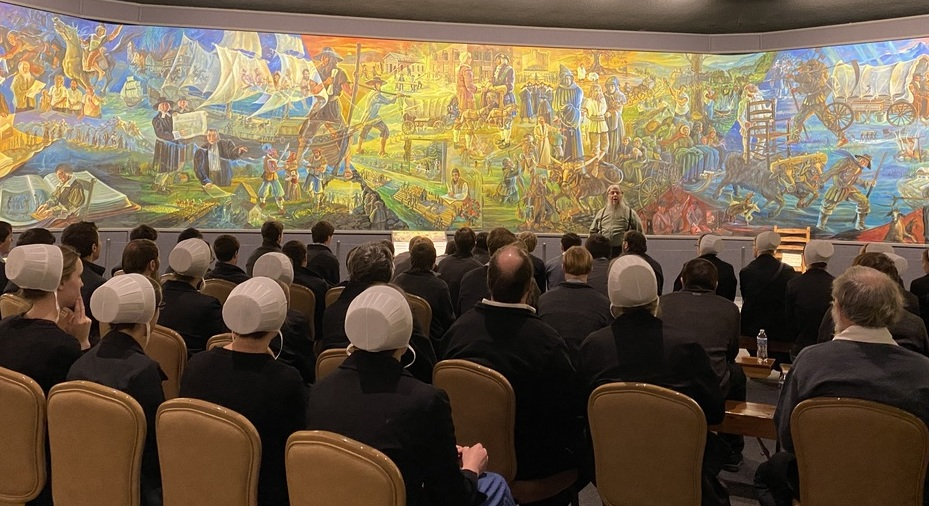
Amish youth groups visiting Behalt

Gaugel's largest installation and best-known work is the Behalt cyclorama, a 10' × 265' oil-on-canvas mural in the round, which he worked on for 14 years from 1978 through 1992. Before starting the mural he researched the history of the Anabaptist movement and travelled to Europe to find descendants of the movement's leaders to study their facial features. He began painting it in the Dunkard Brethren Church in Bunker Hill, Ohio, which at the time held the Mennonite Information Center, where he had set up a studio. That year he completed approximately 45 feet and had sketched out additional portions. The following year the project's primary financial backer died, and issues with her estate delayed the project multiple times over the next decade. In 1989 he resumed work and had the mural ready to hang in 1990, after which he spent another two years on details and touchups. Visitors to the center were able to watch while he did this work.

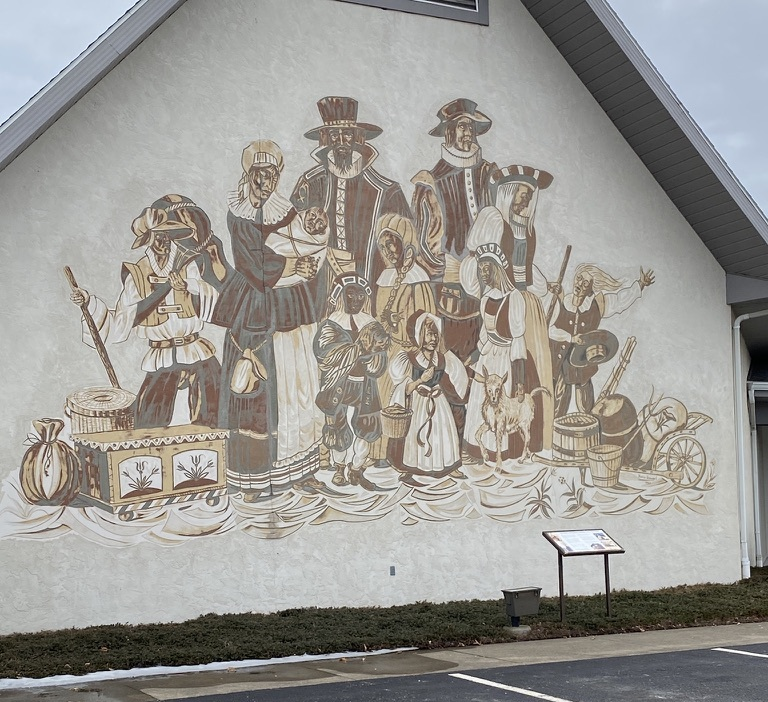
Gaugel's sgraffito

He had originally planned it to be 180' long, but realized there was too much content to cover and expanded it to 265'; even then he referred to the content as "being squeezed into" that length. After the Amish & Mennonite Heritage Center (AMHC) purchased the unfinished painting in 1988, he continued his work on it in their space, often while visitors watched. He completed the painting in 1992, but continued to work in his studio at the center until shortly before his death in 2000. He also completed a 22' × 34' sgraffito, Immigration, on the exterior of the building that houses the cyclorama. The sgraffito depicts 18th and 19th century Swiss immigrants. According to AMHC's executive director, Marcus Yoder, it is believed to be the largest sgraffito in the US.

The work has achieved prominence. According to Paul Locher writing in The Daily Record after Gaugel's death, Anabaptist leaders said "only Gaugel could have painted such a masterpiece because he was both willing to do the massive research ... and brought no biases to the project as someone from within the faith might have done." Behalt is one of only four extant cycloramas in the US, and is the only one in the world painted by a single artist.

Commissioned Work

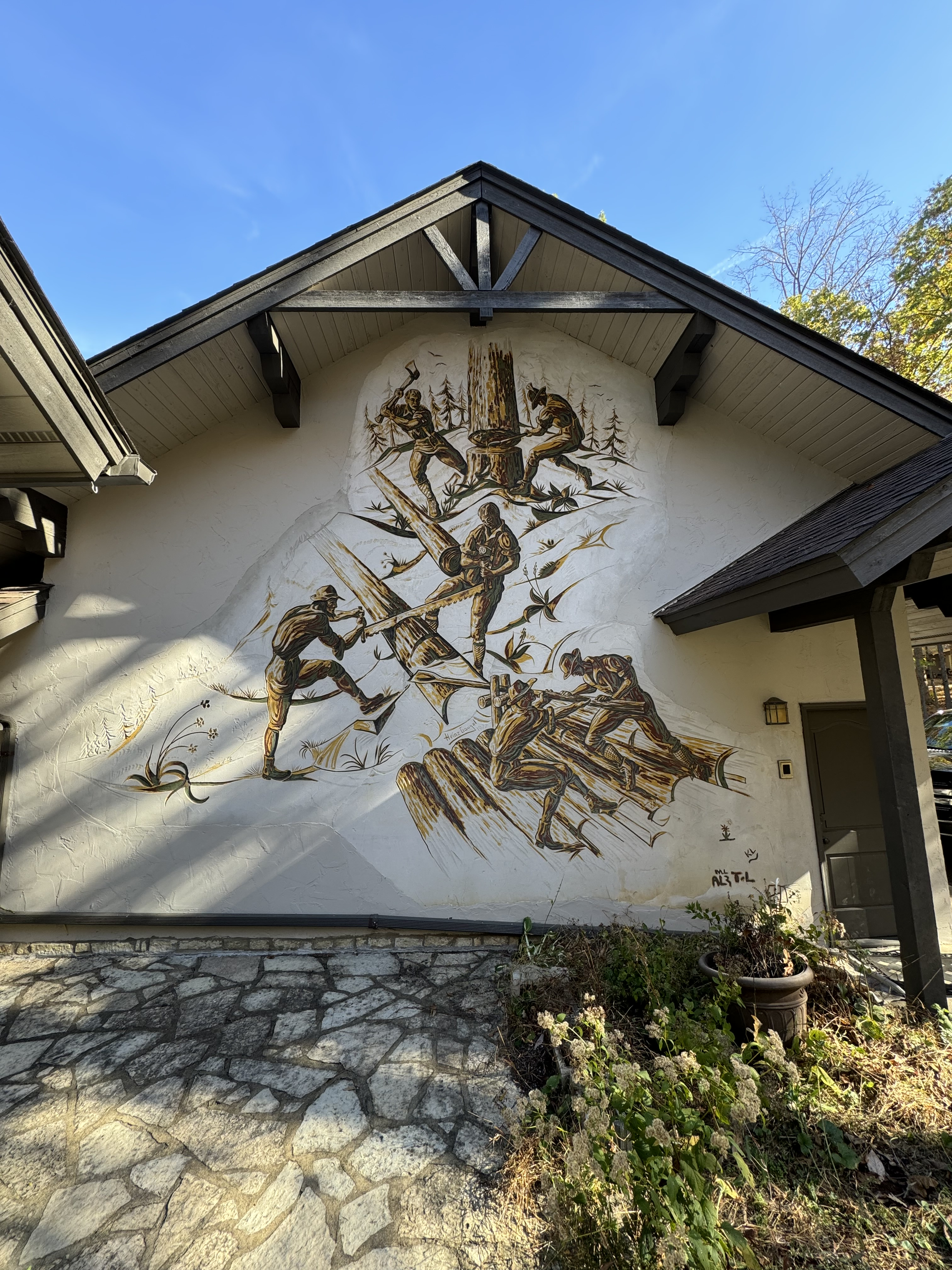
Heinz Gaugel Commissioned Work

In the 1970s, Heinz Gaugel created a sgraffito for a private residence in Pataskala, Ohio. The piece, which is installed on the exterior of the home, depicts scenes of early logging, portraying the strength and skill of the loggers as they work. The earthy tones and dynamic figures capture the intensity of labor in the natural environment. This artwork, crafted in Gaugel's signature style, integrates seamlessly with the architectural design, enhancing the rustic charm of the home while providing a unique glimpse into American labor history. The piece is one of several large-scale sgraffito works by Gaugel, who was known for his attention to historical detail and ability to depict human effort in monumental form.

== Techniques ==
Gaugel worked in fresco, Byzantine mosaic, glazed brick, sgraffito, polyurethane enamel, and oil on canvas. He also created statues and monuments.

== Teaching ==
Gaugel taught at the Centre for the Arts in Fonthill, Ontario, and also had a studio there.

== Personal life ==
In 1990 Gaugel and his wife, Mary Grace, lived in Kidron, Ohio. He moved back to Ontario in October of 2000. He had two stepsons. He experienced health issues which affected his ability to work.

Gaugel died December 28, 2000, at his home in Fonthill, Ontario at the age of 73. A memorial service was held for him in the mural hall at the Amish and Mennonite Heritage Center January 7, 2001.
