= Behalt =

Painting by Heinz Gaugel

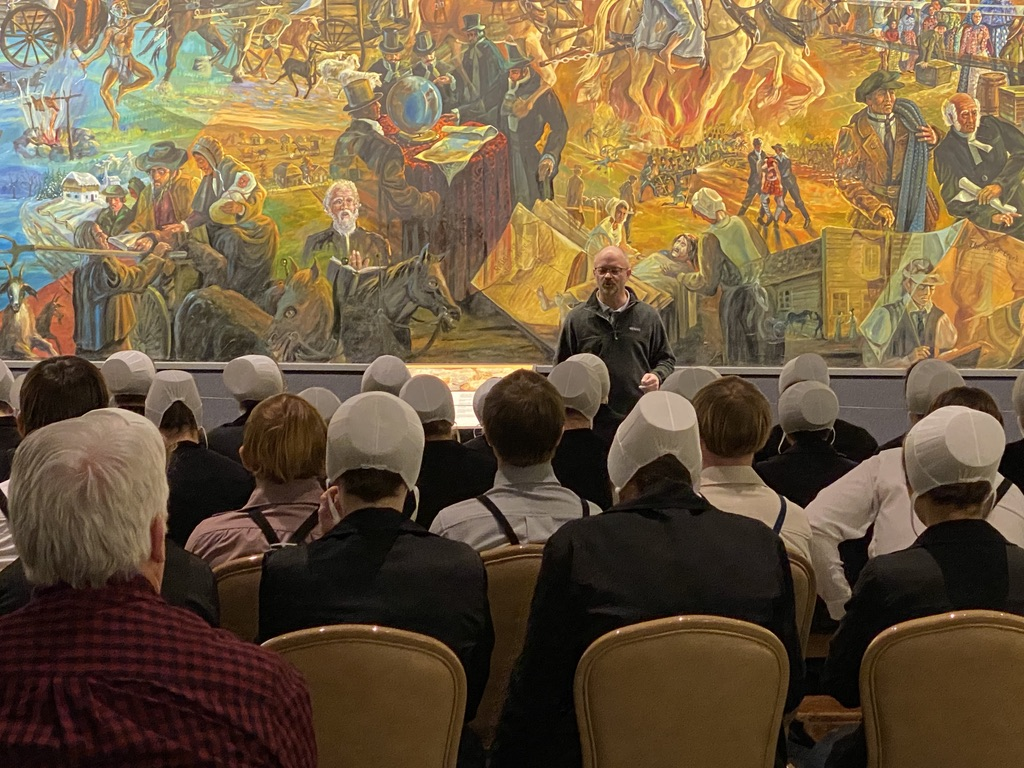
- Amish youth group visiting Behalt
- Artist: Heinz Gaugel
- Year: 1978
- Completion date: 1992
- Medium: Oil on canvas
- Dimensions: 3.0 m × 81 m (10 ft × 265 ft)
- Location: Amish and Mennonite Heritage Center, Berlin, Holmes County, Ohio; 40.568018°N 81.780475°W
- Website: behalt.com

Behalt is a 10-by-265-foot (3.0 by 80.8 m) cyclorama painted by Heinz Gaugel in the late 20th century. The name comes from the German word behalten: to hold onto or to remember. The work illustrates the heritage of the Amish and Mennonite people from the beginnings of Christianity and is displayed in the Amish and Mennonite Heritage Center in Berlin, Holmes County, Ohio. The Columbus Dispatch said it was the "Sistine Chapel of the Amish and Mennonites". One of four existing cycloramas in the US and one of only 16 in the world, Behalt is the only existing cyclorama painted by a single artist.

Anabaptist scholar Susan Biesecker-Mast calls it "an effort to exceed the tourist economy of Holmes County by offering a transformative rhetoric for its visitors." She relates the narrative of the mural's creation as a venture by area religious leaders to retain control of the telling of their own story.

== Creation ==
In 1978, tourism in heavily-Amish eastern Holmes County had become more and more disruptive to the daily lives of residents, and an Amish blacksmith remarked to Gaugel that he wished there were some place tourists go could to learn why the Plain sects lived the way they do. Gaugel decided to create the cyclorama as an educational instrument. He researched the history of the Anabaptist movement and recruited a team of historians to ensure historical accuracy. He viewed the mural as a piece of historical rather than religious artwork.

The painting was created over 14 years. Gaugel began working in 1978; by 1990 all scenes were complete and the mural installed in its space. Detail work and retouching took another two years and were finished in 1992. Until it was installed, Gaugel had not seen his achievement in its entirety.

== Funding and ownership ==
In June 1979 a local Mennonite, Helen F. Smucker, offered funding for a studio, materials, and a display facility for the finished work in exchange for a share in ownership of the painting. Gaugel's first studio was in Old Dunkard Church in Bunker Hill, Ohio. Smucker died later that year, and a group of investors bought out her share and decided to build a display facility on the Amish Farm, one of the earliest tourist-oriented businesses in the area. Area ministers were concerned that, after Smucker's death, having no Mennonites involved in the project might affect the final finished result. According to Biesecker-Mast, the idea that their story would be told by non-members of the community and displayed for profit was "more than some religious leaders in the community could stand." They formed a committee to develop a Mennonite Information Center; the main agenda item at their first meeting was concern about the painting being purchased by someone who wanted to use it in a business venture.

When Gaugel told the investors he would need five more years to complete the painting, they sued him for breach of contract, and in 1980, the unfinished painting was seized by the Holmes County Sheriff "for safekeeping." In early summer 1981 Gaugel's former studio was opened to the public as the Mennonite Information Center. The painting was returned to Gaugel later that year, but a lawsuit required he change its name and move it out of state. In 1984 the group of investors offered their share of the mural to the Center. In 1986 a lien against the painting caused the work to be seized again, this time in Pennsylvania. In 1988 the Mennonite Information Center finally signed a purchase agreement, but the board struggled to purchase land and build a facility. In 1989, a group of Mennonite business leaders succeeded in their offer to purchase the painting and build a display facility. In 1990 the facility opened with the mural on display while Gaugel continued his work on it.

== Description ==
The cyclorama follows the development of the early Christian church, the acceptance of the Christian church by the Roman Empire under Constantine, and the early evolution of the Roman Catholic Church. It then moves to the Reformation and narrows its focus to 400-year history of the Radical Reformation and the Anabaptists. The remainder of the painting demonstrates how the Amish, Mennonite, and Hutterite movements grew, moved and developed from the Anabaptist beginning in 1525 in Zurich, Switzerland, their persecutions and their emigrations.

It ends with the disappearance of Mennonite missionaries during the Vietnam War. The mural portrays over 1200 people, representing Amish, Mennonite, Hutterites, and other Anabaptist groups. In 2019 an estimated 18,000 to 20,000 people from many countries viewed it.

The mural has a storyline progression; Gaugel intended that each scene would be "...the light source for the next" so that light radiates from one scene to another emphasizing the relationship between and among them.

The installation is octagonal, but the painting curves so that there are no visible corners; the scenes are placed so as to provide the illusion of a round space.

In 2019 the center began a new lighting project that was expected to require several years to design and complete. COVID-19 pandemic shutdowns of 2020 allowed workers more intensive access to the jobsite and the installation was completed in April 2021.

== Critical commentary and reaction ==
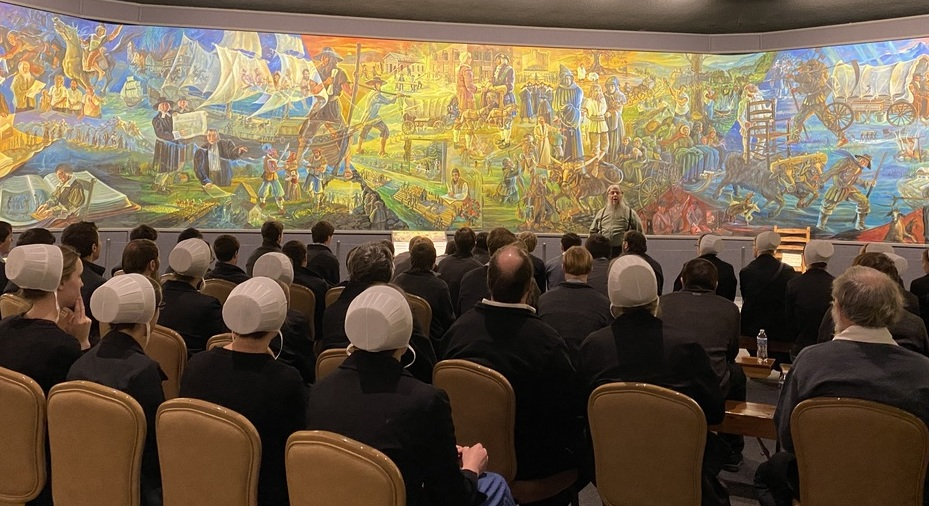
Scenes overlap with one another to give the feeling of a storyline of interwoven threads

Biesecker-Mast analyzes the mural as "a Christian rhetoric that, as a remembering and a giving, transcends the economy of exchange and possession that surrounds it." She notes that the primary theme of the mural that its story is not one but many interwoven threads, "complicated and messy" and that it was unlikely viewers would come away "with a sense of a neat chronology."

According to Biesecker-Mast, Behalt is not simply a painting but three separate media: a painting, a space and a story. She adds a fourth rhetorical concept: the mural's own creation history as a struggle of a people to retain their ability to control their own narrative. Because it is not possible to view the painting from a single point, one is forced to move through the space and experience it both as "a temporary (in the sense that once cannot stay here for long) and a temporal (in the sense that this is history) boundary between the viewer and the rolling hills and crowded highways of Holmes County." Because it is impossible to capture Behalf's size in one gaze, this is, she says, the entire story—it is too many stories and therefore impossible to fully grasp. This in turn she likens to the attempts at easy commodification of the Amish by local entrepreneurs: "Just as one cannot hold the painting in one's hands or one's gaze, the mural suggests that this history and these people are not, in fact, reducible to a singular narrative."

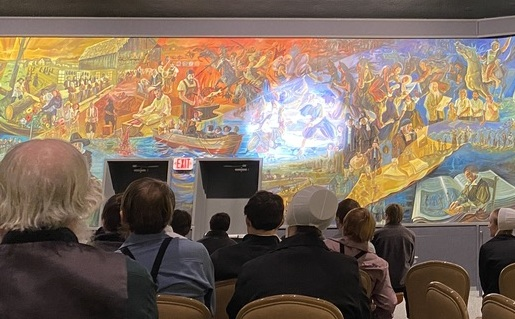
Gaugel used red to emphasize the "bloodiest" parts of the history

Sue Gorisek, writing in Ohio magazine, said, "As a work of art, it's impressive....As history, it's downright chilling," with depictions of beheadings, drownings, and burnings. Gaugel informed her, "I tell people, it's good that it makes them feel uncomfortable. This should not be too easy to look at." Gorisek notes that "Gaugel has chosen to depict the bloodiest era—the mid-16th century—in a turbulence of interwoven scenes bound together with subtle waves of a reddish hue, which can be seen as fire, or blood." The color red is used throughout to highlight incidents of persecution.

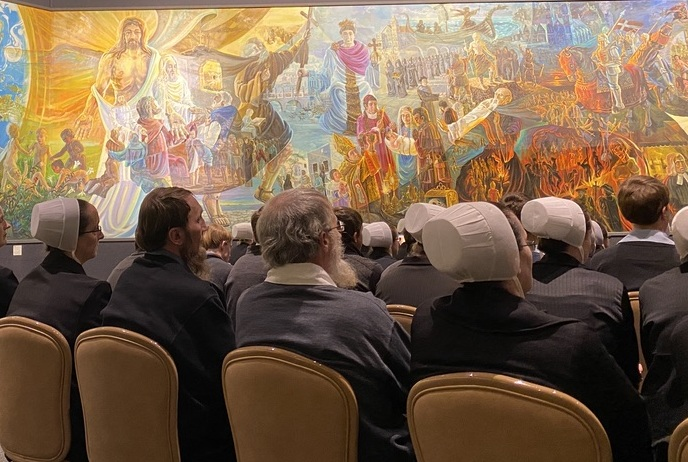
Jesus is the largest figure portrayed

Gaugel also used size to convey relative importance. Jesus is the largest of the historical figures portrayed.

According to Paul Locher, writing in The Daily Record after Gaugel's death, Anabaptist leaders said "only Gaugel could have painted such a masterpiece because he was both willing to do the massive research...and brought no biases to the project as someone from within the faith might have done." When the painting was first put on display, some Amish community members had reservations, seeing it as self-promotional and therefore unseemly, and local farmers would not allow signage on their land. Others thought it might be helpful as a place to send tourists who "pester(ed) [them] with questions."

== Notable people portrayed ==
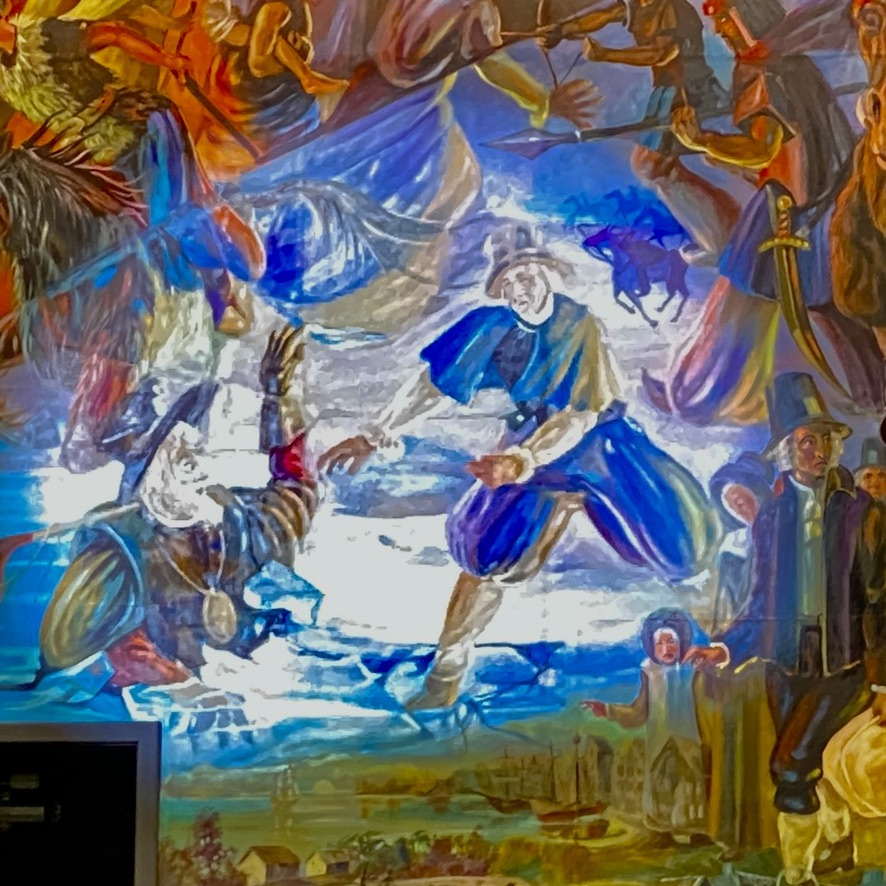
Dirk Willems rescuing his pursuer in what Biesecker-Mast calls "one of the most familiar stories" in Anabaptist history

- George Blaurock
- Peter J. Dyck
- Conrad Grebel
- Jacob Hochstetler
- Balthasar Hubmaier
- Jesus
- Martin Luther
- Felix Manz
- Saint Patrick
- Saint Paul
- Michael Sattler
- Menno Simons
- Jonas Stutzman
- Ulrich Ulman
- Thielman J. van Braght
- Dirk Willems
- Ulrich Zwingli

== Historical events portrayed ==
- Bubonic Plague
- Conscientious objection in World War II
- Crusades
- Emigration by Anabaptists
- Reformation

== Other depictions ==
- The founding of The Budget
- The foundings of Goshen College, Bluffton University, and Eastern Mennonite University

== Artist ==
Heinz Gaugel was born in the Black Forest Region of Germany, where he grew up speaking Swabish, a dialect similar to Pennsylvania Dutch. He moved to Canada in 1951. He was living in Ontario when he travelled to Columbus, Ohio in 1962, stopped in the town of Berlin for lunch, and overheard someone speaking what sounded much like his mother tongue. He became interested in Amish culture and history.

He and his family moved to the Holmes County area in 1972 and in 1978, as a response to growing Amish tourism in the area, he decided to create the cyclorama to explain Anabaptist history to visitors. After the Amish and Mennonite Heritage Center purchased the unfinished painting in 1988, he continued his work on it in their space, often while visitors watched. He completed the painting in 1992, but continued to work in his studio at the center until shortly before his death in 2000.
