= Amish and Mennonite Heritage Center =

Ohio museum

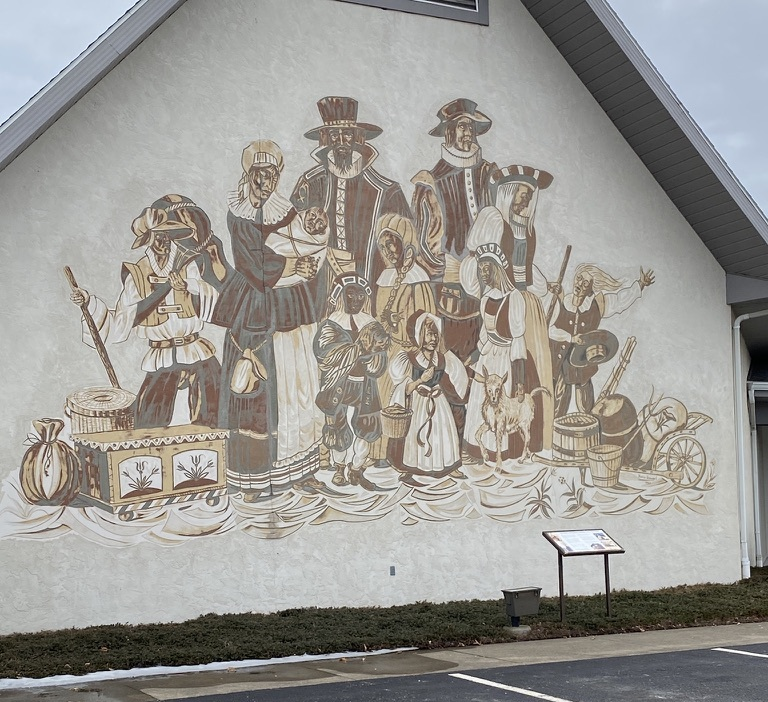
- Sgraffito on building exterior
- Established: 1981
- Location: Berlin, Holmes County, Ohio
- Coordinates: 40.567181°N 81.780930°W
- Type: Cultural museum
- Key holdings: Behalt
- Website: behalt.com

The Amish and Mennonite Heritage Center is located at 5798 County Road 77 near Bunker Hill in Berlin, Holmes County, Ohio, the world's highest-density area of Amish and a large population of other Anabaptists. It houses the Behalt cyclorama, one of a handful of remaining cycloramas worldwide and the only one painted by a single artist. The cyclorama presents the history of Anabaptism.

The center also houses the Ohio Amish Library and the Zollikon Institute.

== History ==
In 1981, the center was opened as the Mennonite Information Center in Bunker Hill's Dunkard Brethren Church building. It operated there for three years before relocating to a second location in Berlin.

In 1988 planning began for building a new center. By March 1989 construction had started on the current structure, designed to include the Behalt Cyclorama as well as a bookstore. The new complex opened in April 1990, funded by donations of $835,000. By 1990 the then unfinished Behalt cyclorama had been installed; it was completed in 1992 and dedicated that October. Behalt's artist, Heinz Gaugel, also created a 34 ft x 22 ft sgraffito, depicting the immigration of Anabaptists to the United States, on the building's exterior in 1993.

In 2002 the venue was renamed The Amish and Mennonite Heritage Center to reflect its mission as a cultural hub. That same year, the Pioneer Barn exhibit was built to house a restored Conestoga wagon, buggies, and farm equipment. In 2004 the South Bunker Hill schoolhouse, originally built in 1856 or 1857, was moved to the center's grounds and restored.

== Exhibits ==
The center presents the heritage of Ohio's Amish Country with the goal of accurately informing guests about the faith, culture, and traditional ways of the Amish, Mennonite, and Hutterite people (and their descendants) through a variety of exhibits.

=== Behalt ===
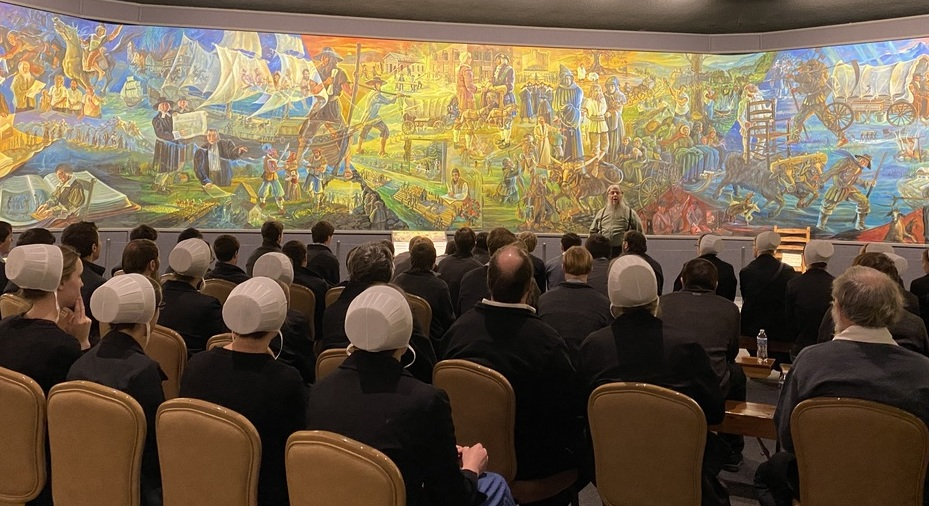
Amish youth groups listening to a tour guide at Behalt

The center houses Behalt, a 10 ft x 265 ft cyclorama, also known as a mural-in-the-round, illustrating the heritage of the Amish and Mennonite people from their origin in Switzerland (circa 1525) to the present day. Behalt was painted by artist Heinz Gaugel, a German born immigrant who came to Holmes County in 1962. Inspiration for the painting came in 1978 when an Amish blacksmith told Heinz, "I wish there was some place in the area that people could go and find out why we live the way we do."

The cyclorama is one of four existing in the US and one of only sixteen in the world; Behalt is the only existing cyclorama painted by a single artist.

=== Pioneer barn ===
In 2002, the Pioneer Barn exhibit was created to house a restored Conestoga wagon used by Anabaptist pioneers to travel into the area in the early 1800s. The exhibit also displays buggies and farm equipment in rotating exhibits.

=== South Bunker Hill schoolhouse ===
In 2004 the South Bunker Hill schoolhouse, originally built in 1856 or 1857, was moved to the center's grounds and restored.

== Other center elements ==
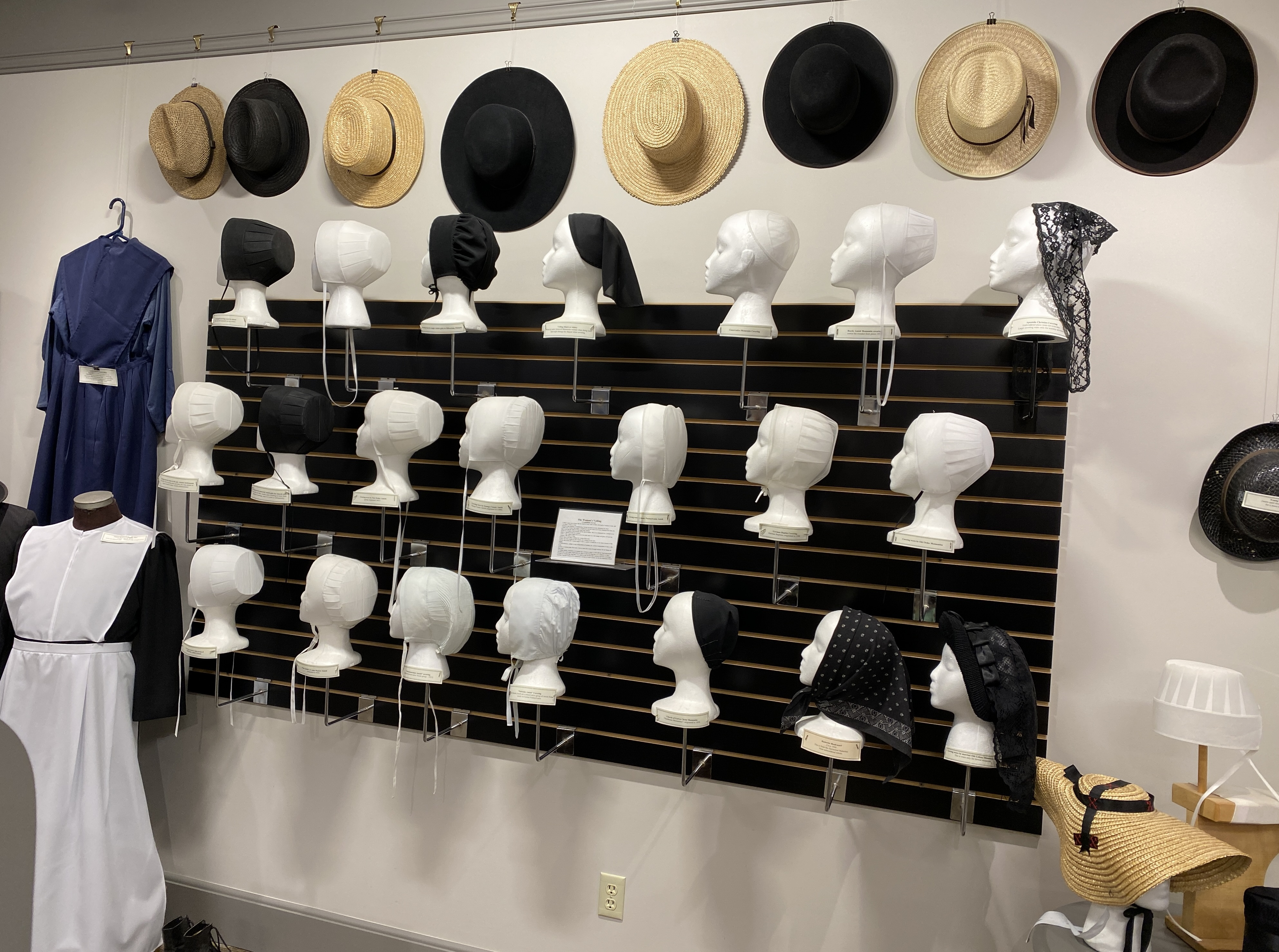
Display of headcoverings used by adherents of various Anabaptist Christian denominations

=== Displays ===
The center incorporates a display area for exhibits of various Anabaptist Christian denominations' head coverings; historical information about the international Amish and Mennonite newspaper The Budget; treatments of the Ausbund, a 1564 hymnal which is the oldest in continuous use; Martyrs Mirror and the Froschauer Bible; along with other displays. It includes a bookstore and gift shop.

=== Ohio Amish Library ===
The center also houses the Ohio Amish Library, available to researchers by appointment.

=== The Zollikon Institute ===
In 2021, the Zollikon Institute of Holmes County took up residence in the center, offering contemporary skills content in an Anabaptist context. The Institute partners with Canton, Ohio's Malone University to offer accredited courses.

== See also ==
- Amish in Ohio
- List of Amish and their descendants
- Amish Mennonite
- Amish Way of Life
