= East Holmes Local Schools =

School district in Holmes County, Ohio

East Holmes Local Schools is a school district in Holmes County, Ohio.

It was established in 1958.

== Schools ==
Secondary schools:

- Hiland High School
- Hiland Middle School

Elementary schools:

- Berlin Elementary School
- Charm Elementary School
- Chestnut Ridge Elementary School
- Flatridge Elementary School
- Mt. Hope Elementary School
- Walnut Creek Elementary School
- Winesburg Elementary School
- Wise Elementary School
