= New Order Tobe Amish =

American Christian denomination (1967-)

The New Order Tobe Amish, or often only New Order Tobe, are a small subgroup of Amish that belongs to the New Order Amish. In 1967, they split from the Tobe Amish, who in 1940 had split from the Troyer Amish, a very conservative group. They live in Ohio. They share an unusual mix of conservative and progressive traits. In contrast to other New Order Amish groups, they have a relative high retention rate of their young people that is comparable to the retention rate of Old Order Amish.

== History ==
The New Order Tobe have their roots in the most conservative Amish subgroup, the Swartzentruber Amish, who split from the Old Order mainstream in 1917. In 1931/32 the somewhat less conservative Troyer Amish split from the Swartzentrubers and in 1940 the Tobe Church split from the Troyers. In 1967, the New Order Tobe split from the Tobe Church. In only 50 years there were four splits, the first from the mainstream forming an extremely conservative group and then three splits in a more liberal direction.

== Belief and practice ==
In general, New Order Amish churches not only use modern conveniences like electricity and tractors for field work, they also have a different spirituality compared to the Old Orders. New Orders have Sunday Schools and more Bible study, and therefore a more evangelical view of Christianity.

However, the New Order Tobe use more technology than the Old Orders, but their spirituality is no different. For example, the New Order Tobe have electricity and telephones in the home and tractors for field work. They do not hold Sunday school during the “off” Sunday and they are quite conservative in dress. They have only blue curtains in their windows and do allow tobacco. They do not practice "Bann und Meidung" (excommunication and shunning).

== Population and congregations ==
The New Order Tobe are a relatively small subgroup of the Amish. In 2008, they had four church districts near Danville, Ohio, which is in the greater Holmes County Amish settlement, and in 2011, they had 5 church districts. According to Kraybill et al., the defection rate of their young people is only 19.6 percent which is very low for New Orders.
