= Berlin, Holmes County, Ohio =

Berlin, Ohio
- Census-designated place
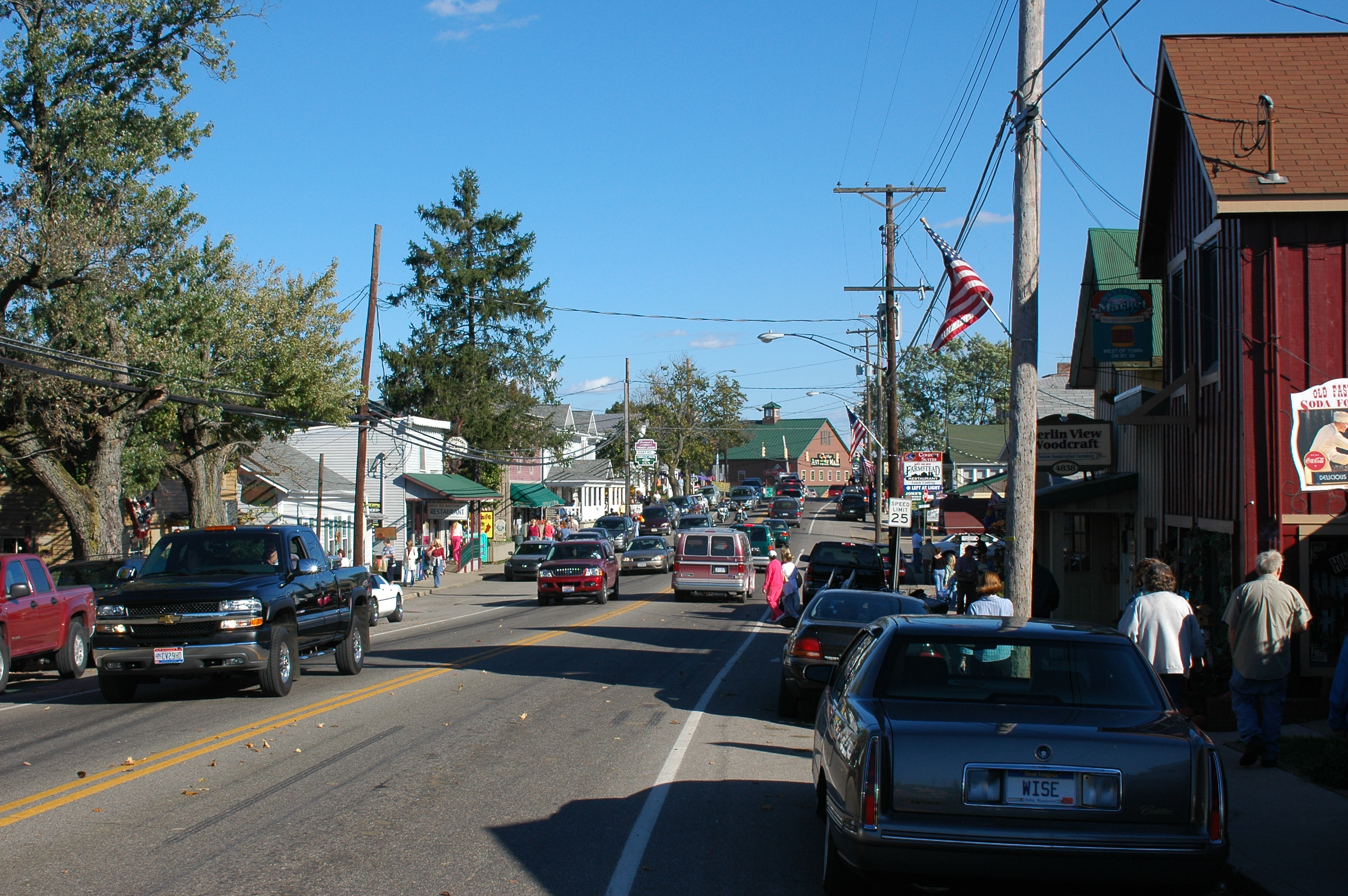
- Downtown Berlin

- Location within Ohio Location within the United States
- Coordinates: 40°33′16″N 81°47′59″W
- Country: United States
- State: Ohio
- County: Holmes
- Township: Berlin

Area
  - Total: 3.83 sq mi (9.91 km^{2})
  - Land: 3.82 sq mi (9.89 km^{2})
  - Water: 0.0077 sq mi (0.02 km^{2})
- Elevation: 1,227 ft (374 m)

Population (2020)
  - Total: 1,447
  - Density: 378.9/sq mi (146.31/km^{2})
- Time zone: UTC-5 (Eastern (EST))
  - Summer (DST): UTC-4 (EDT)
- ZIP code: 44610
- Area code: 330
- FIPS code: 39-05816
- GNIS feature ID: 2628864

Berlin (/ˈbɜːrlɪn/ BUR-lin) is an unincorporated community and census-designated place in central Berlin Township, Holmes County, Ohio, United States. It had a population of 1,447 at the 2020 census. Located in Ohio's Amish Country, the village is part of a large regional tourism industry.

== History ==
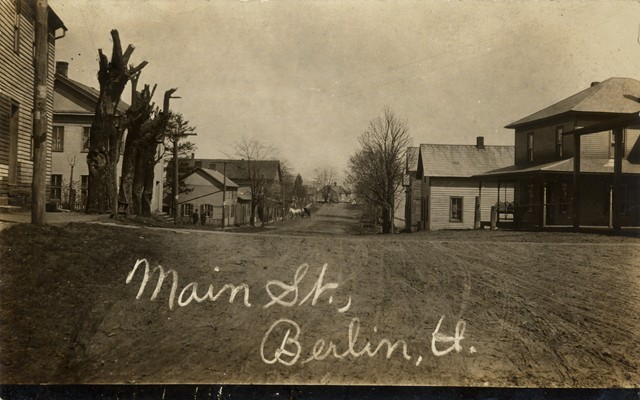
Berlin circa 1909

Historical population
Census	Pop.	Note	%±
2010	898		—
2020	1,447		61.1%
2010 and 2020

The village of Berlin–the oldest existing village in Holmes County–was first planned on July 2, 1816, by John Swigert, a native of Berlin, Germany. Swigert's plan provided for 108 lots to be arrayed along two streets, one north–south and the other east–west. Another early settler, Joseph Troyer, hailed from Berlin, Pennsylvania, and together Swigert and Troyer bestowed upon the new settlement the shared name of their respective home towns. Berlin is located at a high point in Holmes County, and local legend holds that Swigert chose the site because, thus situated, the town could be more readily defended against Indian attack.

A large share of the early settlers of the Berlin area were of German or Swiss ancestry and came to Ohio from Pennsylvania.

In 1818, a school was established in Berlin and in 1822 a post office. These were soon followed by Methodist, Presbyterian, Baptist and Mennonite churches. Later, Amish settlers began to arrive. Berlin enjoyed commercial and industrial growth, and during the 19th century was home to machine shops, a foundry, blacksmith shops, a hat factory, hotels, an auction house, and a variety of retail establishments. Berlin was described in 1833 as having 21 residential houses, two stores, two taverns and a physician.

Today, Berlin is in the center of Ohio's largest Amish community and is home to the Amish and Mennonite Heritage Center, featuring the Amish and Anabaptist history cyclorama, Behalt. Ohio has about 56,000 Amish residents, an increase of 60 percent since 1992.

== Geography ==
Berlin is situated in east-central Holmes County at the junction of U.S. Route 62 and State Route 39. US-62 leads northeast 11 miles (18 km) to Wilmot, and State Route 39 leads southeast 10 miles (16 km) to Sugarcreek. Together, the two highways lead west 7 miles (11 km) to Millersburg, the Holmes county seat.

Berlin is located at latitude 40° 33' 40" north and longitude 81° 47' 40" west. The ZIP code is 44610 and the FIPS place code is 05816. The elevation ranges from 1,200 to 1,280 feet (370 to 390 m) above sea level.

== Economy ==
More tourists visit Berlin, permanent population 685, than any other town in Ohio Amish Country. Berlin was the first town in Ohio to market the Amish to tourists. Berlin's business district is large, with as of 2012 more than 40 shops, 10 hotels, and 40 restaurants large and small. Amish county analyst Susan L. Trollinger calls its architecture and offerings "eclectic" but dominated by the American frontier and the 1950s and points out that like Walnut Creek, all call back to the past. Trollinger argues that the frontier theme in Berlin presents a story of peaceful people leaving crowded cities behind in order to make a better life for themselves and their families. The community is home to the Amish and Mennonite Heritage Center.

== Notable people ==
- Atlee Pomerene, U.S. senator
- Nate Torrence, television actor
- Alta Weiss, early semiprofessional female baseball player

== See also ==
- Berlin, Williams County, Ohio
