= Killbuck =

Killbuck may refer to:

- Bemino (fl. 1710s–1780s), known as John Killbuck Sr, medicine man and war leader of Delaware (Lenape) and Shawnee warriors
- Gelelemend (1737–1811), known as John Killbuck Jr, Bemino's son, Delaware (Lenape) chief
- Killbuck Township, Holmes County, Ohio, U.S.
  - Killbuck, Ohio
  - Killbuck Creek
- Killbuck Creek (Kishwaukee River tributary), Illinois, U.S.

== See also ==
- Kilbuck (disambiguation)
- Lenape, an indigenous people of the Northeastern Woodlands
