= 1948 United States presidential election in Ohio =

- November 2, 1948

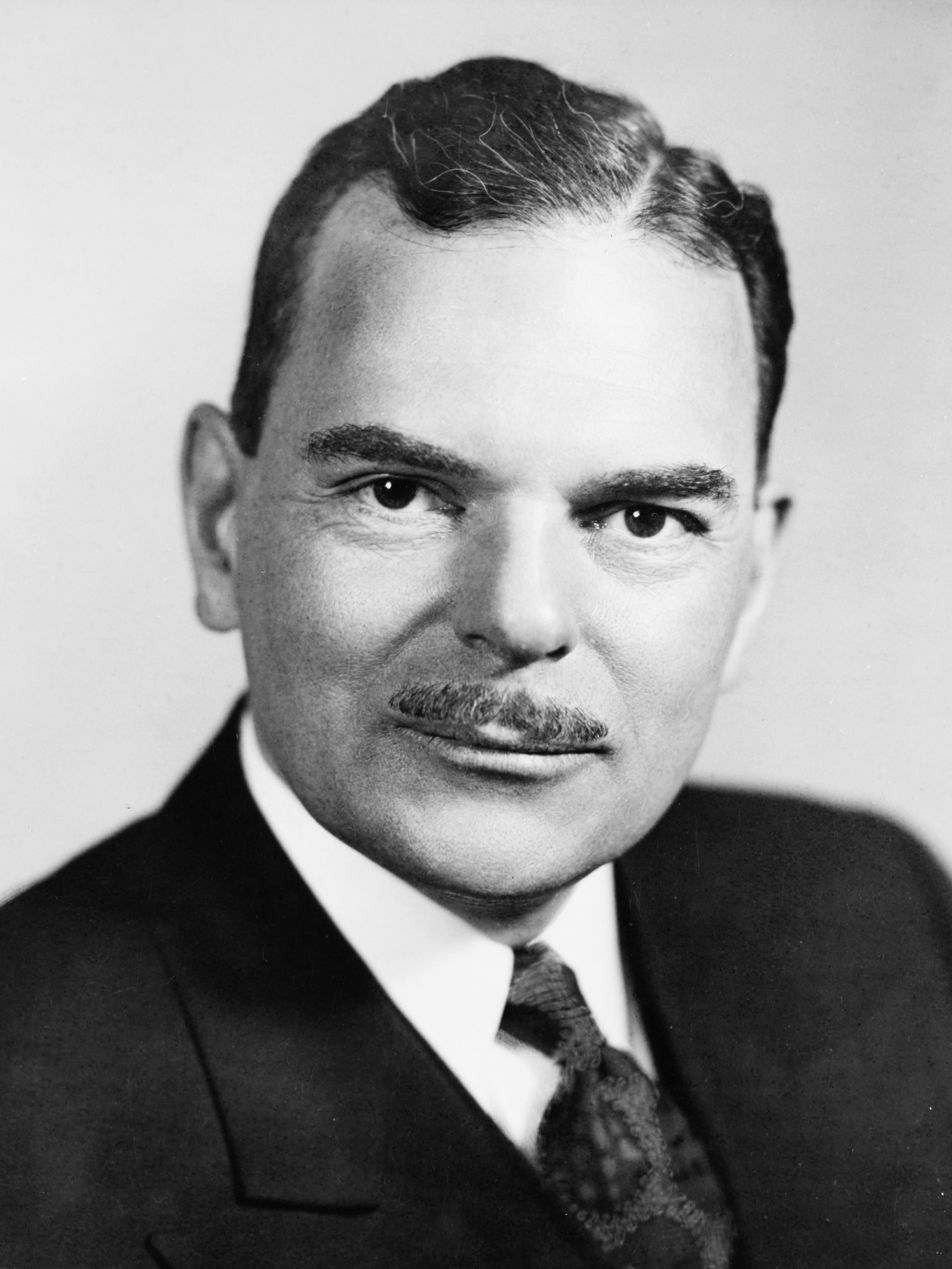
Nominee	Harry S. Truman	Thomas E. Dewey
Party	Democratic	Republican
Home state	Missouri	New York
Running mate	Alben W. Barkley	Earl Warren
Electoral vote	25	0
Popular vote	1,452,791	1,445,684
Percentage	49.48%	49.24%
County results
Truman
50–60%
60–70%
Dewey
40–50%
50–60%
60–70%
70–80%
President before election
Harry S. Truman
Democratic
Elected President
Harry S. Truman
Democratic

The 1948 United States presidential election in Ohio was held on November 2, 1948, as part of the 1948 United States presidential election. State voters chose 25 electors to the Electoral College, who voted for president and vice president.

Ohio was narrowly won by Democratic Party candidate, incumbent President Harry S. Truman with 49.48% of the popular vote. Republican Party candidate Thomas E. Dewey received 49.24% of the popular vote. The state had previously gone to Dewey against Franklin D. Roosevelt four years earlier. Furthermore, Truman won Ohio with a smaller share of the vote than Roosevelt had lost it with four years prior, made possible by Dewey's weaker performance than in 1944 in the state. To date, this is the last time a Democrat won Ohio but lost neighboring Pennsylvania; it is also the last time Ohio voted more Democratic than Pennsylvania. This was the closest margin of any state in the election.

On June 4, 1948, Secretary of State Edward J. Hummel attempted to block the Progressives from appearing on the ballot citing a 1941 law prohibiting "parties or groups engaged in un-American activities". He claimed that three of Wallace's campaigners in the state were communists. The Progressives sued and the Supreme Court of Ohio ruled in their favor. The Progressives chose to petition to place Wallace onto the ballot as an independent as the option for creating a party required 500,000 signatures. Hummel rejected their petition claiming that independents could not appear on the presidential ballot, but the Supreme Court of Ohio ruled in favor of the Progressives. Voters would have to vote for all 25 Wallace electors individually rather than using the straight party option available for the major parties.

== Results ==
1948 United States presidential election in Ohio
Party	Candidate	Votes	Percentage	Electoral votes
Democratic	Harry S. Truman (incumbent)	1,452,791	49.48%	25
Republican	Thomas E. Dewey	1,445,684	49.24%	0
Progressive	Henry A. Wallace	37,596	1.28%	0
Totals		2,936,071	100.0%	25

=== Results by county ===
County	Harry S. Truman Democratic		Thomas E. Dewey Republican		Henry A. Wallace Progressive		Margin		Total votes cast
County	#	%	#	%	#	%	#	%	Total votes cast
Adams	4,293	45.63%	5,103	54.24%	12	0.13%	-810	-8.61%	9,408
Allen	13,161	42.91%	17,380	56.67%	127	0.41%	-4,219	-13.76%	30,668
Ashland	6,095	42.95%	8,027	56.56%	69	0.49%	-1,932	-13.61%	14,191
Ashtabula	12,560	44.34%	15,389	54.33%	377	1.33%	-2,829	-9.99%	28,326
Athens	7,398	45.24%	8,902	54.43%	54	0.33%	-1,504	-9.20%	16,354
Auglaize	5,670	45.28%	6,818	54.45%	34	0.27%	-1,148	-9.17%	12,522
Belmont	23,217	62.51%	13,283	35.76%	643	1.73%	9,934	26.75%	37,143
Brown	5,140	56.49%	3,931	43.20%	28	0.31%	1,209	13.29%	9,099
Butler	24,276	52.78%	21,393	46.52%	322	0.70%	2,883	6.27%	45,991
Carroll	2,996	40.97%	4,283	58.57%	34	0.46%	-1,287	-17.60%	7,313
Champaign	4,585	41.31%	6,492	58.49%	23	0.21%	-1,907	-17.18%	11,100
Clark	17,236	47.99%	18,548	51.64%	133	0.37%	-1,312	-3.65%	35,917
Clermont	8,224	48.70%	8,592	50.88%	71	0.42%	-368	-2.18%	16,887
Clinton	3,758	38.35%	6,009	61.32%	32	0.33%	-2,251	-22.97%	9,799
Columbiana	16,588	48.03%	17,724	51.32%	226	0.65%	-1,136	-3.29%	34,538
Coshocton	6,457	47.36%	7,096	52.05%	81	0.59%	-639	-4.69%	13,634
Crawford	7,600	46.05%	8,862	53.70%	41	0.25%	-1,262	-7.65%	16,503
Cuyahoga	257,958	52.58%	214,889	43.80%	17,781	3.62%	43,069	8.78%	490,628
Darke	8,770	49.23%	8,956	50.28%	87	0.49%	-186	-1.04%	17,813
Defiance	4,454	42.79%	5,927	56.94%	28	0.27%	-1,473	-14.15%	10,409
Delaware	4,371	34.95%	8,089	64.68%	46	0.37%	-3,718	-29.73%	12,506
Erie	8,644	47.23%	9,568	52.28%	90	0.49%	-924	-5.05%	18,302
Fairfield	9,375	49.58%	9,471	50.09%	61	0.32%	-96	-0.51%	18,907
Fayette	3,513	41.85%	4,865	57.95%	17	0.20%	-1,352	-16.10%	8,395
Franklin	84,806	45.84%	98,707	53.36%	1,486	0.80%	-13,901	-7.51%	184,999
Fulton	2,672	28.95%	6,523	70.67%	35	0.38%	-3,851	-41.72%	9,230
Gallia	3,430	37.25%	5,743	62.38%	34	0.37%	-2,313	-25.12%	9,207
Geauga	2,960	34.33%	5,535	64.20%	127	1.47%	-2,575	-29.87%	8,622
Greene	8,970	49.02%	9,186	50.20%	144	0.79%	-216	-1.18%	18,300
Guernsey	6,639	46.17%	7,651	53.21%	90	0.63%	-1,012	-7.04%	14,380
Hamilton	135,290	46.91%	151,055	52.37%	2,068	0.72%	-15,765	-5.47%	288,413
Hancock	6,598	36.50%	11,427	63.21%	54	0.30%	-4,829	-26.71%	18,079
Hardin	5,474	42.21%	7,441	57.38%	52	0.40%	-1,967	-15.17%	12,967
Harrison	3,422	44.44%	4,215	54.74%	63	0.82%	-793	-10.30%	7,700
Henry	3,689	42.29%	5,024	57.59%	11	0.13%	-1,335	-15.30%	8,724
Highland	5,675	45.26%	6,849	54.62%	16	0.13%	-1,174	-9.36%	12,540
Hocking	4,462	54.34%	3,733	45.46%	17	0.21%	729	8.88%	8,212
Holmes	2,480	49.78%	2,496	50.10%	6	0.12%	-16	-0.32%	4,982
Huron	6,073	40.13%	9,004	59.50%	57	0.38%	-2,931	-19.37%	15,134
Jackson	5,059	46.52%	5,782	53.17%	33	0.30%	-723	-6.65%	10,874
Jefferson	23,725	61.77%	14,230	37.05%	454	1.18%	9,495	24.72%	38,409
Knox	6,120	41.48%	8,607	58.33%	28	0.19%	-2,487	-16.86%	14,755
Lake	10,844	44.98%	12,973	53.81%	291	1.21%	-2,129	-8.83%	24,108
Lawrence	9,495	53.69%	8,113	45.88%	76	0.43%	1,382	7.81%	17,684
Licking	12,511	45.07%	15,164	54.62%	87	0.31%	-2,653	-9.56%	27,762
Logan	5,149	38.70%	8,118	61.01%	38	0.29%	-2,969	-22.31%	13,305
Lorain	21,397	49.03%	21,616	49.53%	625	1.43%	-219	-0.50%	43,638
Lucas	74,064	51.85%	66,798	46.76%	1,991	1.39%	7,266	5.09%	142,853
Madison	3,356	41.46%	4,730	58.44%	8	0.10%	-1,374	-16.98%	8,094
Mahoning	62,468	61.76%	37,365	36.94%	1,313	1.30%	25,103	24.82%	101,146
Marion	8,223	44.20%	10,333	55.54%	50	0.27%	-2,110	-11.34%	18,606
Medina	5,133	34.88%	9,462	64.29%	122	0.83%	-4,329	-29.41%	14,717
Meigs	3,595	39.11%	5,564	60.52%	34	0.37%	-1,969	-21.42%	9,193
Mercer	5,928	52.92%	5,266	47.01%	8	0.07%	662	5.91%	11,202
Miami	10,066	43.29%	13,100	56.33%	89	0.38%	-3,034	-13.05%	23,255
Monroe	3,873	60.01%	2,574	39.88%	7	0.11%	1,299	20.13%	6,454
Montgomery	76,879	55.66%	60,048	43.48%	1,187	0.86%	16,831	12.19%	138,114
Morgan	1,783	33.79%	3,480	65.96%	13	0.25%	-1,697	-32.16%	5,276
Morrow	2,616	37.61%	4,327	62.21%	12	0.17%	-1,711	-24.60%	6,955
Muskingum	12,765	44.18%	16,049	55.54%	81	0.28%	-3,284	-11.37%	28,895
Noble	2,425	40.80%	3,494	58.79%	24	0.40%	-1,069	-17.99%	5,943
Ottawa	6,157	52.25%	5,591	47.45%	35	0.30%	566	4.80%	11,783
Paulding	2,512	41.11%	3,579	58.58%	19	0.31%	-1,067	-17.46%	6,110
Perry	5,264	47.89%	5,692	51.78%	36	0.33%	-428	-3.89%	10,992
Pickaway	5,290	51.55%	4,965	48.38%	7	0.07%	325	3.17%	10,262
Pike	4,516	63.06%	2,639	36.85%	6	0.08%	1,877	26.21%	7,161
Portage	11,987	50.21%	11,621	48.67%	268	1.12%	366	1.53%	23,876
Preble	4,656	44.28%	5,837	55.51%	23	0.22%	-1,181	-11.23%	10,516
Putnam	5,114	50.39%	5,006	49.33%	28	0.28%	108	1.06%	10,148
Richland	14,712	47.63%	15,894	51.46%	280	0.91%	-1,182	-3.83%	30,886
Ross	9,524	47.71%	10,398	52.08%	42	0.21%	-874	-4.38%	19,964
Sandusky	7,216	39.87%	10,847	59.93%	36	0.20%	-3,631	-20.06%	18,099
Scioto	17,923	51.43%	16,800	48.20%	129	0.37%	1,123	3.22%	34,852
Seneca	7,954	40.74%	11,493	58.87%	77	0.39%	-3,539	-18.13%	19,524
Shelby	6,939	56.06%	5,406	43.68%	32	0.26%	1,533	12.39%	12,377
Stark	47,533	47.46%	51,482	51.40%	1,135	1.13%	-3,949	-3.94%	100,150
Summit	78,096	55.41%	60,174	42.69%	2,680	1.90%	17,922	12.72%	140,950
Trumbull	37,097	58.52%	25,297	39.91%	998	1.57%	11,800	18.61%	63,392
Tuscarawas	14,799	55.19%	11,873	44.27%	145	0.54%	2,926	10.91%	26,817
Union	3,008	34.52%	5,688	65.28%	17	0.20%	-2,680	-30.76%	8,713
Van Wert	5,127	42.95%	6,785	56.84%	24	0.20%	-1,658	-13.89%	11,936
Vinton	2,016	46.29%	2,323	53.34%	16	0.37%	-307	-7.05%	4,355
Warren	5,793	43.20%	7,584	56.56%	32	0.24%	-1,791	-13.36%	13,409
Washington	7,542	42.05%	10,349	57.70%	45	0.25%	-2,807	-15.65%	17,936
Wayne	8,868	42.05%	12,152	57.62%	70	0.33%	-3,284	-15.57%	21,090
Williams	3,662	34.98%	6,784	64.79%	24	0.23%	-3,122	-29.82%	10,470
Wood	9,725	42.21%	13,197	57.28%	119	0.52%	-3,472	-15.07%	23,041
Wyandot	3,308	40.43%	4,849	59.26%	25	0.31%	-1,541	-18.83%	8,182
Totals	1,452,791	49.48%	1,445,684	49.24%	37,596	1.28%	7,107	0.24%	2,936,071

== See also ==
- United States presidential elections in Ohio

== Works cited ==
- Schmidt, Karl (1960). Henry A. Wallace: Quixotic Crusade 1948. Syracuse University Press. ISBN 978-0-8156-0020-6.
