= Monroe Township, Coshocton County, Ohio =

Township in Ohio, US

- Township
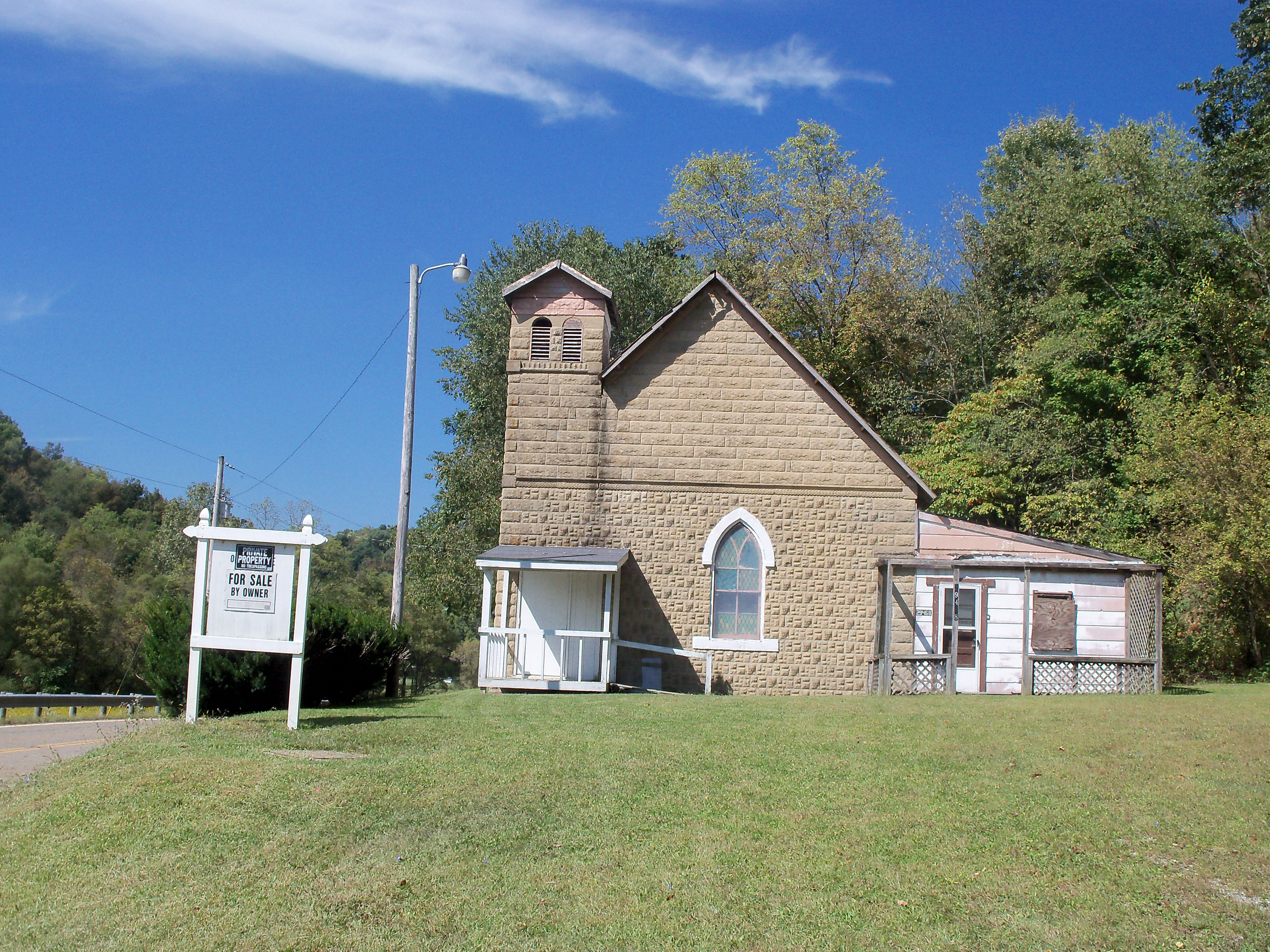
- The former Princeton Community Church

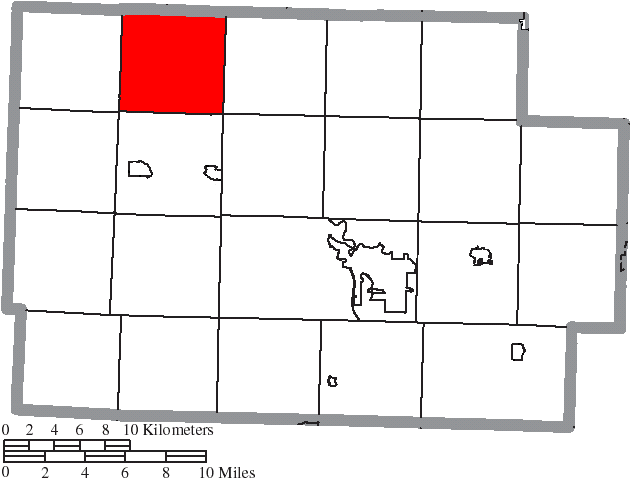
- Location of Monroe Township in Coshocton County
- Coordinates: 40°25′37″N 82°2′11″W
- Country: United States
- State: Ohio
- County: Coshocton

Area
  - Total: 26.1 sq mi (67.7 km^{2})
  - Land: 26.1 sq mi (67.7 km^{2})
  - Water: 0 sq mi (0.0 km^{2})
- Elevation: 1,243 ft (379 m)

Population (2020)
  - Total: 427
  - Density: 16.3/sq mi (6.31/km^{2})
- Time zone: UTC-5 (Eastern (EST))
  - Summer (DST): UTC-4 (EDT)
- FIPS code: 39-51352
- GNIS feature ID: 1085922

Monroe Township is one of the twenty-two townships of Coshocton County, Ohio, United States. As of the 2020 census the population was 427.

== Geography ==
Located in the northwestern part of the county, it borders the following townships:

- Killbuck Township, Holmes County - northeast
- Clark Township - east
- Bethlehem Township - southeast corner
- Jefferson Township - south
- Newcastle Township - southwest corner
- Tiverton Township - west
- Richland Township, Holmes County - northwest

No municipalities are located in Monroe Township, but it does contain the unincorporated communities of New Princeton and Spring Mountain.

== Name and history ==
It is one of twenty-two Monroe Townships statewide.

Monroe Township was settled chiefly by emigrants from Pennsylvania and Virginia. Monroe Township was organized in 1824.

== Government ==
The township is governed by a three-member board of trustees, who are elected in November of odd-numbered years to a four-year term beginning on the following January 1. Two are elected in the year after the presidential election and one is elected in the year before it. There is also an elected township fiscal officer, who serves a four-year term beginning on April 1 of the year after the election, which is held in November of the year before the presidential election. Vacancies in the fiscal officership or on the board of trustees are filled by the remaining trustees.
