= Hardy Township =

Hardy Township may refer to:

- Hardy Township, Holmes County, Ohio, United States
- Hardy Township, Ontario, Canada
