= New Princeton =

New Princeton may refer to:

- New Princeton, Ohio, an unincorporated community in Coshocton County
- New Princeton, Oregon, an unincorporated community in Harney County
