= Clark Township, Ohio =

Clark Township, Ohio, may refer to:

- Clark Township, Brown County, Ohio
- Clark Township, Clinton County, Ohio
- Clark Township, Coshocton County, Ohio
- Clark Township, Holmes County, Ohio
