= 1892 United States presidential election in Ohio =

- November 8, 1892
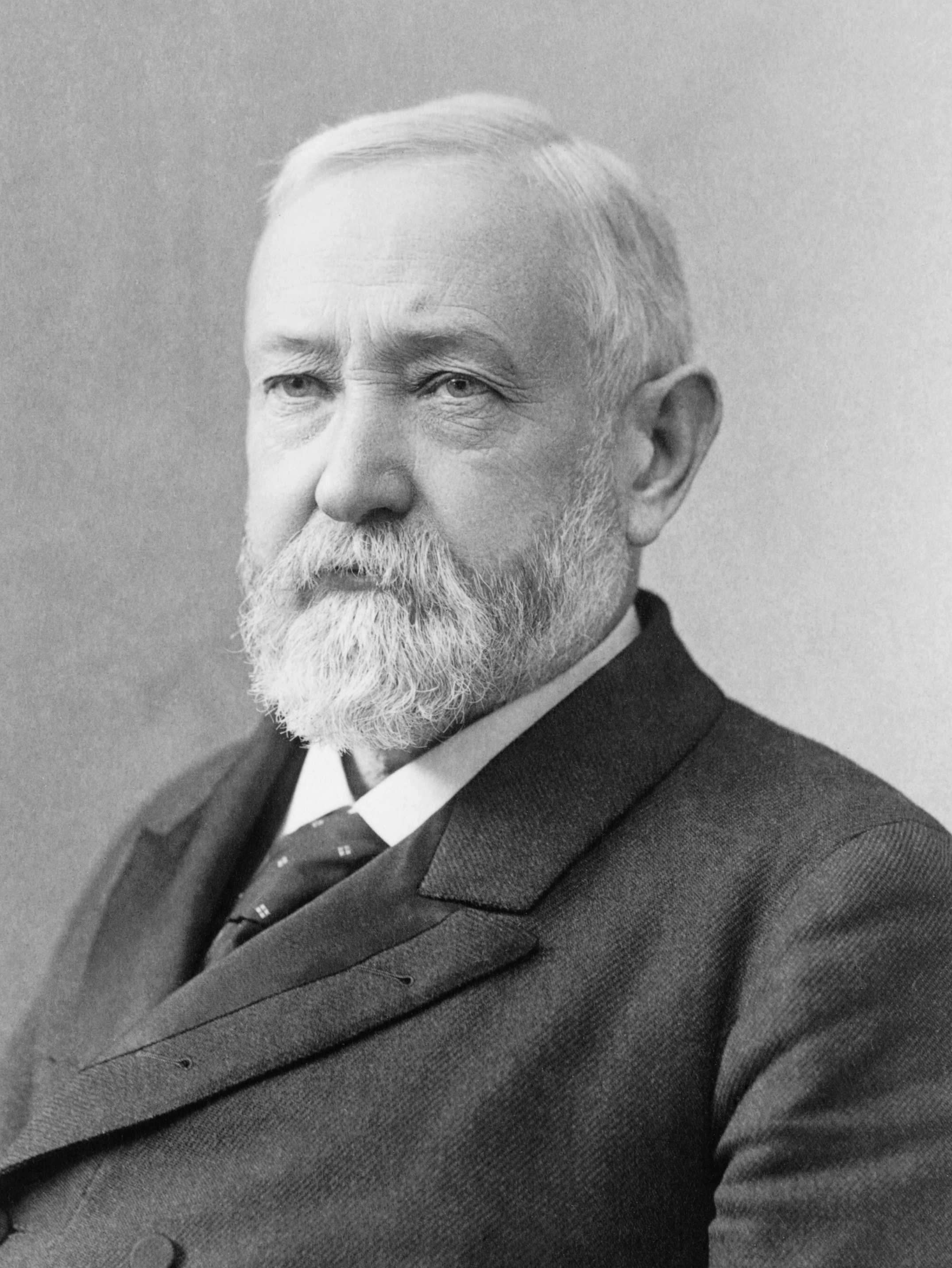

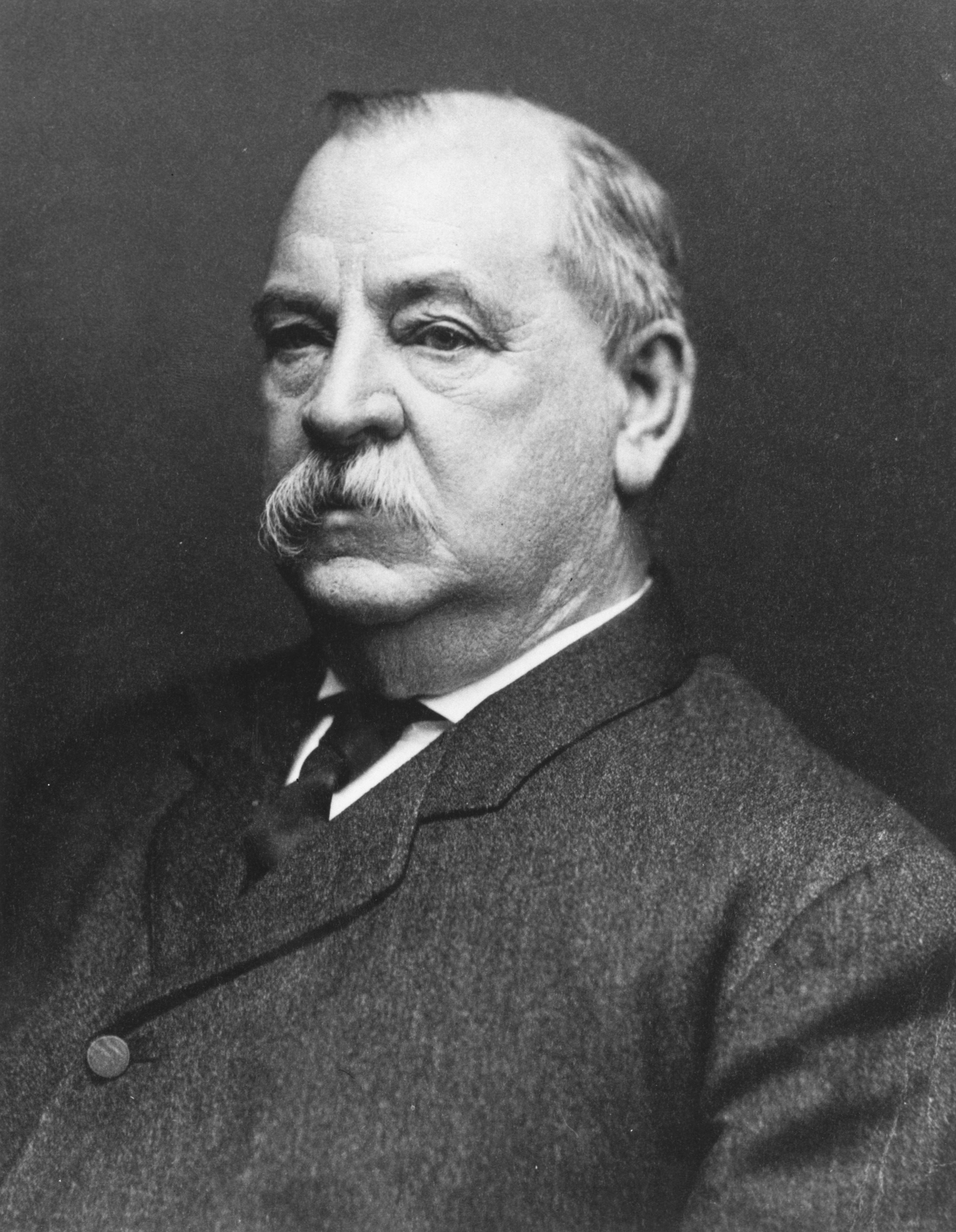
Nominee	Benjamin Harrison	Grover Cleveland
Party	Republican	Democratic
Home state	Indiana	New York
Running mate	Whitelaw Reid	Adlai Stevenson I
Electoral vote	22	1
Popular vote	405,187	404,115
Percentage	47.66%	47.53%
County results
Harrison
40–50%
50–60%
60–70%
Cleveland
40–50%
50–60%
60–70%
President before election
Benjamin Harrison
Republican
Elected President
Grover Cleveland
Democratic

The 1892 United States presidential election in Ohio was held on November 8, 1892. State voters chose 23 electors to the Electoral College, who voted for president and vice president.

Ohio was narrowly won by the Republican Party candidate, incumbent President Benjamin Harrison, with 47.66% of the popular vote. The Democratic Party candidate, former President Grover Cleveland, garnered 47.53% of the popular vote. Because the vote was so close and voters voted for individual electors, the twenty-third Harrison elector received fewer votes than one Cleveland elector, who was thus elected.

This was the last time until 2020 that an incumbent president won the state while losing re-election nationally, and the last election until 1944 that the state would vote for a losing candidate.

== Results ==
1892 United States presidential election in Ohio
Party	Candidate	Votes	Percentage	Electoral votes
Republican	Benjamin Harrison (incumbent)	405,187	47.66%	22
Democratic	Grover Cleveland	404,115	47.53%	1
Prohibition	John Bidwell	26,012	3.06%	0
Populist	James B. Weaver	14,850	1.75%	0
Totals		850,164	100.0%	23

=== Results by county ===
County	Benjamin Harrison Republican		Grover Cleveland Democratic		John Bidwell Prohibition		James B. Weaver People's		Margin		Total votes cast
County	#	%	#	%	#	%	#	%	#	%	Total votes cast
Adams	2,908	48.48%	2,832	47.22%	166	2.77%	92	1.53%	76	1.27%	5,998
Allen	3,579	38.55%	4,945	53.26%	392	4.22%	368	3.96%	-1,366	-14.71%	9,284
Ashland	2,256	40.63%	3,042	54.79%	211	3.80%	43	0.77%	-786	-14.16%	5,552
Ashtabula	6,419	63.57%	2,769	27.42%	671	6.64%	239	2.37%	3,650	36.15%	10,098
Athens	4,458	58.68%	2,599	34.21%	348	4.58%	192	2.53%	1,859	24.47%	7,597
Auglaize	2,113	33.68%	3,774	60.16%	127	2.02%	259	4.13%	-1,661	-26.48%	6,273
Belmont	6,329	48.28%	6,123	46.71%	542	4.13%	115	0.88%	206	1.57%	13,109
Brown	2,865	40.26%	3,975	55.85%	151	2.12%	126	1.77%	-1,110	-15.60%	7,117
Butler	4,636	36.16%	7,834	61.10%	244	1.90%	108	0.84%	-3,198	-24.94%	12,822
Carroll	2,261	53.97%	1,677	40.03%	147	3.51%	104	2.48%	584	13.94%	4,189
Champaign	3,708	53.97%	2,791	40.62%	295	4.29%	77	1.12%	917	13.35%	6,871
Clark	6,214	50.10%	5,255	42.37%	673	5.43%	260	2.10%	959	7.73%	12,402
Clermont	3,715	45.92%	4,069	50.29%	174	2.15%	133	1.64%	-354	-4.38%	8,091
Clinton	3,491	58.88%	2,076	35.01%	265	4.47%	97	1.64%	1,415	23.87%	5,929
Columbiana	7,232	51.97%	5,573	40.05%	751	5.40%	360	2.59%	1,659	11.92%	13,916
Coshocton	2,705	41.60%	3,529	54.27%	235	3.61%	34	0.52%	-824	-12.67%	6,503
Crawford	2,479	32.25%	4,858	63.21%	183	2.38%	166	2.16%	-2,379	-30.95%	7,686
Cuyahoga	26,657	45.63%	29,543	50.58%	1,197	2.05%	1,017	1.74%	-2,886	-4.94%	58,414
Darke	3,737	39.99%	4,916	52.61%	481	5.15%	210	2.25%	-1,179	-12.62%	9,344
Defiance	2,062	35.09%	3,311	56.35%	154	2.62%	349	5.94%	-1,249	-21.26%	5,876
Delaware	3,267	49.16%	2,710	40.78%	460	6.92%	208	3.13%	557	8.38%	6,645
Erie	3,979	47.28%	4,195	49.85%	117	1.39%	125	1.49%	-216	-2.57%	8,416
Fairfield	3,004	37.82%	4,650	58.55%	213	2.68%	75	0.94%	-1,646	-20.73%	7,942
Fayette	2,838	55.26%	1,989	38.73%	191	3.72%	118	2.30%	849	16.53%	5,136
Franklin	14,341	46.51%	15,495	50.25%	639	2.07%	360	1.17%	-1,154	-3.74%	30,835
Fulton	2,808	55.34%	1,919	37.82%	265	5.22%	82	1.62%	889	17.52%	5,074
Gallia	3,547	61.99%	1,984	34.67%	149	2.60%	42	0.73%	1,563	27.32%	5,722
Geauga	2,267	68.80%	758	23.00%	179	5.43%	91	2.76%	1,509	45.80%	3,295
Greene	4,210	59.07%	2,442	34.26%	380	5.33%	95	1.33%	1,768	24.81%	7,127
Guernsey	3,439	53.53%	2,510	39.07%	426	6.63%	50	0.78%	929	14.46%	6,425
Hamilton	41,963	51.15%	38,392	46.80%	584	0.71%	1,101	1.34%	3,571	4.35%	82,040
Hancock	4,780	46.44%	4,931	47.91%	427	4.15%	155	1.51%	-151	-1.47%	10,293
Hardin	3,515	47.71%	3,483	47.28%	244	3.31%	125	1.70%	32	0.43%	7,367
Harrison	2,541	51.60%	2,032	41.27%	323	6.56%	28	0.57%	509	10.34%	4,924
Henry	1,981	35.48%	3,312	59.32%	182	3.26%	108	1.93%	-1,331	-23.84%	5,583
Highland	3,496	49.14%	3,153	44.32%	285	4.01%	180	2.53%	343	4.82%	7,114
Hocking	2,034	41.65%	2,522	51.65%	188	3.85%	139	2.85%	-488	-9.99%	4,883
Holmes	1,152	25.56%	3,151	69.91%	185	4.10%	19	0.42%	-1,999	-44.35%	4,507
Huron	4,257	51.93%	3,592	43.82%	249	3.04%	100	1.22%	665	8.11%	8,198
Jackson	3,323	51.36%	2,622	40.53%	285	4.40%	240	3.71%	701	10.83%	6,470
Jefferson	4,793	53.28%	3,493	38.83%	557	6.19%	153	1.70%	1,300	14.45%	8,996
Knox	3,347	45.98%	3,489	47.93%	273	3.75%	171	2.35%	-142	-1.95%	7,280
Lake	2,846	67.46%	1,158	27.45%	137	3.25%	78	1.85%	1,688	40.01%	4,219
Lawrence	4,193	56.84%	2,988	40.50%	161	2.18%	35	0.47%	1,205	16.33%	7,377
Licking	4,619	41.97%	6,038	54.87%	193	1.75%	155	1.41%	-1,419	-12.89%	11,005
Logan	3,796	57.85%	2,332	35.54%	290	4.42%	144	2.19%	1,464	22.31%	6,562
Lorain	5,434	56.60%	3,674	38.27%	444	4.63%	48	0.50%	1,760	18.33%	9,600
Lucas	11,211	52.02%	9,860	45.75%	282	1.31%	199	0.92%	1,351	6.27%	21,552
Madison	2,594	50.93%	2,292	45.00%	175	3.44%	32	0.63%	302	5.93%	5,093
Mahoning	5,806	45.54%	6,358	49.87%	350	2.75%	236	1.85%	-552	-4.33%	12,750
Marion	2,477	40.89%	3,282	54.18%	257	4.24%	42	0.69%	-805	-13.29%	6,058
Medina	3,062	56.10%	2,122	38.88%	204	3.74%	70	1.28%	940	17.22%	5,458
Meigs	3,959	59.37%	2,415	36.22%	212	3.18%	82	1.23%	1,544	23.16%	6,668
Mercer	1,526	25.86%	3,688	62.51%	62	1.05%	624	10.58%	-2,162	-36.64%	5,900
Miami	5,110	51.26%	4,271	42.84%	391	3.92%	197	1.98%	839	8.42%	9,969
Monroe	1,630	29.08%	3,838	68.47%	110	1.96%	27	0.48%	-2,208	-39.39%	5,605
Montgomery	13,197	46.88%	14,067	49.97%	598	2.12%	290	1.03%	-870	-3.09%	28,152
Morgan	2,399	51.98%	1,956	42.38%	199	4.31%	61	1.32%	443	9.60%	4,615
Morrow	2,297	49.07%	1,958	41.83%	305	6.52%	121	2.58%	339	7.24%	4,681
Muskingum	6,123	47.78%	6,230	48.62%	360	2.81%	101	0.79%	-107	-0.84%	12,814
Noble	2,307	50.69%	2,026	44.52%	184	4.04%	34	0.75%	281	6.17%	4,551
Ottawa	1,588	34.37%	2,943	63.70%	49	1.06%	40	0.87%	-1,355	-29.33%	4,620
Paulding	2,900	47.53%	2,997	49.12%	123	2.02%	81	1.33%	-97	-1.59%	6,101
Perry	3,359	47.11%	3,430	48.11%	181	2.54%	160	2.24%	-71	-1.00%	7,130
Pickaway	2,953	42.89%	3,759	54.60%	152	2.21%	21	0.31%	-806	-11.71%	6,885
Pike	1,686	44.47%	1,926	50.80%	71	1.87%	108	2.85%	-240	-6.33%	3,791
Portage	3,310	48.83%	2,953	43.57%	324	4.78%	191	2.82%	357	5.27%	6,778
Preble	2,957	49.39%	2,699	45.08%	288	4.81%	43	0.72%	258	4.31%	5,987
Putnam	2,314	33.73%	4,177	60.89%	200	2.92%	169	2.46%	-1,863	-27.16%	6,860
Richland	3,994	40.77%	5,398	55.10%	293	2.99%	111	1.13%	-1,404	-14.33%	9,796
Ross	4,632	49.19%	4,489	47.67%	259	2.75%	37	0.39%	143	1.52%	9,417
Sandusky	2,960	41.25%	3,774	52.60%	157	2.19%	284	3.96%	-814	-11.34%	7,175
Scioto	4,268	55.87%	3,181	41.64%	123	1.61%	67	0.88%	1,087	14.23%	7,639
Seneca	4,195	41.49%	5,378	53.19%	285	2.82%	252	2.49%	-1,183	-11.70%	10,110
Shelby	2,062	37.07%	3,244	58.32%	124	2.23%	132	2.37%	-1,182	-21.25%	5,562
Stark	9,231	44.79%	10,227	49.63%	654	3.17%	496	2.41%	-996	-4.83%	20,608
Summit	6,322	46.45%	6,499	47.75%	447	3.28%	343	2.52%	-177	-1.30%	13,611
Trumbull	5,819	59.45%	3,217	32.87%	582	5.95%	170	1.74%	2,602	26.58%	9,788
Tuscarawas	4,746	42.97%	5,715	51.74%	302	2.73%	282	2.55%	-969	-8.77%	11,045
Union	3,001	54.26%	2,055	37.15%	245	4.43%	230	4.16%	946	17.10%	5,531
Van Wert	3,373	46.52%	3,629	50.06%	191	2.63%	57	0.79%	-256	-3.53%	7,250
Vinton	1,710	48.18%	1,743	49.11%	63	1.78%	33	0.93%	-33	-0.93%	3,549
Warren	3,807	59.00%	2,400	37.19%	179	2.77%	67	1.04%	1,407	21.80%	6,453
Washington	4,845	50.08%	4,524	46.76%	193	1.99%	113	1.17%	321	3.32%	9,675
Wayne	3,752	41.51%	4,702	52.02%	547	6.05%	38	0.42%	-950	-10.51%	9,039
Williams	2,745	46.76%	2,583	44.00%	228	3.88%	314	5.35%	162	2.76%	5,870
Wood	5,314	49.10%	4,748	43.87%	512	4.73%	248	2.29%	566	5.23%	10,822
Wyandot	2,057	40.25%	2,857	55.90%	142	2.78%	55	1.08%	-800	-15.65%	5,111
Totals	405,192	47.66%	404,115	47.53%	26,036	3.06%	14,832	1.74%	1,077	0.13%	850,175

== See also ==
- United States presidential elections in Ohio
