= Crawford Township, Ohio =

Crawford Township, Ohio, may refer to:

- Crawford Township, Coshocton County, Ohio
- Crawford Township, Wyandot County, Ohio
