= Lake Buckhorn, Ohio =

- Census-designated place
- Location within Ohio Location within the United States
- Coordinates: 40°28′28″N 81°54′30″W
- Country: United States
- State: Ohio
- County: Holmes
- Township: Mechanic

Area
  - Total: 2.01 sq mi (5.21 km^{2})
  - Land: 1.76 sq mi (4.55 km^{2})
  - Water: 0.25 sq mi (0.66 km^{2})
- Elevation: 873 ft (266 m)

Population (2020)
  - Total: 720
  - Density: 409.8/sq mi (158.22/km^{2})
- Time zone: UTC-5 (Eastern (EST))
  - Summer (DST): UTC-4 (EDT)
- Area code: 330
- FIPS code: 39-41349
- GNIS feature ID: 2628915
- Website: www.lakebuckhorn.info/index.html

Lake Buckhorn is a census-designated place (CDP) in Mechanic Township, Holmes County, Ohio, United States. As of the 2020 census it had a population of 720. It is a private, members-only gated community. The community is built around 220-acre (89 ha) Lake Buckhorn, a reservoir impounded in 1967.

== Geography ==
Lake Buckhorn is in south-central Holmes County on a tributary of Doughty Creek, a southwest-flowing tributary of Killbuck Creek and part of the Walhonding River watershed flowing to the Ohio River. Ohio State Route 83 forms the eastern boundary of the community. The highway leads north 8 miles (13 km) to Millersburg, the Holmes county seat, and south 16 miles (26 km) to Coshocton.

According to the U.S. Census Bureau, the Lake Buckhorn CDP has a total area of 2.01 square miles (5.21 km^{2}), of which 1.76 square miles (4.55 km^{2}) are land and 0.25 square miles (0.66 km^{2}), or 12.66%, are water.

== Demographics ==
Historical population
Census	Pop.	Note	%±
2020	720		—
U.S. Decennial Census
