= Richland Township, Holmes County, Ohio =

Township in Ohio, US

- Township
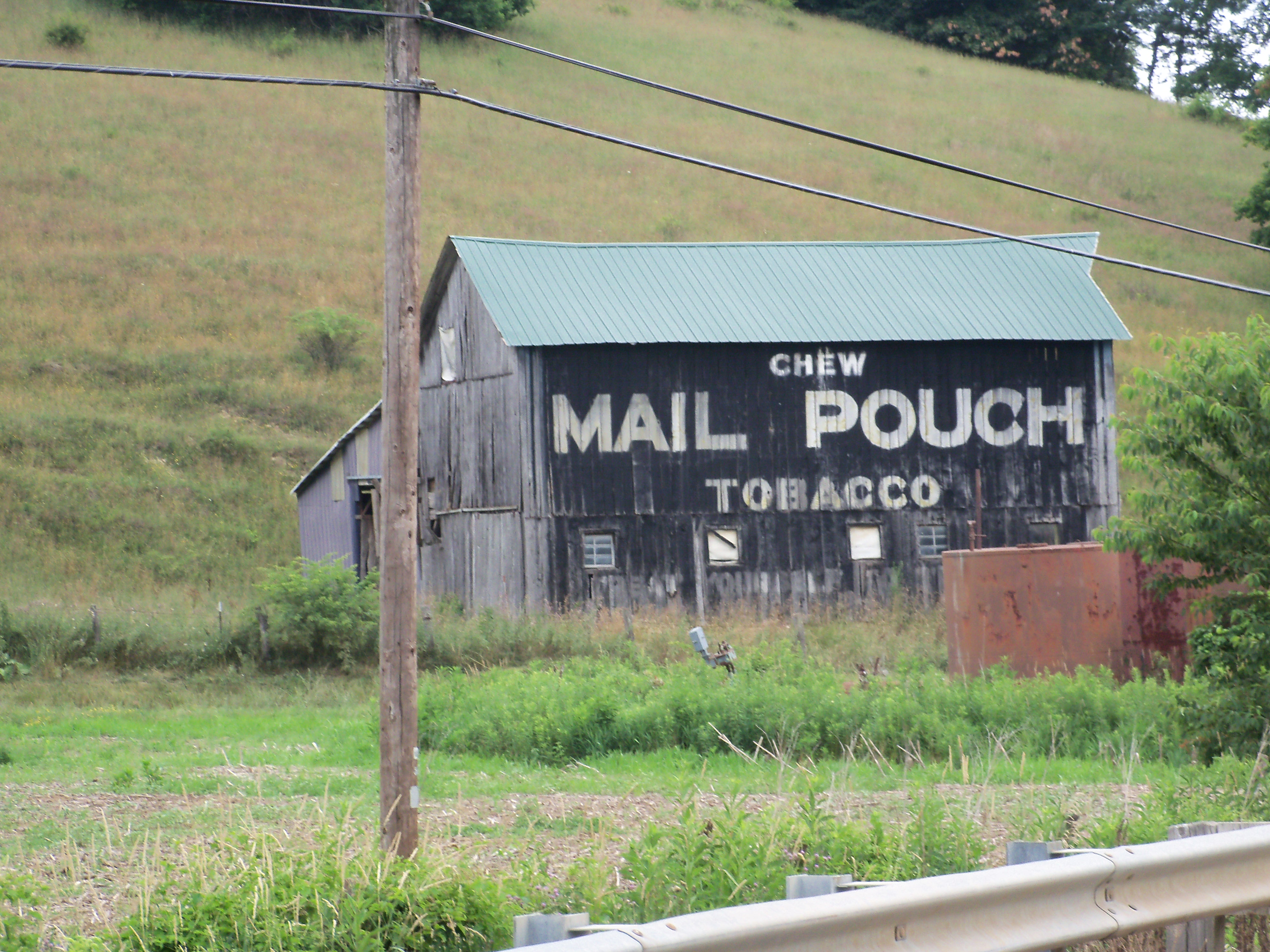
- Mail Pouch Tobacco Barn on U.S. Route 62

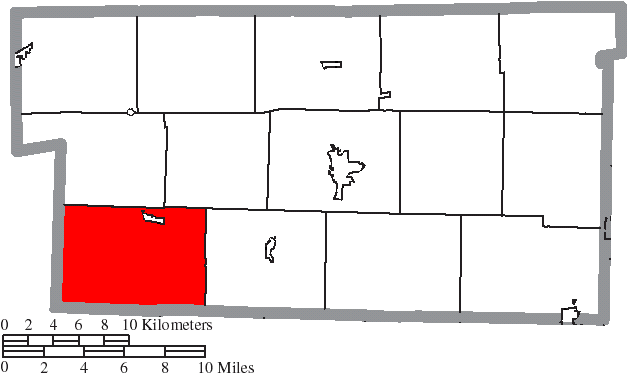
- Location of Richland Township in Holmes County
- Coordinates: 40°29′49″N 82°7′2″W
- Country: United States
- State: Ohio
- County: Holmes

Area
  - Total: 37.36 sq mi (96.76 km^{2})
  - Land: 37.27 sq mi (96.52 km^{2})
  - Water: 0.093 sq mi (0.24 km^{2})
- Elevation: 1,106 ft (337 m)

Population (2020)
  - Total: 1,193
  - Density: 32.01/sq mi (12.36/km^{2})
- Time zone: UTC-5 (Eastern (EST))
  - Summer (DST): UTC-4 (EDT)
- FIPS code: 39-66712
- GNIS feature ID: 1086336

Historical population
Census	Pop.	Note	%±
1990	896		—
2000	1,163		29.8%
2010	1,284		10.4%
2020	1,193		−7.1%
2024 (est.)	1,217		2.0%
US Census:

Richland Township is one of the fourteen townships of Holmes County, Ohio, United States. As of the 2020 census the population was 1,193.

== Geography ==
Located in the southwestern corner of the county, it borders the following townships:

- Knox Township - north
- Monroe Township - northeast
- Killbuck Township - east
- Monroe Township, Coshocton County - southeast
- Tiverton Township, Coshocton County - south
- Union Township, Knox County - southwest
- Jefferson Township, Knox County - northwest

The village of Glenmont is located in northern Richland Township.

== Name and history ==
It is one of twelve Richland Townships statewide.

== Government ==
The township is governed by a three-member board of trustees, who are elected in November of odd-numbered years to a four-year term beginning on the following January 1. Two are elected in the year after the presidential election and one is elected in the year before it. There is also an elected township fiscal officer, who serves a four-year term beginning on April 1 of the year after the election, which is held in November of the year before the presidential election. Vacancies in the fiscal officership or on the board of trustees are filled by the remaining trustees.
