= Monroe Township, Ohio =

Monroe Township, Ohio may refer to:

- Monroe Township, Adams County, Ohio
- Monroe Township, Allen County, Ohio
- Monroe Township, Ashtabula County, Ohio
- Monroe Township, Carroll County, Ohio
- Monroe Township, Clermont County, Ohio
- Monroe Township, Coshocton County, Ohio
- Monroe Township, Darke County, Ohio
- Monroe Township, Guernsey County, Ohio
- Monroe Township, Harrison County, Ohio
- Monroe Township, Henry County, Ohio
- Monroe Township, Holmes County, Ohio
- Monroe Township, Knox County, Ohio
- Monroe Township, Licking County, Ohio
- Monroe Township, Logan County, Ohio
- Monroe Township, Madison County, Ohio
- Monroe Township, Miami County, Ohio
- Monroe Township, Muskingum County, Ohio
- Monroe Township, Perry County, Ohio
- Monroe Township, Pickaway County, Ohio
- Monroe Township, Preble County, Ohio
- Monroe Township, Putnam County, Ohio
- Monroe Township, Richland County, Ohio

== See also ==
- Monroe Township (disambiguation)
