= Monroe Township, Holmes County, Ohio =

Township in Ohio, US

- Township
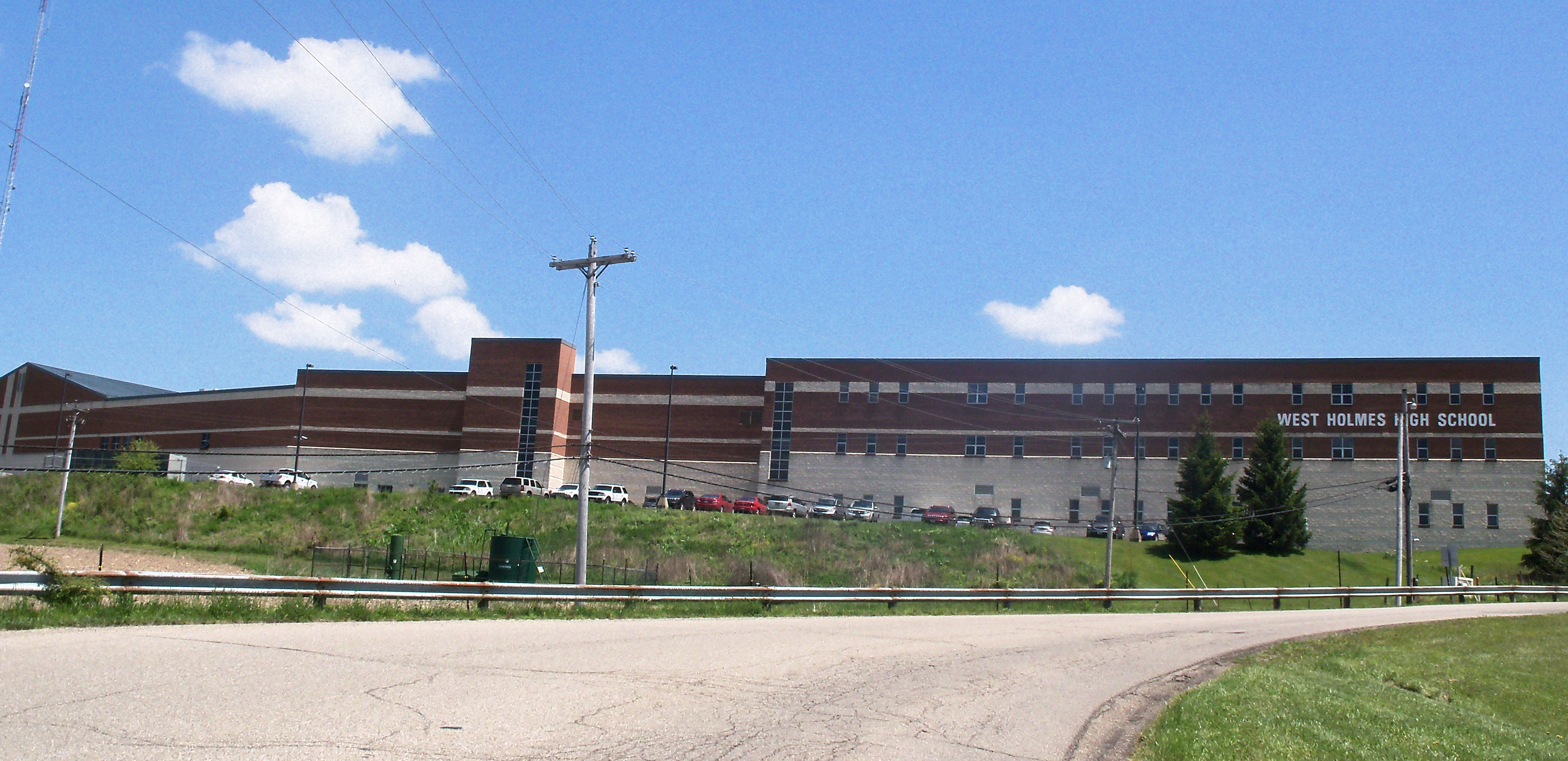
- West Holmes High School on Route 39

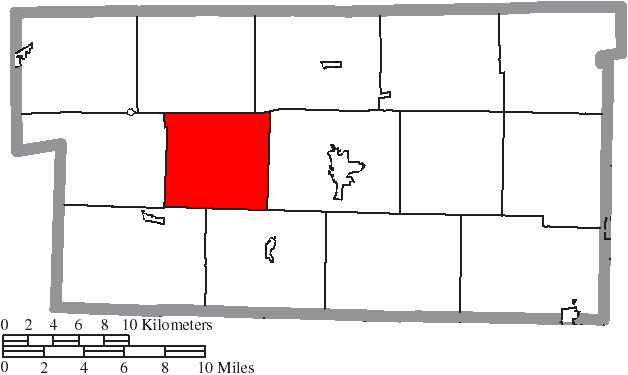
- Location of Monroe Township in Holmes County
- Coordinates: 40°33′52″N 82°1′8″W
- Country: United States
- State: Ohio
- County: Holmes

Area
  - Total: 24.09 sq mi (62.39 km^{2})
  - Land: 24.06 sq mi (62.31 km^{2})
  - Water: 0.031 sq mi (0.08 km^{2})
- Elevation: 1,056 ft (322 m)

Population (2020)
  - Total: 1,605
  - Density: 66.71/sq mi (25.76/km^{2})
- Time zone: UTC-5 (Eastern (EST))
  - Summer (DST): UTC-4 (EDT)
- FIPS code: 39-51422
- GNIS feature ID: 1086333

Historical population
Census	Pop.	Note	%±
1990	1,062		—
2000	1,381		30.0%
2010	1,573		13.9%
2020	1,605		2.0%
2024 (est.)	1,622		1.1%
U.S. Census:

Monroe Township is one of the fourteen townships of Holmes County, Ohio, United States. As of the 2020 census the population was 1,605.

== Geography ==
Located in the west central part of the county, it borders the following townships:

- Ripley Township - north
- Prairie Township - northeast
- Hardy Township - east
- Killbuck Township - southeast
- Richland Township - southwest
- Knox Township - west

No municipalities are located in Monroe Township.

== Name and history ==
It is one of twenty-two Monroe Townships statewide.

== Government ==
The township is governed by a three-member board of trustees, who are elected in November of odd-numbered years to a four-year term beginning on the following January 1. Two are elected in the year after the presidential election and one is elected in the year before it. There is also an elected township fiscal officer, who serves a four-year term beginning on April 1 of the year after the election, which is held in November of the year before the presidential election. Vacancies in the fiscal officership or on the board of trustees are filled by the remaining trustees.
