= Mill Creek Township, Coshocton County, Ohio =

Township in Ohio, US

- Township
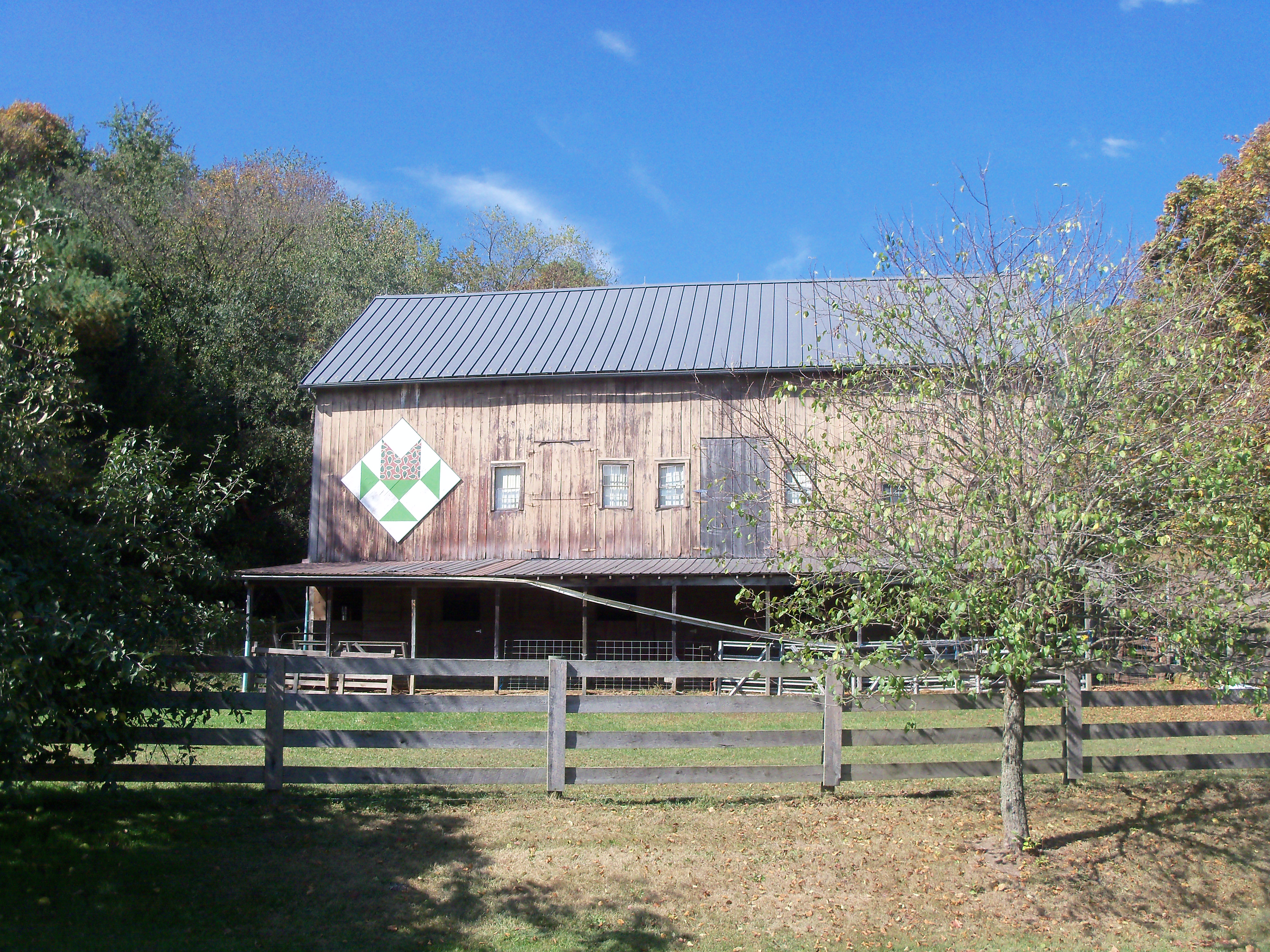
- A barn has a stylized chalice painted on side facing Route 643

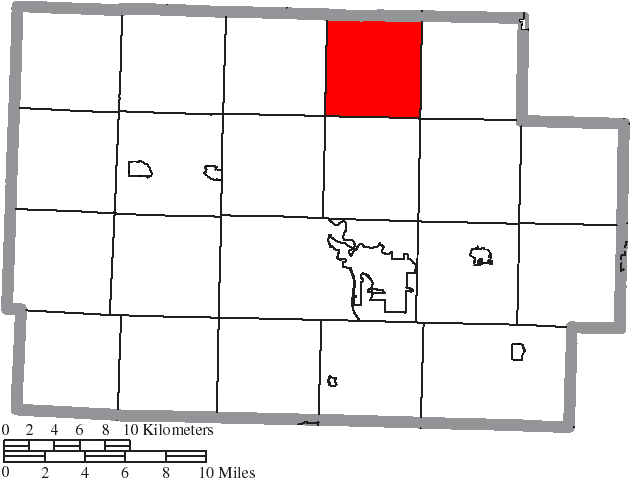
- Location of Mill Creek Township in Coshocton County
- Coordinates: 40°24′38″N 81°51′32″W
- Country: United States
- State: Ohio
- County: Coshocton

Area
  - Total: 23.7 sq mi (61.3 km^{2})
  - Land: 23.7 sq mi (61.3 km^{2})
  - Water: 0 sq mi (0.0 km^{2})
- Elevation: 889 ft (271 m)

Population (2020)
  - Total: 1,032
  - Density: 43.6/sq mi (16.8/km^{2})
- Time zone: UTC-5 (Eastern (EST))
  - Summer (DST): UTC-4 (EDT)
- FIPS code: 39-50274
- GNIS feature ID: 1085921

Mill Creek Township is one of the twenty-two townships of Coshocton County, Ohio, United States. The population as of the 2020 census was 1,032, up from 932 at the previous census.

== Geography ==
Located in the northern part of the county, it borders the following townships:

- Mechanic Township, Holmes County - north
- Clark Township, Holmes County - northeast corner
- Crawford Township - east
- White Eyes Township - southeast corner
- Keene Township - south
- Bethlehem Township - southwest corner
- Clark Township - west

No municipalities are located in Mill Creek Township.

== Demographics ==
Historical population
Census	Pop.	Note	%±
1990	540		—
2000	747		38.3%
2010	932		24.8%
2020	1,032		10.7%
2024 (est.)	1,050		1.7%
U.S. Census:

According to the 2020 "ACS 5-Year Estimates Data Profiles", 37.3% of the township's population spoke only English, while 62.7 spoke an "other [than Spanish] Indo-European language" (basically Pennsylvania German/German).

== Name and history ==
Statewide, other Mill Creek Townships are located in Union and Williams counties and formerly in Hamilton County.

Mill Creek Township was organized in July, 1817.

== Government ==
The township is governed by a three-member board of trustees, who are elected in November of odd-numbered years to a four-year term beginning on the following January 1. Two are elected in the year after the presidential election and one is elected in the year before it. There is also an elected township fiscal officer, who serves a four-year term beginning on April 1 of the year after the election, which is held in November of the year before the presidential election. Vacancies in the fiscal officership or on the board of trustees are filled by the remaining trustees.
