= Trail, Ohio =

Unincorporated community in Ohio, U.S.

- Unincorporated community
- Interactive map of Trail, Ohio
- Coordinates: 40°35′25.22″N 81°42′22.46″W
- Country: United States
- State: Ohio
- County: Holmes County
- Township: Walnut Creek Township
- Named for: Indian Trail
- Elevation: 1,007 ft (307 m)
- Time zone: UTC-5 (EST)
  - Summer (DST): UTC-4 (EDT)
- Postal code: 44624
- Area code: 330

Trail is an unincorporated community in Walnut Creek Township, Holmes County, Ohio, United States.

== History ==
Trail developed along the local Indian Trail, going through the settlement. The trail served as a link between the Wyandot and Mohican Indians and provided a path for Swiss and Irish immigrants to settle. The community was formerly called Indian Trail, because of the local landmark of the same name.

In the late 1800s, the community's post office was established. At first, they were declined by the postal service due to the length of the name "Indian Trail." They dropped "Indian," and changed their name to "Trail."

== Economy ==
In 1912, Michael Troyer purchased a meat market in Trail, selling bologna. He grew the business and sold it to his son, Lloyd, 12 years later. The business continued to expand, operating the town's grocery store and a meat factory, until February 2, 1934, when a fire destroyed the business. The business rebuilt its operations, and remains family-owned. The factory produces approximately 25,000 pounds of bologna a week, averaging around 5,000 pounds a day. The business is named Troyer's Genuine Trail Bologna.
