= Killbuck Township, Holmes County, Ohio =

Township in Ohio, US

- Township
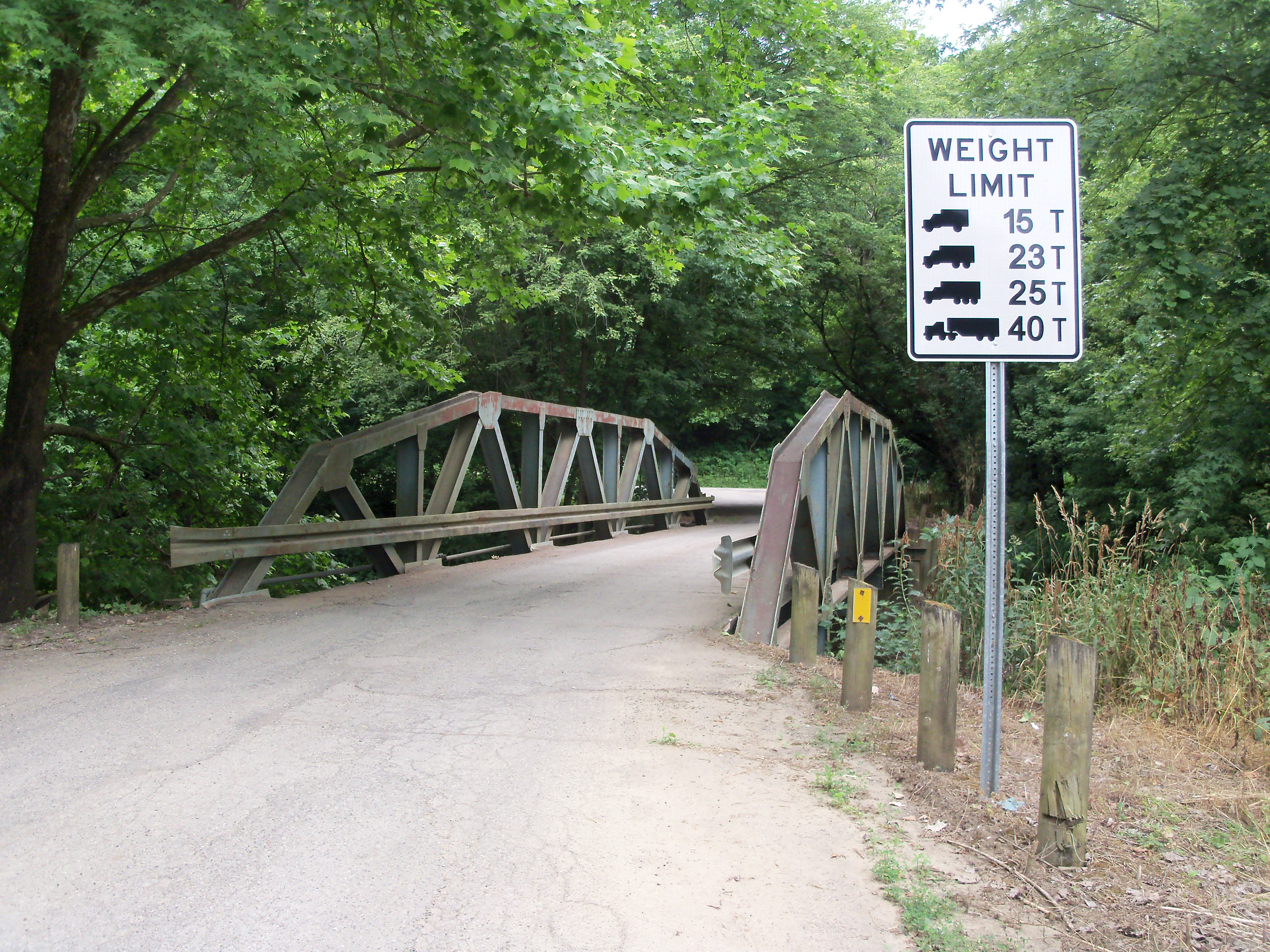
- Township Road 91 crosses Killbuck Creek.

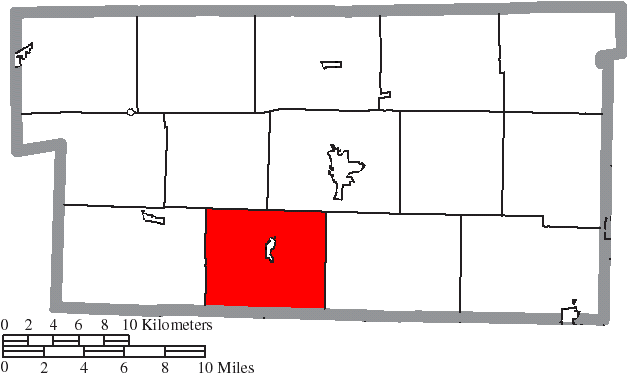
- Location of Killbuck Township in Holmes County
- Coordinates: 40°29′38″N 81°59′5″W
- Country: United States
- State: Ohio
- County: Holmes

Area
  - Total: 30.22 sq mi (78.28 km^{2})
  - Land: 30.17 sq mi (78.14 km^{2})
  - Water: 0.054 sq mi (0.14 km^{2})
- Elevation: 804 ft (245 m)

Population (2020)
  - Total: 1,894
  - Density: 62.78/sq mi (24.24/km^{2})
- Time zone: UTC-5 (Eastern (EST))
  - Summer (DST): UTC-4 (EDT)
- ZIP code: 44637
- Area code: 330
- FIPS code: 39-40194
- GNIS feature ID: 1086330

Historical population
| Census | Pop. | Note | %± |
|---|---|---|---|
| 1990 | 1,818 | | — |
| 2000 | 1,973 | | 8.5% |
| 2010 | 1,977 | | 0.2% |
| 2020 | 1,894 | | −4.2% |
| 2024 (est.) | 1,924 | | 1.6% |
US Census:

Killbuck Township is one of the fourteen townships of Holmes County, Ohio, United States. As of the 2020 census the population was 1,894.

== Geography ==
Located in the southern part of the county, it borders the following townships:

- Hardy Township - northeast
- Mechanic Township - east
- Clark Township, Coshocton County - southeast
- Monroe Township, Coshocton County - southwest
- Richland Township - west
- Monroe Township - northwest

The village of Killbuck is located in central Killbuck Township.

== Name and history ==
It is the only Killbuck Township statewide.

== Government ==
The township is governed by a three-member board of trustees, who are elected in November of odd-numbered years to a four-year term beginning on the following January 1. Two are elected in the year after the presidential election and one is elected in the year before it. There is also an elected township fiscal officer, who serves a four-year term beginning on April 1 of the year after the election, which is held in November of the year before the presidential election. Vacancies in the fiscal officership or on the board of trustees are filled by the remaining trustees.
