= Spring Mountain, Ohio =

Unincorporated community in Ohio, United States

Coordinates: 40°24′31″N 82°03′03″W

Spring Mountain is an unincorporated community in Monroe Township, Coshocton County, Ohio, United States.

== History ==
Spring Mountain was laid out in 1836. The town was previously known as Ridge. Another early variant name was Van Buren. A post office was established under the name Ridge in 1850, the name was changed to Spring Mountain 1858, and the post office closed in 1919.
