= Mechanic Township, Holmes County, Ohio =

Township in Ohio, US

- Township
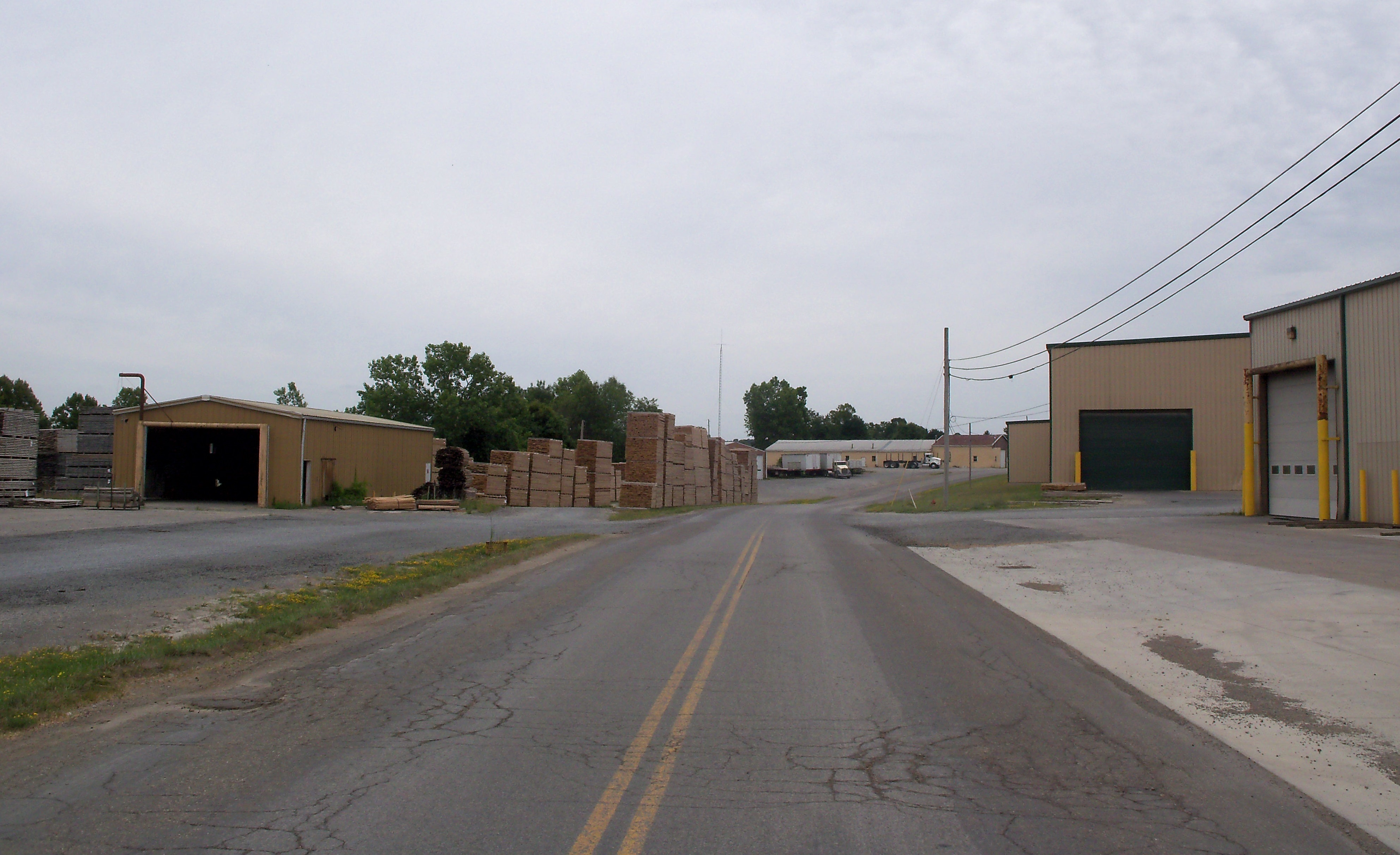
- Rough cut hardwood lumber stacked to dry next to County Road 407

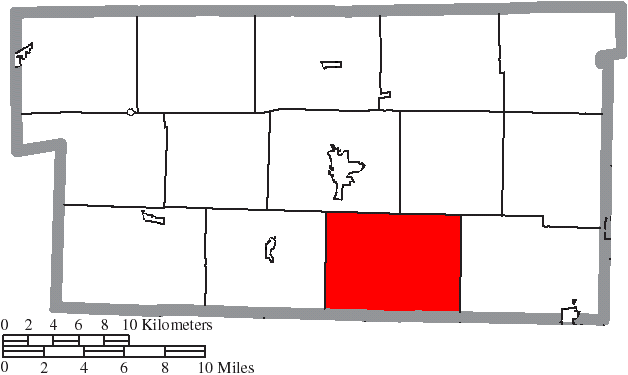
- Location of Mechanic Township in Holmes County
- Coordinates: 40°28′54″N 81°52′7″W
- Country: United States
- State: Ohio
- County: Holmes

Area
  - Total: 34.07 sq mi (88.25 km^{2})
  - Land: 33.73 sq mi (87.36 km^{2})
  - Water: 0.34 sq mi (0.89 km^{2})
- Elevation: 1,037 ft (316 m)

Population (2020)
  - Total: 3,222
  - Density: 95.52/sq mi (36.88/km^{2})
- Time zone: UTC-5 (Eastern (EST))
  - Summer (DST): UTC-4 (EDT)
- FIPS code: 39-48692
- GNIS feature ID: 1086332

Historical population
Census	Pop.	Note	%±
1990	2,052		—
2000	2,652		29.2%
2010	3,127		17.9%
2020	3,222		3.0%
2024 (est.)	3,256		1.1%
US Census:

Mechanic Township is one of the fourteen townships of Holmes County, Ohio, United States. As of the 2020 census the population was 3,222.

== Geography ==
Located in the southern part of the county, it borders the following townships:

- Berlin Township - northeast
- Clark Township - east
- Crawford Township, Coshocton County - southeast corner
- Mill Creek Township, Coshocton County - south
- Clark Township, Coshocton County - southwest
- Killbuck Township - west
- Hardy Township - northwest

No municipalities are located in Mechanic Township, although the census-designated place of Lake Buckhorn is located within the township.

== Name and history ==
It is the only Mechanic Township statewide.

== Government ==
The township is governed by a three-member board of trustees, who are elected in November of odd-numbered years to a four-year term beginning on the following January 1. Two are elected in the year after the presidential election and one is elected in the year before it. There is also an elected township fiscal officer, who serves a four-year term beginning on April 1 of the year after the election, which is held in November of the year before the presidential election. Vacancies in the fiscal officership or on the board of trustees are filled by the remaining trustees.
