= Kilbuck =

Kilbuck may refer to:

- John and Edith Kilbuck, Moravian missionaries in Alaska in the 19th/20th centuries
- Kilbuck Township, Allegheny County, Pennsylvania, U.S.

== See also ==
- Killbuck (disambiguation)
