= Bethlehem Township, Ohio =

Bethlehem Township, Ohio, may refer to:

- Bethlehem Township, Stark County, Ohio
- Bethlehem Township, Coshocton County, Ohio
