= Crawford Township, Coshocton County, Ohio =

Township in Ohio, US

- Township
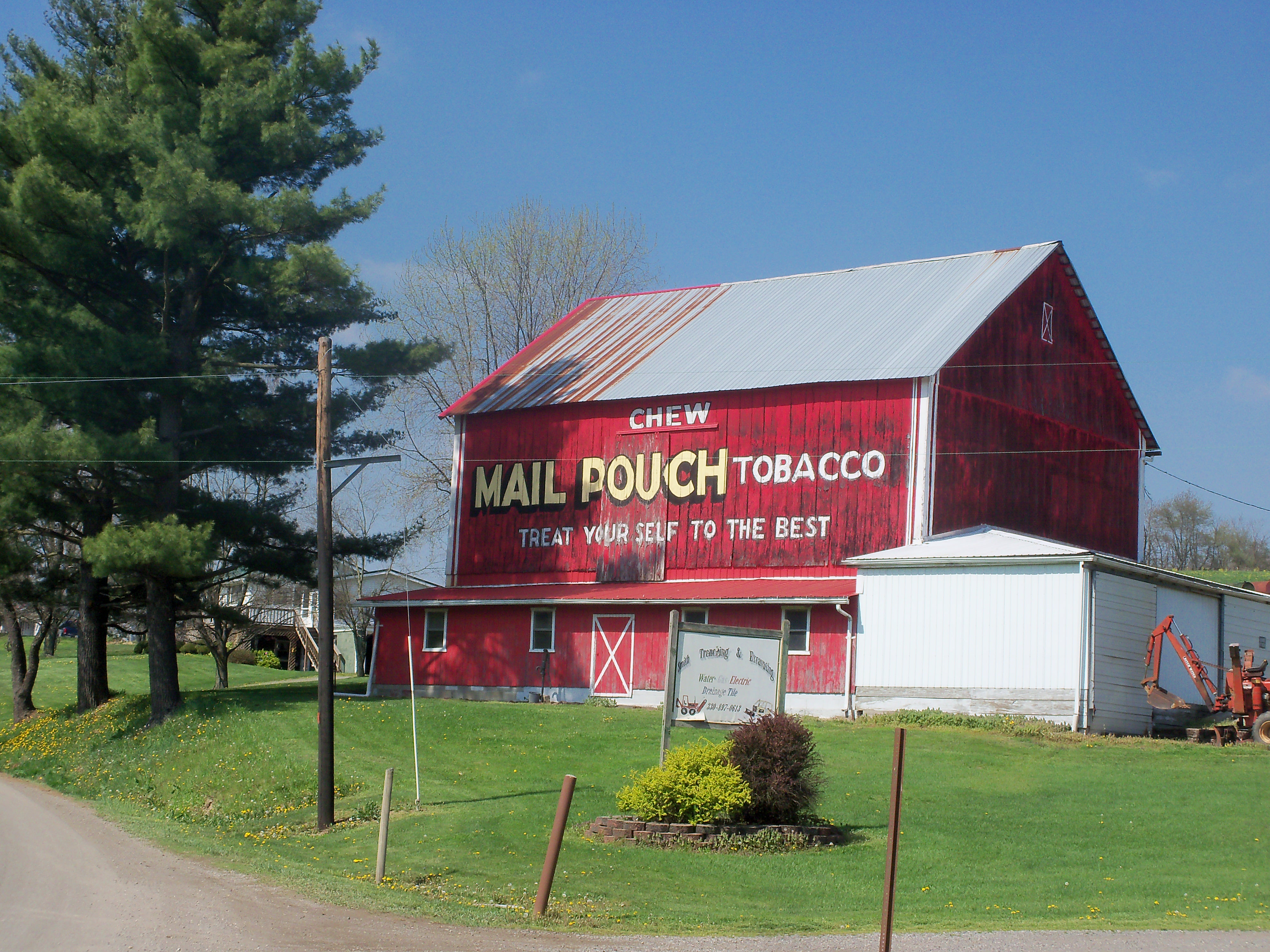
- A red Mail Pouch barn on Ohio State Route 93

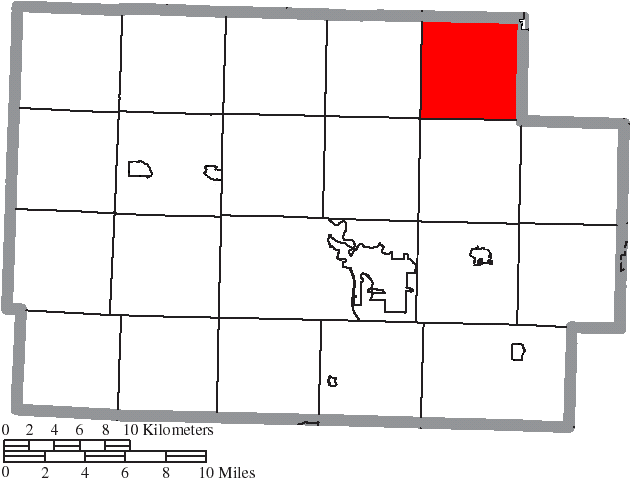
- Location of Crawford Township in Coshocton County
- Coordinates: 40°24′27″N 81°45′8″W
- Country: United States
- State: Ohio
- County: Coshocton

Area
  - Total: 25.5 sq mi (66.0 km^{2})
  - Land: 25.5 sq mi (66.0 km^{2})
  - Water: 0 sq mi (0.0 km^{2})
- Elevation: 860 ft (262 m)

Population (2020)
  - Total: 1,950
  - Density: 76.5/sq mi (29.5/km^{2})
- Time zone: UTC-5 (Eastern (EST))
  - Summer (DST): UTC-4 (EDT)
- FIPS code: 39-19218
- GNIS feature ID: 1085914

Historical population
Census	Pop.	Note	%±
1990	1,221		—
2000	1,594		30.5%
2010	1,858		16.6%
2020	1,950		5.0%
2024 (est.)	1,971		1.1%
U.S. Census:

Crawford Township is one of the twenty-two townships of Coshocton County, Ohio, United States. As of the 2020 census the population was 1,950.

== Geography ==
Located in the northeastern corner of the county, it borders the following townships:

- Clark Township, Holmes County - north
- Bucks Township, Tuscarawas County - east
- Adams Township - southeast corner
- White Eyes Township - south
- Keene Township - southwest corner
- Mill Creek Township - west
- Mechanic Township, Holmes County - northwest corner

Part of the village of Baltic is located in the northeastern corner of Crawford Township. Crawford Township contains the unincorporated community of Chili.

== Name and history ==
Crawford Township was organized in 1828. It was likely named for Associate Judge Crawford, a landowner.

Statewide, the only other Crawford Township is located in Wyandot County.

== Government ==
The township is governed by a three-member board of trustees, who are elected in November of odd-numbered years to a four-year term beginning on the following January 1. Two are elected in the year after the presidential election and one is elected in the year before it. There is also an elected township fiscal officer, who serves a four-year term beginning on April 1 of the year after the election, which is held in November of the year before the presidential election. Vacancies in the fiscal officership or on the board of trustees are filled by the remaining trustees.
