= Holmes County, Ohio =

County in Ohio, United States

- County
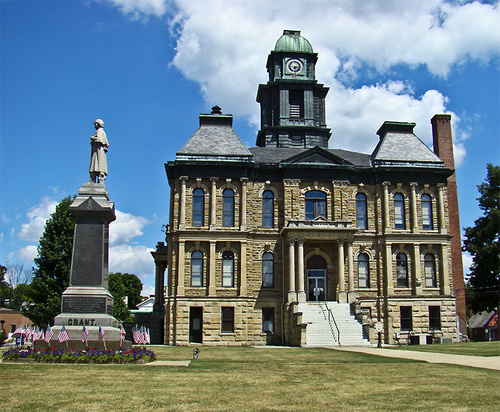
- Holmes County Courthouse, with the Grant Memorial Statue

- Flag Seal

- Location within the U.S. state of Ohio
- Coordinates: 40°34′N 81°56′W
- Country: United States
- State: Ohio
- Founded: January 4, 1825
- Named for: Andrew Holmes
- Seat: Millersburg
- Largest village: Millersburg

Area
  - Total: 424 sq mi (1,100 km^{2})
  - Land: 423 sq mi (1,100 km^{2})
  - Water: 1.4 sq mi (3.6 km^{2}) 0.3%

Population (2020)
  - Total: 44,223
  - Estimate (2025): 44,970 ▲
  - Density: 106.3/sq mi (41.0/km^{2})
- Time zone: UTC−5 (Eastern)
  - Summer (DST): UTC−4 (EDT)
- Congressional districts: 7th, 12th
- Website: www.co.holmes.oh.us

Holmes County is a county in the U.S. state of Ohio. As of the 2020 Census, the population was 44,223. Its county seat is Millersburg. The county was formed in 1824 from portions of Coshocton, Tuscarawas and Wayne counties and organized the following year. It was named after Andrew Holmes, an officer killed in the War of 1812.

Holmes County, which was about 42% Amish in 2010, and 48% in 2020, has the highest concentration of Amish in the world, which draws many visitors to the county. The Holmes Amish settlement, which also includes Amish from neighboring counties, is the second-largest in the world after Lancaster County, Pennsylvania, and numbered 37,770 people in 2021.

== History ==
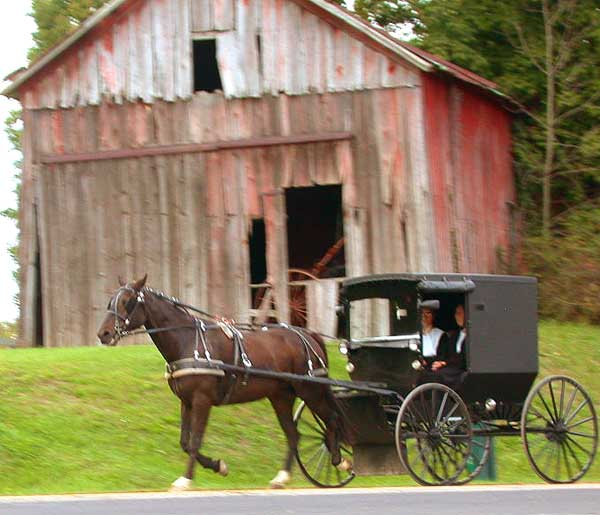
Amish couple in a horse-drawn buggy in rural Holmes County

Holmes County was formed on January 20, 1824, from portions of Coshocton, Tuscarawas and Wayne counties. It was named after Major Andrew Holmes, who was killed in action at the Battle of Mackinac Island.

In 1863, during the Civil War, numerous small anti-draft riots took place, mainly in the German-speaking areas. Holmes County at the time was a Democratic stronghold, dominated by its Pennsylvania Dutch settlers, along with many recent German immigrants. With the passage of the Conscription Act in March 1863, Holmes County politicians denounced both Congress and President Lincoln as despotic, saying that forced military service was little different from slavery. Conscription had been common in their former German homelands, and it was one of the reasons they had moved to America. Violent protests broke out in June, and they continued until the Union Army marched into the county and declared martial law. Stephen E. Towne in 2019, using archival records, argues that many of the resisters belonged to secret organizations that opposed Union tactics to defeat the Confederacy.

In the spring of 1892, a Black man from Mt. Vernon or Wooster, Ohio, whose name remains unknown, was walking through the county. After he had been in town for a few days, a group of white people decided to lynch him because he “lingered about people’s doorsteps and angered them in various ways.” On April 1, 1892, a mob gathered after nightfall, abducted the man, and hanged him from a tree in the public square in front of the county courthouse.

== Geography ==
According to the U.S. Census Bureau, the county has a total area of 424 square miles (1,100 km^{2}), of which 423 square miles (1,100 km^{2}) is land and 1.4 square miles (3.6 km^{2}) (0.3%) is water.

=== Adjacent counties ===
- Wayne County (north)
- Stark County (northeast)
- Tuscarawas County (southeast)
- Coshocton County (south)
- Knox County (southwest)
- Ashland County (northwest)

== Demographics ==
Historical population
Census	Pop.	Note	%±
1830	9,135		—
1840	18,088		98.0%
1850	20,452		13.1%
1860	20,589		0.7%
1870	18,177		−11.7%
1880	20,776		14.3%
1890	21,139		1.7%
1900	19,511		−7.7%
1910	17,909		−8.2%
1920	16,965		−5.3%
1930	16,726		−1.4%
1940	17,876		6.9%
1950	18,760		4.9%
1960	21,591		15.1%
1970	23,024		6.6%
1980	29,416		27.8%
1990	32,849		11.7%
2000	38,943		18.6%
2010	42,366		8.8%
2020	44,223		4.4%
2025 (est.)	44,970	▲	1.7%
U.S. Decennial Census:

=== 2020 census ===
As of the 2020 census, the county had a population of 44,223. The median age was 31.1 years. 31.0% of residents were under the age of 18 and 14.3% of residents were 65 years of age or older. For every 100 females there were 101.1 males, and for every 100 females age 18 and over there were 98.8 males age 18 and over.

The racial makeup of the county was 97.4% White, 0.3% Black or African American, 0.1% American Indian and Alaska Native, 0.1% Asian, <0.1% Native Hawaiian and Pacific Islander, 0.3% from some other race, and 1.8% from two or more races. Hispanic or Latino residents of any race comprised 1.1% of the population.

The most commonly reported ancestries were German (23.8%), English (23.2%), Pennsylvania German (4.8%), Swiss (3.9%), and Irish (3.8%).

<0.1% of residents lived in urban areas, while 100.0% lived in rural areas.

There were 13,490 households in the county, of which 39.2% had children under the age of 18 living in them. Of all households, 67.3% were married-couple households, 12.5% were households with a male householder and no spouse or partner present, and 16.9% were households with a female householder and no spouse or partner present. About 19.6% of all households were made up of individuals and 9.6% had someone living alone who was 65 years of age or older.

There were 14,588 housing units, of which 7.5% were vacant. Among occupied housing units, 75.0% were owner-occupied and 25.0% were renter-occupied. The homeowner vacancy rate was 0.5% and the rental vacancy rate was 6.2%.

=== Racial and ethnic composition ===
Holmes County, Ohio – racial and ethnic composition Note: the US Census treats Hispanic/Latino as an ethnic category. This table excludes Latinos from the racial categories and assigns them to a separate category. Hispanics/Latinos may be of any race.
Race / ethnicity (NH = Non-Hispanic)	Pop 1980	Pop 1990	Pop 2000	Pop 2010	Pop 2020	% 1980	% 1990	% 2000	% 2010	% 2020
White alone (NH)	29,201	32,607	38,330	41,607	42,875	99.27%	99.26%	98.43%	98.21%	96.95%
Black or African American alone (NH)	10	52	122	123	119	0.03%	0.16%	0.31%	0.29%	0.27%
Native American or Alaska Native alone (NH)	34	21	20	22	33	0.12%	0.06%	0.05%	0.05%	0.07%
Asian alone (NH)	21	43	20	49	64	0.07%	0.13%	0.05%	0.12%	0.14%
Native Hawaiian or Pacific Islander alone (NH)	x	x	3	19	5	x	x	0.01%	0.04%	0.01%
Other race alone (NH)	9	3	9	16	41	0.03%	0.01%	0.02%	0.04%	0.09%
Mixed-race or multiracial (NH)	x	x	147	201	612	x	x	0.38%	0.47%	1.38%
Hispanic or Latino (any race)	141	123	292	329	474	0.48%	0.37%	0.75%	0.78%	1.07%
Total	29,416	32,849	38,943	42,366	44,223	100.00%	100.00%	100.00%	100.00%	100.00%

=== 2010 census ===
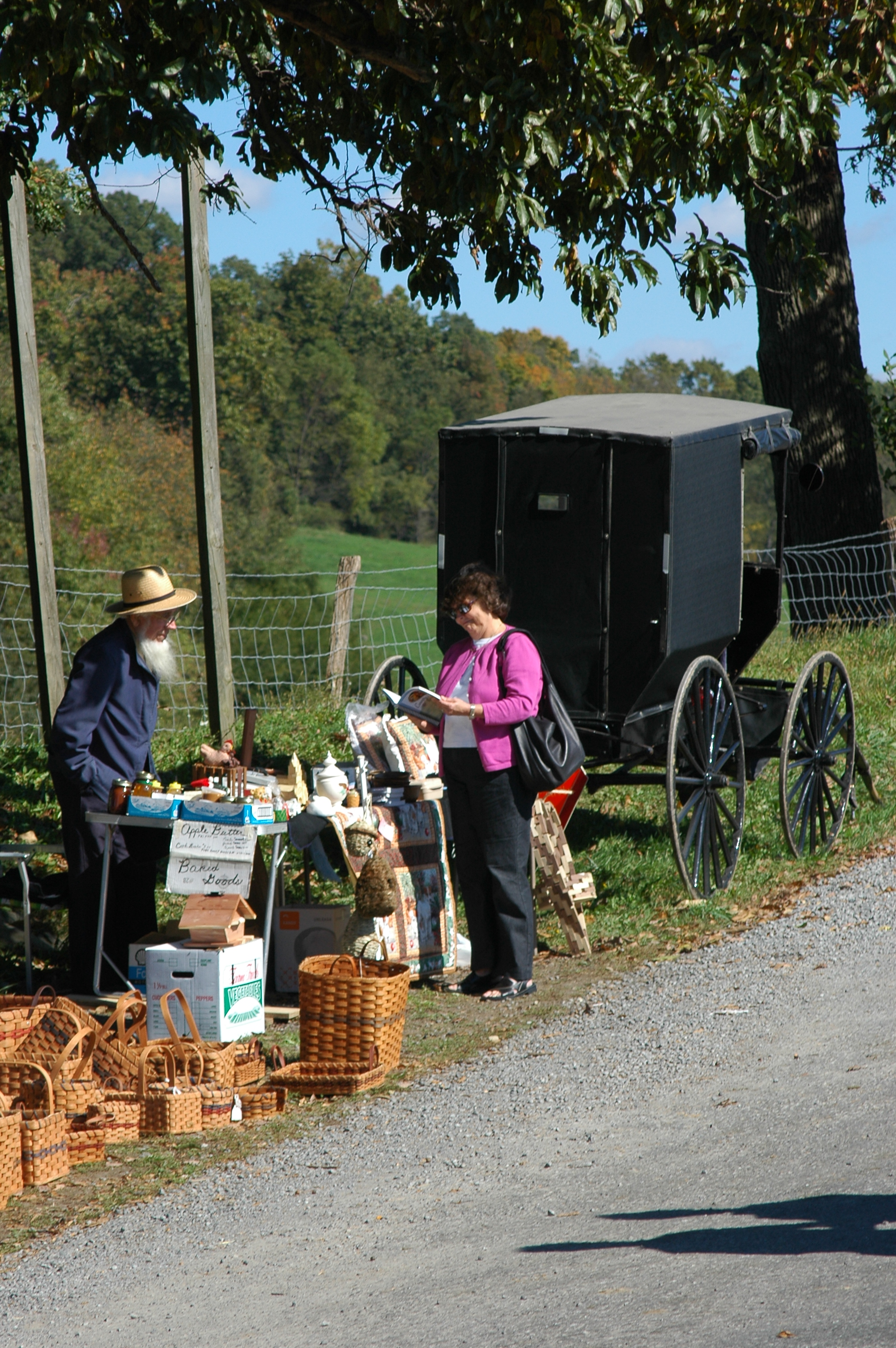
Old Amish man selling different items, including wicker baskets in the County.

As of the 2010 United States census, there were 42,366 people, 12,554 households, and 10,035 families living in the county. The population density was 100.3 inhabitants per square mile (38.7/km^{2}). There were 13,666 housing units at an average density of 32.3 units per square mile (12.5 units/km^{2}). The racial makeup of the county was 98.7% white, 0.3% black or African American, 0.1% Asian, 0.1% American Indian, 0.2% from other races, and 0.5% from two or more races. Those of Hispanic or Latino origin made up 0.8% of the population. In terms of ancestry, 37.8% were German, 10.8% were American, 6.6% were Irish, and 6.3% were English.

Of the 12,554 households, 42.9% had children under the age of 18 living with them, 69.7% were married couples living together, 6.9% had a female householder with no husband present, 20.1% were non-families, and 17.2% of all households were made up of individuals. The average household size was 3.31 and the average family size was 3.80. The median age was 29.7 years.

The median income for a household in the county was $43,533 and the median income for a family was $49,133. Males had a median income of $36,644 versus $24,317 for females. The per capita income for the county was $17,009. About 10.5% of families and 13.3% of the population were below the poverty line, including 18.9% of those under age 18 and 6.9% of those age 65 or over.

=== 2000 census ===
As of the census of 2000, there were 38,943 people, 11,337 households, and 9,194 families living in the county. The population density was 92 people per square mile (36 people/km^{2}). There were 12,280 housing units at an average density of 29 units per square mile (11/km^{2}). The racial makeup of the county was 99.03% White, 0.33% Black or African American, 0.06% Native American, 0.06% Asian, 0.01% Pacific Islander, 0.13% from other races, and 0.40% from two or more races. Hispanic or Latino people of any race were 0.75% of the population. 56.1% spoke English, 20.1% Pennsylvania German, 15.8% German and 7.1% "Dutch, i.e. Pennsylvania Dutch." as their first language.

There were 11,337 households, out of which 44.30% had children under the age of 18 living with them, 71.50% were married couples living together, 6.50% had a female householder with no husband present, and 18.90% were non-families. 16.10% of all households were made up of individuals, and 6.90% had someone living alone who was 65 years of age or older. The average household size was 3.35 and the average family size was 3.82. Religious breakdown for those who gave a religion (68.33 of the total population) was 89.79% Evangelical Protestant, 8.04% Mainline Protestant and 2.16% Catholic. There were 140 Amish congregations with 17,654 adherents. There were several other unrelated Amish congregations and Mennonite congregations. There was one Catholic congregation.

In the county, the population was spread out, with 35.60% under the age of 18, 10.40% from 18 to 24, 25.70% from 25 to 44, 17.80% from 45 to 64, and 10.50% who were 65 years of age or older. The median age was 28 years. For every 100 females there were 99.60 males. For every 100 females age 18 and over, there were 95.50 males.

The median income for a household in the county was $36,944, and the median income for a family was $40,230. Males had a median income of $28,490 versus $20,602 for females. The per capita income for the county was $14,197. About 10.50% of families and 12.90% of the population were below the poverty line, including 17.40% of those under age 18 and 13.30% of those age 65 or over.

Holmes County has a relatively high number of residents who do not speak English at home. According to the 2000 census, almost 36% of the population speak either Pennsylvania German or German at home, and a further 7% speak "Dutch", i.e. Pennsylvania Dutch. 42.92% of the total population and 50.28% of the children in 5-17 age range uses German/Pennsylvania German or "Dutch" at home.

=== Amish community ===
The Amish community in Holmes County established in 1808, had 17,654 adherents in 2010, or 41.7% of the county's population.

== Religion ==
Religion in Holmes County, according to ARDA (2020)
1. Anabaptist churches (Amish and Mennonite) (54.7%)
2. Other Evangelical churches (17.4%)
3. Mainline Protestant churches (3.80%)
4. Catholic Church (0.70%)
5. None (23.4%)

Religion in Holmes County, according to ARDA (2020)
Religion	2000		2010		2020	
Religion	Number	%	Number	%	Number	%
Christianity	17,946	46.1	28,945	68.4	33,780	76.6
— Anabaptist Churches	11,198 (7,420 Amish)	28.7	21,766 (17,654 Amish)	51.4	24,094 (19,793 Amish)	54.7
— Other Evangelical Churches	3,683	9.5	4,228	10.0	7,692	17.4
— Catholic Church	524	1.4	625	1.5	303	0.7
— Mainline Protestant Churches	2,541	6.5	2,327	5.5	1,691	3.8
Other religions	0	0.0	3	0.0	0	0.0
None*	21,049	53.9	14,866	31.6	10,443	23.4
Total population	38,943		42,366		44,223	
* "None" is an unclear category. It is a heterogenous group of the not religious and intermittently religious. Researchers argue that most of the "Nones" should be considered "unchurched", rather than objectively nonreligious; especially since most "Nones" do hold some religious-spiritual beliefs and a notable amount participate in religious behaviors. For example, 72% of American "Nones" believe in God or a higher power.

== Economy ==
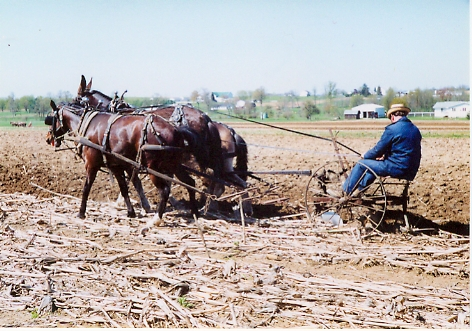
Amish farmer plowing fields with horses

Tourism is an important part of the economy. In 2017, Holmes County was the second most popular tourist destination in Ohio. Tourism is centered on the Amish community, which makes up almost half the county's population, the highest density in the world.

== Politics ==
Prior to 1944, Holmes County was a stronghold of the Democratic Party in presidential elections, with every Democratic presidential candidate from 1856 to 1940, except for Al Smith, carrying the county. The county has since become a Republican stronghold, with Lyndon B. Johnson being the only Democrat since 1940 to carry it, in his 1964 landslide, although Harry S. Truman came within just 16 votes of winning it in 1948.

The high Amish population means that a large proportion of residents in Holmes County do not vote, even compared to turnout standards in much of the United States. These low figures are likely due to the Amish's tendency to abstain from politics.

United States presidential election results for Holmes County, Ohio
Year	Republican		Democratic		Third party(ies)	
Year	No.	%	No.	%	No.	%
1856	1,285	37.87%	2,103	61.98%	5	0.15%
1860	1,392	37.41%	2,281	61.30%	48	1.29%
1864	1,066	28.45%	2,681	71.55%	0	0.00%
1868	1,083	27.47%	2,859	72.53%	0	0.00%
1872	1,089	30.08%	2,530	69.89%	1	0.03%
1876	1,241	28.12%	3,171	71.84%	2	0.05%
1880	1,370	29.36%	3,281	70.30%	16	0.34%
1884	1,366	28.57%	3,368	70.43%	48	1.00%
1888	1,241	25.81%	3,388	70.45%	180	3.74%
1892	1,152	25.56%	3,151	69.91%	204	4.53%
1896	1,284	25.93%	3,622	73.16%	45	0.91%
1900	1,269	26.83%	3,394	71.75%	67	1.42%
1904	1,377	34.77%	2,486	62.78%	97	2.45%
1908	1,252	28.74%	3,043	69.84%	62	1.42%
1912	465	12.81%	2,429	66.90%	737	20.30%
1916	955	24.71%	2,846	73.64%	64	1.66%
1920	2,065	38.78%	3,211	60.30%	49	0.92%
1924	1,824	38.26%	2,539	53.25%	405	8.49%
1928	3,457	67.43%	1,631	31.81%	39	0.76%
1932	1,953	31.60%	4,096	66.28%	131	2.12%
1936	2,247	34.93%	4,097	63.70%	88	1.37%
1940	3,201	48.87%	3,349	51.13%	0	0.00%
1944	3,093	54.69%	2,563	45.31%	0	0.00%
1948	2,496	50.10%	2,480	49.78%	6	0.12%
1952	3,891	65.07%	2,089	34.93%	0	0.00%
1956	3,955	68.78%	1,795	31.22%	0	0.00%
1960	4,432	69.41%	1,953	30.59%	0	0.00%
1964	2,106	37.18%	3,559	62.82%	0	0.00%
1968	3,350	58.47%	1,898	33.13%	481	8.40%
1972	3,752	69.97%	1,507	28.11%	103	1.92%
1976	2,870	54.16%	2,242	42.31%	187	3.53%
1980	3,860	60.37%	2,094	32.75%	440	6.88%
1984	5,146	74.11%	1,737	25.01%	61	0.88%
1988	5,064	69.22%	2,179	29.78%	73	1.00%
1992	5,079	56.08%	1,969	21.74%	2,008	22.17%
1996	5,213	57.39%	2,531	27.86%	1,340	14.75%
2000	6,754	73.85%	2,066	22.59%	325	3.55%
2004	8,468	75.47%	2,697	24.04%	55	0.49%
2008	7,720	69.34%	3,141	28.21%	273	2.45%
2012	8,702	75.23%	2,608	22.55%	257	2.22%
2016	8,720	78.52%	1,788	16.10%	598	5.38%
2020	10,796	83.19%	1,994	15.36%	188	1.45%
2024	10,384	83.84%	1,854	14.97%	148	1.19%

United States Senate election results for Holmes County, Ohio1
Year	Republican		Democratic		Third party(ies)	
Year	No.	%	No.	%	No.	%
2024	9,699	79.52%	2,117	17.36%	381	3.12%

== Transportation ==
The Holmes County Airport is located two nautical miles (2.3 mi; 3.7 km) west-southwest of Millersburg's central business district.

== Communities ==
Township	Village	Other places in township
Berlin		Berlin (CDP)
Clark	Baltic (north part)	Charm (UIC); Farmerstown (UIC); Unionville (UIC)
Hardy	Millersburg (county seat)	Holmes County Airport
Killbuck	Killbuck	
Knox	Nashville (south part)	
Mechanic		Lake Buckhorn (CDP); Becks Mills; Saltillo
Monroe		Welcome (UIC); West Holmes High School
Paint		Winesburg (CDP)
Prairie	Holmesville	
Richland	Glenmont	Stillwell
Ripley		Big Prairie (UIC)
Salt Creek		Mt. Hope (CDP)
Walnut Creek		Walnut Creek (CDP); Trail (UIC)
Washington	Loudonville (east part); Nashville (north part)	Lakeville (UIC)

CDP = Census-designated place
UIC = Unincorporated community

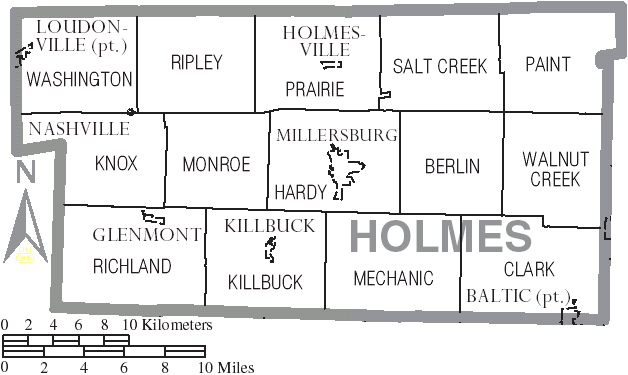
Map of Holmes County, Ohio, with municipal and township labels

== Amish community ==
A large Amish community of about 36,000 exists in Northeast-Central Ohio, centered on Holmes County and extending into surrounding counties. The Holmes Old Order Amish affiliation, with 140 church districts out of 221 in the Holmes County Amish settlement in 2009, is the main and dominant Amish affiliation. Holmes County houses the highest percentage of Amish of any U.S. county, currently 42 percent of the population, and experts speculate that by 2027, Holmes County could become the first county in the US where more than half the residents are Amish.

The Amish & Mennonite Heritage Center in Berlin explains traditional ways of the Amish and provides an illustrated history for visitors in its 10-foot-by-265-foot mural.

The overall Amish population of the area, centered on Holmes County, is the largest Amish community in the world. Called locally "Amish Country", it draws many visitors to the county, thus making tourism an important sector of the local economy.

In Holmes County Amish Settlements there are several Old Order Amish affiliations. The Holmes Old Order Amish affiliation is the main and original affiliation, the Swartzentruber Amish with three subgroups, that originated in 1917 in Holmes County, are the most conservative Amish in Holmes county. There are also Andy Weaver Amish (formed 1952), Stutzman-Troyer Amish, Old Order Tobe Amish and Roman Amish on the conservative side, whereas the New Order Amish (formed in the early 1960s), the New Order Tobe Amish the New Order Amish Christian Fellowship are on the more progressive side. Holmes County is home of more Amish affiliations than any other place in the world.

== See also ==
- National Register of Historic Places listings in Holmes County, Ohio
- USS Holmes County (LST-836)
