= Clark Township, Coshocton County, Ohio =

Township in Ohio, US

- Township
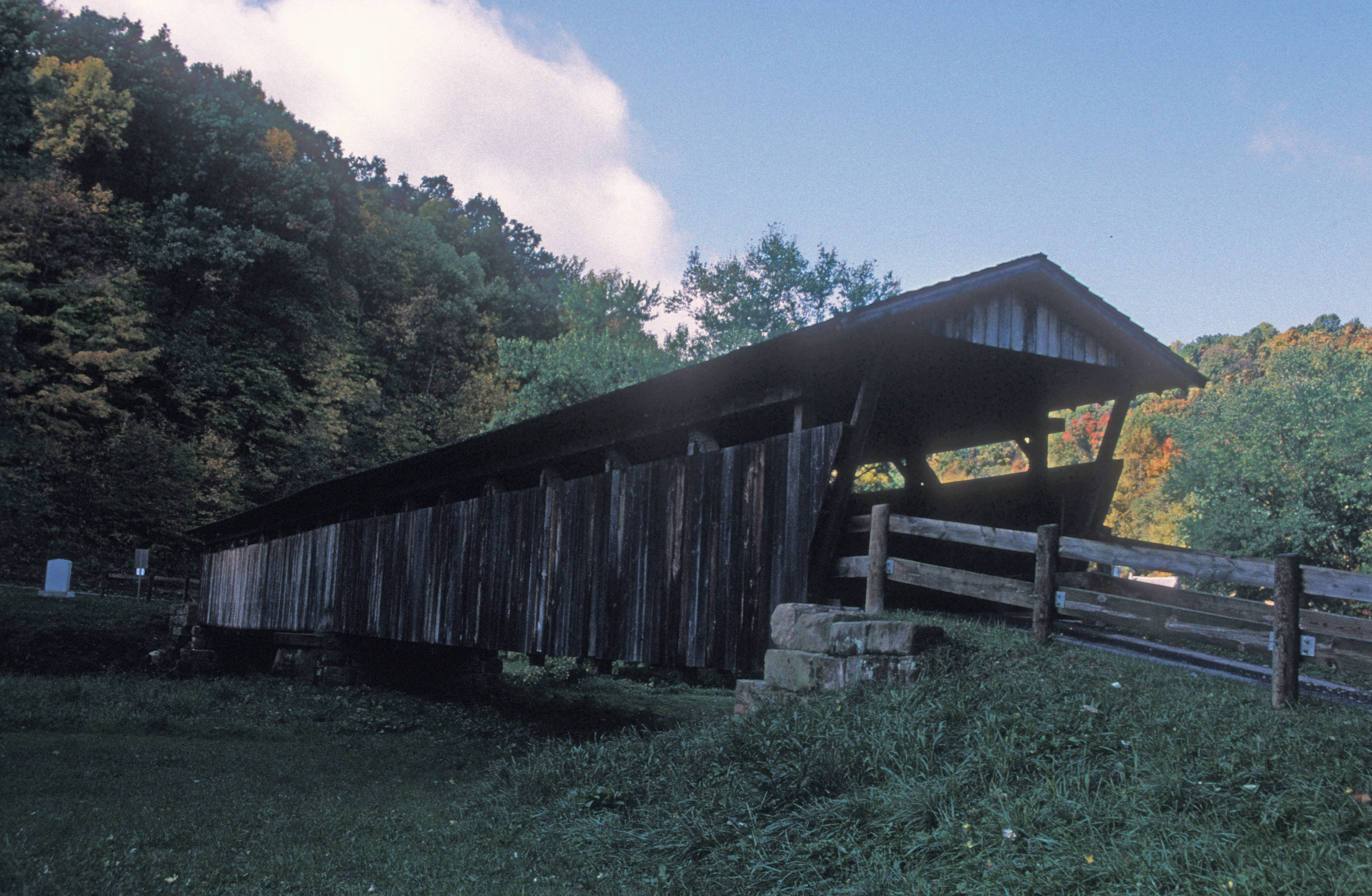
- The Helmick Covered Bridge

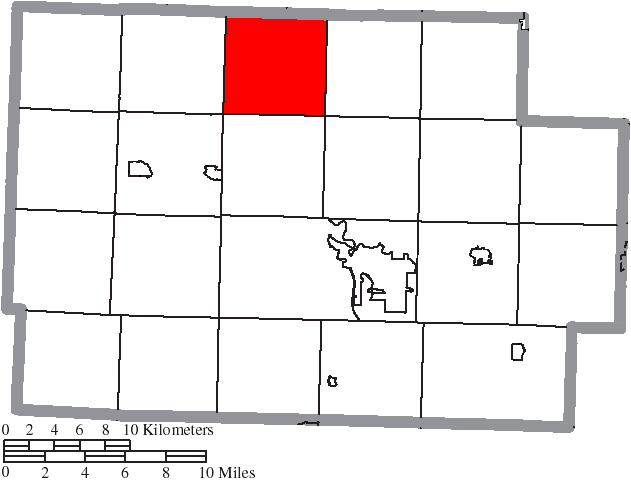
- Location of Clark Township in Coshocton County
- Coordinates: 40°24′47″N 81°56′39″W
- Country: United States
- State: Ohio
- County: Coshocton

Area
  - Total: 25.45 sq mi (65.92 km^{2})
  - Land: 25.44 sq mi (65.88 km^{2})
  - Water: 0.015 sq mi (0.04 km^{2})
- Elevation: 833 ft (254 m)

Population (2020)
  - Total: 670
  - Density: 26/sq mi (10/km^{2})
- Time zone: UTC-5 (Eastern (EST))
  - Summer (DST): UTC-4 (EDT)
- FIPS code: 39-15266
- GNIS feature ID: 1085912

Historical population
Census	Pop.	Note	%±
1990	578		—
2000	594		2.8%
2010	586		−1.3%
2020	670		14.3%
U.S. Census:

Clark Township is one of the twenty-two townships of Coshocton County, Ohio, United States. As of the 2020 census, its population was 670.

== Geography ==
Located in the northern part of the county, it borders the following townships:

- Mechanic Township, Holmes County - northeast
- Mill Creek Township - east
- Keene Township - southeast corner
- Bethlehem Township - south
- Jefferson Township - southwest corner
- Monroe Township - west
- Killbuck Township, Holmes County - northwest

No municipalities are located in Clark Township, although the unincorporated community of Blissfield lies in the southwestern part of the township.

== Name and history ==
Clark Township was organized in 1829. It was named for Samuel Clark, a county commissioner.

Statewide, other Clark Townships are located in Brown, Clinton, and Holmes counties.

== Government ==
The township is governed by a three-member board of trustees, who are elected in November of odd-numbered years to a four-year term beginning on the following January 1. Two are elected in the year after the presidential election and one is elected in the year before it. There is also an elected township fiscal officer, who serves a four-year term beginning on April 1 of the year after the election, which is held in November of the year before the presidential election. Vacancies in the fiscal officership or on the board of trustees are filled by the remaining trustees.
