= Killbuck, Ohio =

- Village
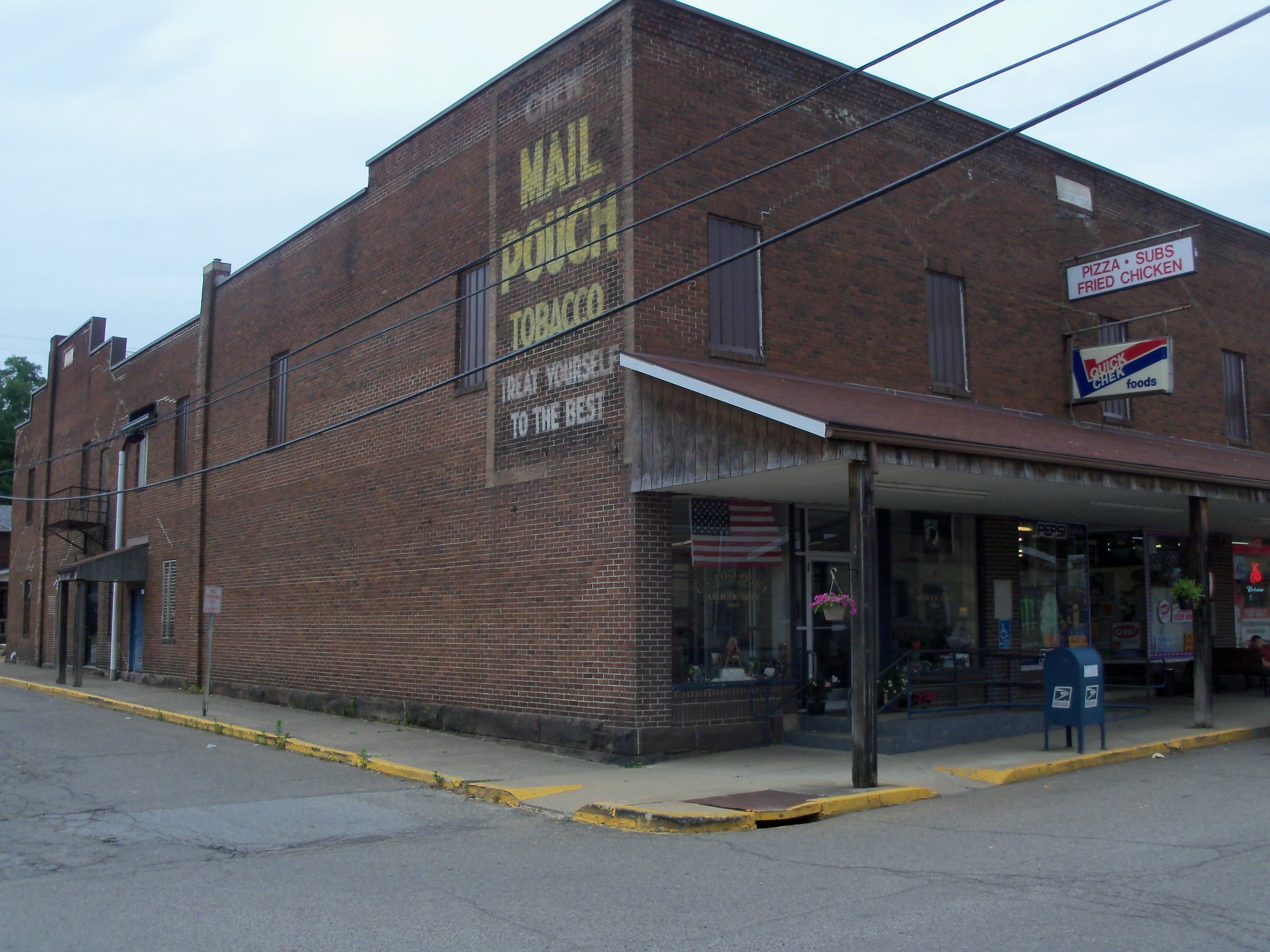
- Killbuck Post Office

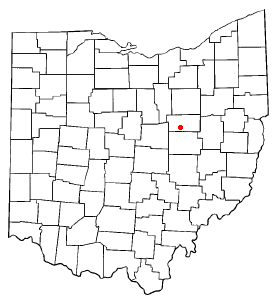
- Location of Killbuck, Ohio

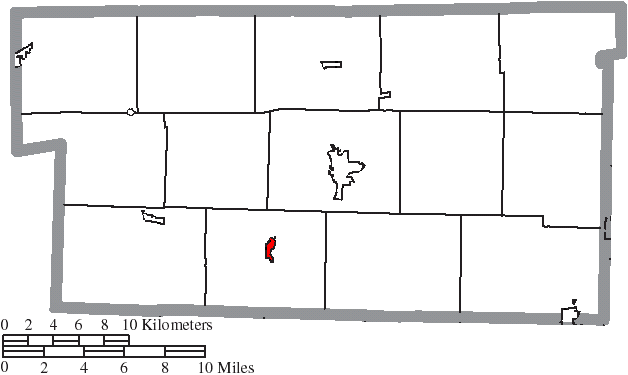
- Location of Killbuck in Holmes County
- Coordinates: 40°29′53″N 81°59′00″W
- Country: United States
- State: Ohio
- County: Holmes
- Township: Killbuck

Area
  - Total: 0.36 sq mi (0.94 km^{2})
  - Land: 0.36 sq mi (0.94 km^{2})
  - Water: 0 sq mi (0.00 km^{2})
- Elevation: 863 ft (263 m)

Population (2020)
  - Total: 810
  - Density: 2,241.8/sq mi (865.55/km^{2})
- Time zone: UTC-5 (Eastern (EST))
  - Summer (DST): UTC-4 (EDT)
- ZIP code: 44637
- Area code: 330
- FIPS code: 39-40180
- GNIS feature ID: 2398346
- Website: https://killbuckvillage.com/

Killbuck is a village in Holmes County, Ohio, United States, along Killbuck Creek. The population was 810 at the 2020 census.

From 2000 to 2002, the Village of Killbuck possessed its own police department. However, in March 2002, the village council voted 5–1 in favor of abolishing the department due to financial struggles. Local law enforcement services are now provided by the Holmes County Sheriff's Office under contract.

== History ==
Killbuck was established in 1874. The village is named for the 18th-century Lenape chief Bemino, also known as John Killbuck Sr.

== Geography ==
According to the United States Census Bureau, the village has a total area of 0.36 square miles (0.93 km^{2}), all land.

== Demographics ==
Historical population
Census	Pop.	Note	%±
1880	262		—
1900	370		—
1910	400		8.1%
1920	575		43.8%
1930	703		22.3%
1940	716		1.8%
1950	767		7.1%
1960	865		12.8%
1970	893		3.2%
1980	937		4.9%
1990	809		−13.7%
2000	839		3.7%
2010	817		−2.6%
2020	810		−0.9%
U.S. Decennial Census

=== 2010 census ===
As of the census of 2010, there were 817 people, 334 households, and 215 families living in the village. The population density was 2,269.4 inhabitants per square mile (876.2/km^{2}). There were 376 housing units at an average density of 1,044.4 per square mile (403.2/km^{2}). The racial makeup of the village was 99.1% White, 0.1% Asian, 0.1% from other races, and 0.6% from two or more races. Hispanic or Latino of any race were 0.5% of the population.

There were 334 households, of which 33.8% had children under the age of 18 living with them, 42.5% were married couples living together, 17.1% had a female householder with no husband present, 4.8% had a male householder with no wife present, and 35.6% were non-families. 31.1% of all households were made up of individuals, and 15% had someone living alone who was 65 years of age or older. The average household size was 2.45 and the average family size was 3.06.

The median age in the village was 38 years. 27.5% of residents were under the age of 18; 6.2% were between the ages of 18 and 24; 25.1% were from 25 to 44; 26.3% were from 45 to 64; and 14.9% were 65 years of age or older. The gender makeup of the village was 44.7% male and 55.3% female.

=== 2000 census ===
As of the census of 2000, there were 839 people, 358 households, and 235 families living in the village. The population density was 2,961.5 inhabitants per square mile (1,143.4/km^{2}). There were 379 housing units at an average density of 1,337.8 per square mile (516.5/km^{2}). The racial makeup of the village was 99.52% White, 0.36% Native American, 0.12% from other races. Hispanic or Latino of any race were 0.60% of the population.

There were 358 households, out of which 28.8% had children under the age of 18 living with them, 48.3% were married couples living together, 13.1% had a female householder with no husband present, and 34.1% were non-families. 28.8% of all households were made up of individuals, and 14.2% had someone living alone who was 65 years of age or older. The average household size was 2.34 and the average family size was 2.86.

In the village, the population was spread out, with 25.4% under the age of 18, 8.7% from 18 to 24, 27.2% from 25 to 44, 21.6% from 45 to 64, and 17.2% who were 65 years of age or older. The median age was 37 years. For every 100 females there were 90.7 males. For every 100 females age 18 and over, there were 86.3 males.

The median income for a household in the village was $30,250, and the median income for a family was $33,594. Males had a median income of $24,420 versus $20,781 for females. The per capita income for the village was $15,510. About 10.6% of families and 12.2% of the population were below the poverty line, including 17.5% of those under age 18 and 4.6% of those age 65 or over.
