= Hardy Township, Holmes County, Ohio =

Township in Ohio, US

- Township
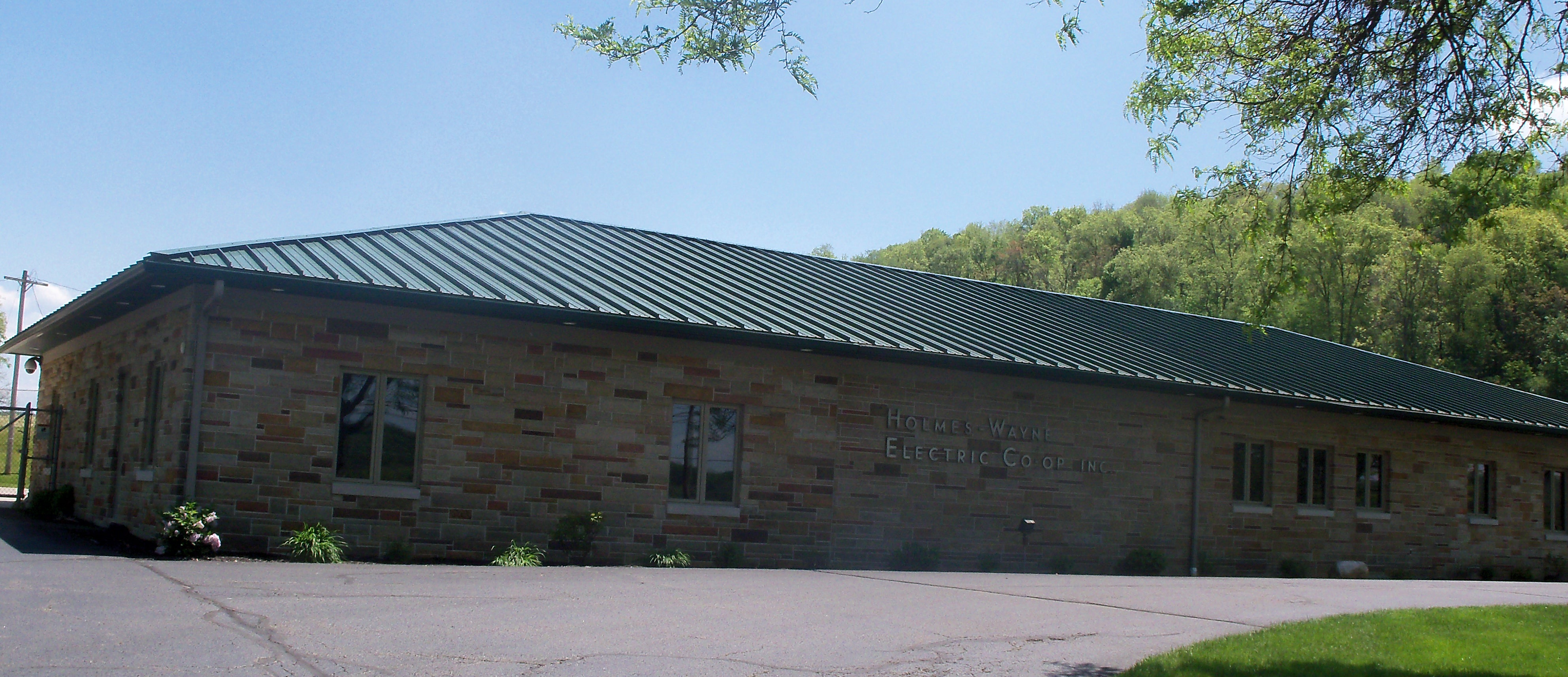
- Holmes-Wayne Electric Cooperative headquarters north of Millersburg

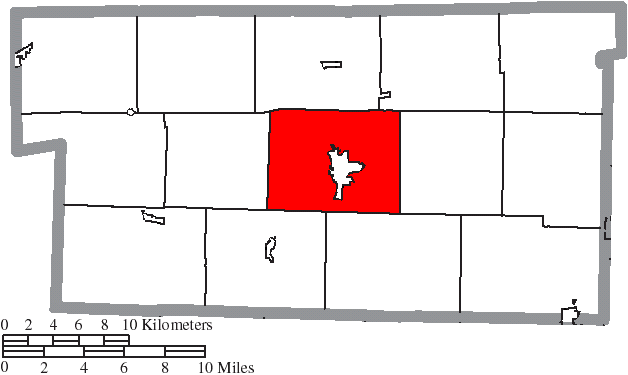
- Location of Hardy Township in Holmes County
- Coordinates: 40°33′29″N 81°55′8″W
- Country: United States
- State: Ohio
- County: Holmes

Area
  - Total: 32.81 sq mi (84.97 km^{2})
  - Land: 32.75 sq mi (84.83 km^{2})
  - Water: 0.054 sq mi (0.14 km^{2})
- Elevation: 794 ft (242 m)

Population (2020)
  - Total: 5,870
  - Density: 179/sq mi (69.2/km^{2})
- Time zone: UTC-5 (Eastern (EST))
  - Summer (DST): UTC-4 (EDT)
- FIPS code: 39-33460
- GNIS feature ID: 1086329
- Website: https://www.hardytownship.com/

Historical population
Census	Pop.	Note	%±
1990	5,261		—
2000	5,643		7.3%
2010	5,649		0.1%
2020	5,870		3.9%
2024 (est.)	6,067		3.4%
U.S. Census:

Hardy Township is one of the fourteen townships of Holmes County, Ohio, United States. As of the 2020 census the population was 5,870.

== Geography ==
Located at the center of the county, it borders the following townships:

- Prairie Township - north
- Salt Creek Township - northeast
- Berlin Township - east
- Mechanic Township - southeast
- Killbuck Township - southwest
- Monroe Township - west

The village of Millersburg, the county seat of Holmes County, is located in central Hardy Township.

== Name and history ==
It is the only Hardy Township statewide.

== Government ==
The township is governed by a three-member board of trustees, who are elected in November of odd-numbered years to a four-year term beginning on the following January 1. Two are elected in the year after the presidential election and one is elected in the year before it. There is also an elected township fiscal officer, who serves a four-year term beginning on April 1 of the year after the election, which is held in November of the year before the presidential election. Vacancies in the fiscal officership or on the board of trustees are filled by the remaining trustees.
