= 1944 United States presidential election in Ohio =

- November 7, 1944

Nominee	Thomas E. Dewey	Franklin D. Roosevelt
Party	Republican	Democratic
Home state	New York	New York
Running mate	John W. Bricker	Harry S. Truman
Electoral vote	25	0
Popular vote	1,582,293	1,570,763
Percentage	50.18%	49.82%
County results
Dewey
50–60%
60–70%
70–80%
Roosevelt
50–60%
60–70%
President before election
Franklin D. Roosevelt
Democratic
Elected President
Franklin D. Roosevelt
Democratic

The 1944 United States presidential election in Ohio was held on November 7, 1944, as part of the 1944 United States presidential election. State voters chose 25 electors to the Electoral College, who voted for president and vice president.

Ohio was narrowly won by Republican Party candidate Thomas E. Dewey with 50.18% of the popular vote; Dewey's running mate was incumbent Ohio Governor John W. Bricker. The Democratic candidate, incumbent President Franklin D. Roosevelt got 49.82% of the popular vote. This is the first of only 2 presidential elections in the 20th century, where Ohio voted for the losing candidate, the only other time was the 1960 election.

== Results ==
1944 United States presidential election in Ohio
Party	Candidate	Votes	Percentage	Electoral votes
Republican	Thomas Edmund Dewey	1,582,293	50.18%	25
Democratic	Franklin D. Roosevelt (incumbent)	1,570,763	49.82%	0
Totals		3,153,056	100.0%	25

=== Results by county ===
County	Thomas Edmund Dewey Republican		Franklin Delano Roosevelt Democratic		Margin		Total votes cast
County	#	%	#	%	#	%	Total votes cast
Adams	5,590	58.30%	3,998	41.70%	1,592	16.60%	9,588
Allen	21,024	62.59%	12,564	37.41%	8,460	25.19%	33,588
Ashland	8,994	59.47%	6,130	40.53%	2,864	18.94%	15,124
Ashtabula	17,181	56.33%	13,319	43.67%	3,862	12.66%	30,500
Athens	10,326	58.13%	7,438	41.87%	2,888	16.26%	17,764
Auglaize	8,980	64.75%	4,888	35.25%	4,092	29.51%	13,868
Belmont	15,485	39.13%	24,093	60.87%	-8,608	-21.75%	39,578
Brown	5,024	51.44%	4,743	48.56%	281	2.88%	9,767
Butler	22,702	45.96%	26,698	54.04%	-3,996	-8.09%	49,400
Carroll	4,898	62.75%	2,907	37.25%	1,991	25.51%	7,805
Champaign	7,795	61.89%	4,800	38.11%	2,995	23.78%	12,595
Clark	22,207	49.83%	22,362	50.17%	-155	-0.35%	44,569
Clermont	9,125	53.48%	7,937	46.52%	1,188	6.96%	17,062
Clinton	7,200	65.98%	3,713	34.02%	3,487	31.95%	10,913
Columbiana	19,976	51.52%	18,796	48.48%	1,180	3.04%	38,772
Coshocton	7,917	56.38%	6,126	43.62%	1,791	12.75%	14,043
Crawford	10,464	59.65%	7,079	40.35%	3,385	19.30%	17,543
Cuyahoga	217,824	39.71%	330,659	60.29%	-112,835	-20.57%	548,483
Darke	11,135	58.08%	8,036	41.92%	3,099	16.17%	19,171
Defiance	7,450	67.21%	3,634	32.79%	3,816	34.43%	11,084
Delaware	9,186	66.78%	4,569	33.22%	4,617	33.57%	13,755
Erie	10,663	57.90%	7,753	42.10%	2,910	15.80%	18,416
Fairfield	11,135	56.89%	8,439	43.11%	2,696	13.77%	19,574
Fayette	5,933	60.06%	3,945	39.94%	1,988	20.13%	9,878
Franklin	99,292	52.62%	89,394	47.38%	9,898	5.25%	188,686
Fulton	8,258	79.37%	2,147	20.63%	6,111	58.73%	10,405
Gallia	6,464	68.53%	2,968	31.47%	3,496	37.07%	9,432
Geauga	5,295	61.86%	3,264	38.14%	2,031	23.73%	8,559
Greene	9,680	54.95%	7,937	45.05%	1,743	9.89%	17,617
Guernsey	8,878	57.69%	6,512	42.31%	2,366	15.37%	15,390
Hamilton	154,960	51.75%	144,470	48.25%	10,490	3.50%	299,430
Hancock	13,450	68.27%	6,252	31.73%	7,198	36.53%	19,702
Hardin	8,566	62.55%	5,128	37.45%	3,438	25.11%	13,694
Harrison	5,194	60.57%	3,381	39.43%	1,813	21.14%	8,575
Henry	7,241	73.54%	2,605	26.46%	4,636	47.09%	9,846
Highland	7,963	59.88%	5,336	40.12%	2,627	19.75%	13,299
Hocking	4,535	54.63%	3,766	45.37%	769	9.26%	8,301
Holmes	3,093	54.69%	2,563	45.31%	530	9.37%	5,656
Huron	11,442	66.06%	5,879	33.94%	5,563	32.12%	17,321
Jackson	6,786	59.26%	4,666	40.74%	2,120	18.51%	11,452
Jefferson	15,496	38.43%	24,827	61.57%	-9,331	-23.14%	40,323
Knox	9,963	64.13%	5,573	35.87%	4,390	28.26%	15,536
Lake	13,697	51.86%	12,713	48.14%	984	3.73%	26,410
Lawrence	9,312	53.90%	7,966	46.10%	1,346	7.79%	17,278
Licking	16,815	56.74%	12,819	43.26%	3,996	13.48%	29,634
Logan	9,882	66.65%	4,944	33.35%	4,938	33.31%	14,826
Lorain	23,866	48.59%	25,254	51.41%	-1,388	-2.83%	49,120
Lucas	77,247	50.37%	76,109	49.63%	1,138	0.74%	153,356
Madison	5,546	62.17%	3,374	37.83%	2,172	24.35%	8,920
Mahoning	35,184	33.42%	70,102	66.58%	-34,918	-33.16%	105,286
Marion	11,925	57.61%	8,775	42.39%	3,150	15.22%	20,700
Medina	10,375	63.35%	6,003	36.65%	4,372	26.69%	16,378
Meigs	6,401	65.32%	3,399	34.68%	3,002	30.63%	9,800
Mercer	7,712	63.04%	4,522	36.96%	3,190	26.07%	12,234
Miami	14,751	58.47%	10,476	41.53%	4,275	16.95%	25,227
Monroe	3,617	50.30%	3,574	49.70%	43	0.60%	7,191
Montgomery	63,336	43.47%	82,367	56.53%	-19,031	-13.06%	145,703
Morgan	4,309	72.13%	1,665	27.87%	2,644	44.26%	5,974
Morrow	5,439	69.78%	2,356	30.22%	3,083	39.55%	7,795
Muskingum	17,577	58.00%	12,729	42.00%	4,848	16.00%	30,306
Noble	4,130	64.89%	2,235	35.11%	1,895	29.77%	6,365
Ottawa	6,922	58.35%	4,941	41.65%	1,981	16.70%	11,863
Paulding	4,515	65.72%	2,355	34.28%	2,160	31.44%	6,870
Perry	7,339	59.24%	5,050	40.76%	2,289	18.48%	12,389
Pickaway	5,997	52.80%	5,362	47.20%	635	5.59%	11,359
Pike	3,117	43.99%	3,968	56.01%	-851	-12.01%	7,085
Portage	12,284	49.50%	12,533	50.50%	-249	-1.00%	24,817
Preble	6,609	57.56%	4,872	42.44%	1,737	15.13%	11,481
Putnam	8,004	71.79%	3,145	28.21%	4,859	43.58%	11,149
Richland	18,065	53.97%	15,406	46.03%	2,659	7.94%	33,471
Ross	11,424	53.50%	9,928	46.50%	1,496	7.01%	21,352
Sandusky	13,763	69.19%	6,129	30.81%	7,634	38.38%	19,892
Scioto	17,489	50.51%	17,134	49.49%	355	1.03%	34,623
Seneca	15,137	70.86%	6,224	29.14%	8,913	41.73%	21,361
Shelby	7,084	55.75%	5,622	44.25%	1,462	11.51%	12,706
Stark	51,506	47.30%	57,393	52.70%	-5,887	-5.41%	108,899
Summit	64,696	41.61%	90,783	58.39%	-26,087	-16.78%	155,479
Trumbull	25,150	42.30%	34,312	57.70%	-9,162	-15.41%	59,462
Tuscarawas	14,357	47.01%	16,184	52.99%	-1,827	-5.98%	30,541
Union	6,908	70.38%	2,907	29.62%	4,001	40.76%	9,815
Van Wert	8,529	62.83%	5,046	37.17%	3,483	25.66%	13,575
Vinton	2,719	59.82%	1,826	40.18%	893	19.65%	4,545
Warren	8,598	59.86%	5,765	40.14%	2,833	19.72%	14,363
Washington	11,676	62.44%	7,023	37.56%	4,653	24.88%	18,699
Wayne	13,616	58.89%	9,506	41.11%	4,110	17.78%	23,122
Williams	8,738	71.89%	3,417	28.11%	5,321	43.78%	12,155
Wood	16,016	66.62%	8,025	33.38%	7,991	33.24%	24,041
Wyandot	6,144	65.54%	3,231	34.46%	2,913	31.07%	9,375
Totals	1,582,293	50.18%	1,570,763	49.82%	11,530	0.37%	3,153,056

==== Counties that flipped from Democratic to Republican ====
- Athens
- Brown
- Columbiana
- Fairfield
- Franklin
- Hocking
- Holmes
- Lawrence
- Licking
- Lucas
- Pickaway
- Richland
- Ross
- Scioto

== See also ==
- United States presidential elections in Ohio
