= Killbuck Creek =

Tributary of the Walhonding River in north-central Ohio

Coordinates: 40.3290°N 81.9393°W

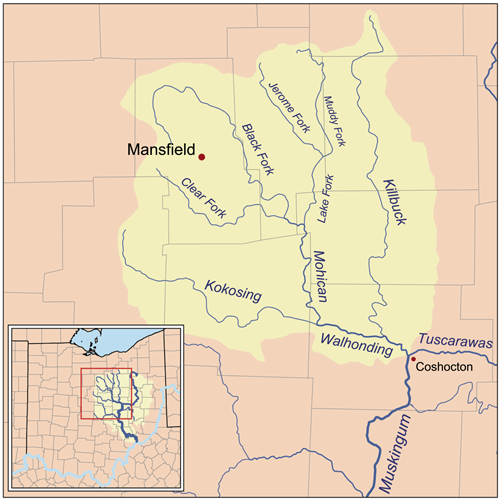
Map of the Walhonding watershed showing Killbuck Creek

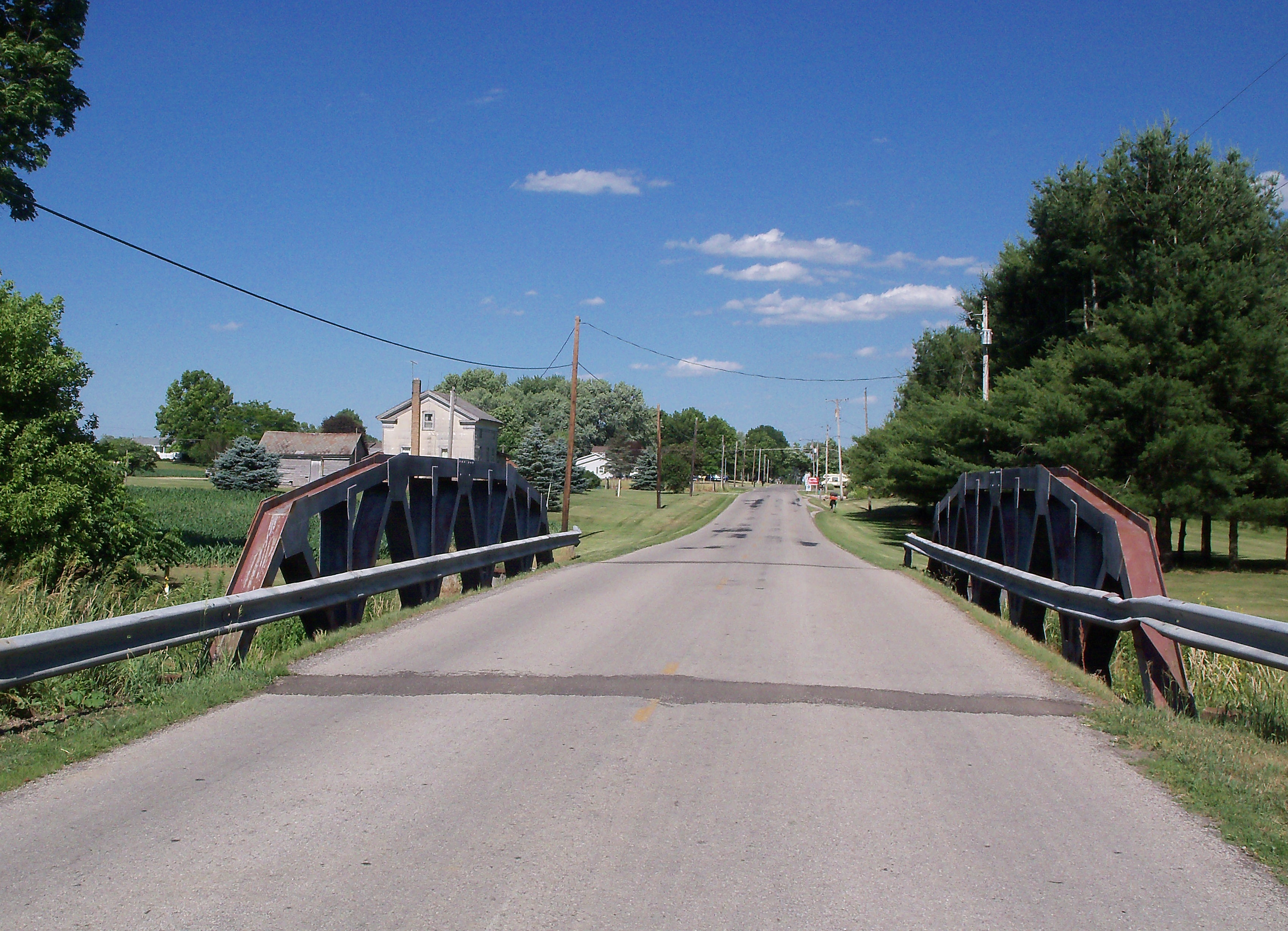
A bridge over the creek near its headwaters west of Creston

Killbuck Creek is a tributary of the Walhonding River, 81.7 mi (131.5 km) long, in north-central Ohio in the United States. Via the Walhonding, Muskingum and Ohio Rivers, it is part of the watershed of the Mississippi River. It drains an area of 613 mi² (1588 km²).

Killbuck Creek rises in northern Wayne County and initially flows in a counter-clockwise loop northward into southern Medina County and past the town of Burbank before turning to a southward course through Wayne, Holmes and Coshocton Counties to its mouth at the Walhonding River, 5 mi (8 km) west of the city of Coshocton. Along its course it flows to the west of the city of Wooster and passes the towns of Holmesville, Millersburg and Killbuck.

A USGS stream gauge on the creek at Layland recorded a mean annual discharge of 502 cubic feet per second (14.2 m^{3}/s) during water years 1924-1930. According to a US Environmental Protection Agency estimate, the mean annual discharge of the creek at its mouth is 625.34 cu ft/s (17.708 m^{3}/s).

== Name ==
Killbuck Creek and the town of Killbuck are named for the Lenape war chief Bemino (fl. 1710s–1780s) — known as John Killbuck, Sr, to the whites. According to the Geographic Names Information System, the stream has been known and spelled variously over the years:

- Kilbuck Creek
- Killbuck Run
- Killbucks Creek
- Kilbuck River
- Kill-Buck River

The United States Board on Geographic Names settled on "Killbuck Creek" as the stream's name in 1963.

== See also ==
- List of rivers of Ohio
