= New Princeton, Ohio =

Unincorporated community in Ohio, U.S.

Coordinates: 40°23′15″N 82°03′41″W

New Princeton is an unincorporated community in Coshocton County, in the U.S. state of Ohio.

== History ==
New Princeton was laid out and platted at an unknown date. A post office called New Princeton was established in 1850, and remained in operation until 1860. New Princeton once contained a wood-fired blast furnace.
