= Ohio State Route 93 =

North-south state highway in Ohio, US

State Route 93
- Route of SR 93 highlighted in red

Route information
- Maintained by ODOT
- Length: 233.83 mi (376.31 km)
- Existed: 1924–present

Major junctions
- South end: Oakley C. Collins Memorial Bridge in Ironton
- US 52 near Ironton; US 35 near Jackson; US 50 in McArthur; US 33 in Logan; US 22 / US 40 / SR 60 in Zanesville; I-70 in Zanesville; US 36 in West Lafayette; US 250 in Beach City; US 62 in Brewster; I-277 / US 224 in Akron
- North end: SR 261 in Akron

Location
- Country: United States
- State: Ohio
- Counties: Lawrence, Jackson, Vinton, Hocking, Perry, Muskingum, Coshocton, Tuscarawas, Holmes, Stark, Summit

Highway system
- Ohio State Highway System; Interstate; US; State; Scenic
← SR 92	→ SR 94
← I-75	→ I-76

State Route 93 (SR 93) is a north–south highway that stretches from Ironton on the Oakley C. Collins Memorial Bridge to State Route 261 in Akron. At a length of 234 miles (377 km), it is the third longest state route in Ohio. The route from Ironton to West Lafayette was once signed as State Route 75. In 1962, to eliminate confusion with an interstate in Ohio having the same number, State Route 75 was replaced by State Route 93 which had previously terminated in West Lafayette.

== Route description ==
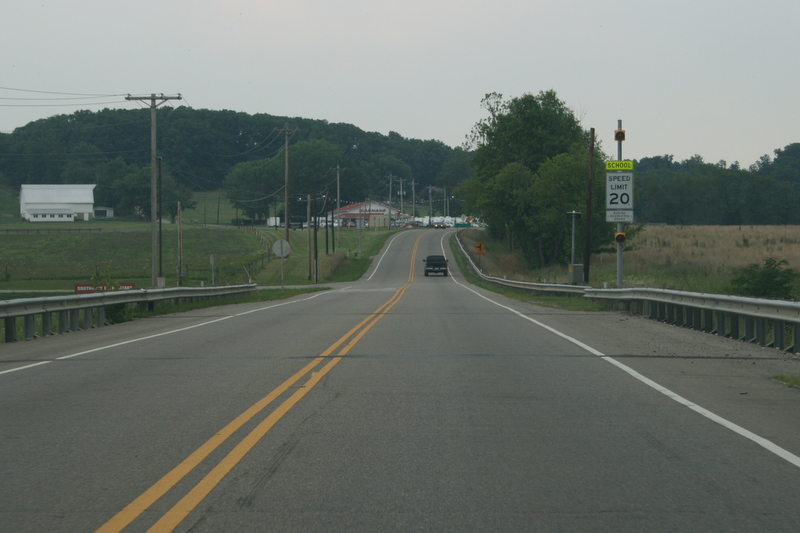
A view of SR 93 while traveling south of Jackson, Ohio toward Oak Hill, Ohio. On the left is Jackson Southview Elementary and the OSU/URG Extension buildings

Since 2017, the southern terminus of SR 93 has been at the Kentucky state line on the Oakley C. Collins Memorial Bridge over the Ohio River. It travels through downtown Ironton on South Second Street and Park Avenue unsigned. After exiting the city limits, it comes to at an interchange with U.S. Route 52 (US 52), the route's former terminus. As of 2018, this interchange is signed as the beginning of SR 93. The route goes through Wayne National Forest and Lake Vesuvius. After leaving Wayne National Forest, the route enters Jackson County and the town of Oak Hill where it intersects with SR 140 and SR 279. The route passes through less hilly areas as it once did in Lawrence County. The route passes through Jackson, and in the village of Coalton, State Route 93 makes a sharp turn eastward to Wellston, where it overlaps SR 327. After Wellston, SR 93 returns on its northerly route to Hamden, McArthur, Logan, New Lexington, Crooksville, and Zanesville. Between Zanesville and Ironton, SR 93 is a busy truck route and used by many travelers as well. Leaving Zanesville, the route is less traveled heading north to Canal Fulton, whence it gradually becomes more and more traveled as it approaches the Portage Lakes region. From this point to its northern terminus, it is a road in which traffic jams are expected during rush hour.

== Major junctions ==
County	Location	mi	km	Destinations	Notes
Greenup	Russell			To US 23 / KY 244	
Ohio River		0.00– 0.58	0.00– 0.93	Oakley C. Collins Memorial Bridge	
Lawrence	Upper Township	1.44– 1.57	2.32– 2.53	US 52 – Chesapeake, Portsmouth	Interchange
Lawrence	Elizabeth Township	11.02	17.73	SR 522 west	Eastern terminus of SR 522
Lawrence	Elizabeth Township	12.93	20.81	SR 373 north	Southern terminus of SR 373
Lawrence	Decatur Township	15.70	25.27	SR 373 south	Northern terminus of SR 373
Jackson	Jefferson Township	29.21	47.01	SR 140 west / CR 65 (Cambria Road) – South Webster, Portsmouth	Eastern terminus of SR 140
Jackson	Oak Hill	32.23	51.87	SR 279 west (Maple Street) – Jackson Lake State Park	Southern end of SR 279 concurrency
Jackson	Oak Hill	32.36	52.08	SR 233 east (Main Street)	Western terminus of SR 233
Jackson	Oak Hill	32.64	52.53	SR 279 east (Madison Street)	Northern end of SR 279 concurrency
Jackson	Lick Township	43.61– 43.72	70.18– 70.36	SR 32 / SR 124 (James A. Rhodes Appalachian Highway) – Athens, Cincinnati	Interchange
Jackson	Jackson	44.75	72.02	SR 139 south (Broadway Street)	Southern end of SR 139 concurrency
Jackson	Jackson	45.00	72.42	SR 139 ends / Bridge Street / Main Street	Northern end of SR 139 concurrency
Jackson	Jackson	45.19	72.73	SR 788 north (Athens Street)	Southern terminus of SR 788
Jackson	Lick Township	46.38– 46.50	74.64– 74.83	US 35 – Gallipolis, Chillicothe	Interchange
Jackson	Coal Township	52.56	84.59	SR 788 south / Levine Road	Northern terminus of SR 788
Jackson	Wellston	53.99	86.89	SR 327 south (Pennsylvania Avenue)	Southern end of SR 327 concurrency
Jackson	Wellston	54.85	88.27	SR 327 north (Broadway)	Northern end of SR 327 concurrency
Jackson	Wellston	55.52	89.35	SR 349 north – Lake Alma State Park	Southern terminus of SR 349
Vinton	Hamden	57.60	92.70	SR 160 east (Wilkesville Avenue)	Western terminus of SR 160
Vinton	Clinton Township	58.13	93.55	SR 683 north – Allensville	Southern terminus of SR 368
Vinton	Clinton Township	61.75	99.38	SR 324 south	Northern terminus of SR 324
Vinton	McArthur	64.48	103.77	US 50 (Main Street)	
Vinton	Elk Township	67.51	108.65	SR 328 north – New Plymouth	Southern terminus of SR 328
Vinton	Swan Township	73.90	118.93	SR 56 – South Bloomingville, Athens	
Hocking	Logan	87.36– 87.41	140.59– 140.67	US 33 – Athens, Lancaster	Interchange
Hocking	Falls Township	92.81	149.36	SR 312 north – Bremen	Southern terminus of SR 312
Hocking	Falls Township	93.38	150.28	SR 668 north – Junction City	Southern terminus of SR 668
Perry	New Straitsville	99.93	160.82	SR 216 south (Main Street) to SR 595	Northern terminus of SR 216
Perry	Shawnee	102.32	164.67	SR 155 east / 2nd Street – Corning	Western terminus of SR 155
Perry	New Lexington	110.99	178.62	SR 13 north / SR 37 west (Main Street)	Southern end of SR 13 / SR 37 concurrency
Perry	Bearfield Township	116.31	187.18	SR 13 south / SR 37 east – McConnelsville, Corning	Northern end of SR 13 / SR 37 concurrency
Perry	Harrison Township	119.85	192.88	SR 669 east – McConnelsville	Southern end of SR 669 concurrency
Perry	Crooksville	122.11	196.52	SR 669 west (Ridge Avenue) – Somerset	Northern end of SR 669 concurrency
Muskingum	Newton Township	130.24	209.60	US 22 west – Lancaster	Southern end of US 22 concurrency
Muskingum	South Zanesville	133.49	214.83	SR 719 east to Clay Street / SR 60 / SR 146 / SR 555	Western terminus of SR 719
Muskingum	Zanesville	135.73	218.44	US 40 west (Main Street)	Southern end of US 40 concurrency
Muskingum	Zanesville	135.92	218.74	SR 60 south / SR 146 east (Ninth Street) / Main Street	Southern end of SR 60 / SR 146 concurrency
Muskingum	Zanesville	135.98	218.84	SR 60 north / SR 146 west (Underwood Street) to Fountain Square / I-70	Northern end of SR 60 / SR 146 concurrency
Muskingum	Washington Township	138.30	222.57	US 22 east / US 40 east – [[, Ohio|]]	Northern end of US 22 / US 40 concurrencies
Muskingum	Washington Township	138.34– 138.46	222.64– 222.83	I-70 – Wheeling, W.Va., Columbus	Exit 157 (I-70)
Muskingum	Adamsville	148.79	239.45	SR 208 west (East Street) / North Street – Dresden	Eastern terminus of SR 208
Muskingum	Monroe Township	156.49	251.85	SR 83 south – New Concord	Southern end of SR 83 concurrency
Muskingum	Monroe Township	156.81	252.36	SR 83 north – Coshocton	Northern end of SR 83 concurrency
Coshocton	Linton Township	160.47	258.25	SR 662 south – Cambridge	Northern terminus of SR 662
Coshocton	Linton Township	163.60	263.29	SR 541 east – Kimbolton	Southern end of SR 541 concurrency
Coshocton	Linton Township	165.71	266.68	SR 541 west – Coshocton	Northern end of SR 541 concurrency
Coshocton	West Lafayette	170.31	274.09	SR 751 north	Southern terminus of SR 751
Coshocton	Lafayette Township	172.07	276.92	US 36 – Coshocton	
Tuscarawas	Baltic	183.51	295.33	SR 651 west (Main Street)	Eastern terminus of SR 651
Holmes	Clark Township	186.24	299.72	SR 643 south to SR 557 – Charm, Farmerstown	Northern terminus of SR 643
Tuscarawas	Sugarcreek	189.43	304.86	SR 39 (Main Street) – New Philadelphia, Millersburg	
Tuscarawas	Wayne Township	195.60	314.79	SR 516 east / Cherry Run Road – Winfield	Western terminus of SR 516
Tuscarawas	Franklin Township	200.51	322.69	US 250 south – Strasburg	Southern end of US 250 concurrency
Tuscarawas	Franklin–Wayne township line	201.67	324.56	US 250 north – Wooster	Northern end of US 250 concurrency
Stark	Beach City	202.47	325.84	SR 212 (Redwood Street)	
Stark	Sugar Creek Township	205.15	330.16	US 62 west – Wilmot	Southern end of US 62 concurrency
Stark	Sugar Creek Township	205.51	330.74	US 62 east – Navarre	Northern end of US 62 concurrency
Stark	Tuscarawas Township	210.47	338.72	SR 241 west – Mount Eaton	Southern end of SR 241 concurrency
Stark	Tuscarawas Township	210.61	338.94	SR 241 east / Barrs Street – Massillon	Northern end of SR 241 concurrency
Stark	Tuscarawas Township	213.50	343.59	SR 172 – Massillon, Wooster	
Stark	Lawrence Township	218.99– 219.10	352.43– 352.61	SR 21 – Massillon, Cleveland	Interchange
Summit	New Franklin	222.79	358.55	SR 236 south (Massillon) / West Comet Road	Northern terminus of SR 236
Summit	New Franklin	227.58	366.25	SR 619 – Barberton, Hartville	
Summit	Akron	230.74– 230.84	371.34– 371.50	I-277 east / US 224 east – Mogadore	Exit 2 (I-277); access to I-277 eastbound / from I-277 westbound
Summit	Akron	231.53	372.61	SR 764 east (West Wilbeth Road)	Western terminus of SR 764
Summit	Akron	231.87– 232.11	373.16– 373.54	Kenmore Boulevard / West Wilbeth Road	Interchange
Summit	Akron	233.83	376.31	SR 261 (Vernon Odom Boulevard) / East Avenue	
1.000 mi = 1.609 km; 1.000 km = 0.621 mi: Concurrency terminus; Incomplete access
