= Ohio State Route 21 =

State highway in northeastern Ohio, US

State Route 21

Route information
- Maintained by ODOT
- Length: 59.81 mi (96.25 km)
- Existed: 1971 (1926 as US Route 21)–present

Major junctions
- South end: US 250 near Strasburg
- US 62 in Navarre; US 30 in Massillon; I-76 / US 224 in Norton; I-77 from Fairlawn to Richfield; I-80 / Ohio Turnpike in Richfield
- North end: I-77 in Cuyahoga Heights

Location
- Country: United States
- State: Ohio
- Counties: Tuscarawas, Stark, Wayne, Summit, Cuyahoga

Highway system
- Ohio State Highway System; Interstate; US; State; Scenic
| ← US 21 | → US 22 |

State Route 21 (SR 21) is a north–south state highway in northeastern Ohio. The southern terminus is north of Strasburg on U.S. Route 250. The northern terminus is at an interchange with Interstate 77 in Cuyahoga Heights.

== Route description ==
The southern terminus of SR 21 is on US 250 in Franklin Township, Tuscarawas County, north of Strasburg and about 3.1 miles (5.0 km) north of I-77 exit 87. At the intersection, westbound US 250, which had been heading north–northwest, turns to the west while its roadway continues as SR 21. The route is an undivided, two-lane road.

SR 21 proceeds through Franklin Township. At the line with Bethlehem Township, Stark County, the route crosses SR 212 (Dolphin Street SW) and takes the name Erie Avenue SW. As the route enters Navarre, it takes on the character of a small-town street, taking the name Main Street, then enters a concurrency with US 62 at Canal Street. As the route continues through Navarre, it begins to pick up turn lanes. In northern Navarre, the route becomes three lanes, adding a center left-turn lane. The route next proceeds north into the city of Massillon, becoming a four lane controlled access highway at an interchange with US 30 and takes Interstate 77 Alternate status from it. SR 21 crosses SR 172 (Lincoln Highway) in downtown Massillon and SR 236 (Lake Street) near the northern city limit. The route continues north crossing SR 93 near Canal Fulton.

SR 21 later crosses into both Summit County and Norton. Just after, there is an interchange with SR 585 and Wooster Road that has an unusual configuration. It is a hybrid combination interchange with a left-hand flyover ramp from eastbound SR 585 to northbound SR 21. Eastbound Wooster Road just west of the interchange crosses the ramp from eastbound SR 585 to southbound SR 21 at-grade and merges with the loop ramp from southbound SR 21 to eastbound Wooster Road. Additionally, Wooster Road leads to Barberton.

SR 21 merges onto I-77 (exit 136) in Copley Township west of Akron, dropping the assignment of Interstate 77 alternate. It remains in a concurrency with the interstate until reaching exit 145 in Richfield, where it departs the interstate. SR 21 next passes under the Ohio Turnpike. It then passes through Brecksville and into Independence, where it crosses Interstate 480 on an overpass immediately east of I-480's interchange with I-77. It next passes briefly through Valley View and into Cuyahoga Heights.

In Cuyahoga Heights, SR 21 reaches its northern terminus at I-77 exit 157.

== History ==
SR 21 follows the route of the old U.S. Route 21, a major north–south highway that connected greater Cleveland, Ohio, to southern South Carolina. South of Strasburg, Ohio, near the current southern terminus of SR 21, the designation of US 21 was moved to the new Interstate 77 freeway in east-central and southeastern Ohio by the early 1970s and then decommissioned. North of Strasburg, what remained of US 21 as a route separate from I-77 became SR 21.

While I-77 directly serves the larger cities of Canton, Akron and Cleveland, SR 21 connects the smaller communities of Massillon and Norton (and indirectly Barberton), and serves some Akron and Cleveland suburbs as a local through route.

Very heavily traveled before the Interstate era, much of SR 21 is divided highway or even freeway.

== Junction list ==
All exits are unnumbered.

| County | Location | mi | km | Destinations | Notes |
|---|---|---|---|---|---|
| Tuscarawas | Franklin Township | 0.00 | 0.00 | US 250 – Strasburg | Southern terminus of SR 21 |
| Tuscarawas–Stark county line | Franklin–Bethlehem township line | 1.47 | 2.37 | SR 212 (Dolphin Street SW) – Beach City, Bolivar | |
| Stark | Navarre | 6.94 | 11.17 | US 62 west (W Canal Street) | Southern end of US 62 concurrency |
| Stark | Perry Township–Massillon line | 9.85 | 15.85 | Southern end of freeway | |
| Stark | Perry Township–Massillon line | 9.85 | 15.85 | US 30 / US 62 east – Canton, Wooster | Northern end of US 62 concurrency |
| Stark | Massillon | 10.45 | 16.82 | Erie Street | |
| Stark | Massillon | 11.39– 11.68 | 18.33– 18.80 | SR 241 (Finefrock Road SW) | |
| Stark | Massillon | 11.39– 11.68 | 18.33– 18.80 | Northern end of freeway | |
| Stark | Massillon | 12.50 | 20.12 | SR 172 (Lincoln Way W) | One-quadrant interchange, via Lillian Gish Boulevard |
| Stark | Massillon | 12.86 | 20.70 | Cherry Road NW | |
| Stark | Massillon | 13.73 | 22.10 | SR 236 (Lake Avenue NW) | |
| Stark | Lawrence Township | 19.93 | 32.07 | SR 93 (Manchester Avenue NW) | |
| Wayne | No major junctions | | | | |
| Summit | Norton | 29.06 | 46.77 | SR 585 (Wooster Road W) | Combination interchange; northern end of SR 585 |
| Summit | Norton | 32.34 | 52.05 | I-76 / US 224 | |
| Summit | Norton | 33.02 | 53.14 | SR 261 (Wadsworth Road) | |
| Summit | Copley Township | 36.55 | 58.82 | SR 162 (Copley Road) | |
| Summit | Copley Township | 38.21 | 61.49 | Southern end of freeway | |
| Summit | Copley Township | 38.21 | 61.49 | I-77 south (Vietnam Veterans Memorial Highway) | Southern end of I-77 concurrency |
For junctions, see Interstate 77 in Ohio
| Summit | Richfield | 48.15 | 77.49 | I-77 north (Vietnam Veterans Memorial Highway) | Northern end of I-77 concurrency |
| Summit | Richfield | 48.15 | 77.49 | Northern end of freeway | |
| Summit | Richfield | 49.06 | 78.95 | I-80 / Ohio Turnpike | |
| Cuyahoga | Brecksville | 52.47 | 84.44 | SR 82 (E Royalton Road) | |
| Cuyahoga | Independence–Valley View line | 59.12 | 95.14 | SR 17 (Granger Road) | |
| Cuyahoga | Cuyahoga Heights | 59.58 | 95.88 | I-77 (Willow Freeway) | Northern terminus of SR 21 |
1.000 mi = 1.609 km; 1.000 km = 0.621 mi: Concurrency terminus
