= Ohio State Route 516 =

State highway in Tuscarawas County, Ohio, US

State Route 516

Route information
- Maintained by ODOT
- Length: 7.70 mi (12.39 km)

Major junctions
- West end: SR 93 / CR 98 in Dundee
- East end: SR 39 in Dover

Location
- Country: United States
- State: Ohio
- Counties: Tuscarawas

Highway system
- Ohio State Highway System; Interstate; US; State; Scenic
| ← SR 515 | → SR 517 |

State Route 516 (SR 516) is a two-lane east-west state highway that runs entirely within Tuscarawas County in eastern Ohio. The western terminus of State Route 516 is at State Route 93 in Dundee. Its eastern terminus is at a signalized intersection with State Route 39 in Dover, just one block west of the Interstate 77/U.S. Route 250 freeway.

Created in the late 1930s, State Route 516 serves primarily rural portions of northwestern Tuscarawas County including Winfield, Ohio.

== History ==
Established in 1937 along the Dundee-to-Dover path that it occupies today, State Route 516 has not seen any major changes to its routing since its designation.

== Major intersections ==
The entire route is in Tuscarawas County.

| Location | mi | km | Destinations | Notes |
|---|---|---|---|---|
| Wayne Township | 0.00 | 0.00 | SR 93 / CR 98 (Cherry Run Road) – Sugarcreek, Beach City | |
| Dover Township | 7.70 | 12.39 | SR 39 – Dover, Sugarcreek | |
1.000 mi = 1.609 km; 1.000 km = 0.621 mi
