= Ohio State Route 643 =

State highway in central Ohio, US

State Route 643

Route information
- Maintained by ODOT
- Length: 16.35 mi (26.31 km)
- Existed: 1937–present

Major junctions
- South end: SR 83 near Coshocton
- North end: SR 93 near Baltic

Location
- Country: United States
- State: Ohio
- Counties: Coshocton, Holmes

Highway system
- Ohio State Highway System; Interstate; US; State; Scenic
← SR 640	→ SR 644

State Route 643 (SR 643, OH 643) is a two-lane north–south state highway in the central portion of Ohio, a U.S. state. The highway's southern terminus is at a T-intersection with State Route 83 north of Coshocton. Its northern terminus is at a T-intersection with the concurrency of State Route 93 north of Baltic. A section of the route is part of a scenic byway.

The route was commissioned in the late 1930s. The northern terminus was relocated to a temporary end with Temporary SR 557, in late 1940s. The highway was paved during the 1950s and 1960s. In the late 1960s the highway's northern terminus was moved to its current location.

== Route description ==
SR 643 begins at a T-intersection with SR 83 in rural Coshocton County. The highway heads northwest, before turning northeast. The road passes through farmland, with some woodlands and houses. The route enters New Bedford and has an intersection with SR 651. The highway leaves New Bedford and continues towards the northwest, before turning easterly. The road makes a sharp curve towards the north. After turning due north, the route has a T-intersection with SR 557. SR 557 heads west and SR 643 heads east from the T-intersection. SR 643 heads east-northeast, before its northern terminus at a T-intersection with SR 93.

The highway between SR 651 and SR 557 is inclusive in the Amish Country Byway, an officially designated National Scenic Byway. The route is not included in the National Highway System. SR 557 has its lowest traffic counts; within the 2011 ODOT survey, the road is listed with an average annual daily traffic (AADT) of 830 vehicles on a section of highway between SR 651 and Holmes County line. ODOT figured that the peak traffic levels were present on the section that is between SR 557 and SR 93, where 1,350 vehicles used the highway daily.

== History ==
SR 643 was commissioned in 1937, on most of the same route as today. The northern terminus of SR 643 was about 0.5 miles (0.80 km) south of the current intersection at SR 93. In 1949, the northern terminus was at Temporary SR 557, when Temporary SR 557 was commissioned. Between 1953 and 1955, SR 557 was paved, in Holmes County. The route in Coshocton County was paved between 1957 and 1961. The Temporary SR 557 was removed by 1969 and SR 643 was extended to the current intersection with SR 557. SR 643 replaced SR 557 from that intersection to SR 93. No significant changes have taken place to this state route since 1969.

== Major intersections ==
County	Location	mi	km	Destinations	Notes
Coshocton	Keene Township	0.00	0.00	SR 83	Southern terminus at T-intersection
Coshocton	New Bedford	10.65	17.14	SR 651 east	Western terminus of SR 651
Holmes	Clark Township	15.02	24.17	SR 557 north	Southern terminus of SR 557
Holmes	Clark Township	16.35	26.31	SR 93	Northern terminus of SR 643
1.000 mi = 1.609 km; 1.000 km = 0.621 mi
