= Winfield, Ohio =

Unincorporated community in Ohio, U.S.

Coordinates: 40.549°N 81.558°W

Winfield is an unincorporated community in Franklin Township, Tuscarawas County, Ohio, United States. It is on State Route 516 between Dover and Dundee.

== History ==
Winfield was originally called Mechanicsburg, and under the latter name was platted in 1849. A post office called Winfield was established in 1850, and remained in operation until 1904.
