= Ohio State Route 651 =

State highway in Ohio, US

State Route 651

Route information
- Maintained by ODOT
- Length: 3.98 mi (6.41 km)
- Existed: 1939–present

Major junctions
- West end: SR 643 / CR 12 in New Bedford
- East end: SR 93 in Baltic

Location
- Country: United States
- State: Ohio
- Counties: Coshocton, Holmes, Tuscarawas

Highway system
- Ohio State Highway System; Interstate; US; State; Scenic
← SR 650	→ SR 652

State Route 651 (SR 651) is a short state highway located in the vicinity of the tripoint of Coshocton, Holmes, and Tuscarawas Counties in Ohio. The route is 3.98 miles (6.41 km) long and is signed east–west. Its western terminus is at SR 643 in the unincorporated community of New Bedford (within Crawford Township) and its eastern terminus is at SR 93 in the village of Baltic.

== Route description ==
SR 651 begins at a four-way stop-controlled intersection with SR 643 and County Road 12 in the center of New Bedford, an unincorporated community. The route heads southeast from the intersection through a mix of light commercial and residential buildings. Upon exiting New Bedford, the route travels in a more easterly direction through farmland with occasional houses. At 2.4 miles (3.9 km) into the route, the route straddles the Coshocton–Holmes County line for about 0.46 miles (0.74 km). The route then dips fully into Holmes County before reentering Coshocton County briefly. It then enters Tuscarawas County and the village of Baltic on Main Street. Main Street and SR 651 descend into the center of Baltic, crossing a Wheeling and Lake Erie railroad, and ending at an intersection with SR 93 (also known as Ray Street). East Main Street continues ahead from this point.

== History ==
SR 651 was first designated in 1939, but was much longer at that time that its present routing. The 1939 route included all of the modern-day SR 651, but the route then headed east and later northeast out of Baltic on Tuscarawas County Road 52 to Ragersville. The route then followed County Road 52 east to what was then US 21 just southwest of New Philadelphia. The route between New Bedford and Baltic was a gravel road at its inception into the state highway system while most of the route between Baltic and New Philadelphia was paved. By 1942, the Baltic-New Philadelphia segment was downgraded to county roads leaving the current New Bedford-Baltic segment the only section of SR 651. No major changes have occurred to the route since then.

== Major intersections ==
County	Location	mi	km	Destinations	Notes
Coshocton	Crawford Township	0.00	0.00	SR 643 / CR 12	
Holmes	No major junctions				
Coshocton	No major junctions				
Tuscarawas	Baltic	3.98	6.41	SR 93 (Ray Street) / East Main Street	
1.000 mi = 1.609 km; 1.000 km = 0.621 mi
