= Ohio State Route 687 =

State highway in Stark County, Ohio, US

State Route 687

Route information
- Maintained by ODOT
- Length: 5.70 mi (9.17 km)
- Existed: 1937–present

Major junctions
- West end: SR 241 near Massillon
- East end: I-77 / US 62 in Canton

Location
- Country: United States
- State: Ohio
- Counties: Stark

Highway system
- Ohio State Highway System; Interstate; US; State; Scenic
← SR 686	→ SR 689

State Route 687 (SR 687) is a 5.70-mile (9.17 km) long east–west state highway in the northeastern portion of the U.S. state of Ohio. Its western terminus is at SR 241 about 4.50 miles (7.24 km) north of Massillon, and its eastern terminus is at the northern junction of I-77 and US 62 approximately 2.50 miles (4.02 km) northwest of downtown Canton.

== Route description ==
SR 687 runs entirely within the northwestern quadrant of Stark County, mostly in Jackson and Plain townships. This highway is not included as a part of the National Highway System (NHS). The NHS is a network of highways identified as being most important for the economy, mobility and defense of the country.

== History ==
SR 687 was created in 1937. The original routing of the highway consisted of Fulton Drive from SR 236 north of Massillon to the present western terminus of SR 687 at SR 241; the entire current length of SR 687 into Canton; and Fulton Drive from the present eastern terminus of the route at I-77/SR 62 southeast into downtown Canton, where it came to an end at SR 172 (designated US 30 until the late 1970s).

By 1995, the westernmost portion of SR 687 between SR 236 and SR 241 was removed from the state highway system. On the eastern end, jurisdiction of the portion of SR 687 between I-77/US 62 and SR 172 in Canton was transferred from the state of Ohio to the city of Canton between 1988 and 1992.

== Major intersections ==
The entire route is in Stark County.

Location	mi	km	Destinations	Notes
Jackson Township	0.00	0.00	SR 241 (Wales Avenue NW) / Fulton Road NW – Massillon, Akron	
Canton	5.70	9.17	I-77 / US 62 (Malone Parkway) / Fulton Road NW – Marietta, Akron, Alliance	Exit 107A (I-77)
1.000 mi = 1.609 km; 1.000 km = 0.621 mi
