= Ohio State Route 650 =

State highway in Lawrence County, Ohio, US

State Route 650

Route information
- Maintained by ODOT
- Length: 9.28 mi (14.93 km)
- Existed: 1955–present

Major junctions
- South end: US 52 in Hanging Rock
- North end: SR 522 near Wheelersburg

Location
- Country: United States
- State: Ohio
- Counties: Lawrence

Highway system
- Ohio State Highway System; Interstate; US; State; Scenic
← SR 647	→ SR 651

State Route 650 (SR 650) is a north–south state highway in the southern portion of Ohio. Its southern terminus is at U.S. Route 52 in Hanging Rock. From this point, the route heads northward to the community of Pine Grove in Wayne National Forest. Its northern terminus is at State Route 522 approximately 9 miles (14 km) southeast of Wheelersburg.

== History ==
State Route 650 made its first appearance in 1955 along the routing that it currently occupies between U.S. Route 52 and State Route 522. The highway has not undergone any significant changes to its routing since its designation.

== Major intersections ==
The entire route is in Lawrence County.

Location	mi	km	Destinations	Notes
Hanging Rock	0.00	0.00	US 52 / US 52 Bus. east (Old Castle Pike) – Ironton, Portsmouth	Interchange; western terminus of US 52 Bus.
Elizabeth Township	9.28	14.93	SR 522	
1.000 mi = 1.609 km; 1.000 km = 0.621 mi
