= Unionville, Holmes County, Ohio =

Unionville, Ohio
- Unincorporated community
- Location within Ohio Location within the United States
- Coordinates: 40°30′02″N 81°43′27″W
- Country: United States
- State: Ohio
- County: Holmes
- Township: Clark
- Elevation: 1,115 ft (340 m)
- Time zone: UTC-5 (Eastern (EST))
  - Summer (DST): UTC-4 (EDT)
- Area codes: 234 & 330
- GNIS feature ID: 1056084

Unionville is an unincorporated community in Holmes County, Ohio, United States. Unionville is 4.4 miles (7.1 km) west of Sugarcreek.
