= Sugar Creek Township, Stark County, Ohio =

Township in Ohio, US

Sugar Creek Township
- Civil township
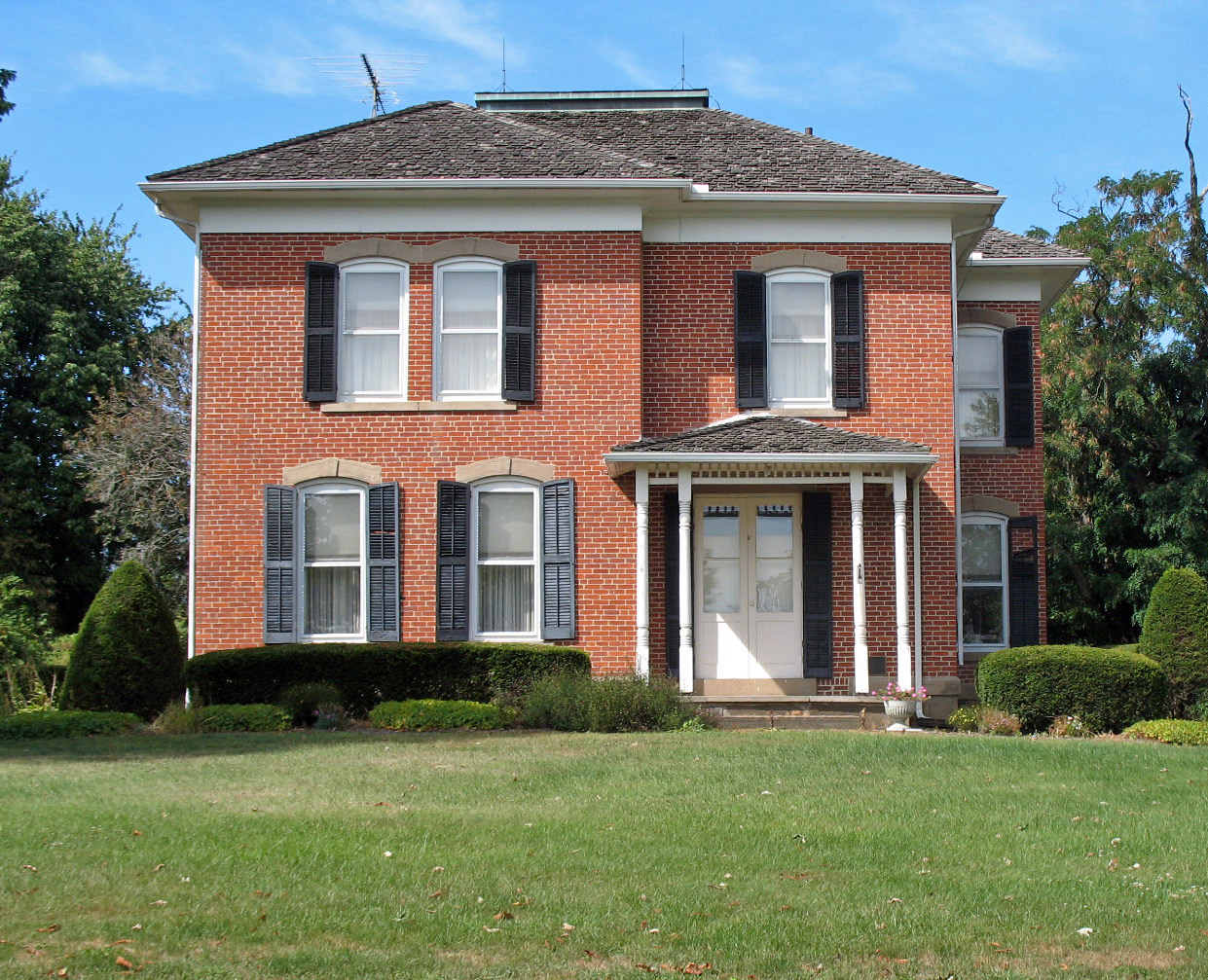
- Emanuel and Frederick Serquet Farmhouse

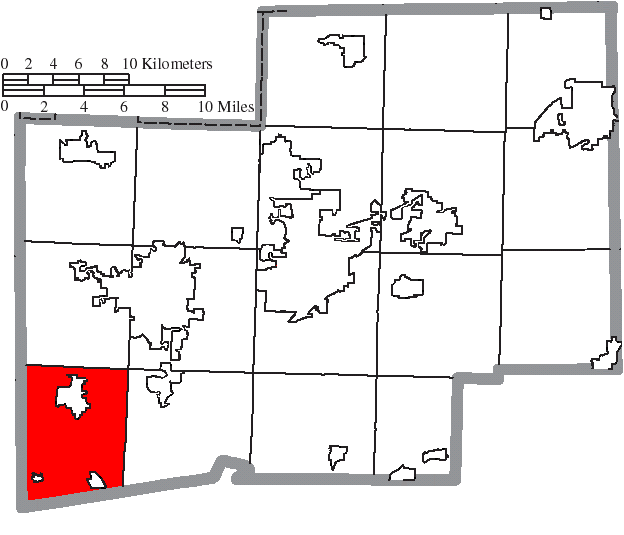
- Location of Sugar Creek Township in Stark County
- Coordinates: 40°41′22″N 81°35′32″W
- Country: United States
- State: Ohio
- County: Stark

Area
  - Total: 33.9 sq mi (87.9 km^{2})
  - Land: 33.9 sq mi (87.7 km^{2})
  - Water: 0.077 sq mi (0.2 km^{2})
- Elevation: 978 ft (298 m)

Population (2020)
  - Total: 6,547
  - Density: 193/sq mi (74.7/km^{2})
- Time zone: UTC-5 (Eastern (EST))
  - Summer (DST): UTC-4 (EDT)
- Zip code: 44662, 44613
- Area code: 330
- FIPS code: 39-75208
- GNIS feature ID: 1086990
- Website: https://sugarcreektwpstark.com/

Sugar Creek Township is one of the seventeen townships of Stark County, Ohio, United States. The 2020 census found 6,547 people in the township.

== Geography ==
Located in the southwestern corner of the county, it borders the following townships:

- Tuscarawas Township - north
- Perry Township - northeast corner
- Bethlehem Township - east
- Franklin Township, Tuscarawas County - southeast
- Wayne Township, Tuscarawas County - south
- Paint Township, Holmes County - southwest
- Paint Township, Wayne County - west
- Sugar Creek Township, Wayne County - northwest

The most southerly township in the county, it is the only township in the county that borders Holmes County.

Three villages are located in Sugar Creek Township:

- Beach City in the southeast
- Brewster in the north
- Wilmot in the southwest

== Name and history ==
Historical population
| Census | Pop. | Note | %± |
|---|---|---|---|
| 1820 | 492 | | — |
| 1830 | 1,263 | | 156.7% |
| 1840 | 1,862 | | 47.4% |
| 1850 | 1,743 | | −6.4% |
| 1860 | 1,800 | | 3.3% |
| 1870 | 1,779 | | −1.2% |
| 1880 | 2,285 | | 28.4% |
| 1890 | 2,782 | | 21.8% |
| 1900 | 2,554 | | −8.2% |
| 1910 | 3,073 | | 20.3% |
| 1920 | 3,821 | | 24.3% |
| 1930 | 4,425 | | 15.8% |
| 1940 | 4,681 | | 5.8% |
| 1950 | 5,056 | | 8.0% |
| 1960 | 5,802 | | 14.8% |
| 1970 | 6,132 | | 5.7% |
| 1990 | 6,489 | | — |
| 2000 | 6,740 | | 3.9% |

Named for its Sugar Creek, it is one of five Sugar Creek Townships statewide.

== Government ==
The township is governed by a three-member board of trustees, who are elected in November of odd-numbered years to a four-year term beginning on the following January 1. Two are elected in the year after the presidential election and one is elected in the year before it. There is also an elected township fiscal officer, who serves a four-year term beginning on April 1 of the year after the election, which is held in November of the year before the presidential election. Vacancies in the fiscal officership or on the board of trustees are filled by the remaining trustees.
