= Ohio State Route 372 =

State highway in Ross County, Ohio, US

State Route 372

Route information
- Maintained by ODOT
- Length: 0.68 mi (1,090 m)
- Existed: 1934–present

Major junctions
- West end: US 23 / SR 104 near Waverly
- East end: Scioto Trail State Forest near Waverly

Location
- Country: United States
- State: Ohio
- Counties: Ross

Highway system
- Ohio State Highway System; Interstate; US; State; Scenic
← SR 371	→ SR 373

State Route 372 (SR 372) is a very short, two-lane east–west state highway in the southern part of the U.S. state of Ohio. The western terminus of this spur route is at a T-intersection with the concurrency of U.S. Route 23 (US 23) and SR 104 about six and a half miles (10.5 km) north of Waverly. Its eastern terminus is just 0.68 miles (1.09 km) to the east of that point at the boundary of Scioto Trail State Forest. Continuing east of that point is Stoney Creek Road, which traverses through the state forest in the direction of the Scioto River. From its inception in the middle of the 1930s, the primary function of SR 372 has been to provide access to the state forest from the state highway system.

== Route description ==
The entirety of SR 372 is located within Franklin Township in rural southern Ross County. Beginning at a T-intersection with the US 23/SR 104 concurrency, SR 372 travels easterly into a series of curves in the shape of an "S", taking the route to the north and then bending to the southeast. As it passes amidst heavily wooded terrain with some houses alongside the roadway, SR 372 travels past an intersection with North Ridge Road, then abruptly comes to an end as it crosses the western boundary of Scioto Trail State Forest. The roadway continues eastward from this point as Stoney Creek Road.

The Ohio Department of Transportation (ODOT) regularly does surveys to determine the amount of traffic that utilizes its highway system. Commonly, the volumes measured in these surveys are expressed in terms average annual daily traffic (AADT), or the amount of traffic volume on a given segment of a highway on any average day of the year. In 2010, ODOT determined that an average of 340 passenger vehicles per day and 20 commercial vehicles per day used SR 372. This state route is not a part of the National Highway System, a network of roadways identified as being most important for the economy, mobility and defense of the nation.

== History ==
The SR 372 designation was established in 1934. Throughout its entire history, the highway has served to provide a connection to Scioto Trail State Forest from US 23. When it was first designated, all of SR 372 was gravel–surfaced. The state route was paved by 1958.

== Major intersections ==
The entire route is in Franklin Township, Ross County.

mi	km	Destinations	Notes
0.00	0.00	US 23 / SR 104	Western terminus at T-intersection
0.68	1.09	Scioto Trail State Forest	Eastern terminus at state forest boundary
1.000 mi = 1.609 km; 1.000 km = 0.621 mi
