= Ohio State Route 557 =

State highway in Holmes County, Ohio, US

State Route 557

Route information
- Maintained by ODOT
- Length: 10.23 mi (16.46 km)
- Existed: 1937–present

Major junctions
- South end: SR 643 near Baltic
- North end: US 62 / SR 39 near Berlin

Location
- Country: United States
- State: Ohio
- Counties: Holmes

Highway system
- Ohio State Highway System; Interstate; US; State; Scenic
← SR 556	→ SR 558

State Route 557 (SR 557, OH 557) is a two-lane north–south state highway in the central portion of Ohio, a U.S. state. The highway's southern terminus is at a T-intersection with State Route 643 approximately 2 miles (3.2 km) north of Baltic. Its northern terminus is at a T-intersection with the concurrency of U.S. Route 62 and State Route 39 nearly 1.5 miles (2.4 km) west of the unincorporated community of Berlin.

Established in 1937, SR 557 runs exclusively within Holmes County. The highway had a temporary designation from the late 1940s to the early 1960s. The entire road was paved in 1950. The entire route is part of a scenic byway.

== Route description ==
SR 557 begins at a T-intersection with SR 643, with SR 643 making the south and east legs and SR 557 making the west leg. The highway heads west as a two-lane highway, passing through farmland. The route turns northwest heading towards Farmerstown. In Farmerstown the road makes a sharp curve turning towards the southwest, before curving northwest again. The highway passes through Charm, before turning due west. After turning due west, the route turns northwest, before turning due north. SR 557 ends at a T-intersection with US 62 and SR 39.

All of the highway is inclusive in the Amish Country Byway, an officially designated National Scenic Byway. The route is not included in the National Highway System. SR 557 has its lowest traffic counts; within the 2013 ODOT survey, the road is listed with an average annual daily traffic(AADT) of 920 vehicles on a section of highway between the southern terminus and Holmes County Road 600 (CR 600). ODOT figured that the peak traffic levels were present on the section that is between CR 600 and Township Road 154 (T–154), where 3,360 vehicles used the highway daily.

== History ==
SR 557 was commissioned in 1937, on most of the same route as today. The southern terminus of SR 557 was at SR 93. In 1949 a Temporary SR 557 was commissioned between Baltic and the current southern terminus of SR 557. In 1951, the current section of SR 557 was paved. The Temporary SR 557 was removed by 1969 and SR 643 was extended to the current intersection with SR 557. SR 643 replace SR 557 from that intersection to SR 93. No significant changes have taken place to this state route since 1969.

== Major intersections ==
The entire route is in Holmes County.

Location	mi	km	Destinations	Notes
Clark Township	0.00	0.00	SR 643	Southern terminus at T-intersection
Berlin Township	10.23	16.46	US 62 / SR 39	Northern terminus at T-intersection
1.000 mi = 1.609 km; 1.000 km = 0.621 mi
