= Ohio State Route 788 =

State highway in Jackson County, Ohio, US

State Route 788

Route information
- Maintained by ODOT
- Length: 6.27 mi (10.09 km)
- Existed: 1939–present

Major junctions
- South end: SR 93 in Jackson
- North end: SR 93 near Wellston

Location
- Country: United States
- State: Ohio
- Counties: Jackson

Highway system
- Ohio State Highway System; Interstate; US; State; Scenic
← SR 785	→ SR 790

State Route 788 (SR 788) is a north–south state highway in the southern portion of the U.S. state of Ohio. The western terminus is at State Route 93 in Jackson. Its eastern terminus is also at State Route 93, this time less than 2 miles (3.2 km) west of Wellston.

Created in the late 1930s, State Route 788 acts as a shortcut to avoid communities that State Route 93 passes through between Jackson and Wellston.

== Route description ==
Located entirely in the northern portion of Jackson County, State Route 788 is a route that is not included as a part of the National Highway System, a system of highways that are considered most important for the nation's economy, mobility and defence. A resurfacing project on SR 788 began in June 2025 with expected completion in Fall 2025, including lane maintenance during the work.

== History ==
State Route 788 was established in 1939. Originally, the route ran from its intersection with Fairgreens Road northeast of Jackson to its current northern terminus at what was then known as State Route 75 (now State Route 93) west of Wellston. At the time, the current State Route 788 southwest of Fairgreens Road, and Fairgreens Road heading east from State Route 788, was a part of State Route 124. In 1971, with the completion of a new four-lane expressway around the southeastern portion of Jackson, State Route 124 was re-routed onto this new expressway. Consequently, State Route 788 was extended in that year along the portion of former State Route 124 from the Fairgreens Road intersection southwesterly to State Route 788's current southern terminus at State Route 93 in Jackson. A bridge replacement project is proposed on SR 788 between US 35 and Crossin Street in Jackson County to address structural needs and improve safety as part of Ohio Department of Transportation's infrastructure improvements.

== Major intersections ==
The entire route is in Jackson County.

Location	mi	km	Destinations	Notes
Jackson	0.00	0.00	SR 93	
Coal Township	6.27	10.09	SR 93	
1.000 mi = 1.609 km; 1.000 km = 0.621 mi
