= Ohio State Route 241 =

State highway in northeastern Ohio, US

State Route 241

Route information
- Maintained by ODOT
- Length: 50.43 mi (81.16 km)
- Existed: 1928–present

Major junctions
- South end: US 62 / SR 39 in Millersburg
- US 250 in Mount Eaton; SR 93 near Massillon; US 30 near Massillon; I-77 in Green; US 224 in Akron; I-76 in Akron
- North end: SR 18 in Akron

Location
- Country: United States
- State: Ohio
- Counties: Holmes, Wayne, Stark, Summit

Highway system
- Ohio State Highway System; Interstate; US; State; Scenic
← SR 240	→ SR 242

State Route 241 (SR 241) is a north–south state highway in the northeastern portion of the U.S. state of Ohio. Its southern terminus is at U.S. Route 62 in Millersburg, and its northern terminus is at State Route 18 in Akron.

== History ==
SR 241 was commissioned in 1924, between Massillon and Akron. The route was extended south to Millersburg in 1937. In 2009 the northern terminus was changed from Massillon Road to Seiberling Street and Innovation Way in Akron.

== Major intersections ==
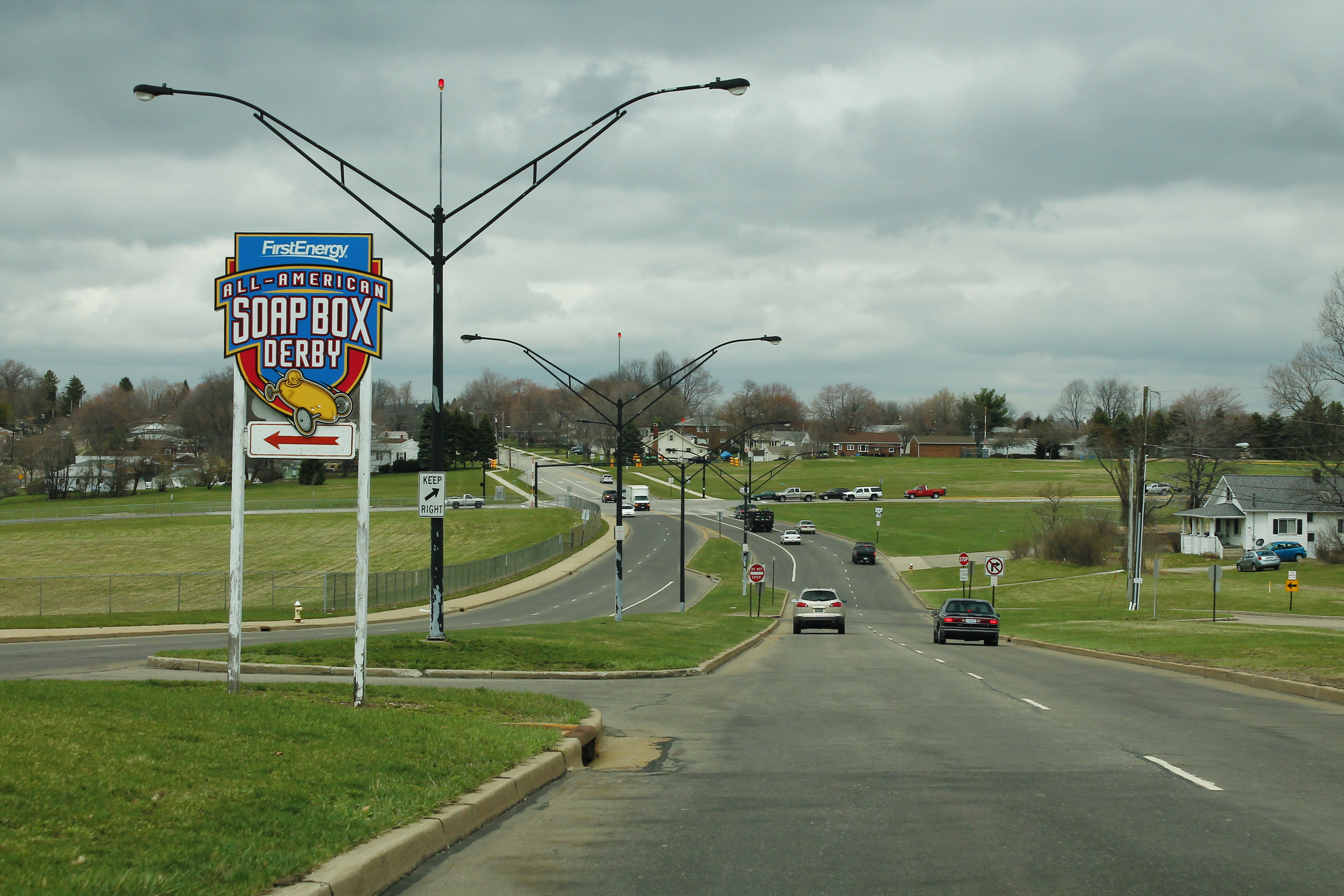
State Route 241 in Akron

County	Location	mi	km	Destinations	Notes
Holmes	Millersburg	0.00	0.00	US 62 / SR 39	
Wayne	Mount Eaton	16.10	25.91	US 250 west / SR 94 north	Western end of US 250 concurrency; southern terminus of SR 94
Wayne	Mount Eaton	16.23	26.12	US 250 east	Eastern end of US 250 concurrency
Stark	Tuscarawas Township	24.02	38.66	SR 93 south	Western end of SR 93 concurrency
Stark	Tuscarawas Township	24.16	38.88	SR 93 north	Eastern end of SR 93 concurrency
Stark	Tuscarawas Township	24.74	39.82	US 30	
Stark	Massillon	28.33– 28.69	45.59– 46.17	SR 21	
Stark	Massillon	29.48	47.44	SR 172 west	Western end of SR 172 concurrency
Stark	Massillon	30.23	48.65	SR 172 east	Eastern end of SR 172 concurrency
Stark	Jackson Township	34.79	55.99	SR 687 east	Western terminus of SR 687
Summit	Green	42.31	68.09	I-77	
Summit	Green	43.02	69.23	SR 619	
Summit	Akron	46.76	75.25	US 224	
Summit	Akron	48.83	78.58	SR 764 west	Eastern terminus of SR 764
Summit	Akron	50.30	80.95	I-76	
Summit	Akron	50.43	81.16	SR 18	
1.000 mi = 1.609 km; 1.000 km = 0.621 mi: Concurrency terminus
