= Dundee, Ohio =

- CDP
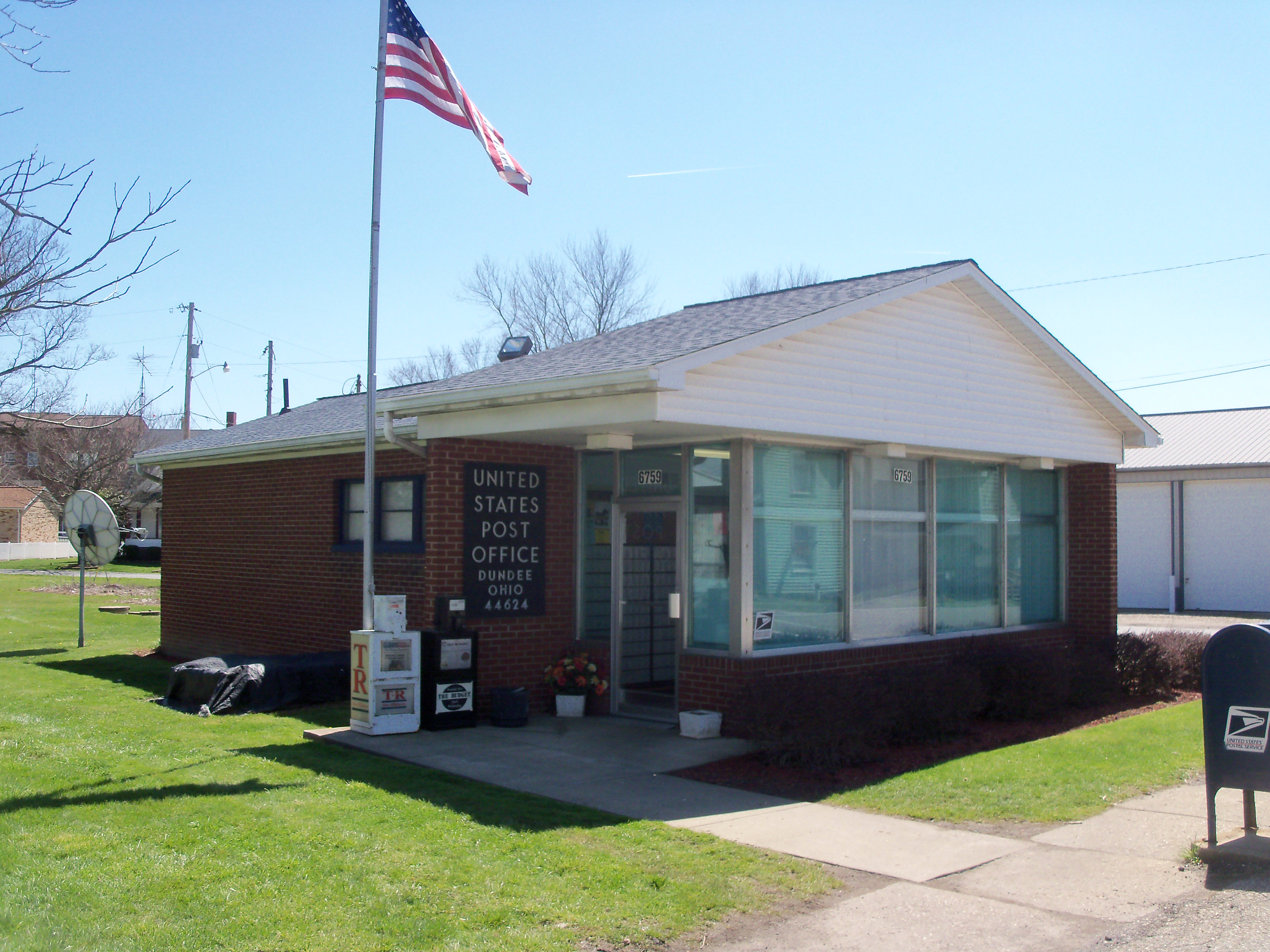
- Dundee Post Office

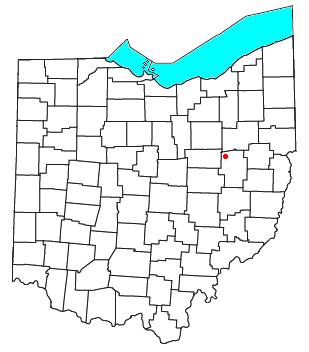
- Location of Dundee, Ohio
- Coordinates: 40°35′13″N 81°36′25″W
- Country: United States
- State: Ohio
- County: Tuscarawas
- Township: Wayne
- Elevation: 1,027 ft (313 m)

Population (2020)
  - Total: 269
- Time zone: UTC-5 (Eastern (EST))
  - Summer (DST): UTC-4 (EDT)
- ZIP code: 44624
- GNIS feature ID: 2628886

Dundee is a census-designated place in central Wayne Township, Tuscarawas County, Ohio, United States. It has a post office with the ZIP code 44624. It lies at the intersection of State Routes 93 and 516. The population was 269 at the 2020 census.

== History ==
Dundee was laid out and platted in 1847. A post office called Dundee has been in operation since 1847.
