= Ohio State Route 373 =

State highway in Lawrence County, Ohio, US

State Route 373

Route information
- Maintained by ODOT
- Length: 3.39 mi (5.46 km)
- Existed: 1934–present

Major junctions
- South end: SR 93 near Ironton
- North end: SR 93 near Ironton

Location
- Country: United States
- State: Ohio
- Counties: Lawrence

Highway system
- Ohio State Highway System; Interstate; US; State; Scenic
← SR 372	→ SR 374

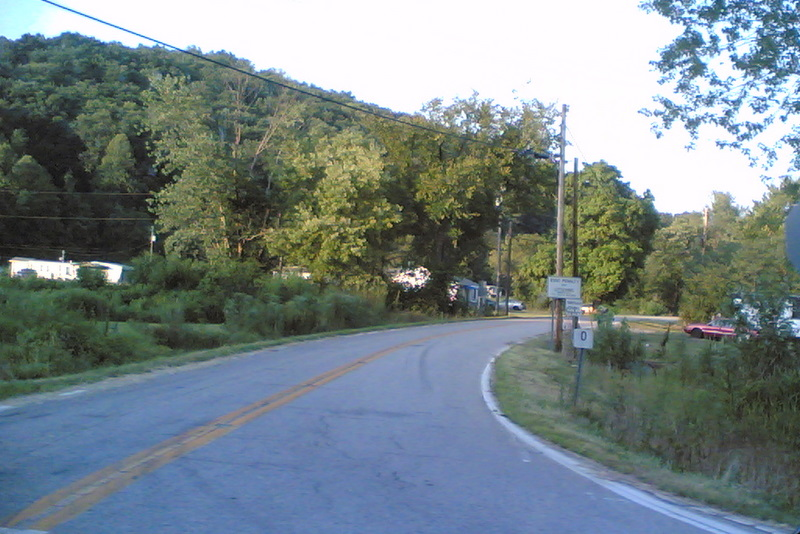
A view of the southern terminus of SR 373 on SR 93 near Bartles (north of Pedro)

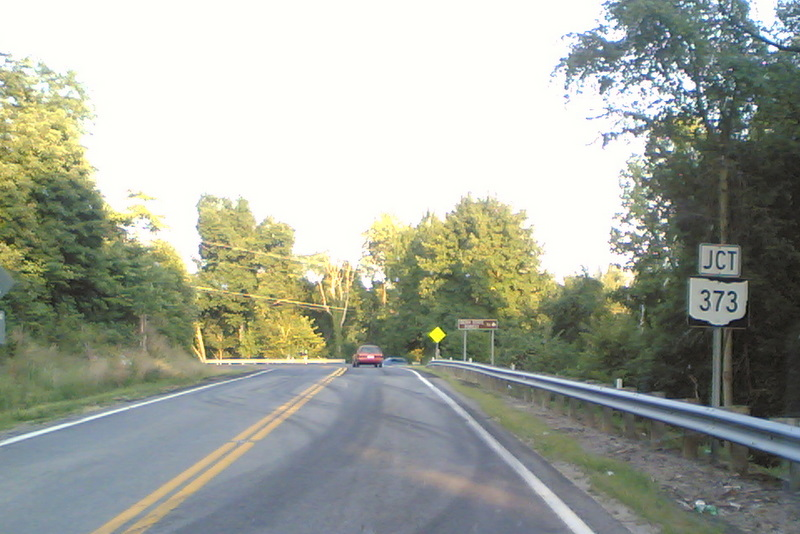
A view of SR 93 near the northern terminus of SR 373 (near Dean State Forest)

State Route 373 (SR 373) is north–south state highway in the southern portion of Ohio. Its southern terminus is just over eleven miles (18 km) north of Ironton at SR 93 at the hamlet of Bartles, and its northern terminus is at about three miles (4.8 km) to the north of its southern terminus, also at SR 93.

The highway was designated in the mid-1930s at about the same time a number of similarly numbered highways, SR 370, SR 371 and SR 372, were created. All of these routes share a common bond in that they were established specifically to serve state parks and state forests. However, unlike the other three routes, which are all spurs, SR 373 is a loop route that intersects SR 93 at both endpoints, while providing access to Dean State Forest. Through the entirety of its route, SR 373 also passes through Wayne National Forest.

== Route description ==
SR 373 runs exclusively within Lawrence County. This state route is not a part of the National Highway System.

The route begins at the intersection of SR 93 and Puckett Cemetery Road in Lawrence County's Elizabeth Township. Traveling through the Wayne National Forest, the bulk of the state highway's surrounding landscape is primarily wooded. As the it departs the southern SR 93 intersection in a generally northeasterly direction, SR 373 is lined by a number of houses. As the highway bends to the east, a vastness of trees appear roadside, on both sides of the route. Turning to the north, SR 373 passes the Dean State Fire Road intersection, then, upon entering Decatur Township, also enters the Dean State Forest proper.

The highway next curves to the northwest, and enters into an inverted U-curve, where it bends to the northeast, then, as it meets Dean Forest Road, bends to the west. SR 373 passes a couple of homes in the final stretch before it arrives at its endpoint, a T-intersection with SR 93 approximately three miles (4.8 km) north of the highway's starting point.

== History ==
SR 373 was established in 1934 along the loop routing off of SR 93 (originally SR 75) that it occupies today. No changes of major significance have taken place to the routing of the road since its designation.

== Major intersections ==
The entire route is in Lawrence County.

Location	mi	km	Destinations	Notes
Elizabeth Township	0.00	0.00	SR 93 – Ironton	Southern terminus
Decatur Township	3.39	5.46	SR 93 – Oak Hill	Northern terminus
1.000 mi = 1.609 km; 1.000 km = 0.621 mi
