= Sugar Creek Township, Ohio =

Sugar Creek Township, Ohio may refer to:

- Sugar Creek Township, Allen County, Ohio
- Sugar Creek Township, Putnam County, Ohio
- Sugar Creek Township, Stark County, Ohio
- Sugar Creek Township, Tuscarawas County, Ohio
- Sugar Creek Township, Wayne County, Ohio

Note, there is also a single word version of Sugar Creek:

- Sugarcreek Township, Greene County, Ohio
