= Ohio State Route 764 =

State highway in Summit County, Ohio, US

State Route 764

Route information
- Maintained by ODOT
- Length: 4.14 mi (6.66 km)
- Existed: 1946–present

Major junctions
- West end: SR 93 in Akron
- I-77 in Akron
- East end: SR 241 in Akron

Location
- Country: United States
- State: Ohio
- Counties: Summit

Highway system
- Ohio State Highway System; Interstate; US; State; Scenic
← SR 763	→ SR 767

State Route 764 (SR 764) is an east–west state highway in the northeastern portion of the U.S. state of Ohio. Existing entirely within the city of Akron, SR 764 has its western terminus at a signalized intersection with SR 93. Its eastern terminus is also at a signalized intersection, this time with SR 241. The highway serves Akron Fulton International Airport and the Rubber Bowl.

== Route description ==
All of SR 764 exists within the city limits of Akron in Summit County. There is no portion of SR 764 that is included as a component of the National Highway System, a network of highways identified as being most important for the economy, mobility and defense of the nation.

== History ==
SR 764 was designated in 1946. Its original routing followed the entirety of its existing alignment, along with the short portion of SR 241 that follows Triplett Boulevard on the north side of Akron-Fulton International Airport between Seiberling Street and Massillon Road.

In 2009, SR 241 was re-routed north of SR 764 off of Massillon Road, and onto Seiberling Street approximately four blocks to the west. Consequently, SR 241 was routed over the former easternmost four blocks of SR 764 to connect to the north–south segment of SR 241. SR 764 was thus shortened as its new eastern terminus was moved to its new junction with SR 241 at the intersection of Triplett Boulevard and Seiberling Street.

== Major intersections ==
The entire route is in Akron, Summit County.

mi	km	Destinations	Notes
0.00	0.00	SR 93 (Manchester Road) / Wilbeth Road	
2.16	3.48	I-77 / Coventry Street / Allendale Avenue – Canton, Cleveland	Exit 123B (I-77)
4.14	6.66	SR 241 (Triplett Boulevard / South Sieberling Street) / Glaser Parkway	
1.000 mi = 1.609 km; 1.000 km = 0.621 mi
