= Ohio State Route 522 =

State highway in southern Ohio, US

State Route 522

Route information
- Maintained by ODOT
- Length: 16.60 mi (26.72 km)
- Existed: 1947–present

Major junctions
- West end: US 52 near Wheelersburg
- East end: SR 93 near Ironton

Location
- Country: United States
- State: Ohio
- Counties: Scioto, Lawrence

Highway system
- Ohio State Highway System; Interstate; US; State; Scenic
← SR 521	→ SR 523

State Route 522 (SR 522) is an east–west state highway in the southern portion of the U.S. state of Ohio. State Route 522 has its western terminus is at a diamond interchange with U.S. Route 52 less than 3 miles (4.8 km) south of Wheelersburg. Its eastern terminus is at a T-intersection with State Route 93 just over 9 miles (14 km) north of Ironton.

== Route description ==
State Route 522's path takes it through portions of Scioto and Lawrence Counties. No segment of this highway is included within the National Highway System, a network of highways deemed most important for the economy, mobility and defense of the country.

== History ==
State Route 522 was designated in 1947. The original routing of the state route followed the majority of today's routing, running from its junction with what was then a two-lane alignment of U.S. Route 52 (now known as Gallia Street) on the southern fringe of Wheelersburg to its present eastern terminus at what was then known as State Route 75 (now State Route 93). In 1971, with the completion of a new four-lane expressway through the Wheelersburg vicinity, U.S. Route 52 was routed onto this expressway. State Route 522, in turn, was extended southerly along the former two-lane alignment of U.S. Route 52 to its present-day western terminus where this roadway meets the U.S. Route 52 expressway at a diamond interchange.

== Major intersections ==
County	Location	mi	km	Destinations	Notes
Scioto	Porter Township	0.00	0.00	US 52 / Hayport Road	Interchange
Lawrence	Elizabeth Township	9.40	15.13	SR 650 south	Northern terminus of SR 650
Lawrence	Elizabeth Township	16.60	26.72	SR 93	
1.000 mi = 1.609 km; 1.000 km = 0.621 mi
