= Sugar Creek Township, Tuscarawas County, Ohio =

Township in Ohio, US

- Township
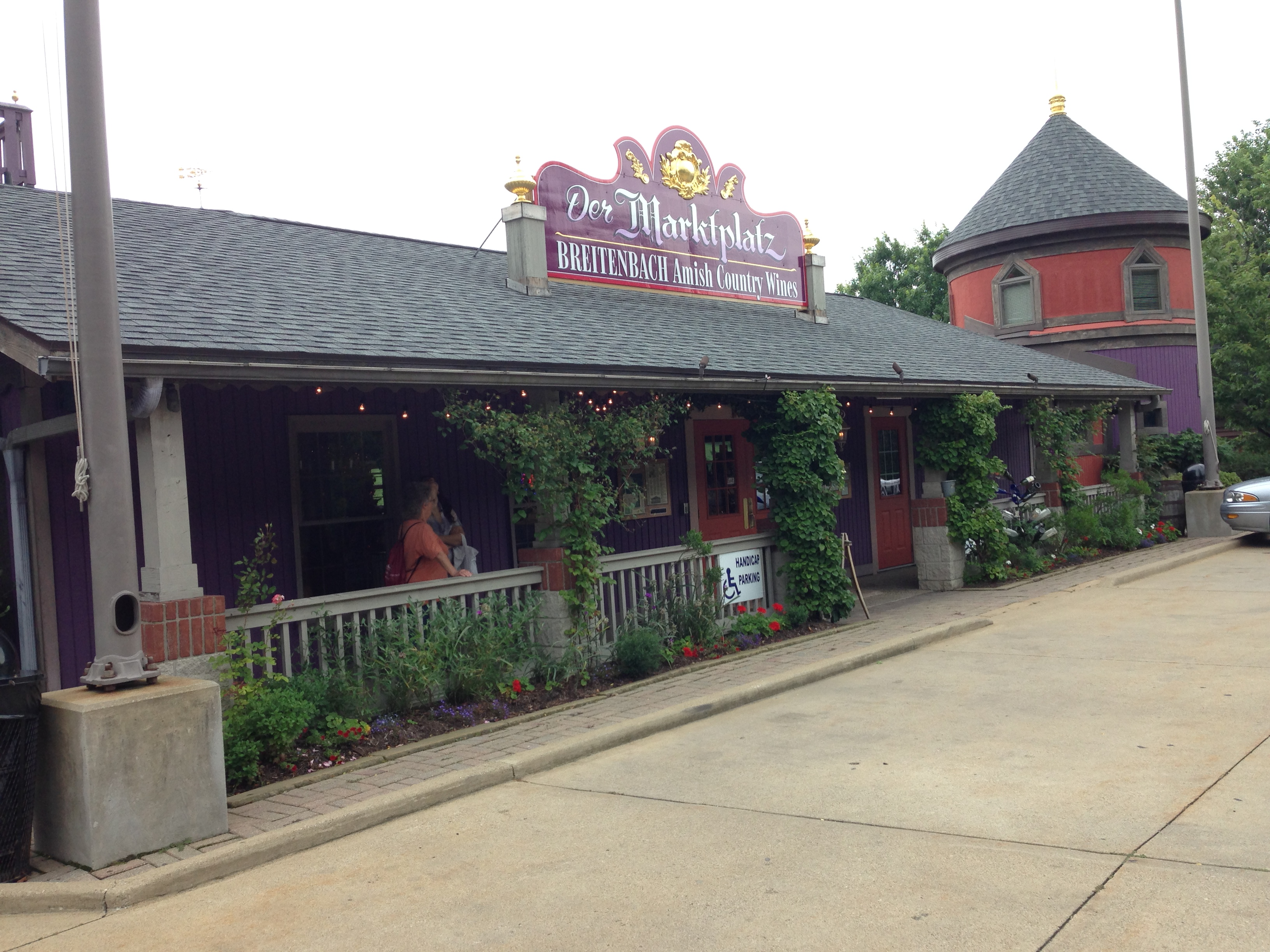
- Winery east of Sugarcreek

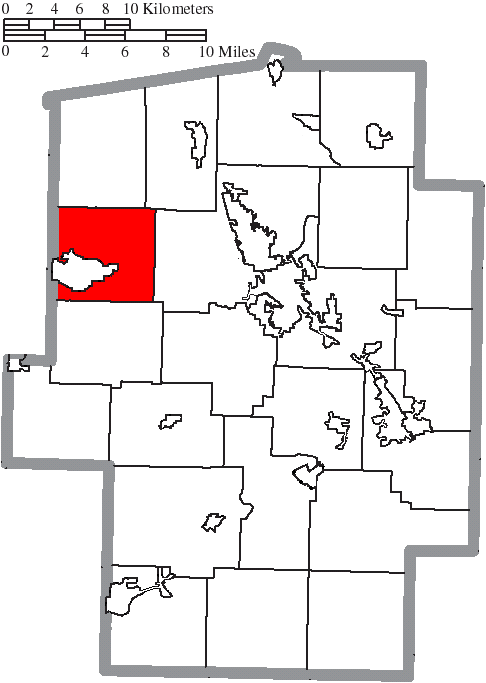
- Location of Sugar Creek Township in Tuscarawas County
- Coordinates: 40°30′44″N 81°37′50″W
- Country: United States
- State: Ohio
- County: Tuscarawas

Area
  - Total: 23.4 sq mi (60.6 km^{2})
  - Land: 23.4 sq mi (60.6 km^{2})
  - Water: 0 sq mi (0.0 km^{2})
- Elevation: 980 ft (300 m)

Population (2020)
  - Total: 4,464
  - Density: 191/sq mi (73.7/km^{2})
- Time zone: UTC-5 (Eastern (EST))
  - Summer (DST): UTC-4 (EDT)
- ZIP code: 44681
- Area code: 330
- FIPS code: 39-75217
- GNIS feature ID: 1087066

Historical population
Census	Pop.	Note	%±
1990	3,666		—
2000	3,894		6.2%
2010	4,194		7.7%
2020	4,464		6.4%
U.S. Census:

Sugar Creek Township is one of the twenty-two townships of Tuscarawas County, Ohio, United States. The 2020 census found 4,464 people in the township.

== Geography ==
Located in the northwestern part of the county, it borders the following townships:

- Wayne Township - north
- Franklin Township - northeast
- Dover Township - east
- Auburn Township - south
- Clark Township, Holmes County - southwest
- Walnut Creek Township, Holmes County - northwest

The village of Sugarcreek is located in western Sugar Creek Township.

== Name and history ==
It is one of five Sugar Creek Townships statewide.

== Government ==
The township is governed by a three-member board of trustees, who are elected in November of odd-numbered years to a four-year term beginning on the following January 1. Two are elected in the year after the presidential election and one is elected in the year before it. There is also an elected township fiscal officer, who serves a four-year term beginning on April 1 of the year after the election, which is held in November of the year before the presidential election. Vacancies in the fiscal officership or on the board of trustees are filled by the remaining trustees.
