= Farmerstown, Ohio =

- Unincorporated community
- Location within Ohio Location within the United States
- Coordinates: 40°29′14″N 81°43′32″W
- Country: United States
- State: Ohio
- County: Holmes
- Township: Clark
- Elevation: 1,132 ft (345 m)
- Time zone: UTC-5 (Eastern (EST))
  - Summer (DST): UTC-4 (EDT)
- Area codes: 234 & 330
- GNIS feature ID: 1064641

Farmerstown is an unincorporated community in Clark Township, Holmes County, Ohio, United States. It lies along State Route 557.
