= Dover Township, Tuscarawas County, Ohio =

Township in Ohio, US

- Township
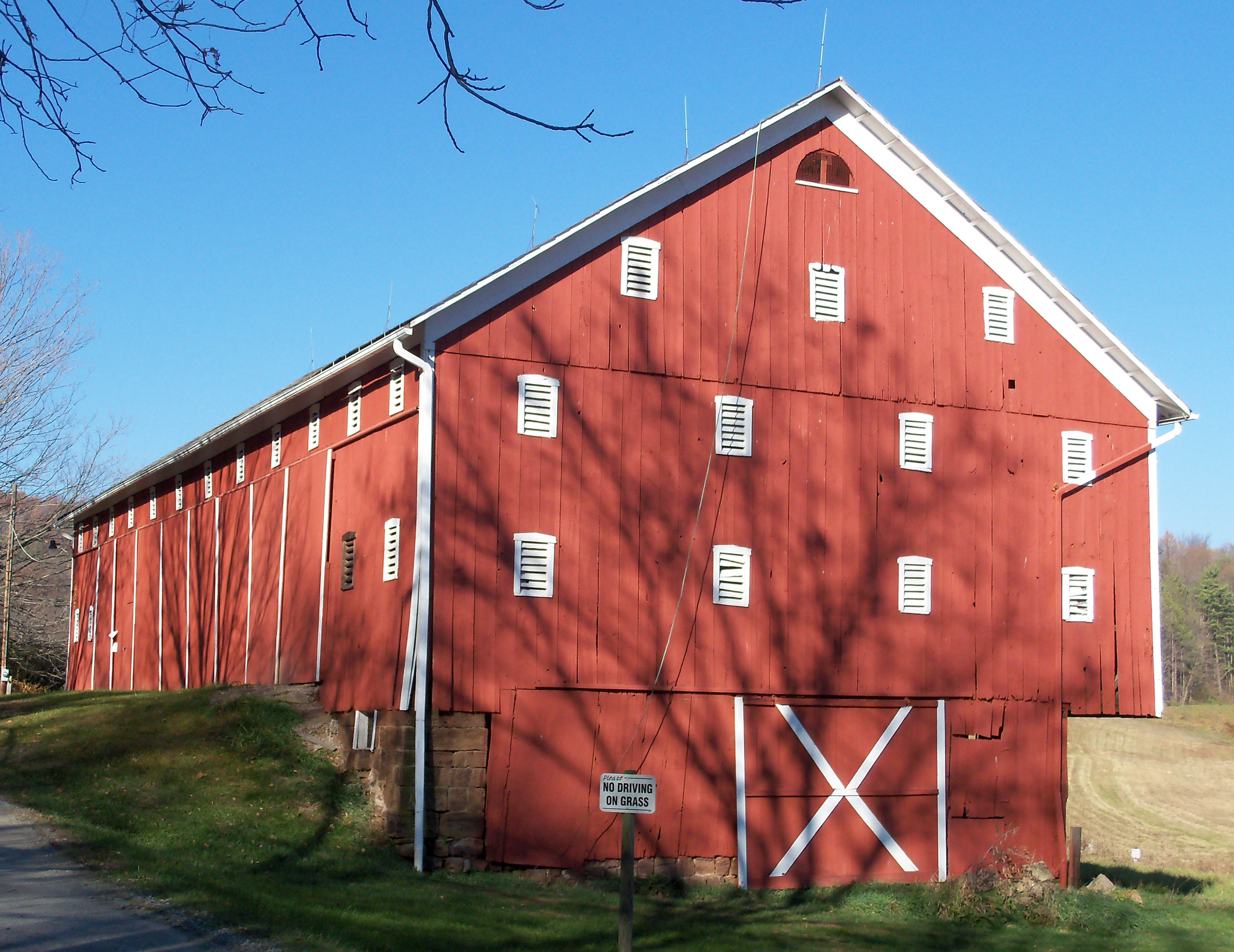
- Christian Pershing Barn

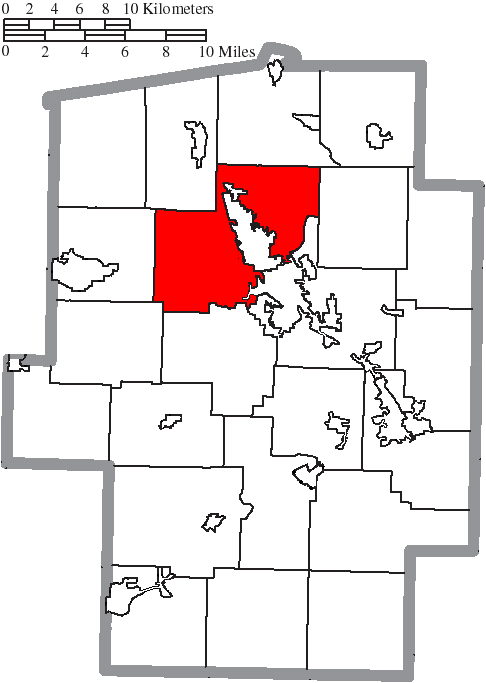
- Location of Dover Township in Tuscarawas County
- Coordinates: 40°31′35″N 81°30′5″W
- Country: United States
- State: Ohio
- County: Tuscarawas

Area
  - Total: 36.6 sq mi (94.9 km^{2})
  - Land: 36.3 sq mi (94.1 km^{2})
  - Water: 0.31 sq mi (0.8 km^{2})
- Elevation: 902 ft (275 m)

Population (2020)
  - Total: 4,515
  - Density: 120/sq mi (48/km^{2})
- Time zone: UTC-5 (Eastern (EST))
  - Summer (DST): UTC-4 (EDT)
- ZIP code: 44622
- Area code: 330
- FIPS code: 39-22470
- GNIS feature ID: 1087053

Dover Township is one of the twenty-two townships of Tuscarawas County, Ohio, United States. The 2020 census found 4,515 people in the township

== Geography ==
Located in the northern part of the county, it borders the following townships:

- Lawrence Township - north
- Fairfield Township - northeast
- Goshen Township - southeast
- York Township - south
- Auburn Township - southwest
- Sugar Creek Township - west
- Franklin Township - northwest

Two municipalities are located in Dover Township: the city of Dover occupies much of the center of the township, and the village of Parral is located in the township's north.

== Name and history ==
Statewide, other Dover Townships are located in Athens, Fulton, and Union counties.

== Government ==
The township is governed by a three-member board of trustees, who are elected in November of odd-numbered years to a four-year term beginning on the following January 1. Two are elected in the year after the presidential election and one is elected in the year before it. There is also an elected township fiscal officer, who serves a four-year term beginning on April 1 of the year after the election, which is held in November of the year before the presidential election. Vacancies in the fiscal officership or on the board of trustees are filled by the remaining trustees. The current trustees are John Fondriest, John Miceli, and Terry Steel, and the fiscal officer is Drew Yosick.
