= Bethlehem Township, Stark County, Ohio =

Township in Ohio, US

Bethlehem Township
- Civil township
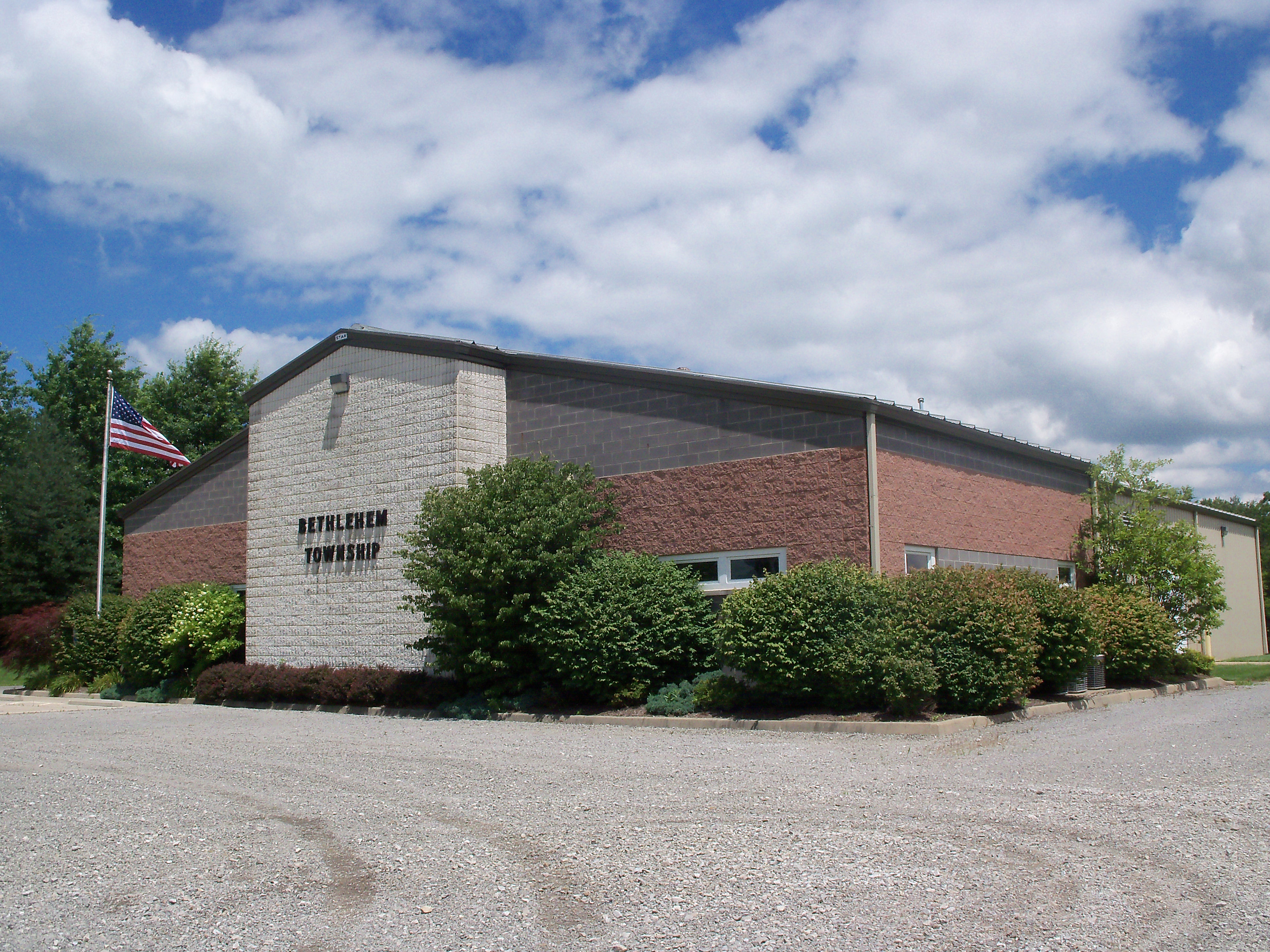
- township meeting house and garage

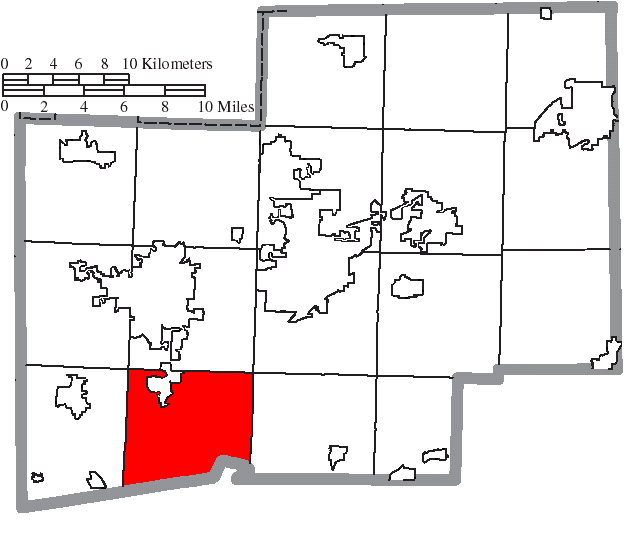
- Location of Bethlehem Township in Stark County
- Coordinates: 40°42′44″N 81°30′14″W
- Country: United States
- State: Ohio
- County: Stark

Area
  - Total: 33.4 sq mi (86.6 km^{2})
  - Land: 33.4 sq mi (86.4 km^{2})
  - Water: 0.077 sq mi (0.2 km^{2})
- Elevation: 1,020 ft (311 m)

Population (2020)
  - Total: 5,520
  - Density: 166/sq mi (63.9/km^{2})
- Time zone: UTC-5 (Eastern (EST))
  - Summer (DST): UTC-4 (EDT)
- FIPS code: 39-06180
- GNIS feature ID: 1086973
- Website: https://bethtwp.com/

Bethlehem Township is one of the seventeen townships of Stark County, Ohio, United States. The 2020 census found 5,520 people in the township.

== Geography ==
Located in the southwestern part of the county, it borders the following townships:

- Perry Township - north
- Canton Township - northeast corner
- Pike Township - east
- Lawrence Township, Tuscarawas County - southeast
- Franklin Township, Tuscarawas County - southwest
- Sugar Creek Township - west
- Tuscarawas Township - northwest corner

Most of the village of Navarre is located in northwestern Bethlehem Township. A very small portion of the city of Massillon also lies within the northwest portion of the township. The township also contains the unincorporated community of Smoketown within its east central portion.

== Name and history ==
Statewide, the only other Bethlehem Township is located in Coshocton County.

Bethlehem Township was described in 1833 as having two stores and two sawmills.

== Government ==
Historical population
Census	Pop.	Note	%±
1820	489		—
1830	886		81.2%
1840	1,019		15.0%
1850	2,398		135.3%
1860	2,401		0.1%
1870	2,148		−10.5%
1880	2,304		7.3%
1890	2,290		−0.6%
1900	2,236		−2.4%
1910	2,495		11.6%
1920	2,393		−4.1%
1930	2,929		22.4%
1940	3,227		10.2%
1950	3,568		10.6%
1960	4,277		19.9%
1970	4,528		5.9%
1990	5,803		—
2000	5,650		−2.6%
2010	5,347		−5.4%
2020	5,520		3.2%

The township is governed by a three-member board of trustees, who are elected in November of odd-numbered years to a four-year term beginning on the following January 1. Two are elected in the year after the presidential election and one is elected in the year before it. There is also an elected township fiscal officer, who serves a four-year term beginning on April 1 of the year after the election, which is held in November of the year before the presidential election. Vacancies in the fiscal officership or on the board of trustees are filled by the remaining trustees.
