= Ohio State Route 236 =

State highway in northeastern Ohio, US

State Route 236

Route information
- Maintained by ODOT
- Length: 8.05 mi (12.96 km)

Major junctions
- South end: SR 21 in Massillon
- North end: SR 93 in New Franklin

Location
- Country: United States
- State: Ohio
- Counties: Stark, Summit

Highway system
- Ohio State Highway System; Interstate; US; State; Scenic
← SR 235	→ SR 237

State Route 236 (SR 236, OH 236) is a two-lane north–south state highway in the northeastern portion of the U.S. state of Ohio. Its southern terminus is at a signalized intersection with State Route 21 in the northern end of Massillon. The northern terminus of the route is at a Y-intersection with State Route 93 in New Franklin. The route follows part of the Ohio & Erie Canal Towpath.

== Route description ==
State Route 236 traverses portions of northwestern Stark County, namely the city of Massillon as well as Perry, Jackson and Lawrence townships, and New Franklin in southern Summit County. The route is not included as a part of the National Highway System.

== History ==
SR 236 was commissioned in 1924, along current SR 93, between Canal Fulton and its current northern terminus. In 1925 SR 236 was rerouted onto its current alignment from near Crystal Springs to the northern terminus with SR 93. Between 1955 and 1957, the southern terminus was moved, to its current location, in Massillon.

== Major intersections ==
County	Location	mi	km	Destinations	Notes
Stark	Massillon	0.00	0.00	SR 21	
Summit	New Franklin	8.05	12.96	SR 93	
1.000 mi = 1.609 km; 1.000 km = 0.621 mi
