= Ironton–Russell Bridge =

Ironton–Russell Bridge (current)
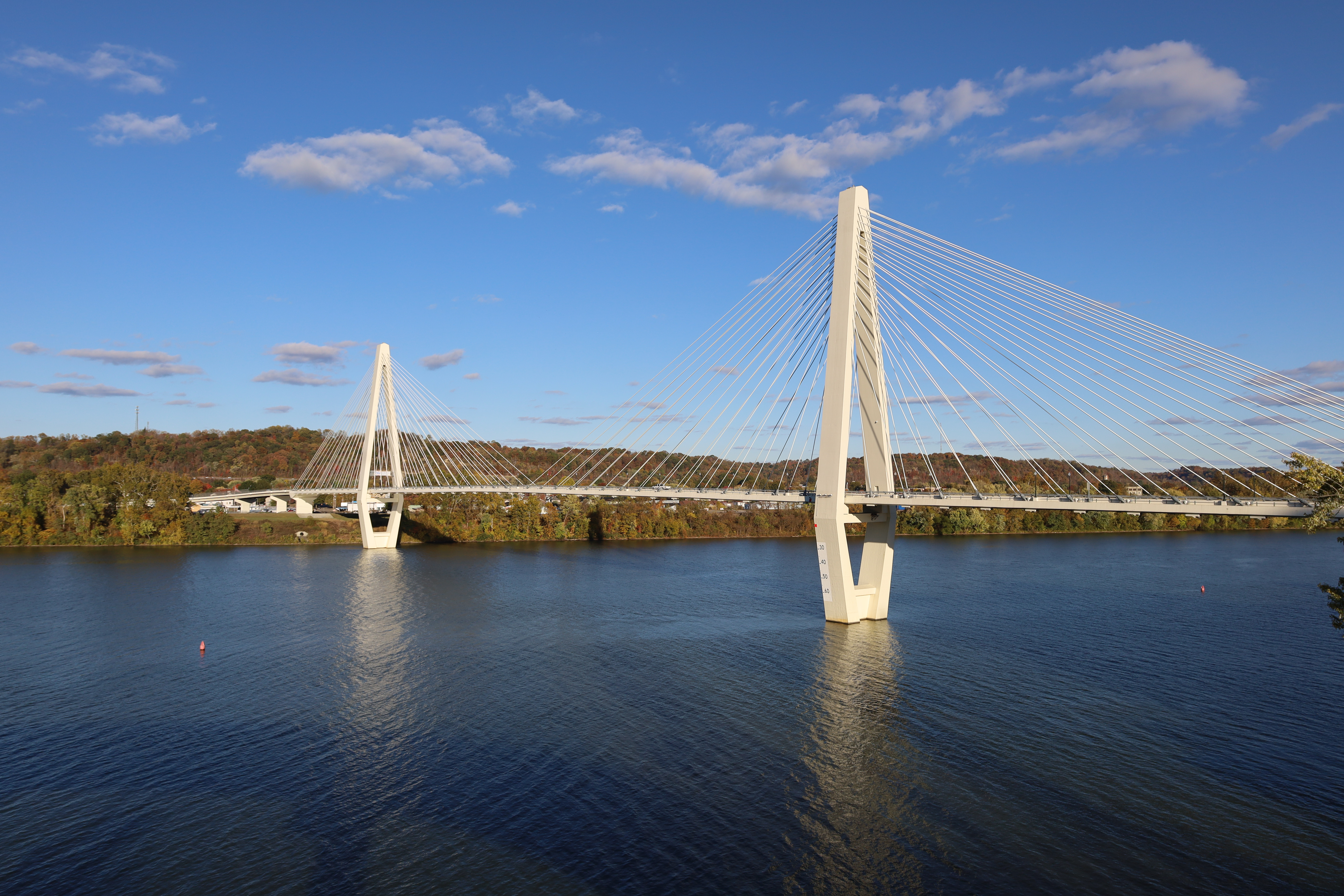
- The current bridge in 2023
- Coordinates: 38.5257°N 82.6852°W
- Carries: 2 lanes
- Crosses: Ohio River
- Locale: Ironton, Ohio and Russell, Kentucky
- Official name: Oakley C. Collins Memorial Bridge
- Maintained by: Ohio Department of Transportation

Characteristics
- Design: Cable-stayed bridge
- Material: Concrete
- Longest span: 902 feet (275 m)

History
- Construction start: 2013
- Construction end: Autumn 2016
- Opened: November 23, 2016

The Ironton–Russell Bridge can refer to either one of two bridges that carry/carried traffic along the Ohio River between Ironton, Ohio and Russell, Kentucky in the United States. The original blue cantilever Ironton–Russell Bridge, opened in 1922 and closed in 2016, carried two lanes of traffic and a narrow sidewalk. The new white cable-stayed bridge, officially named the Oakley C. Collins Memorial Bridge, has two lanes of traffic without a dedicated sidewalk and opened on November 23, 2016.

== Original bridge ==
The original purple cantilever Ironton–Russell Bridge opened in 1922. It carried two lanes of traffic and a narrow sidewalk.

The bridge was retrofitted in the 1970s with strengthening beams and plates. Later inspection of the bridge revealed that these plates had been welded to the bridge using techniques that violated the bridge welding codes and reduced the fatigue strength of primary load members. As a result of these findings, ODOT added reinforcements to some vertical members to improve structural redundancy.

Ironton–Russell Bridge (former)
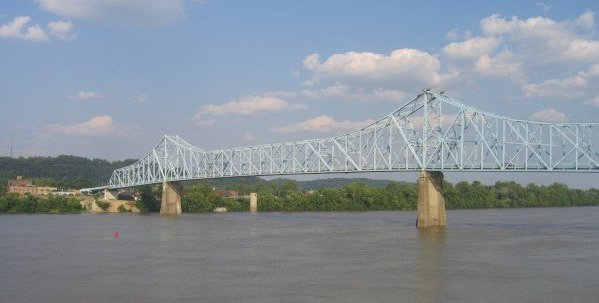
- Original Ironton-Russell Bridge
- Coordinates: 38°31′55″N 82°41′20″W
- Carries: 2 lanes
- Crosses: Ohio River
- Locale: Ironton, Ohio and Russell, Kentucky
- Maintained by: Ohio Department of Transportation

Characteristics
- Design: Cantilever bridge
- Longest span: 722 feet (220 m)

History
- Opened: August 1922
- Closed: November 23, 2016 (demolished 2016-2017)

Statistics
- Toll: Former

The original span was still forced to close when temperatures approach –5 degrees Fahrenheit due to the brittle nature of the steel used. Continuous monitoring was routine during temperatures below freezing to check for any cracking in the substructure of the span. In addition, in May 2008, ODOT placed a width restriction on the bridge, banning all vehicles wider than 7 ft. 6 in. Emergency vehicles, non-commercial vehicles and non-profit buses (such as school buses) were exempt from the restriction. ODOT authorized both Ohio and Kentucky law enforcement agencies to enforce the restriction.

The original bridge remained open during construction of the new bridge, and was permanently closed at the completion of the dedication ceremony and parade. Demolition of the original structure began in December 2016 and was completed in June 2017.

== Current bridge ==
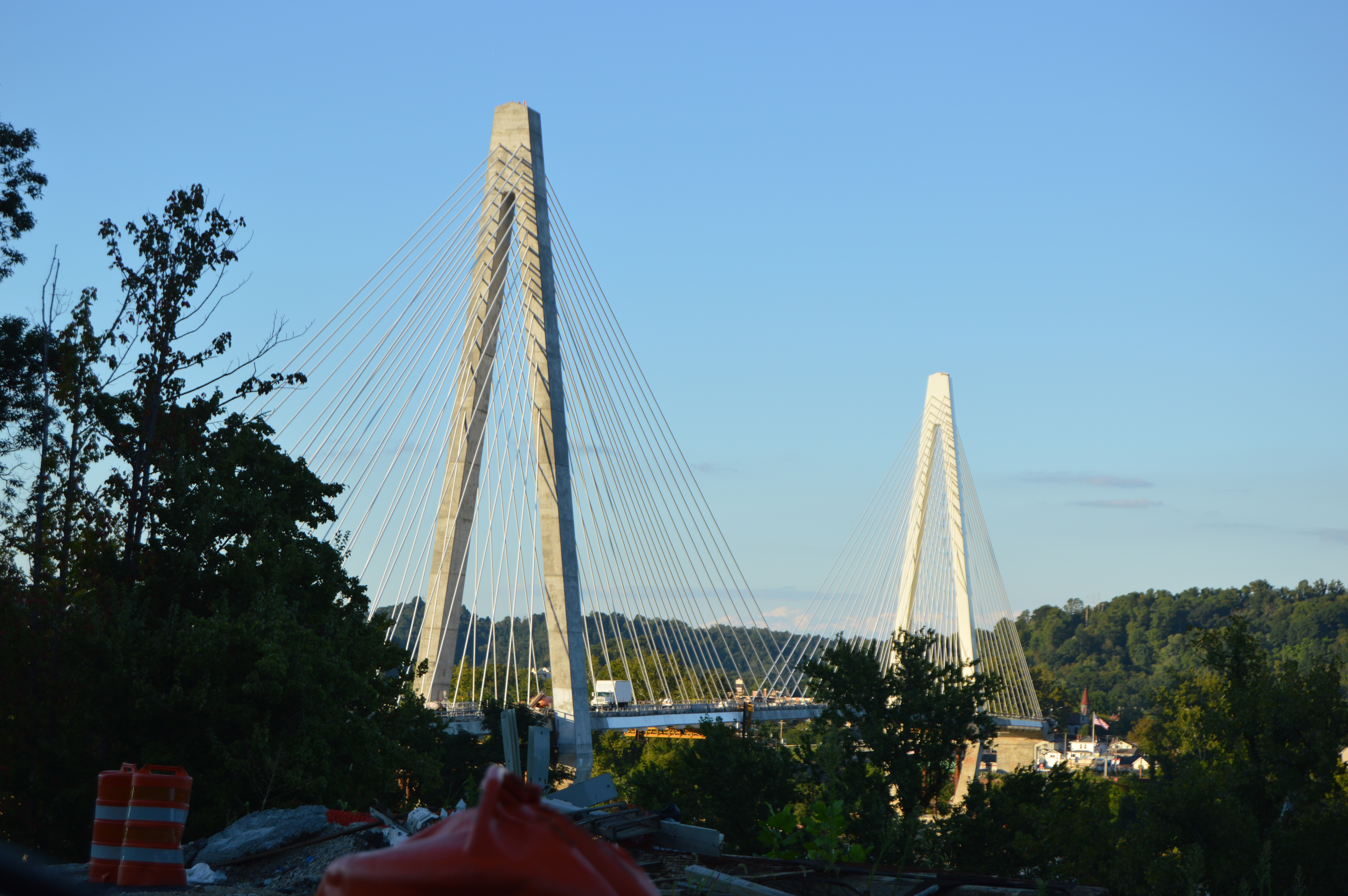
The bridge in a late stage of construction in 2016

In 2000, the Ohio Department of Transportation (ODOT) released a report recommending the replacement of the then 78-year-old original span. One of the replacements considered was a three-lane single-tower cable suspension bridge. The final design was chosen in January 2003, however, the high costs of constructing the bridge became apparent when costs for the new bridge came in at $110 million, well over the original estimated cost. The sharp rise was attributed to the dramatic increase in construction costs partially blamed on Hurricane Katrina, which increased the cost of concrete materials and items derived from petroleum products.

The bridge was designed as a two tower cable-stayed bridge, was reduced from three lanes to two and does not have a dedicated pedestrian walkway. Construction on the replacement span began in March 2012. Unlike the original bridge, which connects downtown Ironton with downtown Russell, the new bridge connects downtown Ironton directly with U.S. 23 and KY 244 within the city limits of Russell just south of downtown.

The new bridge opened on November 23, 2016, with a ceremony and parade through Ironton and Russell that included crossing both the new and original structures. As part of the ceremony, the new bridge was officially named for the late Oakley C. Collins, who represented Lawrence County in both the Ohio House of Representatives and the Ohio Senate.

The Russell approach was partially demolished in 2021 with the related chiseling of the original KY 244 viaduct and the opening of the new viaduct and new US 23/KY 244/KY 750 intersection approximately 500 feet north of the bridge.

== See also ==
- List of crossings of the Ohio River
