= Charm, Ohio =

Unincorporated community in Ohio, U.S.

Coordinates: 40°30′24″N 81°47′05″W

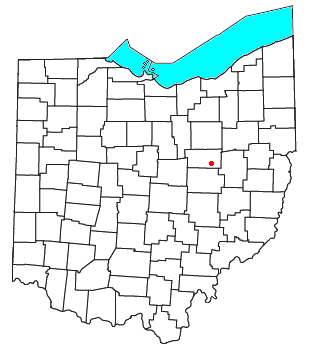
Location of Charm, Ohio

Charm is an unincorporated community in northwestern Clark Township, Holmes County, Ohio, United States. It has a post office with the ZIP code 44617. It lies along State Route 557.

== History ==
The origin of the name "Charm" is obscure.

Baby Swiss cheese was developed in the mid-1960s outside of Charm, Ohio, by the Guggisberg Cheese Company, owned by Alfred Guggisberg.
