= Clark Township, Holmes County, Ohio =

Township in Ohio, US

- Township
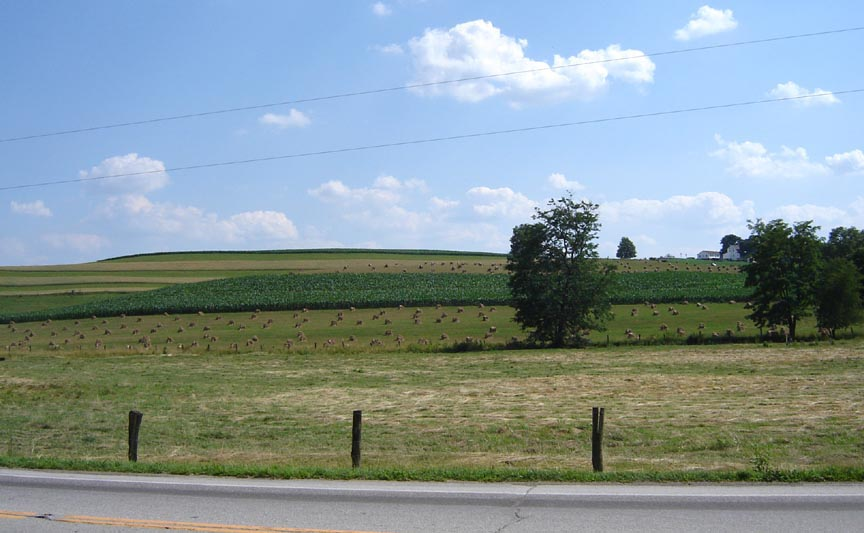
- Fields east of Charm on State Route 557

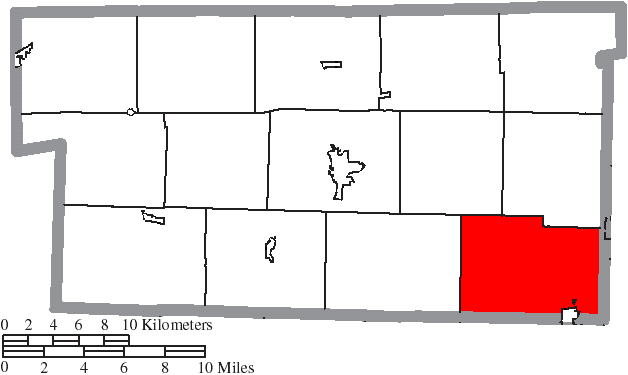
- Location of Clark Township in Holmes County
- Coordinates: 40°28′24″N 81°44′21″W
- Country: United States
- State: Ohio
- County: Holmes

Area
  - Total: 34.6 sq mi (89.5 km^{2})
  - Land: 34.5 sq mi (89.4 km^{2})
  - Water: 0.039 sq mi (0.1 km^{2})
- Elevation: 1,056 ft (322 m)

Population (2020)
  - Total: 4,322
  - Density: 125/sq mi (48.3/km^{2})
- Time zone: UTC-5 (Eastern (EST))
  - Summer (DST): UTC-4 (EDT)
- FIPS code: 39-15280
- GNIS feature ID: 1086328

Historical population
Census	Pop.	Note	%±
1990	2,946		—
2000	3,712		26.0%
2010	4,080		9.9%
2020	4,322		5.9%
2024 (est.)	4,404		1.9%
US Census:

Clark Township is one of the fourteen townships of Holmes County, Ohio, United States. As of the 2020 census the population of the township was 4,322.

== Geography ==
Located in the southeastern corner of the county, it borders the following townships:

- Walnut Creek Township - north
- Sugar Creek Township, Tuscarawas County - northeast
- Auburn Township, Tuscarawas County - east
- Bucks Township, Tuscarawas County - southeast
- Crawford Township, Coshocton County - south
- Mill Creek Township, Coshocton County - southwest corner
- Mechanic Township - west
- Berlin Township - northwest

Part of the village of Baltic is located in southeastern Clark Township, and the unincorporated communities of Charm, Farmerstown, and Unionville lie in the northwestern, central, and northeastern parts of the township.

== Name and history ==
Statewide, other Clark Townships are located in Brown, Clinton, and Coshocton counties. It was originally named German Township, but its name was changed to Clark Township in the 1910s.

== Government ==
The township is governed by a three-member board of trustees, who are elected in November of odd-numbered years to a four-year term beginning on the following January 1. Two are elected in the year after the presidential election and one is elected in the year before it. There is also an elected township fiscal officer, who serves a four-year term beginning on April 1 of the year after the election, which is held in November of the year before the presidential election. Vacancies in the fiscal officership or on the board of trustees are filled by the remaining trustees.
