= Wayne Township, Tuscarawas County, Ohio =

Township in Ohio, US

- Township
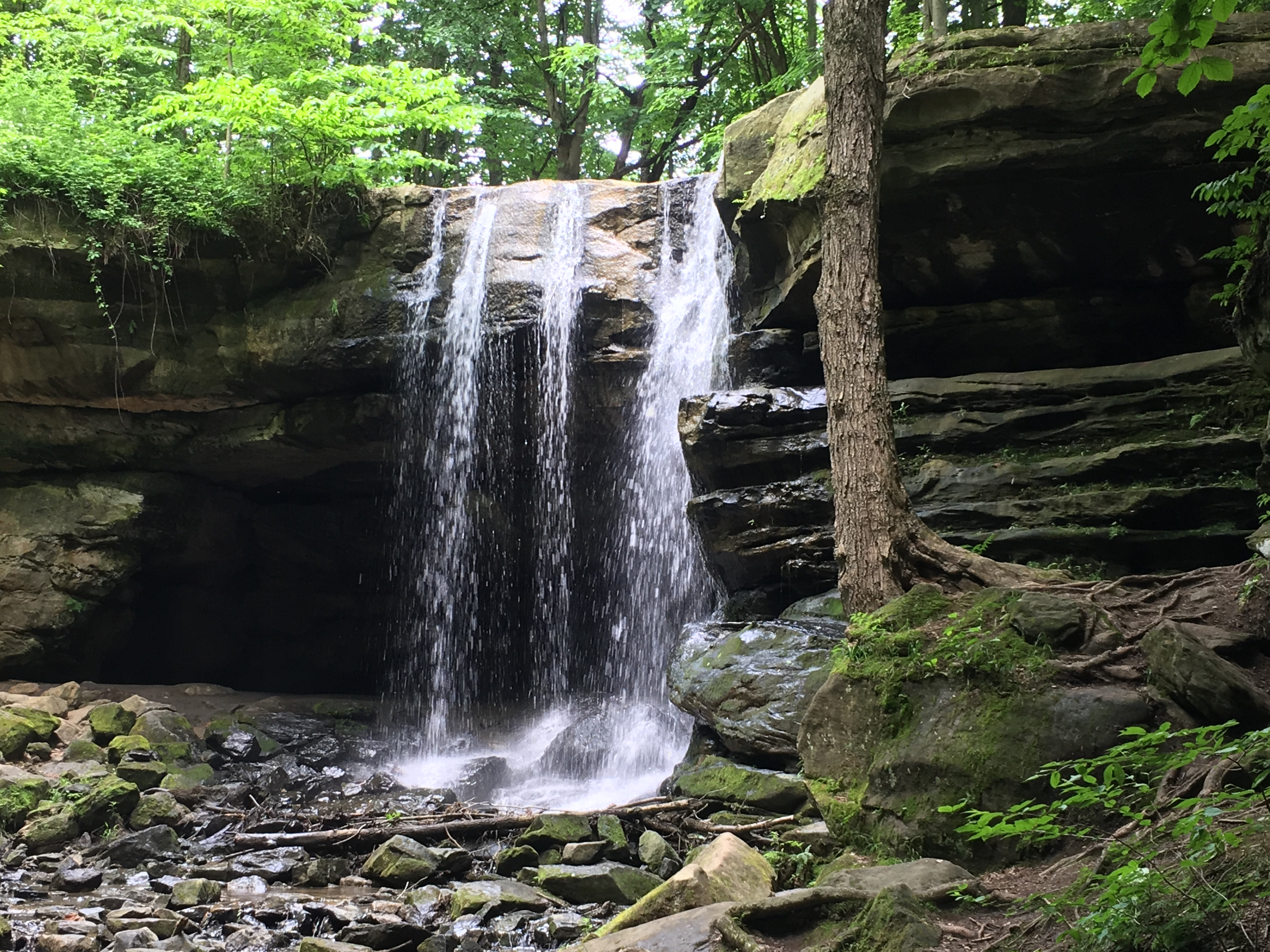
- Dundee Falls

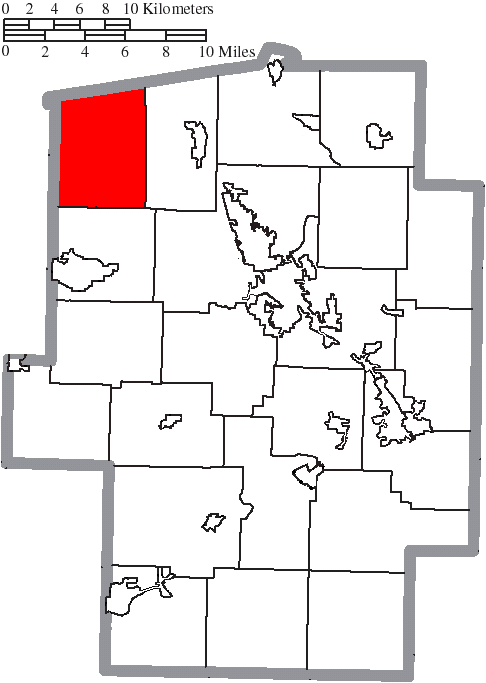
- Location of Wayne Township in Tuscarawas County
- Coordinates: 40°35′38″N 81°37′2″W
- Country: United States
- State: Ohio
- County: Tuscarawas

Area
  - Total: 26.6 sq mi (69.0 km^{2})
  - Land: 26.6 sq mi (68.8 km^{2})
  - Water: 0.077 sq mi (0.2 km^{2})
- Elevation: 958 ft (292 m)

Population (2020)
  - Total: 2,409
  - Density: 91/sq mi (35/km^{2})
- Time zone: UTC-5 (Eastern (EST))
  - Summer (DST): UTC-4 (EDT)
- FIPS code: 39-82292
- GNIS feature ID: 1087071

Historical population
Census	Pop.	Note	%±
1990	1,255		—
2000	1,743		38.9%
2010	2,164		24.2%
2020	2,409		11.3%
U.S. Census:

Wayne Township is one of the twenty-two townships of Tuscarawas County, Ohio, United States. The 2020 census found 2,409 people in the township.

== Geography ==
Located in the northwestern corner part of the county, it borders the following townships:

- Sugar Creek Township, Stark County - north
- Franklin Township - east
- Sugar Creek Township - south
- Walnut Creek Township, Holmes County - southwest
- Paint Township, Holmes County - northwest

No municipalities are located in Wayne Township, although the census-designated place of Dundee lies at the center of the township.

== Name and history ==
It is one of twenty Wayne Townships statewide.

Wayne Township was organized in 1810.

== Government ==
The township is governed by a three-member board of trustees, who are elected in November of odd-numbered years to a four-year term beginning on the following January 1. Two are elected in the year after the presidential election and one is elected in the year before it. There is also an elected township fiscal officer, who serves a four-year term beginning on April 1 of the year after the election, which is held in November of the year before the presidential election. Vacancies in the fiscal officership or on the board of trustees are filled by the remaining trustees.
