= Franklin Township, Tuscarawas County, Ohio =

Township in Ohio, US

- Township
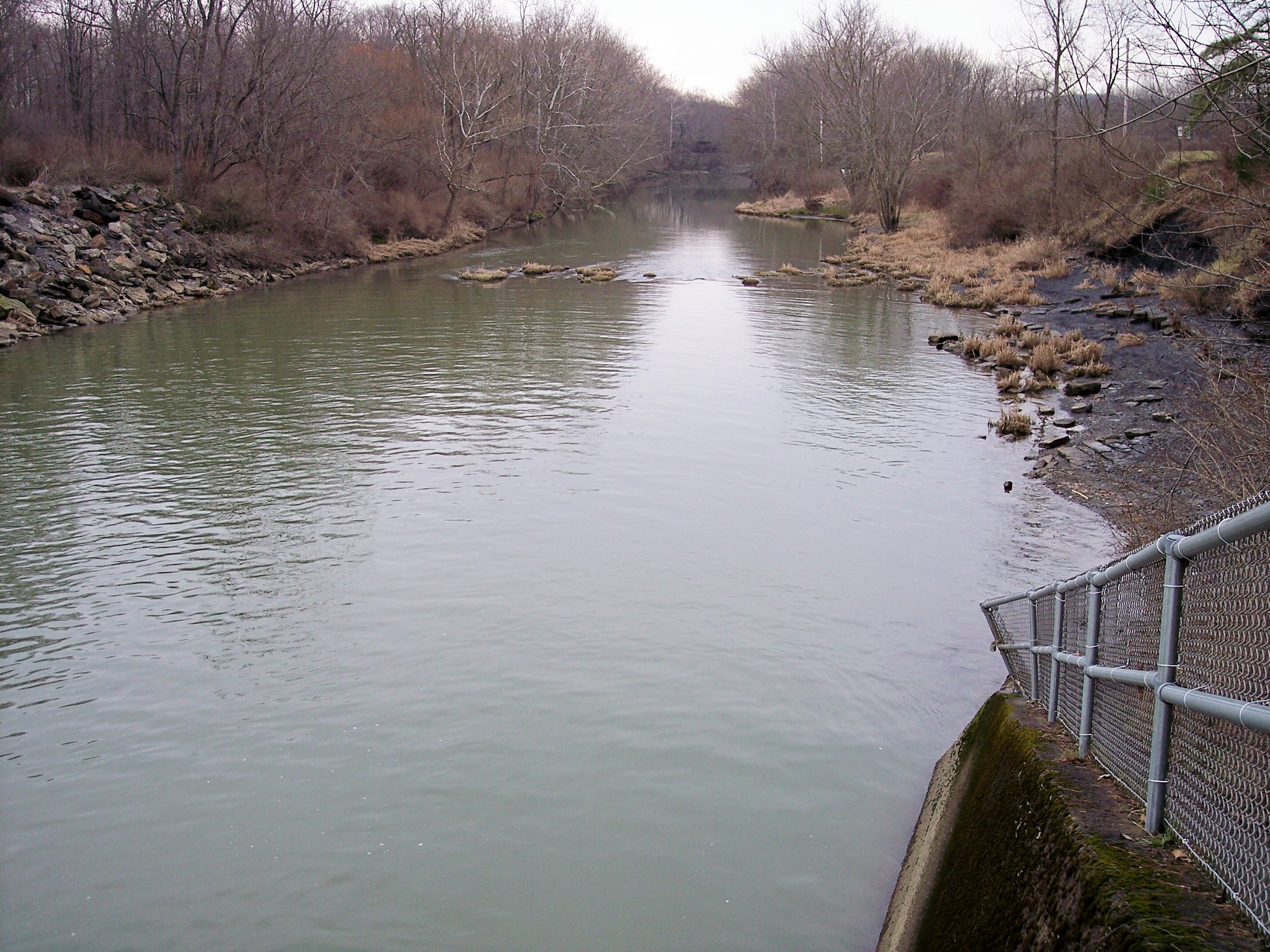
- Sugar Creek just below the Beach City Dam

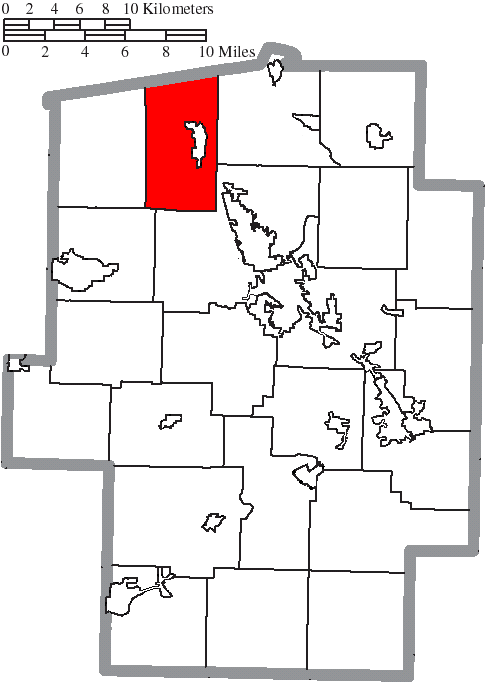
- Location of Franklin Township in Tuscarawas County
- Coordinates: 40°35′39″N 81°31′59″W
- Country: United States
- State: Ohio
- County: Tuscarawas

Area
  - Total: 23.4 sq mi (60.5 km^{2})
  - Land: 23.1 sq mi (59.9 km^{2})
  - Water: 0.27 sq mi (0.7 km^{2})
- Elevation: 942 ft (287 m)

Population (2020)
  - Total: 4,846
  - Density: 210/sq mi (80.9/km^{2})
- Time zone: UTC-5 (Eastern (EST))
  - Summer (DST): UTC-4 (EDT)
- FIPS code: 39-28462
- GNIS feature ID: 1087055
- Website: https://www.franklintwptusc.com/

Franklin Township is one of the twenty-two townships of Tuscarawas County, Ohio, United States. The 2020 census found 4,846 people in the township.

== Geography ==
Located in the northwestern part of the county, it borders the following townships:

- Bethlehem Township, Stark County - northeast
- Lawrence Township - east
- Dover Township - southeast
- Sugar Creek Township - southwest
- Wayne Township - west
- Sugar Creek Township, Stark County - northwest

The village of Strasburg is located in eastern Franklin Township.

== Name and history ==
It is one of twenty-one Franklin Townships statewide.

== Government ==
The township is governed by a three-member board of trustees, who are elected in November of odd-numbered years to a four-year term beginning on the following January 1. Two are elected in the year after the presidential election and one is elected in the year before it. There is also an elected township fiscal officer, who serves a four-year term beginning on April 1 of the year after the election, which is held in November of the year before the presidential election. Vacancies in the fiscal officership or on the board of trustees are filled by the remaining trustees. The current trustees are Max Bonifant, Randy Fearon, and Douglas Gene Hensel, and the fiscal officer is Tammy Spidell.
