= New Bedford, Ohio =

Coordinates: 40°26′41″N 81°45′54″W

New Bedford is an unincorporated community in Coshocton County, Ohio, United States.

== History ==
New Bedford originally consisted of several cabins and a single tavern. It was laid out in 1825. The community derives its name from Bedford County, Pennsylvania, the native home of a first settler. A post office called New Bedford was established in 1828, and remained in operation until 1955.
