= Strasburg, Ohio =

- Village
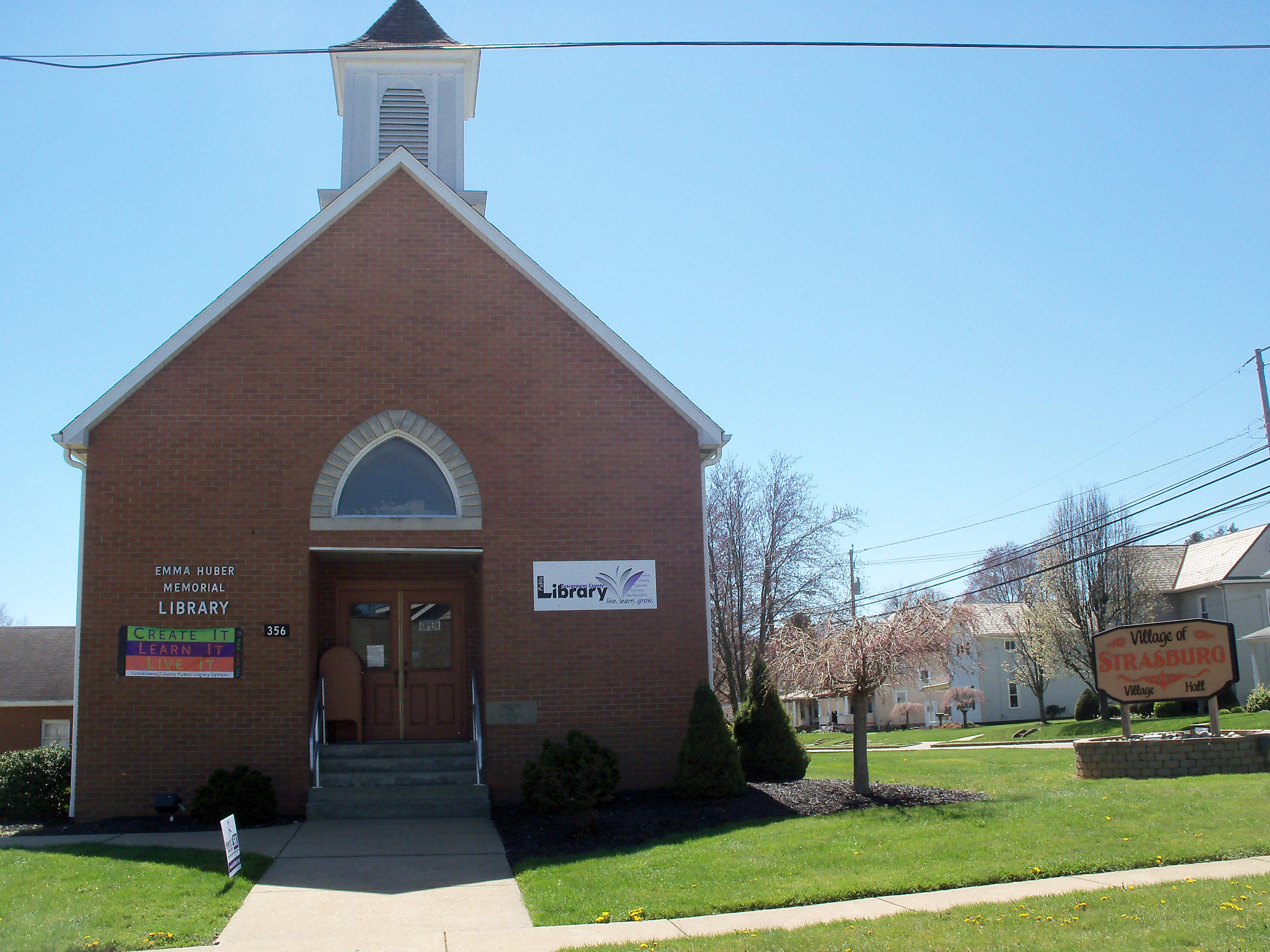
- Town hall and library

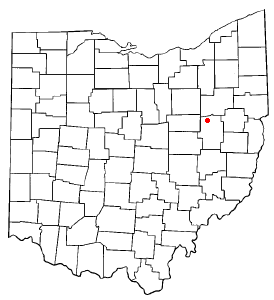
- Location of Strasburg, Ohio

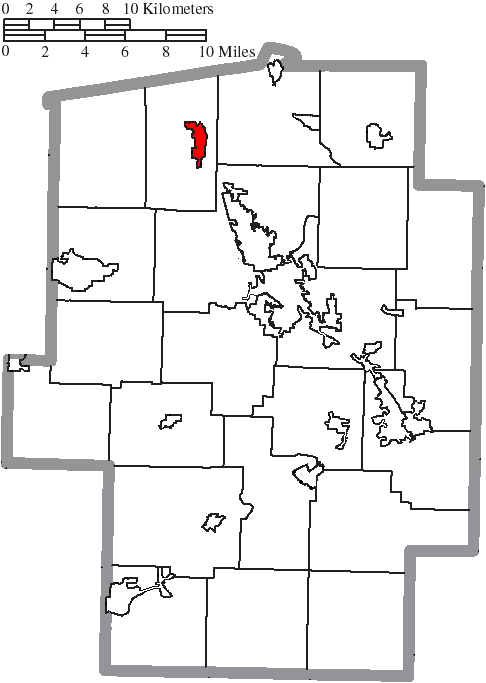
- Location of Strasburg in Tuscarawas County
- Coordinates: 40°36′02″N 81°31′46″W
- Country: United States
- State: Ohio
- County: Tuscarawas
- Township: Franklin

Area
  - Total: 1.44 sq mi (3.73 km^{2})
  - Land: 1.44 sq mi (3.73 km^{2})
  - Water: 0 sq mi (0.00 km^{2})
- Elevation: 919 ft (280 m)

Population (2020)
  - Total: 2,735
  - Density: 1,899.3/sq mi (733.33/km^{2})
- Time zone: UTC-5 (Eastern (EST))
  - Summer (DST): UTC-4 (EDT)
- ZIP code: 44680
- Area code: 330
- FIPS code: 39-74958
- GNIS feature ID: 2399915
- Website: https://www.villageofstrasburg.org/

Strasburg is a village in Tuscarawas County, Ohio, United States. The population was 2,735 at the 2020 census.

Strasburg is the location of the Lynn Auto Theatre and Strasburg-Franklin High School.

== History ==
The first settlement at Strasburg was made in 1828. A large share of the early settlers being natives of Strasbourg (German: Strasburg) caused the name to be selected.

== Geography ==
Strasburg is located along Sugar Creek.

According to the United States Census Bureau, the village has a total area of 1.39 square miles (3.60 km^{2}), all land.

== Demographics ==
Historical population
Census	Pop.	Note	%±
1850	109		—
1860	114		4.6%
1870	142		24.6%
1880	181		27.5%
1900	461		—
1910	835		81.1%
1920	917		9.8%
1930	1,305		42.3%
1940	1,297		−0.6%
1950	1,366		5.3%
1960	1,687		23.5%
1970	1,874		11.1%
1980	2,091		11.6%
1990	1,995		−4.6%
2000	2,310		15.8%
2010	2,608		12.9%
2020	2,735		4.9%
U.S. Decennial Census

=== 2010 census ===
As of the census of 2010, there were 2,608 people, 1,121 households, and 748 families living in the village. The population density was 1,876.3 inhabitants per square mile (724.4/km^{2}). There were 1,187 housing units at an average density of 854.0 per square mile (329.7/km^{2}). The racial makeup of the village was 97.5% White, 0.2% African American, 0.1% Native American, 0.4% Asian, 0.6% Pacific Islander, 0.9% from other races, and 0.3% from two or more races. Hispanic or Latino of any race were 1.6% of the population.

There were 1,121 households, of which 26.4% had children under the age of 18 living with them, 53.4% were married couples living together, 8.7% had a female householder with no husband present, 4.6% had a male householder with no wife present, and 33.3% were non-families. 27.7% of all households were made up of individuals, and 13.6% had someone living alone who was 65 years of age or older. The average household size was 2.33 and the average family size was 2.81.

The median age in the village was 44.1 years. 20.3% of residents were under the age of 18; 8.5% were between the ages of 18 and 24; 22.6% were from 25 to 44; 28.9% were from 45 to 64, and 19.7% were 65 years of age or older. The gender makeup of the village was 48.7% male and 51.3% female.

=== 2000 census ===
As of the census of 2000, there were 2,310 people, 947 households, and 646 families living in the village. The population density was 1,936.8 inhabitants per square mile (747.8/km^{2}). There were 988 housing units at an average density of 828.4 per square mile (319.8/km^{2}). The racial makeup of the village was 98.05% White, 0.09% African American, 0.13% Native American, 0.13% Asian, 0.35% Pacific Islander, 0.78% from other races, and 0.48% from two or more races. Hispanic or Latino of any race were 1.90% of the population.

There were 947 households, out of which 31.8% had children under the age of 18 living with them, 55.9% were married couples living together, 8.3% had a female householder with no husband present, and 31.7% were non-families. 27.5% of all households were made up of individuals, and 14.1% had someone living alone who was 65 years of age or older. The average household size was 2.42 and the average family size was 2.91.

In the village, the population was spread out, with 24.6% under the age of 18, 7.6% from 18 to 24, 29.6% from 25 to 44, 21.7% from 45 to 64, and 16.5% who were 65 years of age or older. The median age was 36 years. For every 100 females, there were 94.1 males. For every 100 females age 18 and over, there were 91.3 males.

The median income for a household in the village was $36,371, and the median income for a family was $44,583. Males had a median income of $31,171 versus $20,033 for females. The per capita income for the village was $16,389. About 4.6% of families and 8.2% of the population were below the poverty line, including 8.7% of those under age 18 and 14.4% of those age 65 or over.

== Education ==
Strasburg is served by a branch of the Tuscarawas County Public Library.
