= Sugar Creek (Tuscarawas River tributary) =

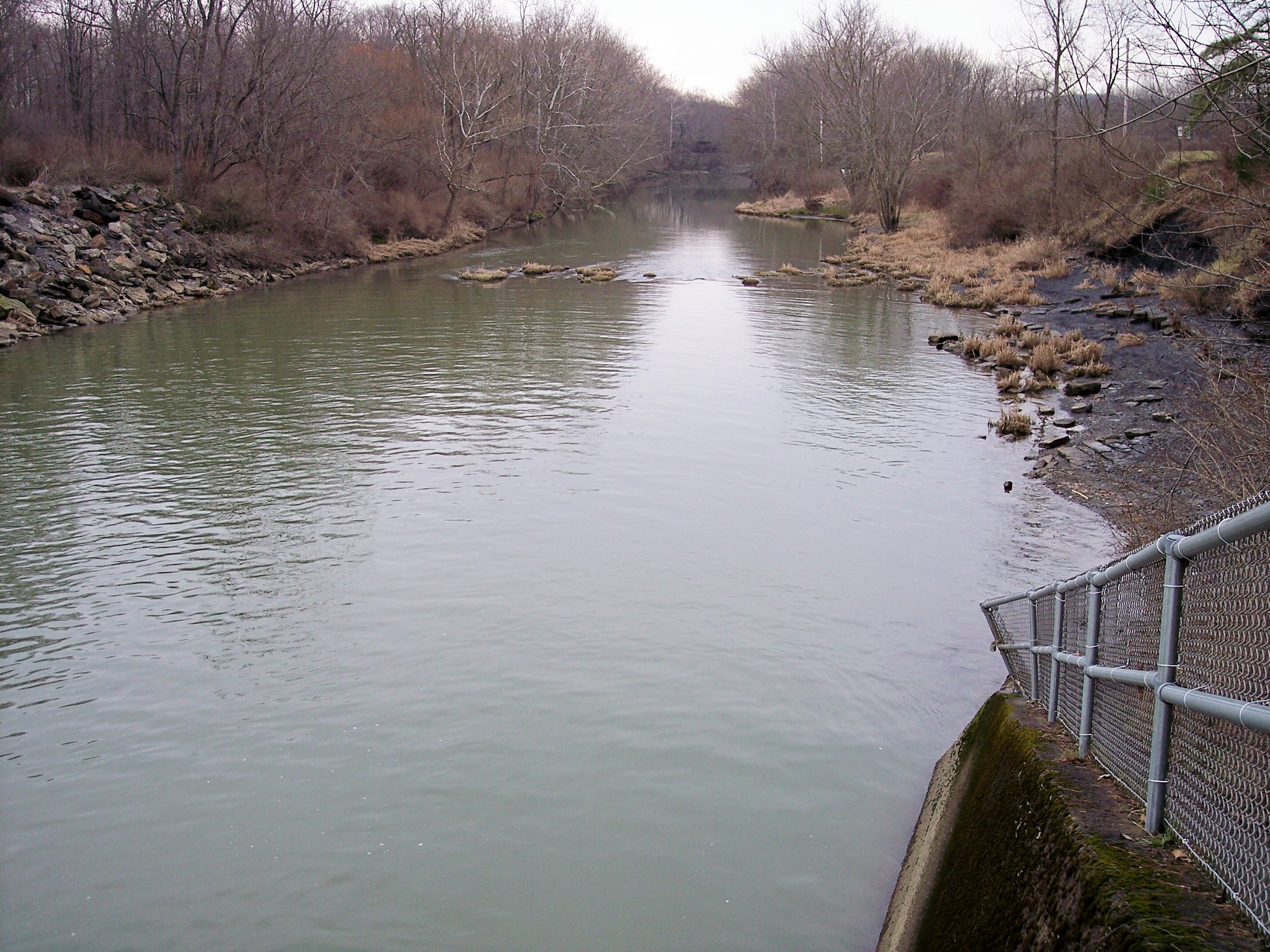
- Sugar Creek downstream of Beach City Dam in 2006

- Location of the mouth of Sugar Creek in Dover, Ohio

Location
- Country: United States
- State: Ohio

Physical characteristics
- Source
  - location: northwest of Smithville
  - coordinates: 40°54′32″N 81°55′07″W
- Mouth: Tuscarawas River
  - location: Dover
  - coordinates: 40°30′39″N 81°28′41″W
  - elevation: 856 ft (261 m)
- Length: 45 mi (72 km)
- Basin size: 356 sq mi (920 km^{2})
- Discharge
  - location: USGS gauge at Strasburg
  - average: 312.1 cu ft/s (8.84 m^{3}/s), water years 1932-2019

Sugar Creek is a tributary of the Tuscarawas River in northeastern Ohio in the United States. It is 45 miles (72 km) long. Via the Tuscarawas, Muskingum, and Ohio Rivers, it is part of the watershed of the Mississippi River, draining an area of 356 square miles (922 km^{2}) on glaciated and unglaciated portions of the Allegheny Plateau.

It is the namesake of Sugarcreek, Ohio and of townships in Stark, Tuscarawas and Wayne counties Ohio.

== Path of the river ==
It rises in north-central Wayne County, approximately five miles (8 km) northwest of Smithville, and flows southeastwardly through southwestern Stark County and northwestern Tuscarawas County, past the communities of Smithville, Brewster, Beach City and Strasburg to Dover, where it joins the Tuscarawas River from the west.

Along its course Sugar Creek collects several tributaries that have been given derivative names:

- Little Sugar Creek flows northwardly through southeastern Wayne County.
- North Fork Sugar Creek, which flows to the south of Sugar Creek, rises in southeastern Wayne County and flows eastwardly into southwestern Stark County.
- Middle Fork Sugar Creek rises in northeastern Holmes County and flows northeastwardly into Stark County, where it joins Sugar Creek from the south at Brewster.
- South Fork Sugar Creek rises in northeastern Holmes County and flows north-northeastwardly into northwestern Tuscarawas County, through the community of Sugarcreek.

Beach City Dam, in Tuscarawas County southeast of Beach City and just downstream of the mouth of the South Fork, was constructed in 1936 by the United States Army Corps of Engineers for the purpose of flood control.

== Name ==
Sugar Creek was named for the abundant sugar maples along its course. According to the Geographic Names Information System, Sugar Creek has also been known historically as:

- Margarets Creek
- Margets Creek
- Margret's Creek
- Margrets Creek

== See also ==
- List of rivers of Ohio
