= Beach City, Ohio =

- Village
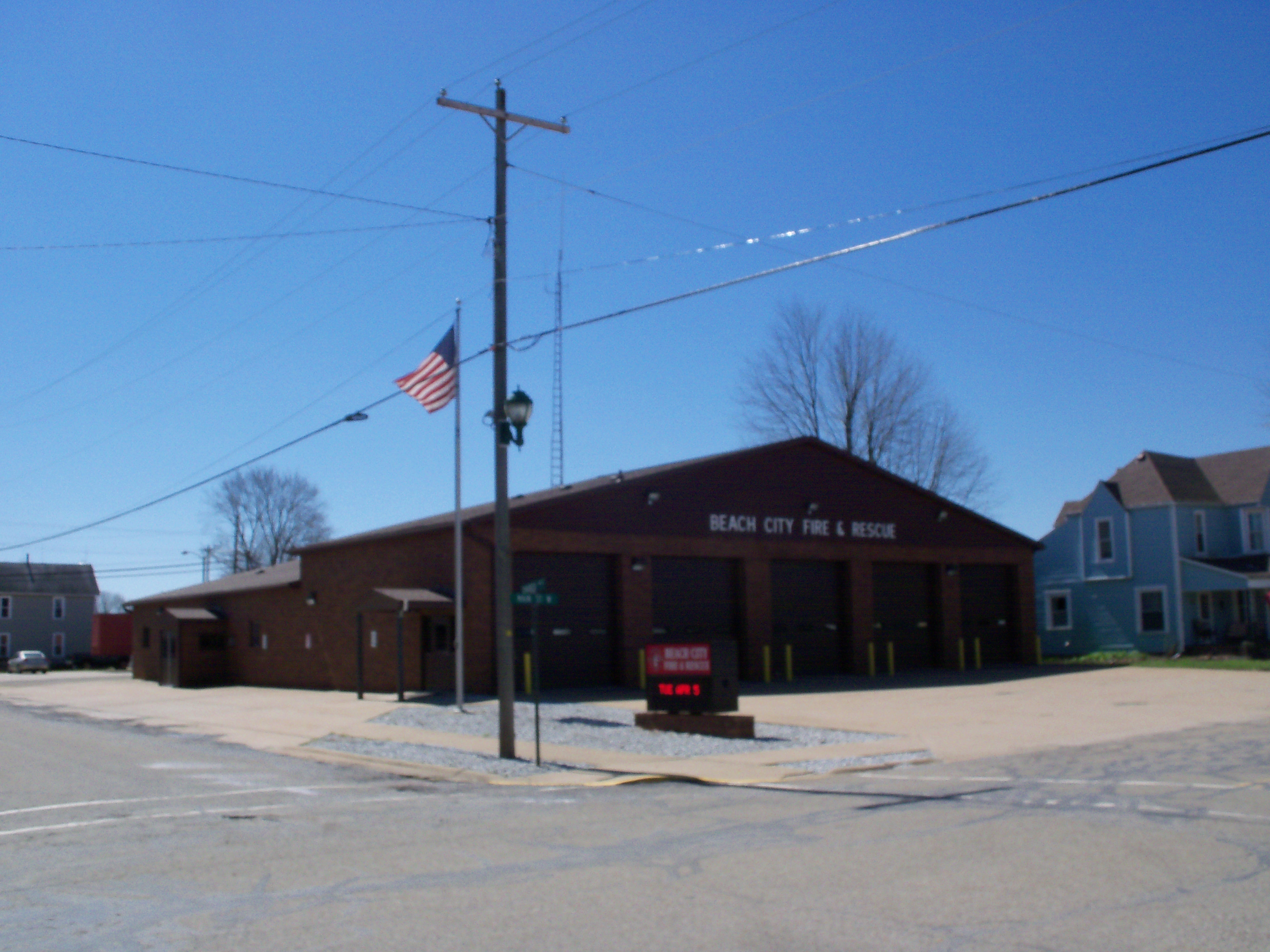
- Beach City Fire & Rescue depot

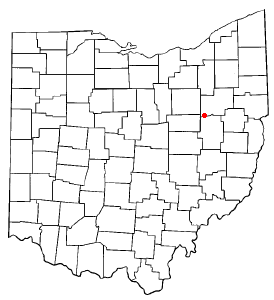
- Location of Beach City, Ohio

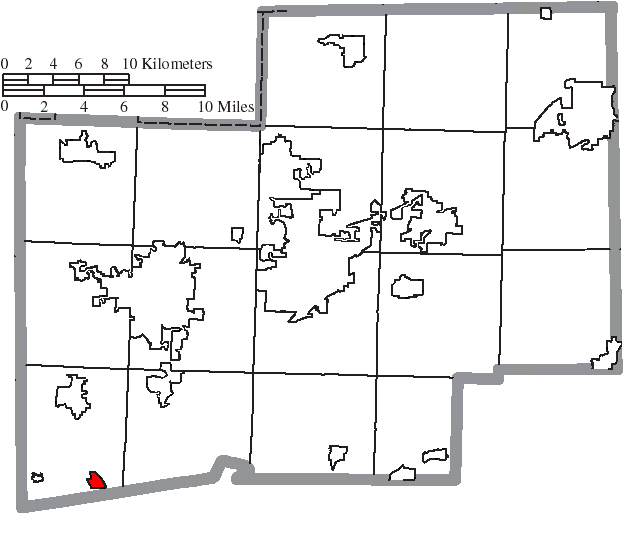
- Location of Beach City in Stark County
- Coordinates: 40°39′11″N 81°34′46″W
- Country: United States
- State: Ohio
- County: Stark
- Township: Sugar Creek

Government
  - Mayor: Mary Beth Yoder

Area
  - Total: 0.43 sq mi (1.11 km^{2})
  - Land: 0.43 sq mi (1.11 km^{2})
  - Water: 0 sq mi (0.00 km^{2})
- Elevation: 1,004 ft (306 m)

Population (2020)
  - Total: 940
  - Estimate (2023): 923
  - Density: 2,195.7/sq mi (847.77/km^{2})
- Time zone: UTC-5 (Eastern (EST))
  - Summer (DST): UTC-4 (EDT)
- ZIP code: 44608
- Area code: 330
- FIPS code: 39-04458
- GNIS feature ID: 2398055
- Website: www.beachcityohio.org

Beach City is a village in southwestern Stark County, Ohio, United States. The population was 940 at the 2020 census. It is part of the Canton–Massillon metropolitan area.

== History ==
Beach City is named after Henry Beach, a railroad official.

A cave known locally as Machan's Rock exists south of Beach City. The site is rumored to be a former Underground Railroad stop. In recent years, the cave and its surrounding rock formations have been covered with graffiti and have purportedly been the site of two accidental deaths since the 1950s.

== Geography ==
Beach City is located along Sugar Creek.

According to the United States Census Bureau, the village has a total area of 0.46 square miles (1.19 km^{2}), all land.

== Demographics ==
Historical population
Census	Pop.	Note	%±
1880	282		—
1900	364		—
1910	671		84.3%
1920	658		−1.9%
1930	725		10.2%
1940	812		12.0%
1950	940		15.8%
1960	1,151		22.4%
1970	1,133		−1.6%
1980	1,083		−4.4%
1990	1,051		−3.0%
2000	1,137		8.2%
2010	1,033		−9.1%
2020	940		−9.0%
2023 (est.)	923	▼	−1.8%
U.S. Decennial Census

=== 2010 census ===
At the 2010 census there were 1,033 people, 419 households, and 284 families living in the village. The population density was 2,245.7 inhabitants per square mile (867.1/km^{2}). There were 457 housing units at an average density of 993.5 per square mile (383.6/km^{2}). The racial makeup of the village was 97.6% White, 0.4% African American, 0.2% Native American, 0.2% from other races, and 1.6% from two or more races. Hispanic or Latino of any race were 0.8%.

Of the 419 households 33.4% had children under the age of 18 living with them, 48.7% were married couples living together, 12.9% had a female householder with no husband present, 6.2% had a male householder with no wife present, and 32.2% were non-families. 27.2% of households were one person and 15.6% were one person aged 65 or older. The average household size was 2.47 and the average family size was 2.99.

The median age in the village was 39.5 years. 23.8% of residents were under the age of 18; 7.9% were between the ages of 18 and 24; 25.8% were from 25 to 44; 26.5% were from 45 to 64; and 16.2% were 65 or older. The gender makeup of the village was 47.9% male and 52.1% female.

=== 2000 census ===
At the 2000 census there were 1,137 people, 456 households, and 311 families living in the village. The population density was 2,454.8 people per square mile (954.3/km^{2}). There were 474 housing units at an average density of 1,023.4 per square mile (395.1/km^{2}). The racial makeup of the village was 98.77% White, 0.09% African American, 0.26% Asian, 0.35% from other races, and 0.53% from two or more races. Hispanic or Latino of any race were 0.88%.

Of the 456 households 31.4% had children under the age of 18 living with them, 55.9% were married couples living together, 8.1% had a female householder with no husband present, and 31.6% were non-families. 27.2% of households were one person and 15.8% had someone living alone who was 65 years of age or older. The average household size was 2.49 and the average family size was 3.04.

The age distribution was 25.9% under the age of 18, 6.7% from 18 to 24, 28.8% from 25 to 44, 21.5% from 45 to 64, and 17.1% who were 65 years of age or older. The median age was 38 years. For every 100 females there were 94.0 males. For every 100 females age 18 and over, there were 89.6 males.

The median household income was $36,250 and the median family income was $41,313. Males had a median income of $32,250 versus $22,045 for females. The per capita income for the village was $15,589. About 5.4% of families and 8.1% of the population were below the poverty line, including 11.4% of those under age 18 and 7.8% of those age 65 or over.

== Notable people ==
- Ralph Regula, congressman
