= National Register of Historic Places listings in Holmes County, Ohio =

Location of Holmes County in Ohio

This is a list of the National Register of Historic Places listings in Holmes County, Ohio.

This is intended to be a complete list of the properties and districts on the National Register of Historic Places in Holmes County, Ohio, United States. The locations of National Register properties and districts for which the latitude and longitude coordinates are included below, may be seen in a Google map.

There are 16 properties and districts listed on the National Register in the county.

This National Park Service list is complete through NPS recent listings posted August 21, 2026.

== Current listings ==
	Name on the Register	Image	Date listed	Location	City or town	Description
1	G. Adams House	G. Adams House	July 17, 1984 (#84003730)	103 N. Clay St. 40°33′21″N 81°55′03″W	Millersburg	
2	Joseph Armstrong Farm	Joseph Armstrong Farm	November 27, 1978 (#78002088)	Southeast of Fredericksburg; 40°39′55″N 81°51′28″W	Salt Creek Township	
3	Boyd School	Boyd School	October 3, 1980 (#80003103)	Northwest of Berlin on County Road 201 (Fryburg-Fredericksburg-Boyd Rd.); 40°34′47″N 81°49′13″W	Berlin Township	
4	Brightman House	Brightman House	October 29, 1974 (#74001528)	Wooster Rd. and Walnut St. 40°33′34″N 81°55′07″W	Millersburg	
5	G. W. Cary House	G. W. Cary House	July 17, 1984 (#84003734)	200 N. Washington St. 40°33′20″N 81°55′05″W	Millersburg	
6	Hiram W. Cary House	Hiram W. Cary House	July 17, 1984 (#84003736)	101 N. Clay St. 40°33′20″N 81°55′03″W	Millersburg	
7	Croco House	Croco House	June 20, 1985 (#85001343)	State Route 83, north of Holmesville; 40°38′10″N 81°55′38″W	Prairie Township	
8	Joseph L. DeYarmon House	Joseph L. DeYarmon House	May 4, 1982 (#82003599)	Southwestern corner of County Road 179 and Township Road 464, southwest of Lakeville; 40°39′10″N 82°08′10″W	Washington Township	
9	Disciple-Christian Church	Disciple-Christian Church	July 17, 1984 (#84003738)	100 N. Clay St. 40°33′20″N 81°55′01″W	Millersburg	
10	Holmes County Courthouse and Jail	Holmes County Courthouse and Jail	July 25, 1974 (#74001529)	Courthouse Sq. 40°33′14″N 81°55′02″W	Millersburg	
11	John E. Koch Jr. House	John E. Koch Jr. House	July 17, 1984 (#84003740)	107 N. Washington St. 40°33′23″N 81°55′07″W	Millersburg	
12	Millersburg Historic District	Millersburg Historic District	July 17, 1984 (#84003743)	Jackson, Clay, and Washington Sts. 40°33′15″N 81°55′05″W	Millersburg	
13	Pomerene House	Pomerene House	October 20, 1980 (#80003102)	U.S. Route 62 in Berlin; 40°33′41″N 81°47′42″W	Berlin Township	
14	Shull-Lugenbuhl Farm	Shull-Lugenbuhl Farm	April 26, 1979 (#79001866)	North of Winesburg; 40°38′04″N 81°41′47″W	Paint Township	
15	United Methodist Church	United Methodist Church	July 17, 1984 (#84003744)	N. Washington St. 40°33′21″N 81°55′08″W	Millersburg	
16	Peter Wise House		April 16, 1980 (#80003104)	South of Berlin on State Route 557; 40°31′52″N 81°48′36″W	Berlin Township	Dismantled in 2008 and pieces scattered among various locations

== See also ==
- List of National Historic Landmarks in Ohio
- Listings in neighboring counties: Ashland, Coshocton, Knox, Stark, Tuscarawas, Wayne
- National Register of Historic Places listings in Ohio
