= Ohio State Route 515 =

State highway in Holmes County, Ohio, US

State Route 515

Route information
- Maintained by ODOT
- Length: 5.51 mi (8.87 km)
- Existed: 1937–present

Major junctions
- South end: SR 39 in Walnut Creek
- North end: US 62 near Winesburg

Location
- Country: United States
- State: Ohio
- Counties: Holmes

Highway system
- Ohio State Highway System; Interstate; US; State; Scenic
← SR 514	→ SR 516

State Route 515 (SR 515) is a north–south state highway located in east-central Ohio. Existing entirely within the northeastern portion of Holmes County in Ohio's Amish Country, SR 515 has its southern terminus at a signalized intersection with SR 39 in the unincorporated community of Walnut Creek. Its northern terminus is at a T-intersection with U.S. Route 62 (US 62) one mile (1.6 km) southwest of the hamlet of Winesburg.

The entirety of SR 515 is a part of the Amish Country Byway, an officially designated National Scenic Byway.

== Route description ==
SR 515 begins its 5.5-mile-long (8.9 km) journey at a signalized intersection with SR 39 in Walnut Creek. SR 515 heads easterly through the heart of this town, passing a number of business that tie in with the local Amish culture, and serve a number of tourists throughout the travel season. At the Walnut Creek Township Highway 444 intersection, SR 515 turns north and enters into rural territory. Passing a small clump of woods before entering into open farmland predominantly composed of Amish farms, the state highway passes Township Highway 406. SR 515 abuts the east side of a forest prior to passing through a northeasterly S-curve, and re-entering a landscape of farmland as it intersects County Road 172 and Township Highway 410 successively. Turning to the northeast, SR 515 next meets County Road 168, then bends back to the north, passing amid a small patch of woods prior to intersecting Township Road 415. After a few twists and turns, SR 515 descends the hill into a little valley and passes through the tiny village of Trail. Named for this section of SR 515 that was once an old Indian trail that ran through the area, and tiny enough to lack a ZIP code, "Troyers Trail Bologna," a regional staple of picnics and potlucks is made in the area. Transitioning back into farmland, SR 515 next passes Township Road 414, and amid a blend of homes, farms and woods, curves to the northwest and then back to the northeast prior to coming to an end at its junction with US 62 at a T-intersection in Paint Township approximately one mile (1.6 km) southwest of the community of Winesburg.

No portion of SR 515 is included within the National Highway System.

== History ==
Designated in 1937 along the path it currently occupies between SR 39 and US 62, SR 515 has not had any significant changes to its routing since its inception.

== Major intersections ==
The entire route is in Holmes County.

Location	mi	km	Destinations	Notes
Walnut Creek Township	0.00	0.00	SR 39 / Township Road 403 – Sugarcreek, Millersburg	
Paint Township	5.51	8.87	US 62 – Millersburg, Winesburg, Wilmot	
1.000 mi = 1.609 km; 1.000 km = 0.621 mi
