= Cary House =

Cary House may refer to:

- Cary House (Pangburn, Arkansas), listed on the National Register of Historic Places (NRHP) in White County
- Joshua B. Cary House, Centerville, Louisiana, listed on the National Register of Historic Places in St. Mary Parish
- Otis Cary House, Foxboro, Massachusetts, listed on the NRHP in Norfolk County
- Stephen Cary House, Mendham, New Jersey, listed on the NRHP in Morris County
- G. W. Cary House, Millersburg, Ohio, listed on the NRHP in Holmes County
- Hiram W. Cary House, Millersburg, Ohio, listed on the NRHP in Holmes County
- Leo J. Cary House, Coquille, Oregon, listed on the NRHP in Coos County
- Lott Cary Birth Site, Charles City, Virginia, listed on the NRHP in Charles City County
- Mary Ann Shadd Cary House, Washington, D.C., a National Historic Landmark and listed on the NRHP
