= Waynedale High School =

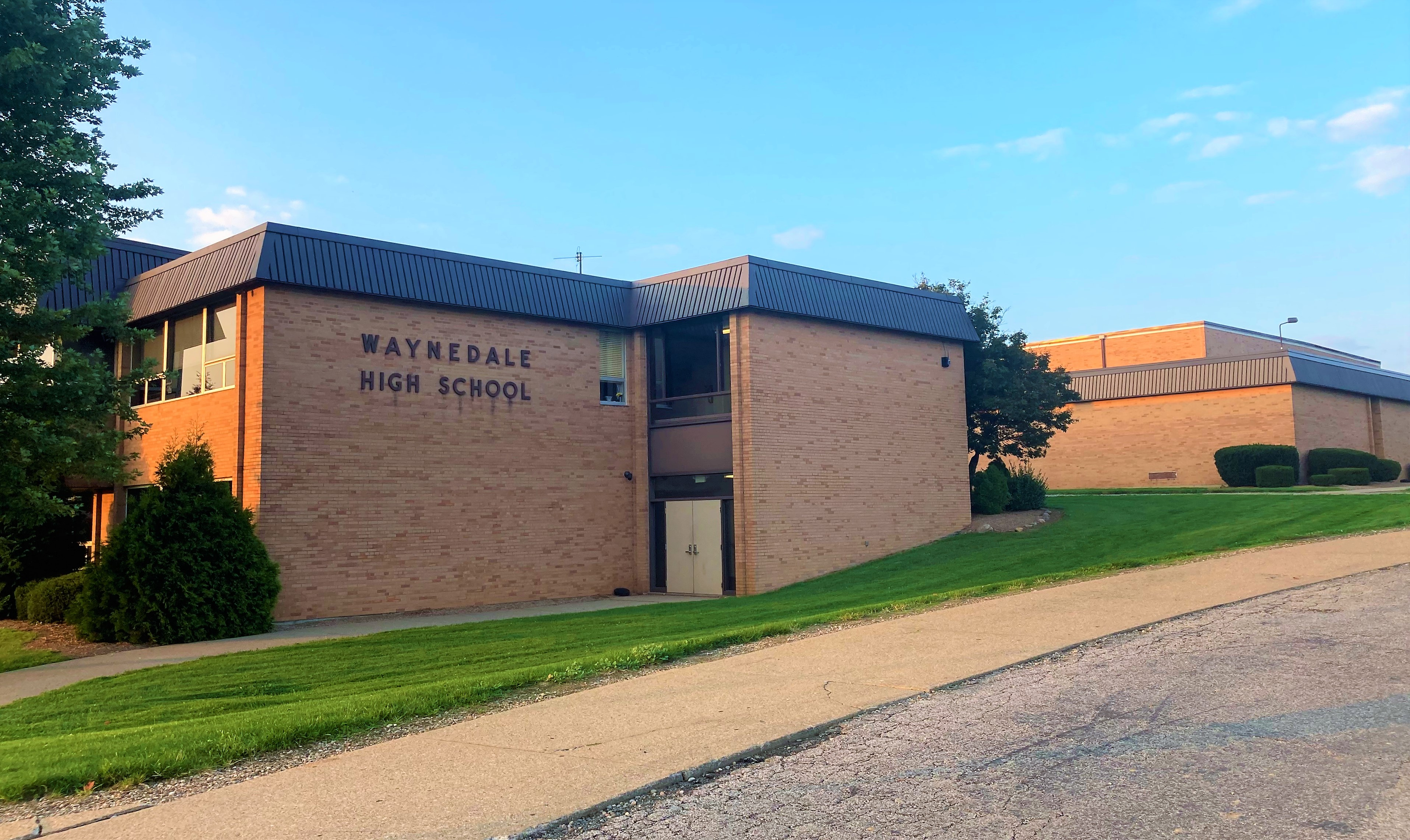

Location
- 9050 Dover Road; Apple Creek, Wayne County, Ohio 44606; United States; 40°44′14″N 81°48′42″W

Information
- Type: Public, Co-Ed
- Established: 1955
- School district: Waynedale Local School District
- Superintendent: Jon Ritchie
- Principal: Richard Roth
- Teaching staff: 23.15 (FTE)
- Grades: 9-12
- Student to teacher ratio: 14.56
- Campus type: Rural
- Colors: Brown and gold
- Athletics conference: Wayne County Athletic League
- Sports: Boys Soccer, Cheerleading, Football, Girls Soccer, Golf, Volleyball, Cross Country, Boys Basketball, Girls Basketball, Wrestling, Baseball, Softball, Track
- Mascot: Golden Bear
- Nickname: Golden Bears
- Rivals: Smithville HS, Dalton HS, Triway HS
- Newspaper: "The Bear Facts"
- Yearbook: "Hill 'N Dale"
- Communities served: Apple Creek, Fredericksburg, Holmesville, Mount Eaton
- Website: https://waynedale.k12.oh.us/

Waynedale High School is a public high school in Apple Creek, Ohio, United States. It is the only high school in the Waynedale Local School District. They are nicknamed the "Golden Bears" and wear the colors of brown and gold for athletic events.

== History ==
Waynedale was created in 1955 during the era when the state of Ohio was consolidating small school districts into larger ones in order to save money. Apple Creek, Fredericksburg, Holmesville, and Mt. Eaton high schools were merged to create Waynedale High School within the Southeast Local School District. They have been members of the Wayne County Athletic League since their creation, as their preceding schools were beforehand. A 20-member committee of coaches, students, and teachers chose the name "Waynedale", as well as the nickname "Bears" over the other choices of "Warriors" and "Wabbits". When the school colors of brown and gold were selected, they decided to go with the nickname of "Golden Bears." The Waynedale student section during athletic events is called the "Bear Den".

== Athletics ==
Waynedale has a strong rivalry with the Triway High School Titans that dates back to when both schools were members of the WCAL from 1955-1970.

=== State championships ===
- Baseball: 2022, 2023, 2025, 2026
- Boys wrestling: 2012
