= Salt Creek Township =

Salt Creek Township may refer to:

== Illinois ==
- Salt Creek Township, Mason County, Illinois

== Indiana ==
- Salt Creek Township, Decatur County, Indiana
- Salt Creek Township, Franklin County, Indiana
- Salt Creek Township, Jackson County, Indiana
- Salt Creek Township, Monroe County, Indiana

== Iowa ==
- Salt Creek Township, Davis County, Iowa
- Salt Creek Township, Tama County, Iowa

== Kansas ==
- Salt Creek Township, Chautauqua County, Kansas
- Salt Creek Township, Lincoln County, Kansas, in Lincoln County, Kansas
- Salt Creek Township, Mitchell County, Kansas, in Mitchell County, Kansas
- Salt Creek Township, Reno County, Kansas, in Reno County, Kansas

== Missouri ==
- Salt Creek Township, Chariton County, Missouri

== Ohio ==
- Salt Creek Township, Hocking County, Ohio
- Salt Creek Township, Holmes County, Ohio
- Salt Creek Township, Muskingum County, Ohio
- Salt Creek Township, Pickaway County, Ohio
- Salt Creek Township, Wayne County, Ohio
