= Walnut Creek, Ohio =

- Census-designated place
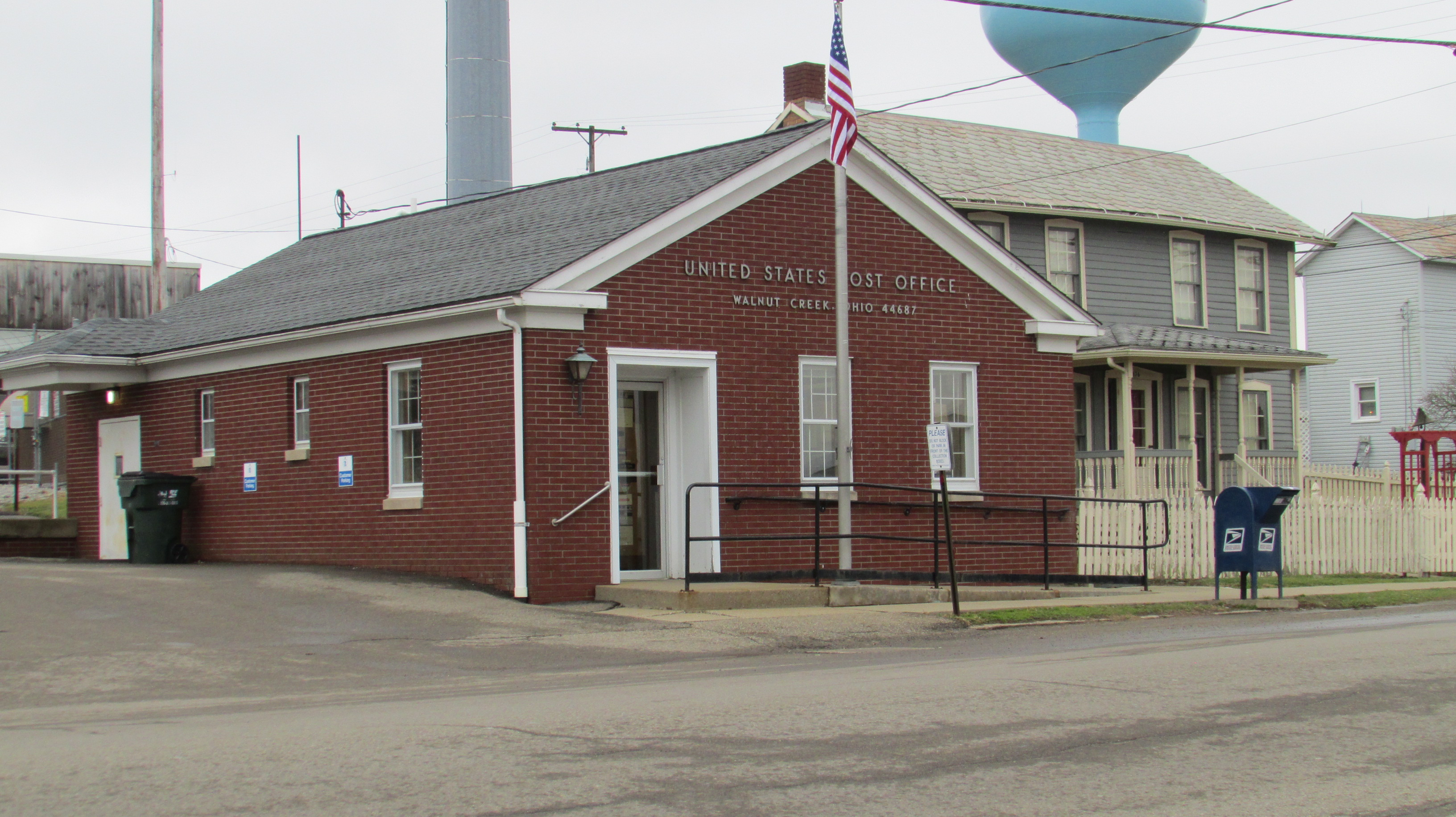
- US Post Office in Walnut Creek

- Location within Ohio Location within the United States
- Coordinates: 40°32′41″N 81°44′25″W
- Country: United States
- State: Ohio
- County: Holmes
- Township: Walnut Creek

Area
  - Total: 2.22 sq mi (5.76 km^{2})
  - Land: 2.22 sq mi (5.76 km^{2})
  - Water: 0 sq mi (0.00 km^{2})
- Elevation: 1,106 ft (337 m)

Population (2020)
  - Total: 908
  - Density: 408.4/sq mi (157.68/km^{2})
- Time zone: UTC-5 (Eastern (EST))
  - Summer (DST): UTC-4 (EDT)
- ZIP code: 44687
- Area code: 330
- FIPS code: 39-80612
- GNIS feature ID: 2628984

Walnut Creek is an unincorporated community and census-designated place in central Walnut Creek Township, Holmes County, Ohio, United States. It had a population of 908 at the 2020 census. Located in Ohio's Amish Country, Walnut Creek is a popular location for tourists.

== History ==
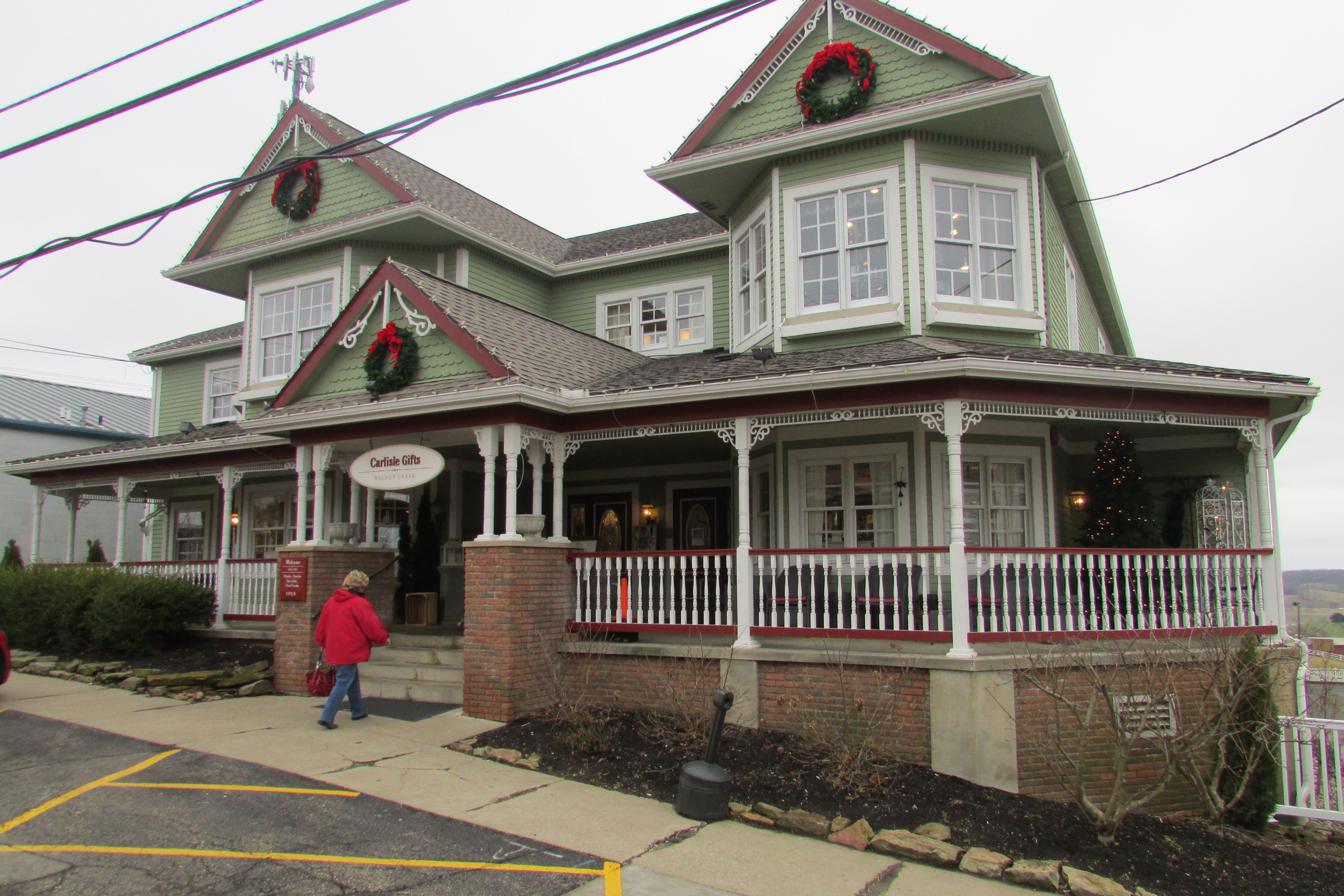
Carlisle Gifts is part of the Amish tourism industry in Walnut Creek

Walnut Creek was laid out in 1826. Originally named New Carlisle, the village was renamed to Walnut Creek when the post office was established in 1841.

Beginning in the 1990s business leaders developed Walnut Creek into an American-Victorian themed town, which the University of Dayton's Susan Trollinger calls "puzzling" because of the stark contrast between Victorian overdecorating and the Amish plainness. Tourist-oriented businesses typically include "resting places" such as parlors in hotels or wrapround porches lined with rocking chairs or other seating on retail shops, which emphasizes a sense of having plentiful time. Her conclusion is that the Victorian theme and emphasis on resting places is capitalizing on the attraction of nostalgia for a simpler life with plentiful time, which it has in common with the Amish. Large parking lots and sidewalks connect the business district, which is condensed into six square blocks and connected by wide sidewalks, further encouraging a feeling of a slower-pace and life lived on foot. American flags and other patriotic-themed decor are commonly displayed in both exterior and interior spaces, which Trollinger again finds interesting when contrasted to the Amish, who refuse to recite the Pledge of Allegiance and do not fly flags at their schools and homes.

== Geography ==
Walnut Creek is in eastern Holmes County, sitting atop a 200-foot-high (61 m) ridge between Goose Creek to the north and Walnut Creek to the south. It is part of the Tuscarawas River watershed.

It lies at the intersection of State Routes 39 and 515. Route 39 leads west 11 miles (18 km) to Millersburg, the Holmes county seat, and east 17 miles (27 km) to New Philadelphia, while Route 515 leads north 6 miles (10 km) to Winesburg.

According to the U.S. Census Bureau, the Walnut Creek CDP has a total area of 2.2 square miles (5.8 km^{2}), of which 1.1 acres (4,467 m^{2}), or 0.08%, are water.

== Demographics ==
Historical population
Census	Pop.	Note	%±
2010	878		—
2020	908		3.4%
U.S. Decennial Census

== Education ==
East Holmes Local Schools operates Walnut Creek Elementary School in the community.

Walnut Creek has a public library, a branch of the Holmes County District Public Library.
