= Salt Creek Township, Ohio =

Salt Creek Township, Ohio may refer to:

- Salt Creek Township, Hocking County, Ohio
- Salt Creek Township, Holmes County, Ohio
- Salt Creek Township, Muskingum County, Ohio
- Salt Creek Township, Pickaway County, Ohio
- Salt Creek Township, Wayne County, Ohio

== See also ==
- Salt Creek Township (disambiguation)
