= Winesburg =

Winesburg may refer to:

- Winesburg, Ohio, a 1919 book by Sherwood Anderson
- Winesburg, Holmes County, Ohio, an unincorporated community
- Winesburg College, the fictional setting for Philip Roth's 2008 novel Indignation

== See also ==
- Weinsberg, a town in Germany
