= Fredericksburg, Ohio =

- Village
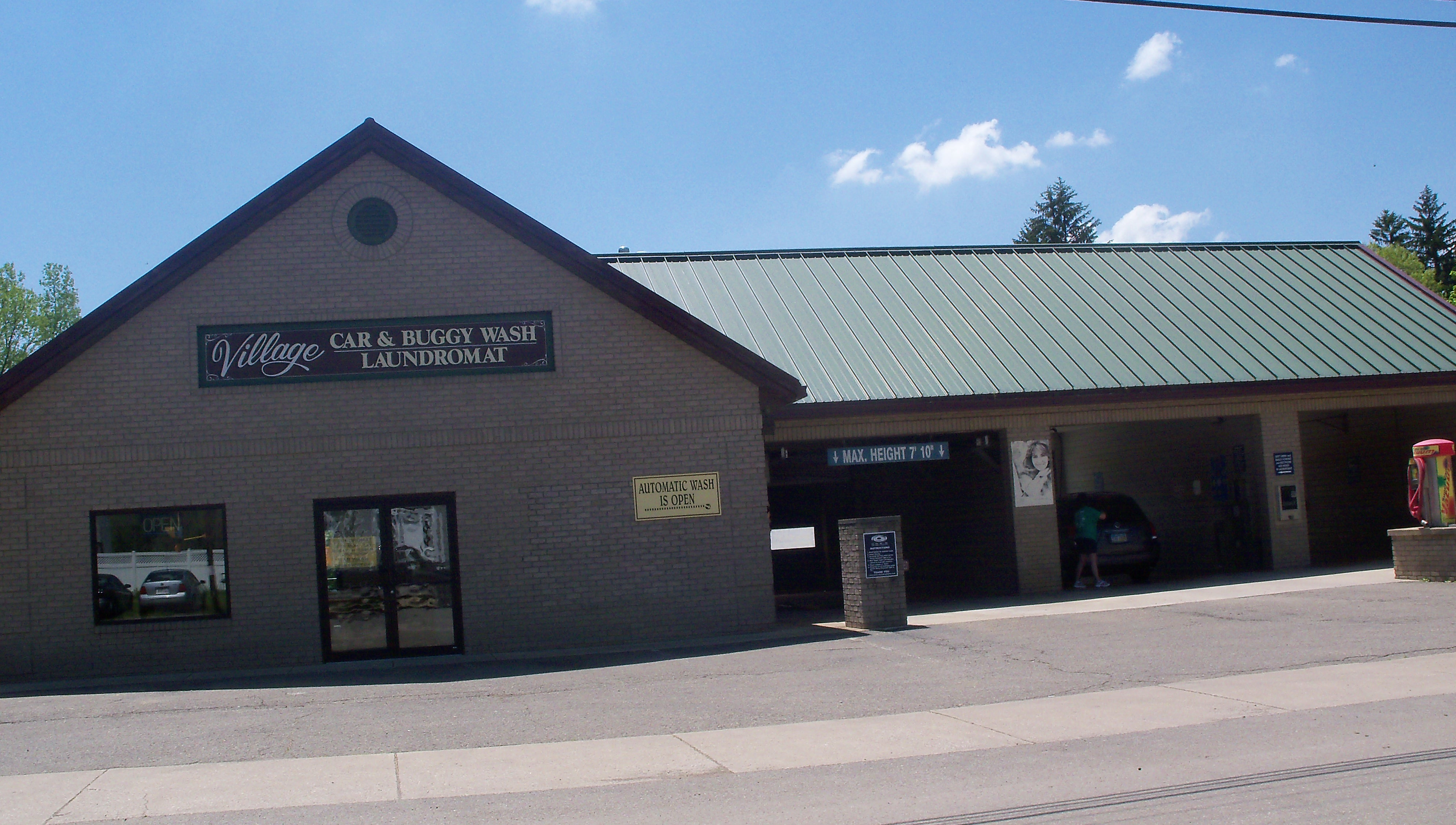
- Amish buggies, cars and clothes can be washed at this business

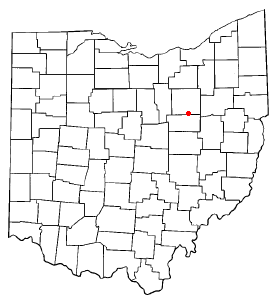
- Location of Fredericksburg, Ohio

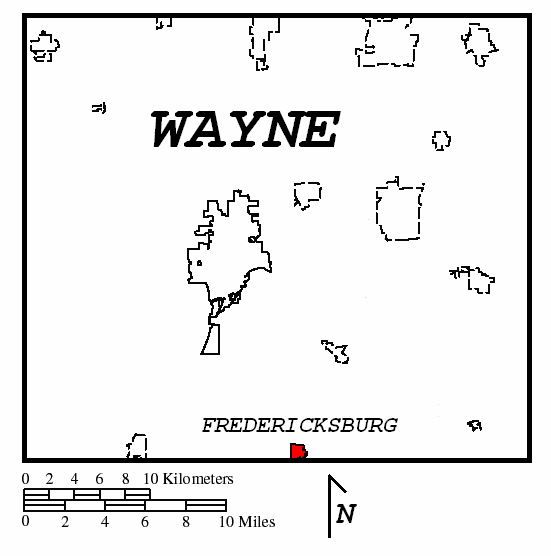
- Location within Wayne County
- Coordinates: 40°40′38″N 81°52′21″W
- Country: United States
- State: Ohio
- County: Wayne
- Township: Salt Creek

Area
  - Total: 0.32 sq mi (0.84 km^{2})
  - Land: 0.32 sq mi (0.84 km^{2})
  - Water: 0 sq mi (0.00 km^{2})
- Elevation: 981 ft (299 m)

Population (2020)
  - Total: 409
  - Estimate (2023): 405
  - Density: 1,267.1/sq mi (489.22/km^{2})
- Time zone: UTC-5 (Eastern (EST))
  - Summer (DST): UTC-4 (EDT)
- ZIP code: 44627
- Area code: 330
- FIPS code: 39-28616
- GNIS feature ID: 2398921
- Website: fredericksburgohio.org

Fredericksburg is a village in Salt Creek Township, Wayne County, Ohio, United States. The population was 409 at the 2020 census.

== History ==
Fredericksburg was platted in 1824 by Jacob Frederick, and named for him.

== Geography ==
According to the United States Census Bureau, the village has a total area of 0.34 square miles (0.88 km^{2}), all of it land.

== Demographics ==
Historical population
Census	Pop.	Note	%±
1850	573		—
1860	590		3.0%
1870	539		−8.6%
1880	550		2.0%
1890	600		9.1%
1900	511		−14.8%
1910	507		−0.8%
1920	480		−5.3%
1930	483		0.6%
1940	485		0.4%
1950	517		6.6%
1960	565		9.3%
1970	601		6.4%
1980	511		−15.0%
1990	502		−1.8%
2000	487		−3.0%
2010	423		−13.1%
2020	409		−3.3%
2023 (est.)	405	▼	−1.0%
U.S. Decennial Census

=== 2010 census ===
As of the census of 2010, there were 423 people, 177 households, and 116 families living in the village. The population density was 1,244.1 inhabitants per square mile (480.3/km^{2}). There were 192 housing units at an average density of 564.7 per square mile (218.0/km^{2}). The racial makeup of the village was 99.3% White, 0.5% Asian, and 0.2% from two or more races. Hispanic or Latino of any race were 1.2% of the population.

There were 177 households, of which 31.1% had children under the age of 18 living with them, 54.2% were married couples living together, 9.0% had a female householder with no husband present, 2.3% had a male householder with no wife present, and 34.5% were non-families. 29.9% of all households were made up of individuals, and 13.5% had someone living alone who was 65 years of age or older. The average household size was 2.37 and the average family size was 2.97.

The median age in the village was 33.8 years. 24.1% of residents were under the age of 18; 9% were between the ages of 18 and 24; 28.8% were from 25 to 44; 22.9% were from 45 to 64; and 15.1% were 65 years of age or older. The gender makeup of the village was 49.4% male and 50.6% female.

=== 2000 census ===
As of the census of 2000, there were 487 people, 184 households, and 128 families living in the village. The population density was 1,474.6 inhabitants per square mile (569.3/km^{2}). There were 189 housing units at an average density of 572.3 per square mile (221.0/km^{2}). The racial makeup of the village was 97.95% White, and 2.05% from two or more races. Hispanic or Latino of any race were 0.21% of the population.

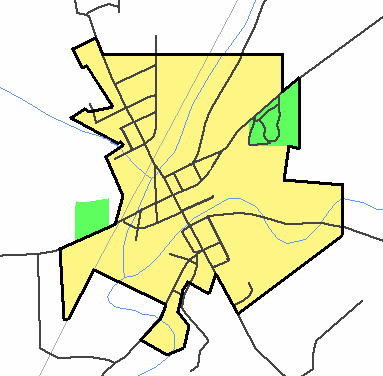
Detailed map of Fredericksburg, Ohio

There were 184 households, out of which 34.8% had children under the age of 18 living with them, 57.1% were married couples living together, 8.7% had a female householder with no husband present, and 29.9% were non-families. 26.6% of all households were made up of individuals, and 13.0% had someone living alone who was 65 years of age or older. The average household size was 2.63 and the average family size was 3.21.

In the village, the population was spread out, with 28.7% under the age of 18, 9.2% from 18 to 24, 26.9% from 25 to 44, 21.4% from 45 to 64, and 13.8% who were 65 years of age or older. The median age was 36 years. For every 100 females there were 98.8 males. For every 100 females age 18 and over, there were 91.7 males.

The median income for a household in the village was $32,500, and the median income for a family was $40,156. Males had a median income of $30,179 versus $19,861 for females. The per capita income for the village was $11,690. About 4.8% of families and 7.9% of the population were below the poverty line, including 10.1% of those under age 18 and none of those age 65 or over.

== Economy ==
Fredericksburg is home to two large factories, Mrs. Miller's Homemade Noodles and Robin Industries. Mrs. Miller's Homemade Noodles specializes in various kinds of pasta as well as jams and jellies distributed throughout the United States. Robin Industries makes rubber and plastic parts for automobiles under contract of General Motors. Fredericksburg is also home to a national hardware store and bank, two restaurants, construction company, carpet store, library, three churches, and many more smaller businesses. Local residents are served by the South Central Fire District's volunteer fire department.

== Education ==
Fredericksburg is part of the Waynedale Local School District, which includes the villages of Apple Creek and Mount Eaton in Wayne County, and the village of Holmesville in Holmes County.

Fredericksburg students attend Waynedale Elementary from K to 5, Waynedale Middle School for grades 6 to 8, and finish up their curriculum at Waynedale High School for grades 9 to 12.

The old Fredericksburg School was built in 1891 at a cost of $20,000, and served as the primary high school for the Salt Creek Local School District until the consolidation with Paint Local, and East Union Local School Districts in Wayne County, and Prairie Local School District in Holmes County combined to form the Southeast Local School District, in 1955 upon completion of Waynedale High School. Fredericksburg High athletic teams were known as the "Freddies," and won multiple championships in basketball and baseball in the now defunct Wayne County "B" League, despite being one of the smallest school's competing.

The old school building was added onto multiple times: In 1923 a gym, auditorium and classroom space were added, in 1941 a Farm Shop was added to the west side of the building, in 1967 two rooms were added, and in 1989 with the addition of three more classrooms and two restrooms.

== Notable residents ==
- Brand Blanshard, American philosopher
- Paul Blanshard, American author, lawyer, socialist, secular humanist, and assistant editor of The Nation magazine
- Isaac Singer, inventor, lived about a year in Fredericksburg making wooden type for printers, and improved a type-making machine. Later he founded the Singer Sewing Machine Company.
