= Millersburg Historic District =

Millersburg Historic District may refer to:

- Millersburg Historic District (Millersburg, Kentucky), listed on the National Register of Historic Places in Bourbon County, Kentucky
- Millersburg Historic District (Millersburg, Ohio), listed on the National Register of Historic Places in Holmes County, Ohio
