= Prairie Township, Ohio =

Prairie Township, Ohio may refer to:

- Prairie Township, Franklin County, Ohio
- Prairie Township, Holmes County, Ohio
