= Croco House =

- U.S. National Register of Historic Places
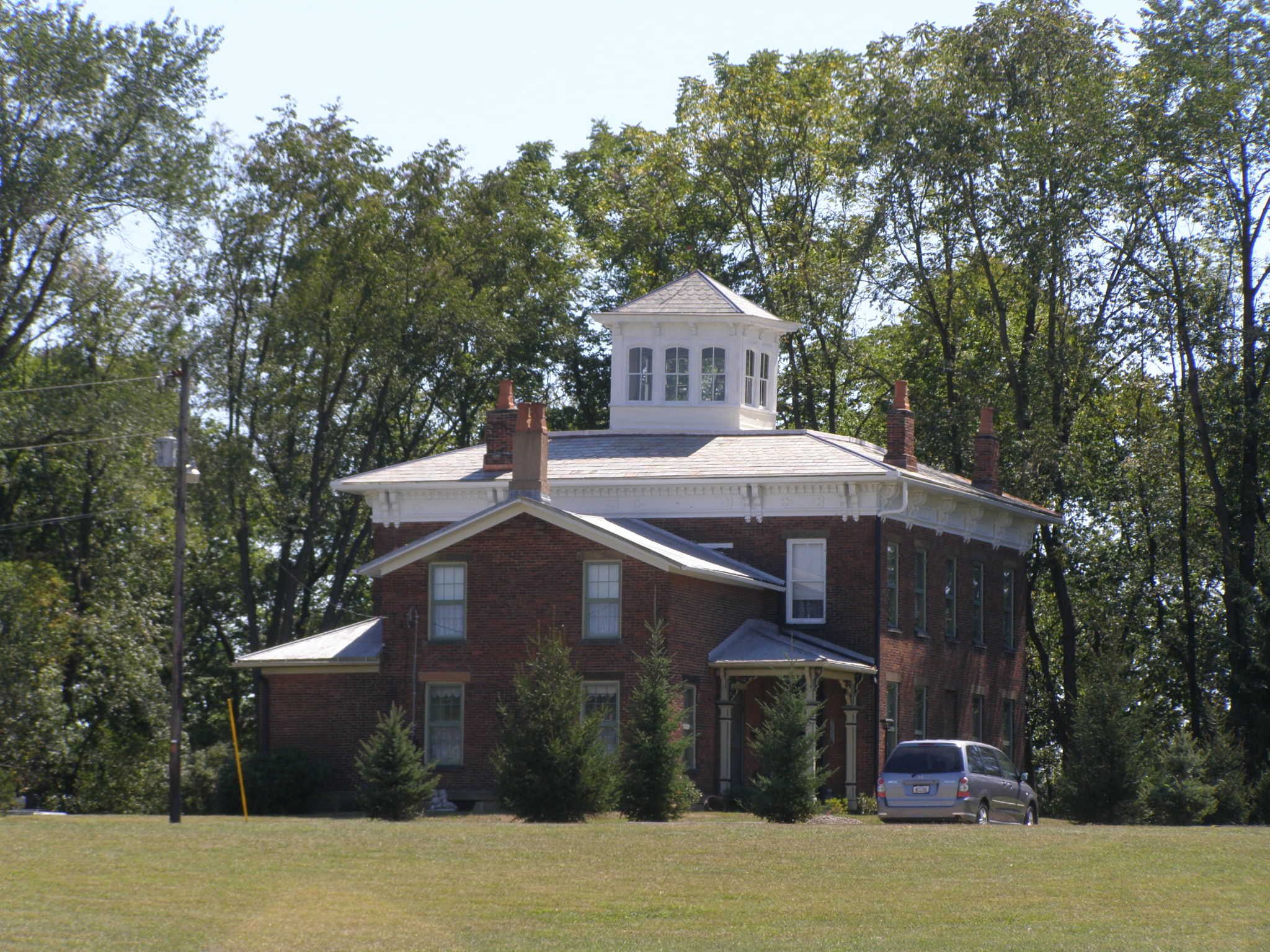
- Croco House, Holmes County, Ohio

- Location within Ohio Location within the United States
- Nearest city: Holmesville, Ohio
- Coordinates: 40°38′10″N 81°55′38″W
- Area: 4.2 acres (1.7 ha)
- Built: 1873
- Architectural style: Italianate
- NRHP reference No.: 85001343
- Added to NRHP: June 20, 1985

The Keifer Croco farm was a stop along the Underground Railroad. This was a parallel route to Wooster east of the route through modern Shreve. Along with the John Croco farm, next door, served as waystations and hiding places for slaves moving northward, prior to the American Civil War. From here, the escapee would be transported to Thomas Smiths farm. Smith would then forward them to Isaac Daniel directly or via Daniel Clark in Apple Creek. The attic was designed to hide escaping slaves. A trap door was hidden in the ceiling provided access. The John Croco barn, a half-mile away had a cellar, where runaways could be sheltered. Bill and Rosanna Painter purchased and restored the Croco house around 2001. In 2018, the house was purchased by Craig and Gwen Zimmerly, where they continue to live with their three daughters.

   ref name=Stallman/>(pg 105)
