= Berlin Township, Holmes County, Ohio =

Township in Ohio, US

- Township
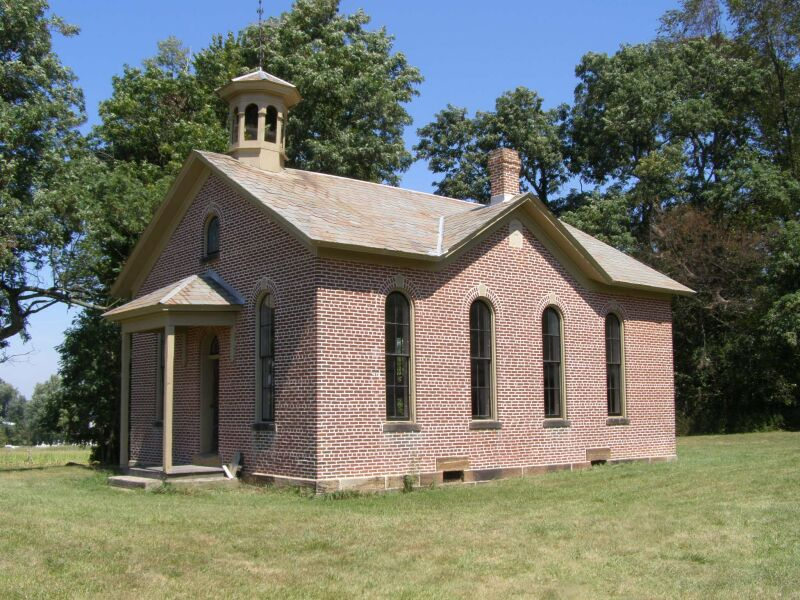
- Boyd School, built 1889

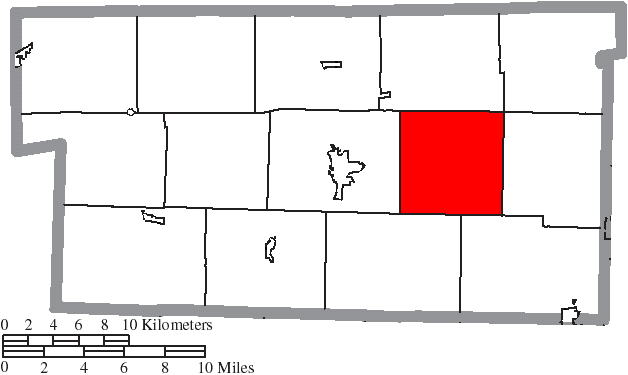
- Location of Berlin Township in Holmes County
- Coordinates: 40°33′39″N 81°48′42″W
- Country: United States
- State: Ohio
- County: Holmes

Area
  - Total: 26.1 sq mi (67.6 km^{2})
  - Land: 26.0 sq mi (67.4 km^{2})
  - Water: 0.077 sq mi (0.2 km^{2})
- Elevation: 1,119 ft (341 m)

Population (2020)
  - Total: 4,546
  - Density: 175/sq mi (67.4/km^{2})
- Time zone: UTC-5 (Eastern (EST))
  - Summer (DST): UTC-4 (EDT)
- ZIP code: 44610
- Area code: 330
- FIPS code: 39-05830
- GNIS feature ID: 1086327
- Website: https://www.berlintownshipohio.com/

Berlin Township is one of the fourteen townships of Holmes County, Ohio, United States. It is at the heart of the Holmes County Amish settlement. As of the 2020 census the population of the township was 4,546, up from 4,252 at the 2010 census.

== Geography ==
Located in the east central part of the county, it borders the following townships:

- Salt Creek Township - north
- Paint Township - northeast corner
- Walnut Creek Township - east
- Clark Township - southeast
- Mechanic Township - southwest
- Hardy Township - west

No municipalities are located in Berlin Township, although the census-designated place of Berlin lies at the center of the township.

== Name and history ==
Berlin Township was organized March 20, 1820 prior to the formation of Holmes County which occurred January 20, 1824. It therefore began as a township of Coshocton County. The original township included all of the present day Berlin Township plus the part of the present day Walnut Creek Township that was then in Coshocton County as well as the parts of the present day Salt Creek and Paint Townships north of these areas and south of the Greenville Treaty Line.

Statewide, other Berlin Townships are located in Delaware, Erie, Knox, and Mahoning counties.

== Important and historic sites ==
A major attraction for visitors is the Amish & Mennonite Heritage Center providing a glimpse of the traditional ways of the Amish and an illustrated history in its extensively large mural called Behalt.

== Government ==
The township is governed by a three-member board of trustees, who are elected in November of odd-numbered years to a four-year term beginning on the following January 1. Two are elected in the year after the presidential election and one is elected in the year before it. There is also an elected township fiscal officer, who serves a four-year term beginning on April 1 of the year after the election, which is held in November of the year before the presidential election. Vacancies in the fiscal officership or on the board of trustees are filled by the remaining trustees.

== Demographics ==
Historical population
Census	Pop.	Note	%±
1990	3,457		—
2000	3,841		11.1%
2010	4,252		10.7%
2020	4,546		6.9%
2024 (est.)	4,646		2.2%
US Census:

As of 2011–15, 38.9% of the population spoke only English, 48.1% spoke Pennsylvania German at home, and 12.3% spoke German. According to the 2019 "ACS 5-Year Estimates Data Profiles", the percentage of English only speakers decreased to 35.7%, while speakers of "other Indo-European languages" (basically Pennsylvania Dutch/German), increased to 64.0% of the township's population.
