= Franklin Township, Wayne County, Ohio =

Township in Ohio, US

- Township
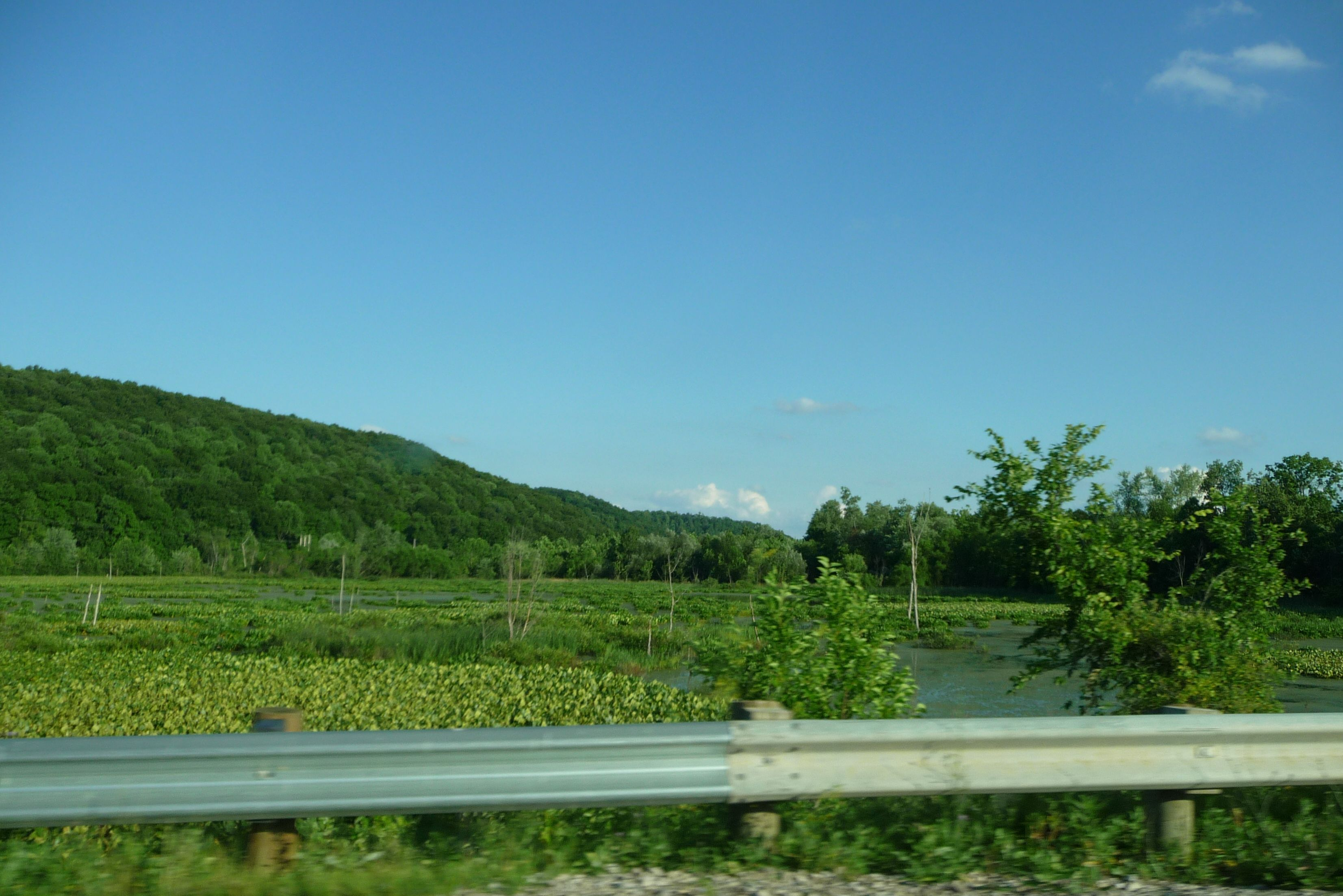
- The Killbuck Swamp, east of Shreve

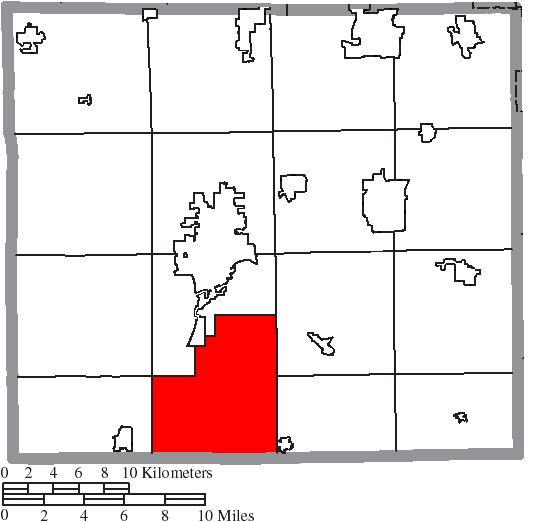
- Location of Franklin Township in Wayne County
- Coordinates: 40°42′45″N 81°56′7″W
- Country: United States
- State: Ohio
- County: Wayne

Area
  - Total: 36.2 sq mi (93.7 km^{2})
  - Land: 36.1 sq mi (93.4 km^{2})
  - Water: 0.12 sq mi (0.3 km^{2})
- Elevation: 1,138 ft (347 m)

Population (2020)
  - Total: 4,235
  - Density: 117/sq mi (45.3/km^{2})
- Time zone: UTC-5 (Eastern (EST))
  - Summer (DST): UTC-4 (EDT)
- FIPS code: 39-28504
- GNIS feature ID: 1087155
- Website: https://franklintwp-wayne.com/

Historical population
| Census | Pop. | Note | %± |
|---|---|---|---|
| 1990 | 2,747 | | — |
| 2000 | 3,485 | | 26.9% |
| 2010 | 3,872 | | 11.1% |
| 2020 | 4,235 | | 9.4% |
US Census:

Franklin Township is one of the sixteen townships of Wayne County, Ohio, United States. The 2020 census found 4,235 people in the township.

== Geography ==
Located in the southern part of the county, it borders the following townships:

- Wooster Township - north
- East Union Township - northeast
- Salt Creek Township - east
- Salt Creek Township, Holmes County - southeast corner
- Prairie Township, Holmes County - south
- Ripley Township, Holmes County - southwest corner
- Clinton Township - west
- Plain Township - northwest corner

No municipalities are located in Franklin Township.

== Name and history ==
It is one of twenty-one Franklin Townships statewide.

== Government ==
The township is governed by a three-member board of trustees, who are elected in November of odd-numbered years to a four-year term beginning on the following January 1. Two are elected in the year after the presidential election and one is elected in the year before it. There is also an elected township fiscal officer, who serves a four-year term beginning on April 1 of the year after the election, which is held in November of the year before the presidential election. Vacancies in the fiscal officership or on the board of trustees are filled by the remaining trustees.
