= Joseph Armstrong Farm =

United States historic place

Coordinates: 40°39′55″N 81°51′28″W

- U.S. National Register of Historic Places
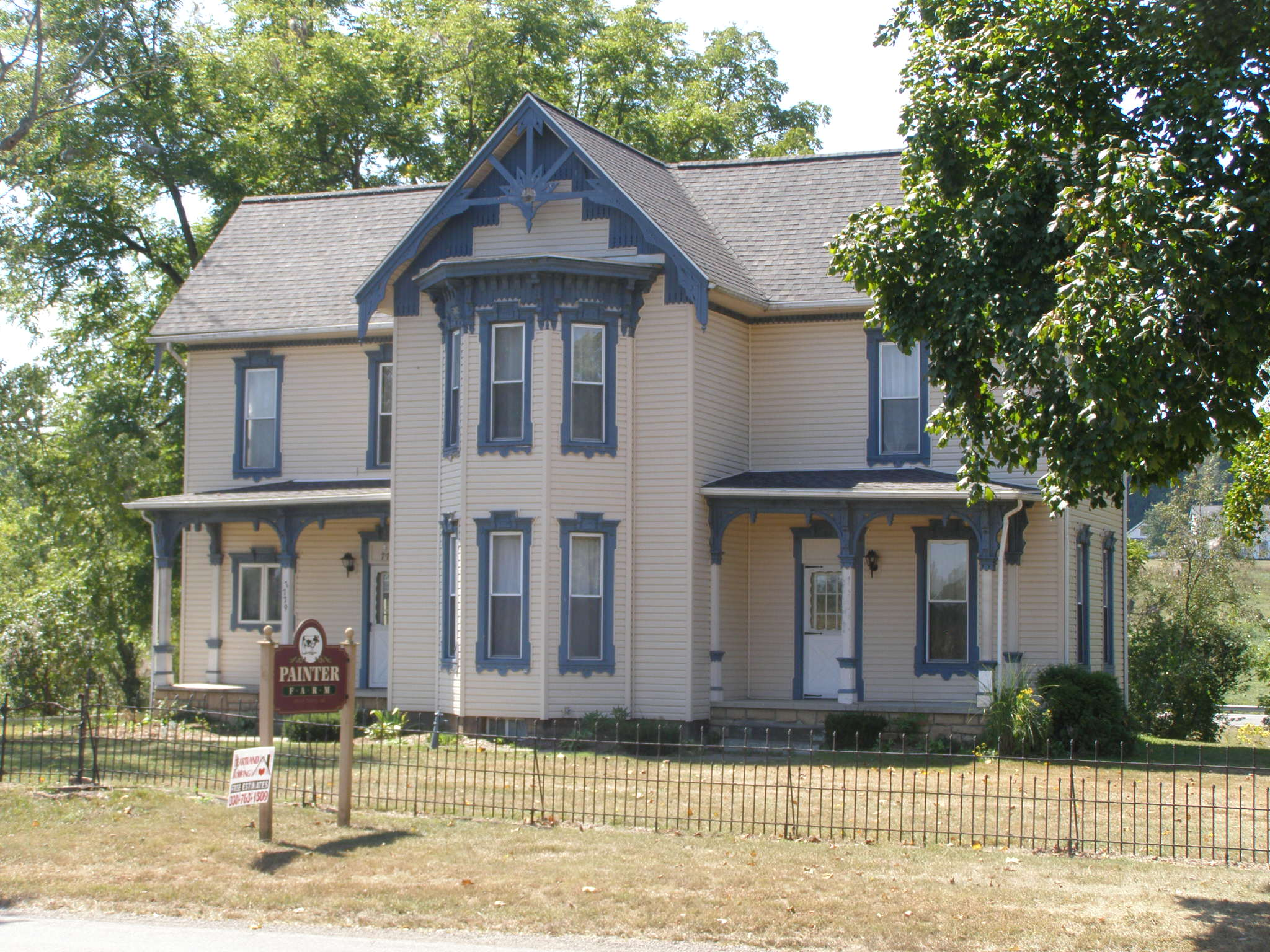
- Nearest city: Fredericksburg, Ohio
- NRHP reference No.: 78002088
- Added to NRHP: 1978-11-27

Joseph Armstrong Farm is a registered historic building near Fredericksburg, Ohio, listed in the National Register on 1978-11-27.

== Historic uses ==
- Single Dwelling
- Agricultural Outbuildings
