= Millersburg Christian Church =

Historic church in Ohio, United States

- Disciple-Christian Church
- U.S. National Register of Historic Places
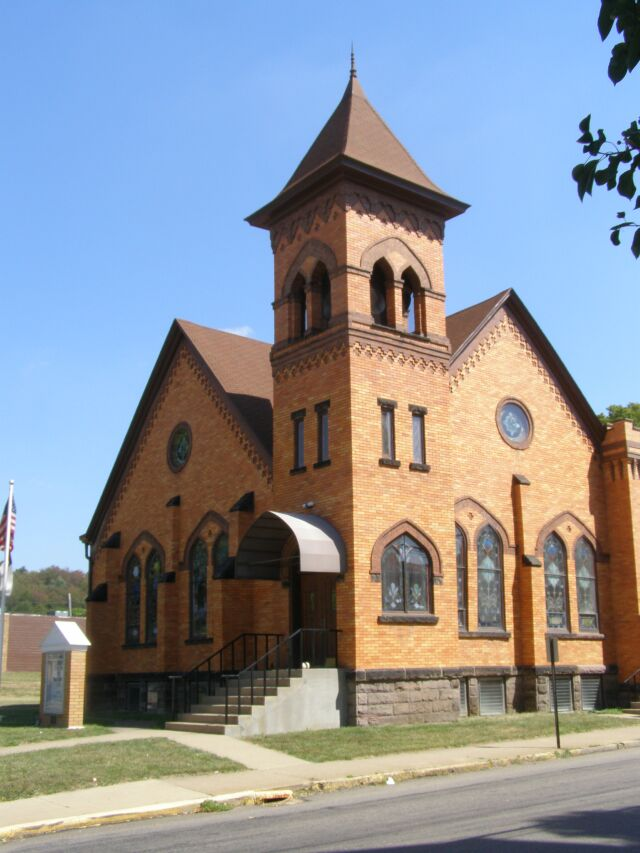

- Location within Ohio Location within the United States
- Location: 100 N. Clay St., Millersburg, Ohio
- Coordinates: 40°33′20″N 81°55′1″W
- Area: less than one acre
- Built: 1903
- Architectural style: Gothic
- MPS: Millersburg MRA
- NRHP reference No.: 84003738
- Added to NRHP: July 17, 1984

Millersburg Christian Church is a historic Disciples of Christ church at 100 North Clay Street in Millersburg, Ohio. The earliest Christian Church was a frame structure built on this site in 1859. The brick building was constructed during 1903–04.

The lot on which the new building stands (No. 47) was deeded by Jacob and Mary Bodenheimer to John Albertson, Jacob Vorhes, and William Courtney as trustees of the Disciple church and their successors in office forever, in December, 1852 and was recorded August 4, 1853. The consideration was $330.00.

The first wood-frame building was built in 1858, possibly 1859 and used until 1890 when it was completely remodeled and was dedicated on January 11, 1891.

The present structure was begun in 1903, completed in 1904, and dedicated on August 21, 1904. It was later added to the National Register of Historic Places in 1984.

The total cost of the structure was $8433.18. Of this amount the sum of $4862.37 was raised previous to the dedication on August 21, 1904, leaving a balance of $3570.81. On Sunday, August 14, 1904, about $3700 was raised which freed the church from debt and placed the congregation on a solid financial footing.

An early 20th century Victorian Gothic design in polychromatic tan brick. Built on an L-shaped layout, three bays wide and six deep. The exterior is accented with dark brownstone sills, brick hood moulds and a corbelled cornice. The walls are pierced by paired stained glass windows with buttresses. On the southwest corner is the main entrance under the bell tower, which is topped with a pyramidal roof.

The Christian church of Millersburg, Ohio, was organized in 1852, and from the old records of the church the following regarding the organization is taken:

“At a meeting of the members of the church styled Disciples of Christ, held in the court house in the town of Millersburg, in the county of Holmes and State of Ohio, on Monday, the 26th day of April, A. D. 1852, at 10 o’clock a. m. for the purpose of organizing a church in said town of Millersburg, the following proceedings were then and there had:

After a short discourse by Rev. John Erret, a preacher of said denomination, on a vote taken by said members; it was agreed that a church to be styled the “Church of Disciples of Christ” at the town of Millersburg, be organized, whereupon said members elected John Albertson as elder of said church and Jacob Vorhes and William J. Courtney as deacons; Malvina Wolgamot and Sarah Mayers as deaconesses and Samuel Appleton as clerk; and the following persons being present and known to be in good standing in said church are enrolled as the members of said organized church:

John Albertson,	Jacob Vorhes,	Sarah Mayers,
William J. Courtney,	Malvina Wolgamot,	Samuel Appleton,
Thomas Randolph,	Albert H. Force,	Aaron Keller,
James Barton,	Penelope French,	Rachel Keller,
Charlotte Barton,	Matilda Stull,	Mary Ann Teisher,
Eleanor Cherryholmes,	Margaret Hart,	Elizabeth J. Vorhes,
Susanna Wolgamot,	Mary Vorhes.	

And thereupon said church being duly organized in pursuance to the authority of the new testament as believed and taught by said denomination, the Rev. John Erret invoked the blessing of God and the meeting adjourned”

The next meeting was held May 1, 1852, at the house of David Wolgamot in Millersburg at which time John Albertson, Jacob Vorhes and William J. Courtney were elected Trustees and the clerk was ordered under an act of the legislature passed in 1844 to certify all the proceedings of said organization to the county Recorder for record. Meetings were held at various places afterwards and on May 31, 1857, the organization took under consideration the matter of building a church edifice, which was unanimously adopted. The records do not show when the first building was completed, but our best information is that it was in 1858 – possibly 1859.

The building was demolished in April 2024 due to rising costs in maintenance.
