= Pomerene House =

- U.S. National Register of Historic Places
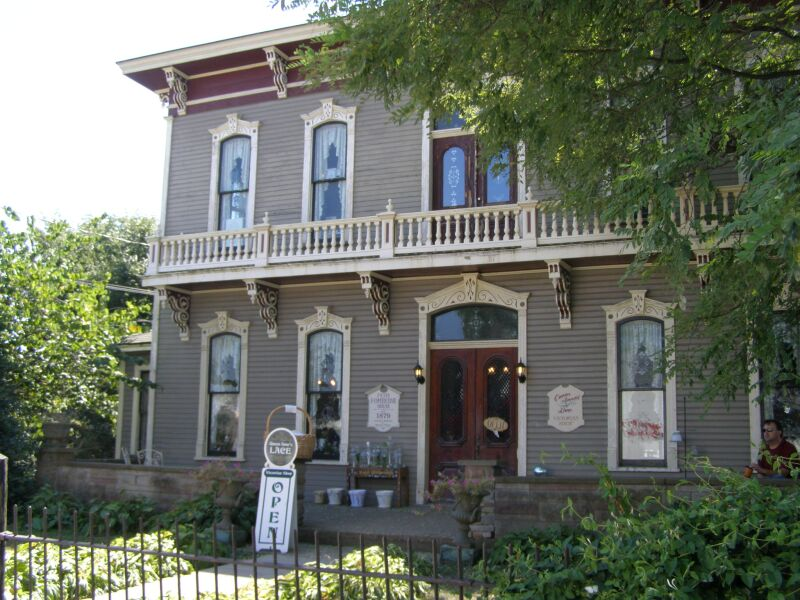
- Pomerene House, Berlin, Holmes County, Ohio

- Location within Ohio Location within the United States
- Location: U.S. Route 62, Berlin, Ohio
- Coordinates: 40°33′40″N 81°47′41″W
- Area: less than one acre
- Built: 1879
- Architectural style: Queen Anne
- NRHP reference No.: 80003102
- Added to NRHP: October 20, 1980

The Pomerene House is the residence of Atlee Pomerene, United States Senator from Ohio in the early 20th century. President Calvin Coolidge appointed Senator Pomerene as one of two individuals to investigate the Teapot Dome scandal of the Harding Administration. He was one of the two primary sponsors of the Webb-Pomerene Act of 1918, regulating American investments overseas. During the 1928 Democratic National Convention, his name was placed before the convention as a potential presidential candidate.

The house was built in 1879 in an Italianate style. It is rectangular with a brick façade over a wood frame. The north face is symmetrical with the front door centered under an arched transom.

== See also ==
- The NAEWS & Pomerene Lab of the Ohio Agricultural Research and Development Center
