= Salt Creek Township, Holmes County, Ohio =

Township in Ohio, US

- Township
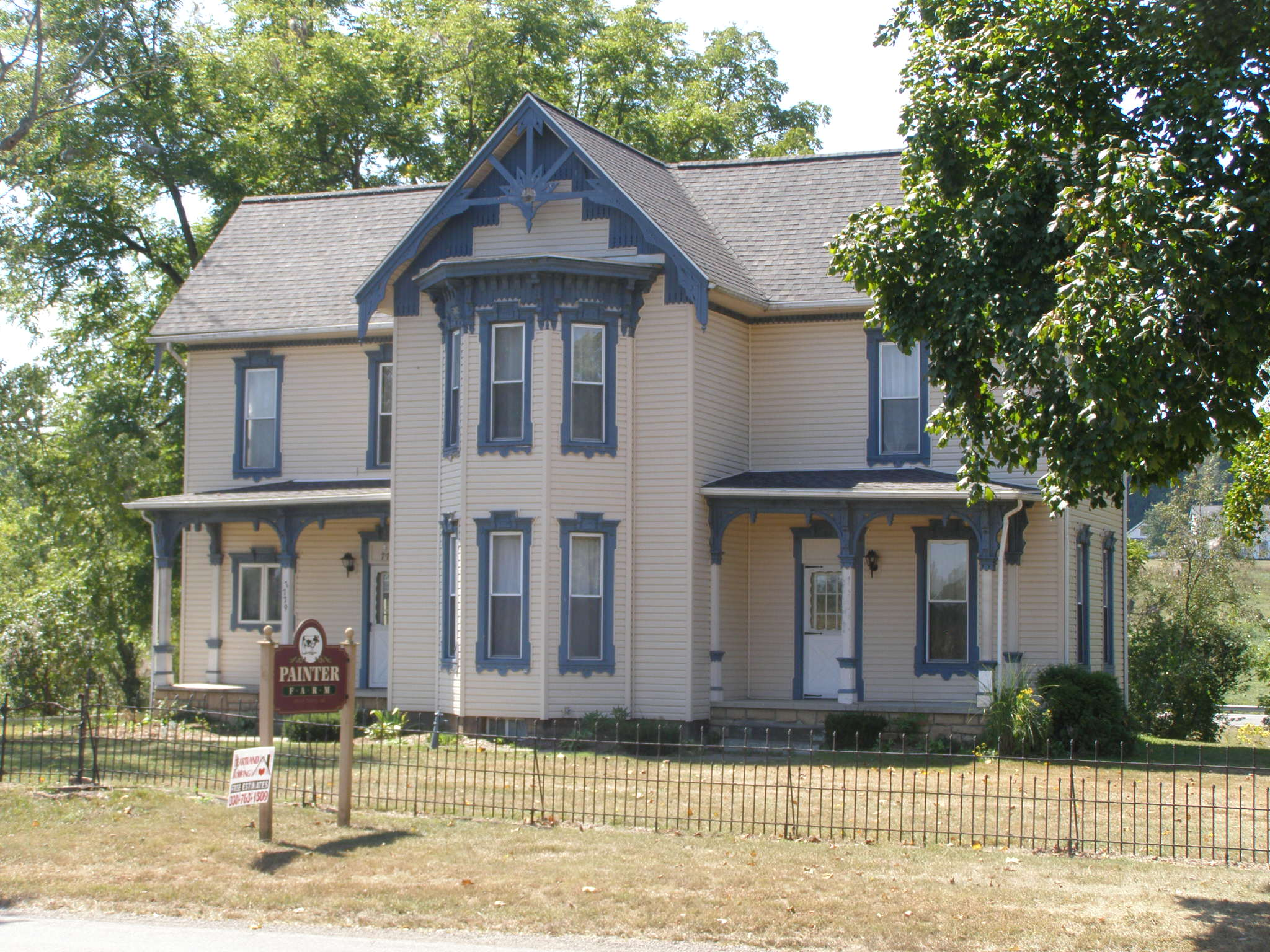
- The Joseph Armstrong Farmhouse, a historic site in the township

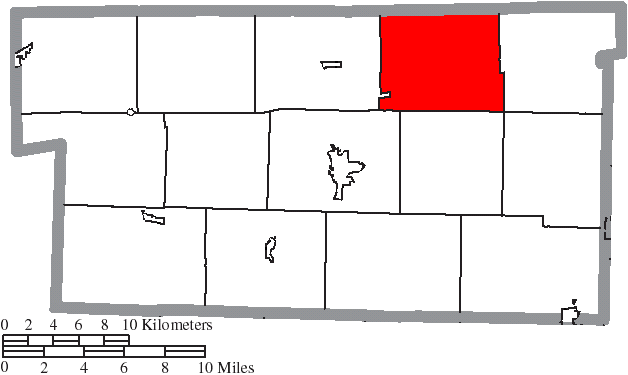
- Location of Salt Creek Township in Holmes County
- Coordinates: 40°38′12″N 81°49′37″W
- Country: United States
- State: Ohio
- County: Holmes

Area
  - Total: 29.9 sq mi (77.4 km^{2})
  - Land: 29.8 sq mi (77.3 km^{2})
  - Water: 0.039 sq mi (0.1 km^{2})
- Elevation: 1,099 ft (335 m)

Population (2020)
  - Total: 4,685
  - Density: 157/sq mi (60.6/km^{2})
- Time zone: UTC-5 (Eastern (EST))
  - Summer (DST): UTC-4 (EDT)
- ZIP code: 44660
- Area code: 330
- FIPS code: 39-70156
- GNIS feature ID: 1086338

Historical population
Census	Pop.	Note	%±
1990	3,061		—
2000	3,778		23.4%
2010	4,252		12.5%
2020	4,685		10.2%
2024 (est.)	4,739		1.2%
US Census:

Salt Creek Township is one of the fourteen townships of Holmes County, Ohio, United States. As of the 2020 census the population was 4,685.

== Geography ==
Located in the northern part of the county, it borders the following townships:

- Salt Creek Township, Wayne County - north
- Paint Township, Wayne County - northeast corner
- Paint Township - east
- Walnut Creek Township - southeast corner
- Berlin Township - south
- Hardy Township - southwest
- Prairie Township - west
- Franklin Township, Wayne County - northwest corner

No municipalities are located in Salt Creek Township, although the census-designated place of Mount Hope lies in the eastern part of the township.

== Name and history ==
It is one of five Salt Creek Townships statewide.

== Government ==
The township is governed by a three-member board of trustees, who are elected in November of odd-numbered years to a four-year term beginning on the following January 1. Two are elected in the year after the presidential election and one is elected in the year before it. There is also an elected township fiscal officer, who serves a four-year term beginning on April 1 of the year after the election, which is held in November of the year before the presidential election. Vacancies in the fiscal officership or on the board of trustees are filled by the remaining trustees.
