= United Methodist Church (Millersburg, Ohio) =

Historic church in Ohio, United States

- U.S. National Register of Historic Places
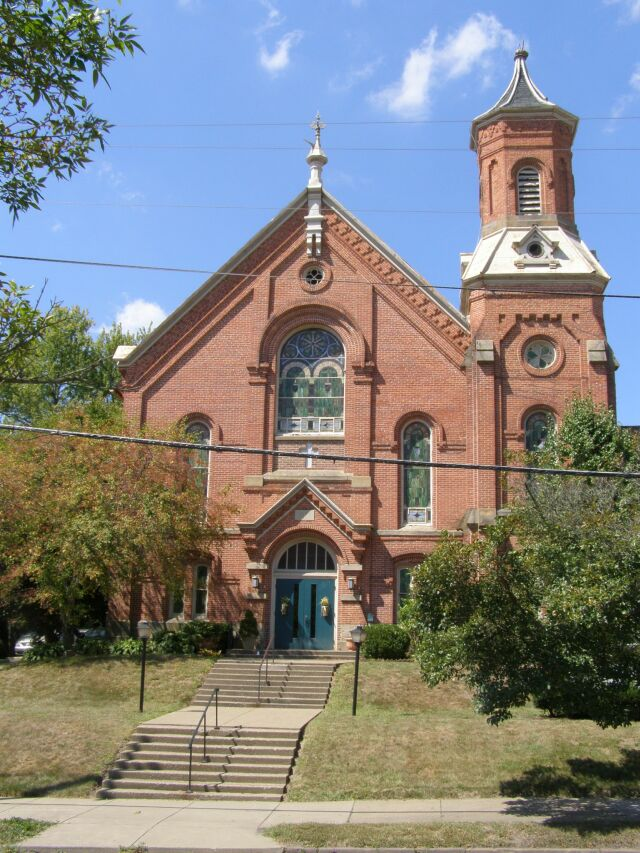

- Location within Ohio Location within the United States
- Location: N. Washington St., Millersburg, Ohio
- Coordinates: 40°33′21″N 81°55′8″W
- Area: Less than 1 acre (0.40 ha)
- Built: 1871
- Architectural style: Romanesque
- MPS: Millersburg MRA
- NRHP reference No.: 84003744
- Added to NRHP: July 17, 1984

United Methodist Church is a historic church North Washington Street in Millersburg, Ohio. The Methodist Episcopal Church of Millersburg was built in 1871, replacing an earlier building from 1821. It is a Romanesque Revival style standing two stories high with a slate gable roof.

The exterior has a paired stained glass window under a brick hood mould with brick corbelling. A stone belt runs between the first floor windows and the second floor windows. The gable peak is surmounted by a wooden cross on a finial. The northeast corner supports a buttressed bell tower with a tent roof. The sanctuary is on the second floor and retains the stained glass windows and a balcony.

It was added to the National Register in 1984.

== See also ==
- History of Methodism in the United States
