= Prairie Township, Holmes County, Ohio =

Township in Ohio, US

- Township
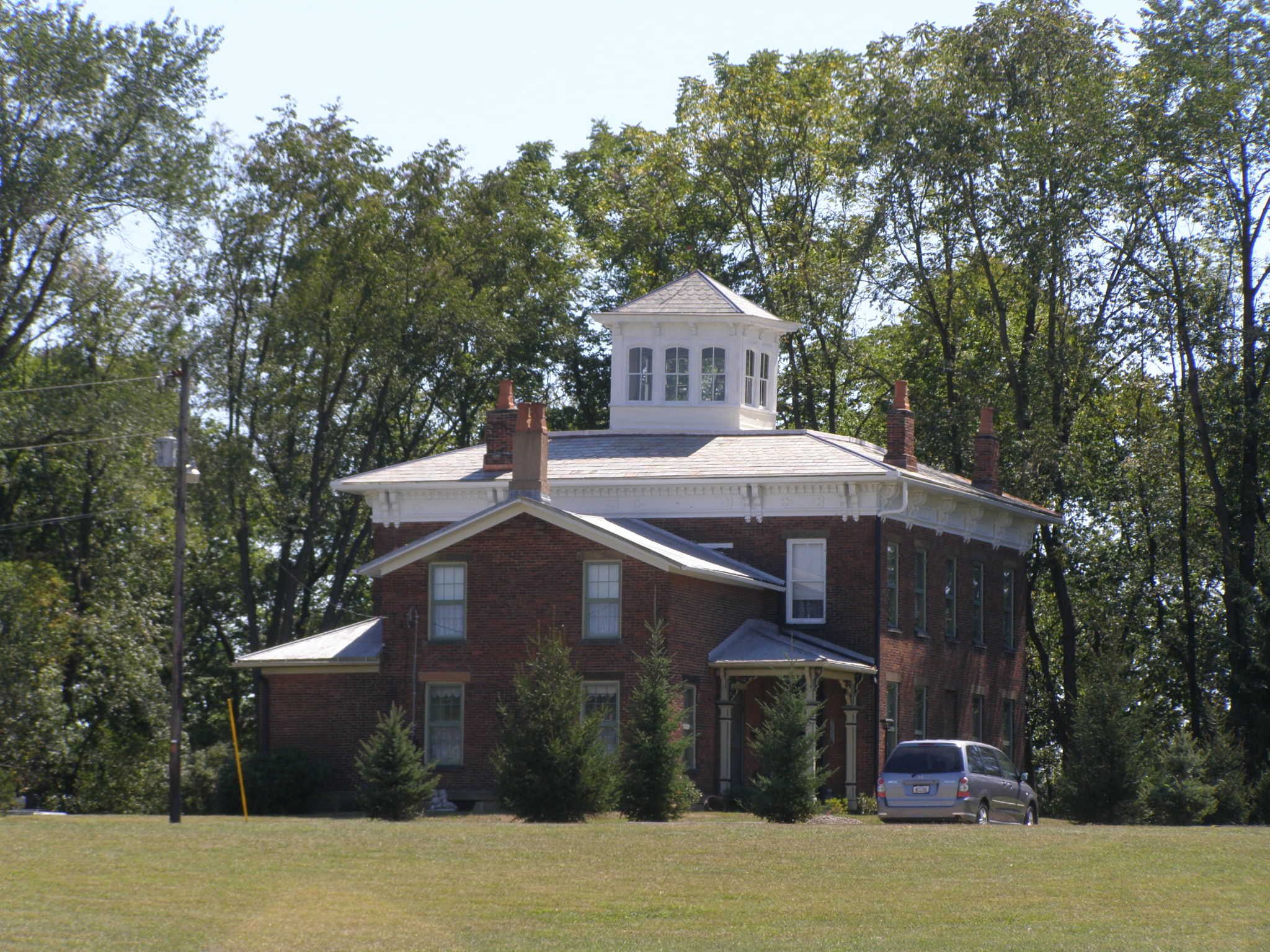
- Croco House on State Route 83

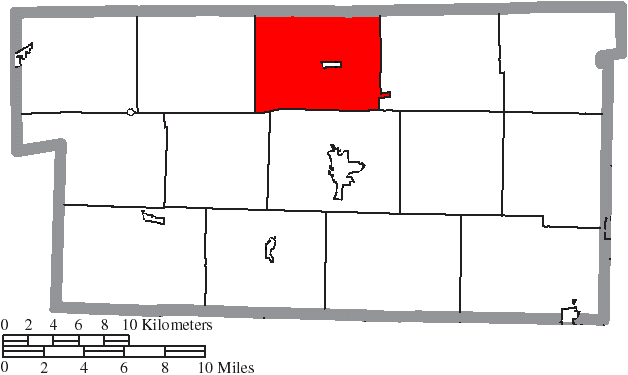
- Location of Prairie Township in Holmes County
- Coordinates: 40°37′51″N 81°56′8″W
- Country: United States
- State: Ohio
- County: Holmes

Area
  - Total: 30.7 sq mi (79.5 km^{2})
  - Land: 30.7 sq mi (79.4 km^{2})
  - Water: 0.039 sq mi (0.1 km^{2})
- Elevation: 843 ft (257 m)

Population (2020)
  - Total: 3,096
  - Density: 101/sq mi (39.0/km^{2})
- Time zone: UTC-5 (Eastern (EST))
  - Summer (DST): UTC-4 (EDT)
- FIPS code: 39-64584
- GNIS feature ID: 1086335

Historical population
Census	Pop.	Note	%±
1990	2,266		—
2000	2,747		21.2%
2010	3,133		14.1%
2020	3,096		−1.2%
2024 (est.)	3,104		0.3%
US Census:

Prairie Township is one of the fourteen townships of Holmes County, Ohio, United States. As of the 2020 census the population was 3,096.

== Geography ==
Located in the northern part of the county, it borders the following townships:

- Franklin Township, Wayne County - north
- Salt Creek Township, Wayne County - northeast corner
- Salt Creek Township - east
- Hardy Township - south
- Monroe Township - southwest
- Ripley Township - west
- Clinton Township, Wayne County - northwest corner

The village of Holmesville is located in central Prairie Township.

== Name and history ==
Statewide, the only other Prairie Township is located in Franklin County.

== Government ==
The township is governed by a three-member board of trustees, who are elected in November of odd-numbered years to a four-year term beginning on the following January 1. Two are elected in the year after the presidential election and one is elected in the year before it. There is also an elected township fiscal officer, who serves a four-year term beginning on April 1 of the year after the election, which is held in November of the year before the presidential election. Vacancies in the fiscal officership or on the board of trustees are filled by the remaining trustees.
