= Salt Creek Township, Hocking County, Ohio =

Township in Ohio, US

- Township
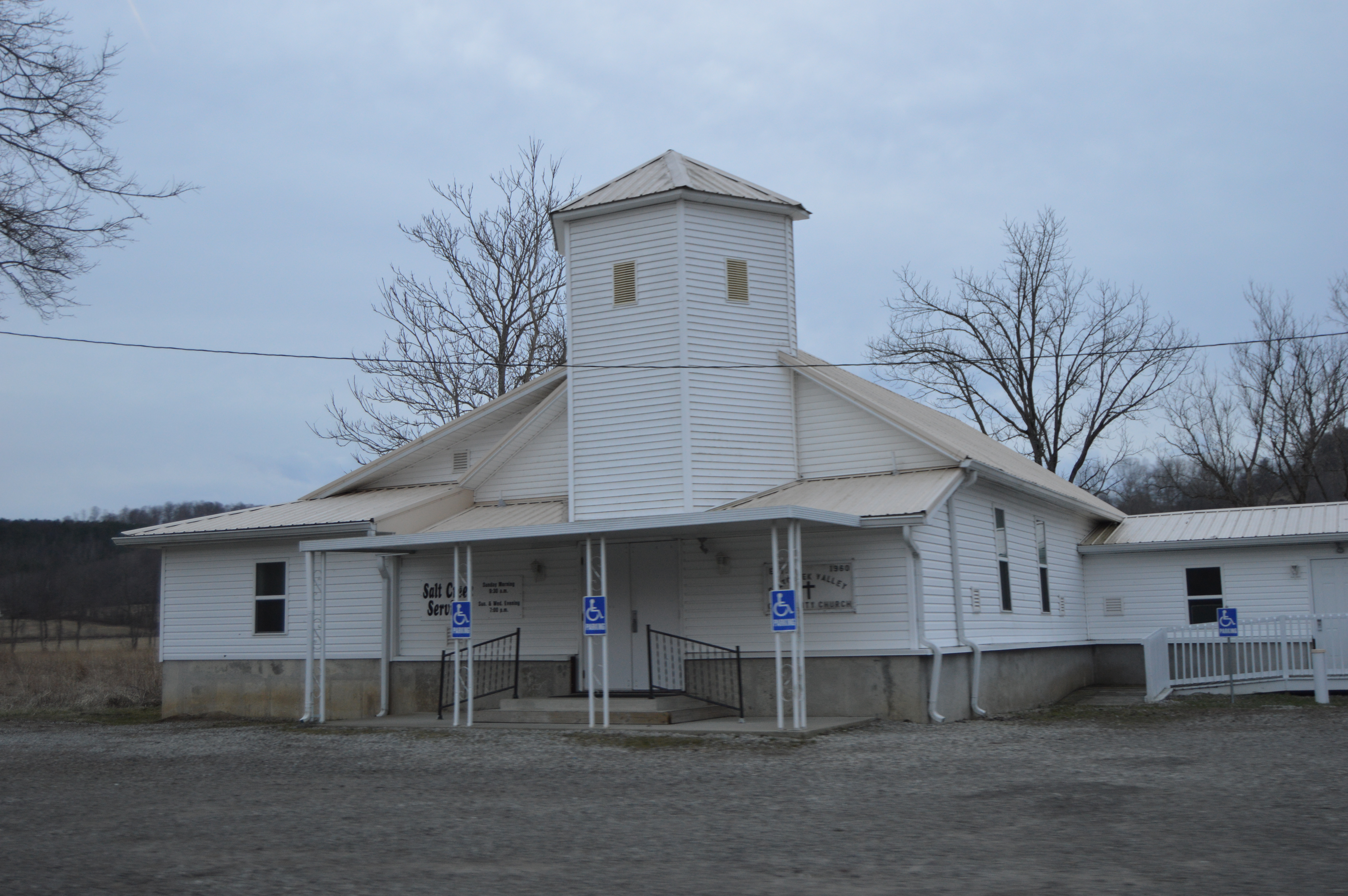
- Salt Creek Valley Community Church

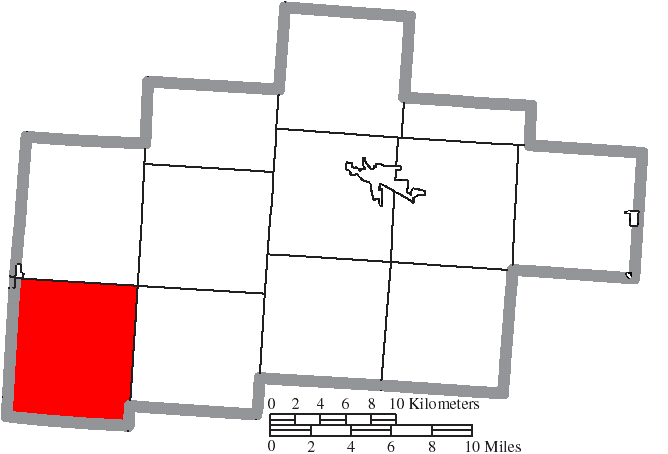
- Location of Salt Creek Township in Hocking County
- Coordinates: 39°26′1″N 82°41′40″W
- Country: United States
- State: Ohio
- County: Hocking

Area
  - Total: 42.11 sq mi (109.07 km^{2})
  - Land: 41.95 sq mi (108.64 km^{2})
  - Water: 0.17 sq mi (0.43 km^{2})
- Elevation: 1,056 ft (322 m)

Population (2020)
  - Total: 1,117
  - Density: 26.63/sq mi (10.28/km^{2})
- Time zone: UTC-5 (Eastern (EST))
  - Summer (DST): UTC-4 (EDT)
- FIPS code: 39-70142
- GNIS feature ID: 1086323

Salt Creek Township is one of the eleven townships of Hocking County, Ohio, United States. As of the 2020 census the population was 1,117.

== Geography ==
Located in the southwestern corner of the county, it borders the following townships:

- Perry Township - north
- Laurel Township - northeast corner
- Benton Township - east
- Jackson Township, Vinton County - southeast
- Eagle Township, Vinton County - south
- Harrison Township, Ross County - southwest
- Colerain Township, Ross County - west
- Salt Creek Township, Pickaway County - northwest corner

It is the most southerly township in Hocking County.

No municipalities are located in Salt Creek Township.

== Name and history ==
Salt Creek Township was named from the creek and associated salt production there.

It is one of five Salt Creek Townships statewide.

== Government ==
The township is governed by a three-member board of trustees, who are elected in November of odd-numbered years to a four-year term beginning on the following January 1. Two are elected in the year after the presidential election and one is elected in the year before it. There is also an elected township fiscal officer, who serves a four-year term beginning on April 1 of the year after the election, which is held in November of the year before the presidential election. Vacancies in the fiscal officership or on the board of trustees are filled by the remaining trustees.
