= Salt Creek Township, Wayne County, Ohio =

Township in Ohio, US

- Township
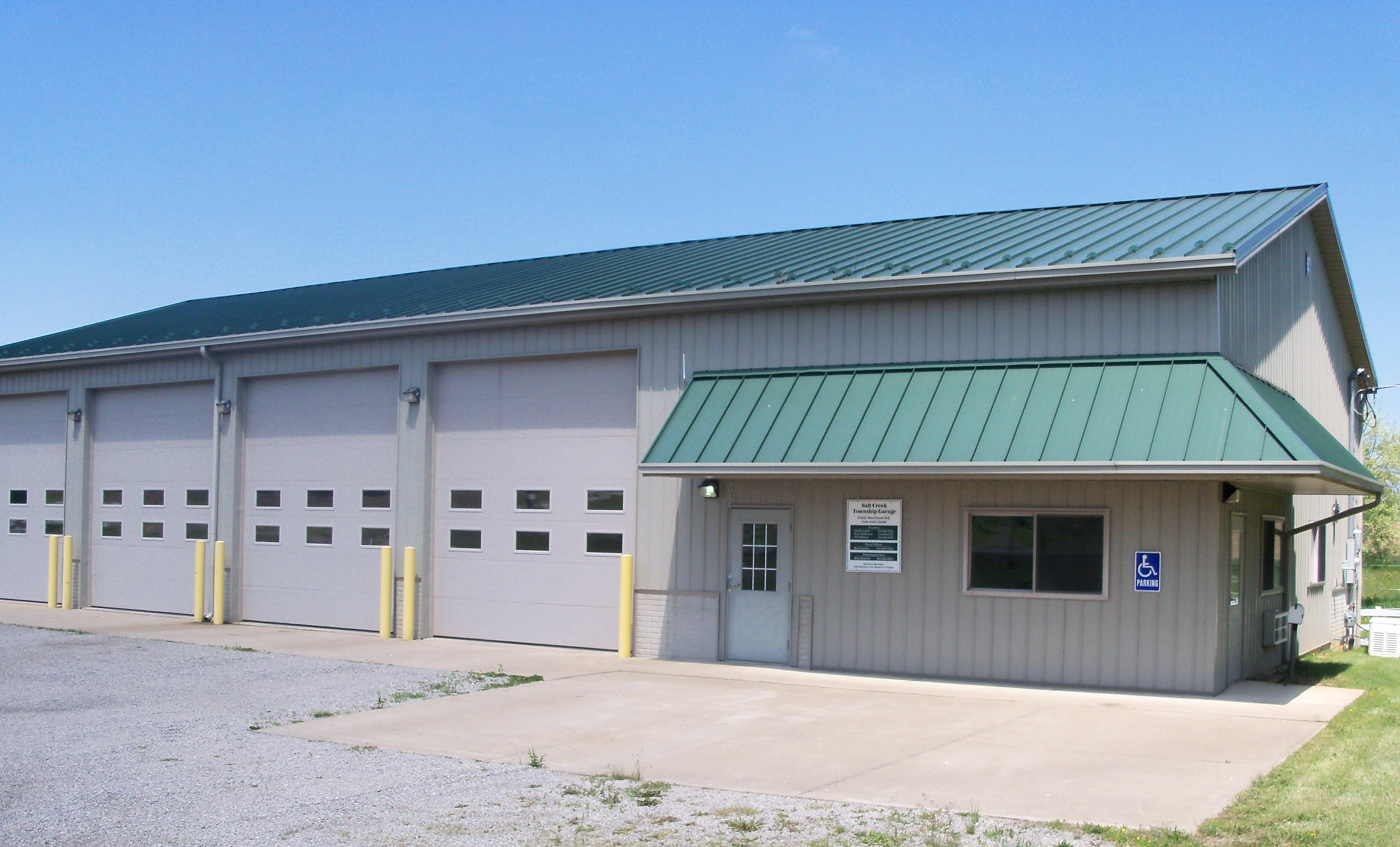
- Township garage and Town Hall on Harrison Road

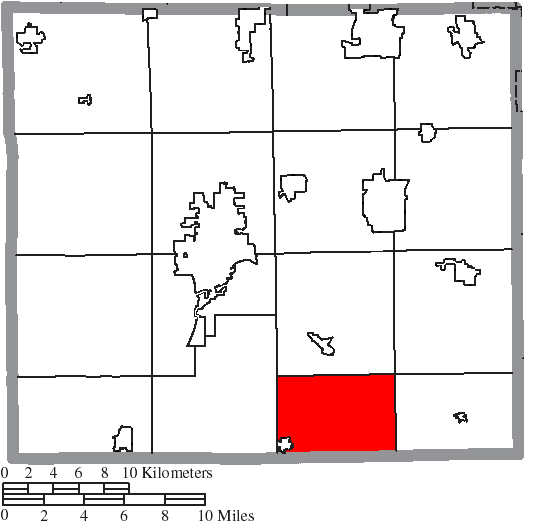
- Location of Salt Creek Township in Wayne County
- Coordinates: 40°41′37″N 81°50′50″W
- Country: United States
- State: Ohio
- County: Wayne

Area
  - Total: 23.8 sq mi (61.7 km^{2})
  - Land: 23.8 sq mi (61.6 km^{2})
  - Water: 0.039 sq mi (0.1 km^{2})
- Elevation: 1,178 ft (359 m)

Population (2020)
  - Total: 4,542
  - Density: 191/sq mi (73.7/km^{2})
- Time zone: UTC-5 (Eastern (EST))
  - Summer (DST): UTC-4 (EDT)
- FIPS code: 39-70198
- GNIS feature ID: 1087160

Historical population
Census	Pop.	Note	%±
1990	3,137		—
2000	3,783		20.6%
2010	4,309		13.9%
2020	4,542		5.4%
US Census:

Salt Creek Township is one of the sixteen townships of Wayne County, Ohio, United States. The 2020 census found 4,542 people in the township.

== Demographics ==
In 2000, 20.9% of Salt Creek residents identified as being of Pennsylvania German heritage. This was the highest percentage of Pennsylvania Germans of any place in the United States, Pennsylvania included.

== Geography ==
Located in the southern part of the county, it borders the following townships:

- East Union Township - north
- Sugar Creek Township - northeast corner
- Paint Township - east
- Paint Township, Holmes County - southeast corner
- Salt Creek Township, Holmes County - south
- Prairie Township, Holmes County - southwest corner
- Franklin Township - west

The village of Fredericksburg is located in southwestern Salt Creek Township.

== Name and history ==
It is one of five Salt Creek Townships statewide.

== Government ==
The township is governed by a three-member board of trustees, who are elected in November of odd-numbered years to a four-year term beginning on the following January 1. Two are elected in the year after the presidential election and one is elected in the year before it. There is also an elected township fiscal officer, who serves a four-year term beginning on April 1 of the year after the election, which is held in November of the year before the presidential election. Vacancies in the fiscal officership or on the board of trustees are filled by the remaining trustees.
