= Walnut Creek Township, Holmes County, Ohio =

Township in Ohio, US

- Township
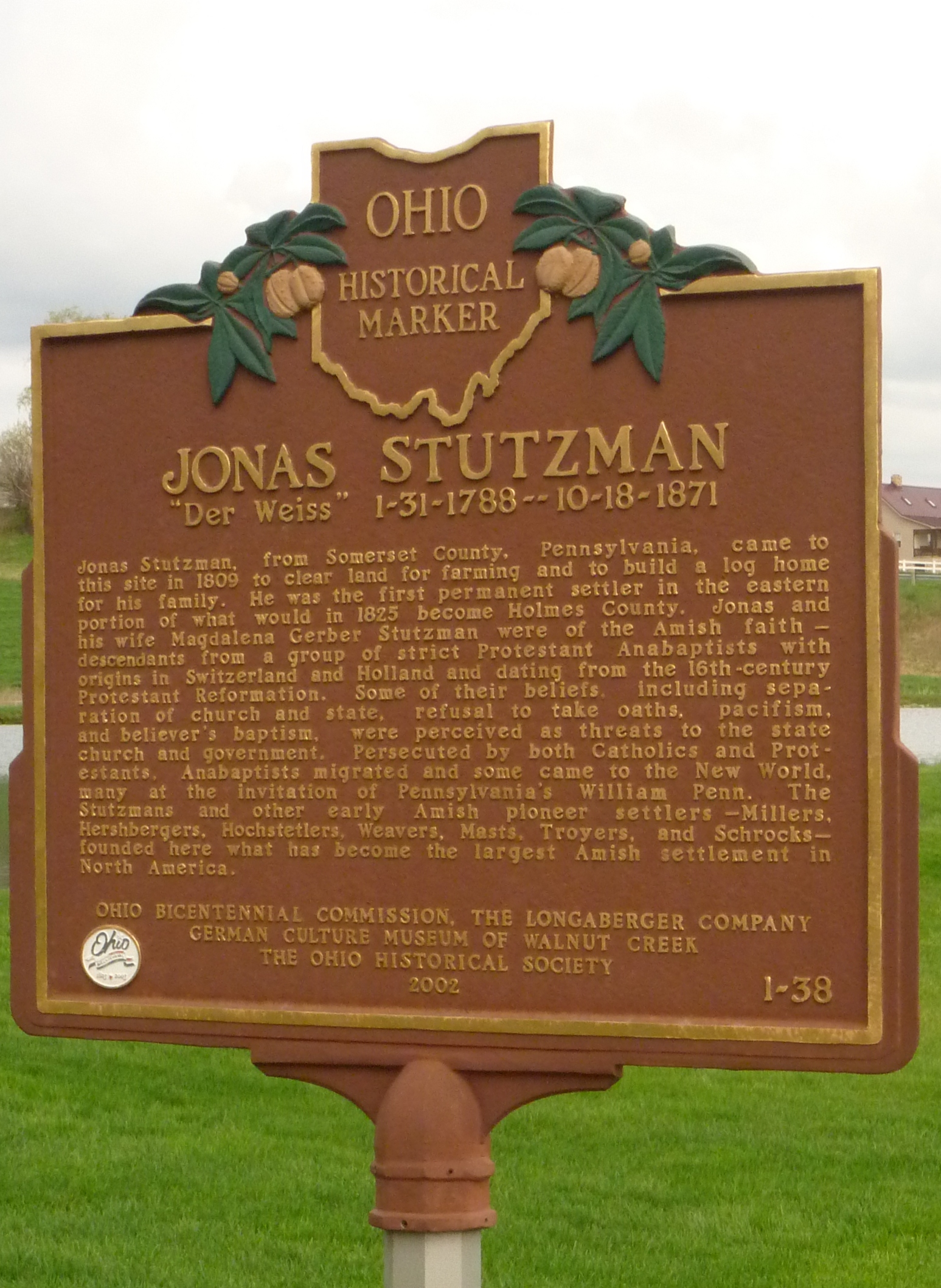
- This marker commemorates the first European settler in this township.

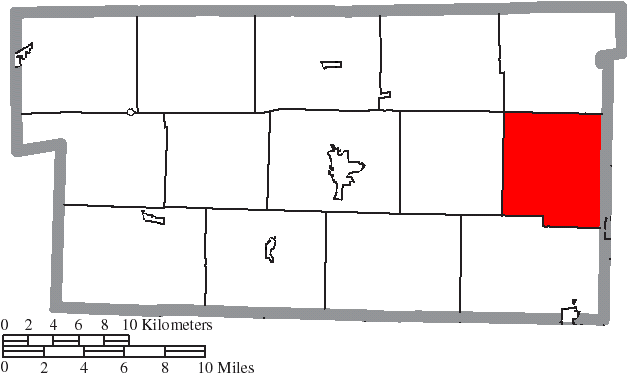
- Location of Walnut Creek Township in Holmes County
- Coordinates: 40°32′59″N 81°42′46″W
- Country: United States
- State: Ohio
- County: Holmes

Area
  - Total: 27.81 sq mi (72.04 km^{2})
  - Land: 27.78 sq mi (71.96 km^{2})
  - Water: 0.031 sq mi (0.08 km^{2})
- Elevation: 1,070 ft (326 m)

Population (2020)
  - Total: 3,992
  - Density: 143.7/sq mi (55.48/km^{2})
- Time zone: UTC-5 (Eastern (EST))
  - Summer (DST): UTC-4 (EDT)
- ZIP code: 44687
- Area code: 330
- FIPS code: 39-80626
- GNIS feature ID: 1086339

Historical population
Census	Pop.	Note	%±
1990	3,046		—
2000	3,541		16.3%
2010	3,821		7.9%
2020	3,992		4.5%
2024 (est.)	4,050		1.5%
US Census:

Walnut Creek Township is one of the fourteen townships of Holmes County, Ohio, United States. As of the 2020 census the population was 3,992.

== Geography ==
Located in the eastern part of the county, it borders the following townships:

- Paint Township - north
- Wayne Township, Tuscarawas County - northeast
- Sugar Creek Township, Tuscarawas County - southeast
- Clark Township - south
- Berlin Township - west
- Salt Creek Township - northwest corner

No municipalities are located in Walnut Creek Township, although the census-designated place of Walnut Creek lies at the center of the township.

== Name and history ==
It is the only Walnut Creek Township statewide.

== Government ==
The township is governed by a three-member board of trustees, who are elected in November of odd-numbered years to a four-year term beginning on the following January 1. Two are elected in the year after the presidential election and one is elected in the year before it. There is also an elected township fiscal officer, who serves a four-year term beginning on April 1 of the year after the election, which is held in November of the year before the presidential election. Vacancies in the fiscal officership or on the board of trustees are filled by the remaining trustees.
