= Cary House (Pangburn, Arkansas) =

Historic house in Arkansas, United States

- U.S. National Register of Historic Places
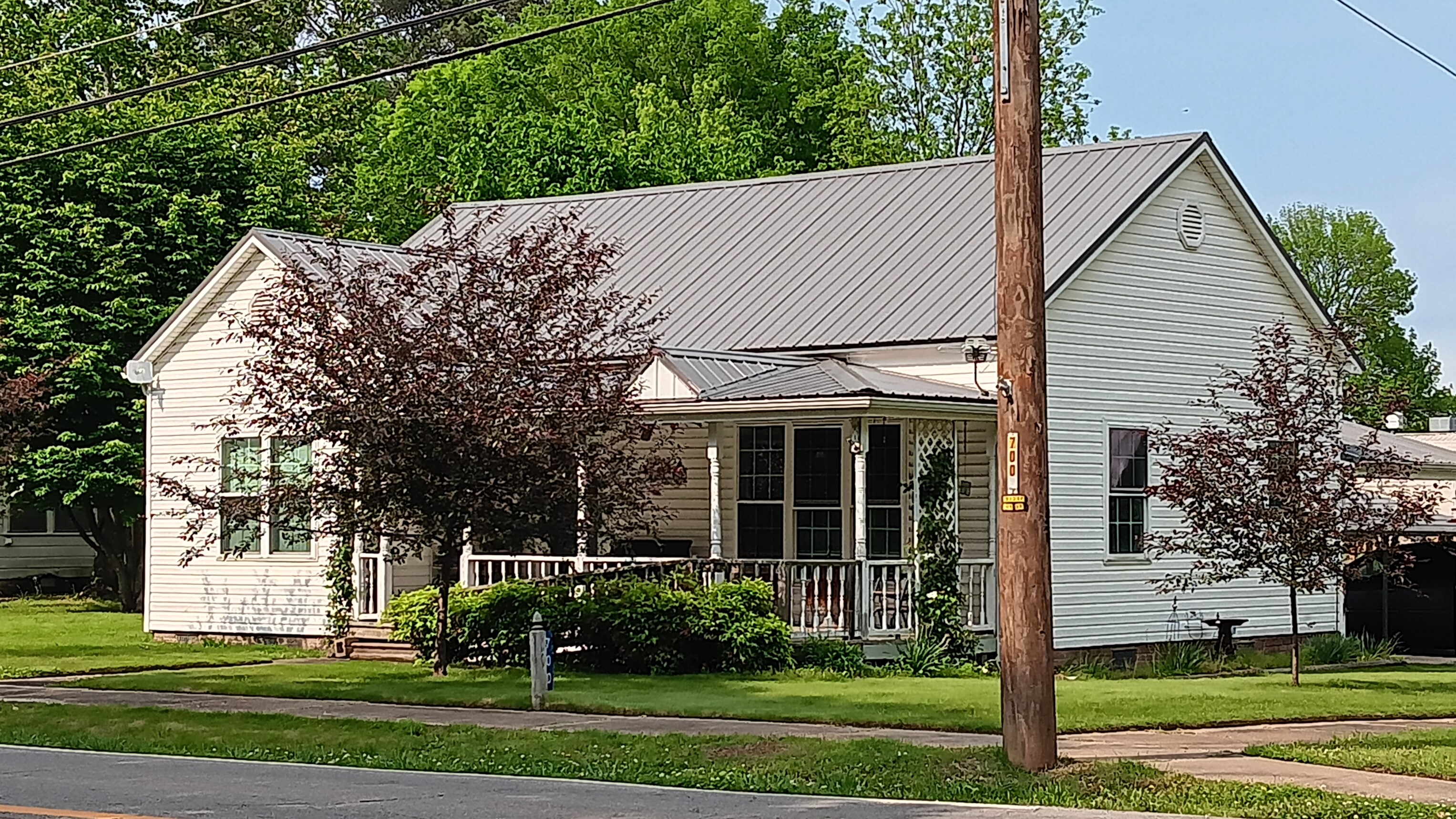

- Location within Arkansas Location within the United States
- Location: Jct. of Searcy and Short Sts., Pangburn, Arkansas
- Coordinates: 35°25′41″N 91°50′14″W
- Area: less than one acre
- Built: 1910
- Architectural style: Vernacular irregular plan
- MPS: White County MPS
- NRHP reference No.: 91001293
- Added to NRHP: July 10, 1992

The Cary House is a historic house at Searcy and Short Streets in Pangburn, Arkansas. It is a 1 1/2-story wood-frame structure with an irregular floor plan and vernacular styling. Its main facade, facing west, is dominated by a single-story shed-roof porch that wraps around to the side, and is supported by wooden box columns. Built about 1910, it is one of White County's few pre-World War I railroad-era houses to survive.

The house was listed on the National Register of Historic Places in 1992.

== See also ==
- National Register of Historic Places listings in White County, Arkansas
