= Boyd School =

- U.S. National Register of Historic Places
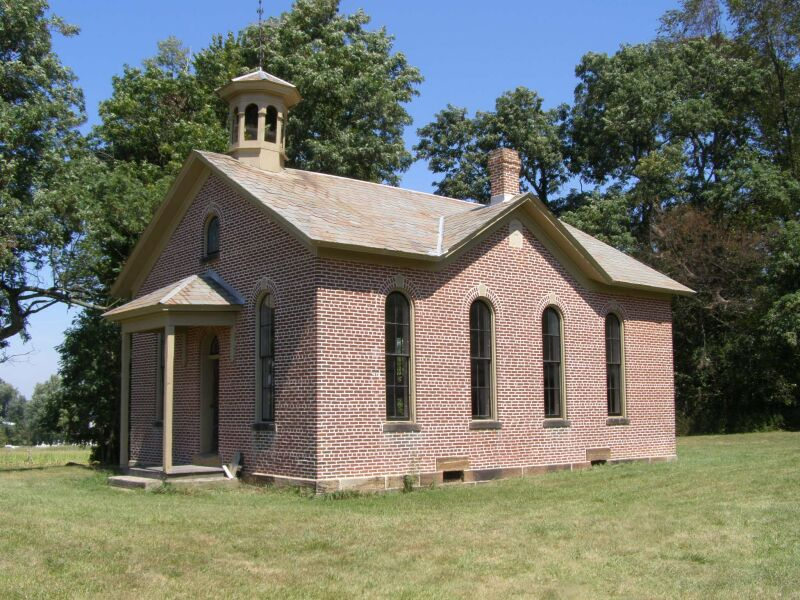
- View in 2010

- Location within Ohio Location within the United States
- Location: Northwest of Berlin, Ohio
- Coordinates: 40.579652°N 81.820207°W
- Area: 1 acre (0.40 ha)
- Built: 1889
- Architectural style: Italianate
- NRHP reference No.: 80003103
- Added to NRHP: October 3, 1980

Boyd School is a brick Italianate style one-room school house built in 1889, in Holmes County, Ohio. It was used as a schoolhouse until 1962. The brick building replaced another building that was built during the American Civil War. It is the only preserved one-room schoolhouse in the county. It is located northwest of Berlin on the Fryburg-Fredericksbury-Boyd Road.

It was listed on the National Register of Historic Places in 1980.
