= Paint Township, Holmes County, Ohio =

Township in Ohio, US

- Township
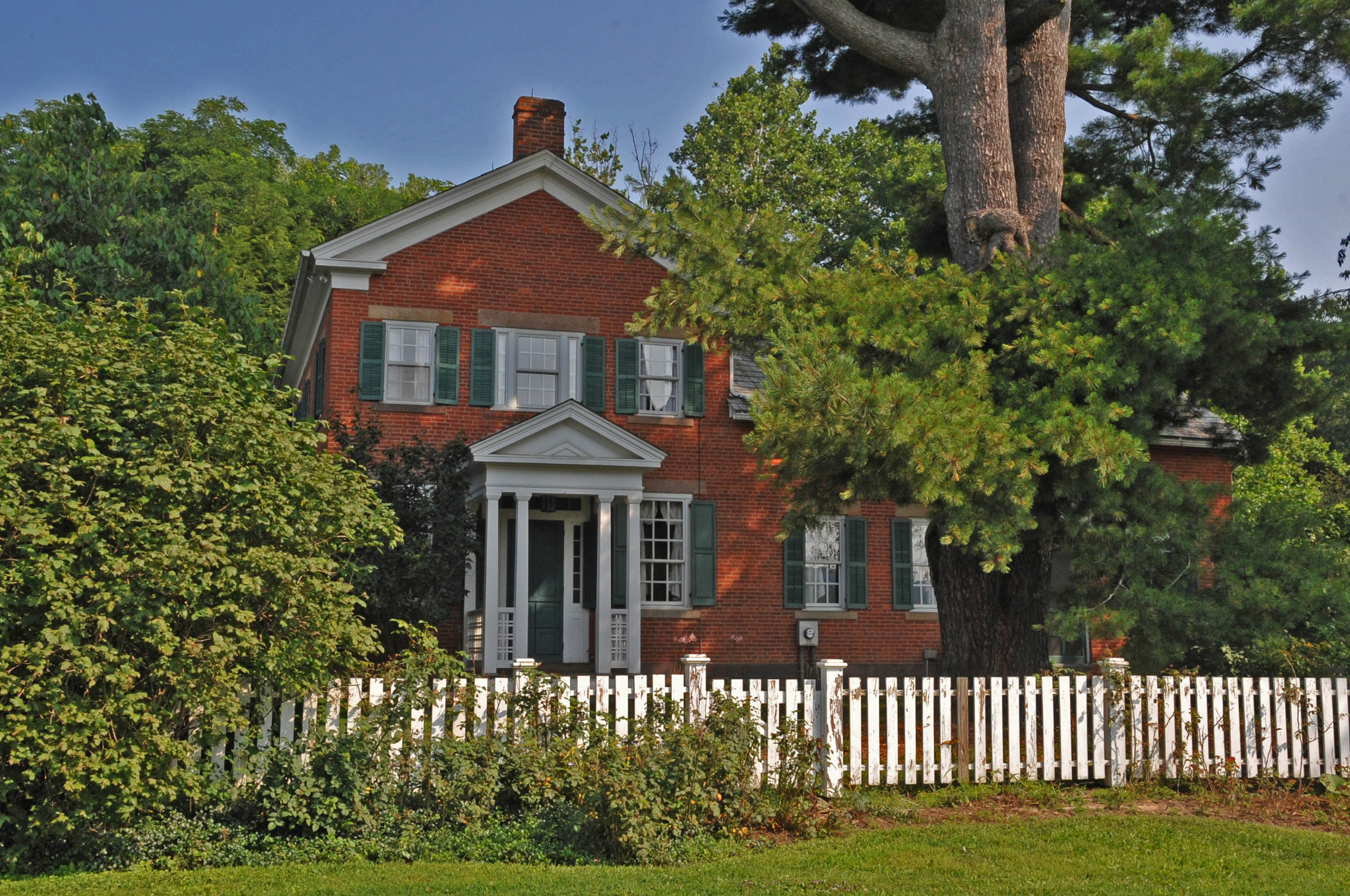
- Shull-Lugenbuhl Farmhouse

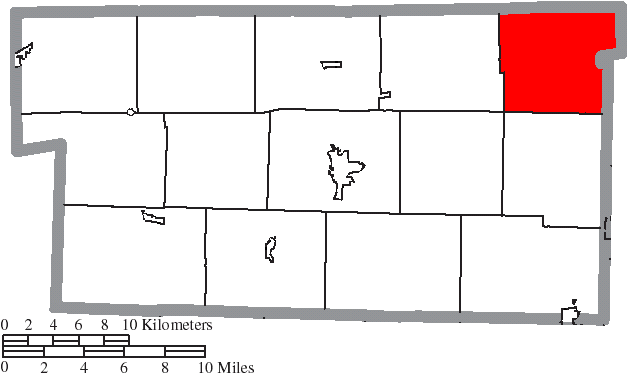
- Location of Paint Township in Holmes County
- Coordinates: 40°37′41″N 81°42′55″W
- Country: United States
- State: Ohio
- County: Holmes

Area
  - Total: 28.95 sq mi (74.98 km^{2})
  - Land: 28.88 sq mi (74.81 km^{2})
  - Water: 0.066 sq mi (0.17 km^{2})
- Elevation: 1,293 ft (394 m)

Population (2020)
  - Total: 4,564
  - Density: 158.0/sq mi (61.01/km^{2})
- Time zone: UTC-5 (Eastern (EST))
  - Summer (DST): UTC-4 (EDT)
- FIPS code: 39-59514
- GNIS feature ID: 1086334

Historical population
Census	Pop.	Note	%±
1990	2,825		—
2000	3,547		25.6%
2010	4,134		16.5%
2020	4,564		10.4%
2024 (est.)	4,602		0.8%
US Census:

Paint Township is one of the fourteen townships of Holmes County, Ohio, United States. As of the 2020 census the population was 4,564.

According to the 2021 American Community Survey's 5-Year Estimates, 16.2% of the township's population spoke only English, while 83.8% spoke an "other [than Spanish] Indo-European language."

== Geography ==
Located in the northeastern corner of the county, it borders the following townships:

- Paint Township, Wayne County - north
- Sugar Creek Township, Stark County - northeast
- Wayne Township, Tuscarawas County - southeast
- Walnut Creek Township - south
- Berlin Township - southwest corner
- Salt Creek Township - west
- Salt Creek Township, Wayne County - northwest corner

It is the only township in the county to border Stark County.

No municipalities are located in Paint Township, although the census-designated place of Winesburg lies in the southwestern part of the township.

== Name and history ==
Paint Township most likely was named for a local spring where the water was imparted with a reddish hue. It is one of six Paint Townships statewide.

== Government ==
The township is governed by a three-member board of trustees, who are elected in November of odd-numbered years to a four-year term beginning on the following January 1. Two are elected in the year after the presidential election and one is elected in the year before it. There is also an elected township fiscal officer, who serves a four-year term beginning on April 1 of the year after the election, which is held in November of the year before the presidential election. Vacancies in the fiscal officership or on the board of trustees are filled by the remaining trustees.
