= Apple Creek, Ohio =

- Village
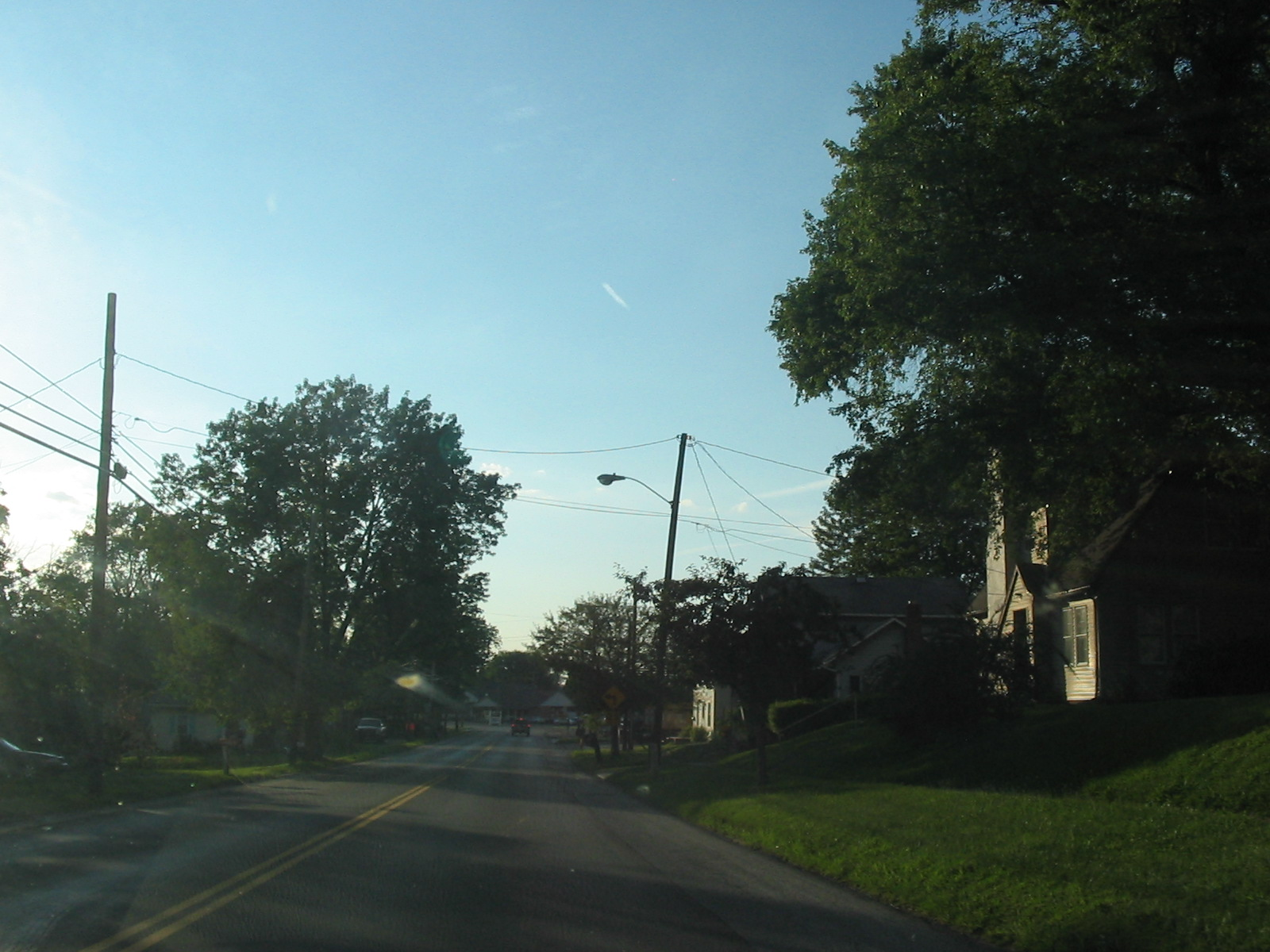
- Central Apple Creek in the early morning

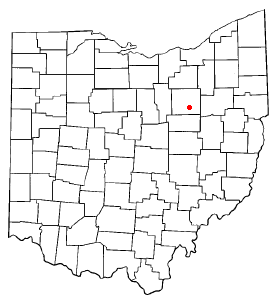
- Location of Apple Creek, Ohio

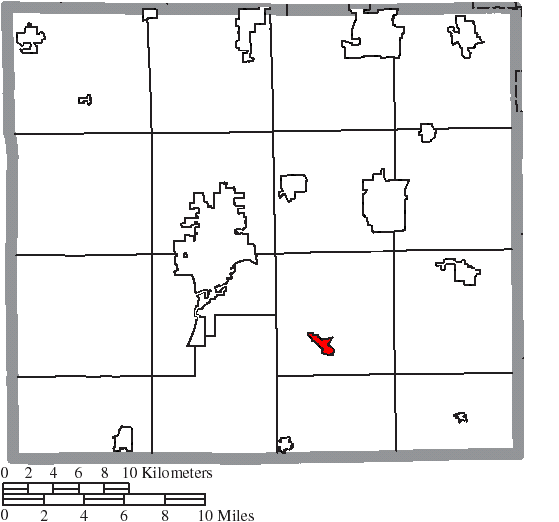
- Location of Apple Creek in Wayne County

- Location within Ohio Location within the United States Location within North America
- Coordinates: 40°45′02″N 81°50′08″W
- Country: United States
- State: Ohio
- County: Wayne

Area
  - Total: 0.59 sq mi (1.53 km^{2})
  - Land: 0.59 sq mi (1.52 km^{2})
  - Water: 0.0039 sq mi (0.01 km^{2})
- Elevation: 1,020 ft (310 m)

Population (2020)
  - Total: 1,188
  - Estimate (2023): 1,183
  - Density: 2,025.4/sq mi (782.02/km^{2})
- Time zone: UTC-5 (Eastern (EST))
  - Summer (DST): UTC-4 (EDT)
- ZIP code: 44606
- Area code: 330
- FIPS code: 39-02232
- GNIS feature ID: 2397972
- Website: www.apple-creek.org

Apple Creek is a village in East Union Township, Wayne County, Ohio, United States. The population was 1,188 at the 2020 census.

The village takes its name from nearby Apple Creek.

Apple Creek has been home to a large Old Order Amish community since the mid-1800s.

== Geography ==
According to the United States Census Bureau, the village has a total area of 0.58 square miles (1.50 km^{2}), all of it land.

== Demographics ==
Historical population
Census	Pop.	Note	%±
1870	300		—
1880	385		28.3%
1890	428		11.2%
1900	387		−9.6%
1910	400		3.4%
1920	382		−4.5%
1930	459		20.2%
1940	510		11.1%
1950	548		7.5%
1960	722		31.8%
1970	784		8.6%
1980	741		−5.5%
1990	860		16.1%
2000	999		16.2%
2010	1,173		17.4%
2020	1,188		1.3%
2023 (est.)	1,183	▼	−0.4%
U.S. Decennial Census

=== 2010 census ===
As of the census of 2010, there were 1,173 people, 449 households, and 314 families living in the village. The population density was 2,022.4 inhabitants per square mile (780.9/km^{2}). There were 485 housing units at an average density of 836.2 per square mile (322.9/km^{2}). The racial makeup of the village was 97.7% White, 0.3% African American, 0.3% Native American, 0.7% Asian, 0.8% from other races, and 0.3% from two or more races. Hispanic or Latino of any race were 3.7% of the population.

There were 449 households, of which 35.6% had children under the age of 18 living with them, 56.6% were married couples living together, 9.4% had a female householder with no husband present, 4.0% had a male householder with no wife present, and 30.1% were non-families. 26.1% of all households were made up of individuals, and 10.6% had someone living alone who was 65 years of age or older. The average household size was 2.61 and the average family size was 3.15.

The median age in the village was 37.9 years. 27.3% of residents were under the age of 18; 8.1% were between the ages of 18 and 24; 24.9% were from 25 to 44; 26% were from 45 to 64; and 13.7% were 65 years of age or older. The gender makeup of the village was 49.4% male and 50.6% female.

=== 2000 census ===
As of the census of 2000, there were 999 people, 399 households, and 290 families living in the village. The population density was 1,648.3 inhabitants per square mile (636.4/km^{2}). There were 414 housing units at an average density of 683.1 per square mile (263.7/km^{2}). The racial makeup of the village was 98.10% White, 0.50% Asian, 0.10% Pacific Islander, 0.20% from other races, and 1.10% from two or more races. Hispanic or Latino of any race were 0.50% of the population.

There were 399 households, out of which 35.8% had children under the age of 18 living with them, 58.1% were married couples living together, 11.5% had a female householder with no husband present, and 27.1% were non-families. 23.8% of all households were made up of individuals, and 6.5% had someone living alone who was 65 years of age or older. The average household size was 2.50 and the average family size was 2.96.

In the village, the population was spread out, with 26.8% under the age of 18, 9.7% from 18 to 24, 31.4% from 25 to 44, 22.5% from 45 to 64, and 9.5% who were 65 years of age or older. The median age was 34 years. For every 100 females there were 88.8 males. For every 100 females age 18 and over, there were 90.9 males.

The median income for a household in the village was $41,574, and the median income for a family was $47,500. Males had a median income of $30,917 versus $24,226 for females. The per capita income for the village was $18,113. About 3.5% of families and 5.5% of the population were below the poverty line, including 5.3% of those under age 18 and 7.0% of those age 65 or over.
