= Winesburg, Holmes County, Ohio =

Winesburg, Ohio
- Census-designated place
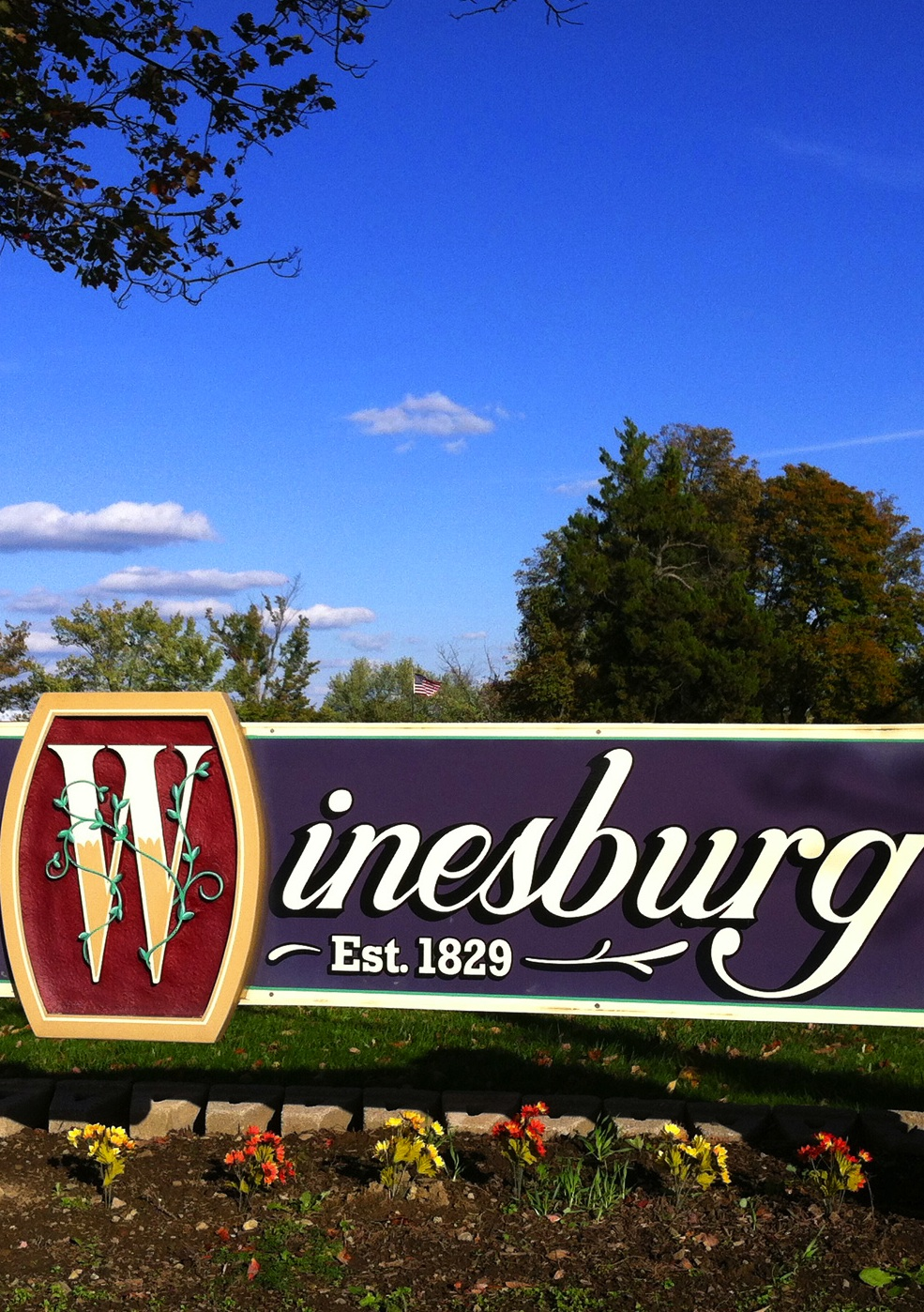
- Welcome sign

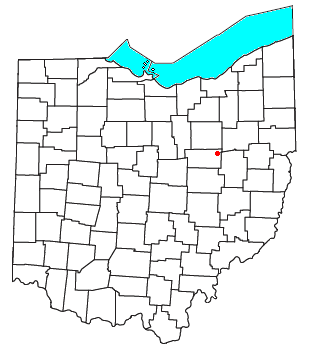
- Location of Winesburg in Ohio
- Coordinates: 40°37′03″N 81°41′41″W
- Country: United States
- State: Ohio
- County: Holmes
- Township: Paint

Area
  - Total: 0.63 sq mi (1.63 km^{2})
  - Land: 0.63 sq mi (1.62 km^{2})
  - Water: 0.0039 sq mi (0.01 km^{2})
- Elevation: 1,286 ft (392 m)

Population (2020)
  - Total: 340
  - Density: 542.0/sq mi (209.28/km^{2})
- Time zone: UTC-5 (Eastern (EST))
  - Summer (DST): UTC-4 (EDT)
- ZIP code: 44690
- Area code: 330
- FIPS code: 39-86072
- GNIS feature ID: 2628988

Winesburg is an unincorporated community and census-designated place (CDP) in Paint Township, Holmes County, Ohio, in the United States. The population was 340 at the 2020 census. The community sits on the crest of a hill in the Amish country of Ohio. It lies along U.S. Route 62.

It is not the setting of the novel Winesburg, Ohio by Sherwood Anderson, a collection of inter-related fictional short stories about citizens of a small town set in the early 20th century.

== History ==
The community was founded in 1829 and originally named Weinsberg, after Weinsberg in Germany. The spelling was changed to "Winesburg" by postal authorities in 1833 when a post office was opened there.

== Geography ==
Winesburg is in the southeastern part of Paint Township, in northeastern Holmes County. The community sits on a ridge, with the north side draining toward the Middle Fork of Sugar Creek and the south side draining to Indian Trail Creek, a tributary of the South Fork of Sugar Creek. Via Sugar Creek, Winesburg is part of the Tuscarawas River watershed draining to the Ohio River. According to the U.S. Census Bureau, the Winesburg CDP has a total area of 0.63 square miles (1.63 km^{2}), of which 1.6 acres (6,533 m^{2}), or 0.40%, are water.

U.S. Route 62, which runs through Winesburg as Main Street, leads northeast 24 miles (39 km) to downtown Canton and southwest 13 miles (21 km) to Millersburg, the Holmes county seat.

== Demographics ==
Historical population
Census	Pop.	Note	%±
2020	340		—
U.S. Decennial Census
