= Ohio State Route 585 =

State highway in northeastern Ohio, US

State Route 585

Route information
- Maintained by ODOT
- Length: 19.94 mi (32.09 km)
- Existed: 1969–present

Major junctions
- South end: SR 3 / SR 83 in Wooster
- North end: SR 21 in Norton

Location
- Country: United States
- State: Ohio
- Counties: Wayne, Summit

Highway system
- Ohio State Highway System; Interstate; US; State; Scenic
← SR 584	→ SR 586

State Route 585 (SR 585) is a north–south (physically northeast-southwest) state highway in the northeastern portion of the U.S. state of Ohio. The southern terminus of State Route 585 is at the SR 3/SR 83 concurrency in Wooster. The northern terminus of this state route is an interchange with SR 21 in Norton, where Wooster Road then continues to the northeast into Barberton.

== Route description ==
The path of SR 585 takes it through the northeastern quadrant of Wayne County and just into the southwestern part of Summit County. There are no segments of State Route 585 that are included as a part of the National Highway System, a network of highways deemed most important for the economy, mobility and defense of the country.

The Highway begins at an interchange with State Routes 3 and 83 at eastern Wooster. Much of State Route 585 is in a northeast-southwest direction, passing through towns such as Smithville. Towards State Route 21, the section of State Route 585 is more urban, passing through Easton and Doylestown. Here, State Route 585 has a brief concurrency with State Route 94, and also connects State Routes 57 and 604 before an interchange with State Route 21.

The interchange with SR 21 has an unusual configuration. It is a combination interchange with a left-hand flyover ramp from eastbound SR 585 to northbound SR 21. Eastbound Wooster Road just west of the interchange crosses the ramp from northbound SR 585 to southbound SR 21 at-grade and merges with the loop ramp from southbound SR 21 to eastbound Wooster Road.

== History ==
SR 585 was first designated in 1969. This designation replaced what was a portion of SR 5 up until that year, running from an interchange with SR 3 and what was then designated SR 76 (now SR 83) on the east side of Wooster northeasterly to an interchange with what was then US 21 (currently SR 21) in Norton. SR 585 has not experienced any major changes to its routing since its inception.

== Major intersections ==
County	Location	mi	km	Destinations	Notes
Wayne	Wooster	0.00	0.00	SR 3 / SR 83 to US 30 – Lodi, Medina	Southern terminus of SR 585
Wayne	Milton–Chippewa township line	12.17	19.59	SR 57 (Wadsworth Road) – Rittman, Orrville	
Wayne	Chippewa Township	13.90	22.37	SR 94 south (Mt. Eaton Road) / SR 604 west (Easton Road) – Congress, Marshallville	Southern end of SR 94 concurrency; eastern terminus of SR 604
Wayne	Chippewa Township	14.76	23.75	SR 94 north (Mt. Eaton Road) – Wadsworth	Northern end of SR 94 concurrency
Wayne	Chippewa Township	16.47	26.51	CR 70 (Doylestown Road / Collier Drive)	One-quadrant interchange
Summit	Norton	19.27	31.01	Hametown Road	Partial cloverleaf interchange; no direct access to northbound SR 585 / Wooster Road
Summit	Norton	19.94	32.09	SR 21 / Wooster Road – Massillon, Cleveland, Barberton	Combination interchange; extra ramp indirectly provides Hametown Road interchange's missing movement; northern terminus of SR 585; roadway continues as Wooster Road
1.000 mi = 1.609 km; 1.000 km = 0.621 mi: Concurrency terminus; Incomplete access
