= Ohio State Route 539 =

State highway in Wayne County, Ohio, US

State Route 539

Route information
- Maintained by ODOT
- Length: 13.47 mi (21.68 km)
- Existed: 1964–present

Major junctions
- South end: SR 302 in Chester Township
- I-71 in Congress Township
- North end: SR 301 in West Salem

Location
- Country: United States
- State: Ohio
- Counties: Wayne

Highway system
- Ohio State Highway System; Interstate; US; State; Scenic
← SR 538	→ SR 540

State Route 539 (SR 539) is a north–south state highway in the northeastern quadrant of the U.S. state of Ohio. State Route 539 has its southern terminus at State Route 302 in Chester Township approximately 3 miles (4.8 km) northwest of the city limits of Wooster. Its northern terminus is at its junction with State Route 301 in West Salem, just one block south of that route's junction with U.S. Route 42.

== Route description ==
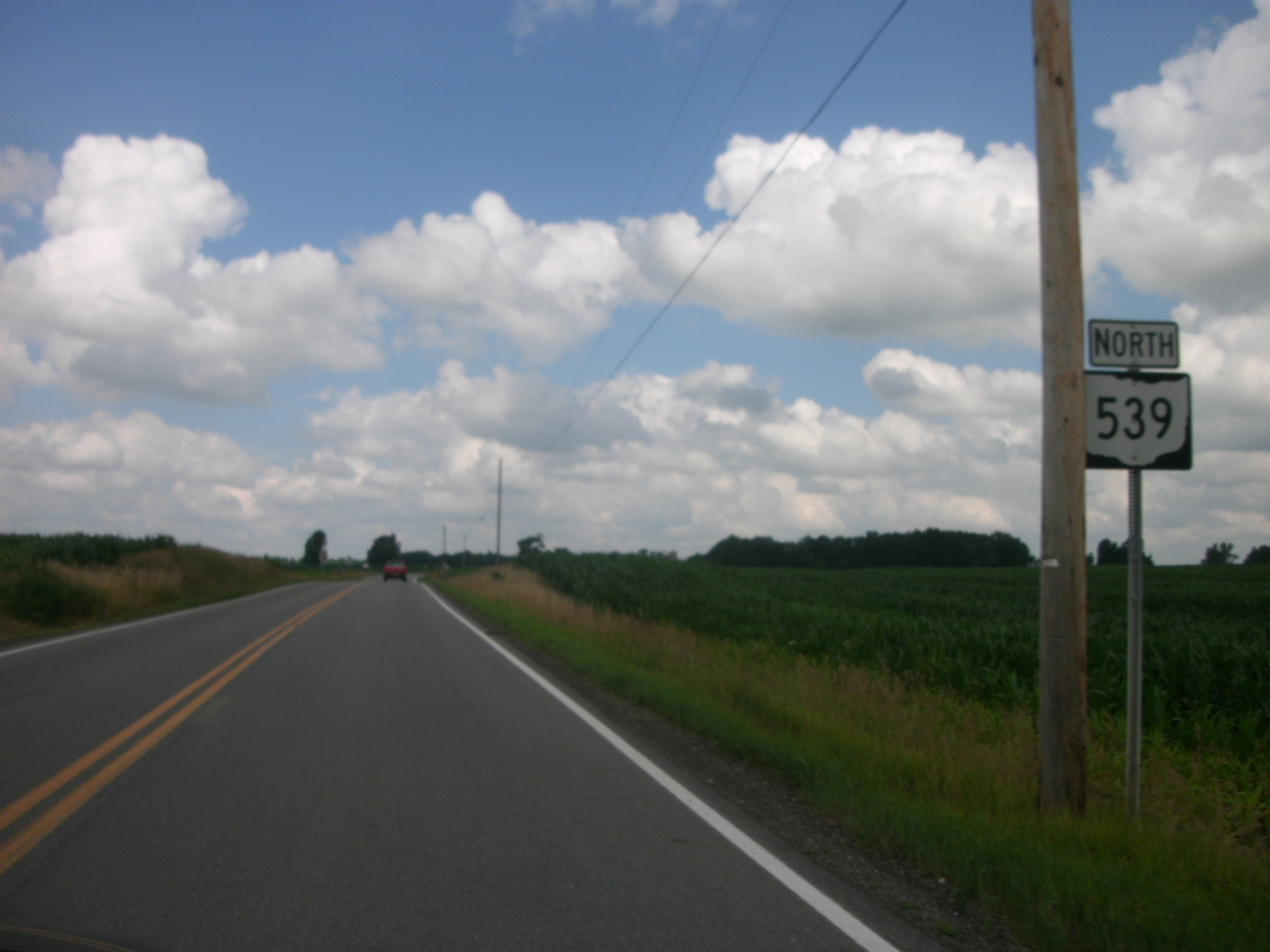
SR 539 in Congress Township

The entirety of State Route 539 is situated within the northwestern portion of Wayne County. There is no segment of this route that is included within the National Highway System, a network of highways deemed to be most important for the country's economy, mobility.

== History ==
State Route 539 was designated in 1964. The route was established along the alignment that it utilizes to this day between State Route 302 near Wooster and State Route 301 in West Salem. No changes of major significance have taken place to State Route 539 since its inception.

== Major intersections ==
The entire route is in Wayne County.

Location	mi	km	Destinations	Notes
Chester Township	0.00	0.00	SR 302	
Congress	8.24	13.26	SR 604 east (Oak Street) / Maple Street	Southern end of SR 604 concurrency
Congress	8.60	13.84	SR 604 west	Northern end of SR 604 concurrency
Congress Township	10.83	17.43	I-71 – Cleveland, Columbus	Exit 198 (I-71)
West Salem	13.47	21.68	SR 301 (Main Street) / Congress Street	
1.000 mi = 1.609 km; 1.000 km = 0.621 mi: Concurrency terminus
