= Ohio State Route 604 =

State highway in Ohio, US

State Route 604

Route information
- Maintained by ODOT
- Length: 24.13 mi (38.83 km)
- Existed: 1937–present

Major junctions
- West end: US 42 near West Salem
- SR 3 near Creston
- East end: SR 94 / SR 585 near Rittman

Location
- Country: United States
- State: Ohio
- Counties: Ashland, Wayne

Highway system
- Ohio State Highway System; Interstate; US; State; Scenic
← SR 603	→ SR 605

State Route 604 (SR 604) is an east–west state highway in north central Ohio. The western terminus of SR 604 is at a T-intersection with US 42 in Jackson Township approximately 5 miles (8.0 km) southwest of West Salem. Its eastern terminus is at the intersection that doubles as the southern split of the concurrency of SR 94 and SR 585 in Chippewa Township nearly 1.5 miles (2.4 km) southeast of Rittman.

Created in the late 1930s, this primarily rural route traverses the northeastern corner of Ashland County and the northern tier of Wayne County. State Route 604 passes through one incorporated community along its path, Congress, where it meets SR 539.

== Route description ==
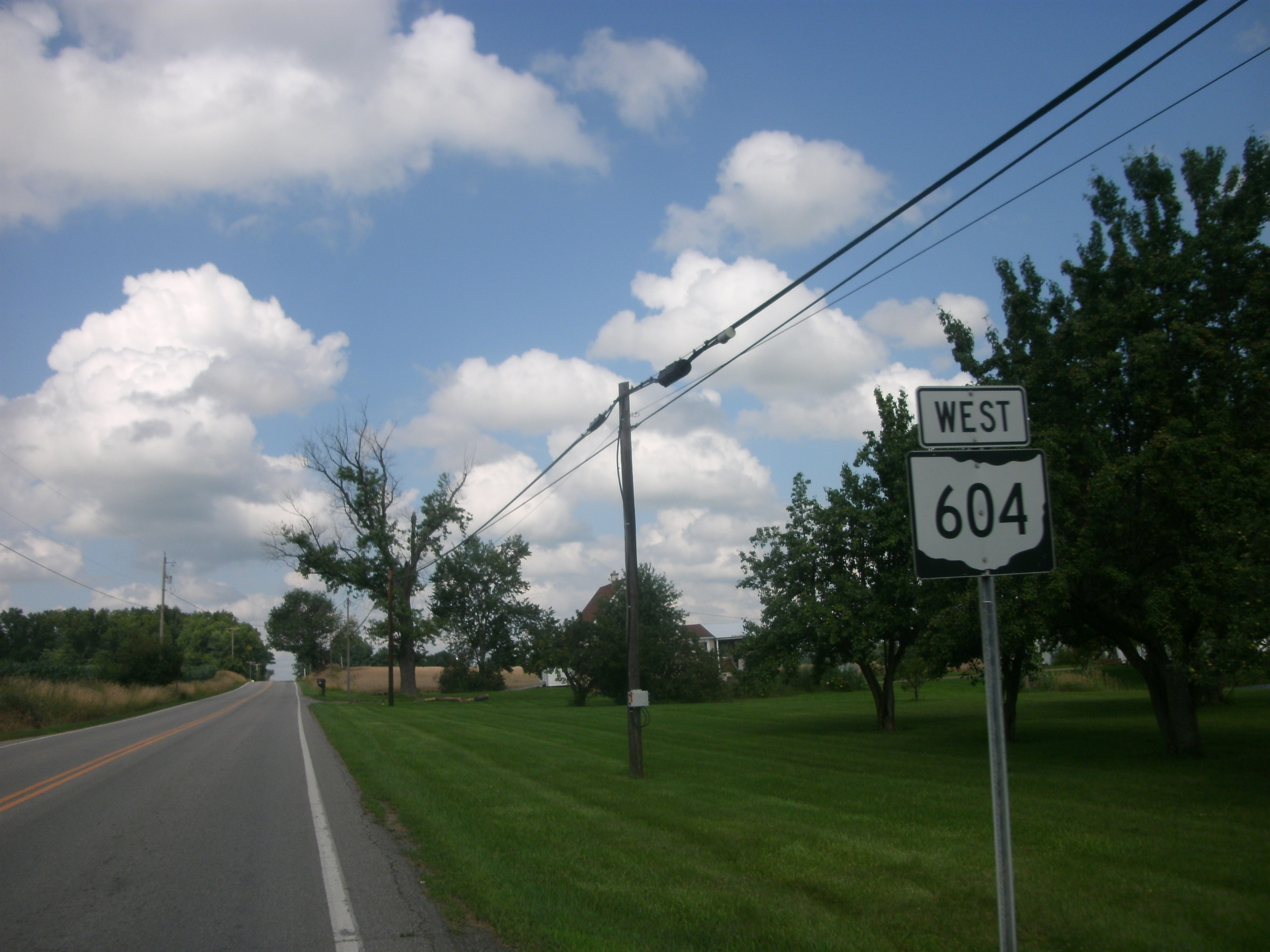
SR 604 westbound between Rittman and Congress

State Route 604 travels through the counties of Ashland and Wayne. No portion of this state highway is included within the National Highway System, a network of routes deemed most important to the country's economy, mobility and defense.

== History ==
SR 604 was first designated in 1937 along the path through northeastern Ashland County and northern Wayne County that it occupies to this day. The highway has not experienced any major changes since making its debut.

== Major intersections ==
County	Location	mi	km	Destinations	Notes
Ashland	Jackson Township	0.00	0.00	US 42 – Ashland, Medina	
Wayne	Congress Township	4.40	7.08	SR 301 south (Elyria Road) – Lattasburg	Western end of SR 301 concurrency
Wayne	Congress Township	4.52	7.27	SR 301 north (Elyria Road) – West Salem	Eastern end of SR 301 concurrency
Wayne	Congress	7.20	11.59	SR 539 north (West Salem Road)	Western end of SR 539 concurrency
Wayne	Congress	7.56	12.17	SR 539 south (Maple Street)	Eastern end of SR 539 concurrency
Wayne	Canaan Township	10.98	17.67	SR 83 (Burbank Road)	
Wayne	Canaan Township	15.77	25.38	SR 3 (Cleveland Road) – Wooster, Creston, Medina	
Wayne	Milton–Chippewa township line	23.05	37.10	SR 57 (Wadsworth Road) – Rittman, Orrville	
Wayne	Chippewa Township	24.13	38.83	SR 94 (Mt. Eaton Road) / SR 585 (Akron Road) – Wooster, Norton	
1.000 mi = 1.609 km; 1.000 km = 0.621 mi: Concurrency terminus
