= Ohio State Route 94 =

North-south state highway in Ohio, US

State Route 94

Route information
- Maintained by ODOT
- Length: 54.50 mi (87.71 km)
- Existed: 1924–present

Major junctions
- South end: US 250 / SR 241 in Mount Eaton
- US 30 in Dalton; I-76 / US 224 in Wadsworth; I-271 near Brunswick; I-480 in Cleveland
- North end: US 42 / SR 3 in Cleveland

Location
- Country: United States
- State: Ohio
- Counties: Wayne, Medina, Cuyahoga

Highway system
- Ohio State Highway System; Interstate; US; State; Scenic
← SR 93	→ SR 95

State Route 94 (SR 94) is a north–south state highway in the U.S. state of Ohio. It stretches 54 miles (87 km) from U.S. Route 250 and SR 241 in the village of Mount Eaton to U.S. Route 42 in Cleveland.

== History ==
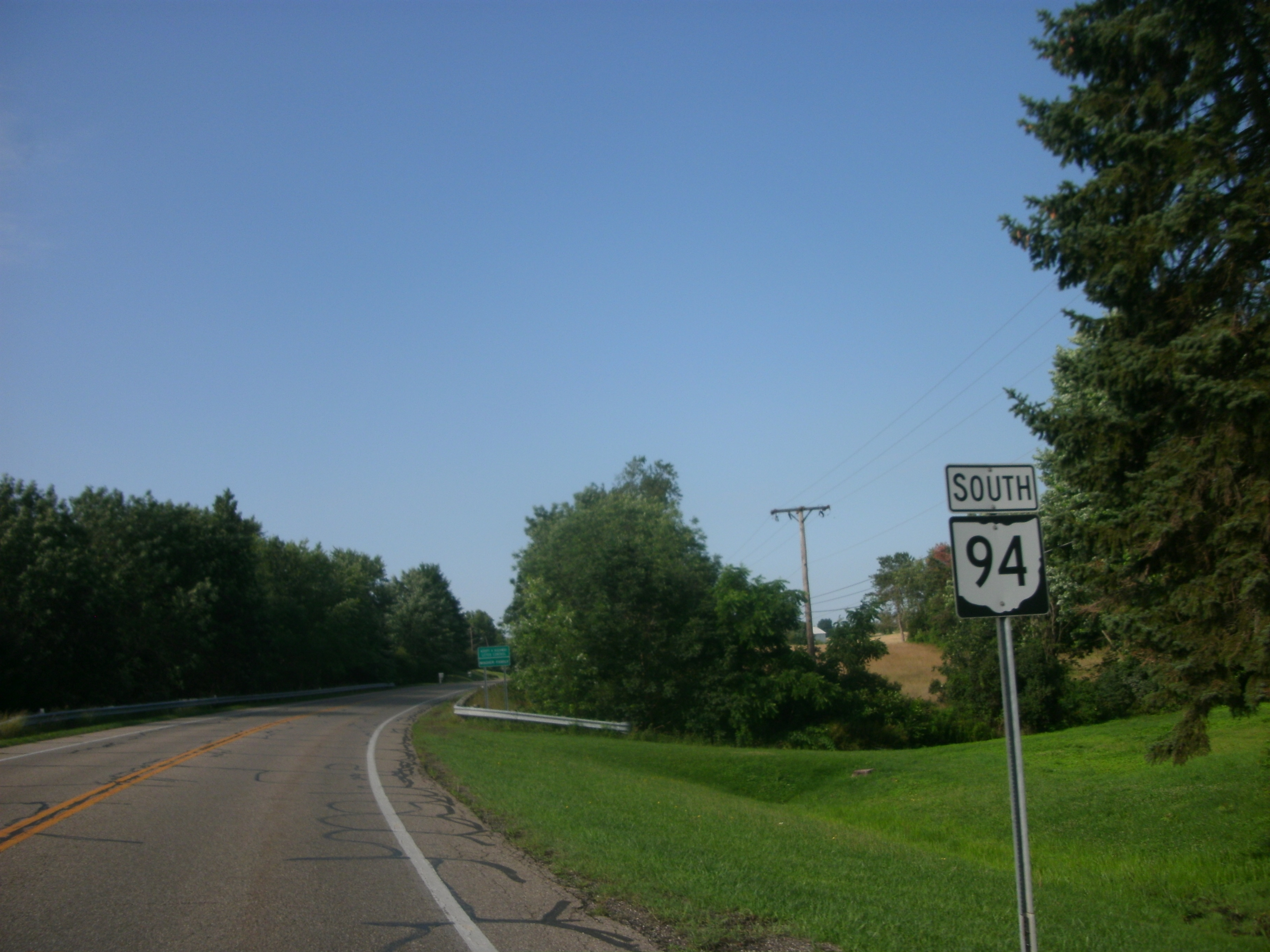
SR 94 south of Wadsworth

- 1924: State Route 94 was formed. It originally ran from Riceland, a village south of Orrville, to what was then State Route 36 (now State Route 585) north of Orrville.
- 1926: Extended north to Cleveland and its current northern terminus along a formerly unnumbered road.
- 1935: Extended again, this time southward to U.S. Route 250.
- 1938: Extended past U.S. Route 250 to the town of Fredericksburg.
- 1963: The route is truncated from Fredericksburg to U.S. Route 30 at Riceland. The former route is now Wayne County Route 94A (Carr Road).
- 1969: State Route 57 is extended along the existing route of State Route 94 from Riceland to State Route 585 (formerly State Route 5). State Route 94 is rerouted from Wadsworth to its current southern terminus at Mount Eaton.

== Major junctions ==
County	Location	mi	km	Destinations	Notes
Wayne	Mount Eaton	0.00	0.00	US 250 (Main Street) / SR 241 (Market Street) – Wooster, Massillon, New Philadelphia	
Wayne	Dalton	7.13	11.47	US 30 – Wooster, Massillon	
Wayne	Dalton	7.39	11.89	US 30 Alt. east (Main Street) / Mill Street	Southern end of US 30 Alt. concurrency
Wayne	Dalton	7.59	12.21	US 30 Alt. west (Main Street) / Church Street	Northern end of US 30 Alt. concurrency
Wayne	Chippewa Township	18.21	29.31	SR 585 south / SR 604 west – Wooster, Congress	Southern end of SR 585 concurrency; eastern terminus of SR 604
Wayne	Chippewa Township	19.07	30.69	SR 585 north – Norton	Northern end of SR 585 concurrency
Medina	Wadsworth	24.78	39.88	SR 261 east (Akron Road)	Western terminus of SR 261
Medina	Wadsworth	25.48– 25.56	41.01– 41.13	I-76 / US 224 – Akron, Lodi	Exit 9 (I-76)
Medina	Sharon Township	29.42– 29.46	47.35– 47.41	SR 162 – Lafayette, Copley	Traffic circle
Medina	Sharon–Granger township line	32.03	51.55	SR 18 – Medina, Akron	
Medina	Granger Township	35.95– 36.09	57.86– 58.08	I-271 – Erie, Pa., Columbus	Exit 3 (I-271)
Medina	Granger–Hinckley township line	36.70	59.06	SR 3 south / CR 135 (Ledge Road) – [[, Ohio|]]	Southern end of SR 3 concurrency
Medina	Hinckley Township	37.73	60.72	SR 606 (Weymouth Road / Hinckley Hills Road)	
Medina	Hinckley Township	39.23	63.13	SR 3 north (Ridge Road) / SR 303 west (Center Road) – Brunswick, Cleveland	Northern end of SR 3 concurrency, Southern end of SR 303 concurrency
Medina	Hinckley Township	40.10	64.53	SR 606 south (Hinckley Hills Road) – Hinckley Reservation	Northern terminus of SR 606
Medina	Hinckley Township	40.22	64.73	SR 303 east (Center Road) – Richfield	Northern end of SR 303 concurrency
Cuyahoga	North Royalton	45.73	73.60	SR 82 (Royalton Road)	
Cuyahoga	Parma–Cleveland city line	53.09	85.44	SR 17 (Brookpark Road) to SR 176	
Cuyahoga	Cleveland	53.24– 53.31	85.68– 85.79	I-480 – Youngstown, Toledo	Exit 16 (I-480)
Cuyahoga	Cleveland	54.50	87.71	US 42 / SR 3 (Pearl Road) / Henzrite Avenue	
1.000 mi = 1.609 km; 1.000 km = 0.621 mi: Concurrency terminus
