= Easton, Ohio =

Community in Wayne County, Ohio

Coordinates: 40°57′7″N 81°44′14″W

- Unincorporated community
- Interactive map of Easton, Ohio
- Country: United States
- State: Ohio
- County: Wayne
- Established: 1843
- Elevation: 1,000 ft (300 m)
- Time zone: UTC-5 (EST)
  - Summer (DST): UTC-4 (EDT)

Easton is an unincorporated community in Wayne County, in the U.S. state of Ohio.

== History ==
Easton was originally called Slankerville, and under the latter name was laid out in 1843. A post office called Easton was established in 1850, and remained in operation until 1905.

== Geography and transport ==
Easton lies at an elevation of around 1,000 feet (300 m) above sea level.

The town lies at the intersection and brief concurrence of Ohio State Routes 94 and 585, with Wayne County Road 5A serving as the main road within the densest part of Easton. Easton is 2.5 miles to the southwest of Doylestown, and 15 miles southwest of Akron. Easton further lies about 15 miles northeast of Wooster and about 37 miles south of downtown Cleveland. Wadsworth Municipal Airport is the nearest facility for general aviation, with Akron–Canton Airport and Cleveland Hopkins International Airport being the primary commercial air gateways for Easton.
