= Ohio State Route 76 =

State Route 76

Route information
- Maintained by ODOT

Location
- Country: United States
- State: Ohio

Highway system
- Ohio State Highway System; Interstate; US; State; Scenic
| ← I-76 | → I-77 |

In Ohio, State Route 76 may refer to:

- Interstate 76 in Ohio, the only Ohio highway numbered 76 since about 1972
- Ohio State Route 76 (1923-1960), now SR 83 (Avon Lake to Beverly) and SR 339 (Beverly to Belpre)
