= Ohio State Route 57 =

State highway in northeastern Ohio, US

State Route 57

Route information
- Maintained by ODOT
- Length: 61.22 mi (98.52 km)
- Existed: 1938–present

Major junctions
- South end: US 30 near Orrville
- SR 585 near Rittman; I-76 / US 224 near Wadsworth; US 42 / SR 3 / SR 18 in Medina; US 20 in Elyria; I-80 Toll / Ohio Turnpike in Elyria; I-90 / SR 2 in Elyria
- North end: US 6 in Lorain

Location
- Country: United States
- State: Ohio
- Counties: Wayne, Medina, Lorain

Highway system
- Ohio State Highway System; Interstate; US; State; Scenic
← SR 56	→ SR 58

State Route 57 (SR 57) is a north–south state highway in northeast Ohio. SR 57 runs from US 30 near Orrville to US 6 in Lorain, a distance of 61.2 miles (98.5 km).

== Route description ==
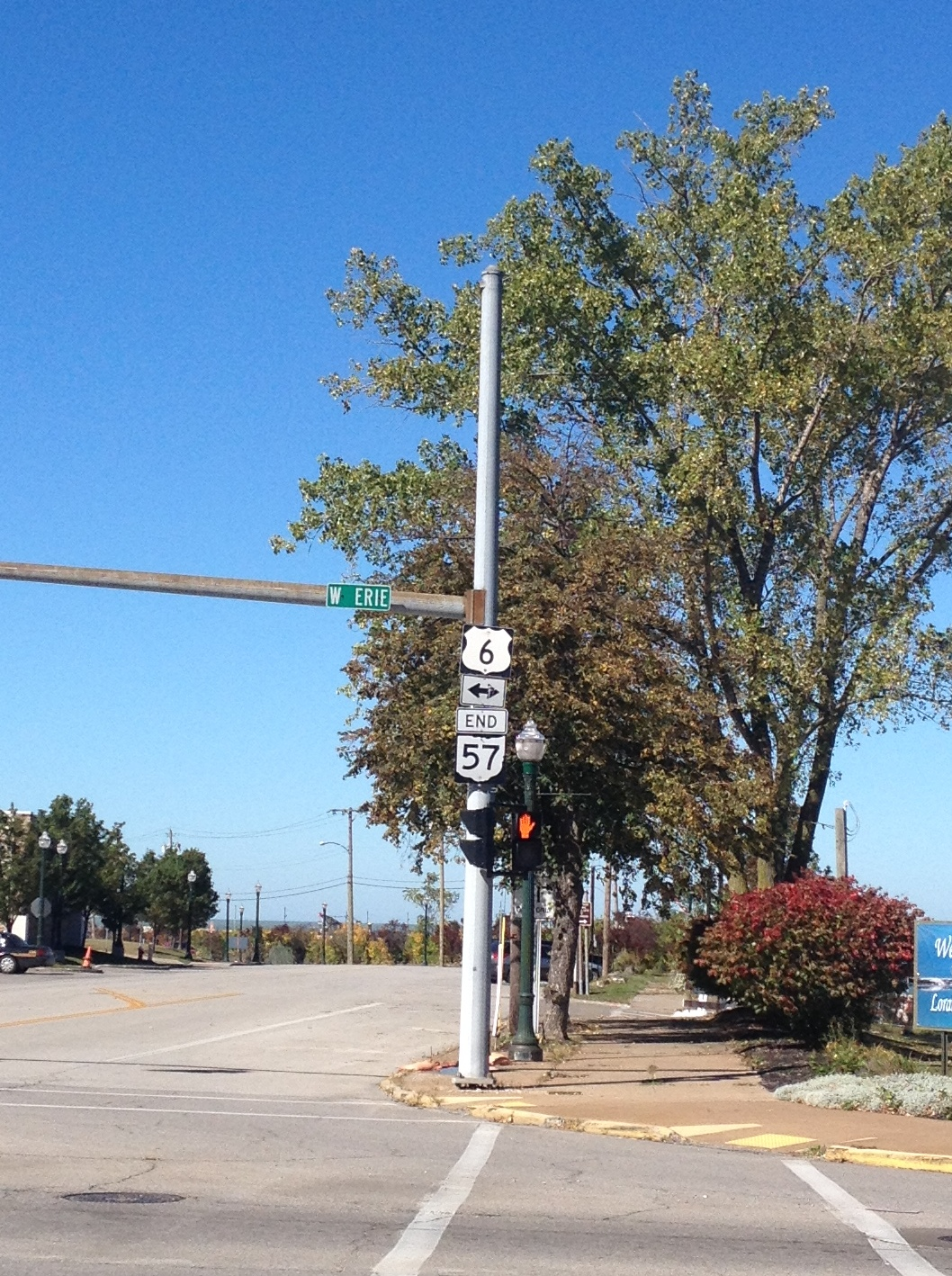
SR 57's northern terminus at US 6 in Lorain.

SR 57 begins at US 30 as a two-lane road near Orrville in Wayne County. The highway travels north through Orrville and east of Rittman, intersecting SR 585 between the two towns. Further north, SR 57 enters Medina County and runs along the western edge of Wadsworth and passes the Wadsworth Municipal Airport before intersecting I-76/US 224 (Exit 7). Now in a northwesterly direction, SR 57 enters Medina after traveling over I-71 without an interchange. In Medina, SR 57 has a short concurrency with SR 3 and a longer concurrency with SR 18, which travels through the town square and splits northwest of town, at the same location where a concurrency with SR 252 begins. This concurrency ends a mile north where SR 57 runs northwest, entering Lorain County and meeting up with SR 303 and SR 83, having concurrencies with both routes.

In Lorain County, SR 57 passes through the town of Grafton before intersecting the western terminus of SR 82 and then intersecting US 20/SR 10/SR 301 south of Elyria, which is a freeway at this location. This intersection is the western terminus of SR 10 as well as the beginning of SR 57's concurrency with US 20 and SR 301. This concurrency travels north as a four-lane divided highway around the east side of Elyria before US 20 turns off to the east but the SR 57/SR 301 concurrency continues and a concurrency with SR-113 begins at the next intersection SR-301 turns north, but SR-113 stays curving west around the north side of Elyria and traveling alongside I-80 (Ohio Turnpike) but not intersecting it, until SR 113 continues west and SR 57 turns north. Just past this intersection, SR 57 meets I-80 (Exit 145) at a double trumpet interchange and continues north, still as a four-lane divided highway, passing the Midway Mall and numerous businesses and hotels before intersecting I-90/SR 2 (Exit 145), less than a mile north of I-80. This is also I-90's first eastbound exit after splitting from its multi-state concurrency with I-80. SR 57 then runs north toward the east side of Lorain, where it ceases to be a divided highway but remains a four-lane road. Just south of a large steel plant, SR 57 turns west and then north, heading toward downtown Lorain, where it meets US 6 and ends, half a mile south of Lake Erie.

== History ==
Prior to the construction of the SR 2/Ohio Turnpike connector around 1976, I-90 traffic had to use SR 57 to access the Turnpike. In 2003 the loop from SR 57 southbound to I-90/SR 2 eastbound in this interchange was removed and replaced by a left turn to simplify traffic movements on SR 57, and the opposite loop had been removed by 2004 to make it a six-ramp partial cloverleaf interchange.

=== Rebuilding and widening program ===
The improvement of the SR 57 corridor between the Ohio Turnpike and I-90 in Elyria is a long-awaited project to improve safety and reduce congestion in this heavily commercial area. This stretch of SR 57 contains a disorganized cluster of roads and exits and has been said to be a high-crash zone, according to city and Ohio Department of Transportation District 3 officials. This project will modify the existing SR 57 interchange with I-90 in Elyria as well as remove the existing 49th Street bridge over SR 57. SR 57 will be widened to six lanes between the Ohio Turnpike and I-90, and Midway Mall Boulevard will also be widened. The SR 57 and I-90 interchange will be converted to a full diamond interchange with signals.

== Major junctions ==
County	Location	mi	km	Destinations	Notes
Wayne	East Union–Sugar Creek township line	0.00	0.00	US 30 – Massillion, Wooster	
Wayne	Milton–Chippewa township line	8.91	14.34	SR 585 – Wooster, Barberton	
Wayne	Milton–Chippewa township line	10.32	16.61	SR 604 – Congress	
Wayne	Chippewa Township	12.96– 13.01	20.86– 20.94	CR 57A (Rittman Road) – Rittman	Interchange
Medina	Wadsworth Township	15.77	25.38	CR 97 (Greenwich Road) – Wadsworth	Interchange
Medina	Wadsworth Township	16.38– 16.52	26.36– 26.59	I-76 / US 224 – Akron, Lodi	Exit 7 (I-76)
Medina	Montville Township	23.27	37.45	SR 162 – Lafayette, Sharon Center	
Medina	Medina	25.86	41.62	SR 3 north (Washington Street) / SR 18 east	
Medina	Medina	25.94	41.75	SR 3 / SR 18 (Liberty Street) / Broadway Street	Southern end of SR 3 / SR 18 concurrencies
Medina	Medina	26.00	41.84	US 42 / SR 3 south (Court Street)	Northern end of SR 3 concurrency
Medina	York Township	29.98	48.25	SR 18 west / SR 252 begins / CR 24 (Columbia Road) – Norwalk	Northern end of SR 18 concurrency; southern end of SR 252 concurrency
Medina	York Township	30.91	49.74	SR 252 north / CR 65 (Spieth Road) – Columbia Hills Corners	Northern end of SR 252 concurrency
Lorain	Grafton Township	36.71	59.08	SR 303 east / CR 59 (Cowley Road) – Valley City	Southern end of SR 303 concurrency
Lorain	Grafton Township	38.78	62.41	SR 83 south / SR 303 west – Litchfield, LaGrange	Northern end of SR 303 concurrency; southern end of SR 83 concurrency
Lorain	Grafton Township	40.34	64.92	SR 83 north / CR 151 (Grafton Eastern Road) – North Ridgeville	Northern end of SR 83 concurrency
Lorain	Carlisle–Eaton township line	45.67	73.50	SR 82 east – Strongsville	Western terminus of SR 82
Lorain	Eaton Township	46.76– 46.96	75.25– 75.57	US 20 west / SR 10 east / SR 301 south – Cleveland, Norwalk, Columbus	Interchange; southern end of US 20 / SR 301 concurrencies; western terminus of SR 10
Lorain	Elyria	50.08	80.60	US 20 east (Cleveland Street) / SR 113 east – Painesville	Northern end of US 20 concurrency; southern end of SR 113 concurrency
Lorain	Elyria	50.70	81.59	SR 301 north (Abbe Road) – Erie, PA	Northern end of SR 301 concurrency
Lorain	Elyria	52.77	84.93	SR 113 west (John F. Kennedy Memorial Parkway) / Lorain Boulevard – Huron	Northern end of SR 113 concurrency
Lorain	Elyria	53.29– 53.51	85.76– 86.12	I-80 Toll / Ohio Turnpike – Toledo, Youngstown	Exit 145 (Ohio Tpk.)
Lorain	Elyria–Elyria Township municipal line	54.12– 54.45	87.10– 87.63	I-90 / SR 2 – Sandusky, Cleveland	Exit 145 (I-90)
Lorain	Sheffield Township	55.23	88.88	SR 254 east (North Ridge Road) – Euclid	Western terminus of SR 254
Lorain	Lorain	59.87	96.35	SR 611 (West 21st Street) – Toledo, Youngstown	
Lorain	Lorain	61.22	98.52	US 6 (West Erie Avenue) / LECT – Sandusky, Cleveland	
1.000 mi = 1.609 km; 1.000 km = 0.621 mi: Concurrency terminus; Tolled
