= Brecksville-Northfield High Level Bridge =

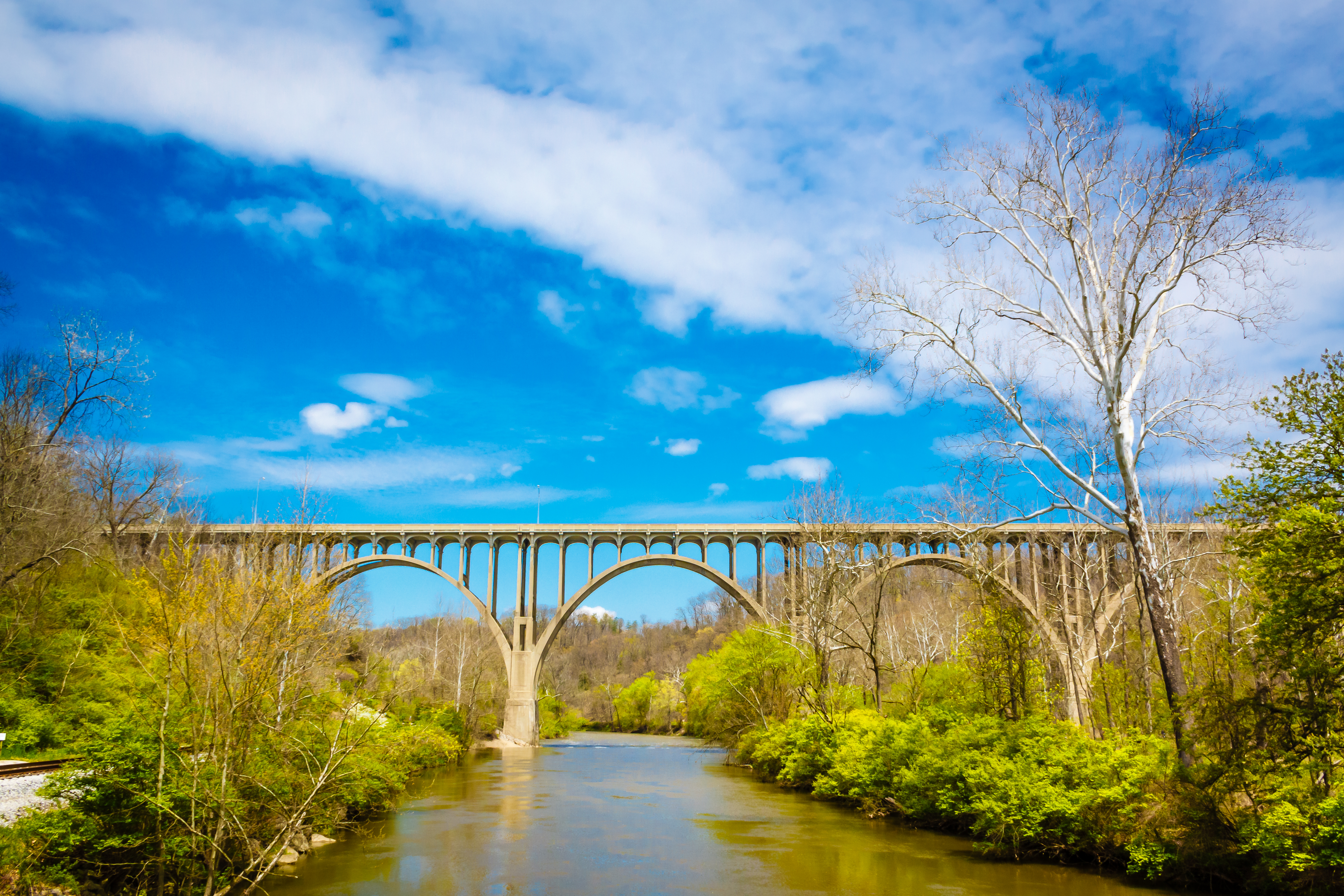
- Bridge in 2016
- Coordinates: 41.3214434°N 81.5873437°W
- Carries: SR 82
- Crosses: Cuyahoga River; Cuyahoga Valley Scenic Railroad; Ohio and Erie Canal
- Owner: Ohio Department of Transportation (ODOT)
- Maintained by: ODOT
- ID number: 7706871

Characteristics
- Design: Deck arch (open spandrel)
- Material: Concrete
- Total length: 345 meters (1,132 ft)
- Height: 44.3 meters (145 ft)
- No. of spans: 5

History
- Designer: Alfred M. Felgate
- Fabrication by: Highway Construction Co.
- Opened: 1931
- Renovated: 1990–1991
- Replaces: Station Road Bridge

Location
- Interactive map of Brecksville-Northfield High Level Bridge

The Brecksville-Northfield High Level Bridge is a bridge in Greater Cleveland, Ohio, U.S., connecting Brecksville in Cuyahoga County with Sagamore Hills Township in Summit County. It is located in the Cuyahoga Valley National Park.

In 2012, five men whom authorities identified as "self-described anarchists" were arrested and accused of planning to blow up the bridge. The five were accused of planting what they thought were explosives and attempting to detonate it with a cell phone. Following guilty pleas and one conviction, the men were sentenced between November 2012 and October 2013.

A project to replace portions of the bridge began in 2025. In preparation for this project, workers discovered a crack in a bridge column, prompting a short-term closure of the bridge.

== See also ==
- List of bridges documented by the Historic American Engineering Record in Ohio
