= Ohio State Route 606 =

State highway in Medina County, Ohio, US

State Route 606

Route information
- Maintained by ODOT
- Length: 4.26 mi (6.86 km)
- Existed: 1937–present

Major junctions
- South end: SR 3 near Medina
- North end: SR 94 / SR 303 near Richfield

Location
- Country: United States
- State: Ohio
- Counties: Medina

Highway system
- Ohio State Highway System; Interstate; US; State; Scenic
← SR 605	→ SR 607

State Route 606 (SR 606) is a north–south state highway in the northeastern quadrant of the U.S. state of Ohio. The southern terminus of SR 606 is at a T-intersection with SR 3 approximately 4.50 miles (7.24 km) northeast of Medina. The highway's northern terminus is at another T-intersection, this time with the SR 94/SR 303 concurrency nearly 3.25 miles (5.23 km) west of Richfield.

SR 606, which was established in the late 1930s, is a two-lane route located in the northeastern Medina County township of Hinckley. The highway serves the popular Hinckley Reservation, home to the annual "Buzzard Day," which marks the annual arrival of large numbers of buzzards to the area on March 15 of every year.

== Route description ==
All of SR 606 is situated within Hinckley Township, Medina County. This state highway is not included as a component of the National Highway System.

SR 606 commences at a T-intersection with SR 3 at the boundary of Hinckley and Granger Townships approximately 4.50 miles (7.24 km) northeast of Medina, and 1 mile (1.6 km) northeast of the SR 3 interchange off of Interstate 71, its exit 222. The highway immediately crosses into Hinckley Township as it departs to the northeast from the SR 3 intersection. Starting out, SR 606 is bounded by open fields on the southeast side and houses on the northwest side. The highway crosses Stony Hill Road, then passes amidst a stretch where both sides of the roadway feature a mix of residences and woods, with a little bit of open space mixed in. SR 606 bends east and intersects SR 3 again, this time joined by SR 94. SR 606 crosses the road, and then curves back to the northeast. The area the route travels through is now more heavily wooded than previously, but a number of homes continue to dot the landscape. It curves to the east-northeast, passes Kellogg Road, then turns back to the northeast as it passes by the Hinckley Reservation. After intersecting Bellus Road, SR 606 bends to the north, and then to the northwest, prior to arriving at its endpoint at a T-intersection with the SR 94/SR 303 concurrency about 3.25 miles (5.23 km) west of Richfield.

== History ==
SR 606 was designated in 1937. The SR 606 designation was applied to the same stretch of highway through northeastern Medina County that it utilizes to this day. There have been no changes of major significance to the routing of this state highway since its inception.

== Major intersections ==
The entire route is in Hinckley Township, Medina County.

mi	km	Destinations	Notes
0.00	0.00	SR 3 (Weymouth Road / Ledge Road)	
1.94	3.12	SR 3 / SR 94 (Ridge Road)	
4.26	6.86	SR 94 / SR 303 (Center Road)	
1.000 mi = 1.609 km; 1.000 km = 0.621 mi
