= Midway Mall =

Shopping mall in Elyria, Ohio, US

Coordinates: 41.39675°N 82.11188°W

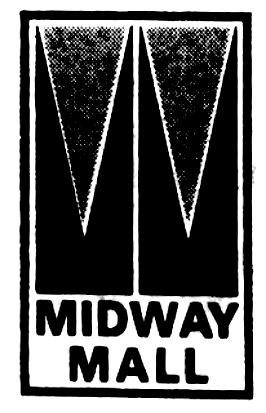

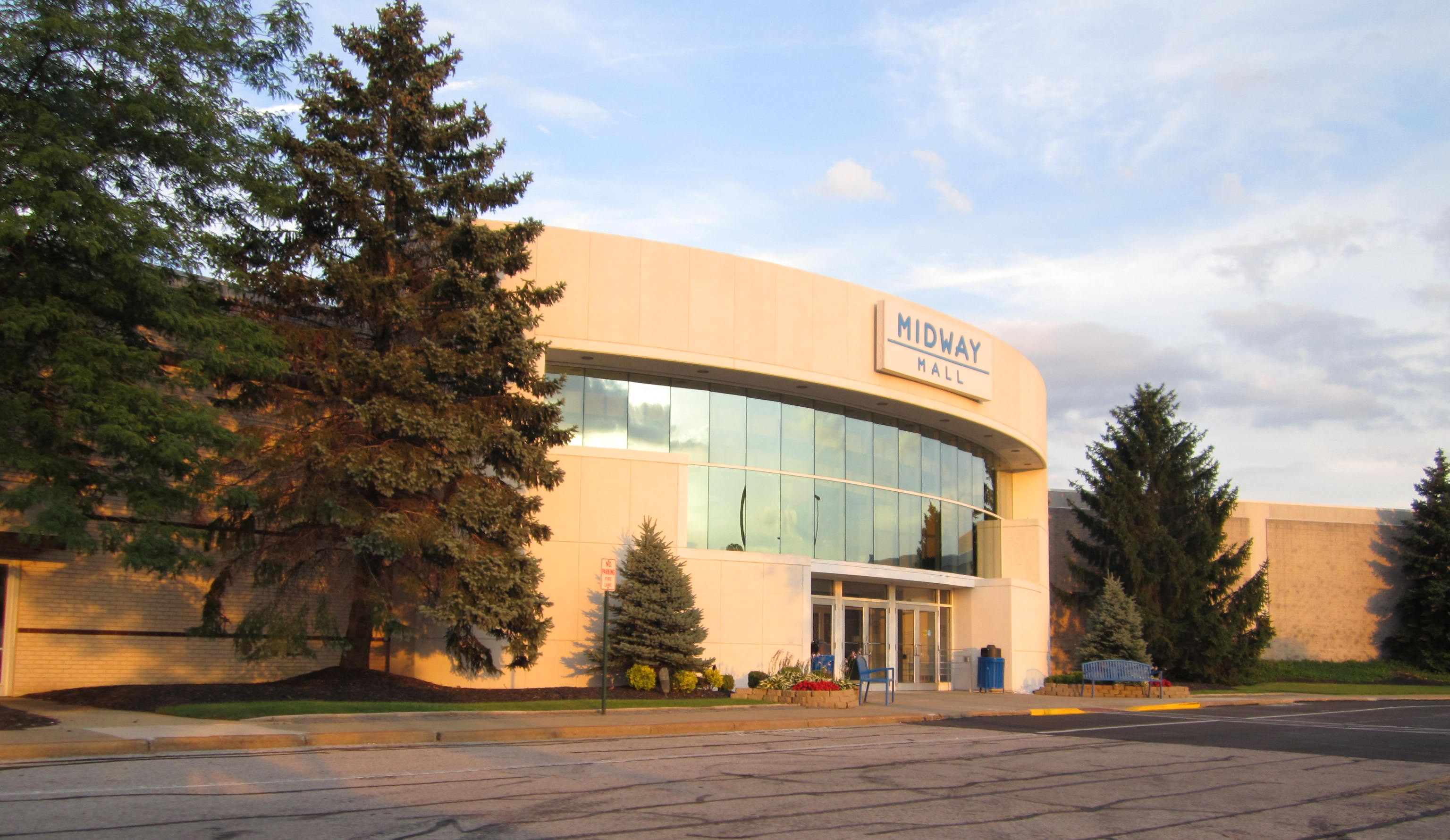
- Entrance to Midway Mall, July 2013
- Location: Elyria, Ohio, U.S.
- Opened: September 29, 1966
- Previous names: Westfield Shoppingtown Midway
- Developer: Richard E. Jacobs Company
- Manager: Lorain County Port Authority
- Owner: Lorain County Port Authority
- Num. of stores: 120 at peak
- Num. of anchor tenants: 0 (6 at peak)
- Floor area: 940,174 sq ft (87,345 m^{2})
- Floors: 1 (2 in former Dillard’s, former JCPenney and former Sears)

Midway Mall is a 940,174 sq ft (87,345 m^{2}) square foot regional shopping mall in Elyria, Ohio, United States. Lorain County's only enclosed regional mall, it is located on Ohio State Route 57 near Interstate 80 (the Ohio Turnpike) and Interstate 90.

== History ==
Visconsi-Mead-Jacobs (later known as Jacobs Visconsi Jacobs), a retail development firm co-founded by Cleveland, Ohio developer Richard E. Jacobs, first announced plans for Midway Mall in June 1964. The company chose a site off the Ohio Turnpike in the city of Elyria, Ohio, to develop an approximately 600,000-square-foot (56,000 m^{2}) shopping mall with two anchor stores. These stores would be Sears and Higbee's, respectively occupying about 180,000 square feet (17,000 m^{2}) and 140,000 square feet (13,000 m^{2}). Midway Mall opened in September 1966 and JCPenney opened the following year.

In 1982, it was the site of a mass shooting when Clifton Snowden shot and killed his wife, her mother, and their two daughters, in the parking lot before committing suicide. It was believed to be have been over a custody dispute.

The mall was renovated in 1989. When completed in 1990, there was a new wing with a new May Company Store, several stores, and a new food court. Higbee's became Dillard's after being acquired in 1992. In 1995, Best Buy replaced Woolworth, which closed in 1994. The May Company store became Kaufmann's in 1993, then Macy's in 2006.

In 2001, the Jacobs Group sold it as part of a divestment program to The Westfield Group, which renamed it Westfield Shoppingtown Midway. In spring 2006, Westfield announced that the mall did not fulfill their "strategic plan" and sold it in May 2006 to Centro Properties Group, which reverted the name to Midway Mall. Several years later, the mall was managed by The Woodmont Company.

Dillard's closed in 2007, Macy's in 2016, and Sears in 2017. In 2018, Johnny K's Power Sports moved into the former Macy's space. The mall was then owned and managed by Namdar Realty Group. JCPenney closed in 2019 as part of a plan to close 27 stores nationwide. After BestBuy closed in 2020, Dunham's Sports and Johnny K's Power Sports were the mall's remaining anchors.

In 2023, the Lorain County Port Authority voted to buy and develop the mall site, and in 2024 the port authority named Industrial Commercial Properties to redevelop the mall into an industrial park. The port authority sold the mall to Industrial Realty Group in 2026.
