= Ohio State Route 301 =

State highway in northern Ohio, US

State Route 301

Route information
- Maintained by ODOT
- Length: 45.33 mi (72.95 km)
- Existed: 1932–present

Major junctions
- South end: SR 302 in Lattasburg
- I-71 in Congress Township; US 42 in West Salem; US 224 in Homerville; US 20 / SR 10 near Elyria
- North end: US 6 in Sheffield Lake

Location
- Country: United States
- State: Ohio
- Counties: Wayne, Medina, Lorain

Highway system
- Ohio State Highway System; Interstate; US; State; Scenic
← SR 300	→ SR 302

State Route 301 (SR 301) is a 45.33-mile (72.95 km) long north–south state highway in the northern portion of the U.S. state of Ohio. The southern terminus of SR 301 is at SR 302 in Chester Township nearly 5.50 miles (8.85 km) south of West Salem. Its northern terminus is at U.S. Route 6 (US 6) in Sheffield Lake.

== Route description ==
SR 301 travels through northwestern Wayne County, western Medina County and central Lorain County. No segment of this route is included as a part of the National Highway System (NHS). The NHS is a network of highways defined as being most important for the economy, mobility and defense of the nation.

== History ==
The SR 301 designation was applied in 1932. Originally, the highway was routed along a short portion of its present alignment, running from US 42 in West Salem, to its junction with US 224, then known as SR 17.

In 1937, SR 301 took on much of its current form when it was extended on the south end to SR 302 approximately 5.50 miles (8.85 km) south of West Salem, and on the north end through western Medina County and central Lorain County to US 6 (at the time also joined by SR 2 in Sheffield Lake.

== Major intersections ==
County	Location	mi	km	Destinations	Notes
Wayne	Chester Township	0.00	0.00	SR 302	Southern terminus of SR 301.
Wayne	Congress Township	2.55	4.10	SR 604	
Wayne	Congress Township	2.67	4.30	SR 604	
Wayne	Congress Township	3.89	6.26	I-71	SR 301 only provides access to I-71 south and I-71 north only provides access to SR 301.
Wayne	West Salem	6.40	10.30	SR 539	Western terminus of SR 539.
Wayne	West Salem	6.47	10.41	US 42	
Medina	Homerville	10.40	16.74	US 224	Junction with US 224 eastbound.
Medina	Homerville	10.41	16.75	US 224	Junction with US 224 westbound.
Medina	Spencer	15.44	24.85	SR 162	
Lorain	Penfield Township	20.19	32.49	SR 18	
Lorain	LaGrange	24.95	40.15	SR 303	
Lorain	Carlisle Township	30.71	49.42	US 20; SR 10	Beginning of US 20 concurrency. Junction with SR 10 Eastbound.
Lorain	Carlisle Township	33.43	53.80	US 20	End of US 20 concurrency.
Lorain	Carlisle Township	33.67	54.19	SR 57	Beginning of SR 57 concurrency.
Lorain	Elyria	37.53	60.40	SR 57	End of SR 57 concurrency.
Lorain	Sheffield	40.32	64.89	SR 254	
Lorain	Sheffield	43.08	69.33	SR 611	
Lorain	Sheffield Lake	45.33	72.95	US 6 / LECT	Northern terminus of SR 301.
1.000 mi = 1.609 km; 1.000 km = 0.621 mi: Concurrency terminus
