= Drakesburg, Ohio =

Unincorporated community in Ohio, U.S.

Coordinates: 41°14′08″N 81°08′04″W

Drakesburg is an unincorporated community in Portage County, in the U.S. state of Ohio. It is located in Freedom Township at the intersection of Nichols Road and state routes 303 and 88.

== History ==
The community derives its name from Orsamus Drake, the proprietor of a local tavern.
