= Ohio State Route 3 =

State highway in Ohio, US

State Route 3
- Route of SR 3 highlighted in red

Route information
- Maintained by ODOT
- Length: 248.5 mi (399.9 km)
- Existed: 1923–present

Major junctions
- South end: US 22 / US 27 / US 42 / US 52 / US 127 / SR 264 in Cincinnati
- I-71 (numerous locations); I-275 in Montgomery; US 35 / US 62 in Washington Court House; I-270 in Grove City; I-70 in Columbus; US 23 / US 33 in Columbus; US 40 / SR 16 in Columbus; I-670 in Columbus; US 30 / US 250 in Wooster; I-76 / US 224 in Seville
- North end: US 6 / US 20 / US 42 at Public Square in Cleveland

Location
- Country: United States
- State: Ohio
- Counties: Hamilton, Warren, Clinton, Fayette, Madison, Pickaway, Franklin, Delaware, Knox, Ashland, Holmes, Wayne, Medina, Cuyahoga

Highway system
- Ohio State Highway System; Interstate; US; State; Scenic
← SR 2	→ SR 4
← SR 199	SR 200	→ SR 201

State Route 3 (SR 3) is a major north–south (physically northeast-southwest) highway in Ohio which leads from Cincinnati to Cleveland by way of Columbus. It is the second longest state route in Ohio. For this reason, the road is also known as the 3-C Highway, a designation which antedates the Ohio state highway system. It is the only state route to enter all three of Ohio's largest cities, though it has largely been bypassed by Interstate 71 (I-71).

== Route ==
The route's southern terminus is in downtown Cincinnati at the U.S. Route 27 (US 27)/US 52/US 127 concurrency, which is also the western terminus of US 22. SR 3 and US 22 share the same path for nearly 70 miles (110 km), parting ways in the city of Washington Court House, where SR 3 is joined with US 62. This concurrency runs nearly 40 miles (64 km) to Columbus.

From there, SR 3 continues solo to Sunbury, where it joins US 36 for just over 24 miles (39 km) until it reaches Mount Vernon. SR 3 ends in Cleveland at Public Square, with the last several miles concurrent with US 42 from Parma. It is one of nine other routes to enter downtown Cleveland at Public Square.

== History ==
- 1923 – Original route established; originally followed its current alignment (more or less) from Cincinnati to 6 miles (9.7 km) north of Loudonville, the SR 226 alignment from 6 miles (9.7 km) north of Loudonville to 2 miles (3.2 km) south of Wooster, its old alignment from 2 miles (3.2 km) south of Wooster to Medina, and US 42's alignment from Medina to Cleveland.
- 1927 – 6 miles (9.7 km) north of Loudonville to 2 miles (3.2 km) south of Wooster rerouted to current alignment, along former SR 250; original alignment certified as SR 250; Medina-to-Parma routing changed to current alignment, and former alignment here certified as US 42.
- 1932 – Alignment from Cincinnati to Washington Court House dually certified with US 22; alignment from Washington Court House to Columbus dually certified with US 62.
- 1938 – Medina-Parma alignment changed to the pre-1926 routing and dually certified with US 42; previous alignment signed SR 200 until 1939.
- 1939 – Medina-Parma alignment switched back to current alignment.
- 1961 – SR 3 routed to new freeway alignment from Harrisburg to Columbus.
- 1962 – Harrisburg-Columbus alignment dually certified as I-71.
- 1967 – Reverted to US 62 alignment from Harrisburg to Columbus.

== Major intersections ==
County	Location	mi	km	Destinations	Notes
Hamilton	Cincinnati	0.00	0.00	US 27 / US 42 / US 52 / US 127; US 22 / SR 264	SR 3 begins northbound concurrent with US 22 (also its western terminus), US 27, US 42, US 52 and US 127; eastern terminus of SR 264 (eastbound)
Hamilton	Cincinnati	0.09	0.14	US 27 / US 42 / US 52 / US 127 / SR 264	Southbound lanes of US 27, US 42, and US 127 as well as eastbound US 52 enter from the east; westbound SR 264 crosses from east to west.
Hamilton	Cincinnati	0.17	0.27	US 27 / US 52 / US 127	US 22/US 42/SR 3 leaves northbound lanes of concurrency, heading east; northbound US 27/US 127 as well as westbound US 52 continue north.
Hamilton	Cincinnati	0.25	0.40	US 27 / US 42 / US 52 / US 127; SR 264	Southbound lanes of US 27, US 42, and US 127 as well as eastbound US 52 and westbound SR 264 cross from north to south.
Hamilton	Cincinnati	0.33	0.53	US 42	Northbound lanes of US 42 leave US 22/SR 3 to the north.
Hamilton	Cincinnati	1.45	2.33	I-71	Ramps from eastbound US 22/SR 3 concurrency to northbound I-71 and southbound I-71 to westbound US 22/SR 3 only; I-71 Exit 2.
Hamilton	Cincinnati	4.46	7.18	I-71	Northbound exit/southbound entrance to/from interstate only; I-71 Exit 5.
Hamilton	Norwood	6.19	9.96	SR 561	SR 561 joins from the southeast
Hamilton	Norwood	6.22	10.01	SR 562 (Norwood Lateral Expressway)	Full-access interchange with US 22/SR 3/SR 561.
Hamilton	Norwood	6.29	10.12	SR 561	SR 561 leaves to the northwest.
Hamilton	Cincinnati	11.41	18.36	I-71	Full-access interchange; I-71 Exit 12.
Hamilton	Montgomery	13.30	21.40	SR 126 (Ronald Reagan Cross County Highway)	Eastern terminus of expressway; SR 126 joins from the west.
Hamilton	Montgomery	13.57	21.84	SR 126	SR 126 leaves to the east.
Hamilton	Sycamore Township	16.15	25.99	I-275	Full-access interchange; I-275 Exit 50.
Warren	Hamilton Township	24.69	39.73	SR 48	
Warren	Morrow	30.02	48.31	SR 123	SR 123 joins from the north.
Warren	Salem Township	31.75	51.10	SR 123	SR 123 leaves to the south.
Warren	Washington Township	37.59	60.50	SR 350	
Clinton	Adams Township	41.73	67.16	SR 380	Southern terminus of SR 380.
Clinton	Wilmington	47.20	75.96	SR 73	SR 73 joins from the northwest.
Clinton	Wilmington	48.06	77.35	US 68 / SR 134	
Clinton	Wilmington	50.63	81.48	SR 73	SR 73 leaves to the south.
Clinton	Richland Township	56.81	91.43	SR 72	
Clinton	Sabina	58.95	94.87	SR 729	
Fayette	Union Township	68.58	110.37	US 35	Full-access interchange with US 35 expressway, shared with US 62 to the south.
Fayette	Washington Court House	69.75	112.25	US 62 / SR 41	US 62 joins from the southwest; SR 41 joins from the south.
Fayette	Washington Court House	70.23	113.02	SR 41	SR 41 leaves to the northwest; former southeastbound alignment of US 35.
Fayette	Washington Court House	70.38	113.27	US 22	US 22 leaves to the east.
Fayette	Union Township	74.85	120.46	SR 38	Southern terminus of SR 38.
Madison	Mount Sterling	85.63	137.81	SR 207	SR 207 joins from the south.
Madison	Mount Sterling	85.89	138.23	SR 56 / SR 207	SR 207 leaves northwest concurrent with SR 56; SR 56 continues southeast.
Pickaway	Darby Township	94.08	151.41	SR 762	Northern terminus of SR 762
Franklin	Pleasant Township	96.18	154.79	I-71	Full-access interchange; I-71 Exit 94.
Franklin	Pleasant Township	97.72	157.27	SR 665	
Franklin	Jackson Township	102.66	165.22	I-270	Full-access interchange; I-270 Exit 2.
Franklin	Columbus	106.46	171.33	I-70	Full-access via side streets to the south and north of crossing; I-70 Exit 98A-B.
Franklin	Columbus	107.98	173.78	SR 315	Full-access interchange from SR 315.
Franklin	Columbus	109.15	175.66	US 23 south / US 33 south	
Franklin	Columbus	109.25	175.82	US 23 north / US 33 north	Southern terminus of US 23/US 33/US 62/SR 3 concurrency
Franklin	Columbus	109.68	176.51	US 40 / US 62 / SR 16	US 62 leaves to the east, concurrent with US 40 and SR 16 which continue west
Franklin	Columbus	109.88	176.83	US 23 / US 33	US 23 leaves to the north; US 33 leaves to the west 0.1 mi. later
Franklin	Columbus	110.62	178.03	I-670	I-670 Exits 4C (eastbound) and 5 (westbound); westbound exit/entrance via Jack Gibbs Blvd.
Franklin	Minerva Park	118.93	191.40	SR 161 (Dublin-Granville Road)	Full-access interchange with expressway.
Franklin	Blendon Township	120.39	193.75	I-270	Full-access interchange; I-270 Exit 29.
Delaware	Sunbury	131.47	211.58	US 36 / SR 37 / SR 61	US 36 joins from the northwest concurrent with SR 37; SR 37 continues to the southeast; SR 61 begins concurrent with US 36/SR 3 concurrency.
Delaware	Sunbury	131.90	212.27	SR 61	SR 61 leaves to the north
Knox	Centerburg	142.13	228.74	SR 314	Southern terminus of SR 314.
Knox	Hilliar Township	143.22	230.49	SR 657	Western terminus of SR 657.
Knox	Clinton Township	154.89	249.27	SR 229	SR 229 joins from the west.
Knox	Mount Vernon	155.85	250.82	SR 13	SR 13 southbound directional alternate joins from the north.
Knox	Mount Vernon	155.97	251.01	SR 13 / SR 229	SR 13 southbound directional alternate and SR 229 eastbound leave to the south (concurrency).
Knox	Mount Vernon	156.11	251.23	US 36 / SR 229	US 36 leaves to the east; US 36/SR 229 westbound directional alternate enters from the east.
Knox	Mount Vernon	156.16	251.32	US 36 / SR 229	US 36/SR 229 westbound directional alternate leaves to the west.
Knox	Mount Vernon	156.18	251.35	SR 13	Northbound SR 13 crosses from east to west.
Knox	Monroe Township	158.92	255.76	SR 768	Northern terminus of SR 768.
Knox	Brown Township	170.64	274.62	SR 205	Northern terminus of SR 205.
Ashland	Hanover Township	176.38	283.86	SR 97	Eastern terminus of SR 97.
Ashland	Loudonville	178.98	288.04	SR 39	SR 39 joins from the west.
Ashland	Loudonville	179.13	288.28	SR 39 / SR 60	SR 39 leaves to the east concurrent with SR 60; SR 3/SR 60 concurrency continues north.
Ashland	Loudonville	179.30	288.56	SR 60	SR 60 leaves to the north.
Holmes	Washington Township	184.19	296.43	SR 179 / SR 226	SR 226 begins east, concurrent with SR 179, which continues north.
Wayne	Wooster Township	195.86	315.21	SR 226	Northern terminus of SR 226; former northbound alignment of SR 3.
Wayne	Wooster Township	196.43	316.12	SR 95	Eastern terminus of SR 95
Wayne	Wooster	197.95	318.57	US 30 / US 250 (Lincoln Way)	SR 3 joins expressway via full-access interchange; former northbound alignment of SR 3.
Wayne	Wooster	198.62	319.65	SR 302	Full-access interchange.
Wayne	Wooster Township	199.57	321.18	US 250	Full-access interchange (direct ramp eastbound; westbound via Pittsburgh Avenue)
Wayne	Wooster Township	200.15	322.11	US 30	US 30 leaves to the east at full-access interchange.
Wayne	Wooster Township	200.33	322.40	SR 83	SR 83 joins from the south at full-access interchange.
Wayne	Wooster	201.08	323.61	SR 585	Southern terminus of SR 585 (former cross-alignment) at full-access interchange.
Wayne	Wooster	203.26	327.12	SR 83	SR 3 leaves expressway; SR 83 continues northwest; former cross-alignment of SR 3.
Wayne	Canaan Township	210.85	339.33	SR 604	
Medina	Seville	217.95	350.76	I-76 / US 224	Full-access interchange; I-76 Exit 2.
Medina	Montville Township	222.56	358.18	SR 162	SR 162 joins from the west.
Medina	Montville Township	223.05	358.96	SR 162	SR 162 leaves to the east.
Medina	Medina	224.96	362.04	US 42 / SR 57	US 42 joins from the west; SR 57 joins from the east.
Medina	Medina	225.22	362.46	SR 18	SR 18 eastbound lanes cross.
Medina	Medina	225.30	362.59	US 42 / SR 18 / SR 57	US 42 leaves to the north; SR 18 westbound lanes, concurrent with SR 57, leave to the west.
Medina	Medina	225.36	362.68	SR 18 / SR 57	SR 18 westbound lanes, concurrent with SR 57, join from the south.
Medina	Medina Township	231.04	371.82	I-71	Full-access interchange; I-71 Exit 222.
Medina	Hinckley Township	232.03	373.42	SR 606	Western terminus of SR 606.
Medina	Hinckley Township	233.63	375.99	SR 94	SR 94 joins from the south.
Medina	Hinckley Township	234.66	377.65	SR 606	
Medina	Hinckley Township	236.16	380.06	SR 94 / SR 303	SR 94 leaves to the east concurrent with SR 303 which continues west.
Cuyahoga	North Royalton	241.55	388.74	SR 82	
Cuyahoga	Parma	248.50	399.92	US 42	Southern end of US 42 concurrency
Cuyahoga	Cleveland	250.23	402.71	SR 94	SR 94 northern terminus.
Cuyahoga	Cleveland	254.60	409.74	US 6 Alt. / US 6 / US 20	Southern end of US 6 / US 20 concurrency; eastern terminus of US 6 Alt.
Cuyahoga	Cleveland	255.48	411.16	US 6 / US 20 / US 42 / Public Square	Northern terminus of SR 3; northern terminus of US 6 / US 20 concurrency; eastern terminus of US 42 (north end of concurrency)
1.000 mi = 1.609 km; 1.000 km = 0.621 mi: Concurrency terminus
