= Ohio State Route 82 =

State highway in northeastern Ohio, US

State Route 82
- Route of SR 82 highlighted in red

Route information
- Maintained by ODOT
- Length: 88.57 mi (142.54 km)
- Existed: 1924–present

Major junctions
- West end: SR 57 near Elyria
- US 42 in Strongsville; I-71 in Strongsville; I-77 in Broadview Heights; I-271 in Macedonia; I-480 in Twinsburg; US 422 near Warren; SR 11 near Niles; SR 7 near Masury
- East end: US 62 / CR 331 in Masury

Location
- Country: United States
- State: Ohio
- Counties: Lorain, Cuyahoga, Summit, Portage, Trumbull

Highway system
- Ohio State Highway System; Interstate; US; State; Scenic
← SR 81	→ SR 83

State Route 82 (SR 82) is a state route in northeastern Ohio, with a western terminus at State Route 57 in Lorain County, southeast of Elyria.

== Route description ==
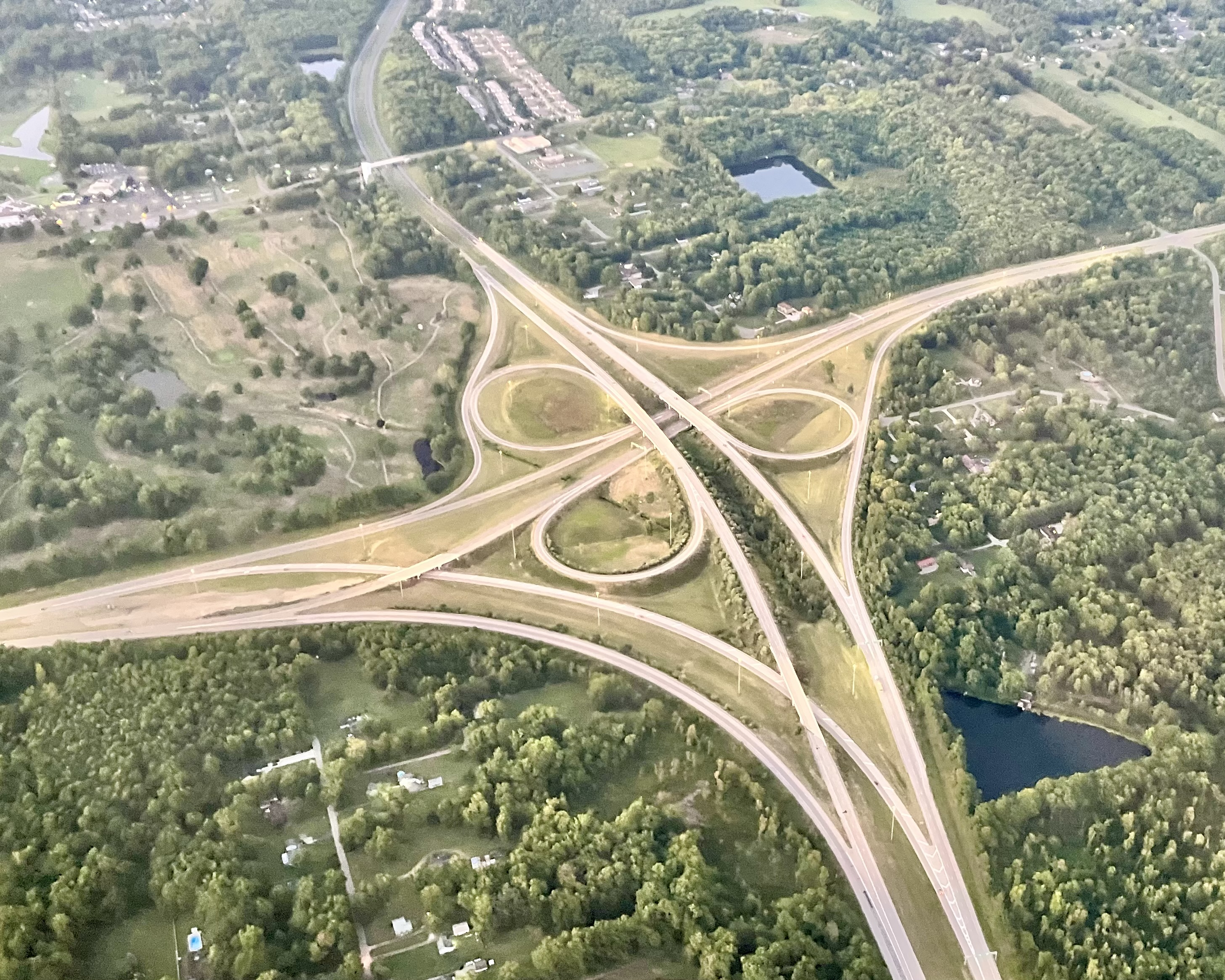
Aerial photograph of SR 11 (top to bottom) and SR 82 (left to right) interchange

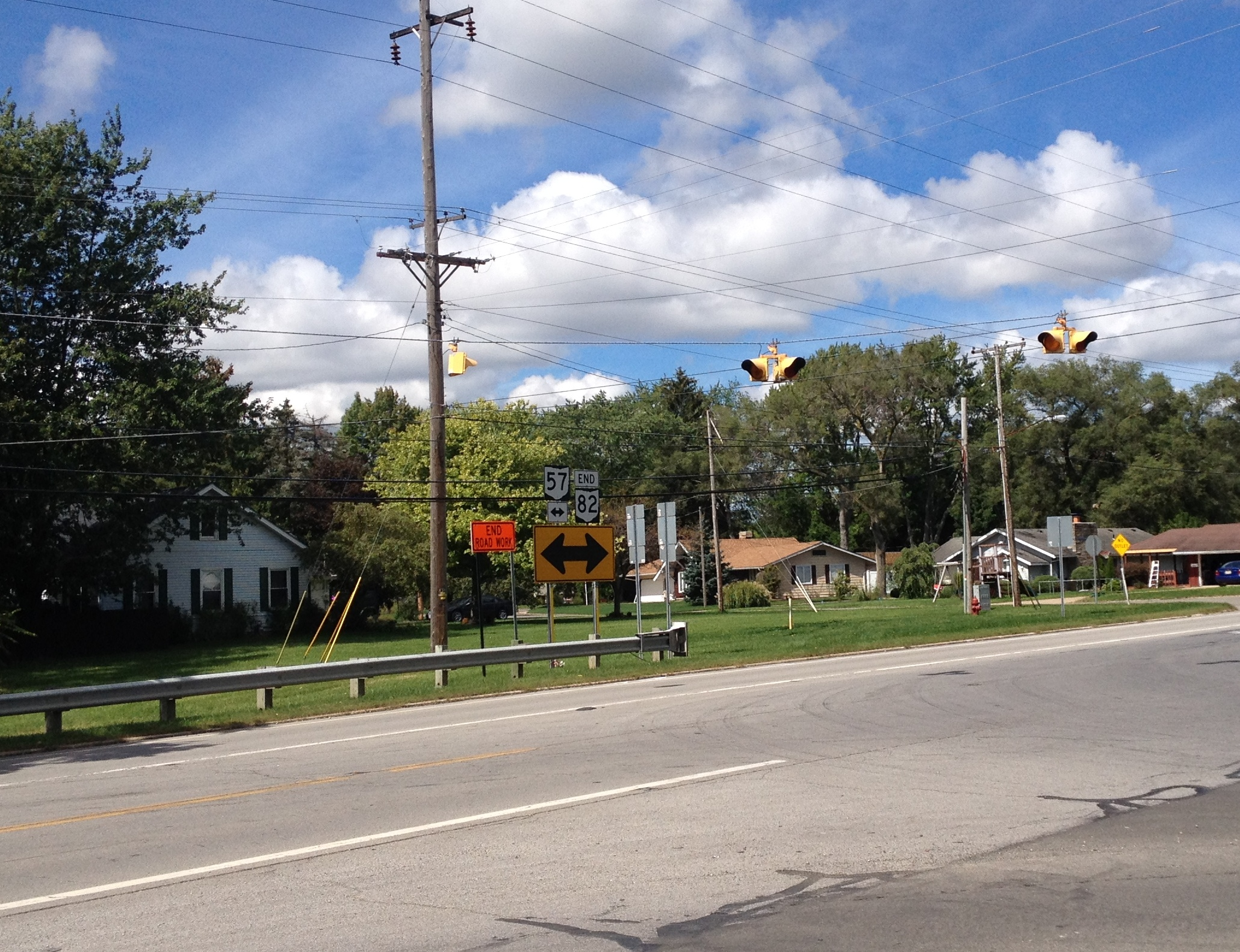
SR 82's western terminus at SR 57.

The route travels predominantly eastward through the southern suburbs of Cleveland as it traverses part of Lorain County, the southern tier of Cuyahoga County, the northern tier of Summit County, and enters Portage County. This segment of State Route 82 is very heavily traveled, and intersects with four interstate highways. Six-ramp interchanges join the route with Interstate 71 and Interstate 77, a partial interchange joins 82 with Interstate 271, and a diamond interchange intersects with Interstate 480/State Route 14. The route also passes through the Cuyahoga Valley National Park in Brecksville, where it crosses the Cuyahoga River on the Brecksville-Northfield High Level Bridge.

After passing through the northern tier of Portage County, State Route 82 crosses central Trumbull County, becoming a freeway for ten miles (16 km) along with State Route 5 as it bypasses the city of Warren. East of Warren, the route continues as a 4-lane divided highway, with level intersections at most secondary roads and interchanges with most other state highways, including a modified cloverleaf interchange with State Route 11. Just before the Pennsylvania state line, State Route 82 meets its eastern terminus with a full cloverleaf interchange in Masury at U.S. Route 62 and Trumbull CR 331 (Hubbard-Masury Road), which continues south.

== History ==
The former alignment of State Route 82 in Trumbull followed Market Street through Warren (concurrent with State Route 5 to Elm Road), and then continued east on what is now Warren-Sharon Road through Howland, Vienna, and Brookfield Center. The former eastern terminus of the route was where Warren-Sharon Road meets the Pennsylvania state line, and State Street in Sharon, Pennsylvania continues east.

In 2012, three men were sentenced to prison for a plot to blow up the Route 82 bridge in Cuyahoga Valley National Park.

== Major intersections ==
County	Location	mi	km	Destinations	Notes
Lorain	Carlisle Township	0.00	0.00	SR 57 (Grafton Road) – Grafton, Elyria	
Lorain	Eaton Township	2.57	4.14	SR 83 (Avon-Belden Road) – Belden, North Ridgeville	
Lorain	Columbia Township	8.08	13.00	SR 252 (East River Road) – Mallet Creek	
Cuyahoga	Strongsville	11.09	17.85	SR 237 north (Prospect Road)	Southern terminus of SR 237
Cuyahoga	Strongsville	12.28	19.76	US 42 (Pearl Road)	
Cuyahoga	Strongsville	13.44– 13.73	21.63– 22.10	I-71 – Columbus, Cleveland	Exit 231 (I-71)
Cuyahoga	North Royalton	17.63	28.37	SR 3 (Ridge Road)	
Cuyahoga	North Royalton	18.16	29.23	SR 94 (State Road)	
Cuyahoga	Broadview Heights	20.23	32.56	SR 176 (Broadview Road)	
Cuyahoga	Broadview Heights	21.98– 22.33	35.37– 35.94	I-77 – Akron, Cleveland	Exit 149 (I-77)
Cuyahoga	Brecksville	23.37	37.61	SR 21 (Brecksville Road)	
Summit	Macedonia	29.07	46.78	SR 8 to I-271 south	
Summit	Macedonia	29.55– 29.63	47.56– 47.68	I-271 north to I-90 – Erie, PA	Exit 19 (I-271); northbound I-271 entrance / southbound I-271 exit only
Summit	Twinsburg	32.76– 32.89	52.72– 52.93	I-480 / SR 14 – Youngstown, Cleveland	Exit 36 (I-480)
Summit	Twinsburg	33.41	53.77	SR 91 (Darrow Road) – Solon, Hudson	
Portage	Aurora	38.52	61.99	SR 43 (Aurora Road)	
Portage	Aurora	38.76	62.38	SR 306 (Chillicothe Road) – Mentor, Streetsboro	
Portage	Mantua Township	45.41	73.08	SR 44 (Painesville–Ravenna Road) to Ohio Turnpike / I-80 – Chardon, Mantua	
Portage	Hiram	49.48	79.63	SR 700 north (Garfield Road) / SR 305 east (Wakefield Road) – Burton	Western end of SR 700 concurrency; eastern terminus of SR 305
Portage	Hiram Township	50.20	80.79	SR 700 south (Garfield Road)	Eastern end of SR 700 concurrency
Portage	Garrettsville	52.83	85.02	SR 88 (North Street / South Street)	
Trumbull	Braceville Township	60.11	96.74	SR 303 west (Hudson–Braceville Road) – Windham	Eastern terminus of SR 303
Trumbull	Braceville Township	60.31	97.06	SR 534 – West Farmington, Newton Falls	
Trumbull	Braceville Township	63.99	102.98	SR 5 west to Ohio Turnpike – Ravenna	Western end of SR 5 concurrency
Trumbull	Warren Township			Western end of freeway	
Trumbull	Warren Township	65.60– 65.74	105.57– 105.80	West Market Street / Homeview Avenue – Warren	
Trumbull	Warren Township	67.00– 67.39	107.83– 108.45	US 422 (Parkman Road) – Cleveland	
Trumbull	Champion Township	69.20– 69.54	111.37– 111.91	SR 45 (Mahoning Avenue) – Ashtabula	
Trumbull	Bazetta Township	71.31– 71.64	114.76– 115.29	Perkins-Jones Road / Larchmont Avenue Extension	
Trumbull	Bazetta Township	72.62– 72.90	116.87– 117.32	SR 5 east (Elm Road) – Cortland	Eastern end of SR 5 concurrency
Trumbull	Howland Township	75.15– 76.14	120.94– 122.54	East Market Street – Warren	
Trumbull	Howland Township	76.68– 76.97	123.40– 123.87	SR 46 (Niles–Cortland Road Southeast) – Cortland, Niles	Diverging diamond interchange – completed in October 2025
Trumbull	Howland Township			Eastern end of freeway	
Trumbull	Vienna Township	78.11– 78.75	125.71– 126.74	SR 11 to I-80 – Youngstown, Ashtabula	Exit 51 (SR 11)
Trumbull	Vienna Township	80.71– 81.00	129.89– 130.36	SR 193 (Youngstown–Kingsville Road Southeast) – Youngstown, Youngstown-Warren Regional Airport	Interchange
Trumbull	Brookfield Township	85.84	138.15	SR 7 (Haddon–Brookfield Road) – Yankee Lake, Conneaut, Hubbard	
Trumbull	Brookfield Township	88.16– 88.57	141.88– 142.54	US 62 / CR 331 (Hubbard-Masury Road) – Hubbard, Sharon, PA	Interchange
1.000 mi = 1.609 km; 1.000 km = 0.621 mi: Concurrency terminus; Incomplete access
