= U.S. Route 42 =

Highway in the United States

U.S. Route 42
- US 42 highlighted in red

Route information
- Length: 349.92 mi (563.14 km)
- Existed: 1926–present

Major junctions
- West end: US 31E / US 60 in Louisville, KY
- I-64 in Louisville, KY; I-71 / I-75 in Florence, KY, Fort Mitchell, KY, Covington, KY, and Cincinnati, OH; I-71 in Cincinnati, OH, Middleburg Heights, OH, and Cleveland, OH; I-70 near London, OH; I-80 in Strongsville, OH; I-90 in Cleveland, OH
- North end: US 6 / US 20 / US 322 / US 422 in Cleveland, OH

Location
- Country: United States
- States: Kentucky, Ohio
- Counties: KY: Jefferson, Oldham, Henry, Trimble, Carroll, Gallatin, Boone, Kenton; OH: Hamilton, Butler, Warren, Greene, Clark, Madison, Union, Delaware, Morrow, Richland, Ashland, Wayne, Medina, Cuyahoga

Highway system
- United States Numbered Highway System; List; Special; Divided
← US 41	US	→ US 43
← US 41A	KY	→ KY 43
← SR 41	OH	→ SR 42

U.S. Route 42 (US 42) is an east–west United States highway that runs southwest–northeast for 350 miles (560 km) from Louisville, Kentucky to Cleveland, Ohio. The route has several names including Pearl Road from Cleveland to Medina in Northeast Ohio, Reading Road in Cincinnati, Cincinnati and Lebanon Pike in southwestern Ohio and Brownsboro Road in Louisville. Traveling northeast, the highway ends in downtown Cleveland and traveling southwest ends in Louisville.

Interstate 71 (I-71) fully supplanted US 42 as an interurban highway in the early 1960s, relegating US 42 to its current role as an ordinary town-to-town surface road. Additionally, I-71 passes through Columbus, whereas US 42 bypasses Columbus. It remains intact as a route; no part of it has ever been diverted to any Interstate highway. It is not the "parent" of any US route with a related number.

In spite of its even number, US 42 is posted north–south in Ohio.

== Route description ==
=== Kentucky ===
U.S. Route 42 starts in Louisville, Kentucky, heading northeast through Prospect on the Oldham County and Jefferson County line. From here US 42 is a two lane road passing through the northern Kentucky hills paralleling between Interstate 71 and the Ohio River. Next, it passes through Goshen near North Oldham High School, situated on the north side. US 42 continues through Oldham County into Trimble County. In Bedford US 42 intersects with US 421 and is concurrent through downtown. The route still heading northeast crosses into Carroll County prior to crossing the Kentucky River and entering Carrollton. US 42 follows northeast along the south bank of the Ohio River passing Markland Lock and Dam and KY 1039 Markland Dam Bridge which connects between Kentucky Speedway and Indiana. Heading east US 42 parallels the Ohio River passing through Warsaw, Gallatin County about 5 miles (8.0 km) prior to intersecting with US 127 starting an extended concurrency. US 127 heads south toward Glencoe, Owenton, and eventually Frankfort.

From the intersection with US 127, US 42 turns away from the Ohio River bank. US 42 enters Boone County about 2.25 miles (3.62 km) prior to intersecting with the western terminus of Kentucky Route 14 (KY 14). Continuing north US 42-127 in about 6 miles (9.7 km) intersects Beaver Road KY 338 creating a wrong-way concurrency between US 127 and KY 338: when going north, drivers are traveling east on US 42, north on US 127, and south on Kentucky 338. This continues for less than a mile until it intersects with Richwood Pike where KY 338 splits off continuing south.

Continuing north for several miles the US 42-127 intersects with KY 536 (Mount Zion Road). Prior to KY 536 Ryle High School sits on the road's west side. Just south of Ryle, US 42 turns from a two-lane country road to a five-lane road. US 42 passes through Union prior to continuing to the northeast with US 127. After a couple of miles, it crosses Interstate 71/Interstate 75. Entering Florence US 42 intersects with KY 842 and KY 237. Within Florence US 25 Dixie Highway joins in a concurrency with US 42-127 which takes on the name Dixie Highway. After crossing briefly into Elsmere, the route enters Erlanger. US 42 becomes almost entirely a commercial road for the duration of its length in Erlanger. Prior to leaving Erlanger, US 42 becomes narrower and more congested after it crosses KY 236.

US 42 is primarily a commercial road prior to crossing under I-275 and proceeds to turn back into an almost purely residential road with a few exceptions while going north. The route intersects with KY 1303 (Turkeyfoot Road) northern terminus. The Crestview Hills town center lies just south of I-275 on the east side of the road, between Dixie Highway and Turkeyfoot Road. Dixie Heights High School is less than a mile down the road on the western side. Two intersections later US 42 is joined with KY 371 for about 500 feet (150 m). After crossing I-71/I-75 again the road heads in a northeast direction closely parallel to I-71/I-75. As it heads north US 42 starts off mostly as a residential road, turning more and more into a commercial road.

As it winds down from the suburbs into Covington the highway's name changes from Dixie Highway to Pike Street prior to crossing I-71/I-75 again. US 25-42-127 turns left on Main St heading north and crossing KY 8. US 42 crosses into Ohio from Covington on the Clay Wade Bailey Bridge, together with US 25 and US 127.

=== Ohio ===
US 42 stretches 241.8 miles (389.1 km) across Ohio. It is classified as 59.3% rural and 40.7% urban, with only 1.1 miles (1.8 km) coded as freeway (while running concurrently with US 23 in Delaware). The route begins in Cincinnati, then passes through Hamilton, Butler, Warren, Greene, Clark, Madison, Union, Delaware, Morrow, Richland, Ashland, Wayne and Medina, Cuyahoga counties prior to reaching its terminus in Cleveland. The route barely enters Butler and Wayne counties with about 3 miles (4.8 km) in each.

US 42 crosses into Cincinnati from Covington, Kentucky, on the Clay Wade Bailey Bridge, concurrent with US 127. US 42 heads northeast out of Cincinnati on Reading Road, which runs between I-71 and I-75. In 2020, the Cincinnati City Council approved a project to rename Reading Road to President Barack Obama Avenue from Downtown Cincinnati to Reading, pending private donations; all 30,000 signs are expected to be installed by September 2021. Reading Road intersects with I-275, then briefly enters Butler County. The Ohio Department of Transportation has given this portion of US 42 the name Columbus–Cincinnati Road, but it is locally known as Cincinnati–Columbus Road, a name that also appears on West Chester Township signs along the road.

The portion of US 42 in Warren County between Lebanon and Waynesville is designated "Sergeant Brian Dulle Memorial Highway", in honor of a Warren County Sheriff's deputy who was struck and killed along US 42 on May 10, 2011, by a stolen car, while he was laying out stop sticks to catch the driver.

The intersection with Spring Valley–Paintersville Road in Spring Valley Township, Greene County near the village of Spring Valley has been the site of numerous fail-to-yield accidents, including a double fatality in 2017. In October 2018, the Ohio Department of Transportation announced that it would convert the intersection into a "basic RCUT", which would add a median and replace all left turns with right-in/right-out turns and median U-turns. The project is expected to cost around $1.2 million and begin in late 2020. The conversion was completed in December 2020.

In Xenia, the designation "Brigadier General Charles Young Memorial Historical Corridor" leaves US 68 and joins US 42 at the routes' junction, in honor of Young, a pioneering figure in US history, and at his death, the highest-ranking Black officer in the Regular Army.

Still in Xenia, the intersection of US 42 (North Columbus Street) and East Church Street, where US 42 formerly continued at an awkward angle, was converted to a roundabout on June 12, 2020, at a cost of approximately $1.1 million.

After leaving Xenia, the route and the memorial historical corridor cross into Wilberforce. There they pass the Charles Young Buffalo Soldiers National Monument, located at Young's former house. The memorial historical corridor ends at Campus Drive, on the campus of Wilberforce University, where Young had been a professor.

After Wilberforce, major cities along the route are London, Delaware, Mansfield, Ashland and Medina prior to reaching the Cleveland metropolitan area. In London US 42 intersects with I-70. Other than a short concurrency at each end, in Delaware are the only other two concurrencies with US routes. Entering Delaware from the south US 42 runs concurrent with US 23 in Delaware until the junction with US 36 which it follows east for about .25 miles (0.40 km) before turning back to the north. The 1.1-mile (1.8 km) concurrence with US 23 is the only stretch of US 42 that is categorized as a freeway in Ohio.

Heading into Cuyahoga County at Strongsville, US 42 intersects I-80, the Ohio Turnpike, and continues through Middleburg Heights, Parma Heights, and Parma heading into Cleveland and is known locally as Pearl Road. US 42 continues north intersecting with I-71 and nearby exits to I-90. The route is part of the Ohio & Erie Canalway Scenic Byway while continuing north on West 25th. At this point on the route the road is a business district surrounded by varying business and residents of the Ohio City neighborhood. Along this stretch of the route, can be found many historic buildings, including the West Side Market. The last stretch of US 42 is a concurrency with US 6, US 20, and Ohio State Route 3 (SR 3) on Superior Avenue.

The eastern/northern end of US 42 is at Public Square in downtown Cleveland. The square also serves as the western terminus of US 322 coming from the east on Superior as well as the western termini of US 422, SR 14, and SR 87 and the northern terminus of SR 8 coming from the south on Ontario.

== Major intersections ==
State	County	Location	mi	km	Destinations	Notes
Kentucky	Jefferson	Louisville	0.000	0.000	US 31E north / US 60 west (East Main Street)	Outbound access only; western terminus of westbound US 42; west end of US 60 overlap
Kentucky	Jefferson	Louisville	0.000	0.000	US 31E / US 60 (Baxter Street)	Inbound access only; western terminus of eastbound US 42; west end of US 60 overlap
Kentucky	Jefferson	Louisville	0.656– 0.667	1.056– 1.073	I-64	I-64 exit 7; to I-64 east and from I-64 west in eastbound US 42 direction, to I-64 west and from I-64 east in westbound US 42 direction
Kentucky	Jefferson	Louisville	0.805	1.296	US 60 east (Frankfort Avenue)	East end of US 60 overlap
Kentucky	Jefferson	Brownsboro Village–Druid Hills line	3.890	6.260	KY 1932 south (Chenoweth Lane) – St. Matthews	Northern terminus of KY 1932
Kentucky	Jefferson	Louisville–Northfield line	5.730– 5.801	9.222– 9.336	I-264 to I-71 – Louisville Zoo	I-264 exit 22; former US 460 Byp.
Kentucky	Jefferson	Northfield	5.920	9.527	KY 22 east (Brownsboro Road) / Northfield Drive	Western terminus of KY 22
Kentucky	Jefferson	Louisville	6.795	10.935	KY 22C east (Seminary Drive)	Western terminus of KY 22C
Kentucky	Jefferson	Prospect	8.960	14.420	I-265 south to I-71 (Gene Snyder Freeway)	I-265 exit 26; southbound I-265 entrance / northbound I-265 exit
Kentucky	Jefferson	Prospect–Louisville line	11.222	18.060	KY 329 east (Covered Bridge Road)	Western terminus of KY 329
Kentucky	Jefferson	Prospect–Louisville line	11.355	18.274	KY 3222 east (Rose Island Road)	Western terminus of KY 3222
Kentucky	Oldham	North Oldham	14.213	22.874	KY 1793 north – Creasey Mahan Nature Preserve	Southern terminus of KY 1793
Kentucky	Oldham		17.869	28.757	KY 1694 south (Gum Street) / Shiloh Lane	Northern terminus of KY 1694
Kentucky	Oldham		21.035	33.853	KY 393 south – Buckner	Northern terminus of KY 393
Kentucky	Oldham		23.906	38.473	KY 524 east (Westport Road) – Westport	Western terminus of KY 524
Kentucky	Oldham	Russell Corner	24.859	40.007	KY 53 south to I-71 – La Grange	Northern terminus of KY 53
Kentucky	Oldham		28.346	45.618	KY 524 west (Covington Ridge Road) – Westport	Eastern terminus of KY 524
Kentucky	Oldham		30.135	48.498	KY 3223 south (Old Sligo Road)	Northern terminus of KY 3223
Kentucky	Oldham		30.513	49.106	KY 1488 south (Organ Creek Road)	Northern terminus of KY 1488
Kentucky	Henry	Sligo	31.613	50.876	KY 153 south (Pendleton Road) to I-71 / South 42 Loop	Northern terminus of KY 153
Kentucky	Henry–Trimble county line		32.316	52.008	KY 157 east – Sulphur	Western terminus of KY 157
Kentucky	Trimble	Abbott	35.643	57.362	KY 2868 west (Morton Ridge Road)	Eastern terminus of KY 2868
Kentucky	Trimble		38.892	62.591	KY 3175 south (Sulphur-Bedford Road)	Northern terminus of KY 3175
Kentucky	Trimble	Bedford	39.893	64.202	KY 754 west (Barebone Road)	Eastern terminus of KY 754
Kentucky	Trimble	Bedford	40.394	65.008	US 421 south to I-71 / Spring Street – Frankfort	West end of US 421 overlap
Kentucky	Trimble	Bedford	40.565	65.283	US 421 north	East end of US 421 overlap
Kentucky	Trimble		43.929	70.697	KY 2871 south (Connector Road)	Northern terminus of KY 2871
Kentucky	Trimble		44.736	71.996	KY 3176 north (Bells Ridge Road)	Southern terminus of KY 3176
Kentucky	Carroll		50.695	81.586	KY 1226 west	Eastern terminus of KY 1226
Kentucky	Carroll		51.355	82.648	KY 36 west – Milton	West end of KY 36 overlap
Kentucky	Carroll	Prestonville	52.401	84.331	KY 55 south to I-71	Northern terminus of KY 55
Kentucky	Carroll	Kentucky River	52.537– 52.779	84.550– 84.940	Carrollton–Prestonville Bridge	
Kentucky	Carroll	Carrollton	53.655	86.349	KY 320 south (11th Street)	Northern terminus of KY 320
Kentucky	Carroll	Carrollton	54.054	86.991	KY 36 east / KY 227 south to I-71 – Worthville, General Butler State Park	East end of KY 36 overlap; northern terminus of KY 227
Kentucky	Carroll	Carrollton	54.261	87.325	KY 2350 south (Martin Road)	Northern terminus of KY 2350
Kentucky	Carroll		59.025	94.992	KY 2949 south (South Fork Road)	Northern terminus of KY 2949
Kentucky	Carroll	Ghent	60.800	97.848	KY 47 south (Main Cross Street)	Northern terminus of KY 47
Kentucky	Gallatin		65.911	106.073	KY 184 south	Northern terminus of KY 184
Kentucky	Gallatin		66.492– 66.499	107.009– 107.020	KY 1039 to I-71 – Markland Dam, Indiana	Interchange
Kentucky	Gallatin	Warsaw	70.168	112.924	KY 35 south to I-71	Northern terminus of KY 35
Kentucky	Gallatin		75.214	121.045	US 127 south	West end of US 127 overlap
Kentucky	Gallatin		76.386	122.931	KY 1992 north (Steeles Bottom Road)	Southern terminus of KY 1992
Kentucky	Gallatin		78.509	126.348	KY 562 west	Eastern terminus of KY 562
Kentucky	Boone		80.651	129.795	KY 2850 south	Northern terminus of KY 2850
Kentucky	Boone	Hume	82.521	132.805	KY 14 east to I-71	Western terminus of KY 14
Kentucky	Boone	Beaverlick	85.431	137.488	KY 338 north / KY 1292 east (Beaver Road) – Big Bone Lick State Park	West end of KY 338 overlap; western terminus of KY 1292
Kentucky	Boone		85.979	138.370	KY 338 south – Richwood	East end of KY 338 overlap
Kentucky	Boone	Union	89.682	144.329	KY 3060 east (Frogtown Road) / Double Eagle Drive	Western terminus of KY 3060
Kentucky	Boone	Union	90.485	145.621	KY 536 (Hathaway Road / Mount Zion Road) – Union Business District	
Kentucky	Boone	Florence	92.814	149.370	KY 237 (Pleasant Valley Road / Gunpowder Road)	
Kentucky	Boone	Florence	93.270	150.104	KY 842 (Weaver Road)	
Kentucky	Boone	Florence	94.322	151.797	I-71 / I-75 – Cincinnati, Lexington, Louisville	I-75 exit 180
Kentucky	Boone	Florence	94.690	152.389	KY 1829 east (Industrial Road)	Western terminus of KY 1829
Kentucky	Boone	Florence	95.593	153.842	US 25 south (Dixie Highway)	West end of US 25 overlap
Kentucky	Boone	Florence	95.994	154.487	KY 1017 north (Turfway Road)	Southern terminus of KY 1017
Kentucky	Kenton	Erlanger	97.495	156.903	KY 236 (Commonwealth Avenue) to I-75 south	
Kentucky	Kenton	Erlanger	98.194	158.028	KY 2373 north (Kenton Lands Road)	Southern terminus of KY 2373
Kentucky	Kenton	Crestview Hills	99.047– 99.082	159.401– 159.457	I-275 to I-71 / I-75 / KY 17 – Airport	I-275 exit 83
Kentucky	Kenton	Lakeside Park	99.625	160.331	KY 1303 south (Turkeyfoot Road) / Hudson Avenue	Northern terminus of KY 1303
Kentucky	Kenton	Lakeside Park	100.002	160.938	KY 371 north (Buttermilk Pike) / Huckleberry Hill Drive	West end of KY 371 overlap
Kentucky	Kenton	Fort Mitchell	100.086	161.073	KY 371 south (Orphanage Road)	East end of KY 371 overlap
Kentucky	Kenton	Fort Mitchell	101.221– 101.350	162.899– 163.107	I-71 / I-75 – Lexington, Louisville, Cincinnati	I-75 exit 188
Kentucky	Kenton	Fort Wright	102.259	164.570	KY 1072 south (Kyles Lane) to I-71 / I-75	West end of KY 1072 overlap
Kentucky	Kenton	Fort Wright	102.414	164.819	KY 1072 north (Sleepy Hollow Road)	East end of KY 1072 overlap
Kentucky	Kenton	Covington	104.127– 104.175	167.576– 167.653	I-71 / I-75	I-75 exit 191
Kentucky	Kenton	Covington	104.787	168.638	5th Street (KY 8 east)	One-way street
Kentucky	Kenton	Covington	104.869	168.770	4th Street (KY 8 west)	One-way street
Ohio River			105.287 0.00	169.443 0.00	Clay Wade Bailey Bridge; Kentucky–Ohio line US 25 end; east end of US 25 overlap	
Ohio	Hamilton	Cincinnati	0.47	0.76	US 27 south / US 52 east (I-71 Alt. north)	South end of US 27/US 52 overlap
Ohio	Hamilton	Cincinnati	0.57	0.92	I-75 north / 4th Street	I-75 northbound entrance only
Ohio	Hamilton	Cincinnati	0.64– 0.73	1.03– 1.17	US 22 / SR 3 begin / US 50 / SR 264 west (Sixth Street Expressway) / I-75 – Dayton	Western terminus of US 22/SR 3 NB; ramps to/from US 50 are eastern terminus of SR 264; south end of US 22/SR 3 overlap; no access to I-75 south; I-75 exit 1C
Ohio	Hamilton	Cincinnati	0.81	1.30	US 27 north / US 52 west / US 127 north (Central Avenue) to I-75	North end of northbound US 27/US 52/US 127 overlap
Ohio	Hamilton	Cincinnati	0.97	1.56	Seventh Street east ( US 22 east / SR 3 north)	One-way street; north end of US 22/SR 3 overlap
Ohio	Hamilton	Cincinnati	1.09	1.75	Ninth Street west ( US 22 west / SR 3 south)	One-way street
Ohio	Hamilton	Cincinnati	1.21	1.95	US 27 north / US 52 west / US 127 north (Central Parkway)	North end of southbound US 27/US 52/US 127 overlap
Ohio	Hamilton	Cincinnati	2.06	3.32	I-471 south / East Liberty Street – Newport KY	I-471 exit 7; I-471 southbound entrance / northbound exit only
Ohio	Hamilton	Cincinnati	2.29– 2.58	3.69– 4.15	I-71 / Eden Park Drive / Florence Avenue – Columbus	I-71 exit 2; northbound US 42 / northbound I-71 entrance and exit and southbound US 42 / southbound I-71 entrance and exit only
Ohio	Hamilton	Cincinnati	5.69	9.16	SR 4 north (Paddock Road) to I-75	Southern terminus of SR 4
Ohio	Hamilton	Cincinnati	6.86– 6.97	11.04– 11.22	SR 562 to I-71 / I-75	SR 562 exit 2
Ohio	Hamilton	Cincinnati	8.24	13.26	SR 561 (East Seymour Avenue) to I-75	
Ohio	Hamilton	Reading	9.90– 10.00	15.93– 16.09	Galbraith Road	To SR 126; direct exit from SR 126 eastbound to US 42
Ohio	Hamilton	Sharonville	16.05– 16.22	25.83– 26.10	I-275 to I-71 / I-75 – Dayton, Columbus	I-275 exit 46
Ohio	Butler	No major junctions				
Ohio	Warren	Mason	24.47	39.38	SR 741 to I-71 / I-75	
Ohio	Warren	Lebanon	30.71	49.42	SR 48 south / SR 63 west / SR 123 south (Main Street)	South end of SR 48/SR 123 overlap
Ohio	Warren	Lebanon	30.86	49.66	SR 123 north (Silver Street)	North end of SR 123 overlap
Ohio	Warren	Lebanon	30.93	49.78	SR 48 north (Broadway)	North end of SR 48 overlap
Ohio	Warren	Lebanon	33.01	53.12	To SR 48 south / I-71 (via SR 48T) / Miller Road	Northern terminus of unsigned SR 48T
Ohio	Warren	Waynesville	39.97	64.33	SR 73 – Franklin, Wilmington, Caesar Creek	
Ohio	Greene		47.31	76.14	SR 725 west – Spring Valley, Bellbrook, Centerville	Eastern terminus of SR 725
Ohio	Greene		52.42– 53.14	84.36– 85.52	US 35 – Dayton, Washington CH	Interchange
Ohio	Greene	Xenia	54.49	87.69	US 35 Bus. west (Main Street)	South end of US 35 Bus. overlap
Ohio	Greene	Xenia	54.79	88.18	US 68 / SR 380 south (Detroit Street)	Northern terminus of SR 380
Ohio	Greene	Xenia	55.12	88.71	US 35 Bus. east (Main Street)	North end of US 35 Bus. overlap
Ohio	Greene	Cedarville	62.74	100.97	SR 72 south (Main Street) / Xenia Avenue	South end of SR 72 overlap
Ohio	Greene	Cedarville	62.88	101.20	SR 72 north (North Main Street) / Chillicothe Street	North end of SR 72 overlap
Ohio	Clark	South Charleston	73.98	119.06	SR 41 (Chillicothe Street)	
Ohio	Madison	London	84.79	136.46	SR 38 south / SR 56 / SR 665 east (Main Street) / SR 142 begins	South end of SR 38/SR 142 overlap; western termini of SR 142 and SR 665
Ohio	Madison	London	84.98	136.76	SR 142 east (East High Street)	North end of SR 142 overlap
Ohio	Madison	London	85.20	137.12	SR 38 north (Elm Street)	North end of SR 38 overlap
Ohio	Madison	Lafayette	89.25– 89.47	143.63– 143.99	US 40 – Springfield, Columbus	Interchange
Ohio	Madison		90.90– 91.22	146.29– 146.80	I-70 – Dayton, Columbus	I-70 exit 79
Ohio	Madison		92.09	148.20	SR 29 – Mechanicsburg, West Jefferson	
Ohio	Union	Plain City	103.35	166.33	SR 161 (West Main Street)	
Ohio	Union		104.37	167.97	SR 736 north / Lambka Road – Marysville	Southern terminus of SR 736
Ohio	Union	New California	107.76– 107.93	173.42– 173.70	US 33 – Marysville, Columbus	Interchange
Ohio	Delaware		114.69	184.58	SR 257 north / SR 745 south – Shawnee Hills	South end of SR 257 overlap; northern terminus of SR 745
Ohio	Delaware		115.26	185.49	SR 257 south / Klondike Road	North end of SR 257 overlap
Ohio	Delaware	Delaware	120.34	193.67	South Sandusky Street	Interchange
Ohio	Delaware	Delaware	120.42	193.80	US 23 south	South end of US 23 overlap
Ohio	Delaware	Delaware	121.50– 121.71	195.54– 195.87	US 23 north / US 36 west / SR 521 west (William Street) to SR 37 west – Toledo, Marion	Interchange; north end of US 23 overlap; south end of US 36/SR 521 overlap
Ohio	Delaware	Delaware	121.91	196.20	US 36 east / SR 521 east (East William Street)	North end of US 36/SR 521 overlap
Ohio	Delaware	Delaware	122.09	196.48	SR 37 (East Central Avenue) to US 23 north	
Ohio	Delaware	Ashley	131.79	212.10	SR 229 – Norton, Marengo	
Ohio	Morrow		134.89	217.08	SR 746 north / CR 155 east – Caledonia	Southern terminus of SR 746
Ohio	Morrow	Cardington	139.71	224.84	SR 529 (Marion Street)	
Ohio	Morrow	Mount Gilead	145.01	233.37	SR 61 south to I-71	South end of SR 61 overlap
Ohio	Morrow	Mount Gilead	145.61	234.34	SR 95 (Marion Street) to I-71 – Mt. Gilead State Park	Unsigned SR 95A
Ohio	Morrow	Mount Gilead	145.73	234.53	SR 95 (High Street)	
Ohio	Morrow	Mount Gilead	145.96	234.90	SR 61 north (North Main Street) / West Union Street	North end of SR 61 overlap
Ohio	Morrow	Williamsport	151.75	244.22	SR 19 north / CR 22 east – Galion	Southern terminus of SR 19
Ohio	Morrow	Johnsville	156.42	251.73	SR 314 – Shelby, Chesterville	
Ohio	Richland	Lexington	162.14	260.94	SR 97 west (West Main Street)	South end of SR 97 overlap
Ohio	Richland	Lexington	162.22	261.07	SR 546 south (Frederick Street) / Plymouth Street	Northern terminus of SR 546
Ohio	Richland	Lexington	162.96	262.26	SR 97 east to I-71 – Bellville	North end of SR 97 overlap
Ohio	Richland	Mansfield	168.73	271.54	SR 13 south (South Main Street) to I-71	South end of SR 13 overlap
Ohio	Richland	Mansfield	169.05	272.06	SR 13 north (South Diamond Street) – Mansfield Lahm Airport	North end of SR 13 overlap; south end of SR 13 Truck overlap
Ohio	Richland	Mansfield	169.18	272.27	US 42 Truck north / SR 13 Truck north (South Adams Street)	North end of SR 13 Truck overlap
Ohio	Richland	Mansfield	169.45	272.70	SR 430 west / Lincoln Highway west (Park Avenue East)	South end of SR 430 overlap; no left turn northbound
Ohio	Richland	Mansfield	169.73	273.15	SR 430 east / Lincoln Highway east (Park Avenue East)	North end of SR 430 overlap
Ohio	Richland	Mansfield	170.02	273.62	SR 39 / US 42 Truck south / SR 430 Truck (East Fifth Street)	
Ohio	Richland		171.90– 172.26	276.65– 277.23	US 30 to I-71 / Beal Road – Bucyrus, Wooster, Kingwood Center	Interchange
Ohio	Ashland		177.12	285.05	SR 603 – Olivesburg, Mifflin	
Ohio	Ashland		179.58	289.01	Claremont Avenue - Ashland	Interchange; northbound exit and southbound entrance
Ohio	Ashland	Ashland	182.56	293.80	SR 511 to SR 60 – Ashland, Hayesville, Loudonville	Interchange
Ohio	Ashland	Ashland	184.05	296.20	US 250 east to I-71 / SR 96 (East Main Street) – Wooster, Ashland	South end of US 250 overlap; eastern terminus of SR 96
Ohio	Ashland	Ashland	185.04	297.79	US 250 west – Norwalk	North end of US 250 overlap
Ohio	Ashland		189.48	304.94	SR 89 – Polk, Jeromesville	
Ohio	Ashland		190.88	307.19	SR 302 – Savannah, Wooster	
Ohio	Ashland		190.98	307.35	SR 604 east	Western terminus of SR 604
Ohio	Wayne	West Salem	196.85	316.80	SR 301 (Main Street) to I-71 north – Homerville, Lattasburg	
Ohio	Medina		201.75– 201.94	324.69– 324.99	US 224 west / SR 421 east – Findlay, Lodi	Interchange; south end of US 224 overlap; eastern terminus of SR 421
Ohio	Medina		205.61– 206.05	330.90– 331.61	US 224 east / SR 421 west to I-71 – Akron, Lodi	Interchange; north end of US 224 overlap; western terminus of SR 421
Ohio	Medina	Lafayette Township	210.83	339.30	SR 162 east (Wedgewood Road) – Akron	South end of SR 162 overlap
Ohio	Medina		211.30	340.05	SR 162 west (Chatham Road) – Spencer	North end of SR 162 overlap
Ohio	Medina	Medina	215.57	346.93	SR 3 south (South Court Street)	South end of SR 3 overlap
Ohio	Medina	Medina	215.83	347.34	SR 3 north / SR 18 east / SR 57 south (East Washington Street)	North end of SR 3 overlap
Ohio	Medina	Medina	215.91	347.47	SR 18 west / SR 57 north (West Liberty Street)	
Ohio	Medina	Brunswick	223.07	359.00	SR 303 (Center Road) – LaGrange, Hinckley	
Ohio	Cuyahoga	Strongsville	228.40	367.57	SR 82 (Royalton Road)	
Ohio	Cuyahoga	Strongsville	230.25	370.55	I-80 / Ohio Turnpike	Ohio Turnpike exit 161
Ohio	Cuyahoga	Middleburg Heights	231.44– 231.65	372.47– 372.80	I-71 to Ohio Turnpike – Cleveland, Columbus	I-71 exit 234
Ohio	Cuyahoga	Parma	237.56	382.32	SR 3 south (Ridge Road) to I-480	South terminus of SR 3 concurrency
Ohio	Cuyahoga	Parma–Cleveland line	238.06	383.12	SR 17 (Brookpark Road)	
Ohio	Cuyahoga	Cleveland	239.85	386.00	SR 94 south (State Road) to I-480	Northern terminus of SR 94
Ohio	Cuyahoga	Cleveland	241.10– 241.24	388.01– 388.24	I-71 to I-90	I-71 exit 245
Ohio	Cuyahoga	Cleveland	241.14	388.08	Scranton Road – Level I Trauma Center	Interchange; northbound exit only
Ohio	Cuyahoga	Cleveland	242.33– 242.44	389.99– 390.17	I-90 west – Toledo	I-90 exit 170A; eastbound I-90 exit / westbound I-90 entrance only
Ohio	Cuyahoga	Cleveland	243.11	391.25	SR 10 (Lorain Avenue)	
Ohio	Cuyahoga	Cleveland	243.66	392.13	US 6 west / US 20 west / US 6 Alt. west (Detroit Avenue)	Southern terminus of US 6 / US 20 concurrency; eastern terminus of US 6 Alt.
Ohio	Cuyahoga	Cleveland	243.73– 244.26	392.25– 393.10	Detroit–Superior Bridge over Cuyahoga River	
Ohio	Cuyahoga	Cleveland	244.53– 244.63	393.53– 393.69	US 6 east / US 322 east (Superior Avenue) / US 422 east / SR 8 south / SR 14 east / SR 43 south / SR 87 east (Ontario Street) / US 20 east (Euclid Avenue)	Public Square; northern terminus of US 6 / US 20 / US 42 concurrency; termini of US 322, US 422, SR 3, SR 8, SR 14 SR 43, SR 87
1.000 mi = 1.609 km; 1.000 km = 0.621 mi: Concurrency terminus; Incomplete access; Tolled

== See also ==
- List of United States Numbered Highways
- Roads in Louisville, Kentucky
