= Ohio State Route 303 =

State highway in Ohio, US

State Route 303

Route information
- Maintained by ODOT
- Length: 75.71 mi (121.84 km)
- Existed: 1932–present

Major junctions
- West end: US 20 in Wakeman
- US 42 in Brunswick; I-71 in Brunswick; I-271 near Richfield; SR 8 near Hudson; SR 14 / SR 43 in Streetsboro; SR 44 in Shalersville
- East end: SR 82 near Windham

Location
- Country: United States
- State: Ohio
- Counties: Huron, Lorain, Medina, Summit, Portage, Trumbull

Highway system
- Ohio State Highway System; Interstate; US; State; Scenic
← SR 302	→ SR 304

State Route 303 (SR 303) is a 75.71-mile-long (121.84 km) Ohio State Route that runs between Wakeman and Windham in the US state of Ohio. The highway is not listed on the National Highway System. Most of the route is a rural two-lane highway and passes through farmland, woodland, and residential properties. The route passes through the Cuyahoga Valley National Park. For some of its path, SR 303 runs generally parallel to the south of the Ohio Turnpike. SR 303 was first signed in 1932 on a section of the same alignment as today. The highway was extended towards the west in 1935. The highway was extended again in 1937. The eastern terminus was rerouted to its current intersection in the mid-1950s.

== Route description ==
SR 303 begins at an intersection with US 20 in Wakeman. The route heads east passing through farmland and residential properties, on the south edge of Wakeman. The highway has an intersection with SR 60, before leaving Wakeman. After Wakeman the highway curves southeast passing through woodland and farmland, crossing over the Vermillion River. The road curves towards the east passing through farmland, before entering LaGrange. In LaGrange the route passes through residential properties, having a roundabout with SR 301. After the roundabout SR 303 has an at-grade crossing with railroad tracks. After the tracks the road leaves LaGrange and crosses over the East Branch of the Black River. After crossing over the river the highway passes through farmland, before having a T-intersection with SR 83. The two routes head due north concurrent, passing under railroad tracks. After the railroad tracks the highway turns east leaving SR 83 and becoming concurrent with SR 57. SR 303 and SR 57 head east, as a two-lane highway, passing through woodland and farmland. SR 57 turns due south leaving SR 303.

SR 303 continues east passing through farmland, before entering Valley City. In Valley City the route has an intersection with SR 252. After Valley City, the road enters Brunswick, passing through residential properties, having an intersection with US 42. East of US 42, SR 303 becomes a four-lane highway with a center turn lane, passing through commercial properties. The road becomes a four-lane divided highway, before having an interchange with Interstate 71 (I–71). East of I–71 the route returns to a four-lane highway with a center turn lane, still passing through commercial properties. The road leaves Brunswick, becoming a two-lane highway, passing through woodland, with houses. The road has an intersection with SR 3 in Hinckley; at this intersection SR 94 turns east concurrent with SR 303. SR 94 and SR 303 heads east through rural properties and a T-intersection with the northern terminus of SR 606. After SR 606, SR 94 turns north leaving SR 303, which continues east. The road enters Richfield and has an intersection with SR 176.

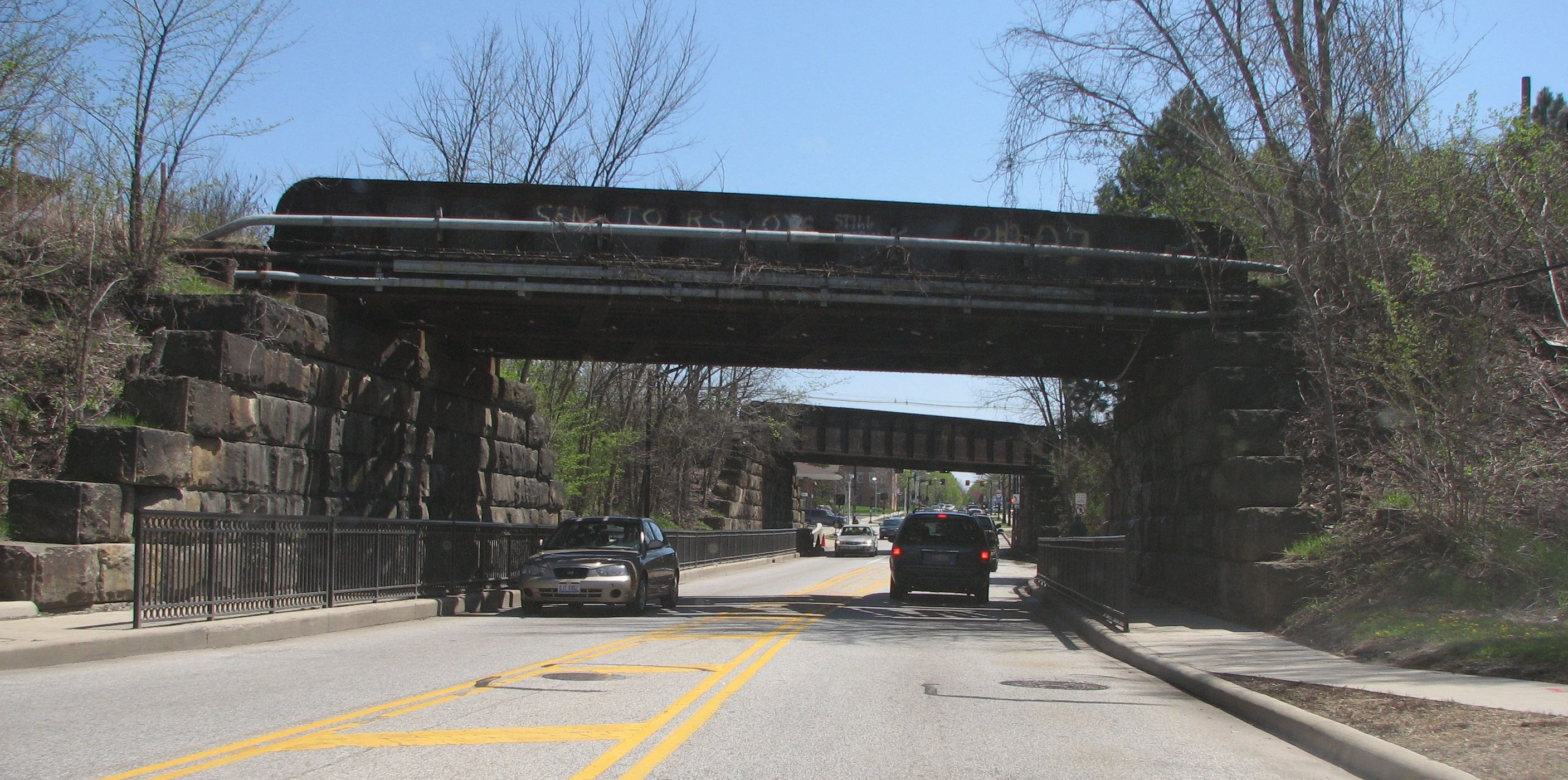
Ohio State Route 303 passes under two railroad bridges in Hudson, Ohio.

SR 303 passes through residential and commercial properties in Richfield, before passes under I–77. After I–77, the road passes through woodland, with some houses, before becoming a four-lane undivided highway. The highway has an interchange with I–271, before narrowing back to a two-lane highway. After I–271 the road roughly parallels the Ohio Turnpike to the south, passing through the Cuyahoga Valley National Park. The highway leaves the national park and has an interchange with SR 8. After the interchange with SR 8, SR 303 enters Hudson, passing through residential and commercial properties. In downtown Hudson the route passes under two railroad tracks, before having an intersection with SR 91. The route leaves Hudson and enters Streetsboro, passing through residential and commercial properties. In Streetsboro SR 303 begins a concurrency with SR 14. The concurrency heads east having an intersection with SR 43. After the intersection with SR 43, the concurrency ends with SR 14 heading southeast and SR 303 heading east.

SR 303 passes through commercial and residential properties, before leaving Streetsboro. After Streetsboro, the highway passes through farmland and woodland, with house, as a two-lane highway. The route crosses over the Cuyahoga River, before an intersection with SR 44 at the center of Shalersville. Continuing east, the road passes through a short concurrency with SR 88 in Freedom Township between Freedom Center and Drakesburg. After the concurrency with SR 88, SR 303 enters Windham Township and the village of Windham. In Windham the route passes through residential properties, before leaving the village. East of Windham the road passes through woodland, with houses, before crossing the Ohio Turnpike. After crossing the turnpike, the eastern terminus of SR 303 is at a T-intersection with SR 82 in Braceville Township, just northwest of SR 534. No section of the highway is incorporated within the National Highway System.

== History ==
SR 303 was commissioned in 1932 on the same route as today between Boston Heights and Streetsboro. In 1935 the route was extended west to an intersection with SR 176 in Richfield. The highway was extended west to Wakeman, in 1937, replacing SR 200 between Lagrange and Belden. That same year the route was also extended east to SR 534. Between 1953 and 1955, the eastern terminus was moved to an intersection with SR 82.

== Major intersections ==
County	Location	mi	km	Destinations	Notes
Huron	Wakeman	0.00	0.00	US 20	Western terminus of SR 303
Huron	Wakeman	0.68	1.09	SR 60	
Lorain	Camden Township	5.68	9.14	SR 511	
Lorain	Pittsfield Township	10.16	16.35	SR 58	
Lorain	LaGrange	15.32	24.66	SR 301	
Lorain	Grafton Township	20.39	32.81	SR 83 south	Southern end of SR 83 concurrency
Lorain	Grafton Township	20.45	32.91	SR 83 north / SR 57 north	Northern end of SR 83 concurrency; western end of SR 57 concurrency
Lorain	Grafton Township	22.52	36.24	SR 57 south	Eastern end of SR 57 concurrency
Medina	Liverpool Township	25.68	41.33	SR 252	
Medina	Brunswick	29.92	48.15	US 42	
Medina	Brunswick	32.17	51.77	I-71 – Cleveland, Columbus	Exit 226 on I-71.
Medina	Hinckley Township	34.95	56.25	SR 3 / SR 94 south	Western end of SR 94 concurrency
Medina	Hinckley Township	35.82	57.65	SR 606 south	Northern terminus of SR 606
Medina	Hinckley Township	35.94	57.84	SR 94 north	Eastern end of SR 94 concurrency
Summit	Richfield	39.69	63.87	SR 176	
Summit	Richfield Township	43.14	69.43	I-271 – Medina, Willoughby	Exit 12 on I-271.
Summit	Boston Heights	48.57	78.17	SR 8	
Summit	Hudson	51.28	82.53	SR 91	
Portage	Streetsboro	56.04	90.19	SR 14 east	Western end of SR 14 concurrency
Portage	Streetsboro	56.24	90.51	SR 43	
Portage	Streetsboro	56.51	90.94	SR 14 east	Eastern end of SR 14 concurrency
Portage	Shalersville Township	62.52	100.62	SR 44	
Portage	Freedom Township	66.84	107.57	SR 700	
Portage	Freedom Township	67.01	107.84	SR 88 west	Western end of SR 88 concurrency
Portage	Freedom Township	67.54	108.70	SR 88 east	Eastern end of SR 88 concurrency
Trumbull	Braceville Township	75.71	121.84	SR 82	Eastern terminus of SR 303
1.000 mi = 1.609 km; 1.000 km = 0.621 mi: Concurrency terminus
