= Ohio State Route 83 =

North-south state highway in Ohio, US

State Route 83

Route information
- Maintained by ODOT
- Length: 157.59 mi (253.62 km)
- Existed: 1972–present

Major junctions
- South end: SR 60 near Beverly
- I-70 near New Concord; US 22 / US 40 in New Concord; US 36 / SR 16 in Coshocton; US 62 near Millersburg; US 250 in Wooster; US 30 in Wooster; I-71 near Lodi; US 42 / US 224 near Lodi; US 20 / SR 113 in North Ridgeville; I-90 / SR 2 in Avon
- North end: US 6 in Avon Lake

Location
- Country: United States
- State: Ohio
- Counties: Washington, Morgan, Noble, Guernsey, Muskingum, Coshocton, Holmes, Wayne, Medina, Lorain

Highway system
- Ohio State Highway System; Interstate; US; State; Scenic
← SR 82	→ SR 84
← I-76	SR 76	→ I-77

State Route 83 is a north–south state highway in the U.S. state of Ohio. Its southern terminus is near the town of Beverly at State Route 60, and its northern terminus is overlooking Lake Erie at U.S. Route 6 in Avon Lake. A portion of SR 83 is part of the Morgan County Scenic Byway.

== History ==
At the 1923 Ohio state highway renumbering, the State Route 83 designation was applied to a route from the original alignment of State Route 46 in Ashtabula east to the Pennsylvania state line through Plymouth, Sheffield, and Monroe townships. It was rerouted in 1928 through Kingsville along the current State Route 84 alignment and Monroe Center Road through Kelloggsville to State Route 7. SR 83 was rerouted again in 1938, with the portion from Ashtabula to Kelloggsville following a previously unnumbered road, while the portion from Kelloggsville to SR 7 remained the same. The previous section of SR 83 between Ashtabula and Kelloggsville passing through Kingsville was recertified as SR 84. This alignment lasted until 1958 when the original SR 83 was decertified.

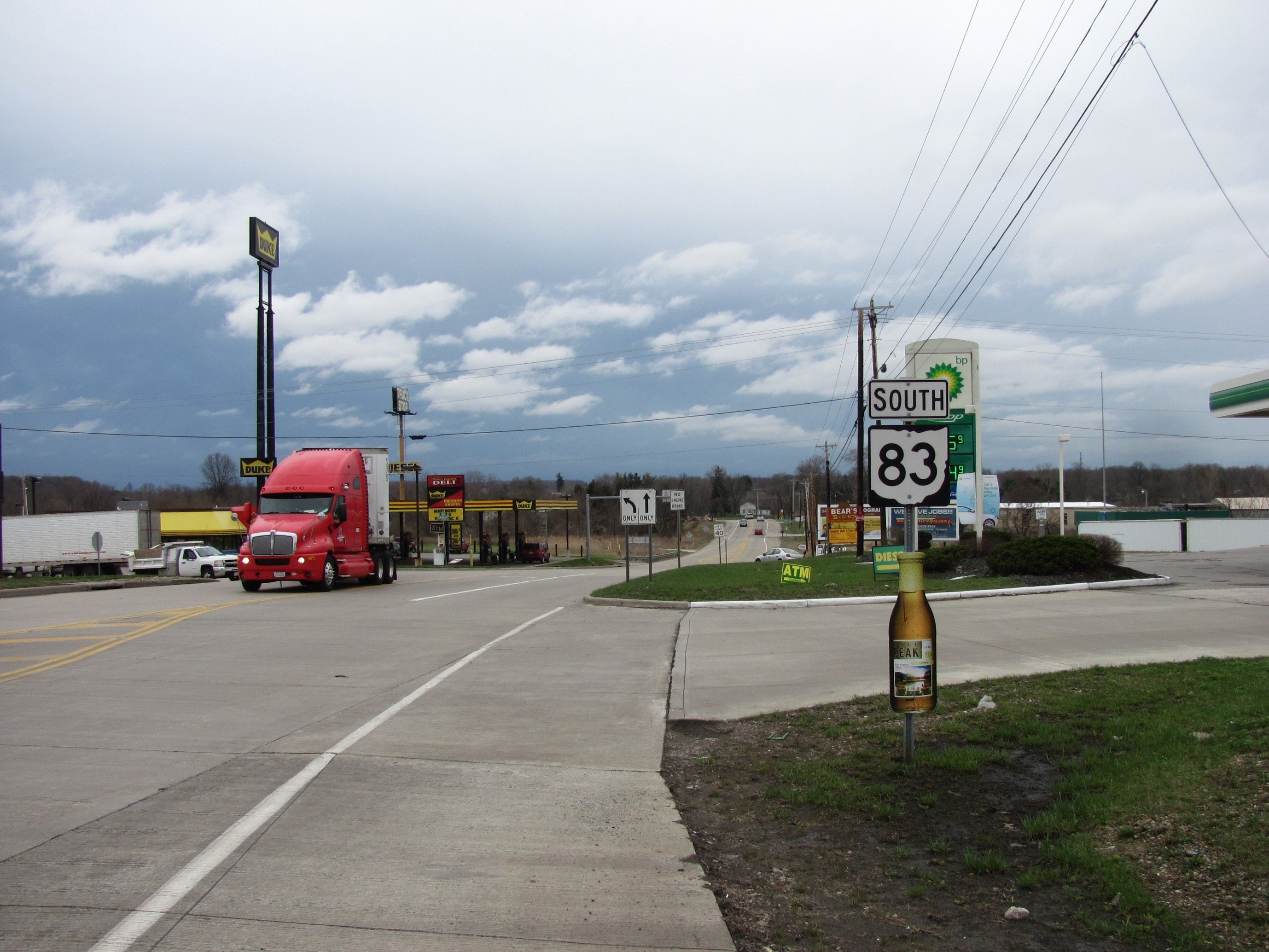
Southbound near Burbank, Ohio

The current SR 83 follows what had previously been State Route 76. SR 76 was established in 1923 between Wooster and New Concord. It followed the current SR 83 route from Wooster to just south of Millersurg, where it then followed the current alignment of US 62 to Killbuck and the current alignment of State Route 60 from Killbuck to Coshocton. From Coshocton to New Concord, it followed the current alignment of SR 83. SR 76 was realigned in 1926, with the portion between Millersburg and Coshocton rerouted to the current alignment of SR 83, and the route was extended south to Cumberland at SR 146. The following year, 1927, it was extended again to the current southern terminus of SR 83, just north of Beverly at what is now SR 60.

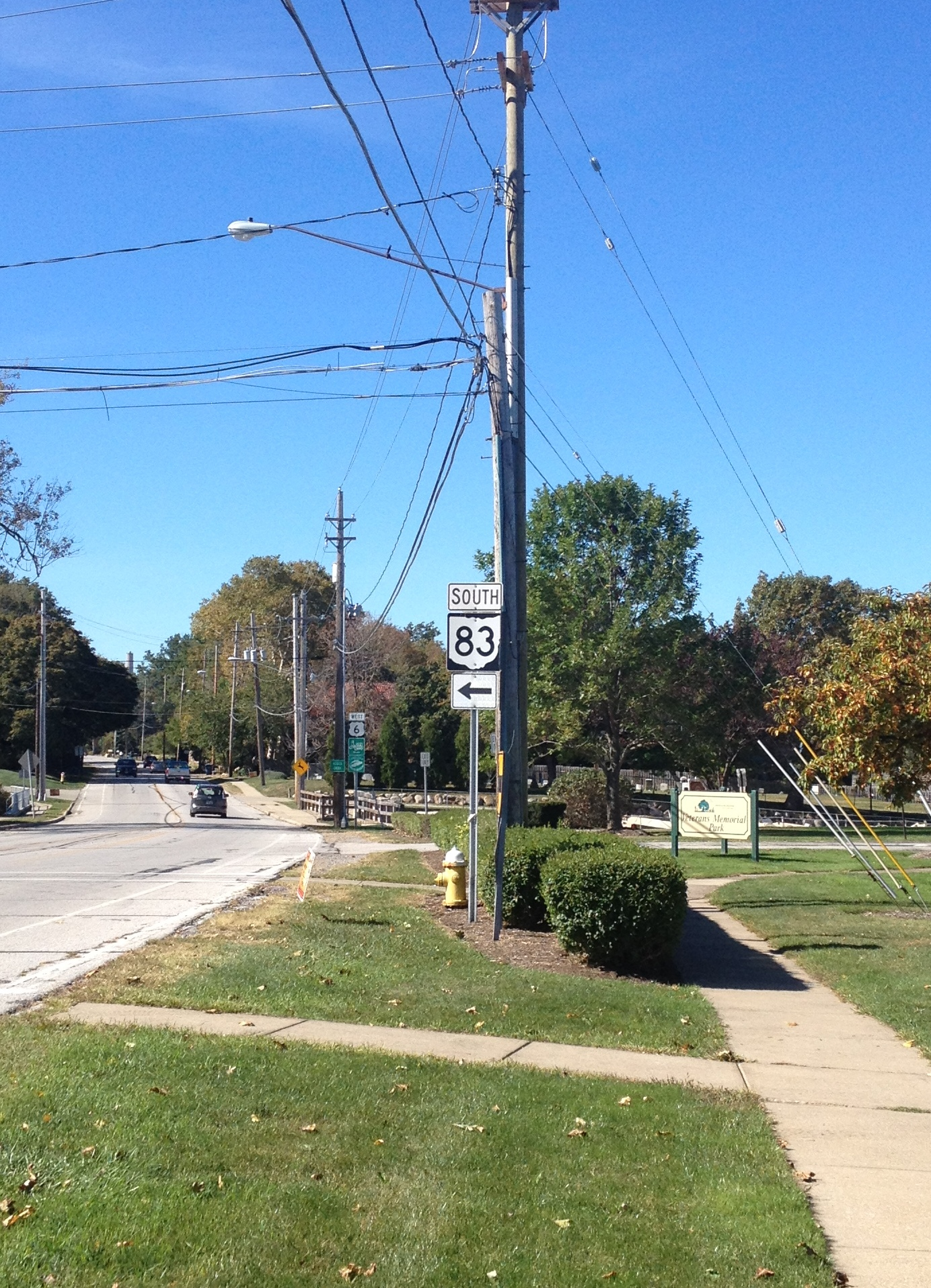
The northern end at US 6 in Avon Lake.

SR 76 was extended to the north in 1937 through Wooster to Avon Lake over the route what is now generally SR 83. It was rerouted around Wooster in 1968 along with US 250 and State Route 3. The current designation of SR 83 came about in 1972 when Interstate 80S was renumbered as Interstate 76 to avoid having two routes with the same number. At this time, SR 83 was also rerouted along a new western bypass of Coshocton with US 36 and State Route 16.

SR 83 was planned to be relocated in Lorain County, but only two short segments of this relocation were built, at Interstate 90/State Route 2 and at State Route 10, with the rest of the plans abandoned after 1991. The latter segment carries part of SR 83C.

== Major Junctions ==
County	Location	mi	km	Destinations	Notes
Washington	Waterford Township	0.00	0.00	SR 60	Southern terminus of SR 83.
Morgan	Manchester Township	9.50	15.29	SR 78	Eastern terminus of SR 78 concurrence.
Morgan	Bristol Township	12.35	19.88	SR 78	Western terminus of SR 78 concurrence.
Morgan	Bristol Township	12.54	20.18	SR 284	
Noble	No major junctions				
Guernsey	Cumberland	25.12	40.43	SR 146; SR 340	Main Street
Guernsey	Westland Township	31.42	50.57	SR 313	Clay Pike Road
Muskingum	New Concord	36.25	58.34	I-70	Junction with I-70 eastbound.
Muskingum	New Concord	36.43	58.63	I-70	Junction with I-70 westbound.
Muskingum	New Concord	37.28	60.00	US 22; US 40	Main Street
Muskingum	Highland Township	41.94	67.50	SR 209	Cambridge Road, Western Terminus of SR 209.
Muskingum	Monroe Township	47.34	76.19	SR 93	Western terminus of SR 93 concurrence (Adamsville-Otsego Road).
Muskingum	Monroe Township	47.65	76.69	SR 93	Eastern terminus of SR 93 concurrence (Plainfield Road).
Coshocton	Jackson Township	59.81	96.25	SR 16	Western terminus of SR 16 concurrence.
Coshocton	Coshocton	62.57	100.70	SR 541	Chestnut Street via interchange.
Coshocton	Coshocton	63.11	101.57	US 36	Western terminus of SR 36 concurrence.
Coshocton	Tuscarawas Township	63.46	102.13	US 36; SR 16	Eastern terminus of US 36 and SR 16 concurrence.
Coshocton	Keene Township	67.26	108.24	SR 643	
Holmes	Mechanic Township	83.63	134.59	US 62	Western terminus of US 62 concurrency.
Holmes	Millersburg	86.55	139.29	SR 39; US 62	Eastern terminus of US 62 concurrency (Jackson Street).
Wayne	Wooster	103.38	166.37	SR 302; US 250	Western terminus of US 250 concurrency (Dover Road).
Wayne	Wooster	105.98	170.56	US 250	Eastern terminus of US 250 concurrency (Dover Road).
Wayne	Wooster	106.20	170.91	US 30	Interchange at Lincoln Way
Wayne	Wooster	106.28	171.04	SR 3	Southern eastern terminus of SR 3 concurrency. SR 3 intersects SR 83 at the SR 83/SR 3/US 30 junction following an on-ramp that hits SR 83 from the east side.
Wayne	Wooster	109.07	175.53	SR 3	Northern eastern terminus of SR 3 concurrency. SR 83 and SR 3 split with SR 3 heading east and intersecting Cleveland Road, while SR 83 continues northbound and passes over SR 3. This is why there are two eastern termini of SR 3 while it is concurrent with SR 83.
Wayne	Congress Township	117.57	189.21	SR 604	Easton Road
Medina	Harrisville Township	121.19	195.04	I-71	I-71 Exit 204
Medina	Lodi	124.14	199.78	SR 421	Bank Street to west, Medina Street to east
Medina	Harrisville Township	124.94	201.07	US 42; US 224	Junction with US 42 northbound and US 224 eastbound (Lafayette Road).
Medina	Harrisville Township	124.99	201.15	US 42; US 224	Junction with US 42 southbound and US 224 westbound (Lafayette Road).
Medina	Chatham Township	128.77	207.24	SR 162	Chatham Road
Medina	Litchfield	133.45	214.77	SR 18	Southern eastern terminus with SR 18. Southern end of Litchfield traffic circle heading westbound (counterclockwise). Southern terminus with SR 83D (Norwalk Road).
Medina	Litchfield	133.53	214.90	SR 18	Southern eastern terminus with SR 18. Northern end of Litchfield traffic circle heading westbound (counterclockwise). Northern terminus with SR 83D (Norwalk Road).
Lorain	Grafton Township	138.28	222.54	SR 303	Western terminus of SR 303 (Lagrange-Richfield Road).
Lorain	Grafton Township	138.34	222.64	SR 303; SR 57	Eastern terminus of SR 303 and SR 57 (Medina-Elyria Road).
Lorain	Grafton Township	139.90	225.15	SR 57	Western terminus of SR 57 (Grafton Road).
Lorain	Eaton Township	143.65	231.18	SR 82	Royalton Road
Lorain	North Ridgeville	146.34	235.51	SR 83C to SR 10 / I-480 / I-80 / Ohio Turnpike	Lorain Road; eastern terminus of SR 83C
Lorain	North Ridgeville	148.97	239.74	US 20; SR 113	Center Ridge Road
Lorain	Avon	153.77	247.47	SR 254	Detroit Road
Lorain	Avon	154.09	247.98	I-90; SR 2	I-90/OH-2 Exit 153
Lorain	Avon Lake	157.59	253.62	US 6 / LECT	Northern terminus of SR 83 at Lake Road.
1.000 mi = 1.609 km; 1.000 km = 0.621 mi: Concurrency terminus

== Route 83C ==
Route 83C is an unsigned, ¾-mile route connecting SR 83 with SR 10 in North Ridgeville and Eaton Township. SR 83C runs southwest from SR 83 along Lorain Road and Butternut Ridge Road, then turns northwest, intersecting SR 10 then ending just beyond at Chestnut Ridge Road. The latter road is one of the two constructed segments of the once-proposed relocation of SR 83. The route is marked "To SR 10/I-480/I-80" westbound and "To SR 83" eastbound. (SR 83 as it has remained has not received direct access to SR 10.)
