= Homerville, Ohio =

- Unincorporated community
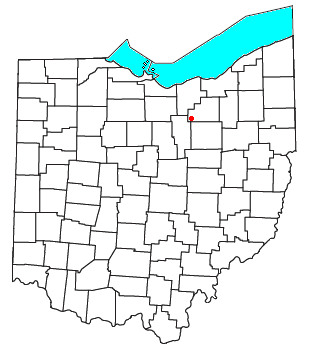
- Location of Homerville, Ohio
- Coordinates: 41°01′42″N 82°07′30″W
- Country: United States
- State: Ohio
- County: Medina
- Township: Homer
- Elevation: 1,073 ft (327 m)
- Time zone: UTC-5 (Eastern (EST))
  - Summer (DST): UTC-4 (EDT)
- ZIP codes: 44235
- GNIS feature ID: 1064855

Homerville is an unincorporated community in central Homer Township, Medina County, Ohio, United States. It has a post office with the ZIP code 44235. It lies at the intersection of U.S. Route 224 with State Route 301.

Homerville is situated in the rural quad-county area where Ashland, Lorain, Medina, and Wayne Counties meet. The economy is based largely upon agriculture, including livestock raising, dairy farming, and crop farming. Children in the Homerville area attend the schools of Black River School District.

A post office called Homerville has been in operation since 1844. The community's name commemorates Homer, the Ancient Greek poet.
