= Lattasburg, Ohio =

- Unincorporated community
- Location within Ohio Location within the United States
- Coordinates: 40°52′43″N 82°06′31″W
- Country: United States
- State: Ohio
- County: Wayne
- Elevation: 1,155 ft (352 m)
- Time zone: UTC-5 (Eastern (EST))
  - Summer (DST): UTC-4 (EDT)
- Area code: 330
- GNIS feature ID: 1064972

Lattasburg is an unincorporated community in Wayne County, Ohio, United States. Lattasburg is located at the junction of Ohio State Route 301 and Ohio State Route 302 6.4 miles (10.3 km) south of West Salem.

== History ==
Lattasburg was originally called West Union, and under the latter name was platted in 1851. The present name honors Ephraim Latta, an early settler. A post office called Lattasburgh was established in 1867, the spelling was changed to Lattasburg in 1893, and the post office closed in 1905.
