= Congress, Ohio =

- Village
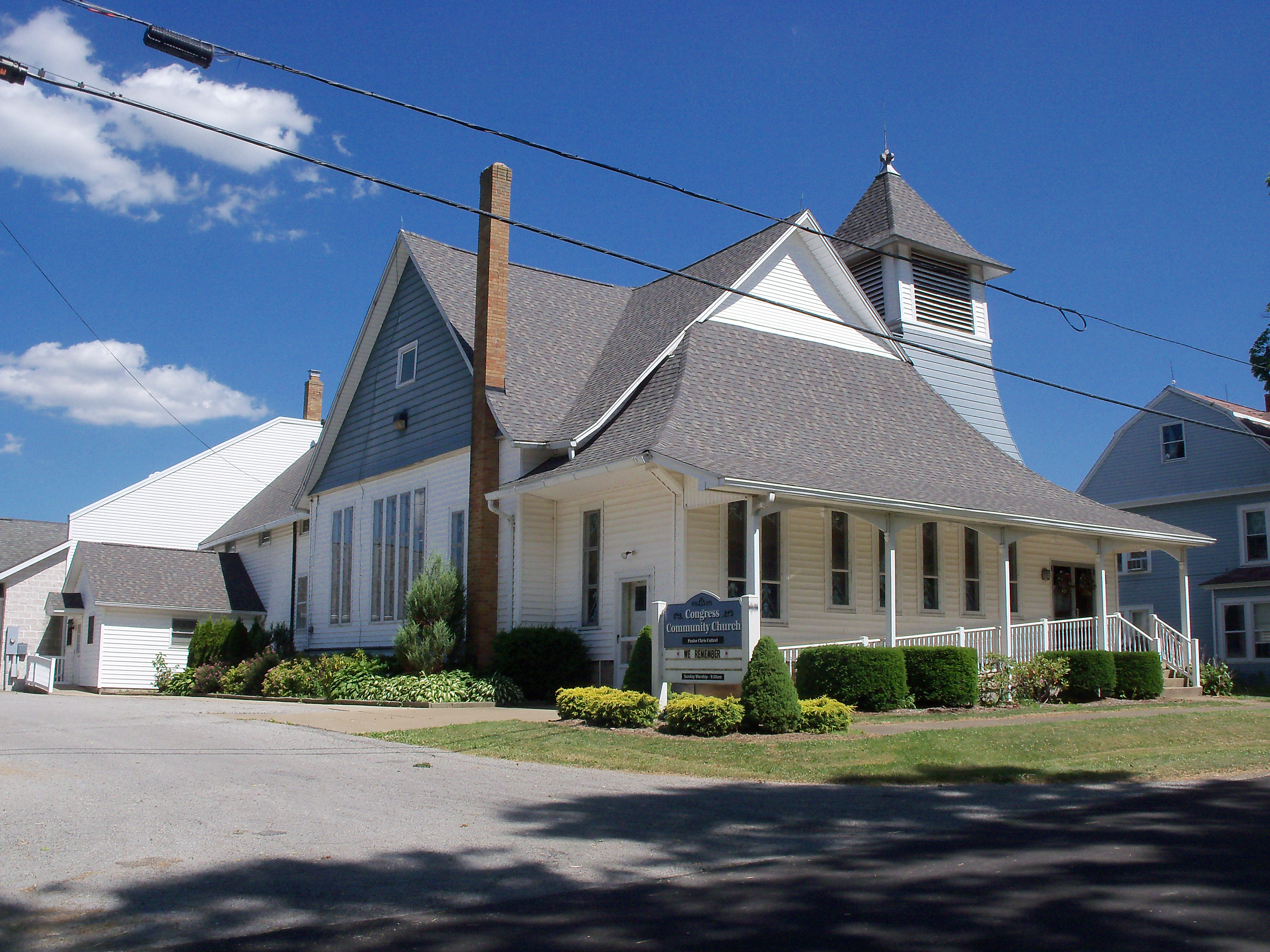
- Presbyterian Church in Congress

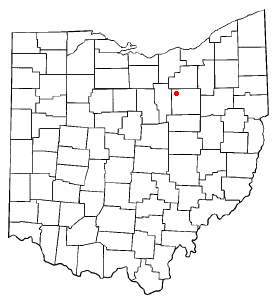
- Location of Congress, Ohio

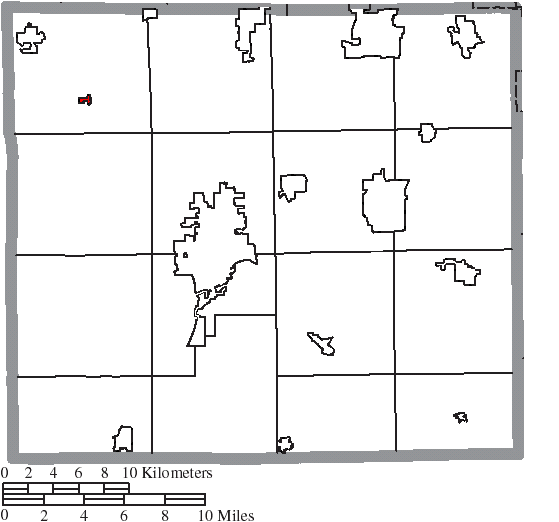
- Location of Congress in Wayne County
- Coordinates: 40°55′31″N 82°03′21″W
- Country: United States
- State: Ohio
- County: Wayne

Area
  - Total: 0.16 sq mi (0.41 km^{2})
  - Land: 0.16 sq mi (0.41 km^{2})
  - Water: 0 sq mi (0.00 km^{2})
- Elevation: 1,178 ft (359 m)

Population (2020)
  - Total: 132
  - Estimate (2023): 132
  - Density: 825.3/sq mi (318.66/km^{2})
- Time zone: UTC-5 (Eastern (EST))
  - Summer (DST): UTC-4 (EDT)
- ZIP code: 44287
- Area code: 419
- FIPS code: 39-18308
- GNIS feature ID: 2398617

Congress is a village in Wayne County, Ohio, United States. The population was 132 at the 2020 census.

== History ==
Congress was originally called Waynesburg, and under the latter name was laid out in 1827.

== Geography ==
According to the United States Census Bureau, the village has a total area of 0.16 square miles (0.41 km^{2}), all of it land.

== Demographics ==
Historical population
Census	Pop.	Note	%±
1870	309		—
1880	301		−2.6%
1890	229		−23.9%
1900	198		−13.5%
1910	164		−17.2%
1920	123		−25.0%
1930	126		2.4%
1940	157		24.6%
1950	186		18.5%
1960	186		0.0%
1970	205		10.2%
1980	178		−13.2%
1990	162		−9.0%
2000	192		18.5%
2010	185		−3.6%
2020	132		−28.6%
2023 (est.)	132	Steady	0.0%
U.S. Decennial Census

=== 2010 census ===
As of the census of 2010, there were 185 people, 65 households, and 48 families living in the village. The population density was 1,156.3 inhabitants per square mile (446.4/km^{2}). There were 72 housing units at an average density of 450.0 per square mile (173.7/km^{2}). The racial makeup of the village was 97.3% White, 0.5% African American, 0.5% Asian, and 1.6% from two or more races. Hispanic or Latino of any race were 2.7% of the population.

There were 65 households, of which 40.0% had children under the age of 18 living with them, 55.4% were married couples living together, 15.4% had a female householder with no husband present, 3.1% had a male householder with no wife present, and 26.2% were non-families. 16.9% of all households were made up of individuals, and 4.6% had someone living alone who was 65 years of age or older. The average household size was 2.85 and the average family size was 3.15.

The median age in the village was 35.7 years. 29.7% of residents were under the age of 18; 10.3% were between the ages of 18 and 24; 21% were from 25 to 44; 28.5% were from 45 to 64; and 10.3% were 65 years of age or older. The gender makeup of the village was 45.4% male and 54.6% female.

=== 2000 census ===
As of the census of 2000, there were 192 people, 64 households, and 52 families living in the village. The population density was 1,154.2 inhabitants per square mile (445.6/km^{2}). There were 68 housing units at an average density of 408.8 per square mile (157.8/km^{2}). The racial makeup of the village was 97.40% White, and 2.60% from two or more races.

There were 64 households, out of which 29.7% had children under the age of 18 living with them, 73.4% were married couples living together, 3.1% had a female householder with no husband present, and 18.8% were non-families. 14.1% of all households were made up of individuals, and 6.3% had someone living alone who was 65 years of age or older. The average household size was 3.00 and the average family size was 3.35.

In the village, the population was spread out, with 25.5% under the age of 18, 10.9% from 18 to 24, 25.5% from 25 to 44, 29.2% from 45 to 64, and 8.9% who were 65 years of age or older. The median age was 35 years. For every 100 females there were 111.0 males. For every 100 females age 18 and over, there were 110.3 males.

The median income for a household in the village was $36,875, and the median income for a family was $42,083. Males had a median income of $22,321 versus $19,375 for females. The per capita income for the village was $14,911. About 9.1% of families and 4.1% of the population were below the poverty line, including none of those under the age of eighteen or sixty five or over.
