= Wayne County Athletic League =

The Wayne County Athletic League is an Ohio High School Athletic Association athletic league that began play in 1924, with member schools from Wayne and Ashland counties in Ohio.

== Current members ==
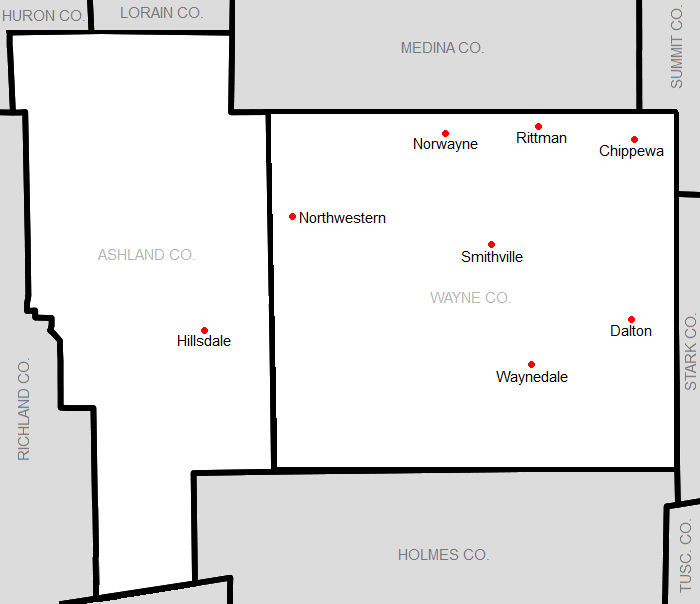
The member schools of the Wayne County Athletic League.

School	Nickname	Location	Colors	Tenure	Notes
Chippewa	Chipps	Doylestown	Blue, White	1924-	Known as Doylestown High School prior to 1971
Dalton	Bulldogs	Dalton	Orange, Black	1924-	
Hillsdale	Falcons	Jeromesville	Columbia Blue, Gold	1970-	
Northwestern	Huskies	West Salem	Blue, Gray	1951-	
Norwayne	Bobcats	Creston	Scarlet, Gray	1953-	
Rittman	Indians	Rittman	Red, White, Black	1924-1937; 1961-	
Smithville	Smithies	Smithville	Green, White	1924-	
Waynedale	Golden Bears	Apple Creek	Brown, Gold	1955-	

== Former members ==
School	Nickname	Location	Colors	Tenure	Notes
Apple Creek	Aces	Apple Creek	Black, Gold	1924-1955	consolidated into Waynedale
Big Prairie	Bobcats	Big Prairie	Black, Gold	1924-1937	left for Holmes County League
Burbank	Bombers	Burbank	Purple, White	1924-1953	consolidated into Norwayne
Chester	Pups	Chester Township	Blue, White	1924-1951	consolidated into Northwestern
Congress	Senators	Congress	Scarlet, Gray	1924-1951	consolidated into Northwestern
Creston	Panthers	Creston	Red, Black	1924-1953	consolidated into Norwayne
Fredericksburg	Freddies	Fredericksburg	Red, Black	1924-1955	consolidated into Waynedale
Marshallville	Tigers	Marshallville	Blue, Gold	1924-1938	consolidated into Dalton. Later transferred to Smithville in 1955
Paint Township	Pirates	Mount Eaton	Green, White	1924-1955	consolidated into Waynedale
Shreve	Trojans	Shreve	Red, White	1924-1963	consolidated into Triway
Sterling	Eagles	Sterling	Blue, Gold	1924-1953	consolidated into Norwayne
Triway	Titans	Wooster	Purple, White	1963-1970	left for Chippewa Conference
West Salem	Clippers	West Salem	Orange, Black	1924-1951	consolidated into Northwestern

== History ==
The Wayne Country Athletic Conference first formed in 1924, with founding members Apple Creek, Big Prairie, Burbank, Chester, Congress, Creston, Dalton, Doylestown, Fredericksburg, Marshallville, Mount Eaton/Paint Township, Rittman, Shreve, Smithville, Sterling, and West Salem.

In 1937, Rittman became the first school to leave the conference. The next year in 1938, Marshallville underwent a consolidation with Dalton.

In 1951, Northwestern High School was created following the consolidation of Chester, Congress and West Salem. Just two years later Norwayne was formed with the consolidation of Burbank, Creston and Sterling.

In 1954, the first official football season began for the league, with Dalton, Doylestown and Rittman becoming the first members to play in the conference. Shreve, Smithville newly created Waynedale, formed under the consolidation of Apple Creek, Fredericksburg and Paint Township, began conference play for football 2 years later in 1956.

In 1955, the former Marshallville high school students were merged with Smithville after consolidation with Dalton just years prior. Smithville formed a football team following this move.

in 1961, Rittman returned to the league 2 years later in 1963, Triway was formed and joined the league following the consolidation of Clinton, Franklin and Wooster townships. Northwestern began league football play in 1965.

In 1970, Triway left the league in favor of the Chippewa Conference. They were replaced by Hillsdale the same year.

In 1971, following the opening of their new high school, Doylestown changed their school name to Chippewa and remained in the conference

=== Ohio High School Athletic Association State Championships ===
- Baseball
  - 1933: West Salem
  - 1959: Northwestern
  - 1966: Northwestern
  - 2022: Waynedale (D-III)
  - 2023: Waynedale (D-III)
  - 2025: Waynedale (D-V)
  - 2026: Waynedale (D-V)
- Boys Basketball
  - 1957-58: Northwestern
  - 1964-65: Northwestern
- Football
  - 2011: Norwayne (D-IV)
- Softball
  - 1979: Hillsdale
  - 1994: Hillsdale
  - 1996: Hillsdale
  - 1999: Hillsdale
  - 2000: Hillsdale
  - 2006: Dalton (D-IV)
  - 2007: Dalton (D-IV)
  - 2010: Hillsdale (D-III)
- Boys Track & Field
  - 2022: Norwayne (D-III)
- Girls Track & Field
  - 1975: Chippewa
  - 2024: Smithville (D-III)
- Wrestling
  - 2011-12: Waynedale (D-III)
  - 2026: Waynedale (OHSWCA State Duals, D-III)

== See also ==
- Ohio High School Athletic Conferences
