= Burton City, Ohio =

Burton City
- Unincorporated community
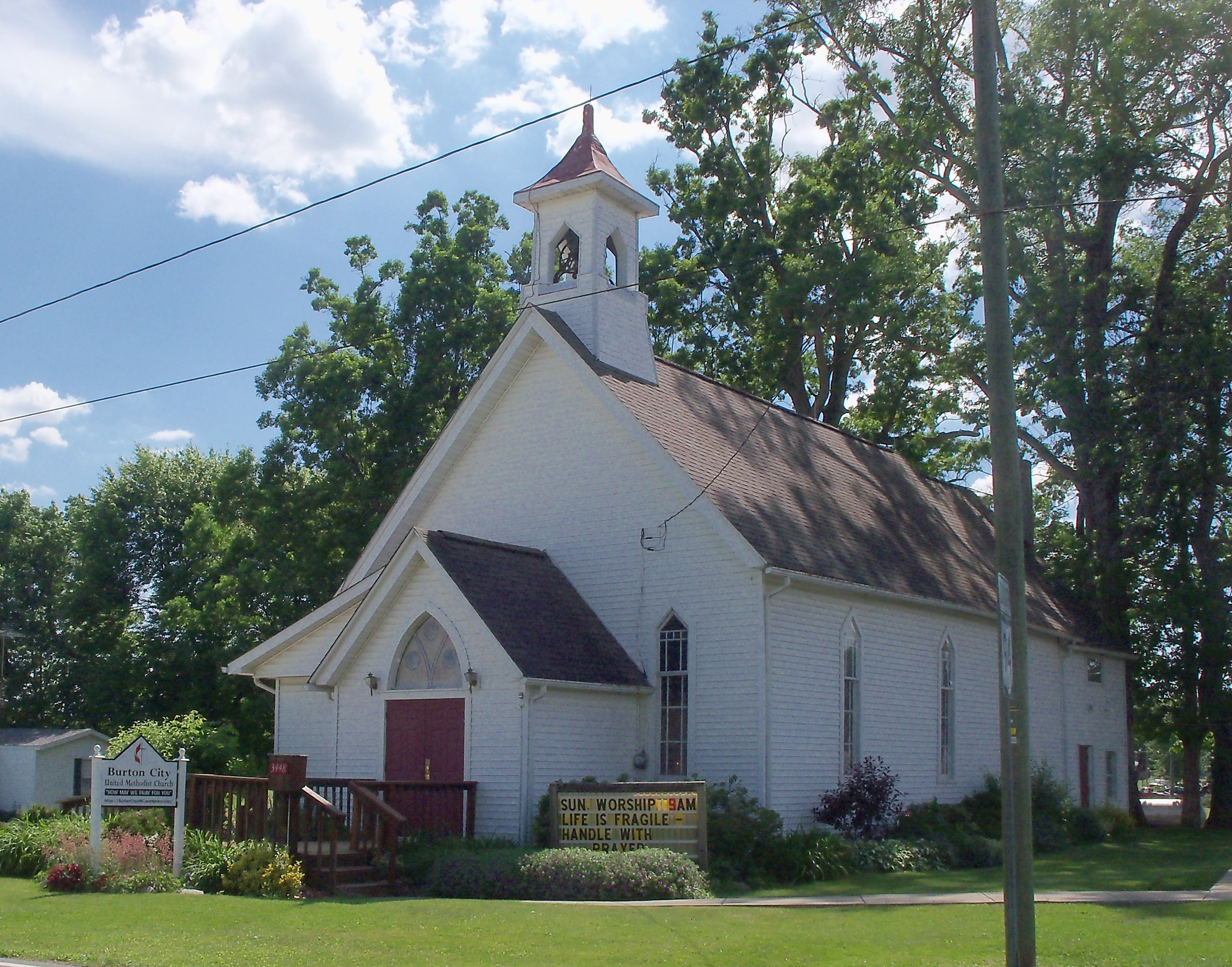
- Burton City's United Methodist Church

- Location of Burton City in Ohio
- Coordinates: 40°50′41″N 81°42′14″W
- Country: United States
- State: Ohio
- County: Wayne
- Elevation: 1,007 ft (307 m)
- Time zone: UTC-4 (EST)
  - Summer (DST): EDT
- Postal code: 44667
- GNIS feature ID: 1060912

Burton City is an unincorporated community in Wayne County, in the U.S. state of Ohio.

== History ==
Burton City was originally called Fairview, and under the latter name was laid out in 1850. A post office called Baughman was established in 1852, the name was changed to Burton City in 1872, and the post office closed in 1918.

== Geography ==
Burton City lies mainly on flat plains and is a little bit over halfway between the villages of Dalton and Marshallville. The town lies along the Newman Creek which eventually flows into the Tuscarawas River. The town is near Orrville, and is considered by some online mapping services and websites to be a suburb of the city.

== Demographics ==
As an unincorporated community, Burton City's population is not counted independently by the US census and is rounded into Orrville's, which also shares a ZIP code of 44667 with Burton City.

== Infrastructure and transport ==
Burton City has no maritime ports, though it is bisected east–west by freight railroad tracks presently owned and operated by Norfolk Southern. Burton City is bisected north–south by Ohio State Route 94, the main road through, in and out of the unincorporated community as well as giving access to Interstate 76 fifteen miles to the north and U.S. Route 30 three miles to the south. Burton City relies on Akron–Canton Airport for commercial air travel (with some longer-distance routings opting for Cleveland Hopkins International Airport).
