= Canaan Township, Wayne County, Ohio =

Township in Ohio, US

- Township
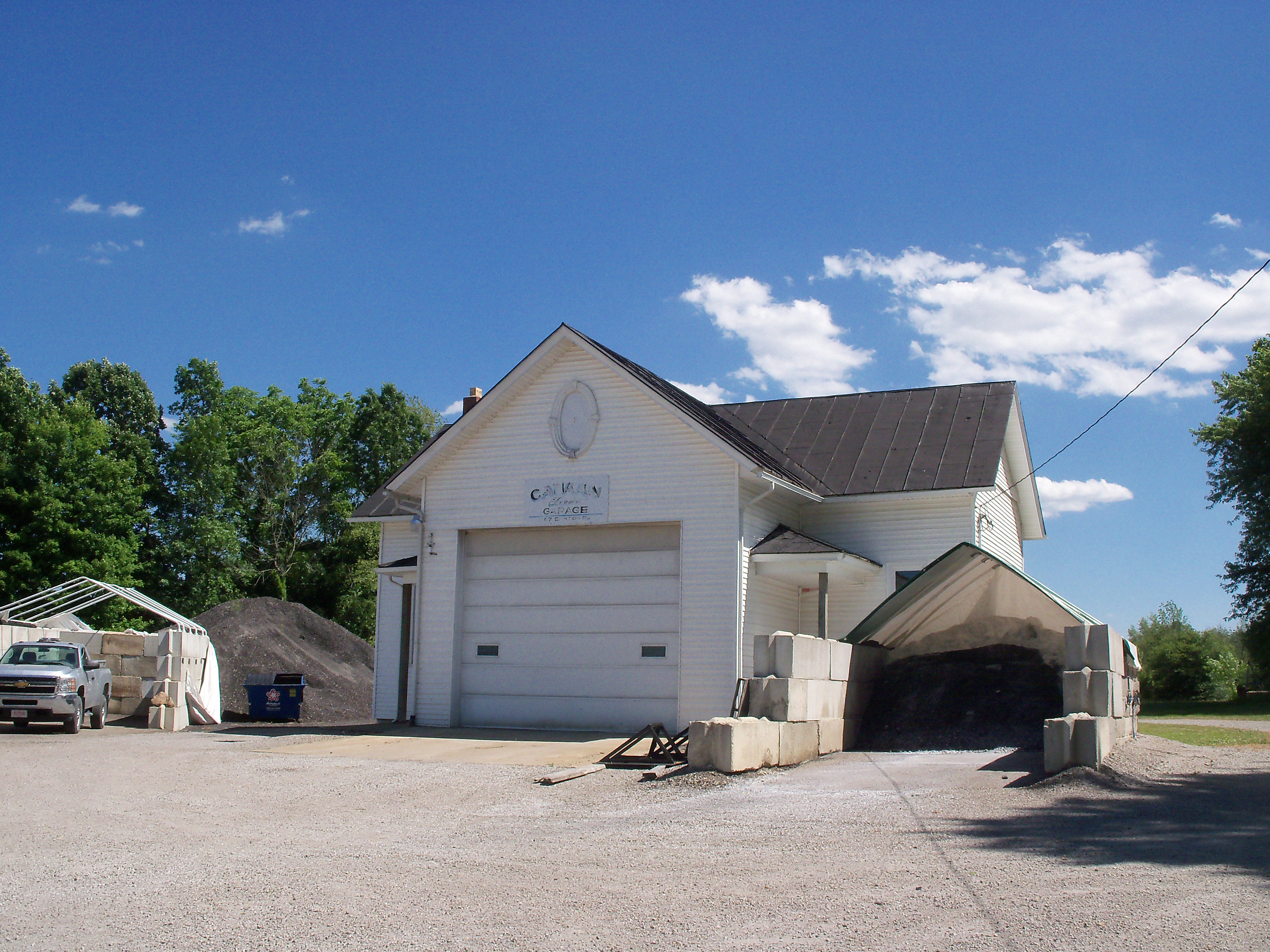
- Town Hall

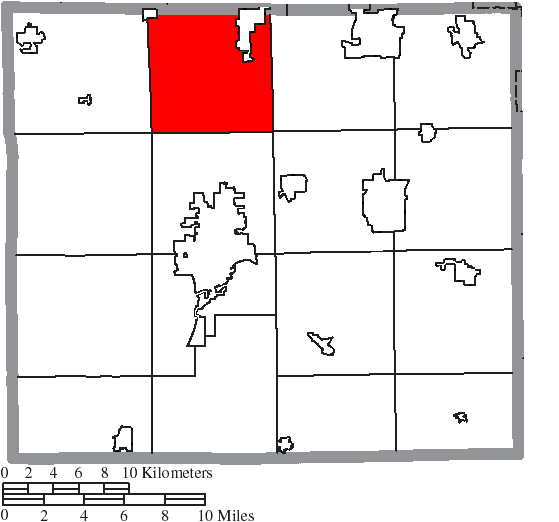
- Location of Canaan Township in Wayne County
- Coordinates: 40°58′12″N 81°55′31″W
- Country: United States
- State: Ohio
- County: Wayne

Area
  - Total: 37.0 sq mi (95.8 km^{2})
  - Land: 37.0 sq mi (95.8 km^{2})
  - Water: 0 sq mi (0.0 km^{2})
- Elevation: 1,020 ft (310 m)

Population (2020)
  - Total: 5,134
  - Density: 139/sq mi (53.6/km^{2})
- Time zone: UTC-5 (Eastern (EST))
  - Summer (DST): UTC-4 (EDT)
- FIPS code: 39-11276
- GNIS feature ID: 1087149
- Website: https://www.canaantownship.us/

Canaan Township is one of the sixteen townships of Wayne County, Ohio, United States. The 2020 census found 5,134 people in the township.

== Geography ==
Located in the northern part of the county, it borders the following townships:

- Westfield Township, Medina County - north
- Guilford Township, Medina County - northeast corner
- Milton Township - east
- Green Township - southeast corner
- Wayne Township - south
- Chester Township - southwest corner
- Congress Township - west
- Harrisville Township, Medina County - northwest

Parts of two villages are located in Canaan Township: Burbank in the northwest, and Creston in the northeast.

== Name and history ==
Statewide, other Canaan Townships are located in Athens, Madison, and Morrow counties.

== Government ==
The township is governed by a three-member board of trustees, who are elected in November of odd-numbered years to a four-year term beginning on the following January 1. Two are elected in the year after the presidential election and one is elected in the year before it. There is also an elected township fiscal officer, who serves a four-year term beginning on April 1 of the year after the election, which is held in November of the year before the presidential election. Vacancies in the fiscal officership or on the board of trustees are filled by the remaining trustees.
