= Northwestern High School (West Salem, Ohio) =

Location
- 7473 N Elyria Road; Wayne County; West Salem, Wayne County, Ohio 44287; United States
- Coordinates: 40°53′21″N 82°06′27″W

Information
- Type: Public high school
- Established: 1951
- School district: Northwestern Local School District
- Superintendent: Julie McCumber (Interim)
- Principal: Tyler Keener
- Teaching staff: 24.31 (FTE)
- Grades: 9-12
- Student to teacher ratio: 13.74
- Colors: Blue and gray
- Athletics conference: Wayne County Athletic League
- Sports: Football, golf, cheerleading, soccer, cross country, basketball, wrestling, indoor track (club), baseball, track and field, softball, volleyball
- Mascot: Husky
- Team name: Huskies
- Rival: Norwayne Bobcats
- Graduates: 94%
- Website: Home Of The Huskies

Northwestern High School is a public high school in West Salem, Ohio. It is the only high school in the Northwestern Local Schools district, which is located in north-west Wayne County, Ohio. Their nickname is the Huskies.

== History ==
Northwestern was created in 1951 from a merger of the school districts in Chester Township, Congress, and West Salem. The school name came from the district's northwestern location within Wayne County.

== Athletics ==
Northwestern is one of eight high schools that compete in the Wayne County Athletic League.

=== Ohio High School Athletic Association State Championships ===
- Boys' basketball – 1958, 1965
- Boys' baseball – 1933*, 1959, 1966
