= Congress Township, Wayne County, Ohio =

Township in Ohio, US

- Township
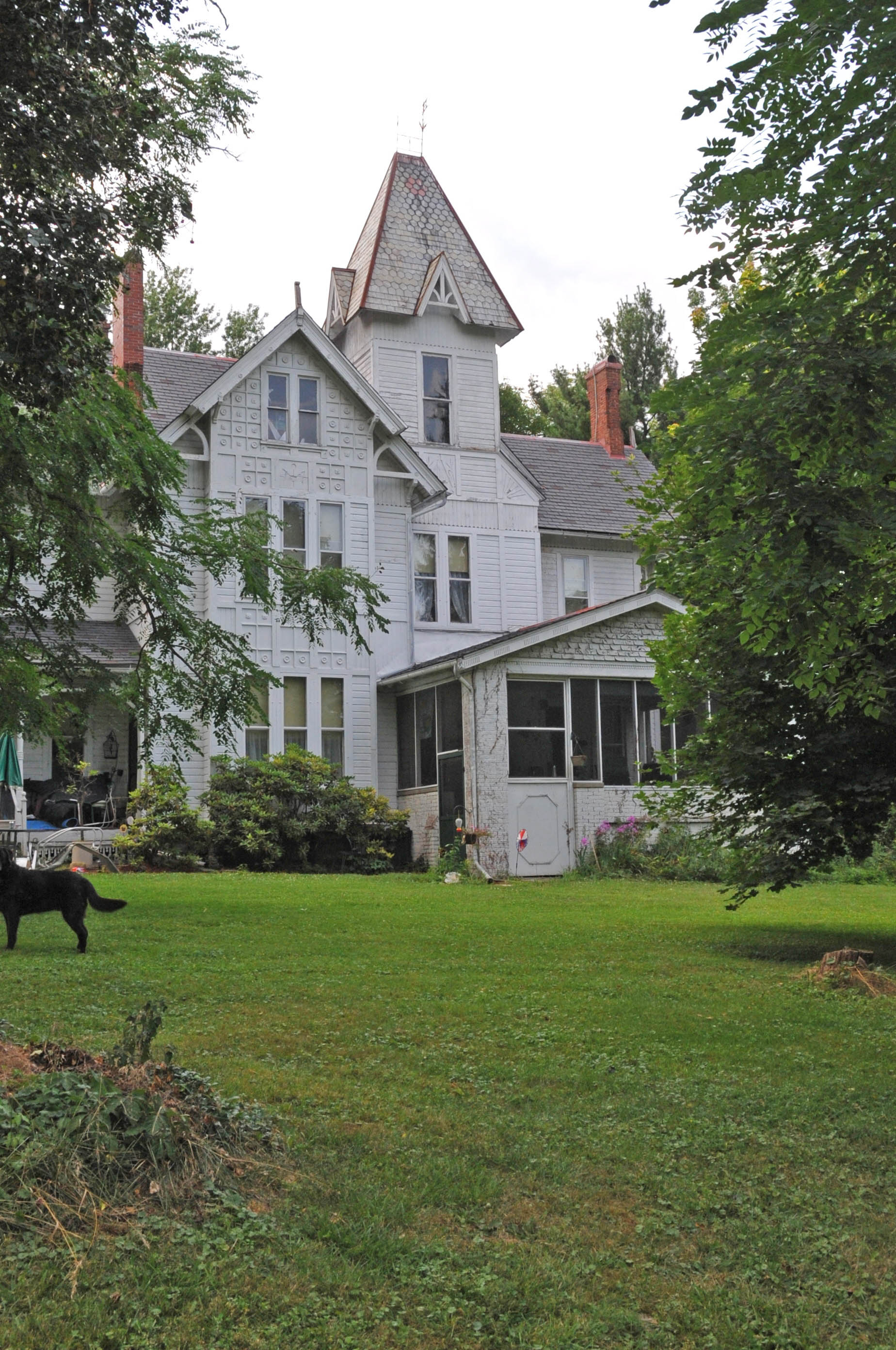
- Deerlick Farmhouse

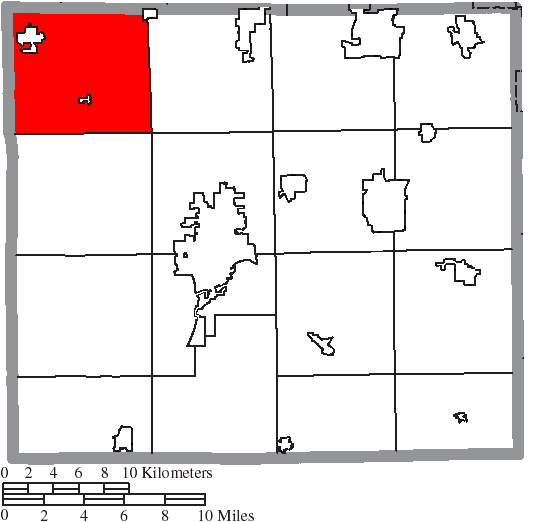
- Location of Congress Township in Wayne County
- Coordinates: 40°57′7″N 82°4′42″W
- Country: United States
- State: Ohio
- County: Wayne

Area
  - Total: 43.5 sq mi (112.6 km^{2})
  - Land: 43.4 sq mi (112.5 km^{2})
  - Water: 0.039 sq mi (0.1 km^{2})
- Elevation: 1,132 ft (345 m)

Population (2020)
  - Total: 4,439
  - Density: 102/sq mi (39.5/km^{2})
- Time zone: UTC-5 (Eastern (EST))
  - Summer (DST): UTC-4 (EDT)
- ZIP code: 44287
- Area code: 419
- FIPS code: 39-18322
- GNIS feature ID: 1087153

Congress Township is one of the sixteen townships of Wayne County, Ohio, United States. The 2020 census found 4,439 people in the township.

== Geography ==
Located in the northwestern corner of the county, it borders the following townships:

- Harrisville Township, Medina County - north
- Canaan Township - east
- Wayne Township - southeast corner
- Chester Township - south
- Perry Township, Ashland County - southwest corner
- Jackson Township, Ashland County - west
- Homer Township, Medina County - northwest

Three villages are located in Congress Township:

- Part of Burbank, in the northeast
- Congress, in the south
- West Salem, in the northwest

== Name and history ==
Statewide, the only other Congress Township is located in Morrow County.

== Government ==
The township is governed by a three-member board of trustees, who are elected in November of odd-numbered years to a four-year term beginning on the following January 1. Two are elected in the year after the presidential election and one is elected in the year before it. There is also an elected township fiscal officer, who serves a four-year term beginning on April 1 of the year after the election, which is held in November of the year before the presidential election. Vacancies in the fiscal officership or on the board of trustees are filled by the remaining trustees.

== Notable people ==
- Henry Totten, Wisconsin State Assemblyman and business, was born in the township.
