= Plain Township, Wayne County, Ohio =

Township in Ohio, US

- Township
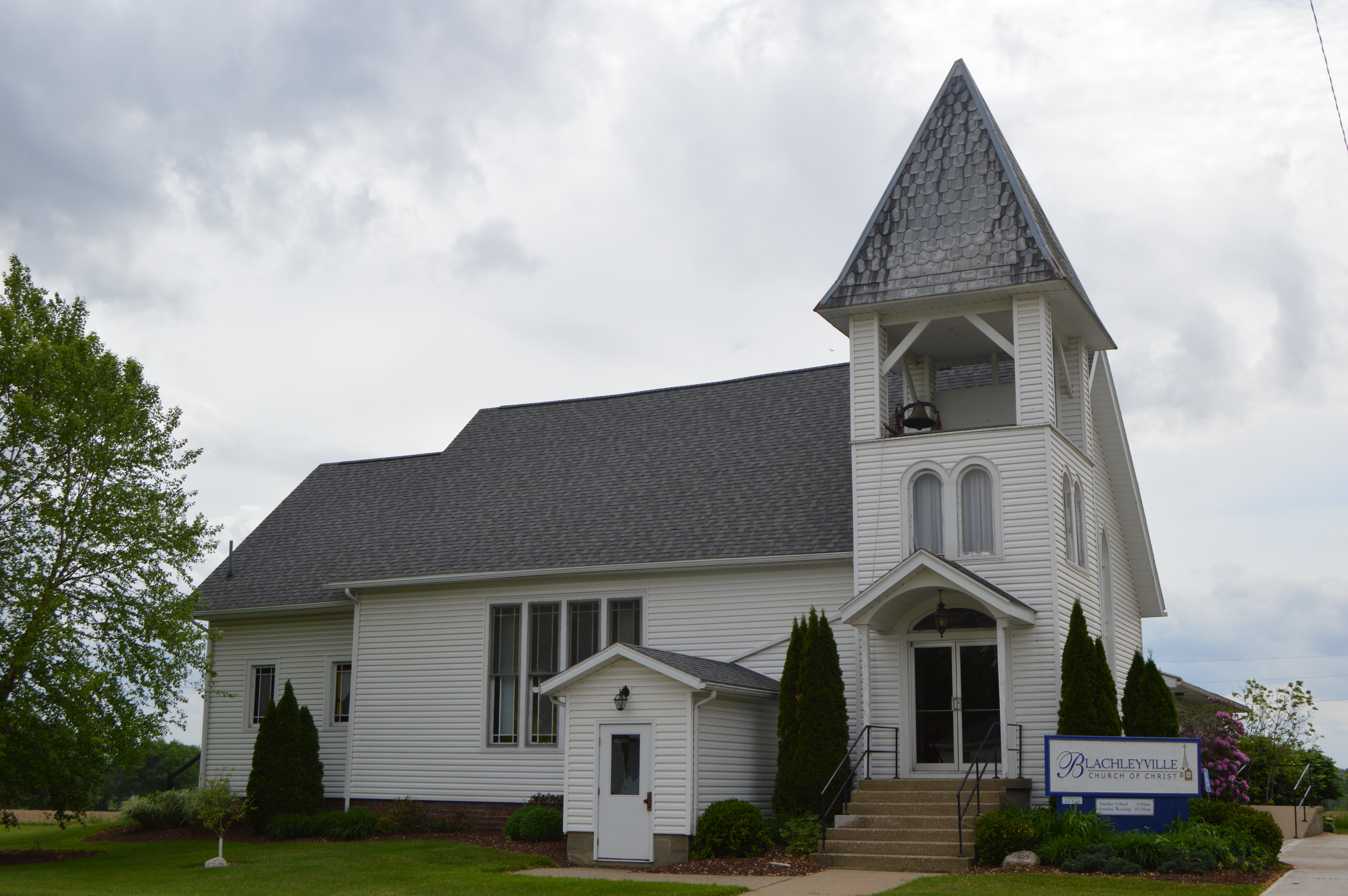
- Blachleyville Church of Christ

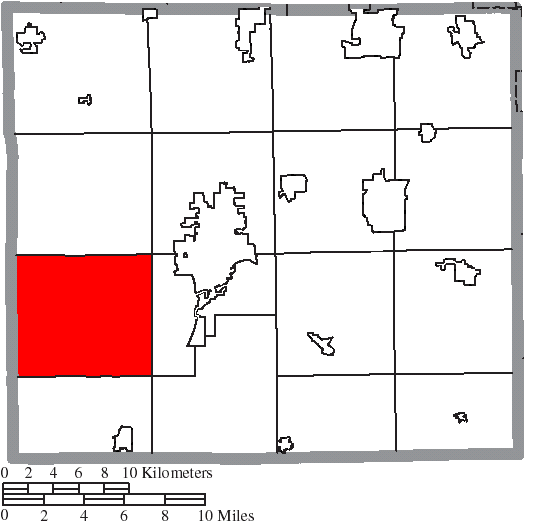
- Location of Plain Township in Wayne County
- Coordinates: 40°46′45″N 82°3′29″W
- Country: United States
- State: Ohio
- County: Wayne

Area
  - Total: 41.7 sq mi (108.0 km^{2})
  - Land: 41.7 sq mi (108.0 km^{2})
  - Water: 0 sq mi (0.0 km^{2})
- Elevation: 1,060 ft (323 m)

Population (2020)
  - Total: 3,069
  - Density: 73.60/sq mi (28.42/km^{2})
- Time zone: UTC-5 (Eastern (EST))
  - Summer (DST): UTC-4 (EDT)
- FIPS code: 39-62995
- GNIS feature ID: 1087159

Plain Township is one of the sixteen townships of Wayne County, Ohio, United States. The 2020 census found 3,069 people in the township.

== Geography ==
Located in the western part of the county, it borders the following townships:

- Chester Township - north
- Wayne Township - northeast corner
- Wooster Township - east
- Franklin Township - southeast corner
- Clinton Township - south
- Lake Township, Ashland County - southwest corner
- Mohican Township, Ashland County - west
- Perry Township, Ashland County - northwest corner

No municipalities are located in Plain Township, although the unincorporated community of Funk lies in the southwestern part of the township.

== Name and history ==
Statewide, other Plain Townships are located in Franklin, Stark, and Wood counties.

== Government ==
The township is governed by a three-member board of trustees, who are elected in November of odd-numbered years to a four-year term beginning on the following January 1. Two are elected in the year after the presidential election and one is elected in the year before it. There is also an elected township fiscal officer, who serves a four-year term beginning on April 1 of the year after the election, which is held in November of the year before the presidential election. Vacancies in the fiscal officership or on the board of trustees are filled by the remaining trustees.
