= Norwayne High School =

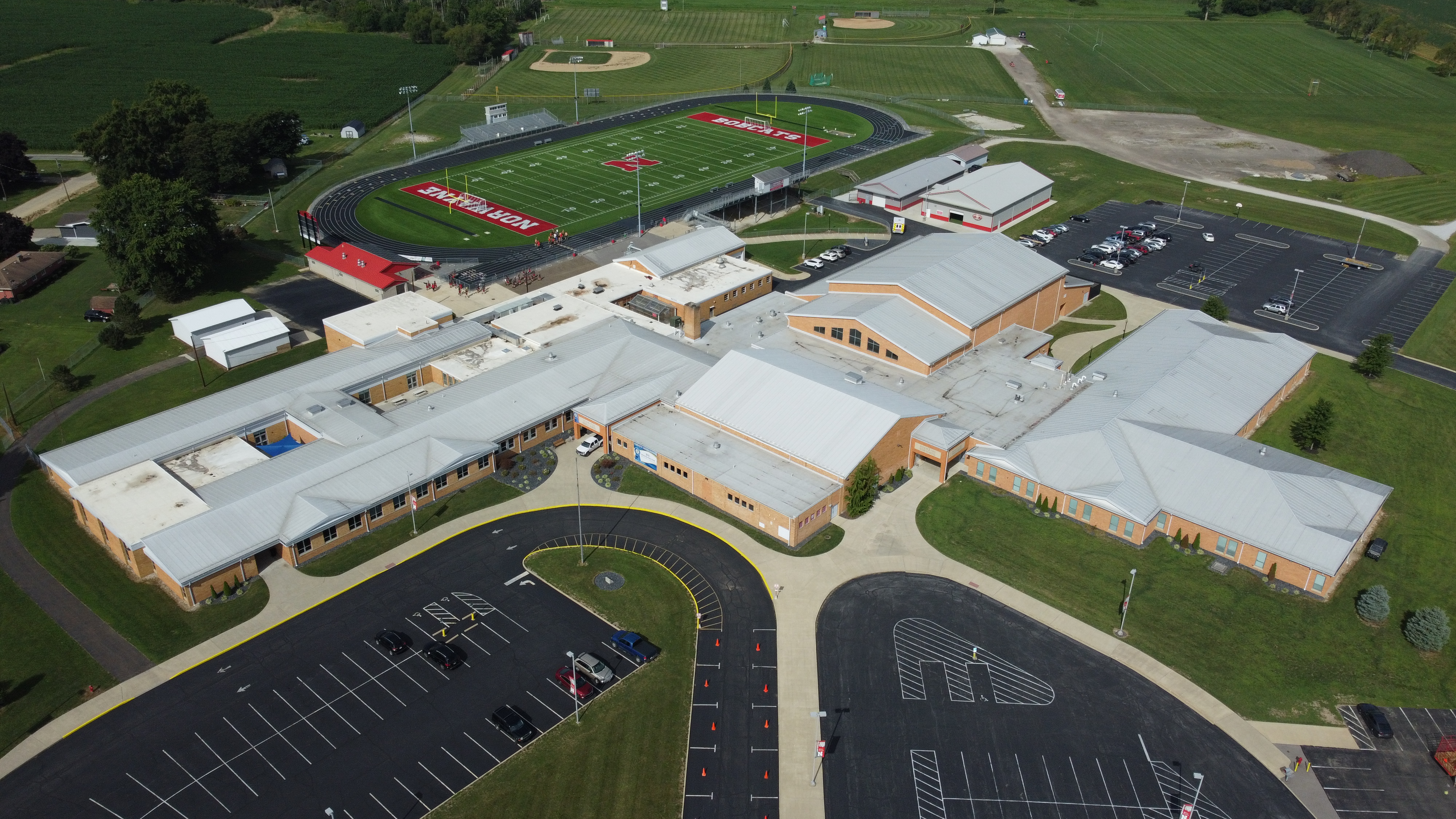
- Norwayne High School and Middle School Complex

Location
- 350 S. Main Street; Creston, Ohio 44217; United States; 40°57′55″N 81°54′04″W

Information
- Type: Public
- Established: 1953
- School district: Norwayne Local School District
- Principal: Doug Zimmerly
- Teaching staff: 23.26 (on FTE basis)
- Grades: 9 to 12
- Enrollment: 417 (2023-2024)
- Student to teacher ratio: 17.93
- Colors: Scarlet & Gray
- Athletics conference: WCAL
- Mascot: Bobcat
- Website: Norwayne Local Schools

Norwayne High School is a public high school in Creston, Ohio. It is the only high school in the Norwayne Local School District, which also consists of a middle school in Creston, and one elementary school in Creston (which opened in January 2010). Their mascot is the Bobcat. The name 'Norwayne' is derived from its location in northern Wayne County. The district was approved for consolidation in 1950 by merging the Burbank, Creston, and Milton Local (Sterling) school districts together, and the school opened in the fall of 1953.

This school has 21 teachers and about 450 students for a 1:21 student to teacher ratio.

In June 2009, the school district started building the new Norwayne High School, which was completed in August 2010. This new building was a part of the Ohio Schools Facility Commission. The new building has a wide variety of new technologies, including Mimio Interactive Whiteboards, projectors, in-ceiling speakers, computers and teacher microphones in every classroom. The building also features air-conditioning. It was also at this time (beginning with the 2010–11 school year) that the district decided to change its name from North Central Local to Norwayne Local. The renaming was done in addition to preventing a confusion with North Central High School in Pioneer, Ohio.

== Notable alumni ==
- Ryan Brown, cartoonist, 1980 graduate. Best known for his work on Teenage Mutant Ninja Turtles.
- Kollin Moore, 2015 graduate, sport wrestler.
- Dwight Schar, 1960 graduate, Executive Chairman, NVR, Inc.
- Latecia E. Wiles – Judge of the Wayne County Court of Common Pleas, Probate and Juvenile Divisions since 2012; first woman appointed to that position.
- Nicole Camp – American distance runner, two-time Cleveland Marathon winner, and three-time U.S. Olympic Marathon Trials competitor.
- W. Michael Jarrett (1983) – Founder and CEO of Jarrett Logistics Systems and recipient of the 2017 EY Entrepreneur of the Year Award for Manufacturing and Distribution in Northeast Ohio.
- Dillon Morlock — statewide athlete-of-the-year recognition and NCAA All-American achievement.

== Ohio High School Athletic Association State Championships ==
Football

- 2011: The Norwayne Bobcats football team, led by head coach Joe Harbour, won the school's first state championship by defeating Kenton High School 48–42 on December 3, 2011. The game took place at Paul Brown Tiger Stadium in Massillon, Ohio.

=== Wrestling ===
- Kollin Moore, state champion
- Zachary Steiner, 2x state champion
- Gavin Stika, state champion

Track and Field

- Boys 2022 state champs
- Girls 2023 state runner up
- Cody Miller, 2x state champion 400 dash
