= Wayne Township, Wayne County, Ohio =

Township in Ohio, US

- Township
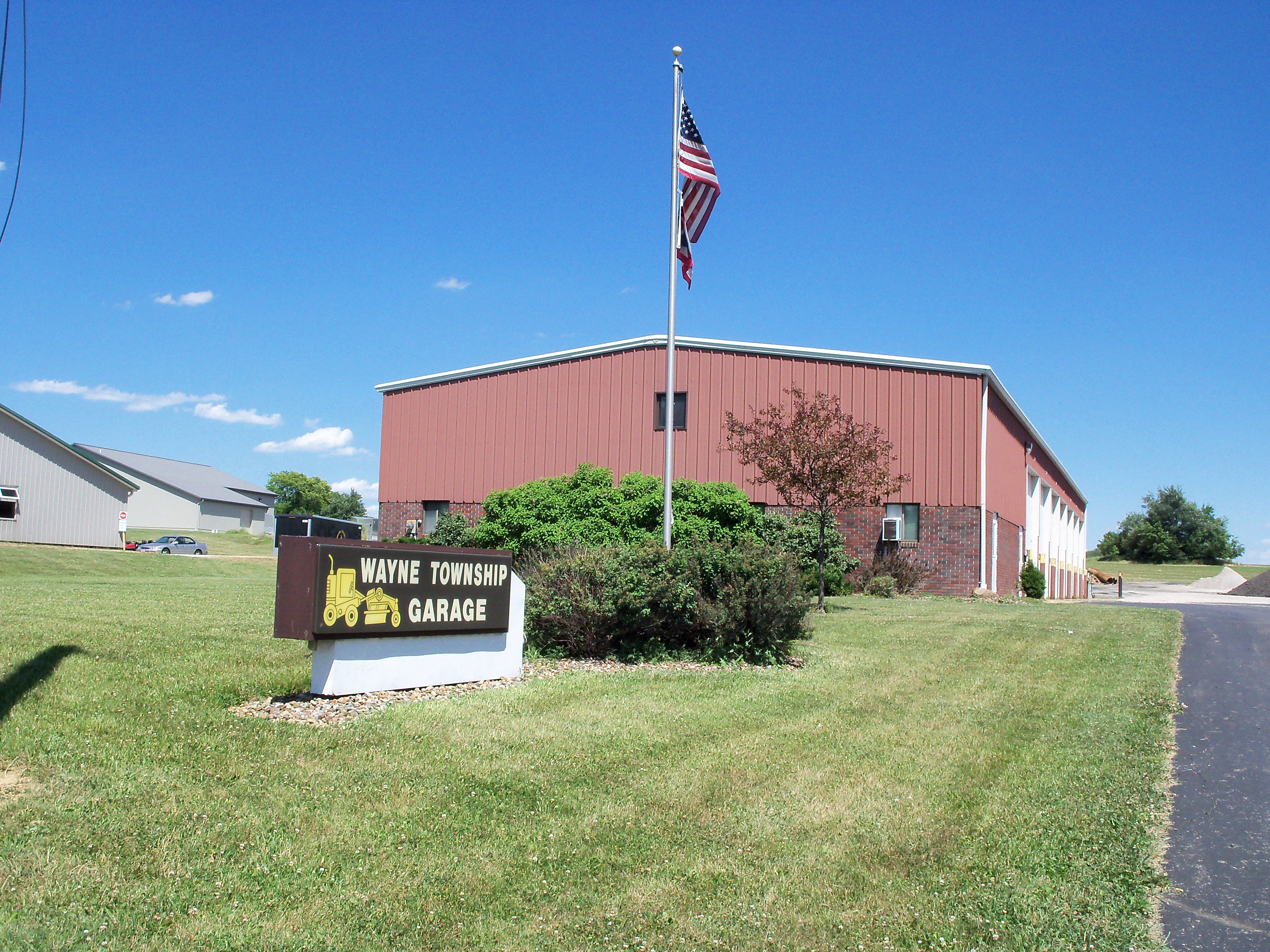
- Town Hall on Route 3

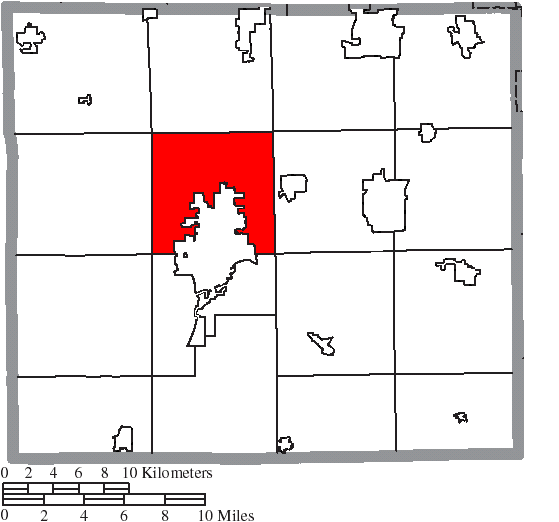
- Location of Wayne Township in Wayne County
- Coordinates: 40°51′8″N 81°56′17″W
- Country: United States
- State: Ohio
- County: Wayne

Area
  - Total: 28.0 sq mi (72.6 km^{2})
  - Land: 28.0 sq mi (72.5 km^{2})
  - Water: 0.039 sq mi (0.1 km^{2})
- Elevation: 1,099 ft (335 m)

Population (2020)
  - Total: 4,005
  - Density: 143/sq mi (55.2/km^{2})
- Time zone: UTC-5 (Eastern (EST))
  - Summer (DST): UTC-4 (EDT)
- FIPS code: 39-82320
- GNIS feature ID: 1087162

Wayne Township is one of the sixteen townships of Wayne County, Ohio, United States. The 2020 census found 4,005 people in the township.

== Geography ==
Located in the central part of the county, it borders the following townships:

- Canaan Township - north
- Milton Township - northeast corner
- Green Township - east
- East Union Township - southeast corner
- Wooster Township - south
- Plain Township - southwest corner
- Chester Township - west
- Congress Township - northwest corner

The unincorporated communities of Devil Town (previously known as Tannersville) and Mechanicsburg (not to be confused with the village of Mechanicsburg, which is in Champaign County) are located in the southwestern quadrant of the township. Devil Town is situated at the intersection of Mechanicsburg Road and Clear Creek Valley Road. Mechanicsburg is centered around the intersection of Mechanicsburg Road and Smithville Western Road.

The city of Wooster, the county seat of Wayne County, occupies much of southern Wayne Township.

== Name and history ==
It is one of twenty Wayne Townships statewide.

== Government ==
The township is governed by a three-member board of trustees, who are elected in November of odd-numbered years to a four-year term beginning on the following January 1. Two are elected in the year after the presidential election and one is elected in the year before it. There is also an elected township fiscal officer, who serves a four-year term beginning on April 1 of the year after the election, which is held in November of the year before the presidential election. Vacancies in the fiscal officership or on the board of trustees are filled by the remaining trustees.
