= Overton, Ohio =

Unincorporated community in Ohio, U.S.

Coordinates: 40°51′53″N 82°00′37″W

Overton is an unincorporated community in Wayne County, in the U.S. state of Ohio. It lies slightly northwest of the county seat, Wooster, Ohio, and southwest of West Salem, Ohio.

== History ==
Overton was platted at an unknown date. A post office called Overton was established in 1892, and remained in operation until 1917.

== Weather ==
=== Winter ===
Overton sees average daily highs of 2 °C and average nightly lows of -7 °C, with cold spells bringing the weather down to lows of -20 °C.

=== Spring ===
Weather is variable at this time of year, with early March averages of 5 °C rising to 25 °C by late May.

=== Summer ===
Overton has very humid summers, which can make average highs of 30 °C and lows of 16 °C feel significantly warmer than they actually are.

=== Autumn ===
Similarly to spring, temperatures change quickly, from a 25 °C average in September, to a 10 °C average by the end of November.
