= Reedsburg =

Reedsburg may refer to the following place in the United States:

- Reedsburg Dam, a dam in the state of Michigan
- Reedsburg, Ohio, historic unincorporated community in Ohio
- Reedsburg, Wisconsin, city in the state of Wisconsin
  - Reedsburg Municipal Airport
  - School District of Reedsburg
    - Reedsburg Area High School
  - Reedsburg (town), Wisconsin, adjacent to the city of Reedsburg
- Reedsburg Subdivision, railway terminating in the city of Reedsburg
