= Devil Town (disambiguation) =

Devil Town is an American independent mystery film, written and directed by Harvey Mitkas.

Devil Town may also refer to:

- Devil Town, Ohio, an unincorporated community in Wayne County, Ohio, United States
- "Devil Town", a song by Bright Eyes from Noise Floor (Rarities: 1998–2005), 2006
- "Devil Town", a song by Cavetown, 2018
- "Devil Town", a song by Daniel Johnston from 1990, 1990
- "Devil Town", a Daniel Johnston cover by Tony Lucca from Friday Night Lights, 2007

== See also ==
- Devil's Town, a rock formation in southern Serbia
