= Perry Township, Ashland County, Ohio =

Township in Ohio, US

- Township
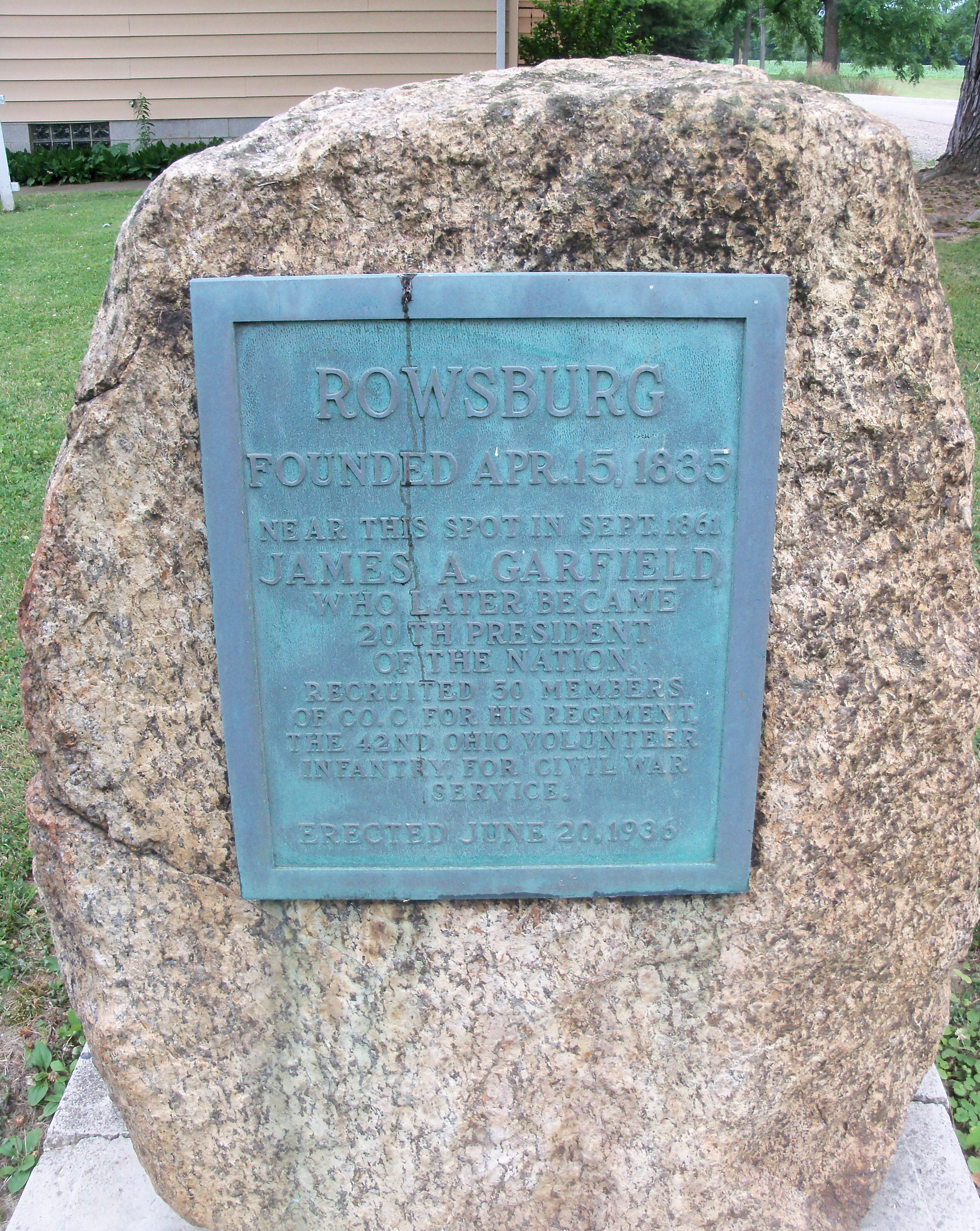
- James A. Garfield recruited township men to Company O of the 42nd Ohio Infantry

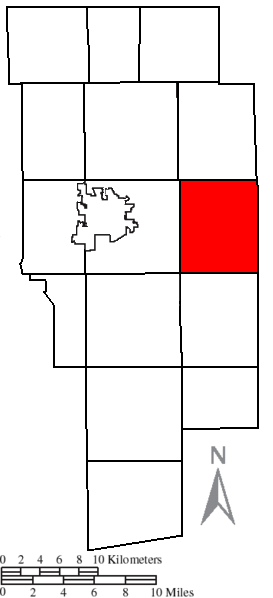
- Location of Perry Township in Ashland County
- Coordinates: 40°51′44″N 82°10′2″W
- Country: United States
- State: Ohio
- County: Ashland

Area
  - Total: 30.4 sq mi (78.8 km^{2})
  - Land: 30.3 sq mi (78.5 km^{2})
  - Water: 0.12 sq mi (0.3 km^{2})
- Elevation: 1,175 ft (358 m)

Population (2020)
  - Total: 2,024
  - Density: 66/sq mi (25.4/km^{2})
- Time zone: UTC-5 (Eastern (EST))
  - Summer (DST): UTC-4 (EDT)
- FIPS code: 39-61756
- GNIS feature ID: 1085713
- Website: https://www.perrytownshipashlandcounty.com/

Perry Township is one of the fifteen townships of Ashland County, Ohio, United States. The population was 2,024 at the 2020 census.

== Geography ==
Located in the eastern part of the county, it borders the following townships:

- Jackson Township - north
- Congress Township, Wayne County - northeast corner
- Chester Township, Wayne County - east
- Plain Township, Wayne County - southeast corner
- Mohican Township - south
- Vermillion Township - southwest corner
- Montgomery Township - west

No municipalities are located in Perry Township.

== Name and history ==
Perry Township was organized in 1814.

It is one of twenty-six Perry Townships statewide.

== Government ==
The township is governed by a three-member board of trustees who are elected in November of odd-numbered years to a four-year term beginning on the following January 1. Two trustees are elected in the year after the presidential election, and one is elected in the year before it. Additionally, there is an elected township fiscal officer who serves a four-year term beginning on April 1 of the year after the election, which is held in November of the year before the presidential election. Vacancies in the fiscal officer position or on the board of trustees are filled by the remaining trustees.
