= Moreland, Ohio =

Unincorporated community in Ohio, U.S.

Coordinates: 40°42′43″N 81°56′42″W

Moreland is an unincorporated community in Wayne County, in the U.S. state of Ohio.

== History ==
Moreland was platted in 1829. Variant names were Moorefield, Mooreland, Moorland, and Morland. The community derives its name from George Morr, the original owner of the town site. A post office called Moorland was established in 1831, and remained in operation until 1902.
