= Marshallville, Ohio =

- Village
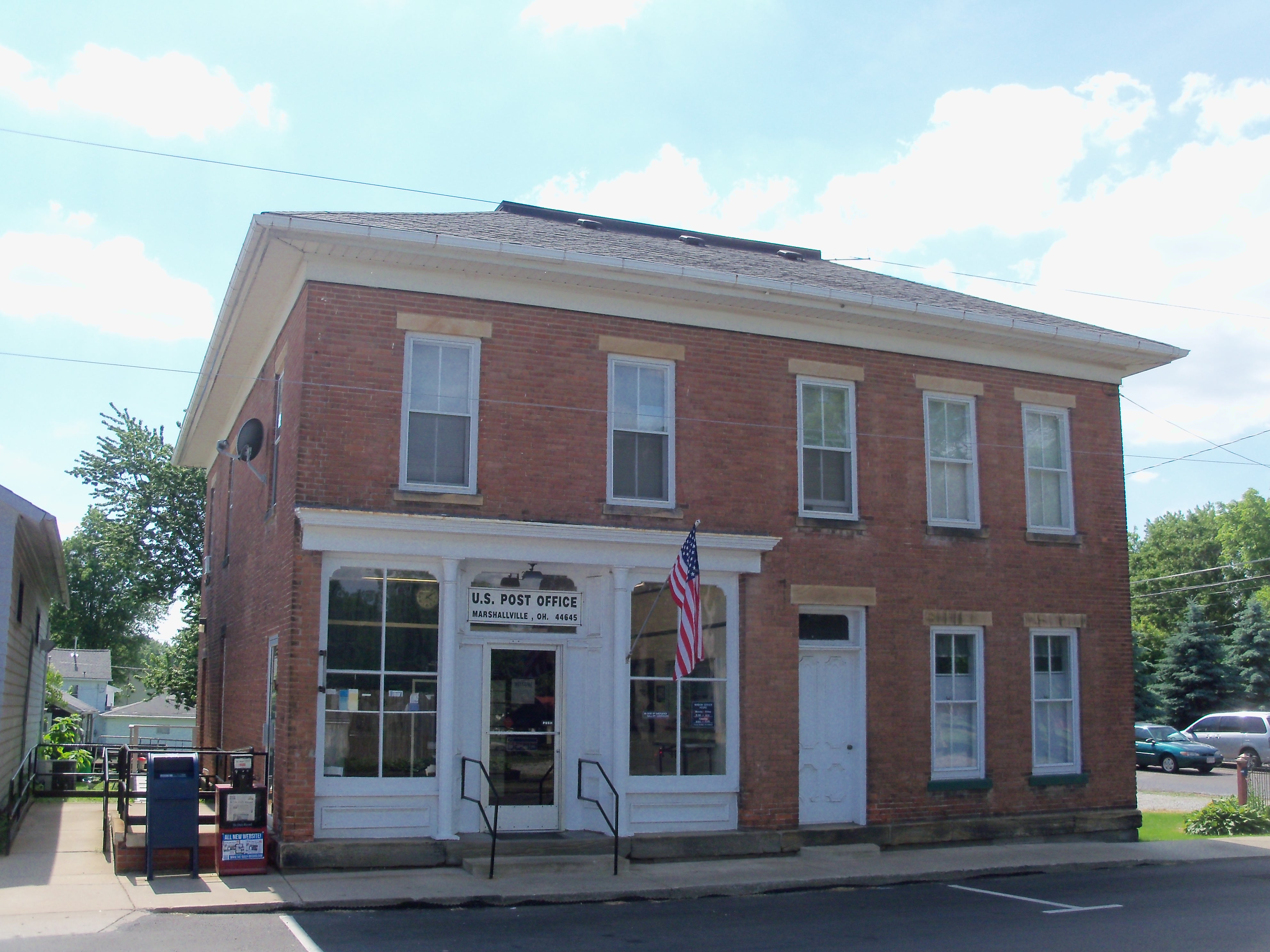
- Post Office

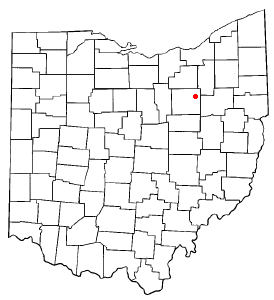
- Location of Marshallville, Ohio

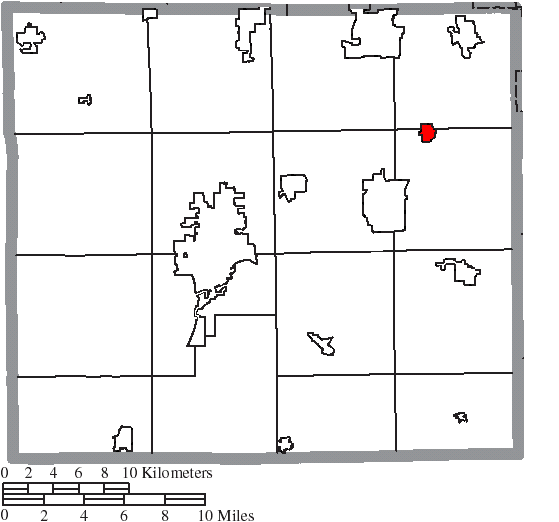
- Location of Marshallville in Wayne County
- Coordinates: 40°53′59″N 81°43′59″W
- Country: United States
- State: Ohio
- County: Wayne

Area
  - Total: 0.59 sq mi (1.53 km^{2})
  - Land: 0.59 sq mi (1.53 km^{2})
  - Water: 0 sq mi (0.00 km^{2})
- Elevation: 1,112 ft (339 m)

Population (2020)
  - Total: 789
  - Density: 1,335/sq mi (515.4/km^{2})
- Time zone: UTC-5 (Eastern (EST))
  - Summer (DST): UTC-4 (EDT)
- ZIP code: 44645
- Area code: 330
- FIPS code: 39-48048
- GNIS feature ID: 2399263
- Website: Village website

Marshallville is a village in Wayne County, Ohio. The population was 789 at the time of the 2020 census. Marshallville was originally called Bristol, and under the latter name was laid out in 1817.

== Geography ==
According to the United States Census Bureau, the village has a total area of 0.57 square miles (1.48 km^{2}), all of it land.

== Demographics ==
Historical population
Census	Pop.	Note	%±
1870	322		—
1880	376		16.8%
1890	366		−2.7%
1900	357		−2.5%
1910	294		−17.6%
1920	295		0.3%
1930	324		9.8%
1940	373		15.1%
1950	458		22.8%
1960	611		33.4%
1970	693		13.4%
1980	788		13.7%
1990	758		−3.8%
2000	826		9.0%
2010	756		−8.5%
2020	789		4.4%
U.S. Decennial Census

=== 2010 census ===
As of the census of 2010, there were 756 people, 291 households, and 222 families living in the village. The population density was 1,326.3 inhabitants per square mile (512.1/km^{2}). There were 311 housing units at an average density of 545.6 per square mile (210.7/km^{2}). The racial makeup of the village was 98.4% White, 0.3% African American, 0.8% Native American, and 0.5% from two or more races. Hispanic or Latino of any race were 0.5% of the population.

There were 291 households, of which 36.8% had children under the age of 18 living with them, 58.4% were married couples living together, 9.3% had a female householder with no husband present, 8.6% had a male householder with no wife present, and 23.7% were non-families. 20.3% of all households were made up of individuals, and 8.9% had someone living alone who was 65 years of age or older. The average household size was 2.60 and the average family size was 2.96.

The median age in the village was 39.3 years. 24.1% of residents were under the age of 18; 8.2% were between the ages of 18 and 24; 26.2% were from 25 to 44; 27.9% were from 45 to 64; and 13.6% were 65 years of age or older. The gender makeup of the village was 49.6% male and 50.4% female.

=== 2000 census ===
As of the census of 2000, there were 826 people, 302 households, and 233 families living in the village. The population density was 1,471.4 inhabitants per square mile (568.1/km^{2}). There were 310 housing units at an average density of 552.2 per square mile (213.2/km^{2}). The racial makeup of the village was 97.58% White, 0.12% African American, 1.09% Native American, 0.36% from other races, and 0.85% from two or more races. Hispanic or Latino of any race were 1.33% of the population.

There were 302 households, out of which 39.4% had children under the age of 18 living with them, 66.2% were married couples living together, 7.6% had a female householder with no husband present, and 22.8% were non-families. 19.9% of all households were made up of individuals, and 9.6% had someone living alone who was 65 years of age or older. The average household size was 2.74 and the average family size was 3.14.

In the village, the population was spread out, with 29.3% under the age of 18, 6.8% from 18 to 24, 32.0% from 25 to 44, 21.7% from 45 to 64, and 10.3% who were 65 years of age or older. The median age was 35 years. For every 100 females there were 101.0 males. For every 100 females age 18 and over, there were 94.7 males.

The median income for a household in the village was $42,632, and the median income for a family was $44,722. Males had a median income of $31,250 versus $23,125 for females. The per capita income for the village was $14,156. About 3.3% of families and 5.9% of the population were below the poverty line, including 6.1% of those under age 18 and 10.8% of those age 65 or over.

== Education ==
Marshallville students attend Green Local Schools in nearby Smithville.

Marshallville had a three-year high school until 1938 when the State of Ohio told them they could not operate as a three-year school. The building was then closed and students were sent to school in Dalton. After the state discovered they were going across another district (Orrville) to get to school, they merged their old district into Smithville's in 1955. The Marshallville Tigers were one of the original members of the Wayne County Athletic League's "B" League.

== Notable people ==
- Joseph Banks Rhine, botanist and father of parapsychology
- Daniel Sidney Warner, co-founder of the Church of God
