= Maysville, Wayne County, Ohio =

Unincorporated community in Ohio, U.S.

Coordinates: 40°41′50″N 81°47′33″W

Maysville is an unincorporated community in Wayne County, in the U.S. state of Ohio.

== History ==
A variant name of Maysville was Kochs. A post office called Koch's was established in 1855, the name was changed to Koch in 1893, and the post office closed in 1907. Besides the post office, Maysville had the Maysville Tile Works.
