= Golden Corners, Ohio =

Unincorporated community in Ohio, U.S.

Coordinates: 40°54′54″N 81°58′55″W

Golden Corners is an unincorporated community in Wayne County, in the U.S. state of Ohio.

== History ==
A post office called Golden Corners was established in 1854, and remained in operation until 1901. In 1910, Golden Corners was one of five communities within Canaan Township.
