= West Lebanon, Ohio =

Unincorporated community in Ohio, U.S.

Coordinates: 40°43′28″N 81°40′03″W

West Lebanon is an unincorporated community in Wayne County, in the U.S. state of Ohio.

== History ==
The first settlement at West Lebanon was made in 1808. West Lebanon was platted in 1833, and named after West Lebanon, Lebanon County, Pennsylvania, the native home of a first settler. A post office called West Lebanon was established in 1846, and remained in operation until 1907.
