= Funk, Ohio =

Unincorporated community in Ohio, U.S.

Coordinates: 40°45′11″N 82°06′59″W

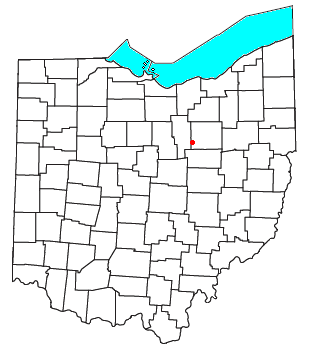
Location of Funk, Ohio

Funk is an unincorporated community in southwestern Plain Township, Wayne County, Ohio, United States. Because it is not tracked by the U.S. Census, a census population estimate is not available.

Funk is a hamlet and was platted under the name Austen in 1894. Before that, it was called Kauffman Corners. The names Kaufman, Funk, and Austen all referred to local families who had owned land in and around Funk for generations.

Funk's growth started in the late 1890s when a portion of the A&W Railroad was built from Big Prairie to Ashland. This was completed in 1899. At this point, there was another village called Austin, Ohio, so the name was changed to Funk after a local family that lived and farmed in the area.

Before World War I, a Grain elevator was built. It is assumed it was built by a man named Craig, who may be the man who donated his farmland to form Craigton, another unincorporated community and railroad depot from the early 1900s located a few miles from Funk. This grain elevator passed through several hands before becoming known as the Funk Equity Union Co. It was later owned by William "D" Funk, who also owned the successful general store and was an agent for the railroad in the village. D Funk inherited the general store from his father Zenas between 1895 and 1910. The store went through several more owners until it was finally closed in 1986. The grain elevator was operated until 1957.

Funk had two blacksmiths, a scrap dealer, a butcher, several barbers, a makeshift automobile jack factory called The Black Jack Factory, an ice house, gravel pit, and in the 1980s was home to the Austin Disposal headquarters.

The only church in Funk was a Methodist church located across the Ashland County line, the building later moved to Funk and remodeled into a home. They were destroyed in a fire in 1940. The locals transferred to Maple Grove Methodist Church.

There is some confusion for outsiders about the origins of Funk's name because they were never explicitly recorded in public records.

Funk is located at the intersection of South Funk Road and State Route 95, southwest of the county seat of Wooster.
