= Honeytown, Ohio =

Unincorporated community in Ohio, U.S.

Coordinates: 40°47′49″N 81°52′47″W

Honeytown is an unincorporated community in Wooster Township, Wayne County, in the U.S. state of Ohio. Apple Creek flows past the town site.

A post office called Honeytown was established in 1884, and closed in 1885.
