= Pleasant Home, Ohio =

Unincorporated community in Ohio, U.S.

Coordinates: 40°54′56″N 82°06′33″W

Pleasant Home is an unincorporated community in Wayne County, in the U.S. state of Ohio.

== History ==
Pleasant Home was platted at an unknown date. A post office called Pleasant Home was established in 1873, and remained in operation until 1902.
