= Centerville, Wayne County, Ohio =

Unincorporated community in Ohio, U.S.

Coordinates: 40°40′06″N 82°02′28″W

Centerville is an unincorporated community in Wayne County, in the U.S. state of Ohio.

== History ==
Centerville was platted in 1851. A former variant name was Special.
