= Springville, Wayne County, Ohio =

Unincorporated community in Ohio, U.S.

Coordinates: 40°44′10″N 82°01′58″W

Springville is an unincorporated community in Wayne County, in the U.S. state of Ohio. It lies southwest of Wooster, Ohio, and north of Shreve, Ohio.

== History ==
Springville was platted in 1844. Early variant names were Buffalo and Heath's Corners. A post office called Springville was established in 1860, and remained in operation until 1902.
