= Jefferson, Wayne County, Ohio =

Unincorporated community in Ohio, U.S.

Coordinates: 40°48′06″N 82°01′23″W

Jefferson is an unincorporated community in Wayne County, in the U.S. state of Ohio.

== History ==
Jefferson was platted on June 30, 1829, by Stephen Williams and Alexander Hutchinson. It was surveyed by George Emery. The plat and certificate recorded July 2, 1829. The community was named after Thomas Jefferson, third President of the United States. An old variant name of Jefferson was Plain.

Jefferson became popular as a business center because it was located four miles west of Wooster, the county seat. A coach line passed through Jefferson, which further helped the settlement. However, it was later vacated and Jefferson declined in popularity. A post office called Plain was established in 1833, and remained in operation until 1907.

Today, homes and businesses in Jefferson have Wooster addresses. A handful of companies operate here, or near the original settlement. These include B.W. Rogers Co, Kelly's Propane, Professional Textile Services, Central Farm & Garden Inc, and Airgas Store. Jefferson is located at the intersection of N Jefferson Rd and W Old Lincoln Way.
