= Mohican Township, Ashland County, Ohio =

Township in Ohio, US

- Township
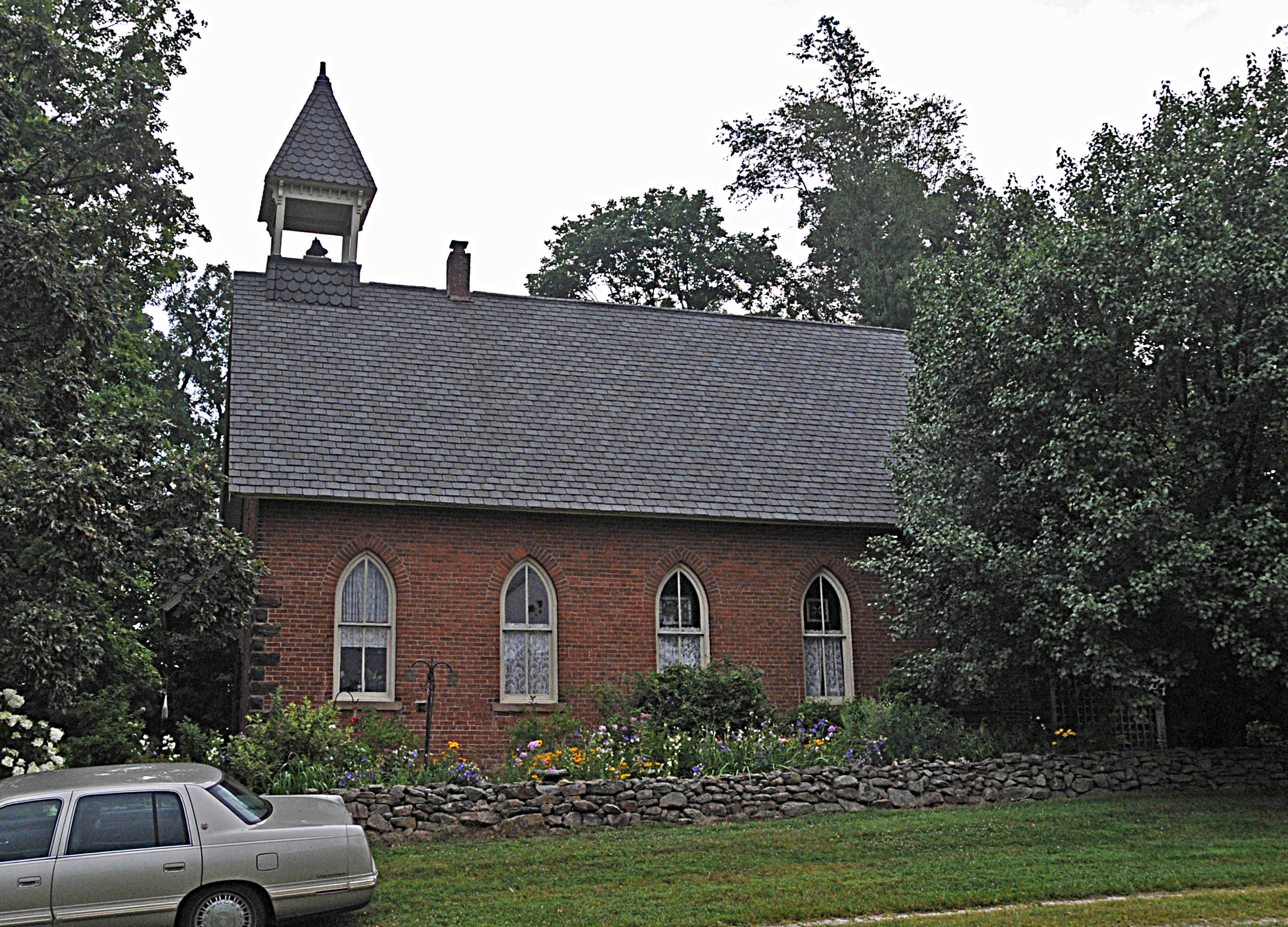
- The Lakefork Schoolhouse, built 1880

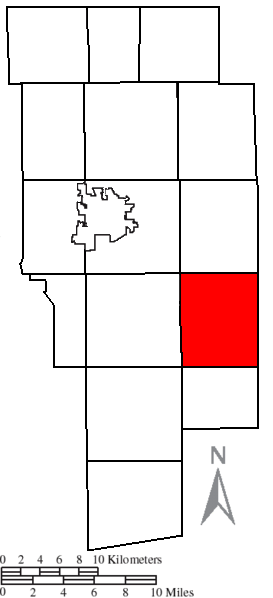
- Location of Mohican Township in Ashland County
- Coordinates: 40°47′32″N 82°11′3″W
- Country: United States
- State: Ohio
- County: Ashland

Area
  - Total: 30.1 sq mi (77.9 km^{2})
  - Land: 30.0 sq mi (77.8 km^{2})
  - Water: 0.039 sq mi (0.1 km^{2})
- Elevation: 1,096 ft (334 m)

Population (2020)
  - Total: 2,078
  - Density: 68/sq mi (26.1/km^{2})
- Time zone: UTC-5 (Eastern (EST))
  - Summer (DST): UTC-4 (EDT)
- FIPS code: 39-51086
- GNIS feature ID: 1085710

Mohican Township is one of the fifteen townships of Ashland County, Ohio, United States. The population was 2,078 at the 2020 census.

== Geography ==
Located in the southeastern part of the county, it borders the following townships:

- Perry Township - north
- Chester Township, Wayne County - northeast corner
- Plain Township, Wayne County - east
- Clinton Township, Wayne County - southeast corner
- Lake Township - south
- Green Township - southwest corner
- Vermillion Township - west
- Montgomery Township - northwest corner

The village of Jeromesville is located in northwestern Mohican Township.

== Name and history ==
Mohican Township was established in 1812. The Mahicans and other Indian tribes once lived within its borders.

It is the only Mohican Township statewide.

== Government ==
The township is governed by a three-member board of trustees, who are elected in November of odd-numbered years to a four-year term beginning on the following January 1. Two are elected in the year after the presidential election and one is elected in the year before it. There is also an elected township fiscal officer, who serves a four-year term beginning on April 1 of the year after the election, which is held in November of the year before the presidential election. Vacancies in the fiscal officership or on the board of trustees are filled by the remaining trustees.
