= Wooster Township, Ohio =

Township in Ohio, US

- Township
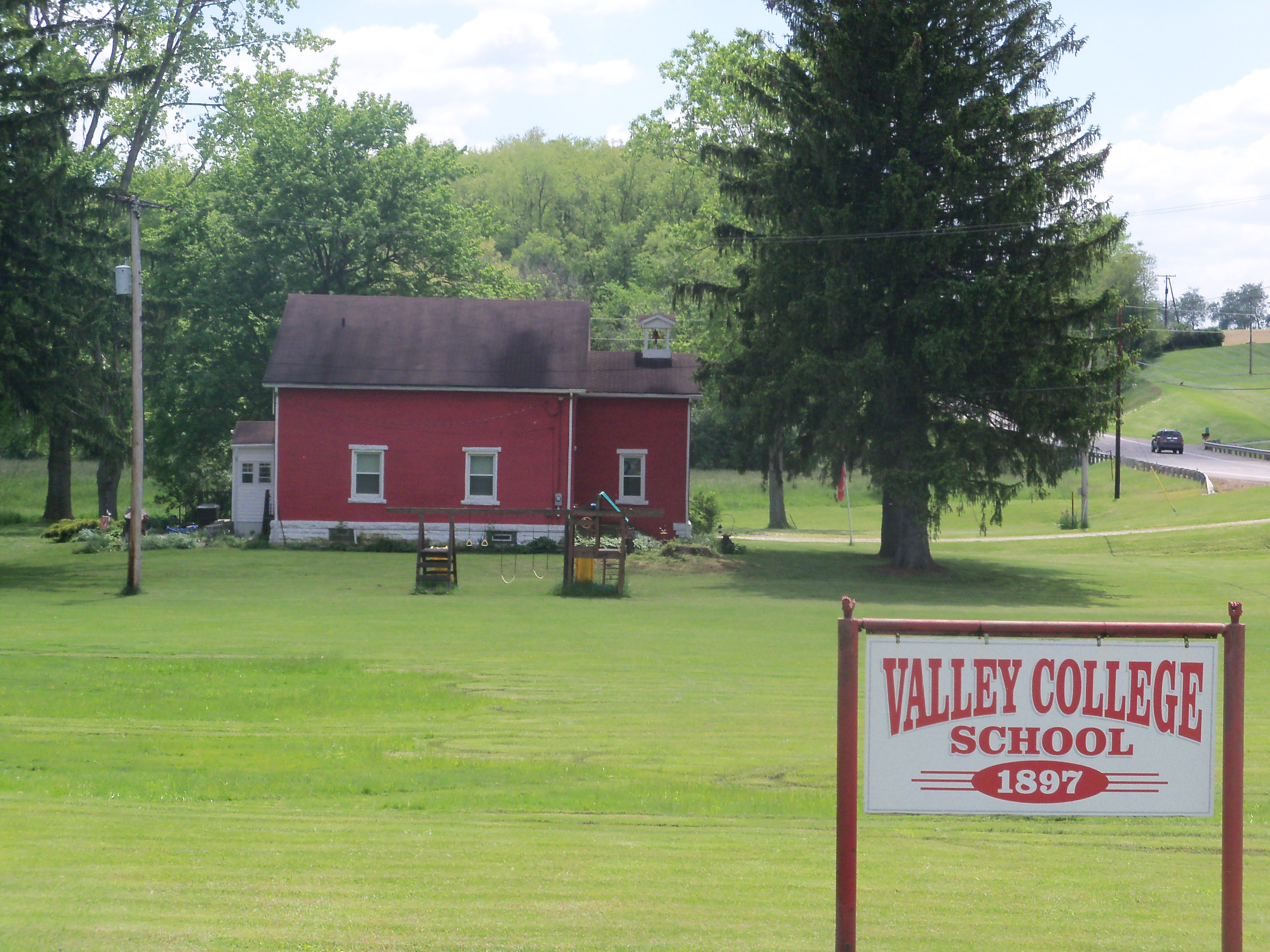
- This old schoolhouse is on Route 226

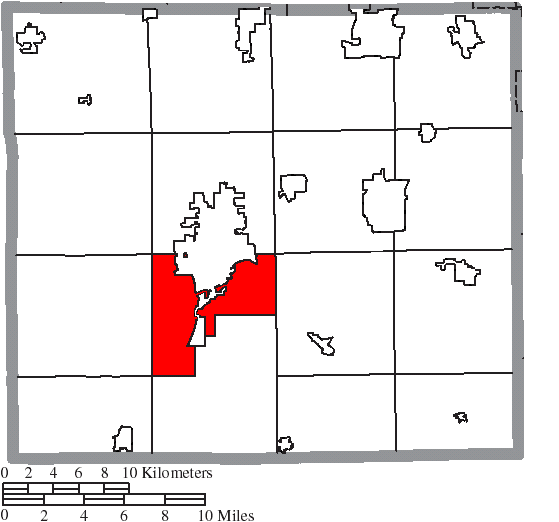
- Location of Wooster Township in Wayne County
- Coordinates: 40°46′53″N 81°56′34″W
- Country: United States
- State: Ohio
- County: Wayne

Area
  - Total: 20.3 sq mi (52.7 km^{2})
  - Land: 20.3 sq mi (52.5 km^{2})
  - Water: 0.077 sq mi (0.2 km^{2})
- Elevation: 850 ft (259 m)

Population (2020)
  - Total: 4,615
  - Density: 228/sq mi (87.9/km^{2})
- Time zone: UTC-5 (Eastern (EST))
  - Summer (DST): UTC-4 (EDT)
- ZIP code: 44691
- Area code: 330
- FIPS code: 39-86562
- GNIS feature ID: 1087164
- Website: https://woostertwptrustees.com/

Wooster Township is one of the sixteen townships of Wayne County, Ohio, United States. The 2020 census found 4,615 people in the township.

== Geography ==
Located in the central part of the county, it borders the following townships:

- Wayne Township - north
- Green Township - northeast corner
- East Union Township - east
- Franklin Township - south
- Clinton Township - southwest corner
- Plain Township - west
- Chester Township - northwest corner

The unincorporated communities of Honeytown, Westwood (not to be confused with the Westwood neighborhood of the city of Cincinnati), Burnetts Corners, and Hillcrest (not to be confused with the unincorporated community of the same name in Warren County) are located in the township.

Much of Wooster Township is occupied by the city of Wooster, the county seat of Wayne County.

== Name and history ==
It is the only Wooster Township statewide.

== Government ==
The township is governed by a three-member board of trustees, who are elected in November of odd-numbered years to a four-year term beginning on the following January 1. Two are elected in the year after the presidential election and one is elected in the year before it. There is also an elected township fiscal officer, who serves a four-year term beginning on April 1 of the year after the election, which is held in November of the year before the presidential election. Vacancies in the fiscal officership or on the board of trustees are filled by the remaining trustees.
