= Johnsons Corners, Ohio =

Unincorporated community in Ohio, U.S.

Coordinates: 40°57′38″N 81°50′30″W

Johnsons Corners is an unincorporated community in Wayne County, in the U.S. state of Ohio.

== History ==
Johnsons Corners was named for Abner Johnson, the original owner of the town site. A variant name was Amwell. A post office called Amwell was established in 1861, and remained in operation until 1883.
