= Millbrook, Ohio =

Unincorporated community in Ohio, U.S.

Coordinates: 40°43′38″N 82°0′30″W

Millbrook is an unincorporated community in Wayne County, in the U.S. state of Ohio.

== History ==
Millbrook was platted in 1829. A post office called Mill Brook was established in 1829, and remained in operation until 1902.
