= New Pittsburg, Ohio =

- CDP
- Interactive map of New Pittsburg, Ohio
- Coordinates: 40°50′30″N 82°05′56″W
- Country: United States
- State: Ohio
- County: Wayne
- Elevation: 1,161 ft (354 m)

Population (2020)
  - Total: 303
- Time zone: UTC-5 (Eastern (EST))
  - Summer (DST): UTC-4 (EDT)
- GNIS feature ID: 2628943

New Pittsburg is a census-designated place in Wayne County, in the U.S. state of Ohio. It lies northwest of Wooster, Ohio, along U.S. Route 250. The population was 303 at the 2020 census.

== History ==
New Pittsburg was laid out in 1829. A post office called New Pittsburgh was established in 1835, the name was changed to New Pittsburg in 1892, and the post office closed in 1907.
