= Wayne County, Ohio =

County in Ohio, United States

- County
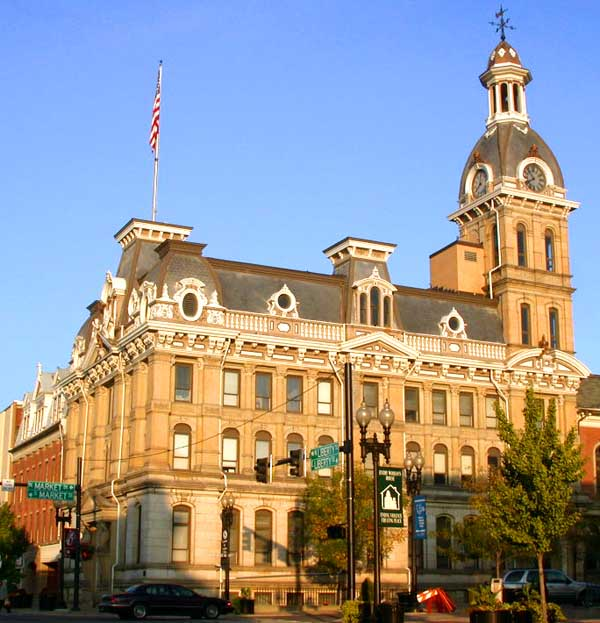
- Wayne County Courthouse

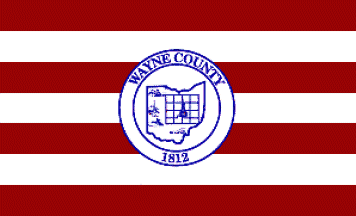
- Flag Seal

- Location within the U.S. state of Ohio
- Coordinates: 40°50′N 81°53′W
- Country: United States
- State: Ohio
- Founded: January 4, 1812 (date organized; formed 1808)
- Named for: General Anthony Wayne
- Seat: Wooster
- Largest city: Wooster

Area
  - Total: 557 sq mi (1,440 km^{2})
  - Land: 555 sq mi (1,440 km^{2})
  - Water: 1.9 sq mi (4.9 km^{2}) 0.3%

Population (2020)
  - Total: 116,894
  - Estimate (2025): 116,758 ▼
  - Density: 210/sq mi (81/km^{2})
- Time zone: UTC−5 (Eastern)
  - Summer (DST): UTC−4 (EDT)
- Congressional district: 7th
- Website: www.wayneohio.org

Wayne County is a county located in the northeastern quadrant of the U.S. state of Ohio. As of the 2020 census, the population was 116,894. Its county seat is Wooster. The county is named for General "Mad" Anthony Wayne. Wayne County comprises the Wooster, OH Micropolitan Statistical Area.

== History ==
Wayne County as it exists today was described in legislation in 1808 but was not formally organized until January 1812, with effect from March 1. An earlier Wayne County, created by the government of the Northwest Territory in 1796, included much of northern Ohio and all of the lower peninsula of Michigan. That Wayne County is now part of Michigan.

== Geography ==
According to the U.S. Census Bureau, the county has a total area of 557 square miles (1,440 km^{2}), of which 555 square miles (1,440 km^{2}) is land and 1.9 square miles (4.9 km^{2}) (0.3%) is water.

=== Adjacent counties ===
- Medina County (north)
- Summit County (northeast)
- Stark County (east)
- Holmes County (south)
- Ashland County (west)

== Demographics ==
Historical population
Census	Pop.	Note	%±
1820	11,933		—
1830	23,333		95.5%
1840	35,808		53.5%
1850	32,981		−7.9%
1860	32,483		−1.5%
1870	35,116		8.1%
1880	40,076		14.1%
1890	39,005		−2.7%
1900	37,870		−2.9%
1910	38,058		0.5%
1920	41,346		8.6%
1930	47,024		13.7%
1940	50,520		7.4%
1950	58,716		16.2%
1960	75,497		28.6%
1970	87,123		15.4%
1980	97,408		11.8%
1990	101,461		4.2%
2000	111,564		10.0%
2010	114,520		2.6%
2020	116,894		2.1%
2025 (est.)	116,758	▼	−0.1%
U.S. Decennial Census:

=== 2020 census ===
As of the 2020 census, the county had a population of 116,894. The median age was 39.0 years; 24.0% of residents were under the age of 18 and 18.6% were 65 years of age or older. For every 100 females there were 98.3 males, and for every 100 females age 18 and over there were 95.5 males age 18 and over.

The racial makeup of the county was 92.2% White, 1.5% Black or African American, 0.2% American Indian and Alaska Native, 0.8% Asian, <0.1% Native Hawaiian and Pacific Islander, 1.0% from some other race, and 4.3% from two or more races. Hispanic or Latino residents of any race comprised 2.4% of the population.

44.2% of residents lived in urban areas, while 55.8% lived in rural areas.

There were 43,983 households in the county, of which 29.3% had children under the age of 18 living in them. Of all households, 53.9% were married-couple households, 17.1% were households with a male householder and no spouse or partner present, and 22.9% were households with a female householder and no spouse or partner present. About 27.0% of all households were made up of individuals and 12.3% had someone living alone who was 65 years of age or older. There were 46,555 housing units, of which 5.5% were vacant. Among occupied housing units, 72.3% were owner-occupied and 27.7% were renter-occupied. The homeowner vacancy rate was 0.9% and the rental vacancy rate was 5.9%.

=== Racial and ethnic composition ===
Wayne County, Ohio – Racial and ethnic composition Note: the US Census treats Hispanic/Latino as an ethnic category. This table excludes Latinos from the racial categories and assigns them to a separate category. Hispanics/Latinos may be of any race.
Race / Ethnicity (NH = Non-Hispanic)	Pop 1980	Pop 1990	Pop 2000	Pop 2010	Pop 2020	% 1980	% 1990	% 2000	% 2010	% 2020
White alone (NH)	95,207	98,804	107,151	108,450	106,930	97.74%	97.38%	96.04%	94.70%	91.48%
Black or African American alone (NH)	1,230	1,547	1,723	1,689	1,755	1.26%	1.52%	1.54%	1.47%	1.50%
Native American or Alaska Native alone (NH)	62	125	164	152	142	0.06%	0.12%	0.15%	0.13%	0.12%
Asian alone (NH)	243	526	732	864	950	0.25%	0.52%	0.66%	0.75%	0.81%
Native Hawaiian or Pacific Islander alone (NH)	x	x	13	22	32	x	x	0.01%	0.02%	0.03%
Other race alone (NH)	192	30	78	106	283	0.20%	0.03%	0.07%	0.09%	0.24%
Mixed race or Multiracial (NH)	x	x	866	1,437	4,047	x	x	0.78%	1.25%	3.46%
Hispanic or Latino (any race)	474	429	837	1,800	2,755	0.49%	0.42%	0.75%	1.57%	2.36%
Total	97,408	101,461	111,564	114,520	116,894	100.00%	100.00%	100.00%	100.00%	100.00%

=== 2010 census ===
As of the 2010 United States census, there were 114,520 people, 42,638 households, and 30,070 families living in the county. The population density was 206.4 inhabitants per square mile (79.7 inhabitants/km^{2}). There were 45,847 housing units at an average density of 82.6 units per square mile (31.9 units/km^{2}). The racial makeup of the county was 95.7% white, 1.5% black or African American, 0.8% Asian, 0.2% American Indian, 0.5% from other races, and 1.4% from two or more races. Those of Hispanic or Latino origin made up 1.6% of the population. In terms of ancestry, 34.1% were German, 13.3% were American, 12.9% were Irish, and 9.0% were English.

Of the 42,638 households, 32.5% had children under the age of 18 living with them, 57.1% were married couples living together, 9.2% had a female householder with no husband present, 29.5% were non-families, and 25.1% of all households were made up of individuals. The average household size was 2.61 and the average family size was 3.13. The median age was 38.3 years.

The median income for a household in the county was $48,375 and the median income for a family was $59,692. Males had a median income of $42,082 versus $29,623 for females. The per capita income for the county was $22,645. About 7.8% of families and 9.9% of the population were below the poverty line, including 14.9% of those under age 18 and 6.3% of those age 65 or over.

=== 2000 census ===
As of the census of 2000, there were 111,564 people, 40,445 households, and 29,484 families living in the county. The population density was 201 inhabitants per square mile (78 inhabitants/km^{2}). There were 42,324 housing units at an average density of 76 units per square mile (29/km^{2}). The racial makeup of the county was 96.52% White, 1.57% Black or African American, 0.16% Native American, 0.66% Asian, 0.01% Pacific Islander, 0.24% from other races, and 0.84% from two or more races. 0.75% of the population were Hispanic or Latino of any race. 31.7% were of German, 13.9% American, 9.6% Irish, 9.0% English and 5.5% Swiss ancestry according to Census 2000. 91.5% spoke English, 3.2% German, 1.6% Dutch, 1.5% Pennsylvania Dutch and 1.2% Spanish as their first language.

There were 40,445 households, out of which 35.00% had children under the age of 18 living with them, 60.80% were married couples living together, 8.70% had a female householder with no husband present, and 27.10% were non-families. 22.70% of all households were made up of individuals, and 8.70% had someone living alone who was 65 years of age or older. The average household size was 2.68 and the average family size was 3.17.

In the county, the population was spread out, with 27.40% under the age of 18, 9.80% from 18 to 24, 27.80% from 25 to 44, 22.70% from 45 to 64, and 12.20% who were 65 years of age or older. The median age was 35 years. For every 100 females there were 97.50 males. For every 100 females age 18 and over, there were 94.50 males.

The median income for a household in the county was $41,538, and the median income for a family was $48,294. Males had a median income of $33,976 versus $23,203 for females. The per capita income for the county was $18,330. About 5.40% of families and 8.00% of the population were below the poverty line, including 10.60% of those under age 18 and 6.90% of those age 65 or over.

=== Ancestry ===
There were several large waves of migration into what it is today Wayne County, Ohio. The first wave was groups of families from New England, migrating westward into what was then the Northwest Territory and then early statehood era Ohio between the 1790s and the 1820s. Most of the settlers who arrived in what would become Wayne County at that time were from New England. They were overwhelmingly Congregationalists, however, in the 1810s several arrived who had become Methodists, Baptists and Presbyterians during the Second Great Awakening. These groups were of English ancestry, being descended from the English Puritans who arrived in colonial New England during the 1620s and 1630s. The English-descended "Yankee" New Englanders established the county in 1812. The second large migration was German immigrants, the Germans settled in Wayne County in large numbers between the 1820s and the 1880s, forming a steady stream of migration into the county during that time. These immigrants were almost exclusively Lutheran. Lastly in the early 1850s a large group of Irish immigrants arrived in the county as part of a large wave of migration entering the United States at that time. This group was overwhelmingly Catholic. Many families currently in Wayne County go back to the early 19th century settlement of the county by New Englanders. Today, many of these same people who cite that they are of "American" ancestry are actually of English descent, however, they have families that have been in the state so long, in many cases since the colonial period, that they choose to identify simply as having "American" ancestry or do not, in fact, know their own ancestry. Their ancestry primarily goes back to the original Thirteen Colonies and for this reason many of them today simply claim "American" ancestry, though they are of predominantly English ancestry. There are also many Irish-Americans in the county. German-Americans have formed the largest single group in Wayne County since the late 1800s.

== Politics ==
Prior to 1912, Wayne County was a Democratic stronghold in presidential elections, only voting Republicans twice since 1856. It was a bellwether from 1912 to 1936, but starting with the 1940 election, the county has become a Republican stronghold with Lyndon B. Johnson in 1964 being the last Democrat to win the county.

United States presidential election results for Wayne County, Ohio
Year	Republican		Democratic		Third party(ies)	
Year	No.	%	No.	%	No.	%
1856	2,904	49.48%	2,918	49.72%	47	0.80%
1860	3,204	48.73%	3,250	49.43%	121	1.84%
1864	3,155	48.13%	3,400	51.87%	0	0.00%
1868	3,557	48.24%	3,816	51.76%	0	0.00%
1872	3,768	51.53%	3,533	48.32%	11	0.15%
1876	4,009	46.40%	4,598	53.21%	34	0.39%
1880	4,424	47.68%	4,819	51.94%	35	0.38%
1884	4,497	47.05%	4,818	50.41%	242	2.53%
1888	4,161	43.77%	4,888	51.41%	458	4.82%
1892	3,752	41.51%	4,702	52.02%	585	6.47%
1896	4,369	43.09%	5,588	55.11%	182	1.80%
1900	4,244	43.11%	5,263	53.46%	338	3.43%
1904	4,748	50.80%	4,165	44.56%	433	4.63%
1908	4,388	43.51%	5,368	53.23%	328	3.25%
1912	1,674	18.07%	4,737	51.14%	2,852	30.79%
1916	3,676	37.33%	5,930	60.22%	241	2.45%
1920	8,932	52.88%	7,751	45.89%	207	1.23%
1924	8,928	53.80%	6,023	36.30%	1,643	9.90%
1928	14,192	74.60%	4,825	25.36%	7	0.04%
1932	10,787	48.82%	10,870	49.19%	440	1.99%
1936	10,331	44.11%	12,666	54.08%	426	1.82%
1940	13,525	55.72%	10,748	44.28%	0	0.00%
1944	13,616	58.89%	9,506	41.11%	0	0.00%
1948	12,152	57.62%	8,868	42.05%	70	0.33%
1952	18,074	68.23%	8,414	31.77%	0	0.00%
1956	19,469	73.60%	6,984	26.40%	0	0.00%
1960	21,273	69.10%	9,511	30.90%	0	0.00%
1964	9,890	40.05%	14,806	59.95%	0	0.00%
1968	15,151	58.34%	8,891	34.24%	1,928	7.42%
1972	20,368	67.72%	9,260	30.79%	448	1.49%
1976	16,976	55.20%	13,087	42.55%	691	2.25%
1980	18,962	55.87%	12,129	35.73%	2,851	8.40%
1984	24,475	67.79%	11,323	31.36%	305	0.84%
1988	22,320	61.64%	13,571	37.48%	317	0.88%
1992	18,350	43.71%	13,953	33.24%	9,679	23.06%
1996	19,628	48.41%	14,850	36.62%	6,070	14.97%
2000	25,901	61.04%	14,779	34.83%	1,756	4.14%
2004	31,879	61.49%	19,786	38.16%	183	0.35%
2008	29,342	56.13%	21,712	41.53%	1,222	2.34%
2012	30,251	59.12%	19,808	38.71%	1,106	2.16%
2016	32,270	64.26%	15,031	29.93%	2,916	5.81%
2020	36,759	67.72%	16,660	30.69%	864	1.59%
2024	36,764	69.17%	15,898	29.91%	488	0.92%

== Government ==
The Wayne County Public Library serves the communities of Wayne County, Ohio from its administrative offices in Wooster, Ohio and branches in Creston, Dalton, Doylestown, Rittman, Shreve, and West Salem. It also offers bookmobile service and outreach program, and patron can use the extended services of CLEVNET, a group of libraries located in northeast Ohio.

In 2005, the library lent more than 1.2 million items to its 54,000 cardholders. Total holding are over 340,000 volumes with over 900 periodical subscriptions.

== Education ==
- Central Christian High School
- Chippewa High School
- Dalton High School
- Kingsway Christian School
- Northwestern High School
- Norwayne High School
- Orrville High School
- Rittman High School
- Smithville High School
- Triway High School
- Waynedale High School
- Wooster High School

The College of Wooster is also located in Wayne County.

== Transportation ==
The Wayne County Airport is located six nautical miles (6.9 mi; 11 km) northeast of Wooster's central business district.

== Communities ==
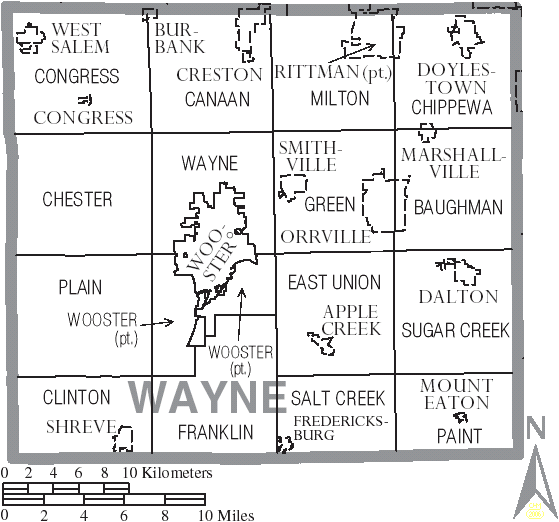
Map of Wayne County, Ohio with municipal and township labels

=== Cities ===
- Orrville
- Rittman
- Wooster (county seat)
- Norton (mostly in Summit County)

=== Villages ===
- Apple Creek
- Burbank
- Congress
- Creston
- Dalton
- Doylestown
- Fredericksburg
- Marshallville
- Mount Eaton
- Shreve
- Smithville
- West Salem

=== Townships ===
- Baughman
- Canaan
- Chester
- Chippewa
- Clinton
- Congress
- East Union
- Franklin
- Green
- Milton
- Paint
- Plain
- Salt Creek
- Sugar Creek
- Wayne
- Wooster

=== Census-designated places ===
- Kidron
- New Pittsburg
- Sterling

=== Unincorporated communities ===
- Blachleyville
- Burnetts Corners
- Burton City
- Cedar Valley
- Centerville
- Devil Town
- East Union
- Easton
- Funk
- Golden Corners
- Guerne
- Hillcrest
- Honeytown
- Jefferson
- Johnsons Corners
- Lattasburg
- Maysville
- Mechanicsburg
- Millbrook
- Moreland
- Overton
- Pleasant Home
- Reedsburg
- Riceland
- Springville
- West Lebanon
- Westwood
- Weilersville

== See also ==
- Death on a Factory Farm
- National Register of Historic Places listings in Wayne County, Ohio
