= Reedsburg, Ohio =

Unincorporated community in Wayne County, Ohio

Coordinates: 40°48′31″N 82°06′25″W

Reedsburg is an unincorporated community in Wayne County, in the U.S. state of Ohio.

== History ==
Reedsburg was laid out in 1835 by William Reed, and named for him. A post office called Reedsburg was established in 1893, and remained in operation until 1907.
