= Blachleyville, Ohio =

Unincorporated community in Ohio, U.S.

Coordinates: 40°45′52″N 82°04′56″W

Blachleyville is an unincorporated community in Wayne County, in the U.S. state of Ohio.

== History ==
Blachleyville was laid out on December 16, 1833, by Drs. William Boyd Blachley Sr and Jr, and named for Blachley Sr. It was surveyed by George Emery. The plat and certificate recorded March 1834. Blachley was born in New Jersey, lived in Pennsylvania for most of his childhood, and came to Plain Township in 1816. He was a physician who practiced medicine in the area for nineteen years and had nineteen children.

The first settlers of Plain Township settled near Blachleyville. The first were John Collier and wife Sarah Eylar. Others were William Meeks, Cyrus Baird, and George and David Lozier. Daniel Miller is credited with building the sawmill in 1815 and the first house in Blachleyville. John Cassiday was the first school teacher, and Elder French was the first minister (Baptist).

A post office called Blackleysville was established in 1830, the name was changed to Blackleyville in 1884, and the post office closed in 1907.
