= Chester Township, Wayne County, Ohio =

Township in Ohio, US

- Township
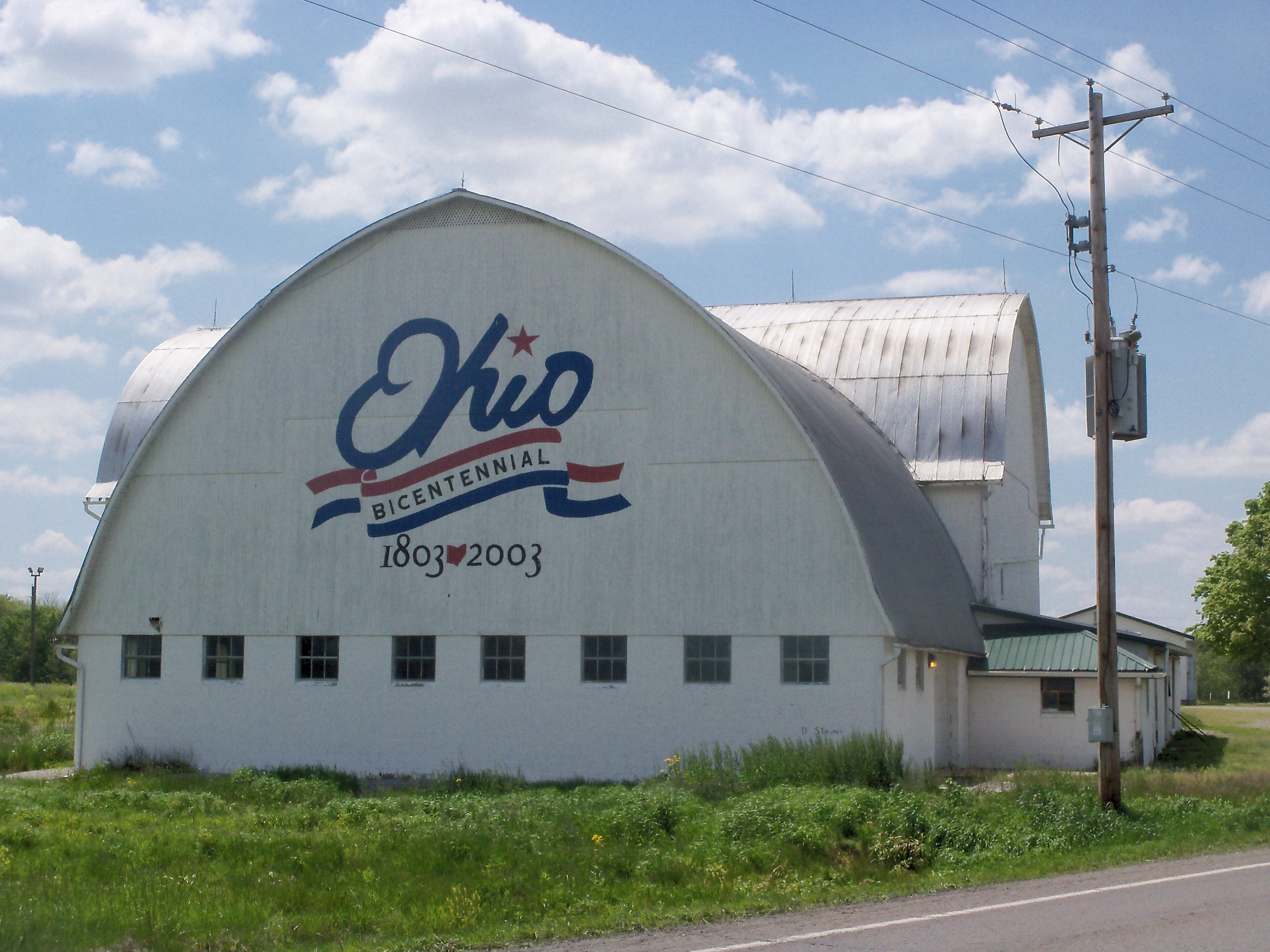
- Bicentennial barn on U.S. Route 250

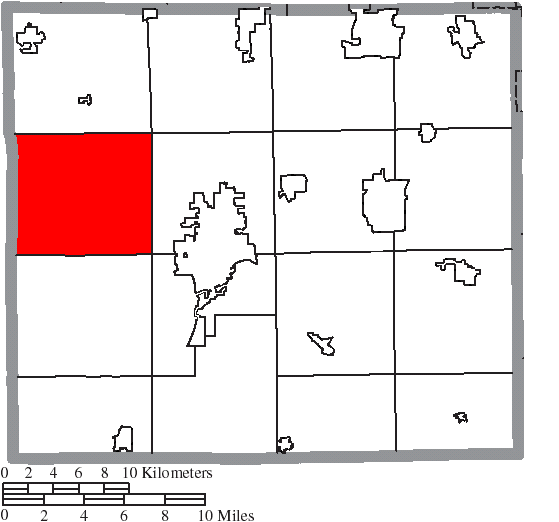
- Location of Chester Township in Wayne County
- Coordinates: 40°51′40″N 82°2′57″W
- Country: United States
- State: Ohio
- County: Wayne

Area
  - Total: 41.7 sq mi (108.0 km^{2})
  - Land: 41.7 sq mi (107.9 km^{2})
  - Water: 0.039 sq mi (0.1 km^{2})
- Elevation: 1,142 ft (348 m)

Population (2020)
  - Total: 3,043
  - Density: 73/sq mi (28.2/km^{2})
- Time zone: UTC-5 (Eastern (EST))
  - Summer (DST): UTC-4 (EDT)
- FIPS code: 39-14044
- GNIS feature ID: 1087150

Chester Township is one of the sixteen townships of Wayne County, Ohio, United States. The 2020 census found 3,043 people in the township.

== Geography ==
Located in the western part of the county, it borders the following townships:

- Congress Township - north
- Canaan Township - northeast corner
- Wayne Township - east
- Wooster Township - southeast corner
- Plain Township - south
- Mohican Township, Ashland County - southwest corner
- Perry Township, Ashland County - west
- Jackson Township, Ashland County - northwest corner

No municipalities are located in Chester Township.

== Name and history ==
It is one of five Chester Townships statewide.

== Government ==
The township is governed by a three-member board of trustees, who are elected in November of odd-numbered years to a four-year term beginning on the following January 1. Two are elected in the year after the presidential election and one is elected in the year before it. There is also an elected township fiscal officer, who serves a four-year term beginning on April 1 of the year after the election, which is held in November of the year before the presidential election. Vacancies in the fiscal officership or on the board of trustees are filled by the remaining trustees.
