= Devil Town, Ohio =

Devil Town
- Unincorporated community
- Location within Ohio Location within the United States
- Coordinates: 40°50′43″N 81°58′25″W
- Country: United States
- State: Ohio
- County: Wayne
- Elevation: 1,034 ft (315 m)
- Time zone: UTC-5 (Eastern (EST))
  - Summer (DST): UTC-4 (EDT)
- GNIS feature ID: 1048658

Devil Town is an unincorporated community in Wayne County, Ohio, United States. Devil Town is located approximately 5 mi (8.0 km) northwest of Wooster. Clear Creek flows through the community.

Land was first sold in the area in 1830. The community was called "Tannersville" because a tannery was established there. There was also a blacksmith shop, grocery store, saloon, post office, and mill.

Tannersville later became known as "Devil Town". One explanation is that a resident there frequently used the word "Devil" when speaking. Another explanation is that the residents—seeking relief from the stench of the tannery—were frequently intoxicated and were "real Devils".

Mechanicsburg Road runs through Devil Town, and some homes are located there. Little remains of the original community.
