= Creston, Ohio =

- Village
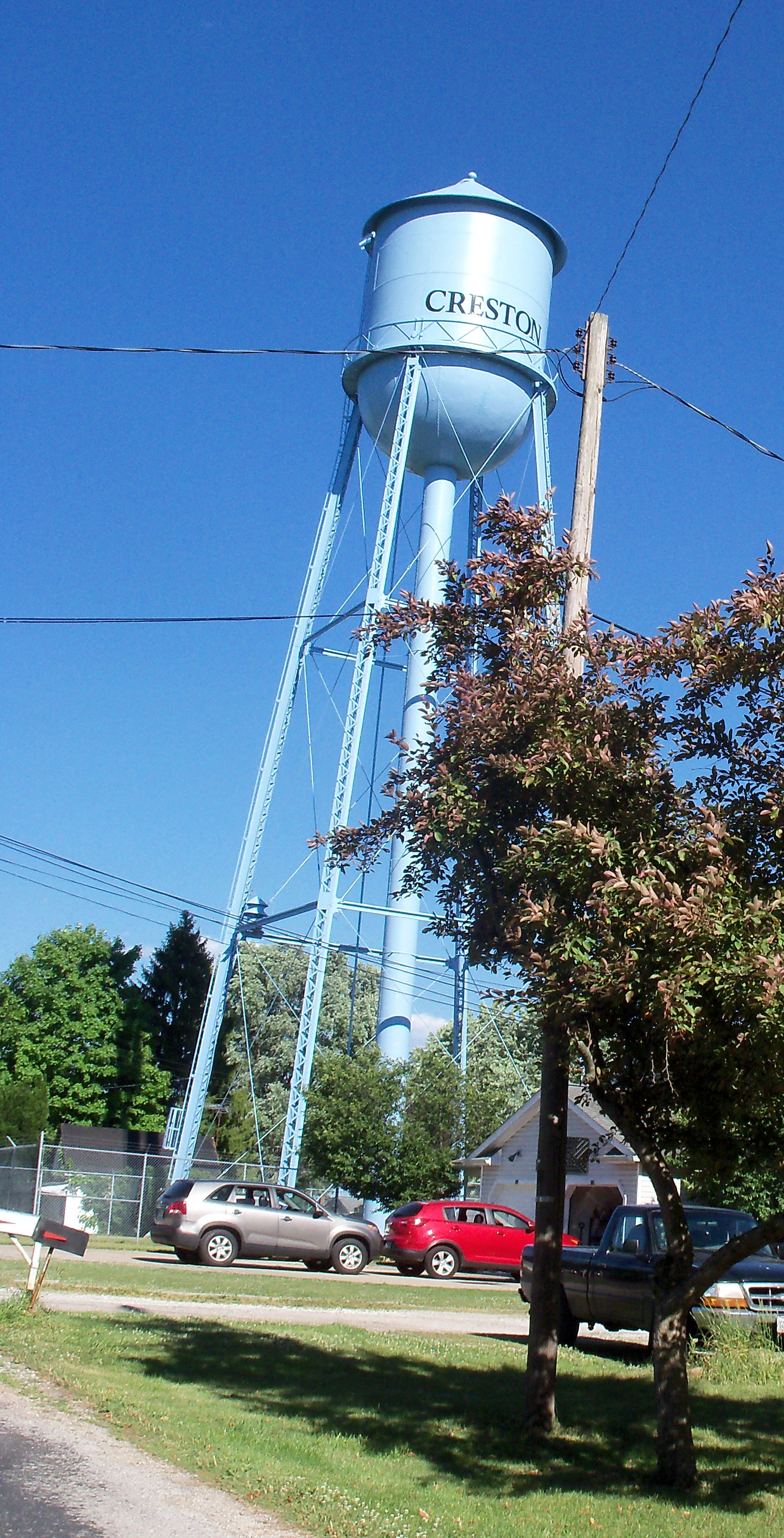
- Creston water tower

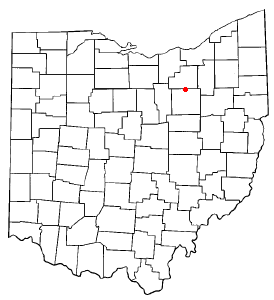
- Location of Creston, Ohio

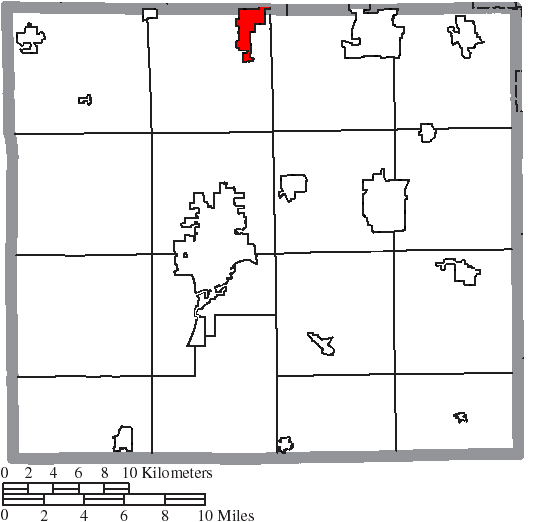
- Location of Creston in Wayne County
- Coordinates: 40°58′36″N 81°54′00″W
- Country: United States
- State: Ohio
- Counties: Wayne, Medina

Area
  - Total: 2.19 sq mi (5.67 km^{2})
  - Land: 2.19 sq mi (5.67 km^{2})
  - Water: 0 sq mi (0.00 km^{2})
- Elevation: 991 ft (302 m)

Population (2020)
  - Total: 2,139
  - Estimate (2023): 2,138
  - Density: 977/sq mi (377.3/km^{2})
- Time zone: UTC-5 (Eastern (EST))
  - Summer (DST): UTC-4 (EDT)
- ZIP code: 44217
- Area code: 330
- FIPS code: 39-19344
- GNIS feature ID: 2398646
- Website: www.crestonvillage.org

Creston is a village in Medina and Wayne counties in the U.S. state of Ohio. The population was 2,139 at the 2020 census.

== History ==
Creston had its start in the 1860s when the railroad was extended to that point . An old variant name was Pike Station. A post office called Pike Station was established in 1865, and the name was changed to Creston in 1881.

== Geography ==
According to the United States Census Bureau, the village has a total area of 2.26 square miles (5.85 km^{2}), all land.

== Demographics ==
Historical population
Census	Pop.	Note	%±
1890	584		—
1900	893		52.9%
1910	970		8.6%
1920	894		−7.8%
1930	1,029		15.1%
1940	1,110		7.9%
1950	1,300		17.1%
1960	1,522		17.1%
1970	1,792		17.7%
1980	1,828		2.0%
1990	1,848		1.1%
2000	2,161		16.9%
2010	2,171		0.5%
2020	2,139		−1.5%
2023 (est.)	2,138	▼	0.0%
U.S. Decennial Census

=== 2010 census ===
As of the census of 2010, there were 2,171 people, 865 households, and 617 families living in the village. The population density was 960.6 inhabitants per square mile (370.9/km^{2}). There were 921 housing units at an average density of 407.5 per square mile (157.3/km^{2}). The racial makeup of the village was 96.9% White, 0.4% African American, 0.1% Native American, 0.7% Asian, 0.1% from other races, and 1.8% from two or more races. Hispanic or Latino of any race were 1.0% of the population.

There were 865 households, of which 33.9% had children under the age of 18 living with them, 56.2% were married couples living together, 11.0% had a female householder with no husband present, 4.2% had a male householder with no wife present, and 28.7% were non-families. 25.0% of all households were made up of individuals, and 13.3% had someone living alone who was 65 years of age or older. The average household size was 2.51 and the average family size was 3.01.

The median age in the village was 40.2 years. 24.5% of residents were under the age of 18; 7.4% were between the ages of 18 and 24; 25.3% were from 25 to 44; 25.7% were from 45 to 64; and 17% were 65 years of age or older. The gender makeup of the village was 48.0% male and 52.0% female.

=== 2000 census ===
As of the census of 2000, there were 2,161 people, 828 households, and 630 families living in the village. The population density was 979.1 inhabitants per square mile (378.0/km^{2}). There were 884 housing units at an average density of 400.5 per square mile (154.6/km^{2}). The racial makeup of the village was 98.75% White, 0.28% African American, 0.05% Native American, 0.05% Asian, and 0.88% from two or more races. Hispanic or Latino of any race were 0.19% of the population.

There were 828 households, out of which 33.5% had children under the age of 18 living with them, 63.6% were married couples living together, 9.4% had a female householder with no husband present, and 23.8% were non-families. 20.4% of all households were made up of individuals, and 10.0% had someone living alone who was 65 years of age or older. The average household size was 2.61 and the average family size was 3.00.

In the village, the population was spread out, with 25.8% under the age of 18, 7.3% from 18 to 24, 31.8% from 25 to 44, 21.5% from 45 to 64, and 13.5% who were 65 years of age or older. The median age was 36 years. For every 100 females there were 100.8 males. For every 100 females age 18 and over, there were 97.7 males.

The median income for a household in the village was $39,821, and the median income for a family was $44,286. Males had a median income of $35,065 versus $21,023 for females. The per capita income for the village was $16,462. About 1.8% of families and 4.9% of the population were below the poverty line, including 2.8% of those under age 18 and 9.1% of those age 65 or over.

== Education ==
Norwayne High School is a public high school located on South Main Street that educates around 450 students.

Creston is served by a branch of the Wayne County Public Library.
