= Dalton, Ohio =

- Village
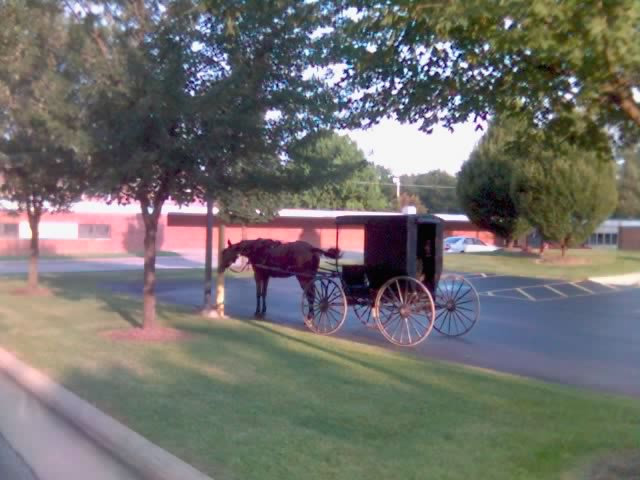
- Amish buggy in the library parking lot

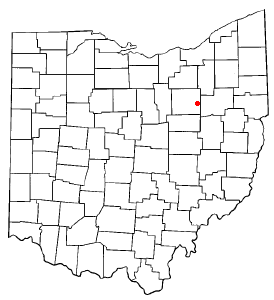
- Location of Dalton, Ohio

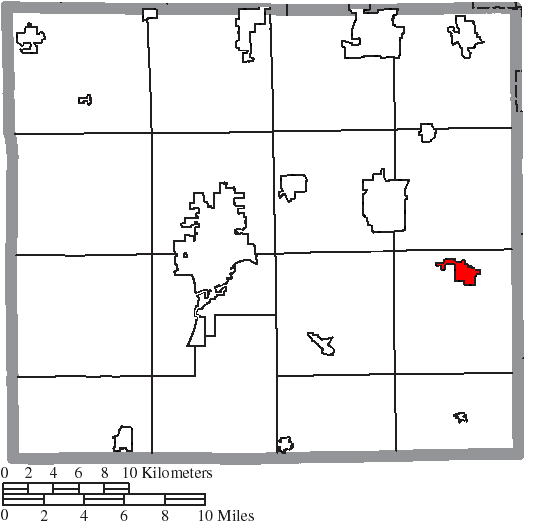
- Location of Dalton in Wayne County
- Coordinates: 40°47′58″N 81°42′13″W
- Country: United States
- State: Ohio
- County: Wayne

Government
  - Mayor: Pat Sword

Area
  - Total: 1.67 sq mi (4.33 km^{2})
  - Land: 1.67 sq mi (4.33 km^{2})
  - Water: 0 sq mi (0.00 km^{2})
- Elevation: 1,181 ft (360 m)

Population (2020)
  - Total: 1,927
  - Estimate (2023): 1,924
  - Density: 1,152.3/sq mi (444.92/km^{2})
- Demonym: Daltonian
- Time zone: UTC−5 (Eastern (EST))
  - Summer (DST): UTC−4 (EDT)
- ZIP Code: 44618
- Area code: 330
- FIPS code: 39-19974
- GNIS feature ID: 2398671
- Website: www.villageofdalton.us

Dalton is a village in Wayne County, Ohio, United States. The 2020 census indicated a population of 1,927.

== History ==
Dalton had its start in 1855 with the merging of three neighboring rival villages in Sugar Creek Township named Dover (est. 1817), Middletown (est. 1828), and Sharon (est. c. 1817–28).

== Geography ==
According to the United States Census Bureau, the village has a total area of 1.51 square miles (3.91 km^{2}), all of it land.

== Demographics ==
Historical population
Census	Pop.	Note	%±
1870	412		—
1880	486		18.0%
1890	610		25.5%
1900	666		9.2%
1910	599		−10.1%
1920	611		2.0%
1930	656		7.4%
1940	774		18.0%
1950	938		21.2%
1960	1,067		13.8%
1970	1,177		10.3%
1980	1,357		15.3%
1990	1,377		1.5%
2000	1,605		16.6%
2010	1,830		14.0%
2020	1,927		5.3%
2023 (est.)	1,924	▼	−0.2%
U.S. Decennial Census

As of the census of 2000, there were 1,605 people, 605 households, and 456 families living in the village. The population density was 1,313.9 people per square mile (507.9 per square kilometer). There were 628 housing units at an average density of 514.1 per square mile (198.7 per square kilometer). The racial makeup of the village was 98.32% White, 0.12% African American, 0.31% Native American, 0.31% Asian, 0.37% from other races, and 0.56% from two or more races. Hispanic or Latino of any race were 1.31% of the population.

There were 605 households, out of which 38.0% had children under the age of 18 living with them, 62.8% were married couples living together, 10.1% had a female householder with no husband present, and 24.5% were non-families. Of all households, 21.2% were made up of individuals, and 8.3% had someone living alone who was 65 years of age or older. The average household size was 2.65 and the average family size was 3.09.

In the village, the population was spread out, with 29.0% under the age of 18, 7.4% from 18 to 24, 31.5% from 25 to 44, 21.7% from 45 to 64, and 10.3% who were 65 years of age or older. The median age was 35 years. For every 100 females there were 95.7 males. For every 100 females age 18 and over, there were 93.7 males.

The median income for a household in the village was $45,078, and the median income for a family was $51,838. Males had a median income of $67,045 versus $22,500 for females. The per capita income for the village was $18,355. About 2.7% of families and 4.5% of the population were below the poverty line, including 4.4% of those under age 18 and 4.4% of those age 65 or over.

=== 2010 census ===
As of the census of 2010, there were 1,830 people, 734 households, and 490 families living in the village. The population density was 1,211.9 inhabitants per square mile (467.9/km^{2}). There were 788 housing units at an average density of 521.9 per square mile (201.5/km^{2}). The racial makeup of the village was 96.7% White, 0.3% African American, 0.1% Native American, 0.9% Asian, 0.1% Pacific Islander, 0.1% from other races, and 2.0% from two or more races. Hispanic or Latino of any race were 1.5% of the population.

There were 734 households, of which 32.8% had children under the age of 18 living with them, 55.0% were married couples living together, 7.6% had a female householder with no husband present, 4.1% had a male householder with no wife present, and 33.2% were non-families. 30.9% of all households were made up of individuals, and 17.7% had someone living alone who was 65 years of age or older. The average household size was 2.40 and the average family size was 2.99.

The median age in the village was 43.4 years. 23.9% of residents were under the age of 18; 6.6% were between the ages of 18 and 24; 21.6% were from 25 to 44; 28.8% were from 45 to 64; and 19.1% were 65 years of age or older. The gender makeup of the village was 47.3% male and 52.7% female.

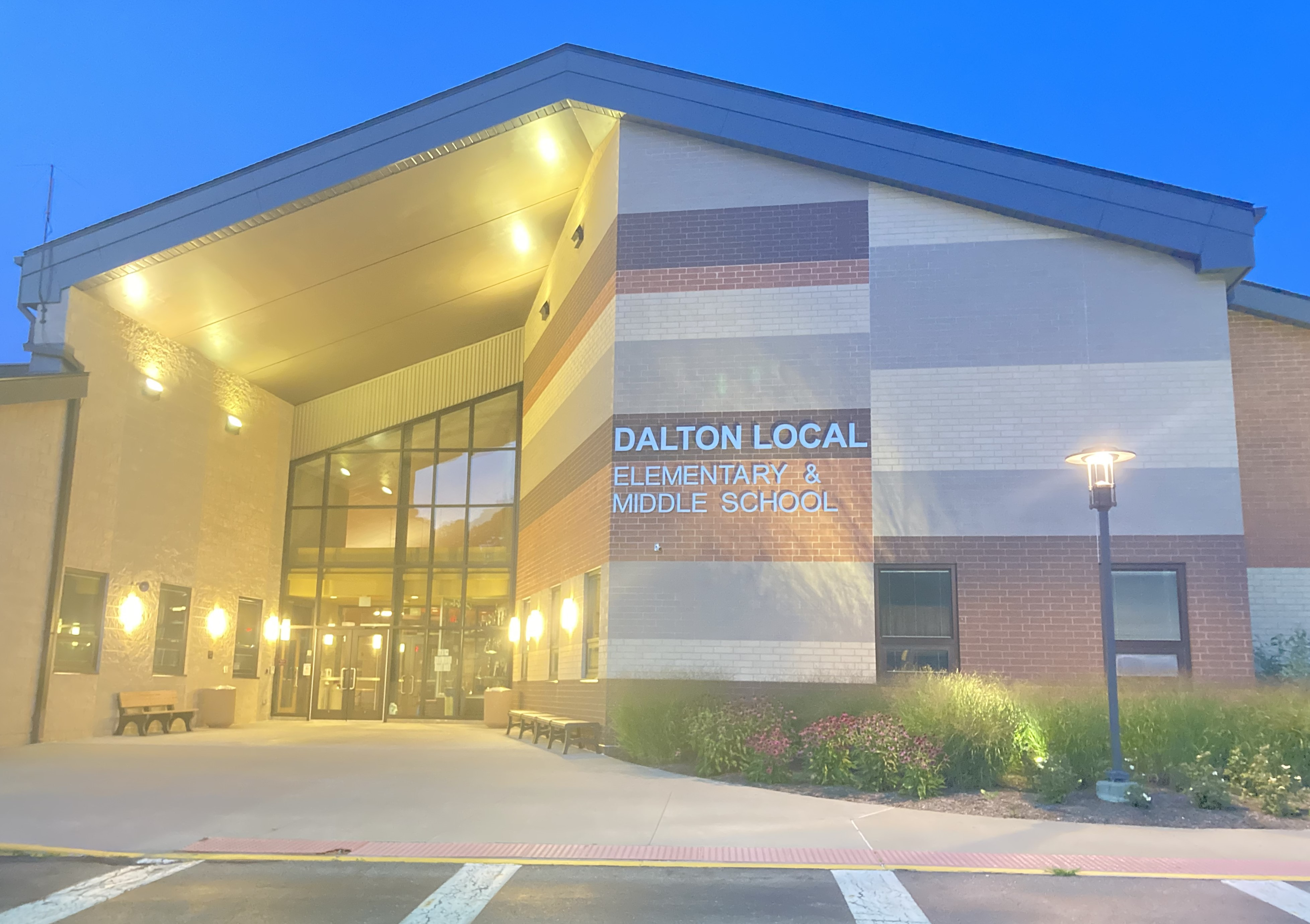
Dalton Elementary and Middle School

== Education ==
Dalton is served by a branch of the Wayne County Public Library.

== Notable people ==
- Chris Kirkpatrick, member of the music group *NSYNC
- Justin Thomas, Boston Red Sox baseball pitcher
