= Burbank, Ohio =

- Village
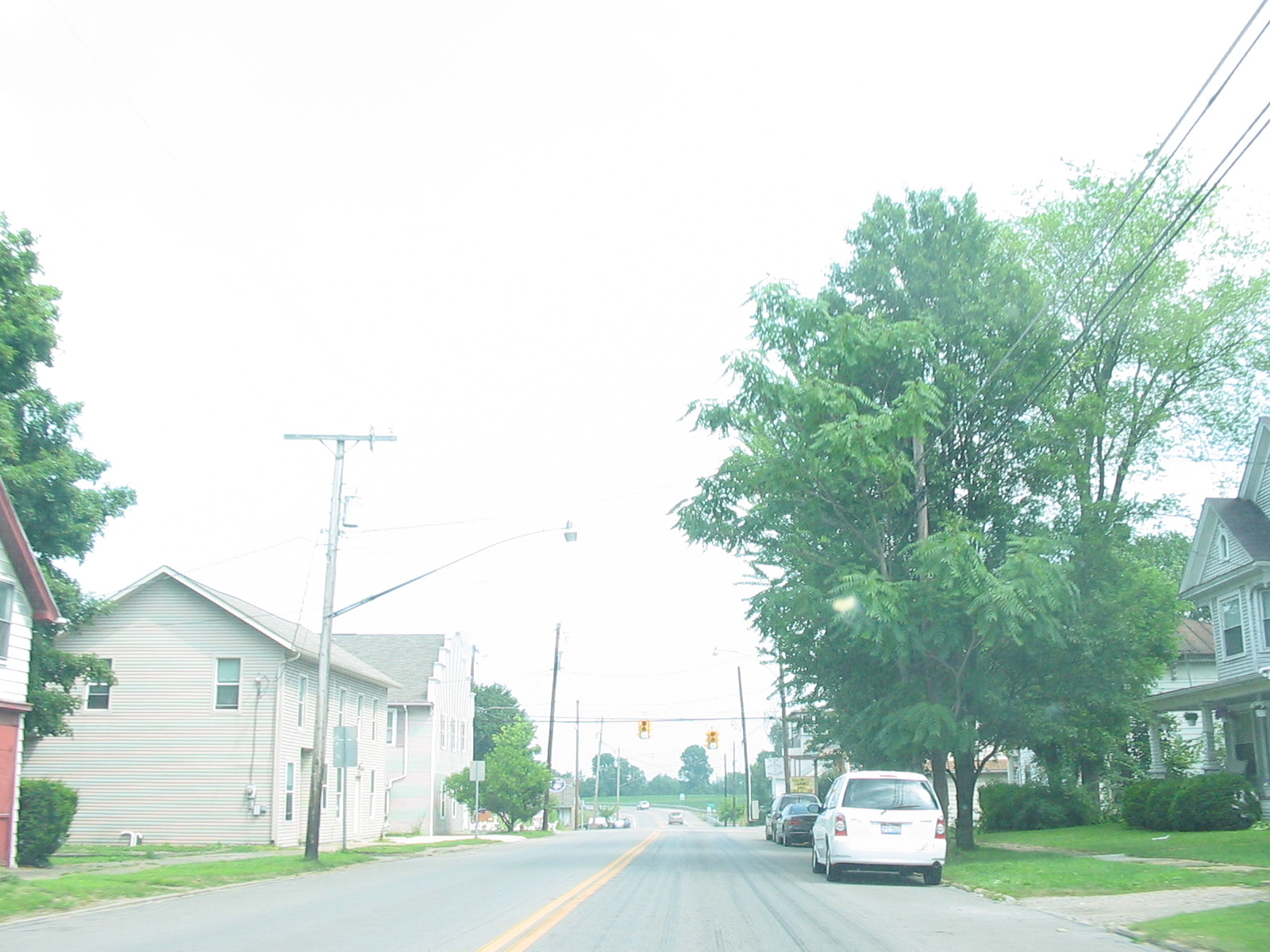
- Central Burbank

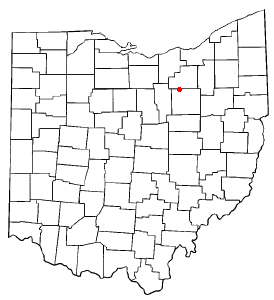
- Location of Burbank, Ohio

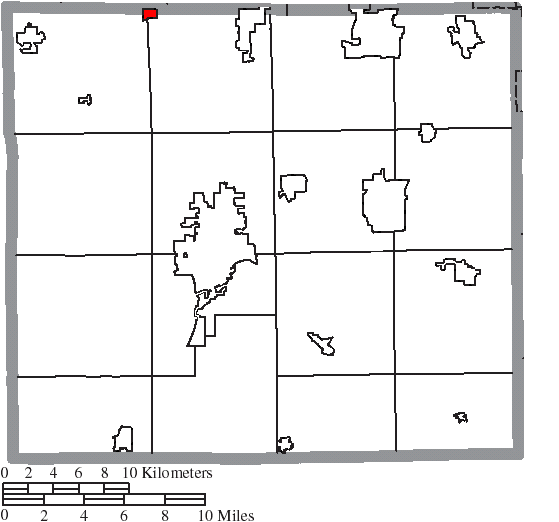
- Location of Burbank in Wayne County
- Coordinates: 40°59′03″N 81°59′56″W
- Country: United States
- State: Ohio
- County: Wayne

Area
  - Total: 0.36 sq mi (0.92 km^{2})
  - Land: 0.36 sq mi (0.92 km^{2})
  - Water: 0 sq mi (0.00 km^{2})
- Elevation: 991 ft (302 m)

Population (2020)
  - Total: 296
  - Estimate (2023): 293
  - Density: 832.0/sq mi (321.24/km^{2})
- Time zone: UTC-5 (Eastern (EST))
  - Summer (DST): UTC-4 (EDT)
- ZIP code: 44214
- Area code: 330
- FIPS code: 39-10254
- GNIS feature ID: 2397495
- Website: villageofburbankohio.com

Burbank is a village in Wayne County, Ohio, United States, along Killbuck Creek. The population was 296 at the 2020 census.

== Geography ==
According to the United States Census Bureau, the village has a total area of 0.35 square miles (0.91 km^{2}), all of it land.

== Demographics ==
Historical population
Census	Pop.	Note	%±
1870	258		—
1880	293		13.6%
1890	331		13.0%
1900	325		−1.8%
1910	351		8.0%
1920	300		−14.5%
1930	299		−0.3%
1940	348		16.4%
1950	393		12.9%
1960	324		−17.6%
1970	354		9.3%
1980	365		3.1%
1990	289		−20.8%
2000	279		−3.5%
2010	207		−25.8%
2020	296		43.0%
2023 (est.)	293	▼	−1.0%
U.S. Decennial Census

=== 2010 census ===
As of the census of 2010, there were 207 people, 81 households, and 59 families living in the village. The population density was 591.4 inhabitants per square mile (228.3/km^{2}). There were 102 housing units at an average density of 291.4 per square mile (112.5/km^{2}). The racial makeup of the village was 97.6% White, 1.0% African American, 0.5% Native American, and 1.0% from two or more races. Hispanic or Latino of any race were 0.5% of the population.

There were 81 households, of which 34.6% had children under the age of 18 living with them, 49.4% were married couples living together, 16.0% had a female householder with no husband present, 7.4% had a male householder with no wife present, and 27.2% were non-families. 18.5% of all households were made up of individuals, and 8.6% had someone living alone who was 65 years of age or older. The average household size was 2.56 and the average family size was 2.76.

The median age in the village was 41.1 years. 23.7% of residents were under the age of 18; 9.2% were between the ages of 18 and 24; 24.6% were from 25 to 44; 27% were from 45 to 64; and 15.5% were 65 years of age or older. The gender makeup of the village was 51.7% male and 48.3% female.

=== 2000 census ===
As of the census of 2000, there were 279 people, 103 households, and 76 families living in the village. The population density was 842.3 inhabitants per square mile (325.2/km^{2}). There were 107 housing units at an average density of 323.0 per square mile (124.7/km^{2}). The racial makeup of the village was 98.92% White, 0.72% Asian, and 0.36% from two or more races. Hispanic or Latino of any race were 1.08% of the population.

There were 103 households, out of which 34.0% had children under the age of 18 living with them, 56.3% were married couples living together, 10.7% had a female householder with no husband present, and 26.2% were non-families. 17.5% of all households were made up of individuals, and 7.8% had someone living alone who was 65 years of age or older. The average household size was 2.71 and the average family size was 2.97.

In the village, the population was spread out, with 26.2% under the age of 18, 10.4% from 18 to 24, 31.9% from 25 to 44, 21.1% from 45 to 64, and 10.4% who were 65 years of age or older. The median age was 34 years. For every 100 females there were 111.4 males. For every 100 females age 18 and over, there were 110.2 males.

The median income for a household in the village was $39,375, and the median income for a family was $39,375. Males had a median income of $30,313 versus $23,393 for females. The per capita income for the village was $17,557. About 6.8% of families and 7.2% of the population were below the poverty line, including 5.1% of those under the age of eighteen and 12.5% of those 65 or over.
