= West Salem, Ohio =

- Village
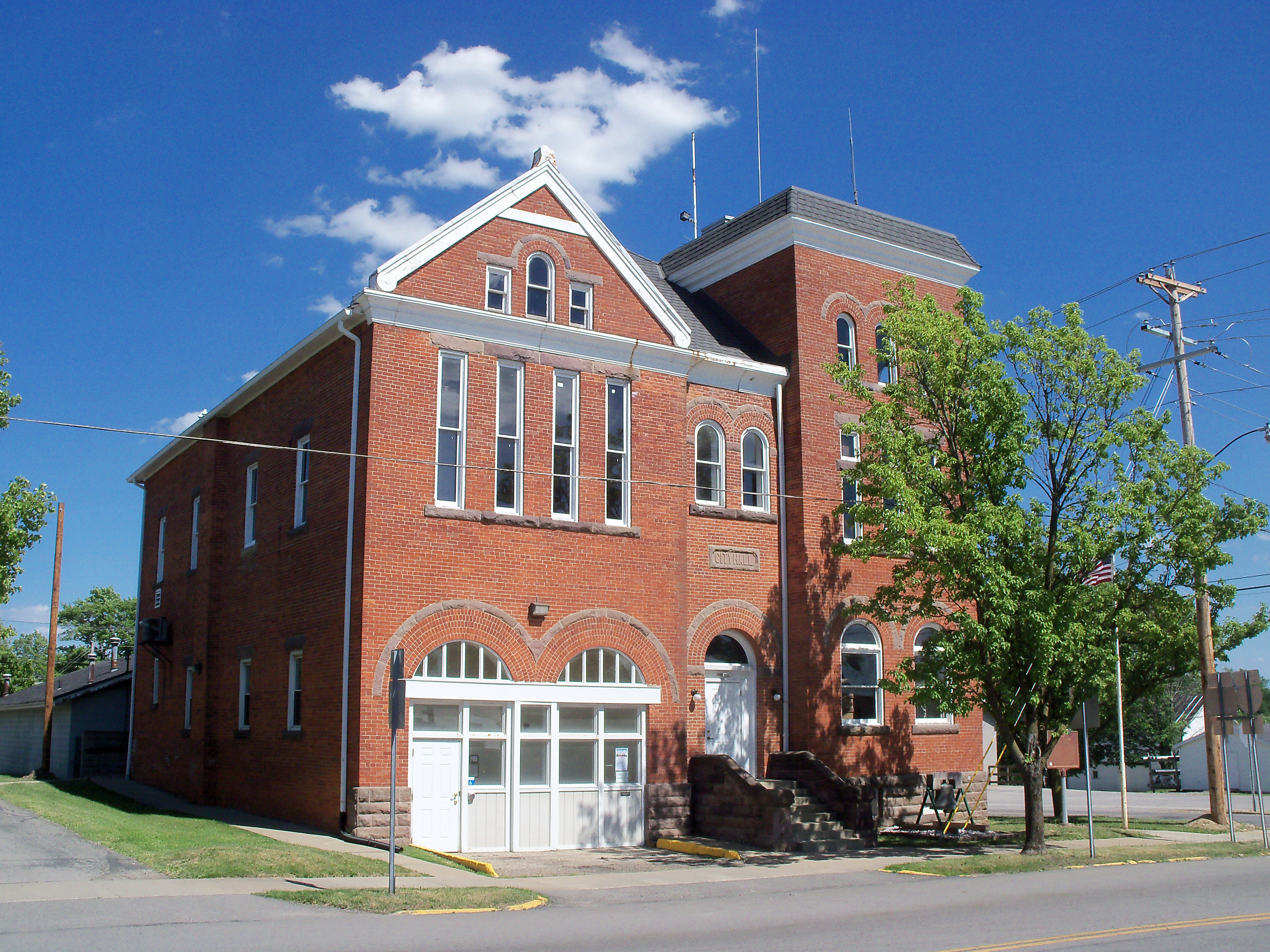
- City Hall (1899)

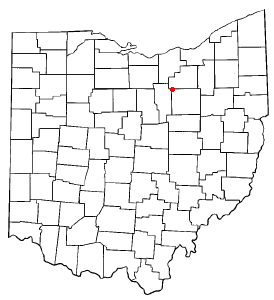
- Location of West Salem, Ohio

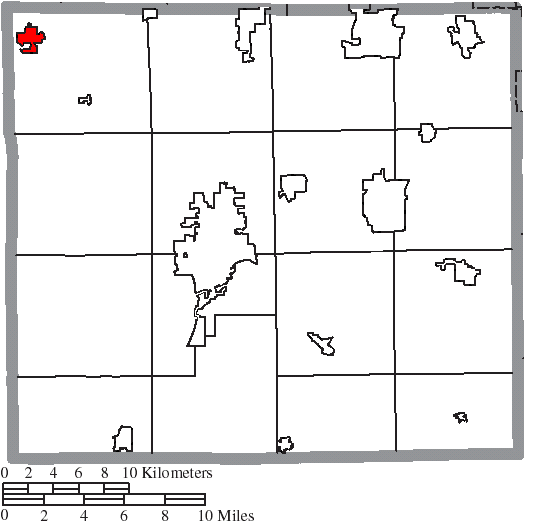
- Location of West Salem in Wayne County
- Coordinates: 40°58′10″N 82°06′29″W
- Country: United States
- State: Ohio
- County: Wayne

Area
  - Total: 1.07 sq mi (2.77 km^{2})
  - Land: 1.07 sq mi (2.76 km^{2})
  - Water: 0.0039 sq mi (0.01 km^{2})
- Elevation: 1,093 ft (333 m)

Population (2020)
  - Total: 1,430
  - Density: 1,340.0/sq mi (517.36/km^{2})
- Time zone: UTC-5 (Eastern (EST))
  - Summer (DST): UTC-4 (EDT)
- ZIP code: 44287
- Area code: 419
- FIPS code: 39-84196
- GNIS feature ID: 2400143
- Website: westsalemvillage.com

West Salem is a village in Wayne County, Ohio. The population was 1,430 at the time of the 2020 census. West Salem is served by a branch of the Wayne County Public Library.

== History ==
West Salem was laid out in 1834.

== Geography ==
According to the United States Census Bureau, the village has a total area of 1.09 square miles (2.82 km^{2}), all of it land.

== Demographics ==
Historical population
Census	Pop.	Note	%±
1870	713		—
1880	878		23.1%
1890	756		−13.9%
1900	656		−13.2%
1910	642		−2.1%
1920	636		−0.9%
1930	645		1.4%
1940	700		8.5%
1950	860		22.9%
1960	1,017		18.3%
1970	1,058		4.0%
1980	1,357		28.3%
1990	1,534		13.0%
2000	1,501		−2.2%
2010	1,464		−2.5%
2020	1,430		−2.3%
U.S. Decennial Census

=== 2010 census ===
As of the census of 2010, there were 1,464 people, 558 households, and 393 families living in the village. The population density was 1,343.1 inhabitants per square mile (518.6/km^{2}). There were 620 housing units at an average density of 568.8 per square mile (219.6/km^{2}). The racial makeup of the village was 97.8% White, 0.1% African American, 0.1% Native American, 1.0% from other races, and 1.0% from two or more races. Hispanic or Latino of any race were 2.1% of the population.

There were 558 households, of which 38.7% had children under the age of 18 living with them, 48.0% were married couples living together, 14.2% had a female householder with no husband present, 8.2% had a male householder with no wife present, and 29.6% were non-families. 23.7% of all households were made up of individuals, and 7.7% had someone living alone who was 65 years of age or older. The average household size was 2.62 and the average family size was 3.00.

The median age in the village was 37.1 years. 27.1% of residents were under the age of 18; 8% were between the ages of 18 and 24; 27% were from 25 to 44; 27.2% were from 45 to 64; and 10.9% were 65 years of age or older. The gender makeup of the village was 50.6% male and 49.4% female.

=== 2000 census ===
As of the census of 2000, there were 1,501 people, 573 households, and 389 families living in the village. The population density was 1,453.1 inhabitants per square mile (561.0/km^{2}). There were 620 housing units at an average density of 600.2 per square mile (231.7/km^{2}). The racial makeup of the village was 97.34% White, 0.13% African American, 0.27% Native American, 0.40% Asian, 0.20% Pacific Islander, 0.33% from other races, and 1.33% from two or more races. Hispanic or Latino of any race were 0.93% of the population.

There were 573 households, out of which 39.6% had children under the age of 18 living with them, 51.7% were married couples living together, 12.2% had a female householder with no husband present, and 32.1% were non-families. 27.2% of all households were made up of individuals, and 10.3% had someone living alone who was 65 years of age or older. The average household size was 2.62 and the average family size was 3.19.

In the village, the population was spread out, with 31.0% under the age of 18, 7.5% from 18 to 24, 32.8% from 25 to 44, 19.3% from 45 to 64, and 9.5% who were 65 years of age or older. The median age was 32 years. For every 100 females there were 100.1 males. For every 100 females age 18 and over, there were 96.2 males.

The median income for a household in the village was $36,563, and the median income for a family was $41,250. Males had a median income of $31,393 versus $20,947 for females. The per capita income for the village was $14,309. About 6.4% of families and 7.9% of the population were below the poverty line, including 8.2% of those under age 18 and 11.0% of those age 65 or over.

== Notable people ==
- Dean Chance, major league baseball pitcher
- J.A. Hines, member of the Wisconsin State Assembly
- Zeola Hershey Misener, suffragist and member of the Indiana General Assembly
- Jacob Parrott, Civil War Medal of Honor recipient, 1862
