= Cloverleaf Local School District =

School district in Ohio, United States

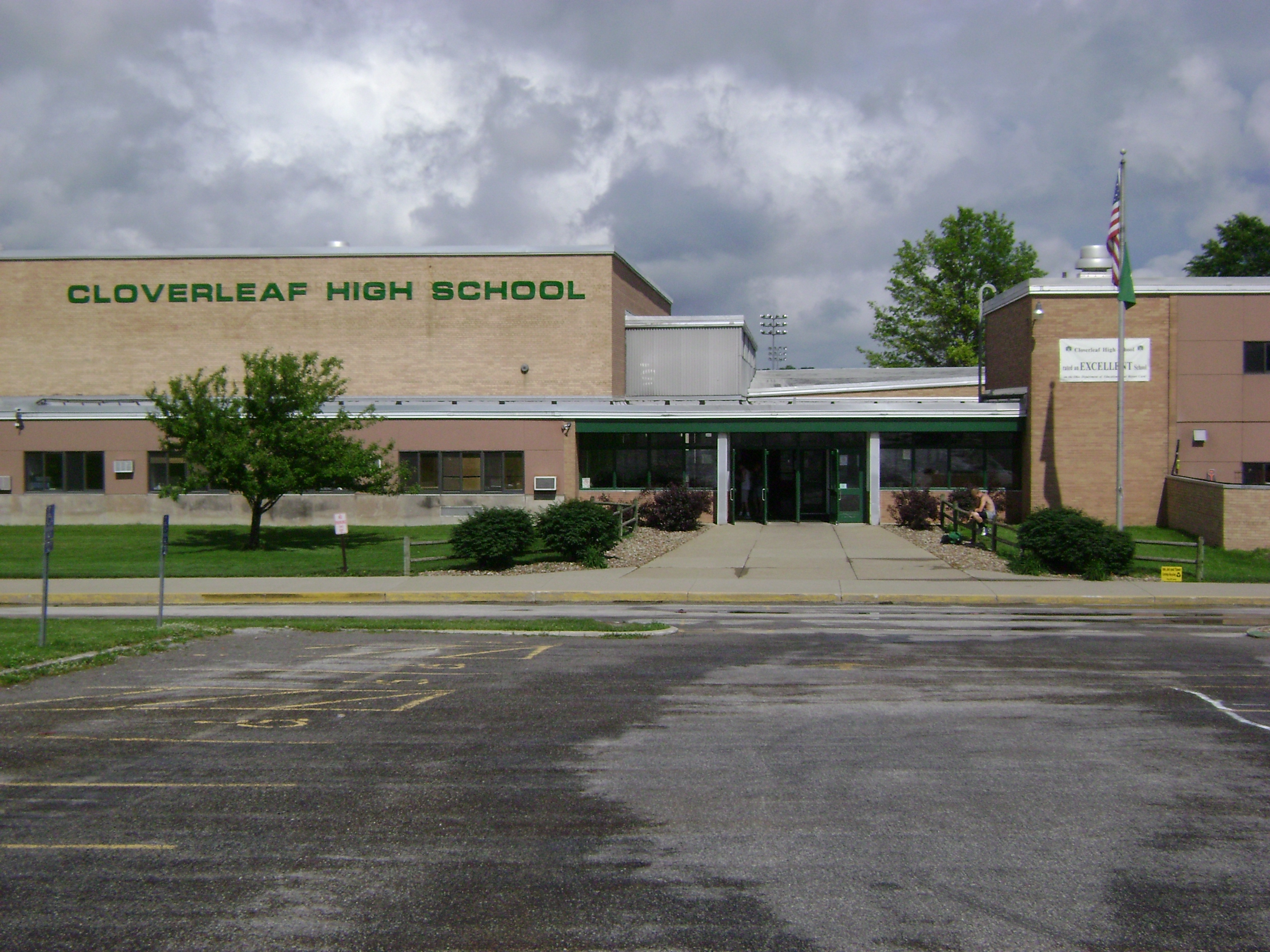
Cloverleaf High School.

The Cloverleaf Local School District is a public school district located in southern Medina County, Ohio, United States. It includes three facilities, all located in Westfield Township, between the villages of Lodi and Westfield Center:

- Cloverleaf High School, Grades 9-12
- Cloverleaf Middle School, Grades 6-8
- Cloverleaf Elementary School, Grades Pre-K-5

== History ==
Cloverleaf Local School District was formed in 1957 as a consolidation of the formerly independent local schools of Lodi, Leroy (now known as Westfield Center), Seville, Chatham, and Lafayette, as well as the vast rural areas between them (including the Chippewa Lake area). Cloverleaf Senior High School opened in 1960 and graduated its first class in 1961. At one time, the Cloverleaf Local School District comprised the largest geographical school district in the State of Ohio. In the 2004-2005 school year, the district switched from individual K-6 elementary schools in each town to the current "elementary center" configuration. At that time, Cloverleaf High School also transitioned from a semester schedule to a trimester schedule in an effort to reduce expenses.

== Academic performance ==
The school district received the highest rating given in the state of Ohio, 'Excellent' for three consecutive years from 2003-2006. However, the 2006-2007, 2007-2008 and 2008-2009 report cards lowered the district one rank to 'Effective. The school district once again returned to an 'Excellent' rating in 2009-2010 school year. In 2012 the Cloverleaf school district was the only Ohio school district ever to be in fiscal emergency and ranked "Excellent with Distinction".
