= Lodi, Ohio =

- Village
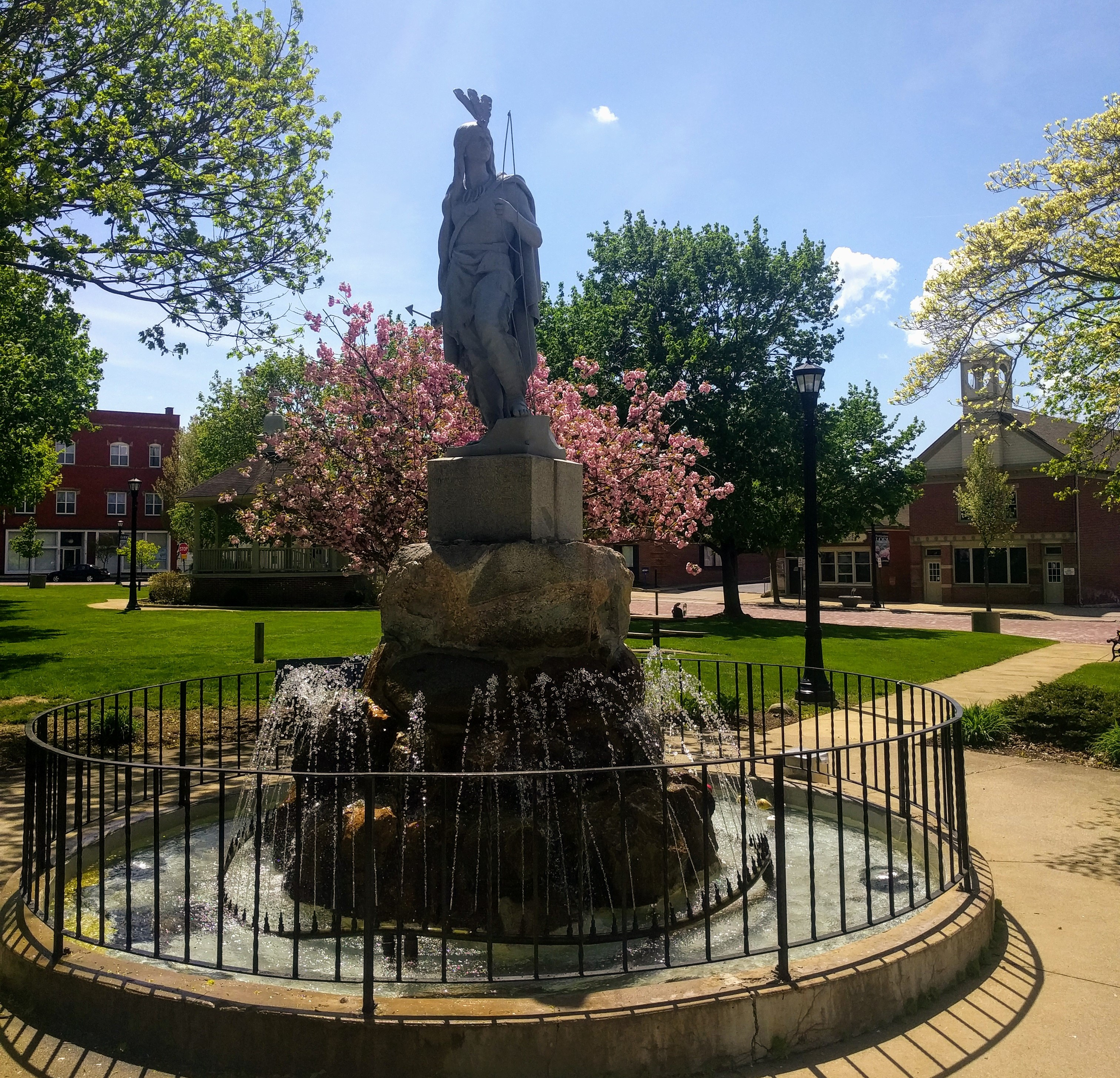
- Community Park, Downtown Lodi

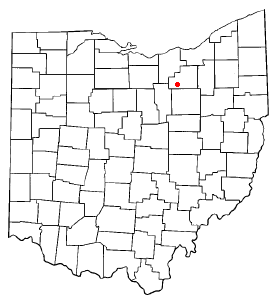
- Location of Lodi, Ohio

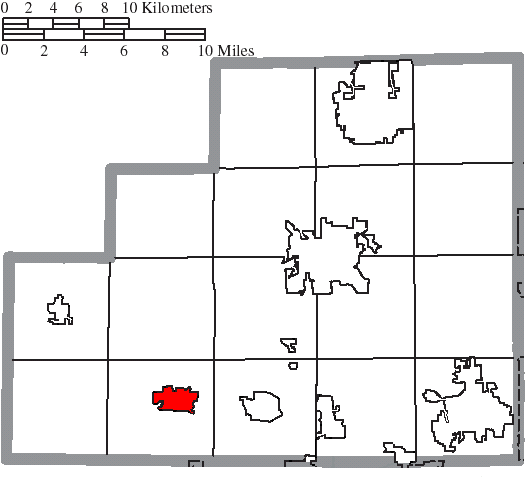
- Location of Lodi in Medina County
- Coordinates: 41°02′07″N 82°00′25″W
- Country: United States
- State: Ohio
- County: Medina
- Founded: 1811; 215 years ago
- Incorporated: 1891; 135 years ago (village)

Government
  - Type: Mayor-Council
  - Mayor: Robert Geissman

Area
  - Total: 2.26 sq mi (5.85 km^{2})
  - Land: 2.25 sq mi (5.83 km^{2})
  - Water: 0.0077 sq mi (0.02 km^{2})
- Elevation: 906 ft (276 m)

Population (2020)
  - Total: 2,746
  - Density: 1,219.8/sq mi (470.95/km^{2})
- Time zone: UTC-5 (Eastern (EST))
  - Summer (DST): UTC-4 (EDT)
- ZIP code: 44254
- Area code: 330
- FIPS code: 39-44604
- GNIS feature ID: 2398466
- Website: villageoflodi.com

Lodi (/ˈloʊdaɪ/ LOH-dye) is a village in Harrisville Township, Medina County, Ohio, United States. It is located southwest of the City of Medina along U.S. Route 42. As of the 2020 census, the population was 2,746.

== History ==
Founded in 1811, Lodi is the oldest settlement in Medina County. It was originally called Harrisville, in honor of Judge Joseph Harris. The community's name echoes that of the city of Lodi in northern Italy, where Napoleon won a victory in 1796. The year of incorporation was 1891.

An early pioneer named Redfield (after whom Redfield Street is named) sculpted the modern route to Medina through trees. It was later deemed too curvy, so the first governmental road through the region was straightened. In later years, this road became U.S. Route 42.

== Geography ==
Lodi is located along the East Fork of the Black River.

According to the United States Census Bureau, the village has a total area of 2.26 square miles (5.85 km^{2}), of which 2.25 square miles (5.83 km^{2}) is land and 0.01 square miles (0.03 km^{2}) is water.

The East Fork of the Black River enters the village from the north and turns back north to empty into Lake Erie, as Lodi is on the north–south continental divide. Rain water runs off in either a northerly direction to Lake Erie or a southernly direction to the Ohio River.

== Demographics ==
Historical population
Census	Pop.	Note	%±
1880	437		—
1890	568		30.0%
1900	846		48.9%
1910	1,015		20.0%
1920	1,240		22.2%
1930	1,273		2.7%
1940	1,304		2.4%
1950	1,523		16.8%
1960	2,213		45.3%
1970	2,399		8.4%
1980	2,942		22.6%
1990	3,042		3.4%
2000	3,061		0.6%
2010	2,746		−10.3%
2020	2,746		0.0%
U.S. Decennial Census

=== 2010 census ===
As of the census of 2010, there were 2,746 people, 1,178 households, and 726 families living in the village. The population density was 1,220.4 inhabitants per square mile (471.2/km^{2}). There were 1,370 housing units at an average density of 608.9 per square mile (235.1/km^{2}). The racial makeup of the village was 98.1% White, 0.4% African American, 0.1% Native American, 0.2% Asian, 0.1% from other races, and 1.0% from two or more races. Hispanic or Latino of any race were 1.1% of the population.

There were 1,178 households, of which 28.8% had children under the age of 18 living with them, 42.7% were married couples living together, 12.6% had a female householder with no husband present, 6.3% had a male householder with no wife present, and 38.4% were non-families. 32.3% of all households were made up of individuals, and 14.1% had someone living alone who was 65 years of age or older. The average household size was 2.31 and the average family size was 2.87.

The median age in the village was 41.6 years. 22% of residents were under the age of 18; 8.1% were between the ages of 18 and 24; 24% were from 25 to 44; 28.8% were from 45 to 64; and 17% were 65 years of age or older. The gender makeup of the village was 48.0% male and 52.0% female.

=== 2000 census ===
As of the census of 2000, there were 3,061 people, 1,274 households, and 789 families living in the village. The population density was 1,444.5 inhabitants per square mile (557.7/km^{2}). There were 1,341 housing units at an average density of 632.8 per square mile (244.3/km^{2}). The racial makeup of the village was 98.50% White, 0.03% African American, 0.36% Native American, 0.16% Asian, 0.07% from other races, and 0.88% from two or more races. Hispanic or Latino of any race were 0.49% of the population.

There were 1,274 households, out of which 30.4% had children under the age of 18 living with them, 47.2% were married couples living together, 11.7% had a female householder with no husband present, and 38.0% were non-families. 32.5% of all households were made up of individuals, and 13.4% had someone living alone who was 65 years of age or older. The average household size was 2.39 and the average family size was 3.05.

In the village, the population was spread out, with 25.6% under the age of 18, 8.0% from 18 to 24, 29.7% from 25 to 44, 22.1% from 45 to 64, and 14.6% who were 65 years of age or older. The median age was 36 years. For every 100 females there were 89.8 males. For every 100 females age 18 and over, there were 87.1 males.

The median income for a household in the village was $32,679, and the median income for a family was $43,333. Males had a median income of $32,882 versus $21,014 for females. The per capita income for the village was $16,512. About 8.3% of families and 10.1% of the population were below the poverty line, including 18.5% of those under age 18 and 5.0% of those age 65 or over.

== Education ==
Public schools are administered by the Cloverleaf Local School District. Lodi Primary School served preschoolers, kindergarteners, and first and second graders. Grades three and four were sent to Seville Intermediate School, and fifth and sixth graders attended Westfield Upper Elementary. The communities of Chatham, Lafayette, Westfield Center, Seville, and Lodi combined to form Cloverleaf Middle School and Cloverleaf High School. With the building of the new Cloverleaf Elementary now situated across the street from Cloverleaf High School, the current buildings are now empty.

Lodi has a public library, a branch of Medina County District Library.

== Culture ==
Lodi once hosted the annual Sweet Corn Festival in the middle of July. This three-day-long event that began with a large parade through the town square. Other attractions included fair food and amusement rides. The last sweet corn festival was held in 2019 for only one day instead of three. Lodi no longer hosts the Lodi Sweet Corn Festival. In 2019 the first Annual Parkstock Music Festival was adopted. This is a gathering of bands with proceeds going to the local parks.

== Notable people ==
- Ryan Brown, cartoonist, born in Lodi, May 2, 1962. Best known for his work on Teenage Mutant Ninja Turtles.
