= Cloverleaf High School =

Public school in Medina County, Ohio, United States

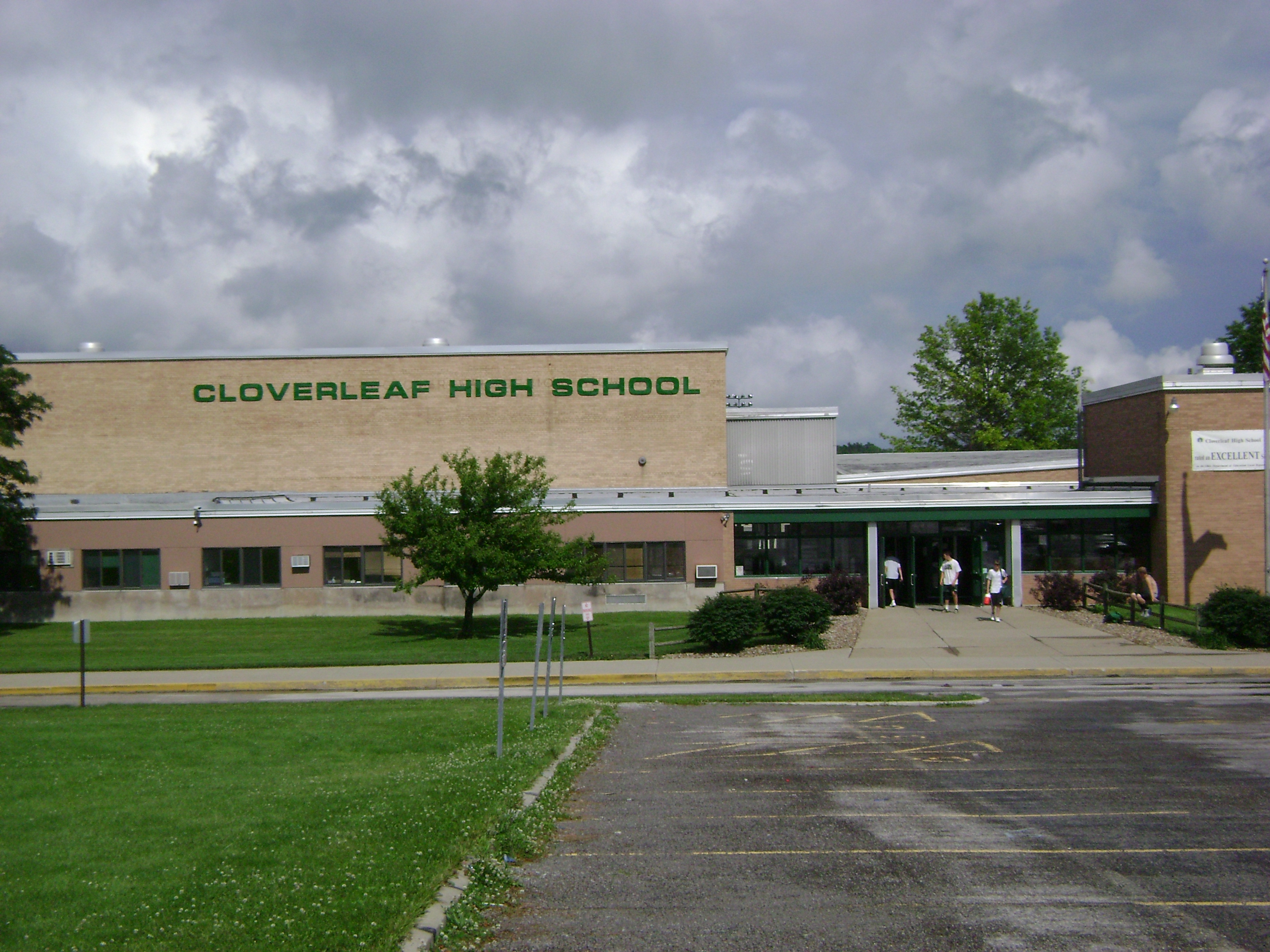

Location
- 8525 Buffham Road; Lodi, Ohio 44254; United States; 41.041°N 81.966°W

Information
- Type: Public
- School district: Cloverleaf Local School District
- Principal: Gary Miller
- Assistant Principal: Thomas Barton Randolph
- Staff: 42.90 (FTE)
- Grades: 9 to 12
- Enrollment: 595 (2023–24)
- Student to teacher ratio: 13.87
- Colors: Forest Green and White
- Athletics conference: Metro Athletic Conference
- Team name: Colts
- Website: www.cloverleaflocal.org/o/hs

Cloverleaf High School is a public high school located in Westfield Township, between the villages of Lodi and Westfield Center in Medina County, Ohio, United States. It is the only high school in the Cloverleaf Local School District.

The school's colors are forest green and white.

== Academic achievement ==
Cloverleaf has received the highest rating awarded by the Ohio Department of Education of 'Excellent' for three straight years.

== Notable alumni ==
- Kyle Juszczyk – professional football player in the National Football League (NFL)
