= R. Sheldon Duecker =

American bishop (1926–2011)

Robert Sheldon Duecker
- Bishop
- Church: United Methodist Church
- Diocese: Northern Illinois
- Elected: 1988
- Retired: 1996
- Other post: Chairperson of the North Central Jurisdiction Korean Mission Ministry
- Previous posts: North Indiana Conference pastorates, director of the Conference Council on Ministries, superintendent of the Fort Wayne District.

Orders
- Ordination: 1952 (Deacon), 1953 (Elder) by Bishop Richard Campbell Raines

Personal details
- Born: September 4, 1926 Westfield Township, Medina County, Ohio
- Died: October 28, 2011 (aged 85) Fort Wayne, Indiana
- Education: Indiana Wesleyan University, Christian Theological Seminary, Garrett Theological Seminary

Robert Sheldon Duecker (4 September 1926 – 28 October 2011) was an American bishop of the United Methodist Church, elected in 1988.

== Birth and family ==
He was born in Westfield Township, Medina County, Ohio, a son of Howard LaVerne and Sarah Faye Simpson Duecker. He grew up in the villages of LeRoy and Chippewa Lake, Ohio. He was confirmed in the Christian Faith in the LeRoy Methodist Episcopal Church.

== Education ==
He earned an A.B. degree in Religion from the Indiana Wesleyan University, Marion, Indiana in 1948. He earned a Bachelor of Divinity and an M.S. from the Christian Theological Seminary (C.T.S.), Indianapolis, Indiana in 1952. He did further graduate work at Garrett Theological Seminary, Evanston, Illinois in 1952–53. He received an honorary Doctor of Divinity degree in 1969 from C.T.S.

== Ordained ministry ==
He was ordained into the ministry of the Methodist Church, North Indiana Annual Conference, (Deacon in 1952, Elder in 1953) by Bishop Richard Campbell Raines. Prior to his election to the episcopacy, Duecker had served the following pastorates in the North Indiana Conference: Kokomo: Grace (Associate Pastor); Dyer Muncie: Gethsemane; Hartford City: Grace; Warsaw: First; Fort Wayne: Simpson; and Muncie: High Street. He also served as the Director of the Conference Council on Ministries, and as the superintendent of the Fort Wayne District.

== Episcopal ministry ==
In 1988 while serving as senior pastor of the High Street U.M. Church in Muncie, Indiana, Duecker was elected a bishop by the North Central Jurisdictional Conference of the U.M. Church, and assigned to the Northern Illinois (Chicago) Episcopal Area.

Bishop Duecker served (1980–84) on the General Council on Ministries of the U.M. Church, the General Advance Committee, and as a liaison from the Advance Committee to the Committee on African Church Growth and Development. He was also a member of the Commission to Study the Mission of The United Methodist Church (1984–88). He served on the General Board of Publication (1988–92). During 1992–96 he was a member of the General Board of Higher Education and Ministry, as well as of the University Senate of the U.M. Church. He served in several responsibilities related to ministry with Korean people, including (1988–96) the Committee on Korean-American Ministries and the Committee on Joint Mission Strategy for the U.M. Church and the Korean Methodist Church. He was the Chairperson of the North Central Jurisdiction Korean Mission Ministry, 1992–96.

Duecker retired in 1996 and lives in Indiana.

== See also ==
- List of bishops of the United Methodist Church
