= Lionel Dahmer =

American chemist and author (1936–2023)

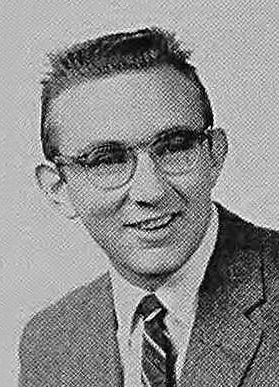
- University yearbook portrait, 1958
- Born: Lionel Herbert Dahmer; July 29, 1936; West Allis, Wisconsin, U.S.
- Died: December 5, 2023 (aged 87); Medina, Ohio, U.S.
- Education: University of Wisconsin–Madison (BS); Marquette University (MS); Iowa State University (PhD)
- Occupations: Chemist; author
- Notable work: A Father's Story (1994)
- Spouses: Joyce Flint (m. 1959; div. 1978); Shari Jordan (m. 1978; died 2023)
- Children: 2, including Jeffrey
- Scientific career
- Fields: Analytical chemistry
- Thesis: Chromatographic Separations of Niobium, Tantalum, Molybdenum, and Tungsten (1966)
- Doctoral advisor: James S. Fritz

Lionel Herbert Dahmer (/ˈdɑːmər/; July 29, 1936 – December 5, 2023) was an American chemist and author. He is the father of the serial killer Jeffrey Dahmer. In 1994, he wrote A Father's Story, a non-fiction account of his son's upbringing as well as Jeffrey’s subsequent serial murders and their aftermath. Lionel has been a controversial figure since his son's crimes came to light, accused along with his first wife of neglecting Jeffrey while he was a child.

== Early life and education ==
Lionel Herbert Dahmer was born in West Allis, Wisconsin, on July 29, 1936 as the oldest of two children to Herbert Walter Dahmer (1903–1971), a high-school math teacher and barber, whom Dahmer described as "a good father, as caring and concerned as any child would wish," and Catherine Jemima Hughes (1904–1992), an elementary school history teacher. Dahmer was of German ancestry by father and Welsh ancestry by mother.

Dahmer received his primary education and secondary education at local Wisconsin schools and enjoyed a relatively good childhood. Dahmer enrolled in the University of Wisconsin–Madison in 1954 and obtained his BS in chemistry in 1959. Dahmer married later that year, on August 22, to a 23-year-old teletype instructor named Joyce Annette Flint (1936–2000).

== Family and career ==
In A Father's Story, Dahmer related that, from the very beginning, their marriage struggled due to Joyce's poor mental health and irascible and tempestuous behavior and his own inability to fully keep up with it. Shortly after Joyce got pregnant, she began to suffer seizure episodes and was irritated by their neighbor's kitchen's foul odors, which caused them to move out to Dahmer's parents' home, shortly before their firstborn's delivery in early 1960, to receive attention from his parents. During the latter months of the pregnancy, Joyce suffered from increased mental breakdowns and seizures, which, according to her doctor, "were rooted in Joyce's mental, rather than physical state" and which aggravated her already severe prescription barbiturate and morphine addiction, to the point of taking as "many as twenty-six pills a day" and being constantly sedated to ease her pain. Decades after, he reflected about the long-lasting and eventual terminal effect in his marriage:

In any event, we never really came to terms with the conflicts of that first year. Because of that, I think that this first troubled experience laid the foundation for a longer, and even more troubled, marriage. In some sense, our relationship never recovered from the damage done to it at this early stage, never really improved.

During the early years of Jeffrey's life, Dahmer's academic responsibilities and, later on, long work shifts prevented him from spending enough time with his wife and children. Shortly after Jeffrey's birth, Dahmer received a Master of Science degree from Marquette University in 1962. Later, he enrolled at Iowa State University, where he earned a Doctor of Philosophy degree in October 1966. He described himself as average and even considered himself a mediocre student:

I was never a great student. What others got quickly, took me much longer. I was a plodder, a plugger, a hard worker. For me, anything less than an all-out effort would mean failure. Others had flashes of creative brilliance, of sudden illumination, but I had only the power of my own will.

After divorcing Joyce in 1978, Dahmer married Shari Jordan and moved to Granger, Ohio. In between his time at Marquette and Iowa Universities, Dahmer worked for PPG Industries.

== Arrest of Jeffrey Dahmer and aftermath ==
Before Jeffrey's arrest on July 22, 1991, Dahmer had already shown signs of concern about his son's behavior. In 1989, when Jeffrey was arrested for child molestation, Dahmer wrote to the trial judge, William Gardner, asking him to keep Jeffrey in prison, expressing reservations about Jeffrey's future behavior if released without being provided with psychological help. Dahmer read the short letter that he wrote to Judge Gardner during a 2020 documentary.

I have reservations regarding Jeff’s chances when he hits the streets. I have experienced an extremely frustrating time trying to urge initiation of some type of treatment. I sincerely hope that you might intervene in some way to help my son, who I love very much and for whom I want a better life. I do feel, though, that this may be our last chance to initiate something lasting and that you can hold the key.

Jeffrey was nonetheless released earlier in May 1990.

Dahmer relates in his book how he struggled to comprehend the scope of his son's crimes. Dahmer chronicles that the morning of July 23, 1991, he called Jeffrey's apartment to check on his son after he had missed a visit to his grandmother in West Allis. He was then informed by a detective that Jeffrey had been arrested. The following months were difficult for Dahmer, as he and his family struggled with harassing phone calls and reporters. Dahmer was particularly affected by his mother's (Jeffrey's grandmother) reaction to the news, especially after acts of vandalism against the elderly woman's house in West Allis and other acts of intimidation. Lionel Dahmer's mother and Jeffrey Dahmer's grandmother, Catherine Dahmer, died on December 25, 1992, in a nursing home in Milwaukee at the age of 88.

Dahmer visited his son regularly while he was in prison. In February 1994, both appeared together on an NBC interview with Stone Phillips.

== Later years and death ==
Dahmer appeared on The Oprah Winfrey Show in 1994, shortly after Jeffrey's murder. Dahmer told Oprah Winfrey that he still loved Jeffrey and that he would always stand by him.

Dahmer, along with his former wife Joyce and wife Shari, was sued by the family of Steven Hicks—Jeffrey's first victim—with the cause for the claim being negligent in raising Jeffrey.

In 2004, Dahmer appeared on Larry King Live along with his second wife, Shari. During the interview, Dahmer told Larry King that parents should not disregard shyness in their children, while commenting on his family's new life, including his grandchildren and his other son's life in anonymity. Dahmer and Shari also reaffirmed King that they were proud of the surname Dahmer, and they did not intend to change their names.

In 2020, Dahmer appeared in Jeffrey Dahmer: Mind of a Monster. In 2022, Dahmer considered suing Netflix over the series Dahmer – Monster: The Jeffrey Dahmer Story in which him and his son were portrayed by Richard Jenkins and Evan Peters respectively.

Dahmer lived in Seville, Ohio, in his later years. His first wife, Joyce, died of breast cancer in 2000 at the age of 64, and his second wife, Shari, died on January 13, 2023, at the age of 81.

Lionel Dahmer died from a heart attack on December 5, 2023, at a hospice care facility in Medina, Ohio. He was 87.
