= Friendsville =

Friendsville can refer to a location in the United States:

- Friendsville, Illinois
- Friendsville, Maryland
- Friendsville, Ohio
- Friendsville, Pennsylvania
- Friendsville, Tennessee

== See also ==
- Friendville (disambiguation)
