= Crawford Corners =

Crawford Corners may refer to:

- Crawford Corners, New Jersey
- Crawford Corners, Ohio
