= Lois Youngen =

- Pitcher / Outfielder
- Born: October 23, 1933 (age 92); Westfield Center, Ohio, U.S.
- Bats: Right Throws: Right

Teams
- Kenosha Comets (1951); Fort Wayne Daisies (1952); South Bend Blue Sox (1953); Fort Wayne Daisies (1954); South Bend Blue Sox (1954)

Lois Joy Youngen (born October 23, 1933) is a former catcher and outfielder who played from 1951 through 1954 in the All-American Girls Professional Baseball League (AAGPBL). Listed at 5 ft 4 in (1.63 m), 137 lb, she batted and threw right-handed. Following her baseball career, she worked as a physical education instructor for more than 30 years.

== Early life ==
Born in Westfield Center, Ohio, Youngen grew up dreaming of being a ballplayer while admiring the Cleveland Indians major league team, and her interest in sports increased as she got older. It was in the years before Little League Baseball allowed girls to play. Her father, who had pitched for the Kent State University team in the 1920s, was also an avid baseball fanatic and encouraged Lois by teaching her how to swing and catch, while she accustomed to play sandlot ball with the neighborhood kids. As a teenager, Lois had the opportunity to play for a softball team in the nearby city of Ashland, where she gained the attention of a AAGPBL scout who signed her to a contract to play in the league.

== AAGPBL career ==
Youngen entered the AAGPBL in 1951 with the Kenosha Comets, playing for them one year before joining the Fort Wayne Daisies in 1952. Then she opened 1953 with the South Bend Blue Sox, returned to Fort Wayne for the first half of the 1954 season and rejoined South Bend during the midseason. While catching for South Bend, Youngen caught a perfect game pitched by Jean Faut against the Kalamazoo Lassies on September 3, 1953. Her best season at the plate came in 1954, when she hit a combined average of .284 (59-for-208) in 65 games, driving in 35 runs while scoring 27 times. In a four-season career, Youngen hit .255 (83-for-425) with 39 runs and 44 RBI in 116 games.

== Bill Allington All-Stars ==
Once the league disbanded in 1954, Youngen played one year for a national touring team known as the All-Americans. The team, led by former Daisies manager Bill Allington, included selected AAGPBL players as Joan Berger, Gloria Cordes, Gertrude Dunn, Betty Foss, Jean Geissinger, Katie Horstman, Maxine Kline, Dolores Lee, Ruth Richard, Dorothy Schroeder and Joanne Weaver, among others. The Allington All-Stars played 100 games between 1954 and 1958, each booked in a different town, against male teams, while traveling over 10,000 miles in the manager's station wagon and a Ford Country Sedan.

== Teaching career ==
Youngen completed her education while playing in the AAGPBL. She earned her bachelor's degree in physical education from Kent State University in 1955 and later earned a master's degree in physical education from Michigan State University. In 1960 Youngen joined the University of Oregon, where she became an emeritus professor of physical education.

Since 1988 Youngen has been part of Women in Baseball, a permanent display based at the Baseball Hall of Fame and Museum in Cooperstown, New York, which was unveiled to honor the entire All-American Girls Professional Baseball League rather than individual baseball personalities. As of 2011, Youngen lived in Eugene, Oregon and remained active in the community with a passion for teaching.
