= Abbeyville, Ohio =

Unincorporated community in Ohio, U.S.

Coordinates: 41°11′50″N 81°53′12″W

Abbeyville is an unincorporated community in Medina County, in the U.S. state of Ohio.

== History ==
The first settlement at Abbeyville was made in 1831. A post office called Abbeyville was established in 1833, and remained in operation until 1902. Abbeyville was named after Abbey, the wife of a first settler.
