= C. V. Matteson =

American baseball player (1861–1931)

- Pitcher
- Born: November 24, 1861; Seville, Ohio
- Died: December 18, 1931 (aged 70); Seville, Ohio
- Batted: Unknown Threw: Unknown

MLB debut
- June 13, 1884, for the St. Louis Maroons

Last MLB appearance
- June 13, 1884, for the St. Louis Maroons

MLB statistics
- Games pitched: 1
- Win–loss record: 1–0
- Earned run average: 9.00
- Stats at Baseball Reference

Teams
- St. Louis Maroons (1884)

Clifford Virgil Matteson (November 24, 1861 – December 18, 1931) was an American professional baseball player who pitched one game in Major League Baseball for the 1884 St. Louis Maroons. The game took place on June 13, with Matteson starting the game as a pitcher. He pitched six innings, gave up nine hits, one of which was a home run, and gave up 11 runs, six of which were earned, and he earned the win because the Maroons won the game 16–11. After the sixth inning, he was moved to center field for the remainder of the game. Matteson later became the mayor of his hometown of Seville, Ohio where he died at the age of 70 due to acute indigestion, he is interred at Mound Hill Cemetery.
