= Bennetts Corners, Ohio =

Unincorporated community in Ohio, U.S.

Coordinates: 41°16′35″N 81°47′06″W

Bennetts Corners is an unincorporated community in Medina County, in the U.S. state of Ohio.

== History ==
A post office called Bennetts Corners was established in 1863, and remained in operation until 1904. The community was named for one Mr. Bennett, an early settler.
