= Friendville =

Friendville may refer to:

- Friendville (manor house), a manor house and estate in the Mannofield area of Aberdeen, Scotland
- Friendville (album), a 2016 album by Jarrod Alonge

== See also ==
- Friendsville (disambiguation)
