= Roscoe Wilfred Thatcher =

American agriculturalist

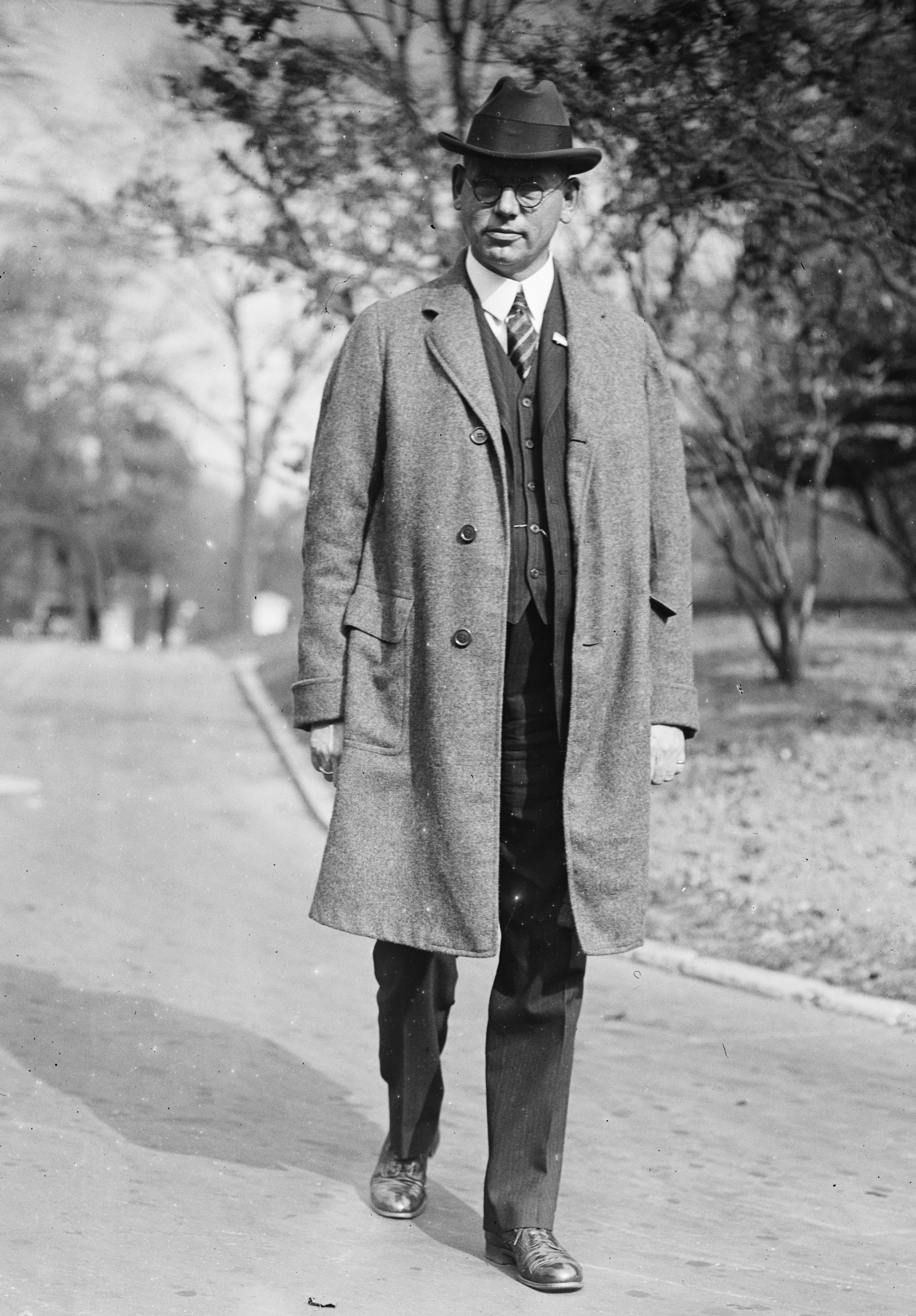
Thatcher in 1924

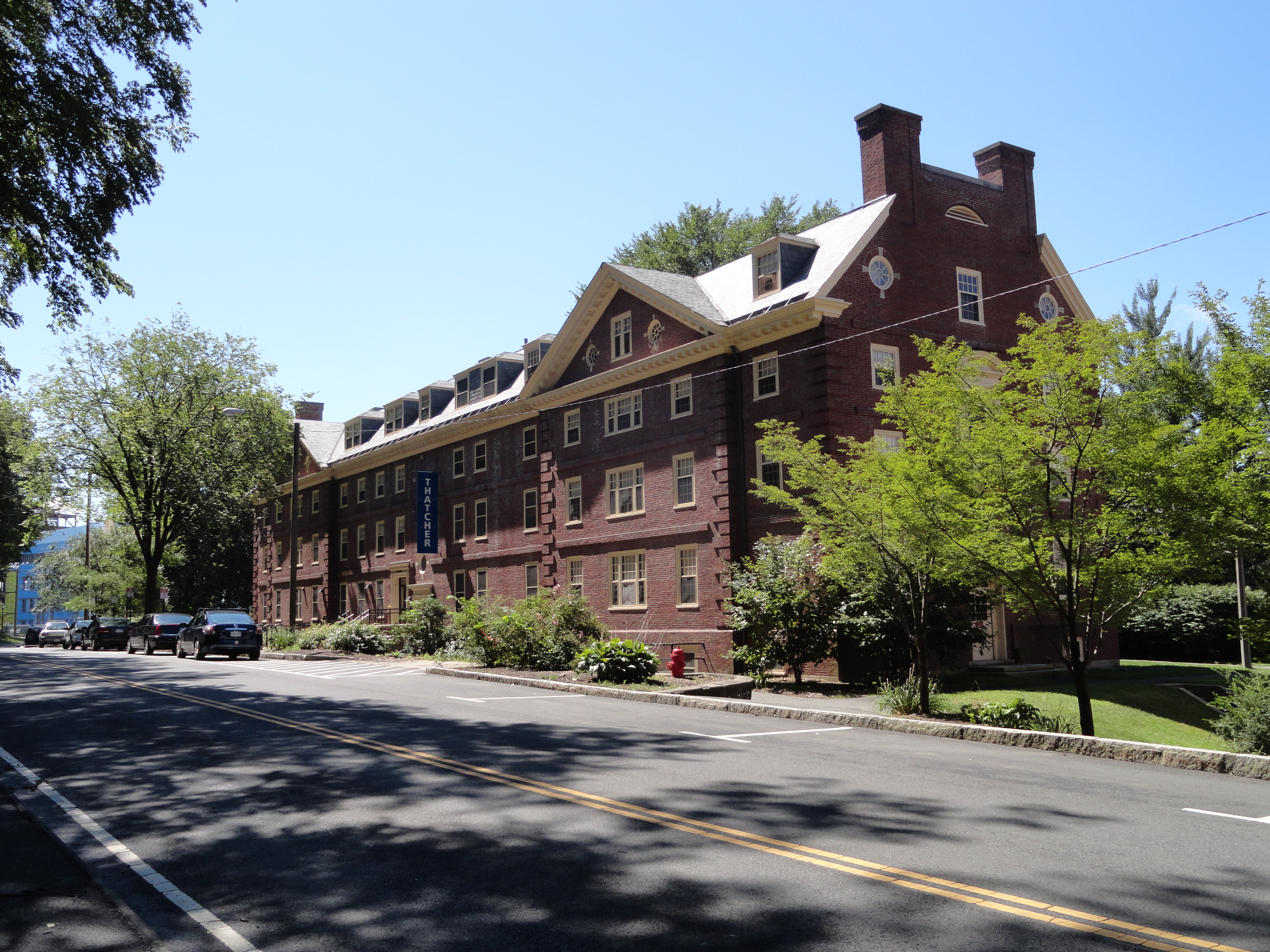
Roscoe W. Thatcher House at University of Massachusetts Amherst

Roscoe Wilfred Thatcher (c. 1872 − 6 December 1933) was an American agriculturist. He was born and raised on a farm in Chatham Center, Ohio, and studied at the University of Nebraska. He began his academic career at Washington State College, becoming head of the Department of Agriculture there.

== Biography ==
Thatcher moved to the University of Minnesota in 1913, initially as head of the Department of Chemistry, and later as Dean of the Department of Agriculture.

In 1921 he became director of the New York State Agricultural Experiment Station, and that year published a book, Chemistry of Plant Life.

Thatcher left New York to become the first president of Massachusetts State College, the new name for the Massachusetts Agricultural College.

Thatcher was known for his studies of the chemistry of flour, and the chemistry of insecticides. In 1924 President Coolidge appointed him to the president's Agricultural Commission. He died of a cerebral hemorrhage on 6 December 1933.

A dormitory at UMass Amherst designed by architect Louis W. Ross was named after Thatcher, Roscoe W. Thatcher House. The dormitory design was deemed so successful, it won a medal.

== Works ==
- The Chemistry of Plant Life. New York: McGraw-Hill, 1921.
