= Universalist Church of Westfield Center =

Historic church in Ohio, United States

- U.S. National Register of Historic Places
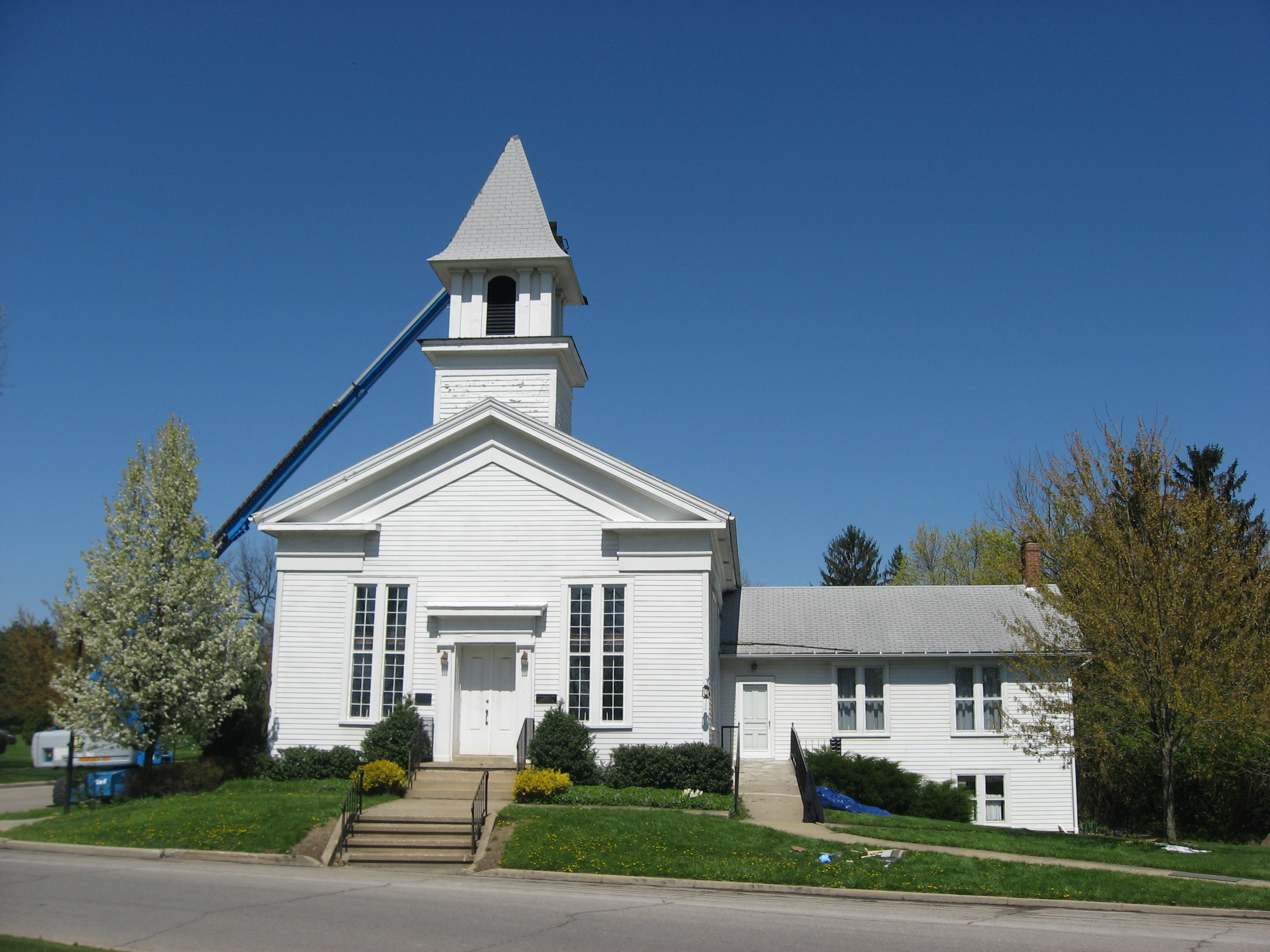
- Front of the church

- Location within Ohio Location within the United States
- Location: LeRoy and Greenwich Rds., Westfield Center, Ohio
- Coordinates: 41°1′39″N 81°55′59″W
- Area: 0.5 acres (0.20 ha)
- Built: 1849
- Architectural style: Greek Revival, Stick/eastlake
- NRHP reference No.: 78002135
- Added to NRHP: November 29, 1978

The Universalist Church of Westfield Center is a historic church in Westfield Center, Ohio, United States. One of Ohio's oldest Universalist congregations, it has experienced a generally peaceful history since its establishment in the 1830s. Located on the village green, the congregation's church building has been named a historic site.

== Organic history ==
Ninety Universalists organized their church in May 1839, holding their first worship services and business meetings in the Baptist church and the local schoolhouse; they were the second Universalist church organized anywhere in Ohio. In 1847, they paid $60 to purchase a piece of land on the public square in Westfield Center; one year later, the building operations began, and the dedication occurred on 16 June 1849. Comparatively few interpersonal difficulties appear in the church records; a schism occurred in 1853, but few members left, and the congregation was little affected. The original building remains in use, although expanded. Today, the congregation is a member of the Unitarian Universalist Association.

== Architecture ==
The congregation's church building is a weatherboarded structure with a foundation of stucco. Its main portion consists of a symmetrical gabled structure with a partial pediment, topped with a rectangular tower with a steep pyramidal roof. Double windows are placed on each side of the trabeated entryway. Despite the modifications of the late 19th and early 20th centuries, the church retains much of its original Greek Revival appearance, including its general simplicity and symmetry, as well as individual elements such as pilasters and the belfry. Constructed in the late 19th century, the side addition features the substantially different architecture of the Stick style, but in a way that fits well with the original section of the church.

== Preservation ==
In 1978, the Universalist Church was listed on the National Register of Historic Places, qualifying both because of its architecture and its significant place in local history. As a longtime community landmark, it is one of 28 locations in Medina County on the Register, and the only one in Westfield Center.
