= Coddingville, Ohio =

Unincorporated community in Ohio, U.S.

Coordinates: 41°08′12″N 81°42′18″W

Coddingville is an unincorporated community in Medina County, in the U.S. state of Ohio.

== History ==
The first settlement at Coddingville was made in 1817. The community was named for Burt Codding, one of the pioneer settlers. A post office called Coddingville was established in 1850, and remained in operation until 1865.
