= Remsen Corners, Ohio =

Unincorporated community in Ohio, U.S.

Coordinates: 41°11′19″N 81°44′30″W

Remsen Corners (also spelled Remson Corners) is an unincorporated community in Medina County, in the U.S. state of Ohio.

== History ==
A post office called Remson's Corners was established in 1855, and remained in operation until 1902. Remson was the name of an early land speculator from New York who purchased the land soon after division by the Connecticut Land Company.
