= Martin Van Buren Bates =

American with gigantism (1837–1919)

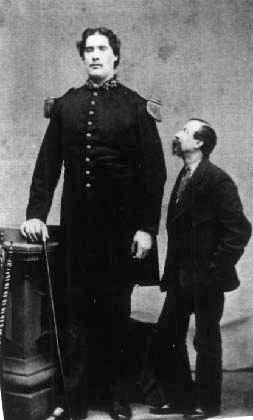
- Bates standing in uniform
- Born: November 9, 1837; Letcher County, Kentucky, U.S.
- Died: January 7, 1919 (aged 81); Seville, Ohio, U.S.
- Height: 7 ft 4 in (2.24 m)
- Spouses: Anna Haining Swan (m. 1871; died 1888) Annette LaVonne Weatherby (m. 1889)

Martin Van Buren Bates (November 9, 1837 – January 19, 1919), known as the Kentucky Giant, was an American man famous for his great height. He was 7 ft 4 in (2.24 m) tall and weighed 380 lb (170 kg).

== Youth and growth ==
Bates' growth rate jumped at the age of six or seven. At age 12 he was over 6 ft (1.83 m) tall and weighed over 200 lb (90 kg).

== American Civil War ==
Bates was attending university in Virginia when the American Civil War broke out. He subsequently joined the 5th Kentucky Infantry Confederate States Army, later becoming a lieutenant and then captain. He was severely wounded in a battle near the Cumberland Gap and was captured and imprisoned at Camp Chase in Ohio, although he later escaped.

== Adulthood and first marriage ==
He returned to Kentucky after the war. Before the war, his first occupation was as a schoolteacher. While the circus was on tour in Halifax, Canada, the 7 ft 6 in (2.29 m) tall Anna Haining Swan visited. She and Martin soon got to know each other, and were married in 1871. The highly publicized wedding, at St Martin-in-the-Fields in London drew thousands of people trying to attend, due to both the uncommonness of the spectacle and the couple's disarming good nature. Queen Victoria gave Bates an engraved watch, and gave Swan a satin gown and diamond ring.

They moved to Ohio in 1872, settling in Seville in Medina County. On May 19, 1872, Anna gave birth to a daughter, who weighed 18 lb (8.2 kg) and died at birth. They built a large house to accommodate themselves comfortably. Martin described the next few years in his autobiography:

While in Ohio, I purchased a farm in Seville, Medina County. It consisted of 130 acres [0.53 km^{2}; 53 ha] of good land. I built a house upon it designed especially for our comfort. The furniture was all built to order and to see our guests make use of it recalls most forcibly the good Dean Swift's traveler in the land of Brobdingnag.

I had determined to become a farmer, so I stocked my farm with the best breeds of cattle, most of them being short horns. My draught horses are of the Norman breed.

My rest was not to last long, for the solicitations of managers, I consented to again travel. The seasons of 1878, 1879 and 1880 found us leading attractions of the W. W. Cole circus.

While we have during these years been blessed with many things, affliction again visited us in the loss of a boy, born on the 15th day of January 1879. He was 28 inches [71 cm] tall and weighed twenty-three pounds [10 kg] and was perfect in every respect.

== Final years ==
Anna Bates died on August 5, 1888. Martin ordered a statue of her from Europe for her grave, sold the oversized house, and moved into the town. In 1889 he remarried, this time to a woman of typical stature, Annette LaVonne Weatherby, and lived a mostly peaceful life until his death in 1919 of nephritis. He was buried beside his first wife and their son in Seville. He is one of the tallest known people to live to at least 80 years.

Some years after his death, a family of typical heights had purchased the 14-ft ceiling home built by the giant couple. However, the original house in which he and Anna lived burned down. Later a standard house was built on that site and eventually converted into a museum for the Seville Historical Society.

== Gallery ==
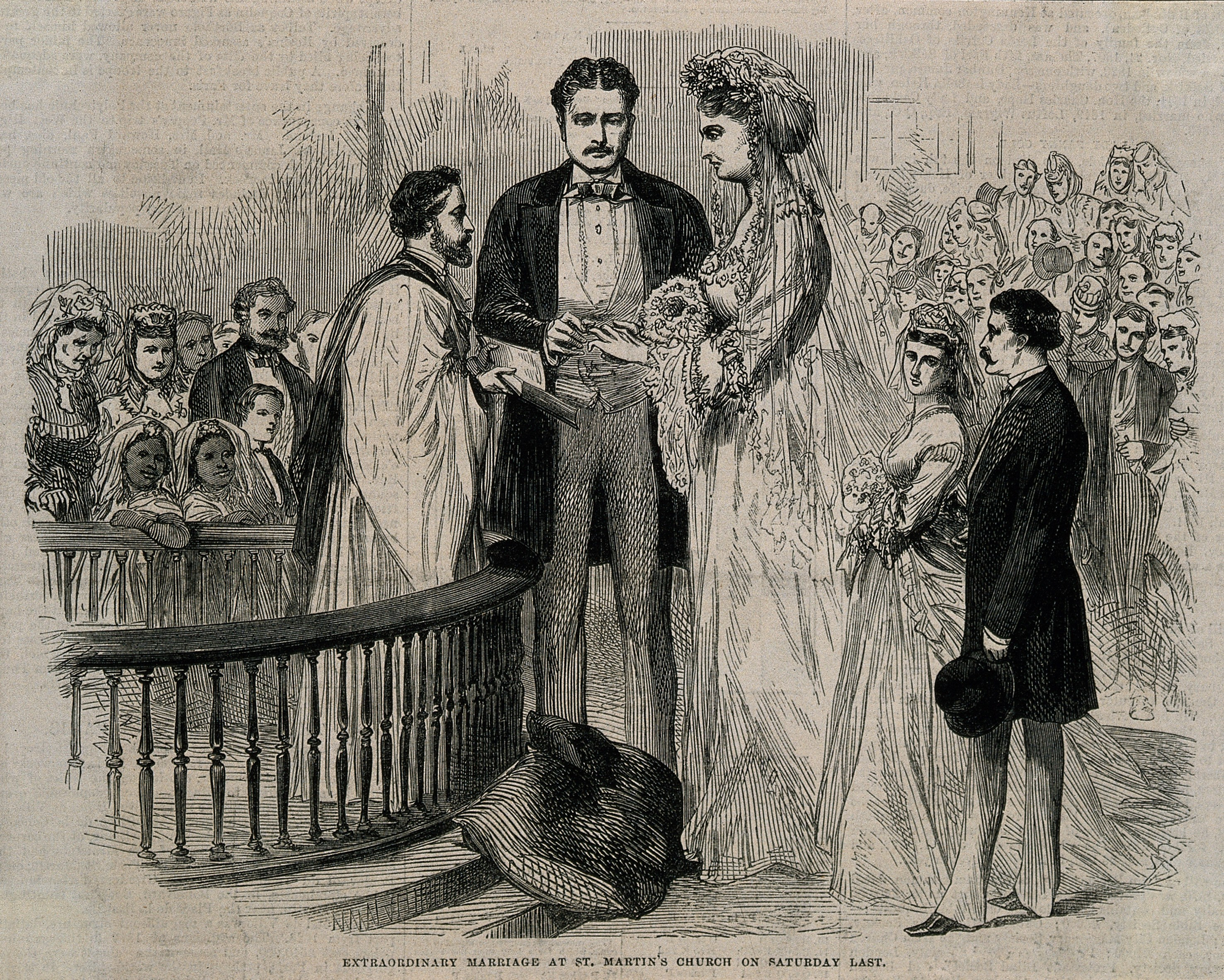
The marriage of Martin Bates to Anna Swan, 1871

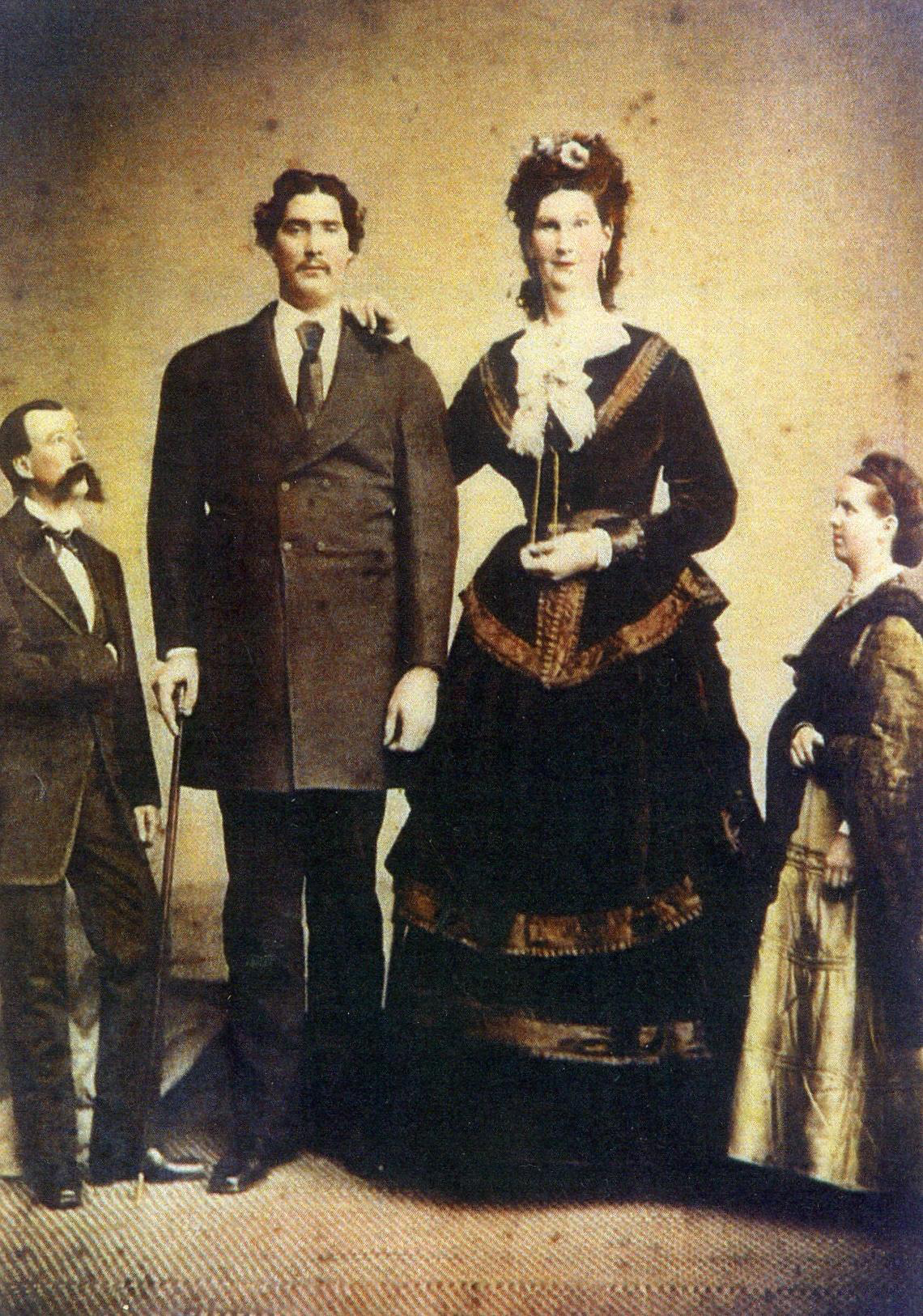
Martin van Buren Bates and Anna Haining Bates

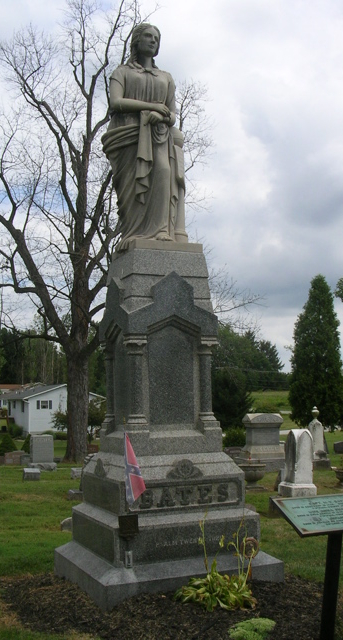
Bates family grave, Seville, Ohio

== See also ==
- List of tallest people
