= Westfield Insurance =

American insurance company

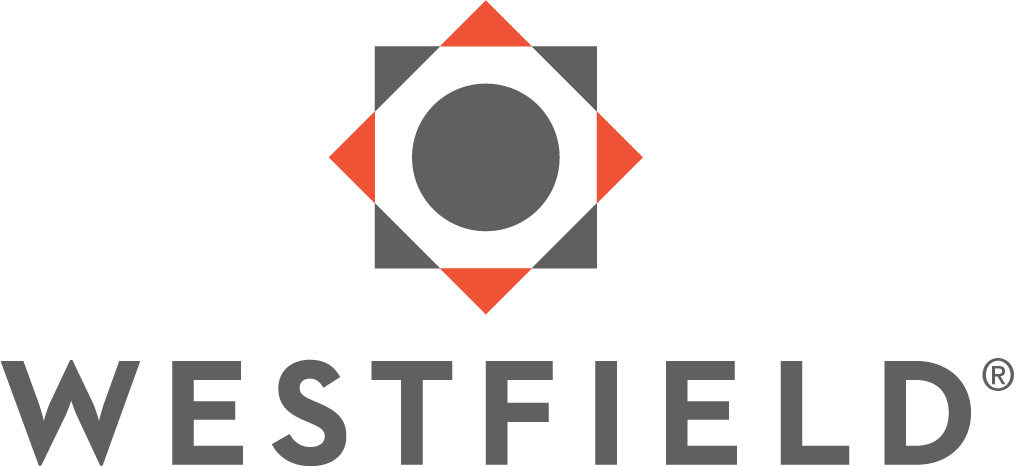
- Type: Privately held
- Industry: Finance and insurance
- Founded: 1848
- Headquarters: Westfield Center, Ohio
- Key people: Ed Largent (CEO); Joe Kohmannn (COO); Rob Looney (CFO)
- Revenue: $1.9 billion USD (2015)
- Number of employees: 2,400
- Website: westfieldinsurance.com

Westfield Insurance, the primary subsidiary of Westfield Group, is a multi-line provider of property and casualty insurance including personal lines insurance (includes auto, home, and boats, etc.), commercial (small business, middle market, agribusiness insurance, and surety bonds), and specialty.

== History ==
Westfield began as Ohio Farmers Insurance Company in 1848 when a group of farmers joined forces to insure their properties.

In June 2025, Ohio Farmers Insurance Company announced plans to sell Westfield Bancorp to First Financial Bancorp. The $2.2 billion sale was complete in November 2025.

=== Operations ===
Based in Westfield Center, Ohio, the company employs over 2,500 nationwide, including 1,700 in its home office, making it the largest employer in Medina County. Westfield's products are distributed through a network of more than 1,000 independent insurance agents.

In 2023, Westfield acquired Lloyd's of London Syndicate 1200.

In 2025, Westfield Insurance introduced an inland flood coverage add-on to help homeowners outside traditional high-risk flood zones mitigate financial losses from flash floods. Additionally, the company donated to the Center for Disaster Philanthropy, with total contributions of over $3.5 million since 2016 to support flood recovery and mitigation efforts.

=== Facilities ===
In addition to Westfield's home office, the Blair Center Conference Center, Westfield Bank, and a private hotel called Westfield Inn are also located on the company grounds in Westfield Center. The company also owns the Westfield Country Club, a 36-hole championship golf course that hosted the Junior PGA Championship until 2007.
