= Erhart, Ohio =

Unincorporated community in Ohio, U.S.

Coordinates: 41°11′59″N 81°58′28″W

Erhart is an unincorporated community in Medina County, in the U.S. state of Ohio.

== History ==
A post office was established at Erhart in 1873, and remained in operation until 1943.
