= A Father's Story =

1994 book by Lionel Dahmer

- Author: Lionel Dahmer
- Language: English
- Publisher: William Morrow and Company
- Publication date: March 1994
- Publication place: United States
- Pages: 255
- ISBN: 978-0-688-12156-3

A Father's Story is a memoir written by Lionel Dahmer, father of American serial killer Jeffrey Dahmer. The book was published in 1994 by William Morrow and Company.

== Background ==
Lionel Dahmer used most of the proceeds from the book to cover legal fees. He was sued by two victims' families for using their names in the book without obtaining prior consent. He had also previously been sued by the family of victim Steven Hicks in 1992. They filed a wrongful death suit against Dahmer, his wife Shari Dahmer, and his former wife Joyce Flint, citing parental negligence as the basis of the claim.

Dahmer donated the remaining portion of the proceeds to the victims' families.

Dahmer and his wife Shari received support from Theresa Smith, sister of victim Eddie Smith, who is mentioned in the acknowledgments. "If anyone has a right to write a book, it's them [Jeffrey's parents] and the families [of the victims]. If that was my brother and my brother killed their son, I would not abandon my brother," Smith said.

== Synopsis ==
In July 1991, research chemist Lionel Dahmer was informed by the Milwaukee Police Department that they were investigating a homicide involving his son, Jeffrey. Dahmer initially thought Jeffrey was a murder victim, not a murderer. He learned the grisly details of his son's crimes during the trial before which his son was found to be legally sane and subsequently sentenced to life imprisonment in February 1992.

A Father's Story runs chronologically from Jeffrey's birth until his arrest and imprisonment. Dahmer tries to figure out what made his son commit murder, practice necrophilia and cannibalism. He scrutinizes every possible contributing factor to his son's psychosis starting with himself. Dahmer judges himself a poor father because he was emotionally distant from his son. While reflecting, he "speculates that his own youthful shyness, fascination with bombs and fears of abandonment added up to a monstrous genetic inheritance."

== Critical reception ==
Rank Rich wrote for The New York Times: "Jeffrey Dahmer remains a phantom, defying logic. ... Mr. Dahmer's story is terrifying precisely because his blindness to his son's insanity was inseparable from his love for him."

Jonathan Kirsch wrote in his review for the Los Angeles Times: "'A Father's Story' is really more about Lionel Dahmer than his son, a heartfelt effort at self-analysis and self-revelation by a bewildered father forced to accept that his son is a serial murderer: Where did I go wrong?"

Publishers Weekly stated that A Father's Story is "a book for criminologists, psychiatrists and the ghoulish."

== Re-release ==
After Jeffrey was killed in prison by another inmate in November 1994, Dahmer wrote an additional chapter on the death of his son. The new edition was published by Avon Books.
