= Beebetown, Ohio =

Beebetown, Medina County, Ohio
- Unincorporated community
- Location within Ohio Location within the United States
- Coordinates: 41°16′29″N 81°52′41″W
- Country: United States
- State: Ohio
- County: Medina
- Townships: Brunswick Hills, Liverpool
- Elevation: 938 ft (286 m)
- Time zone: UTC-5 (Eastern (EST))
  - Summer (DST): EDT
- ZIP Code: 44212 (Brunswick)
- GNIS ID: 1048506

Beebetown is an unincorporated community in Medina County, Ohio.

== Name and history ==
In 1823, Abram Beebe, for whom the place was named, brought his wife Dorcas and nine children from Canandaigua, New York with an ox team. He purchased fifty acres on the Liverpool corner for $165.50 and built a log house.

The Fullers purchased the Strongsville corner of the area and found on it a hut which had been built by hunters. It had no fireplace or chimney but they managed to live in it the first winter. The following summer, the Fullers built the first frame house in Beebetown. Mrs. Fuller, eager to start an orchard for the family, had brought seeds and clippings from New York State. A pear tree grew from one of these. Part of it, 140 years old, still stands.

Historic sites include the Beebetown schoolhouse (now a residence), cemetery, and Beebetown Baptist Church, originally built in 1852, after a two-story log building (circa 1838) on the site was no longer suitable. Several houses within the township also date back to the 1800s.
