= Medina County, County Commission =

County Commission of Medina Ohio

Medina County Commissioners
- Medina, Ohio County Commission

History
- New session started: January 1, 2019

Leadership
- President of the Board: Colleen M. Swedyk (R) since January 1, 2019
- Vice President of Board: William Hutson (R) since January 2, 2018

Structure
- Seats: 3
- Political groups: Republican (3)
- Length of term: 4 years
- Salary: $70,000/year

Website
- www.medinaco.org

The Ohio County Commission is the legislature of Medina County, Ohio. Located in Medina, Ohio, the commission represents approximately 179,746 people. The current president of the board is Colleen M. Swedyk. The commission currently consists of three Republicans.

Board members have 4-year terms, being elected in a staggered fashion every four years; the president of the board was elected in 2018, whereas the vice president of the board and the other members of the board were elected in 2016.
