= Pawnee, Ohio =

Unincorporated community in Ohio, U.S.

Coordinates: 41°04′03″N 82°04′37″W

Pawnee is an unincorporated community in Medina County, in the U.S. state of Ohio.

== History ==
Pawnee was originally called Esselburn's Corners, after Louis Esselburn, who started a general store there in 1872. A post office called Pawnee was established in 1879, and remained in operation until 1887.
