= Chatham, Medina County, Ohio =

Unincorporated community in Ohio, U.S.

Coordinates: 41°05′58″N 82°01′28″W

Chatham /ˈtʃætəm/ is an unincorporated community in Medina County, in the U.S. state of Ohio.

== History ==
Chatham was laid out in the 1830s, and named after Chatham, New York, the native home of a share of the first settlers. A variant name was Chatham Center. A post office called Chatham Centre was established in 1837, the name was changed to Chatham Center in 1893, and the post office closed in 1895. Besides the post office, Chatham had a country store, which opened around 1840.

== Notable residents ==
- Roscoe Wilfred Thatcher
