= Friendsville, Ohio =

Unincorporated community in Ohio, U.S.

Coordinates: 41°01′38″N 81°57′57″W

Friendsville is an unincorporated community in Medina County, in the U.S. state of Ohio.

== History ==
The community was named for the fact a large share of the early settlers were Quakers (Friends). A former variant name was Winstons Corners, for Joseph S. Winston, the original owner of the town site. A post office called Friendsville was established in 1867, and remained in operation until 1901.
