= Gloria Glens Park, Ohio =

- Village
- Village of Gloria Glens
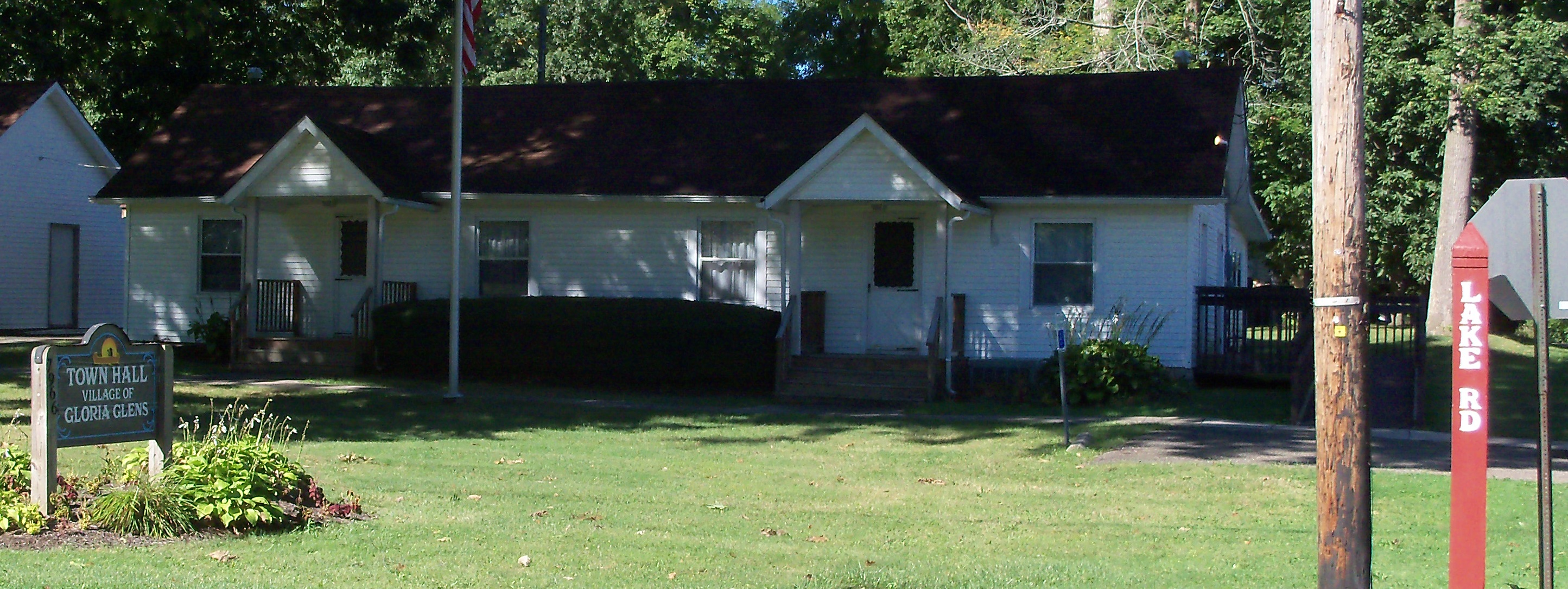
- Town Hall, village of Gloria Glens

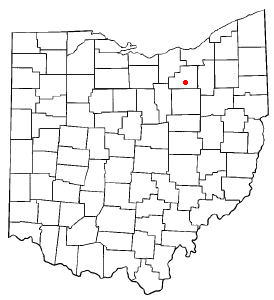
- Location of Gloria Glens Park, Ohio

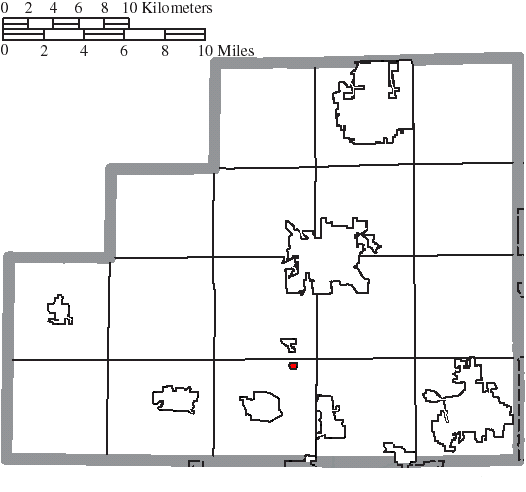
- Location of Gloria Glens Park in Medina County
- Coordinates: 41°03′28″N 81°54′04″W
- Country: United States
- State: Ohio
- County: Medina
- Established: 1924

Government
  - Type: Village Council

Area
  - Total: 0.11 sq mi (0.29 km^{2})
  - Land: 0.11 sq mi (0.28 km^{2})
  - Water: 0.0039 sq mi (0.01 km^{2})
- Elevation: 1,011 ft (308 m)

Population (2020)
  - Total: 369
  - Estimate (2023): 373
  - Density: 3,442.7/sq mi (1,329.24/km^{2})
- Time zone: UTC-5 (Eastern (EST))
  - Summer (DST): UTC-4 (EDT)
- FIPS code: 39-30660
- GNIS feature ID: 2398981
- Website: www.gloriaglens.org

Gloria Glens Park is a village in Medina County, Ohio, United States. The population was 369 at the 2020 census.

== Geography ==
According to the United States Census Bureau, the village has a total area of 0.12 square miles (0.31 km^{2}), of which 0.11 square miles (0.28 km^{2}) is land and 0.01 square miles (0.03 km^{2}) is water.

== Demographics ==
Historical population
Census	Pop.	Note	%±
1940	6		—
1950	98		1,533.3%
1960	234		138.8%
1970	332		41.9%
1980	435		31.0%
1990	446		2.5%
2000	538		20.6%
2010	425		−21.0%
2020	369		−13.2%
2023 (est.)	373	▲	1.1%
U.S. Decennial Census

=== 2010 census ===
As of the census of 2010, there were 425 people, 179 households, and 116 families living in the village. The population density was 3,863.6 inhabitants per square mile (1,491.7/km^{2}). There were 226 housing units at an average density of 2,054.5 per square mile (793.2/km^{2}). The racial makeup of the village was 98.6% White, 0.2% African American, 0.2% Native American, 0.5% Asian, and 0.5% from two or more races. Hispanic or Latino of any race were 1.4% of the population.

There were 179 households, of which 29.1% had children under the age of 18 living with them, 48.6% were married couples living together, 11.7% had a female householder with no husband present, 4.5% had a male householder with no wife present, and 35.2% were non-families. 29.1% of all households were made up of individuals, and 8.4% had someone living alone who was 65 years of age or older. The average household size was 2.37 and the average family size was 2.91.

The median age in the village was 39.5 years. 22.4% of residents were under the age of 18; 8.9% were between the ages of 18 and 24; 27.8% were from 25 to 44; 29.6% were from 45 to 64; and 11.3% were 65 years of age or older. The gender makeup of the village was 51.8% male and 48.2% female.

=== 2000 census ===
As of the census of 2000, there were 538 people, 199 households, and 147 families living in the village. The population density was 4,730.7 inhabitants per square mile (1,826.5/km^{2}). There were 241 housing units at an average density of 2,119.1 per square mile (818.2/km^{2}). The racial makeup of the village was 99.26% White, 0.19% Native American, 0.19% from other races, and 0.37% from two or more races. Hispanic or Latino of any race were 0.37% of the population.

There were 199 households, out of which 36.2% had children under the age of 18 living with them, 57.3% were married couples living together, 11.6% had a female householder with no husband present, and 26.1% were non-families. 20.1% of all households were made up of individuals, and 8.0% had someone living alone who was 65 years of age or older. The average household size was 2.70 and the average family size was 3.11.

In the village, the population was spread out, with 27.7% under the age of 18, 7.8% from 18 to 24, 32.9% from 25 to 44, 21.0% from 45 to 64, and 10.6% who were 65 years of age or older. The median age was 34 years. For every 100 females there were 108.5 males. For every 100 females age 18 and over, there were 99.5 males.

The median income for a household in the village was $46,750, and the median income for a family was $52,891. Males had a median income of $36,964 versus $22,321 for females. The per capita income for the village was $19,937. None of the families and 1.3% of the population were living below the poverty line, including no under eighteens and 3.0% of those over 64.

Climate data for Gloria Glens Park, Ohio
Month	Jan	Feb	Mar	Apr	May	Jun	Jul	Aug	Sep	Oct	Nov	Dec	Year
Mean daily maximum °F (°C)	33 (1)	35 (2)	46 (8)	59 (15)	69 (21)	78 (26)	82 (28)	80 (27)	75 (24)	62 (17)	48 (9)	37 (3)	59 (15)
Mean daily minimum °F (°C)	19 (−7)	19 (−7)	38 (3)	25 (−4)	44 (7)	53 (12)	59 (15)	57 (14)	50 (10)	41 (5)	32 (0)	23 (−5)	37 (3)
Average precipitation inches (mm)	2.6 (66)	2.1 (79)	3.0 (51)	3.4 (86)	3.6 (91)	3.8 (97)	3.9 (99)	3.2 (81)	3.2 (81)	2.5 (89)	2.9 (74)	2.6 (66)	36.9 (937)
Source: Weatherbase
