= Anna Haining Bates =

Canadian woman notable for her great height (1846–1888)

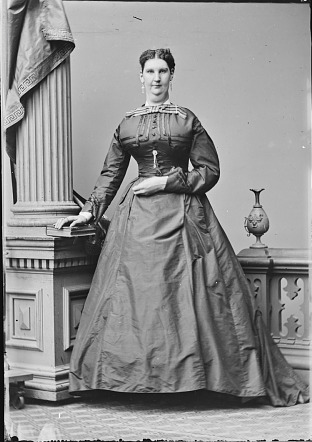
- Bates c. 1860-1870
- Born: Anna Haining Swan; August 6, 1846; Mill Brook, New Annan, Nova Scotia, Canada
- Died: August 5, 1888 (aged 41); Seville, Ohio, United States
- Occupation: Circus attraction
- Known for: Record height 7 feet 6 inches (2.29 m)
- Spouse: Martin Van Buren Bates (m. 1871)

Anna Haining Bates (née Swan; August 6, 1846 – August 5, 1888) was a Canadian woman notable for her great stature of 7 feet 6 inches (2.29 m). She was one of the tallest women who ever lived. Her parents were of average height and were Scottish immigrants.

== Early life ==
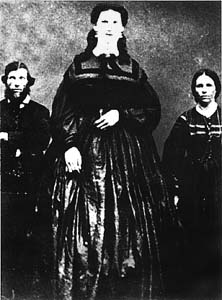
Swan (centre) with her parents, who were both of average height

Anna Haining Bates was born Anna Swan on August 6, 1846 at Mill Brook, New Annan, Nova Scotia.

At birth she weighed 13 pounds (5.90 kg). She was the third of 13 children, all of the others being around average height. From birth she grew very rapidly. Anna's mother recalled that her daughter's growth rate was "phenomenal."

On her fourth birthday, Swan was 4 feet 6 inches (137 centimetres) tall and weighed 94 pounds (42.64 kg). On her 6th birthday she was measured at 5 feet 2 inches (157.48 centimetres) tall, an inch or two (2.5–5 cm) shorter than her mother. On her 10th birthday she measured 6 feet 1 inch (185 cm) tall and weighed at 203 pounds (92.08 kg). On her 11th birthday, she was measured at 6 feet 4 inches (193.04 centimetres) tall. On her 15th birthday Swan was measured at 7 feet 0 inches (213.36 centimetres) tall. She reached her full height three years later. Her feet were 14.2 inches (36 cm) long.

Swan excelled at literature and music and was considered to be very intelligent. She also excelled at her studies of acting, piano and voice. On one occasion she played Lady Macbeth.

== Career ==
At the age of 16, in 1863, Anna Swan came to the attention of American showman P. T. Barnum, who sent an agent to her family's home in New Annan, Nova Scotia. Barnum offered Swan $1,000 a month to appear at Barnum's American Museum in New York City. Because she wished to continue her education, Swan accepted after Barnum promised to provide a private tutor for three hours each day for three years. While appearing at the museum, she continued her studies and received instruction in voice and piano.

Barnum advertised Swan as "the tallest girl in the world", claiming that she stood 8 feet 1 inch (2.46 m) tall. He dressed her in elaborate costumes made from 100 yards (91 m) of satin and 50 yards (46 m) of lace, and frequently exhibited her alongside Commodore Nutt, whose much smaller stature highlighted the contrast between the two performers. Barnum later described Swan as "an intelligent and by no means ill-looking girl" and recalled that thousands of people visited her during her years at the museum.

On July 13, 1865, at the age of 18, Swan narrowly escaped death when Barnum's American Museum was destroyed by fire. Trapped on the third floor, she was lowered to the ground by 18 men using a block and tackle. Following the fire, Swan returned to New Annan to recover before resuming work at Barnum's new museum in New York. When that museum was also destroyed by fire in March 1868, at the age of 21, she again returned to Nova Scotia before resuming her exhibition career in the United States.

In 1871, at the age of 24, Swan travelled to Europe, where she and Martin Van Buren Bates gave command performances before Queen Victoria and the Prince of Wales following their marriage in London. Advertised as "the largest married couple in the world", they toured Europe together for 14 months before returning to North America.

After settling on a farm near Seville, Ohio, Swan continued to perform during the summer months with the W. W. Cole Circus. Following her final tour in 1880, at the age of 33, she retired permanently from public exhibition.

== Marriage and children ==
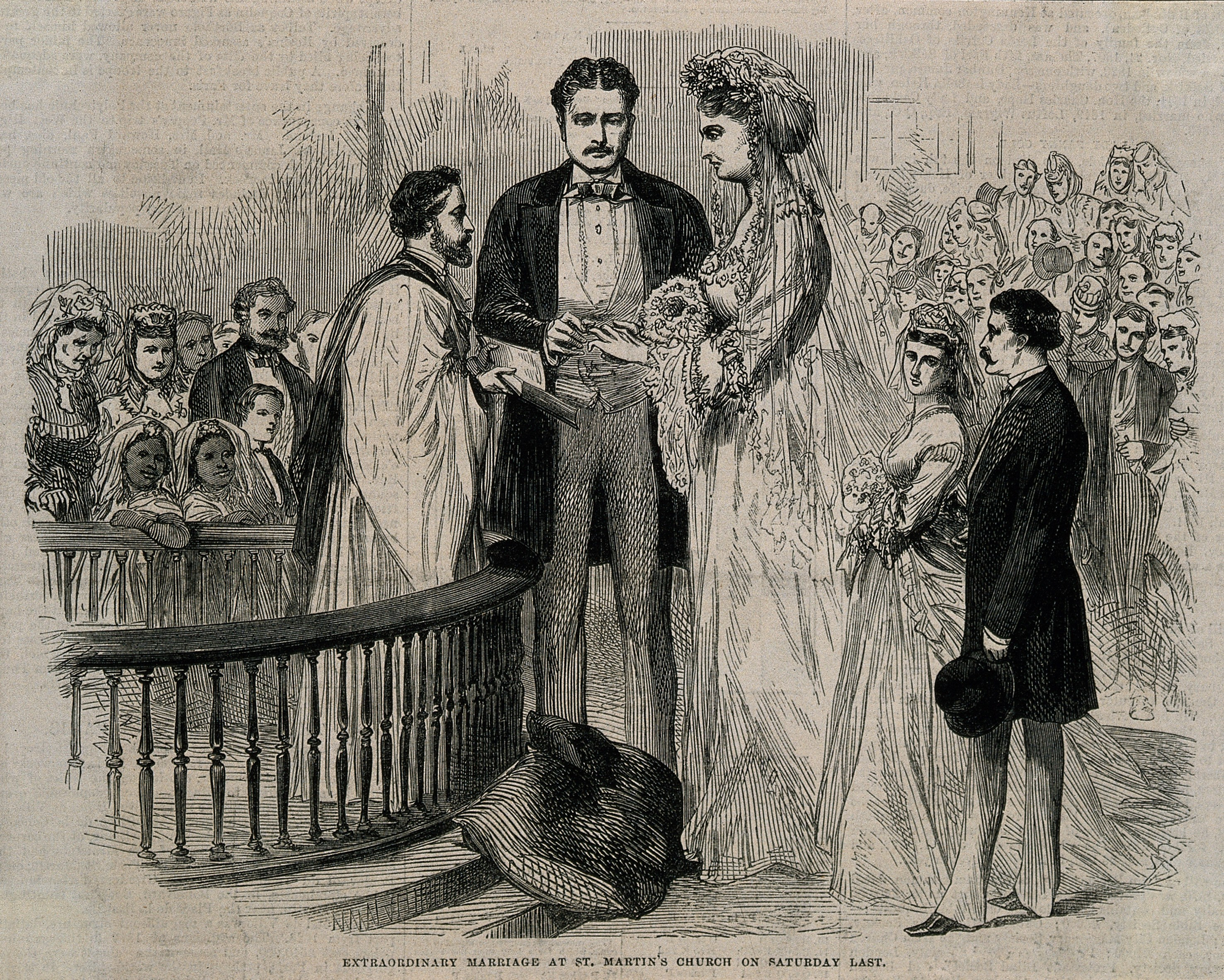
The marriage of Martin Bates to Anna Swan, 1871

In 1871, at the age of 24, while performing in Halifax, Nova Scotia, Swan met fellow performer Martin Van Buren Bates, who was appearing with another circus. A promoter recognized the public interest that the pair could generate and hired Swan on the spot to appear alongside him. As they toured Britain and North America, Swan and Bates grew close and eventually fell in love. They married on June 17, 1871, at St Martin-in-the-Fields in London, England. Queen Victoria marked the occasion by presenting Swan with a satin gown and diamond ring, while Bates received an engraved watch.

After their marriage, Swan and Bates started a family, but both of their children died in infancy. At the age of 25, Swan gave birth to a daughter on May 19, 1872. The baby weighed 18 pounds (8.2 kg) and was stillborn. Six years later while touring in 1878, Swan became pregnant again. On January 18, 1879, she gave birth to a son, known simply as "Babe". He weighed 22 pounds (10.0 kg), measured 28 inches (71 cm) long, and lived for 11 hours. The infant was later recognized by Guinness World Records as the heaviest and longest newborn ever recorded.

== Death ==
In 1888, at the age of 41, one day before her 42nd birthday, Anna Haining Bates died unexpectedly in her sleep at her home in Seville, Ohio.

Bates left an estate valued at $40,000, a substantial sum at the time. Some of her clothing and jewellery were distributed among her family. In the years after her death, descendants allowed several of her personal belongings to be displayed at the Sunrise Trail Museum in Tatamagouche, Nova Scotia, near her birthplace at Mill Brook.

== In Media ==
Sidura Ludwig's middle-grade novel-in-verse Swan is a fictionalized retelling of Bates' childhood in Nova Scotia.
