= Granger, Ohio =

Unincorporated community in Ohio, U.S.

Coordinates: 41°09′20″N 81°43′54″W

Granger is an unincorporated community in Medina County, in the U.S. state of Ohio.

== History ==
A post office called Granger was established in 1816, and remained in operation until 1901. Granger has the name of Gideon Granger, a member the Connecticut House of Representatives and 4th United States Postmaster General. A former variant name was Grangerburg.
