= Westfield Township, Medina County, Ohio =

Township in Ohio, US

- Township
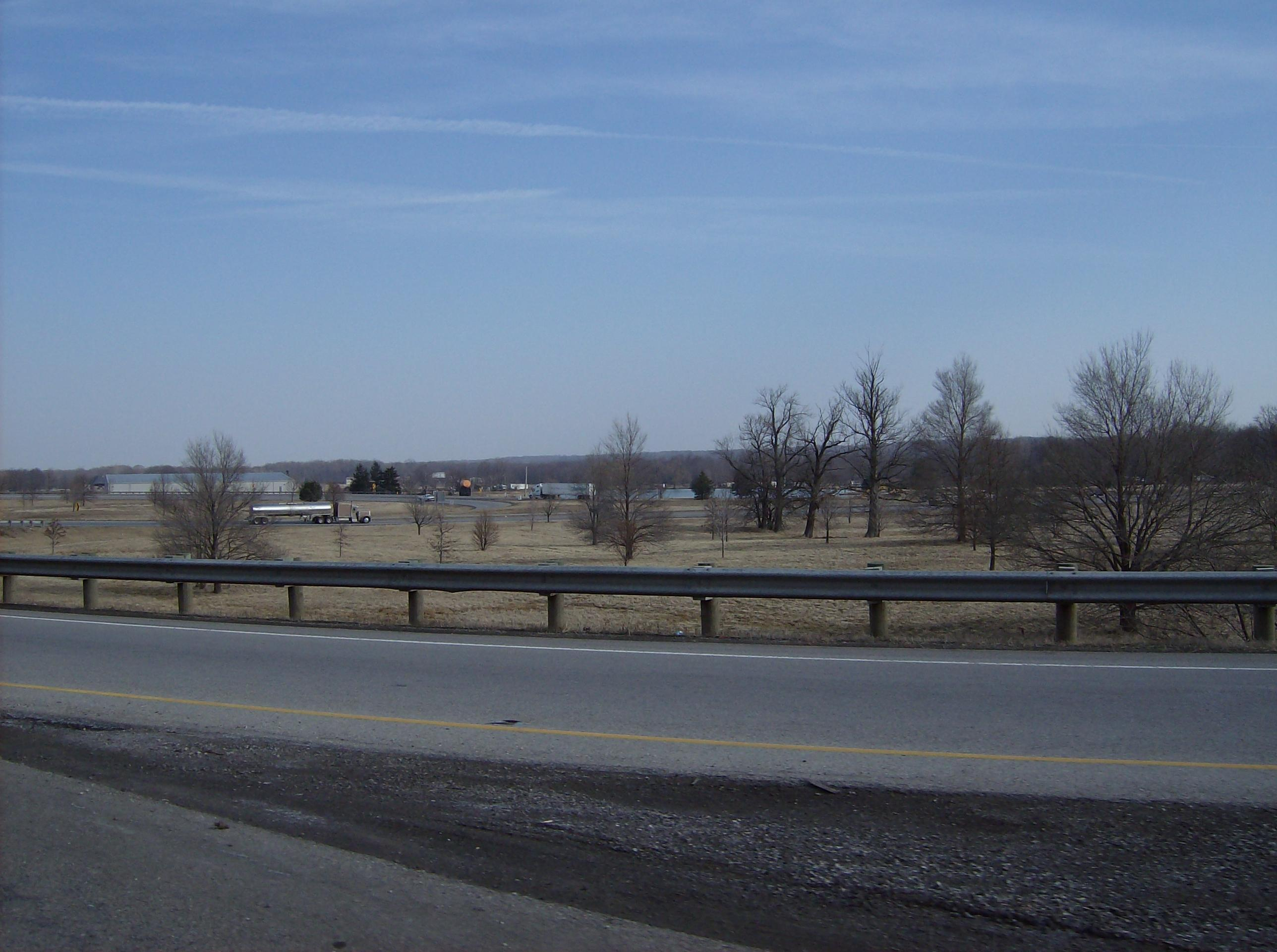
- The western end of the eastern half of Interstate 76 begins at an interchange in Westfield Township

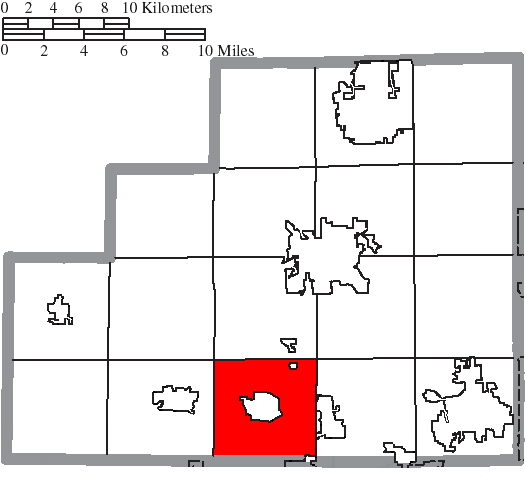
- Location of Westfield Township in Medina County
- Coordinates: 41°1′44″N 81°55′47″W
- Country: United States
- State: Ohio
- County: Medina

Area
  - Total: 25.5 sq mi (66.1 km^{2})
  - Land: 25.4 sq mi (65.8 km^{2})
  - Water: 0.15 sq mi (0.4 km^{2})
- Elevation: 1,020 ft (310 m)

Population (2020)
  - Total: 2,632
  - Density: 104/sq mi (40.0/km^{2})
- Time zone: UTC-5 (Eastern (EST))
  - Summer (DST): UTC-4 (EDT)
- FIPS code: 39-83426
- GNIS feature ID: 1086606

Westfield Township is one of the seventeen townships of Medina County, Ohio, United States. The 2020 census found 2,632 people in the township.

== Geography ==
Located in the southern part of the county, it borders the following townships:

- Lafayette Township - north
- Montville Township - northeast corner
- Guilford Township - east
- Milton Township, Wayne County - southeast corner
- Canaan Township, Wayne County - south
- Harrisville Township - west
- Chatham Township - northwest corner

Two villages are located in Westfield Township:

- Part of Creston, in the southeast
- Westfield Center, in the center

Westfield Township also surrounds the township and village of Gloria Glens Park in the northeast corner of the township.

== Name and history ==
Statewide, the only other Westfield Township is located in Morrow County.

== Government ==
The township is governed by a three-member board of trustees, who are elected in November of odd-numbered years to a four-year term beginning on the following January 1. Two are elected in the year after the presidential election and one is elected in the year before it. There is also an elected township fiscal officer, who serves a four-year term beginning on April 1 of the year after the election, which is held in November of the year before the presidential election. Vacancies in the fiscal officership or on the board of trustees are filled by the remaining trustees.
