= Medina County, Ohio =

County in the United States

- County
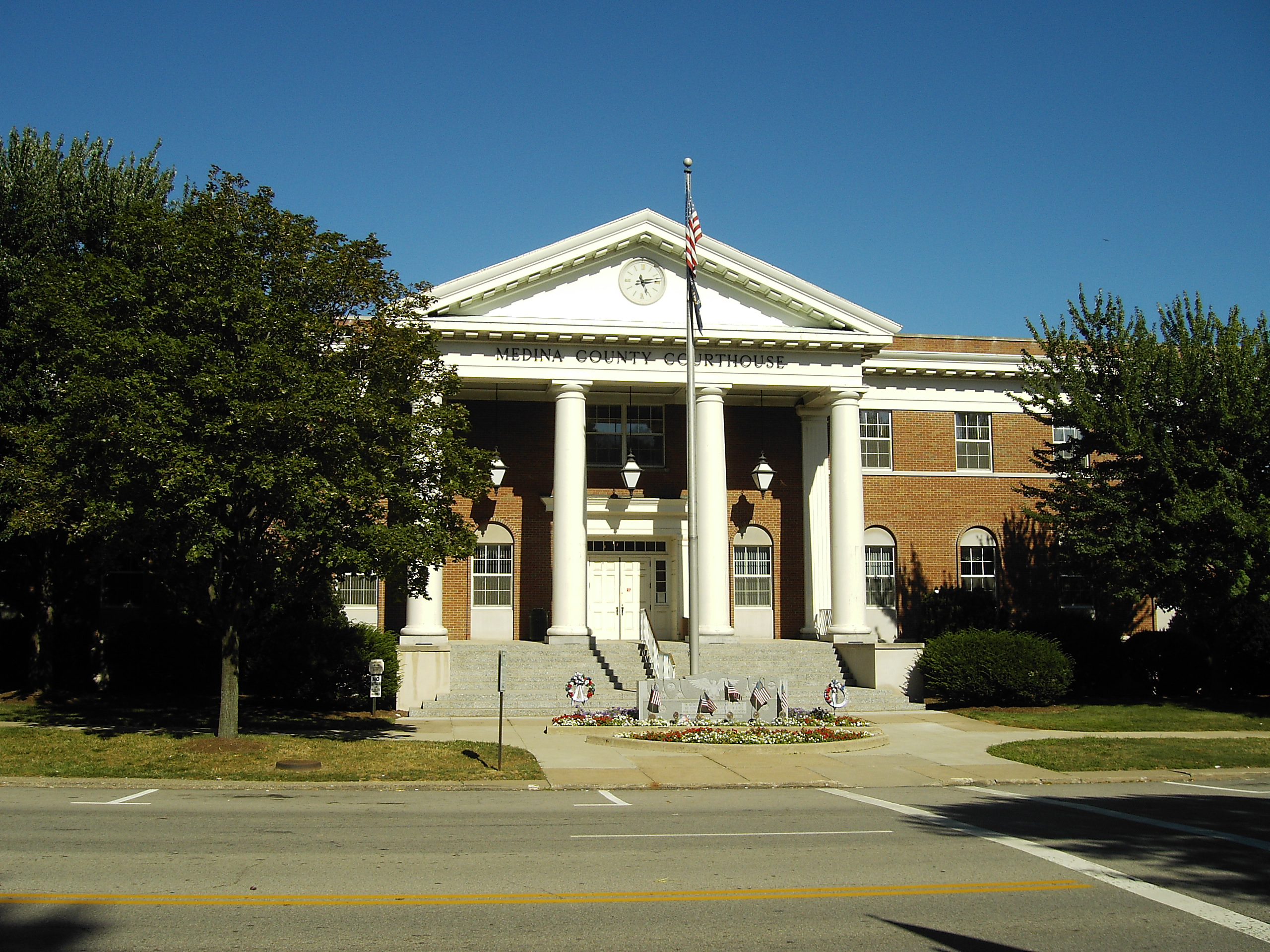
- Medina County Courthouse

- Flag Seal

- Location within the U.S. state of Ohio
- Coordinates: 41°07′N 81°54′W
- Country: United States
- State: Ohio
- Founded: 1812; 214 years ago (incorporated in 1818; 208 years ago)
- Named for: Medina, Saudi Arabia
- Seat: Medina
- Largest city: Brunswick

Government
  - County Commissioners: Aaron M. Harrison (Board President); Colleen M. Swedyk (Board Vice President); Stephen D. Hambley (Commissioner)

Area
  - Total: 423 sq mi (1,100 km^{2})
  - Land: 421.3 sq mi (1,091 km^{2})
  - Water: 1.7 sq mi (4.4 km^{2}) 0.4%

Population (2020)
  - Total: 182,470
  - Estimate (2025): 185,025 ▲
  - Density: 433.1/sq mi (167.2/km^{2})
- Time zone: UTC−5 (Eastern)
  - Summer (DST): UTC−4 (EDT)
- Congressional district: 7th
- Website: www.medinaco.org

Medina County (/məˈdaɪnə/ mə-DY-nə) is a county located in the northeastern region in the U.S. state of Ohio. As of the 2020 census, the population was 182,470. Its county seat is Medina, and its largest city is Brunswick.

The county was created in 1812 and later organized in 1818. It is named for Medina, Saudi Arabia. Medina County is part of the Cleveland, OH Metropolitan Statistical Area, although some southeastern parts of the county are included in the urban area of Akron.

== History ==
Before European colonization, several Native American tribes inhabited northeastern Ohio. After Europeans first crossed into the Americas, the land that became Medina County was colonized by the French, becoming part of the colony of Canada (New France). It was ceded in 1763 to Great Britain and renamed Province of Quebec. In the late 18th century the land became part of the Connecticut Western Reserve in the Northwest Territory, then was purchased by the Connecticut Land Company in 1795. Parts of Medina County and neighbouring Lorain became home to the Black River Colony founded in 1852, a religious community centered on the pious lifestyle of the German Baptist Brethren.

== Geography ==
According to the United States Census Bureau, the county has a total area of 423 square miles (1,096 km^{2}), of which 421.3 square miles (1,091 km^{2}) is land and 1.7 square miles (4 km^{2}) (0.4%) is water.

The Medina County Park District, established in 1965, manages 6,353 acres (2,571 ha), including 18 parks and trails.

=== Adjacent counties ===
- Cuyahoga County (northeast)
- Summit County (east)
- Wayne County (south)
- Ashland County (southwest)
- Lorain County (northwest)

== Demographics ==
Historical population
Census	Pop.	Note	%±
1820	3,082		—
1830	7,560		145.3%
1840	18,352		142.8%
1850	24,441		33.2%
1860	22,517		−7.9%
1870	20,092		−10.8%
1880	21,453		6.8%
1890	21,742		1.3%
1900	21,958		1.0%
1910	23,598		7.5%
1920	26,067		10.5%
1930	29,677		13.8%
1940	33,034		11.3%
1950	40,417		22.3%
1960	65,315		61.6%
1970	82,717		26.6%
1980	113,150		36.8%
1990	122,354		8.1%
2000	151,095		23.5%
2010	172,332		14.1%
2020	182,470		5.9%
2025 (est.)	185,025	▲	1.4%
U.S. Decennial Census; 1790-1960 1900-1990; 1990-2000 2010-2020

=== 2020 census ===
As of the 2020 census, the county had a population of 182,470. The median age was 43.1 years. 22.1% of residents were under the age of 18 and 19.0% of residents were 65 years of age or older. For every 100 females there were 96.7 males, and for every 100 females age 18 and over there were 94.8 males age 18 and over.

The racial makeup of the county was 91.6% White, 1.3% Black or African American, 0.1% American Indian and Alaska Native, 1.2% Asian, <0.1% Native Hawaiian and Pacific Islander, 0.8% from some other race, and 5.0% from two or more races. Hispanic or Latino residents of any race comprised 2.5% of the population.

65.9% of residents lived in urban areas, while 34.1% lived in rural areas.

There were 71,647 households in the county, of which 29.9% had children under the age of 18 living in them. Of all households, 57.5% were married-couple households, 14.9% were households with a male householder and no spouse or partner present, and 21.7% were households with a female householder and no spouse or partner present. About 24.3% of all households were made up of individuals and 11.3% had someone living alone who was 65 years of age or older.

There were 75,169 housing units, of which 4.7% were vacant. Among occupied housing units, 79.9% were owner-occupied and 20.1% were renter-occupied. The homeowner vacancy rate was 0.9% and the rental vacancy rate was 7.4%.

=== Racial and ethnic composition ===
Medina County, Ohio – Racial and ethnic composition Note: the US Census treats Hispanic/Latino as an ethnic category. This table excludes Latinos from the racial categories and assigns them to a separate category. Hispanics/Latinos may be of any race.
Race / Ethnicity (NH = Non-Hispanic)	Pop 1980	Pop 1990	Pop 2000	Pop 2010	Pop 2020	% 1980	% 1990	% 2000	% 2010	% 2020
White alone (NH)	111,402	119,934	145,960	163,794	165,643	98.46%	98.02%	96.60%	95.05%	90.78%
Black or African American alone (NH)	708	847	1,304	1,982	2,292	0.63%	0.69%	0.86%	1.15%	1.26%
Native American or Alaska Native alone (NH)	134	165	209	216	192	0.12%	0.13%	0.14%	0.13%	0.11%
Asian alone (NH)	310	673	962	1,638	2,184	0.27%	0.55%	0.64%	0.95%	1.20%
Native Hawaiian or Pacific Islander alone (NH)	x	x	22	17	28	x	x	0.01%	0.01%	0.02%
Other race alone (NH)	107	24	112	104	589	0.09%	0.02%	0.07%	0.06%	0.32%
Mixed race or Multiracial (NH)	x	x	1,127	1,834	6,950	x	x	0.75%	1.06%	3.81%
Hispanic or Latino (any race)	489	711	1,399	2,747	4,592	0.43%	0.58%	0.93%	1.59%	2.52%
Total	113,150	122,354	151,095	172,332	182,470	100.00%	100.00%	100.00%	100.00%	100.00%

=== 2010 census ===
As of the census of 2010, there were 172,332 people, 65,143 households, and 48,214 families living in the county. The population density was 409.0 inhabitants per square mile (157.9/km^{2}). There were 69,181 housing units at an average density of 164.2 units per square mile (63.4 units/km^{2}). The racial makeup of the county was 96.1% white, 1.2% black or African American, 1.0% Asian, 0.1% American Indian, 0.4% from other races, and 1.2% from two or more races. Those of Hispanic or Latino origin made up 1.6% of the population. In terms of ancestry, 32.7% were German, 18.3% were Irish, 11.6% were English, 10.7% were Italian, 10.4% were Polish, and 7.4% were American.

Of the 65,143 households, 35.3% had children under the age of 18 living with them, 61.5% were married couples living together, 8.7% had a female householder with no husband present, 26.0% were non-families, and 21.6% of all households were made up of individuals. The average household size was 2.63 and the average family size was 3.07. The median age was 40.4 years.

The median income for a household in the county was $66,193 and the median income for a family was $76,699. Males had a median income of $56,523 versus $38,163 for females. The per capita income for the county was $29,986. About 4.4% of families and 6.3% of the population were below the poverty line, including 8.6% of those under age 18 and 5.6% of those age 65 or over.

=== 2000 census ===
As of the census of 2000, there were 151,095 people, 54,542 households, and 42,215 families living in the county. The population density was 358 inhabitants per square mile (138/km^{2}). There were 56,793 housing units at an average density of 135 units per square mile (52 units/km^{2}). The racial makeup of the county was 97.26% White, 0.88% Black or African American, 0.15% Native American, 0.64% Asian, 0.02% Pacific Islander, 0.25% from other races, and 0.80% from two or more races. 0.93% of the population were Hispanic or Latino of any race. 26.8% were of German, 11.5% Irish, 8.6% Italian, 8.4% English, 8.4% Polish and 7.8% American ancestry according to Census 2000. 95.3% spoke English, 1.2% Spanish and 1.0% German as their first language.

There were 54,542 households, of which 37.70% had children under the age of 18 living with them, 66.50% were married couples living together, 7.80% had a female householder with no husband present, and 22.60% were non-families. 18.90% of all households were made up of individuals, and 6.90% had someone living alone who was 65 years of age or older. The average household size was 2.74 and the average family size was 3.15.

In the county, the population was spread out, with 27.50% under the age of 18, 7.00% from 18 to 24, 30.60% from 25 to 44, 24.40% from 45 to 64, and 10.50% who were 65 years of age or older. The median age was 37 years. For every 100 females there were 97.10 males. For every 100 females age 18 and over, there were 94.90 males.

The median income for a household in the county was $55,811, and the median income for a family was $62,489. Males had a median income of $44,600 versus $27,513 for females. The per capita income for the county was $24,251. About 3.50% of families and 4.60% of the population were below the poverty line, including 5.90% of those under age 18 and 4.80% of those age 65 or over.

== Economy ==
According to the county's comprehensive annual financial reports, the top employers by number of employees in the county are the following. ("NR" indicates the employer was not ranked among the top ten employers that year.)

Employer	Employees (2020)	Employees (2011)	Employees (2003)
Westfield Insurance	2,040	1,560	1,292
Cleveland Clinic–Medina Hospital	1,431	886	920
Medina County Government	1,365	1,404	1,600
Brunswick City School District	834	836	850
MTD Products	781	680	2,190
Medina City School District	759	700	780
Sandridge Food Corporation	569	475	NR
Discount Drug Mart	509	NR	2,600
Wadsworth City School District	479	500	NR
Carlisle Brake and Friction	400	NR	NR
Wellman Products Group	NR	440	NR
Shiloh Industries, Inc.	NR	411	NR
Plastik Pak	NR	NR	1,467
Schneider National	NR	NR	800
Friction Products/Hawk	NR	NR	557

== Politics ==
Medina County is a Republican stronghold in presidential elections. It has only backed Democratic nominees 3 times in its history, in 1916, 1936, and 1964.

United States presidential election results for Medina County, Ohio
Year	Republican		Democratic		Third party(ies)	
Year	No.	%	No.	%	No.	%
1856	2,635	62.22%	1,572	37.12%	28	0.66%
1860	3,068	62.64%	1,765	36.04%	65	1.33%
1864	2,936	64.29%	1,631	35.71%	0	0.00%
1868	2,886	63.03%	1,693	36.97%	0	0.00%
1872	2,794	61.80%	1,695	37.49%	32	0.71%
1876	3,119	58.39%	2,192	41.03%	31	0.58%
1880	3,340	60.26%	2,158	38.93%	45	0.81%
1884	3,433	59.62%	2,135	37.08%	190	3.30%
1888	3,333	58.08%	2,181	38.00%	225	3.92%
1892	3,062	56.10%	2,122	38.88%	274	5.02%
1896	3,533	57.32%	2,575	41.77%	56	0.91%
1900	3,510	58.25%	2,360	39.16%	156	2.59%
1904	3,632	67.85%	1,517	28.34%	204	3.81%
1908	3,427	57.32%	2,378	39.77%	174	2.91%
1912	685	12.07%	2,108	37.15%	2,881	50.78%
1916	2,754	46.80%	2,984	50.71%	147	2.50%
1920	6,846	67.63%	3,120	30.82%	156	1.54%
1924	6,756	67.76%	1,844	18.49%	1,371	13.75%
1928	9,510	79.58%	2,357	19.72%	83	0.69%
1932	7,753	55.09%	5,841	41.50%	480	3.41%
1936	7,283	48.37%	7,400	49.14%	375	2.49%
1940	10,116	60.08%	6,722	39.92%	0	0.00%
1944	10,375	63.35%	6,003	36.65%	0	0.00%
1948	9,462	64.29%	5,133	34.88%	122	0.83%
1952	14,433	70.39%	6,071	29.61%	0	0.00%
1956	15,155	70.42%	6,365	29.58%	0	0.00%
1960	16,123	62.21%	9,796	37.79%	0	0.00%
1964	10,221	40.97%	14,729	59.03%	0	0.00%
1968	14,089	52.31%	9,194	34.14%	3,650	13.55%
1972	21,010	64.82%	10,643	32.84%	758	2.34%
1976	19,066	52.60%	16,251	44.83%	932	2.57%
1980	24,723	58.79%	13,573	32.28%	3,754	8.93%
1984	30,690	65.38%	15,897	33.86%	357	0.76%
1988	29,962	60.08%	19,505	39.11%	407	0.82%
1992	24,090	39.75%	18,995	31.34%	17,516	28.90%
1996	26,120	44.21%	23,727	40.16%	9,239	15.64%
2000	37,349	55.84%	26,635	39.82%	2,899	4.33%
2004	48,196	56.78%	36,272	42.73%	410	0.48%
2008	48,189	53.16%	40,924	45.14%	1,539	1.70%
2012	50,418	55.45%	38,785	42.65%	1,728	1.90%
2016	54,810	59.47%	32,182	34.92%	5,171	5.61%
2020	64,598	60.92%	39,800	37.53%	1,643	1.55%
2024	66,308	61.67%	39,771	36.99%	1,439	1.34%

United States Senate election results for Medina County, Ohio1
Year	Republican		Democratic		Third party(ies)	
Year	No.	%	No.	%	No.	%
2024	58,915	55.92%	43,173	40.98%	3,262	3.10%

== Communities ==
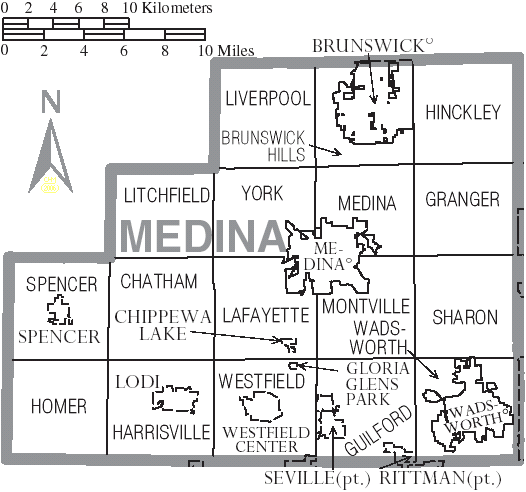
Map of Medina County, Ohio with municipal and township labels

=== Cities ===
- Brunswick (largest city)
- Medina (county seat)
- Rittman (part)
- Wadsworth

=== Villages ===
- Chippewa Lake
- Creston (part)
- Gloria Glens Park
- Lodi
- Seville
- Spencer
- Westfield Center

=== Townships ===
- Brunswick Hills
- Chatham
- Granger
- Guilford
- Harrisville
- Hinckley
- Homer
- Lafayette
- Litchfield
- Liverpool
- Medina
- Montville
- Sharon
- Spencer
- Wadsworth
- Westfield
- York

=== Census-designated place ===
- Sharon Center
- Valley City

=== Unincorporated communities ===
- Abbeyville
- Beebetown
- Bennetts Corners
- Chatham
- Coddingville
- Crawford Corners
- Erhart
- Friendsville
- Granger
- Hinckley
- Homerville
- Litchfield
- Mallet Creek
- Pawnee
- Remsen Corners
- River Styx
- Valley City
- Weymouth
- Western Star

== Notable people ==
- Julia Carter Aldrich, 19th-century American author and editor
- William G. Batchelder, Speaker of the Ohio House of Representatives
- Alice M. Batchelder, federal judge
- Martin and Anna Bates, record holders for tallest married couple
- Connor Cook, NFL quarterback, formerly quarterback for the Michigan State Spartans
- R. Sheldon Duecker, bishop of the United Methodist Church
- Jobie Hughes, one of the authors of the Lorien Legacies
- Mark Hunter, photographer and lead singer of heavy metal band Chimaira
- Kyle Juszczyk, fullback for San Francisco 49ers
- Larry Obhof, attorney and former President of the Ohio Senate
- Matthew "MatPat" Patrick, popular Internet personality
- Pete Rademacher, Olympic boxer
- Amos Root, developed innovative beekeeping techniques in the United States during the mid-19th century
- Drew Allar, Quarterback for Penn State Nittany Lions (2022-2025)

== See also ==
- National Register of Historic Places listings in Medina County, Ohio
