= Crawford Corners, Ohio =

Unincorporated community in Ohio, U.S.

Coordinates: 41°00′36″N 82°03′17″W

Crawford Corners is an unincorporated community in Medina County, in the U.S. state of Ohio.

== History ==
A variant name was Crawfords Mills. A post office called Crawford's Mills was established in 1853, and remained in operation until 1859. The community was named for Joseph Crawford, a pioneer who settled near the site in 1819.
