= Seville, Ohio =

- Village
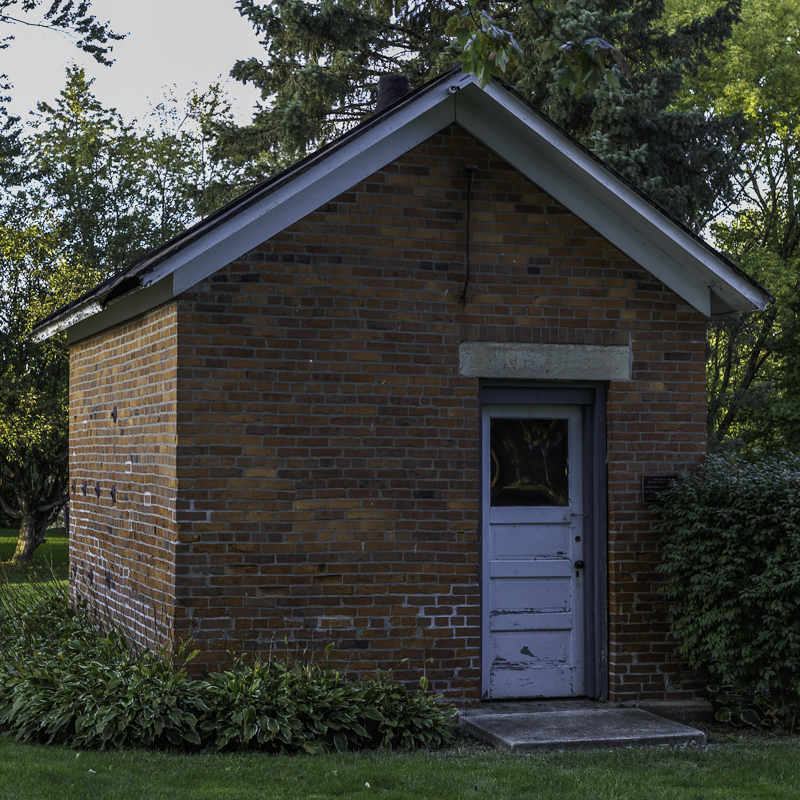
- Historic Seville Jail

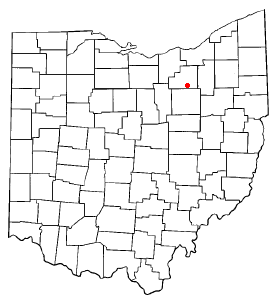
- Location of Seville, Ohio

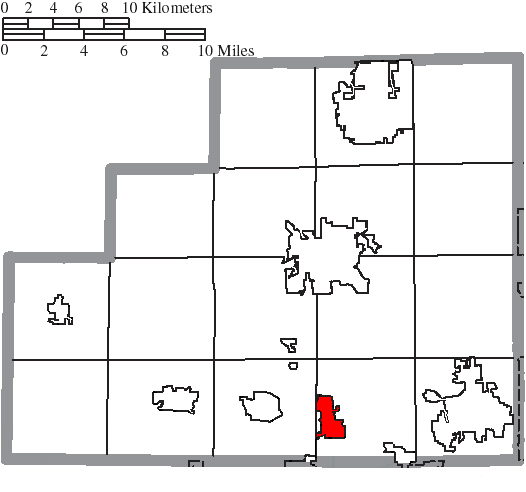
- Location of Seville in Medina County
- Coordinates: 41°01′35″N 81°52′32″W
- Country: United States
- State: Ohio
- County: Medina
- Named for: Seville, Spain

Government
  - Type: Mayor–Council
  - Mayor: Carol Carter

Area
  - Total: 2.61 sq mi (6.75 km^{2})
  - Land: 2.61 sq mi (6.75 km^{2})
  - Water: 0 sq mi (0.00 km^{2})
- Elevation: 997 ft (304 m)

Population (2020)
  - Total: 2,335
  - Density: 895.9/sq mi (345.91/km^{2})
- Time zone: UTC-5 (Eastern (EST))
  - Summer (DST): UTC-4 (EDT)
- ZIP code: 44273
- Area code: 330
- FIPS code: 39-71486
- GNIS feature ID: 2399788
- Website: Village website

Seville is a village in Medina County, Ohio, United States. The population was 2,335 at the 2020 census.

== History ==
Seville was platted in 1828. It was named after Seville, in Spain.

A post office was established in Seville in 1830.

== Geography ==
According to the United States Census Bureau, the village has a total area of 2.60 square miles (6.73 km^{2}), all land.

== Demographics ==
Historical population
Census	Pop.	Note	%±
1870	597		—
1880	589		−1.3%
1890	599		1.7%
1900	602		0.5%
1910	602		0.0%
1920	691		14.8%
1930	785		13.6%
1940	850		8.3%
1950	963		13.3%
1960	1,190		23.6%
1970	1,402		17.8%
1980	1,568		11.8%
1990	1,810		15.4%
2000	2,160		19.3%
2010	2,296		6.3%
2020	2,335		1.7%
U.S. Decennial Census

=== 2010 census ===
As of the census of 2010, there were 2,296 people, 917 households, and 634 families living in the village. The population density was 883.1 inhabitants per square mile (341.0/km^{2}). There were 978 housing units at an average density of 376.2 per square mile (145.3/km^{2}). The racial makeup of the village was 96.9% White, 0.7% African American, 0.2% Native American, 0.5% Asian, 0.4% from other races, and 1.3% from two or more races. Hispanic or Latino of any race were 1.5% of the population.

There were 917 households, of which 30.0% had children under the age of 18 living with them, 53.5% were married couples living together, 10.7% had a female householder with no husband present, 4.9% had a male householder with no wife present, and 30.9% were non-families. 26.2% of all households were made up of individuals, and 9.8% had someone living alone who was 65 years of age or older. The average household size was 2.40 and the average family size was 2.87.

The median age in the village was 41.8 years. 20.9% of residents were under the age of 18; 7.6% were between the ages of 18 and 24; 26.3% were from 25 to 44; 29.1% were from 45 to 64; and 16.1% were 65 years of age or older. The gender makeup of the village was 47.9% male and 52.1% female.

=== 2000 census ===
As of the census of 2000, there were 2,160 people, 808 households, and 611 families living in the village. The population density was 1,070.9 inhabitants per square mile (413.5/km^{2}). There were 847 housing units at an average density of 419.9 per square mile (162.1/km^{2}). The racial makeup of the village was 98.5% White, 0.19% African American, 0.86% Native American, 0.86% Asian, 0.05% from other races, and 0.19% from two or more races. Hispanic or Latino of any race were 0.65% of the population.

There were 808 households, out of which 36.1% had children under the age of 18 living with them, 64.7% were married couples living together, 8.2% had a female householder with no husband present, and 24.3% were non-families. 20.9% of all households were made up of individuals, and 8.5% had someone living alone who was 65 years of age or older. The average household size was 2.58 and the average family size was 2.97.

In the village, the population was spread out, with 25.5% under the age of 18, 6.0% from 18 to 24, 31.9% from 25 to 44, 22.6% from 45 to 64, and 14.0% who were 65 years of age or older. The median age was 37 years. For every 100 females there were 89.0 males. For every 100 females age 18 and over, there were 84.0 males.

The median income for a household in the village was $47,935, and the median income for a family was $54,844. Males had a median income of $41,339 versus $25,000 for females. The per capita income for the village was $22,644. About 2.4% of families and 3.7% of the population were below the poverty line, including 3.3% of those under age 18 and 5.3% of those age 65 or over.

== Education ==
Seville has a public library, a branch of Medina County District Library.

== Ohio Western Reserve National Cemetery ==
The Ohio Western Reserve National Cemetery, opened in 2000, is within city limits.

== In the media ==
Opera North, based in Leeds, England, set its January 2011 production of Georges Bizet's opera Carmen in Seville, Ohio, rather than Seville, Spain.

== Notable people ==
- Martin and Anna Bates – world's tallest married couple
- Lionel Dahmer – American research chemist and author
- John H. Hoover – United States Admiral
- C.V. Matteson – American baseball pitcher and former mayor.
