= Westfield Center, Ohio =

- Village
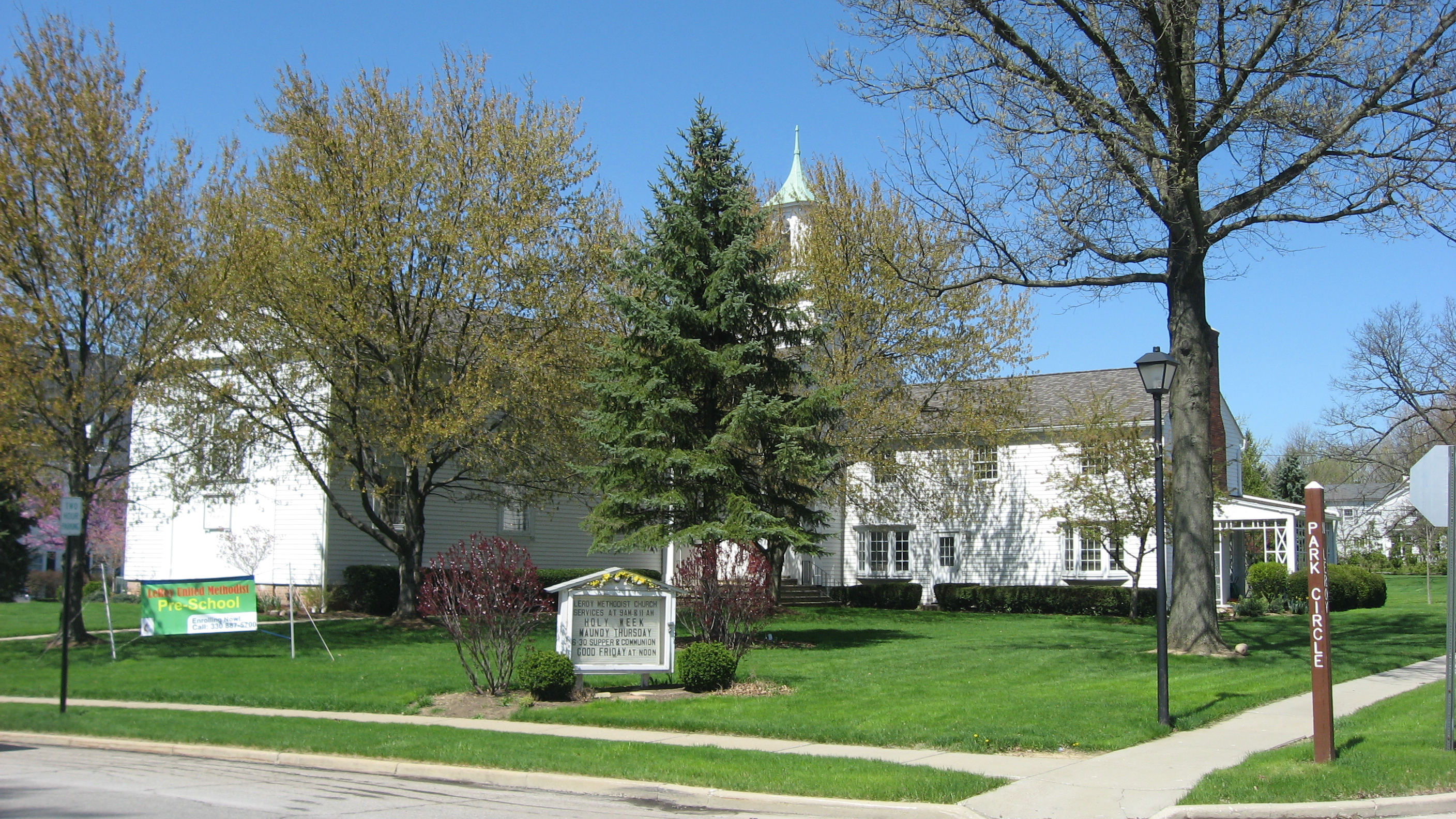
- Church in Westfield Center

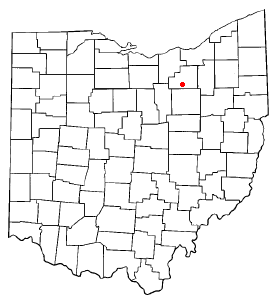
- Location within the state of Ohio

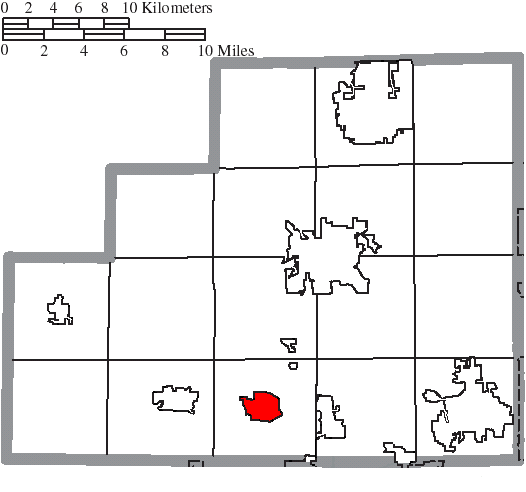
- Location of Westfield Center in Medina County
- Coordinates: 41°01′42″N 81°55′53″W
- Country: United States
- State: Ohio
- County: Medina

Area
  - Total: 2.12 sq mi (5.48 km^{2})
  - Land: 2.12 sq mi (5.48 km^{2})
  - Water: 0 sq mi (0.00 km^{2})
- Elevation: 1,106 ft (337 m)

Population (2020)
  - Total: 1,184
  - Density: 559.6/sq mi (216.05/km^{2})
- Time zone: UTC-5 (Eastern (EST))
  - Summer (DST): UTC-4 (EDT)
- FIPS code: 39-83468
- GNIS feature ID: 2400152
- Website: www.villageofwestfieldcenter.com

Westfield Center is a village in Medina County, Ohio, United States. The population was 1,184 at the 2020 census. It is the home of Westfield Insurance, the largest employer in Medina County.

== History ==
The community was founded in 1826. When it was given a post office, the name "Le Roy" was assigned. The two names were used interchangeably until it was incorporated in 1914 as Le Roy, Ohio. In the early 1970s, the name was changed back to Westfield Center.

One building in Westfield Center, the Universalist Church, has been listed on the National Register of Historic Places.

== Geography ==
According to the United States Census Bureau, the village has a total area of 2.11 square miles (5.46 km^{2}), all land.

== Demographics ==
Historical population
Census	Pop.	Note	%±
1910	192		—
1920	241		25.5%
1930	249		3.3%
1940	254		2.0%
1950	320		26.0%
1960	504		57.5%
1970	715		41.9%
1980	791		10.6%
1990	784		−0.9%
2000	1,054		34.4%
2010	1,115		5.8%
2020	1,184		6.2%
U.S. Decennial Census

=== 2010 census ===
As of the census of 2010, there were 1,115 people, 450 households, and 349 families living in the village. The population density was 528.4 inhabitants per square mile (204.0/km^{2}). There were 473 housing units at an average density of 224.2 per square mile (86.6/km^{2}). The racial makeup of the village was 97.5% White, 0.1% African American, 0.9% Asian, 0.3% from other races, and 1.3% from two or more races. Hispanic or Latino of any race were 1.3% of the population.

There were 450 households, of which 28.2% had children under the age of 18 living with them, 68.0% were married couples living together, 6.4% had a female householder with no husband present, 3.1% had a male householder with no wife present, and 22.4% were non-families. 19.3% of all households were made up of individuals, and 10.6% had someone living alone who was 65 years of age or older. The average household size was 2.48 and the average family size was 2.83.

The median age in the village was 48.4 years. 20.5% of residents were under the age of 18; 6.3% were between the ages of 18 and 24; 17.8% were from 25 to 44; 32.8% were from 45 to 64; and 22.5% were 65 years of age or older. The gender makeup of the village was 50.6% male and 49.4% female.

=== 2000 census ===
As of the census of 2000, there were 1,054 people, 401 households, and 336 families living in the village. The population density was 498.8 inhabitants per square mile (192.6/km^{2}). There were 431 housing units at an average density of 204.0 per square mile (78.8/km^{2}). The racial makeup of the village was 99.05% White, 0.09% Native American, 0.28% Asian, 0.19% Pacific Islander, 0.09% from other races, and 0.28% from two or more races. Hispanic or Latino of any race were 0.57% of the population.

There were 401 households, out of which 31.9% had children under the age of 18 living with them, 76.1% were married couples living together, 5.5% had a female householder with no husband present, and 16.0% were non-families. 13.5% of all households were made up of individuals, and 4.5% had someone living alone who was 65 years of age or older. The average household size was 2.63 and the average family size was 2.88.

In the village, the population was spread out, with 24.3% under the age of 18, 5.3% from 18 to 24, 23.1% from 25 to 44, 33.5% from 45 to 64, and 13.8% who were 65 years of age or older. The median age was 42 years. For every 100 females there were 99.6 males. For every 100 females age 18 and over, there were 98.0 males.

The median income for a household in the village was $69,821, and the median income for a family was $76,651. Males had a median income of $55,893 versus $30,083 for females. The per capita income for the village was $30,679. About 2.1% of families and 3.0% of the population were below the poverty line, including 2.0% of those under age 18 and 1.6% of those age 65 or over.

== Notable person ==
- Lois Youngen, player in the All-American Girls Professional Baseball League

== Gallery ==
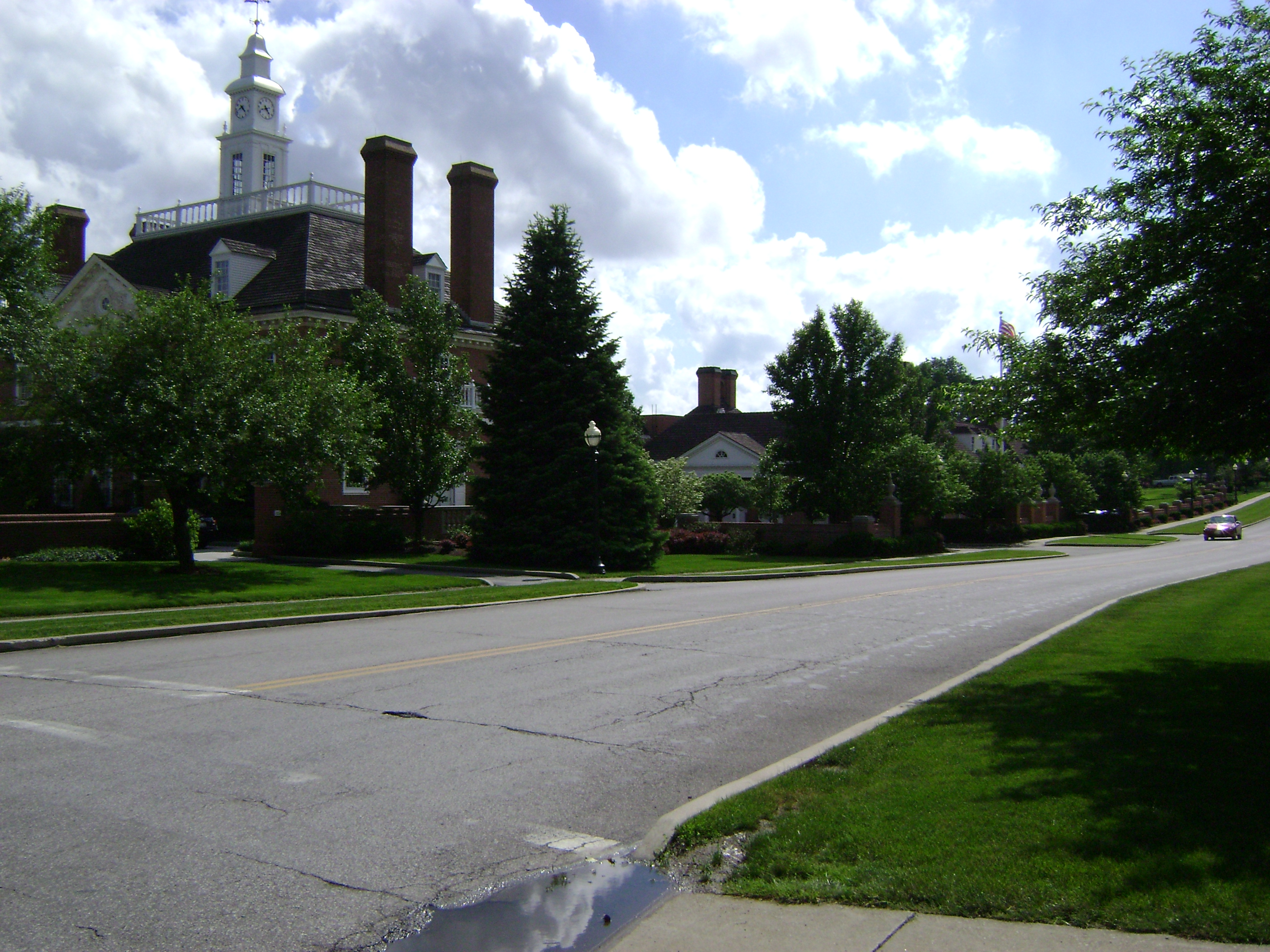
City street view

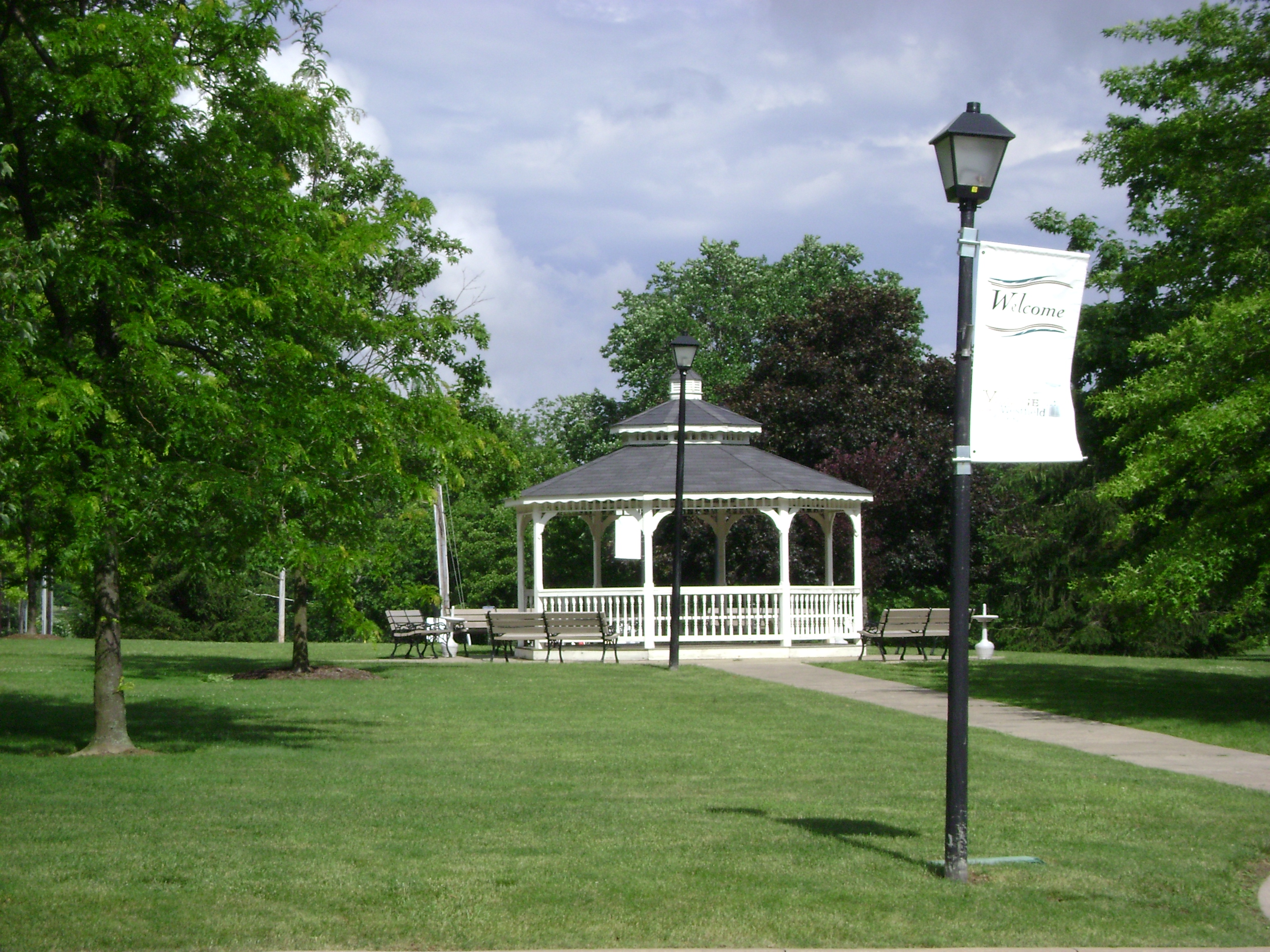
City park
