= National Register of Historic Places listings in Wayne County, Ohio =

Location of Wayne County in Ohio

This is a list of the National Register of Historic Places listings in Wayne County, Ohio.

This is intended to be a complete list of the properties and districts on the National Register of Historic Places in Wayne County, Ohio, United States. The locations of National Register properties and districts for which the latitude and longitude coordinates are included below, may be seen in an online map.

There are 22 properties and districts listed on the National Register in the county.

This National Park Service list is complete through NPS recent listings posted March 20, 2026.

== Current listings ==
	Name on the Register	Image	Date listed	Location	City or town	Description
1	James Akey Farm	James Akey Farm	December 22, 1978 (#78002212)	North of Brenneman Rd., southeast of Mt. Eaton; 40°40′40″N 81°39′18″W	Paint Township	Also known as the Starks Wilderness Center Pioneer Farm
2	Ault-Weygandt Farm	Ault-Weygandt Farm	January 14, 2002 (#01001481)	15090 Back Massillon Rd., northeast of Orrville; 40°52′37″N 81°42′38″W	Baughman Township	
3	Barnet-Hoover Log House	Barnet-Hoover Log House	August 13, 1974 (#74001648)	Northwest of downtown Orrville; 40°51′40″N 81°47′20″W	Orrville	
4	Gen. Reasin Beall House	Gen. Reasin Beall House	June 7, 1976 (#76001548)	546 E. Bowman St. 40°48′20″N 81°56′00″W	Wooster	
5	College of Wooster	College of Wooster	February 25, 1980 (#80003246)	State Route 3; 40°48′37″N 81°56′07″W	Wooster	
6	Deerlick Farm	Deerlick Farm	June 20, 1986 (#86001365)	7482 Britton Rd., east of West Salem; 40°58′14″N 82°04′06″W	Congress Township	
7	Charles Gasche House	Charles Gasche House	January 13, 1989 (#88003192)	340 Bever St. 40°48′07″N 81°56′17″W	Wooster	
8	Gertenslager Carriage and Wagon Company	Gertenslager Carriage and Wagon Company	February 13, 1986 (#86000240)	572 E. Liberty St. 40°47′57″N 81°55′57″W	Wooster	
9	Gish Farmhouses		August 9, 1982 (#13000897)	Gish Rd. 40°59′02″N 81°46′24″W	Rittman	
10	Green Township High School	Green Township High School	September 4, 2013 (#13000684)	484 E. Main St. 40°52′01″N 81°51′17″W	Smithville	Demolished in 2014
11	Kister Mill	Kister Mill	July 10, 1974 (#74001647)	Junction of Township Roads 34 and 228 at Millbrook; 40°43′35″N 82°00′17″W	Clinton Township	
12	Liggett-Freedlander House	Liggett-Freedlander House	July 22, 1994 (#94000770)	408 N. Bever St. 40°48′09″N 81°56′17″W	Wooster	
13	John McSweeney House	John McSweeney House	July 30, 1974 (#74001649)	531 N. Market St. 40°48′13″N 81°56′28″W	Wooster	
14	Tawney Musser Farm		March 4, 2021 (#100006182)	10495 Black Diamond Rd. 40°55′39″N 81°41′05″W	Marshallville vicinity	
15	Old Wayne County Jail	Old Wayne County Jail	April 29, 1982 (#82003665)	W. North St. 40°47′58″N 81°56′30″W	Wooster	
16	Orrville Downtown Historic District	Orrville Downtown Historic District	June 15, 2011 (#11000370)	Market St. roughly between High & Main; 40°50′26″N 81°45′52″W	Orrville	
17	Overholt House	Overholt House	December 6, 1983 (#83004345)	1473 Beall Ave. 40°48′55″N 81°56′02″W	Wooster	Demolished in 2017.
18	Schantz Organ Company	Schantz Organ Company	August 17, 2021 (#100006818)	626 South Walnut St. 40°50′05″N 81°45′48″W	Orrville	
19	J.M. Smucker House		September 2, 2022 (#100008048)	708 North Main St. 40°50′46″N 81°45′50″W	Orrville	
20	Walnut Street School	Walnut Street School	March 1, 1984 (#84003811)	237 S. Walnut St. 40°47′47″N 81°56′29″W	Wooster	
21	Wayne County Courthouse District	Wayne County Courthouse District	July 26, 1973 (#73001551)	Liberty and Market Sts. 40°47′55″N 81°56′26″W	Wooster	
22	Ezekiel B. Zimmerman Octagon House	Ezekiel B. Zimmerman Octagon House	May 28, 1975 (#75001553)	Northwest of Marshallville on State Route 57; 40°55′22″N 81°45′47″W	Chippewa Township	

== See also ==
- List of National Historic Landmarks in Ohio
- Listings in neighboring counties: Ashland, Holmes, Medina, Stark, Summit
- National Register of Historic Places listings in Ohio
