= National Register of Historic Places listings in Medina County, Ohio =

Location of Medina County in Ohio

This is a list of the National Register of Historic Places listings in Medina County, Ohio.

This is intended to be a complete list of the properties and districts on the National Register of Historic Places in Medina County, Ohio, United States. The locations of National Register properties and districts for which the latitude and longitude coordinates are included below, may be seen in an online map.

There are 33 properties and districts listed on the National Register in the county. Another property was once listed but has been removed.

This National Park Service list is complete through NPS recent listings posted March 27, 2026.

== Current listings ==
	Name on the Register	Image	Date listed	Location	City or town	Description
1	Black River Viaduct, Baltimore and Ohio Railroad	Black River Viaduct, Baltimore and Ohio Railroad	May 6, 1976 (#76001488)	1 mi (1.6 km) west of Lodi off State Route 421; 41°01′38″N 82°02′29″W	Harrisville Township	
2	H.G. Blake House	H.G. Blake House	September 30, 1982 (#82003612)	314 E. Washington St. 41°08′16″N 81°51′36″W	Medina	
3	Burritt Blakslee House	Burritt Blakslee House	December 4, 1974 (#74001573)	3756 Fenn Rd., northeast of Medina; 41°10′14″N 81°49′17″W	Medina Township	
4	George Burr House	George Burr House	May 3, 1976 (#76001489)	740 Wooster Rd. 41°01′29″N 81°59′50″W	Lodi	
5	Matthew Chandler House	Matthew Chandler House	March 30, 1978 (#78002134)	South of Sharon Center at 6908 Ridge Rd. 41°05′11″N 81°44′10″W	Sharon Township	
6	Zimri Cook House	Zimri Cook House	June 22, 1976 (#76001487)	6999 Spieth Rd. in Lester; 41°10′52″N 81°56′24″W	York Township	
7	Charles Frank House and Store	Charles Frank House and Store	September 5, 1975 (#75001485)	West of Valley City at the junction of State Route 303 and County Route 23; 41°14′14″N 81°57′15″W	Liverpool Township	
8	Jacob Gayer House	Jacob Gayer House	June 22, 1979 (#79001894)	North of Medina at 4508 Marks Rd. 41°09′08″N 81°52′43″W	Medina Township	
9	Halsey Hulburt Homestead	Halsey Hulburt Homestead	December 1, 1988 (#88002747)	5484 Seville Rd., west of Seville; 41°00′41″N 81°53′13″W	Guilford Township	
10	King-Phillips-Deibel House	King-Phillips-Deibel House	December 16, 1982 (#82001472)	506 N. Broadway St. 41°08′40″N 81°51′45″W	Medina	
11	R.M. and Elizabeth McDowell House		January 3, 2025 (#100011234)	205 South Prospect Street; 41°08′17″N 81°52′16″W	Medina	Now the McDowell-Phillips House Museum.
12	Medfair Heights Apartment Historic District	Medfair Heights Apartment Historic District	July 2, 2008 (#08000624)	221 N. State St. 41°08′28″N 81°52′47″W	Medina	
13	Medina County Courthouse	Medina County Courthouse	July 16, 1970 (#70000507)	Liberty St. and Broadway, Public Sq. 41°08′20″N 81°51′45″W	Medina	
14	Medina Farmers Exchange Co.	Medina Farmers Exchange Co.	February 14, 2018 (#100002123)	320 S. Court St. 41°08′08″N 81°51′50″W	Medina	
15	Medina Masonic Temple and Medina Theater	Medina Masonic Temple and Medina Theater	October 22, 2002 (#02001210)	120 N. Elmwood Ave. and 139 W. Liberty St. 41°08′23″N 81°51′56″W	Medina	Torn down in late 2016
16	Medina Public Square Historic District	Medina Public Square Historic District	June 11, 1975 (#75001483)	Public Sq. and surrounding properties 41°08′19″N 81°51′49″W	Medina	
17	Judge Albert Munson House	Judge Albert Munson House	November 26, 1980 (#80003156)	141 S. Prospect St. 41°08′19″N 81°52′17″W	Medina	Previously located at 231 E. Washington St.; relocated to prevent destruction
18	Paleo Crossing Site	Paleo Crossing Site	July 30, 1992 (#92000972)	Northwest of the junction of Ridgewood and State Rds. 41°07′20″N 81°43′13″W	Sharon Township	
19	Parmelee House	Parmelee House	November 29, 1979 (#79001895)	1328 W. River Rd. in Valley City; 41°14′18″N 81°55′51″W	Liverpool Township	
20	A.I. and E.R. Root Homestead	A.I. and E.R. Root Homestead	June 10, 1975 (#75001484)	662 W. Liberty St. 41°08′20″N 81°52′29″W	Medina	
21	St. Mark's Episcopal Church	St. Mark's Episcopal Church	February 6, 1973 (#73001506)	146 College St. 41°01′33″N 81°43′53″W	Wadsworth	
22	St. Martin's Catholic Church	St. Martin's Catholic Church	November 12, 1975 (#75001486)	Southwest of Valley City on Station Rd. (County Road 23); 41°13′30″N 81°57′18″W	Liverpool Township	
23	St. Paul's Episcopal Church	St. Paul's Episcopal Church	June 1, 1982 (#82003613)	317 E. Liberty St. 41°08′22″N 81°51′38″W	Medina	
24	Seville Inn	Seville Inn	August 28, 2020 (#100005486)	39 West Main St. 41°00′36″N 81°51′49″W	Seville	
25	Seville Jail	Seville Jail	September 26, 1997 (#97001135)	70 W. Main St. 41°00′37″N 81°52′00″W	Seville	
26	William H. Seymour House	William H. Seymour House	June 4, 1979 (#79001896)	3306 S. Weymouth Rd. at Weymouth; 41°11′07″N 81°47′41″W	Medina Township	
27	Sharon Center Public Square Historic District	Sharon Center Public Square Historic District	October 3, 1980 (#80003157)	State Routes State Route 94 and 162 in Sharon Center; 41°05′57″N 81°44′09″W	Sharon Township	
28	Spring Grove Cemetery	Spring Grove Cemetery	June 7, 2006 (#06000482)	Spring Grove St. 41°08′22″N 81°51′06″W	Medina	
29	United States Post Office		August 20, 2019 (#100004307)	143 West Liberty St. 41°08′21″N 81°51′57″W	Medina	Now the Donald J. Pease Federal Building.
30	Universalist Church Of Westfield Center	Universalist Church Of Westfield Center	November 29, 1978 (#78002135)	LeRoy and Greenwich Rds. 41°01′39″N 81°55′59″W	Westfield Center	
31	Wadsworth Downtown Historic District		August 19, 2024 (#100009356)	Roughly bounded by 101-161 and 102-146 High, 117-129 Broad, 111-273, 102-156 and 246-258 Main, 188 South Lyman, 105 Garfield, and 107-155 and 112-116 College Sts., 110-122 Watrusa Ave. 41°01′32″N 81°43′49″W	Wadsworth	
32	Wheeling and Lake Erie Railroad Depot	Wheeling and Lake Erie Railroad Depot	January 23, 2013 (#12001215)	204 Railroad St. 41°01′50″N 82°00′46″W	Lodi	
33	York United Methodist Church	York United Methodist Church	February 17, 1978 (#78002133)	Norwalk Rd. in Mallet Creek; 41°10′01″N 81°55′29″W	York Township	

== Former listing ==
	Name on the Register	Image	Date listed	Date removed	Location	City or town	Description
1	Brunswick Town Hall and School		December 18, 1975 (#75002167)	September 30, 1976	1380 Pearl Rd. 41°14′19″N 81°50′30″W	York Township	

== See also ==
- List of National Historic Landmarks in Ohio
- Listings in neighboring counties: Ashland, Cuyahoga, Lorain, Summit, Wayne
- National Register of Historic Places listings in Ohio
