= East Union =

East Union may refer to several places in the United States:

- East Union, Kentucky
- East Union, Minnesota
- East Union, Noble County, Ohio, an unincorporated community
- East Union, Wayne County, Ohio, an unincorporated community
- East Union Township, Ohio
- East Union Township, Pennsylvania
