= Milton Township, Ohio =

Milton Township, Ohio may refer to several places:

- Milton Township, Ashland County, Ohio
- Milton Township, Jackson County, Ohio
- Milton Township, Mahoning County, Ohio
- Milton Township, Wayne County, Ohio
- Milton Township, Wood County, Ohio

== See also ==
- Milton Township (disambiguation)
