= Paint Township, Wayne County, Ohio =

Township in Ohio, US

- Township
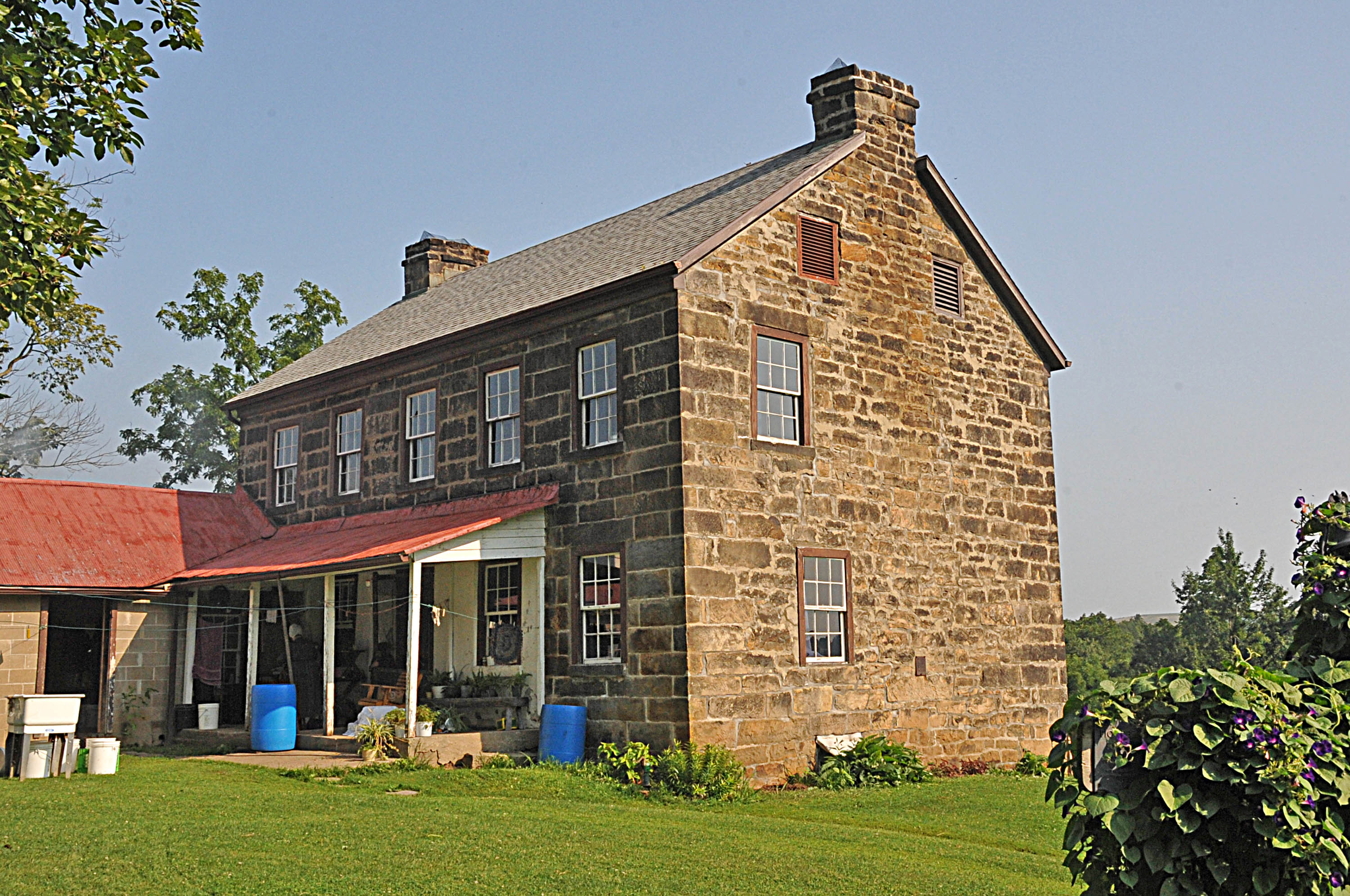
- Stark Wilderness Center Pioneer Farm

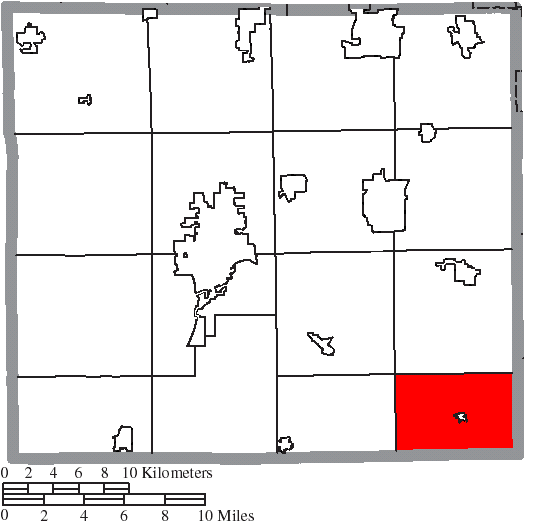
- Location of Paint Township in Wayne County
- Coordinates: 40°41′49″N 81°42′30″W
- Country: United States
- State: Ohio
- County: Wayne

Area
  - Total: 24.4 sq mi (63.2 km^{2})
  - Land: 24.4 sq mi (63.2 km^{2})
  - Water: 0 sq mi (0.0 km^{2})
- Elevation: 1,102 ft (336 m)

Population (2020)
  - Total: 3,458
  - Density: 142/sq mi (54.7/km^{2})
- Time zone: UTC-5 (Eastern (EST))
  - Summer (DST): UTC-4 (EDT)
- FIPS code: 39-59556
- GNIS feature ID: 1087158

Historical population
Census	Pop.	Note	%±
1990	2,506		—
2000	2,823		12.6%
2010	3,209		13.7%
2020	3,458		7.8%
US Census:

Paint Township is one of the sixteen townships of Wayne County, Ohio, United States. The 2020 census found 3,458 people in the township.

== Geography ==
Located in the southeastern corner of the county, it borders the following townships:

- Sugar Creek Township - north
- Sugar Creek Township, Stark County - east
- Paint Township, Holmes County - south
- Salt Creek Township, Holmes County - southwest corner
- Salt Creek Township - west
- East Union Township - northwest corner

The village of Mount Eaton is located in central Paint Township.

== Name and history ==
Paint Township most likely was named for a local spring where the water was imparted with a reddish hue. It is one of six Paint Townships statewide.

== Government ==
The township is governed by a three-member board of trustees, who are elected in November of odd-numbered years to a four-year term beginning on the following January 1. Two are elected in the year after the presidential election and one is elected in the year before it. There is also an elected township fiscal officer, who serves a four-year term beginning on April 1 of the year after the election, which is held in November of the year before the presidential election. Vacancies in the fiscal officership or on the board of trustees are filled by the remaining trustees.
