= Reedurban, Ohio =

- Census-designated place
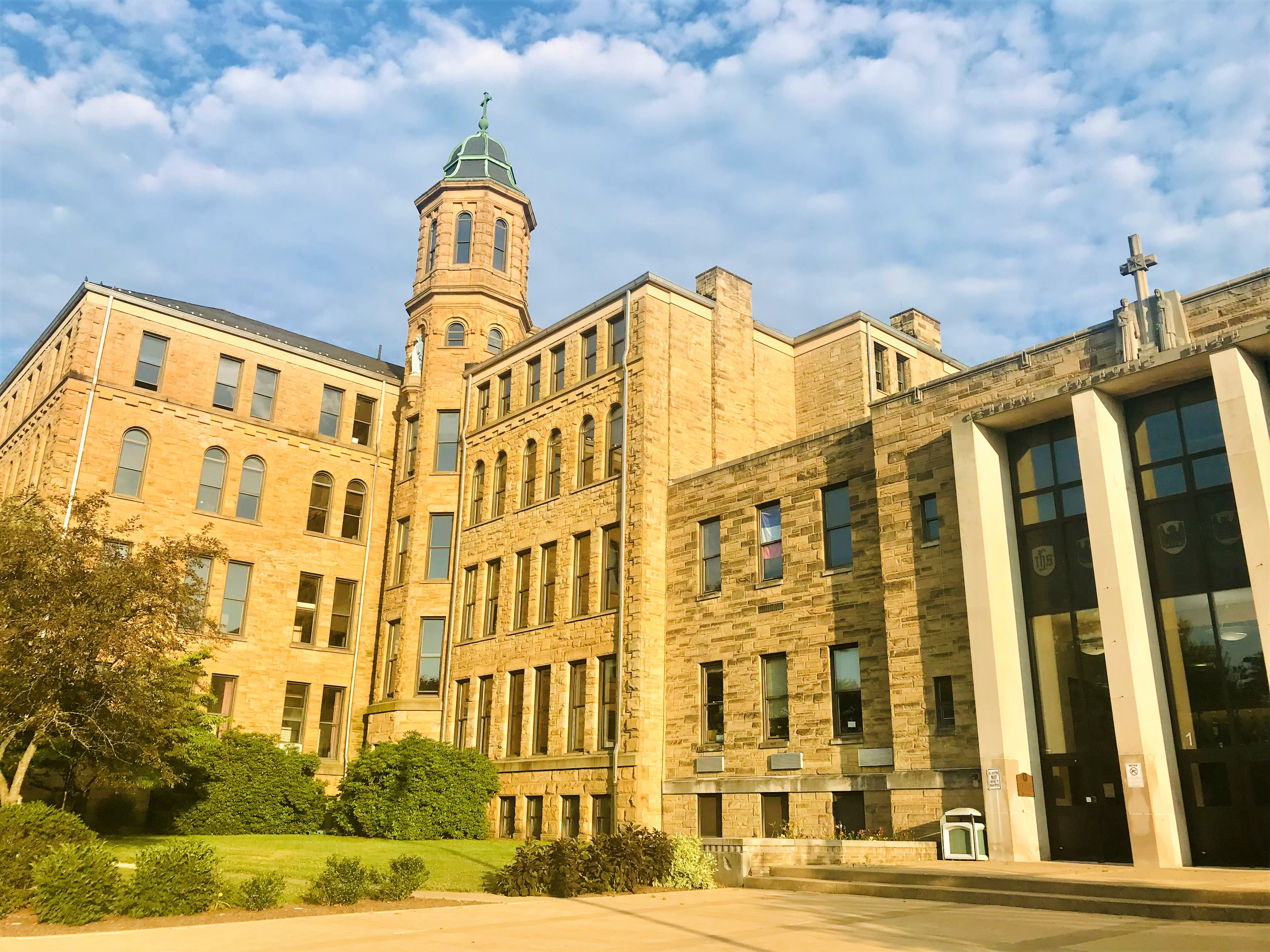
- Central Catholic High School

- Location within Ohio Location within the United States
- Coordinates: 40°47′52″N 81°26′09″W
- Country: United States
- State: Ohio
- County: Stark
- Township: Perry

Area
  - Total: 1.90 sq mi (4.91 km^{2})
  - Land: 1.90 sq mi (4.91 km^{2})
  - Water: 0 sq mi (0.00 km^{2})
- Elevation: 1,122 ft (342 m)

Population (2020)
  - Total: 5,889
  - Density: 3,106.3/sq mi (1,199.34/km^{2})
- Time zone: UTC-5 (Eastern (EST))
  - Summer (DST): UTC-4 (EDT)
- ZIP Codes: 44708, 44710 (Canton)
- Area codes: 330/234
- FIPS code: 39-66012
- GNIS feature ID: 2812843

Reedurban is an unincorporated community and census-designated place (CDP) in Perry Township, Stark County, Ohio, United States. It was first listed as a CDP prior to the 2020 census, where it had a population of 5,889.

The CDP is in central Stark County, on the west side of Canton. It is in northeastern Perry Township. Ohio State Route 172 (Tuscarawas Street) is the main road through Reedurban, leading east 3 miles (5 km) to the center of Canton and west through Perry Heights 4.5 miles (7.2 km) to Massillon.

== Demographics ==
Historical population
Census	Pop.	Note	%±
2020	5,889		—
U.S. Decennial Census
