= Milton Township =

Milton Township may refer to:

- Milton Township, DuPage County, Illinois
- Milton Township, Jefferson County, Indiana
- Milton Township, Butler County, Kansas
- Milton Township, Marion County, Kansas
- Milton Township, Antrim County, Michigan
- Milton Township, Cass County, Michigan
- Milton Township, Dodge County, Minnesota
- Milton Township, Caswell County, North Carolina, in Caswell County, North Carolina
- Milton Township, Ashland County, Ohio
- Milton Township, Jackson County, Ohio
- Milton Township, Mahoning County, Ohio
- Milton Township, Wayne County, Ohio
- Milton Township, Wood County, Ohio
