= Green Township, Wayne County, Ohio =

Township in Ohio, US

- Township
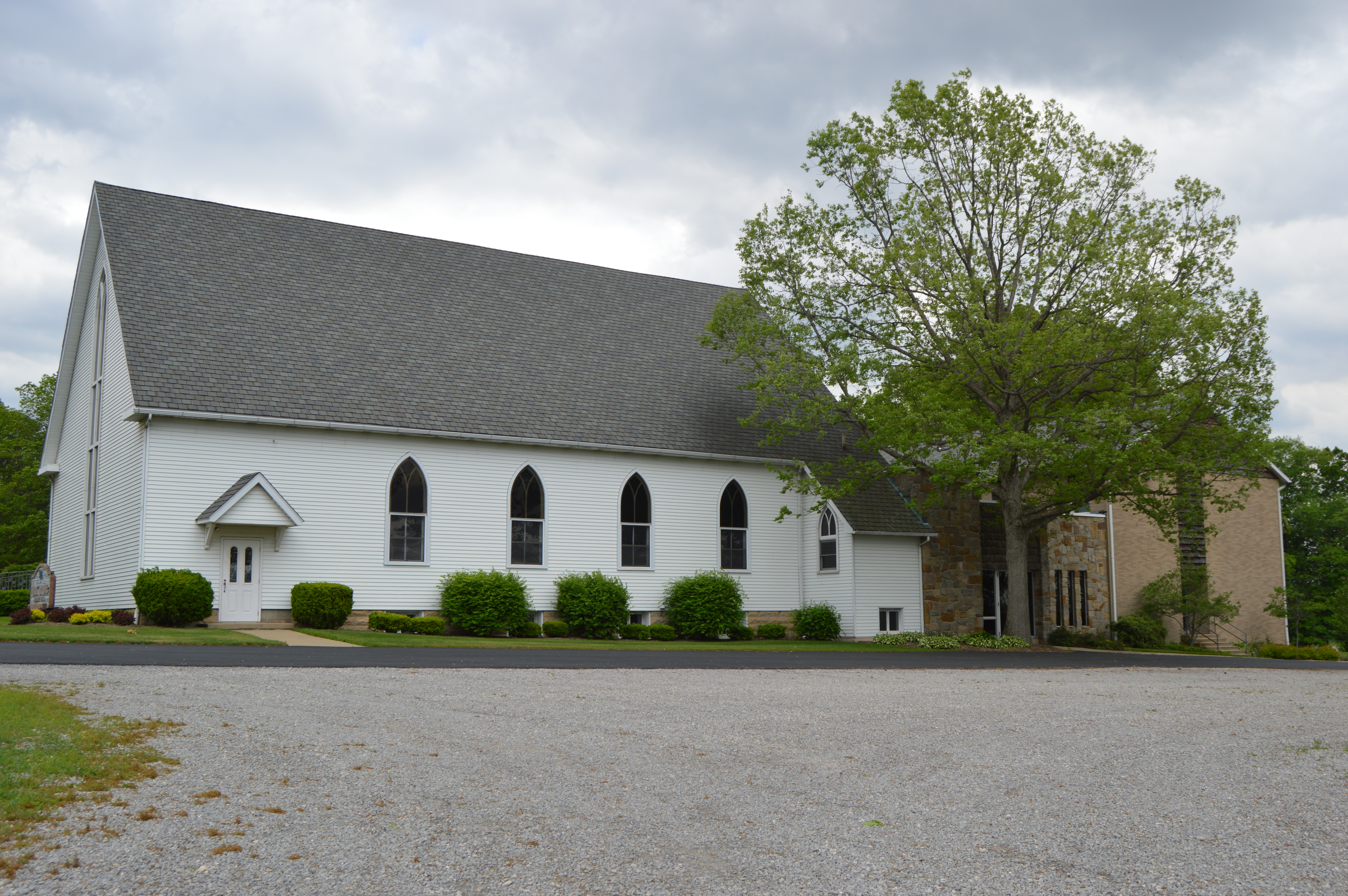
- Oak Grove Mennonite Church on Smucker Road

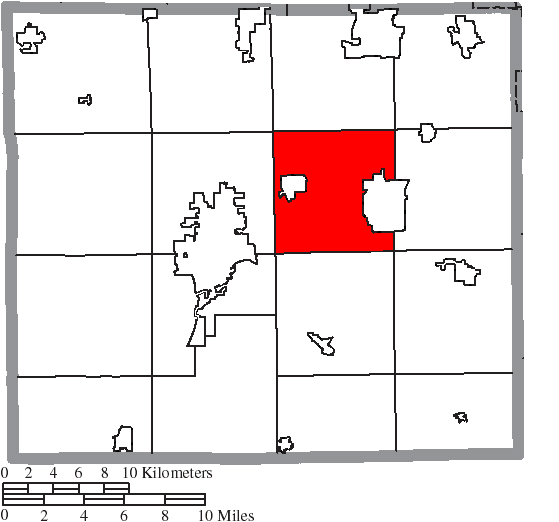
- Location of Green Township in Wayne County
- Coordinates: 40°50′53″N 81°47′57″W
- Country: United States
- State: Ohio
- County: Wayne

Area
  - Total: 36.0 sq mi (93.3 km^{2})
  - Land: 36.0 sq mi (93.2 km^{2})
  - Water: 0 sq mi (0.0 km^{2})
- Elevation: 1,145 ft (349 m)

Population (2020)
  - Total: 12,246
  - Density: 340/sq mi (131.4/km^{2})
- Time zone: UTC-5 (Eastern (EST))
  - Summer (DST): UTC-4 (EDT)
- FIPS code: 39-31878
- GNIS feature ID: 1087156

Green Township is one of the sixteen townships of Wayne County, Ohio, United States. The 2020 census found 12,246 people in the township.

== Geography ==
Located in the central part of the county, it borders the following townships:

- Milton Township - north
- Chippewa Township - northeast corner
- Baughman Township - east
- Sugar Creek Township - southeast corner
- East Union Township - south
- Wooster Township - southwest corner
- Wayne Township - west
- Canaan Township - northwest corner

The unincorporated community of Weilersville is located at the crossroads of the eponymous Weilersville Road and Eby Road in the southwestern quadrant of the township. Although it was once a bustling hamlet with numerous businesses, including a general store, a blacksmith, a woodworking shop, two stockyards, a grain elevator, an active line of the Pittsburgh, Fort Wayne and Chicago Railroad, and even a post office, very little of the original community remains, and it is now largely a residential neighborhood directly south of the village of Smithville.

The settlement of Paradise was once centered around Rohrer Road in the center of the township. Nothing of the original community remains and it is now considered a historic settlement or a ghost town.

Two municipalities are located in Green Township: part of the city of Orrville in the east, and the village of Smithville in the west.

== Name and history ==
It is one of sixteen Green Townships statewide.

== Government ==
The township is governed by a three-member board of trustees, who are elected in November of odd-numbered years to a four-year term beginning on the following January 1. Two are elected in the year after the presidential election and one is elected in the year before it. There is also an elected township fiscal officer, who serves a four-year term beginning on April 1 of the year after the election, which is held in November of the year before the presidential election. Vacancies in the fiscal officership or on the board of trustees are filled by the remaining trustees.
