= Richville, Ohio =

- CDP
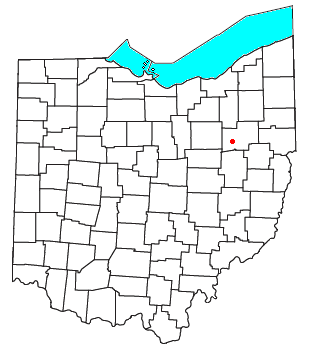
- Location of Richville, Ohio
- Coordinates: 40°44′50″N 81°28′12″W
- Country: United States
- State: Ohio
- County: Stark
- Township: Perry
- Elevation: 1,155 ft (352 m)

Population (2020)
  - Total: 3,209
- Time zone: UTC-5 (Eastern (EST))
  - Summer (DST): UTC-4 (EDT)
- GNIS feature ID: 2628959

Richville is an unincorporated community and census-designated place in southern Perry Township, Stark County, Ohio, United States. State Route 627 passes through the community. The community is part of the Canton–Massillon Metropolitan Statistical Area. The population was 3,209 at the 2020 census.

== History ==
Richville was laid out in 1836. A post office was established at Richville in 1872, and remained in operation until 1902.

In 1997, the former Richville Elementary School was sold to a local church, which later abandoned the property. Efforts to sell the property to recover unpaid back taxes were unsuccessful, in part because of the potential cost of asbestos remediation. The building was later demolished.

== Demographics ==
=== 2020 census ===
As of the 2020 census, Richville had a population of 3,209. The median age was 45.1 years. 19.0% of residents were under the age of 18 and 22.7% of residents were 65 years of age or older. For every 100 females there were 102.8 males, and for every 100 females age 18 and over there were 102.7 males age 18 and over.

95.5% of residents lived in urban areas, while 4.5% lived in rural areas.

There were 1,361 households in Richville, of which 25.9% had children under the age of 18 living in them. Of all households, 52.3% were married-couple households, 16.5% were households with a male householder and no spouse or partner present, and 22.9% were households with a female householder and no spouse or partner present. About 24.7% of all households were made up of individuals and 10.2% had someone living alone who was 65 years of age or older.

There were 1,405 housing units, of which 3.1% were vacant. The homeowner vacancy rate was 0.6% and the rental vacancy rate was 1.0%.

Racial composition as of the 2020 census
Race	Number	Percent
White	2,888	90.0%
Black or African American	106	3.3%
American Indian and Alaska Native	4	0.1%
Asian	12	0.4%
Native Hawaiian and Other Pacific Islander	0	0.0%
Some other race	31	1.0%
Two or more races	168	5.2%
Hispanic or Latino (of any race)	70	2.2%
