= Lawrence Township, Stark County, Ohio =

Township in Ohio, US

- Township
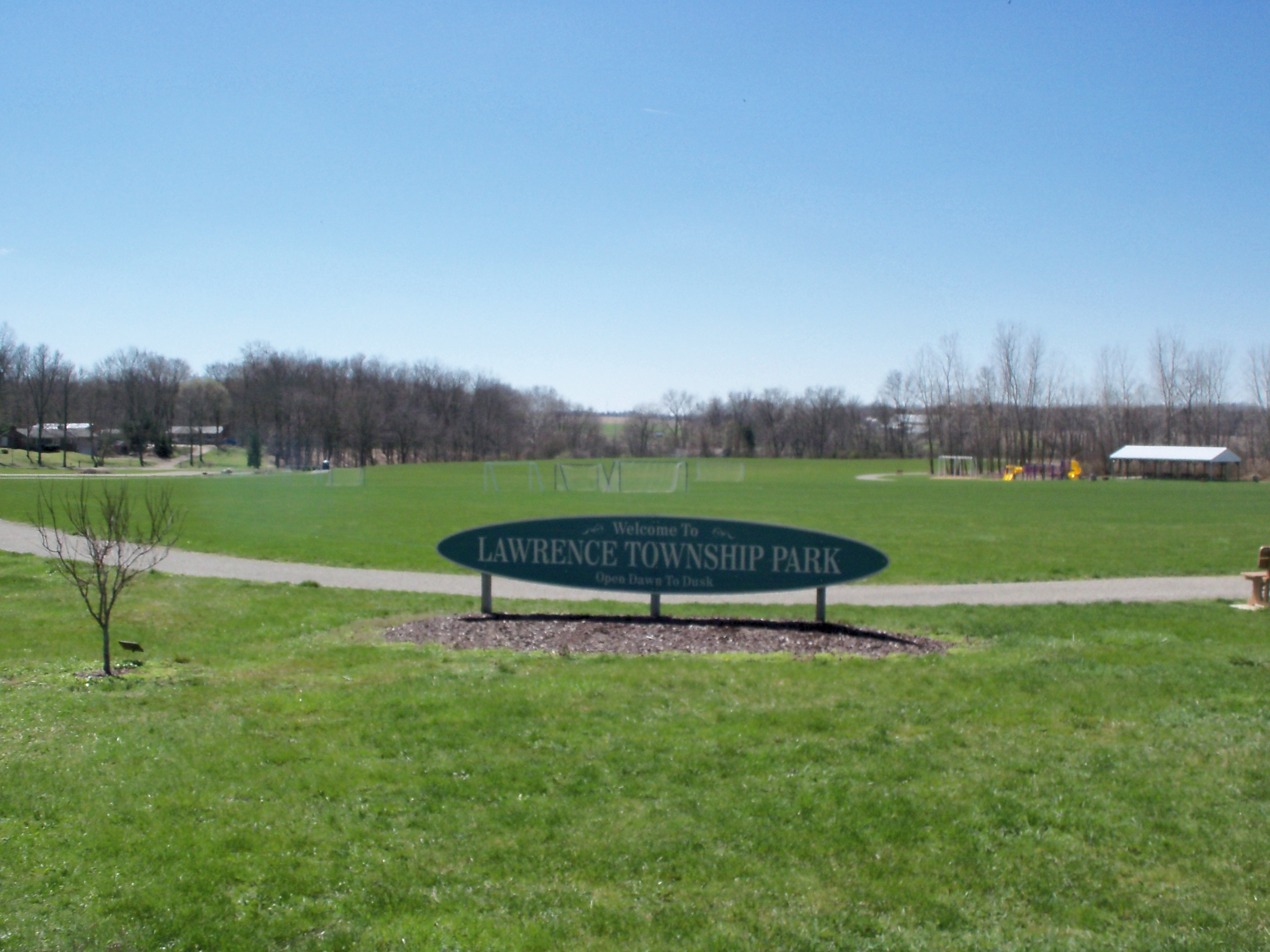
- Township park

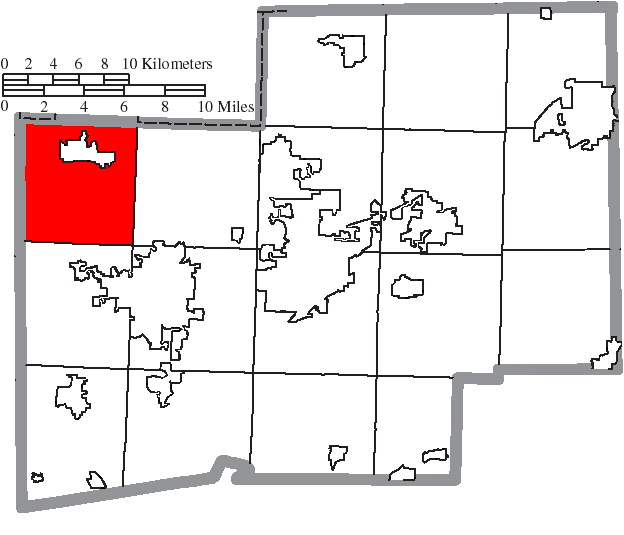
- Location of Lawrence Township in Stark County
- Coordinates: 40°52′54″N 81°35′24″W
- Country: United States
- State: Ohio
- County: Stark

Area
  - Total: 34.9 sq mi (90.4 km^{2})
  - Land: 34.6 sq mi (89.6 km^{2})
  - Water: 0.35 sq mi (0.9 km^{2})
- Elevation: 1,007 ft (307 m)

Population (2020)
  - Total: 13,548
  - Density: 392/sq mi (151.2/km^{2})
- Time zone: UTC-5 (Eastern (EST))
  - Summer (DST): UTC-4 (EDT)
- ZIP code: 44614, 44666
- Area code: 330
- FIPS code: 39-42168
- GNIS feature ID: 1086978
- Website: https://lawrencetwp-oh.org/

Lawrence Township is one of the seventeen townships of Stark County, Ohio, United States. The 2020 census found 13,548 people in the township.

== Geography ==
Located in the northwestern corner of the county, it borders the following townships and municipalities:

- New Franklin - north
- Green - northeast corner
- Jackson Township - east
- Perry Township - southeast corner
- Tuscarawas Township - south
- Baughman Township, Wayne County - west
- Chippewa Township, Wayne County - northwest, west of Clinton
- Clinton - northwest, east of Chippewa Township

The City of Canal Fulton is surrounded by Lawrence Township, and the unincorporated communities of North Lawrence, Newman, and Urban Hill lie within the southern part of the township.

== Name and history ==
Statewide, other Lawrence Townships are located in Lawrence, Tuscarawas, and Washington counties. In 1833, Lawrence Township contained 3 gristmills, 3 saw mills, 3 tanneries, and 2 stores.

== Government ==
The township is governed by a three-member board of trustees, who are elected in November of odd-numbered years to a four-year term beginning on the following January 1. Two are elected in the year after the presidential election and one is elected in the year before it. There is also an elected township fiscal officer, who serves a four-year term beginning on April 1 of the year after the election, which is held in November of the year before the presidential election. Vacancies in the fiscal officership or on the board of trustees are filled by the remaining trustees.

== Education ==
Lawrence Township is divided between three school districts. The northern half of the township is served by the Northwest Local School District, while the southern half is part of Tuslaw Local School District. A small area along Erie Avenue in the eastern part of the township is zoned to the Jackson Local School District.
