= Sugar Creek Township, Wayne County, Ohio =

Township in Ohio, US

- Township
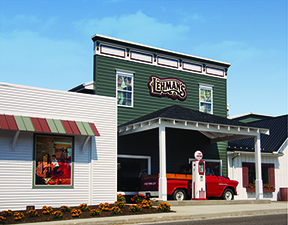
- Commercial district in Kidron

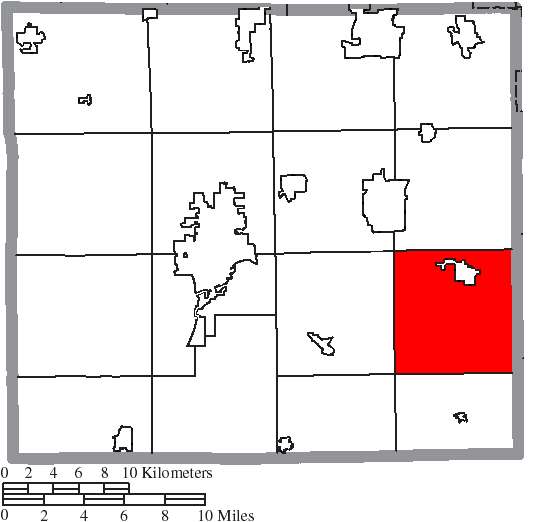
- Location of Sugar Creek Township in Wayne County
- Coordinates: 40°46′46″N 81°42′38″W
- Country: United States
- State: Ohio
- County: Wayne

Area
  - Total: 37.3 sq mi (96.6 km^{2})
  - Land: 37.3 sq mi (96.5 km^{2})
  - Water: 0.039 sq mi (0.1 km^{2})
- Elevation: 1,119 ft (341 m)

Population (2020)
  - Total: 7,187
  - Density: 193/sq mi (74.5/km^{2})
- Time zone: UTC-5 (Eastern (EST))
  - Summer (DST): UTC-4 (EDT)
- FIPS code: 39-75231
- GNIS feature ID: 1087161
- Website: https://www.sugarcreekwayne.com/

Sugar Creek Township is one of the sixteen townships of Wayne County, Ohio, United States. The 2020 census found 7,187 people in the township.

== Geography ==
Located in the eastern part of the county, it borders the following townships:

- Baughman Township - north
- Tuscarawas Township, Stark County - east
- Sugar Creek Township, Stark County - southeast
- Paint Township - south
- Salt Creek Township - southwest corner
- Green Township - northwest corner
- East Union Township - west

The village of Dalton is located in northern Sugar Creek Township, and the census-designated place of Kidron lies in the southwestern part of the township.

== Name and history ==
It is one of five Sugar Creek Townships statewide.

The first settler in Sugar Creek township was James Goudy in 1808. He established a lumber mill along the banks of Sugar Creek in the northeast part of Sugar Creek township. “Brief Historical Memento of Dalton, Ohio”, August 8, 1940, Carl Lawrence and Dean Norris, pgs. 5 & 53.

Between 1808 and 1810, a road was cut through the densely forested land from Canton to Wooster. “Brief Historical Memento of Dalton, Ohio”, August 8, 1940, Carl Lawrence and Dean Norris, pgs. 19 & 51. Wooster Daily Record, Monday, January 10, 1949, pg. 10. Wooster Daily Record, Tuesday, September 23, 1957, pg. 9.

In 1812, four townships were created in Wayne County, Sugar Creek, Wooster, Mohican, and Prairie. “Brief Historical Memento of Dalton, Ohio”, August 8, 1940, Carl Lawrence and Dean Norris, pg. 11.

In 1814, the Church of Sugar Creek was organized and in 1817 the village of Dover (part of present-day Dalton, OH) was surveyed. Wooster Daily Record, Tuesday, September 23, 1957, pg. 9.

In 1819 the Sonnenberg village (near present-day Kidron, OH) was established in the southwestern part of Sugar Creek township. These settlers were Mennonites from the canton of Bern in Switzerland.

The post office in Dover (now Dalton) was established in 1825. “Brief Historical Memento of Dalton, Ohio”, August 8, 1940, Carl Lawrence and Dean Norris, pg. 37.

Like the founders of Kidron, the early settlers of Sugarcreek, Ohio, 20 miles from Sugar Creek township, in Tuscarawas County, also came from the canton of Bern in Switzerland. The settlers of Sugarcreek, however, arrived probably a decade or two later than their Kidron neighbors in the 1830s and 1840s, and were part of the Reformed Church – not Mennonite. Sugarcreek had its post office established in 1888, when it received its official name. Sugarcreek was originally named for a local stream running nearby, and the small settlement of Shanesville, also in Tuscarawas County, later merged with Sugarcreek.

== Government ==
The township is governed by a three-member board of trustees, who are elected in November of odd-numbered years to a four-year term beginning on the following January 1. Two are elected in the year after the presidential election and one is elected in the year before it. There is also an elected township fiscal officer, who serves a four-year term beginning on April 1 of the year after the election, which is held in November of the year before the presidential election. Vacancies in the fiscal officership or on the board of trustees are filled by the remaining trustees.
