= Niels Nielsen Fourteen-Side Barn Farm =

- U.S. National Register of Historic Places
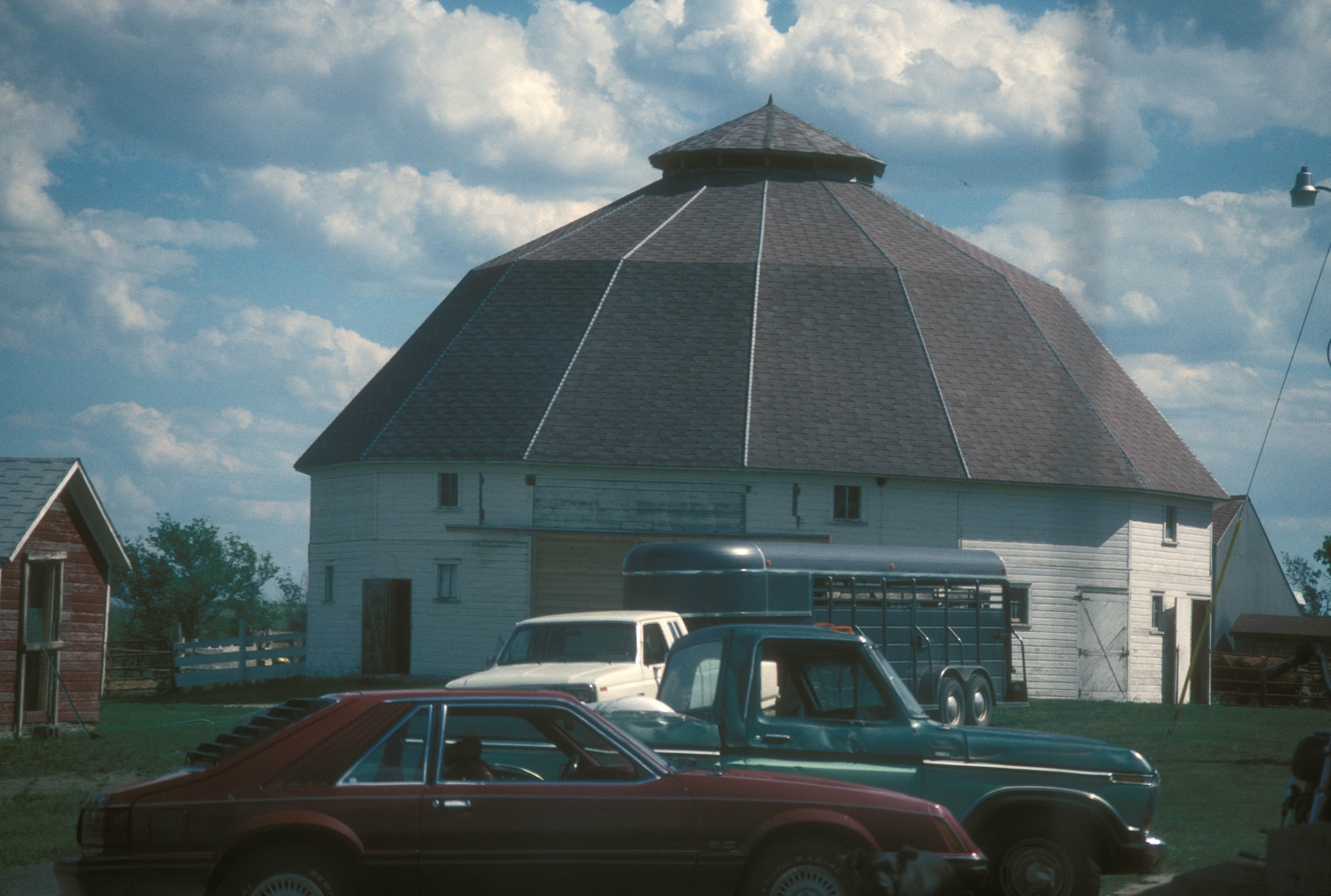

- Location within North Dakota Location within the United States
- Nearest city: Noonan, North Dakota
- Coordinates: 48°49′54″N 102°57′33″W
- Area: less than one acre
- Built: 1914; 112 years ago
- Built by: Nielsen, Niels
- Architect: Chicago House Wrecking Co.
- MPS: North Dakota Round Barns TR
- NRHP reference No.: 86002743
- Added to NRHP: October 7, 1986

The Niels Nielsen Fourteen-Side Barn Farm near Noonan, North Dakota, United States, is a round barn that was built in 1914 by successful Danish immigrant Niels Nielsen. It was built from a kit purchased from the Chicago House Wrecking Company. It was listed on the National Register of Historic Places in 1986.

The barn "is an important representative of the round barn theme because it illustrates the popularity of pre-cut kits sometimes used in their construction."

== See also ==
- Ault–Weygandt Farm: another Chicago House Wrecking Company kit building
