= Chippewa Township, Ohio =

Township in Ohio, US

Chippewa Township, Wayne County, Ohio
- Township
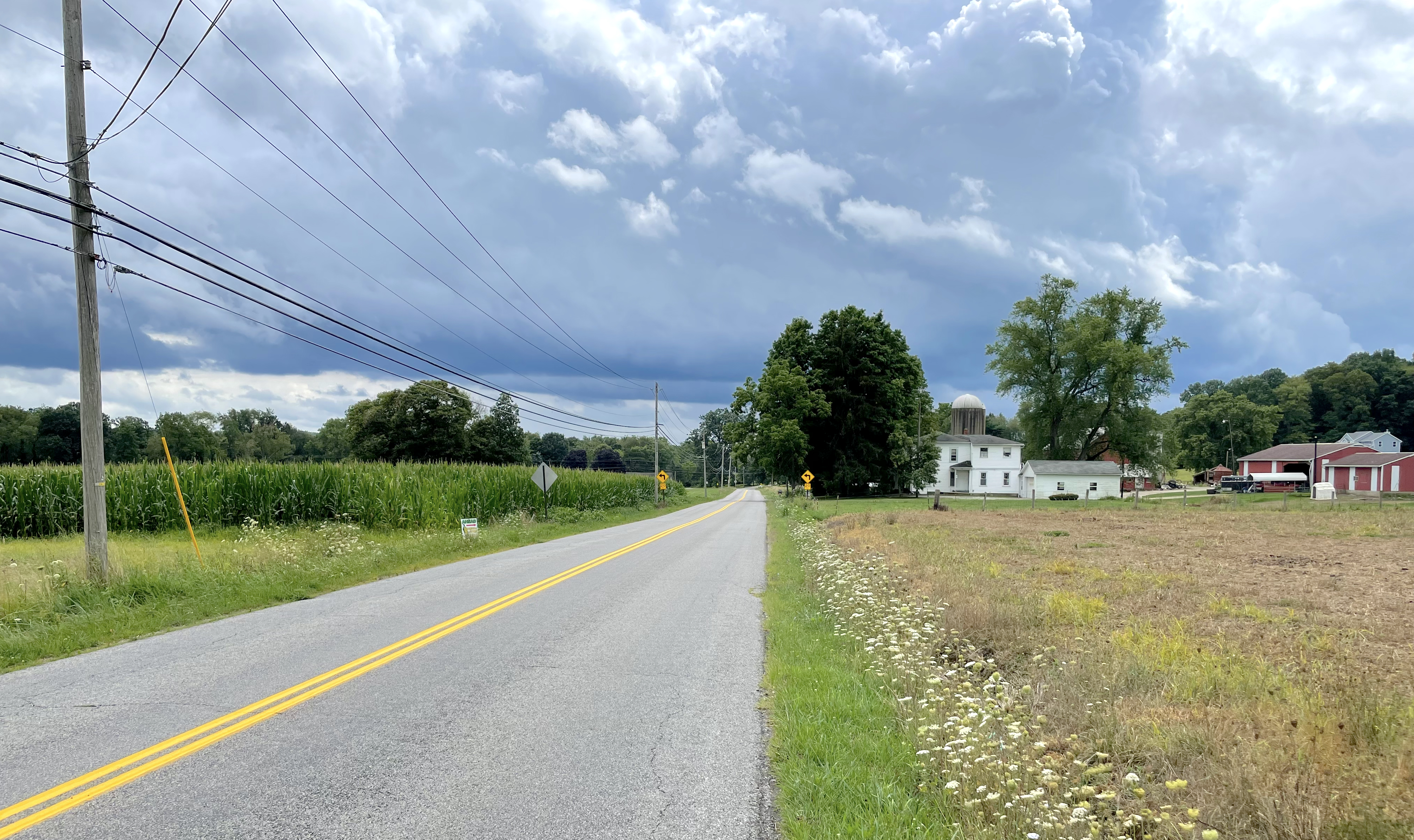
- Farmland south of Doylestown along Calaboone Road

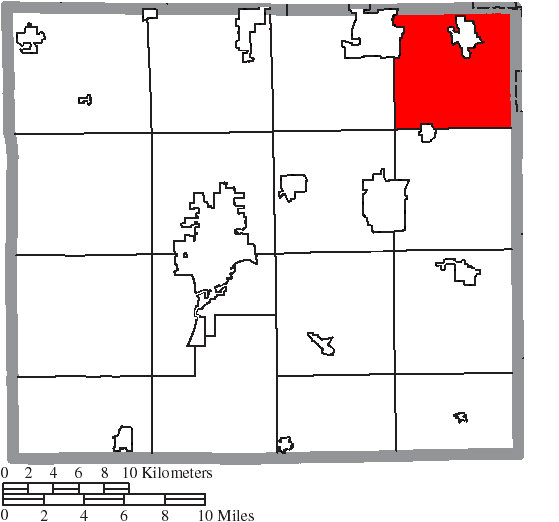
- Location of Chippewa Township in Wayne County
- Coordinates: 40°57′3″N 81°42′16″W
- Country: United States
- State: Ohio
- County: Wayne

Area
  - Total: 36.1 sq mi (93.4 km^{2})
  - Land: 35.9 sq mi (93.0 km^{2})
  - Water: 0.15 sq mi (0.4 km^{2})
- Elevation: 1,201 ft (366 m)

Population (2020)
  - Total: 9,795
  - Density: 273/sq mi (105.3/km^{2})
- Time zone: UTC-5 (Eastern (EST))
  - Summer (DST): UTC-4 (EDT)
- Postal code: 44230
- Area code: 330
- FIPS code: 39-14240
- GNIS feature ID: 1087151
- Website: https://chippewatwp.com/

Chippewa Township is one of the sixteen townships of Wayne County, Ohio, United States. The 2020 census found 9,795 people in the township.

== Geography ==
Located in the northeastern corner of the county, it borders the following townships and cities:

- Wadsworth Township, Medina County - north
- Norton - northeast
- New Franklin - east
- Lawrence Township, Stark County - southeast
- Baughman Township - south
- Green Township - southwest corner
- Milton Township - west

Three municipalities are located in Chippewa Township but are not part of the Township:

- The village of Doylestown, in the north
- Part of the village of Marshallville, in the south
- Part of the city of Rittman, in the northwest

== Name and history ==
It is the only Chippewa Township statewide.

== Government ==
The township is governed by a three-member board of trustees, who are elected in November of odd-numbered years to a four-year term beginning on the following January 1. Two are elected in the year after the presidential election and one is elected in the year before it. There is also an elected township fiscal officer, who serves a four-year term beginning on April 1 of the year after the election, which is held in November of the year before the presidential election. Vacancies in the fiscal officership or on the board of trustees are filled by the remaining trustees.
