= Perry Township, Stark County, Ohio =

Township in Ohio, US

- Township
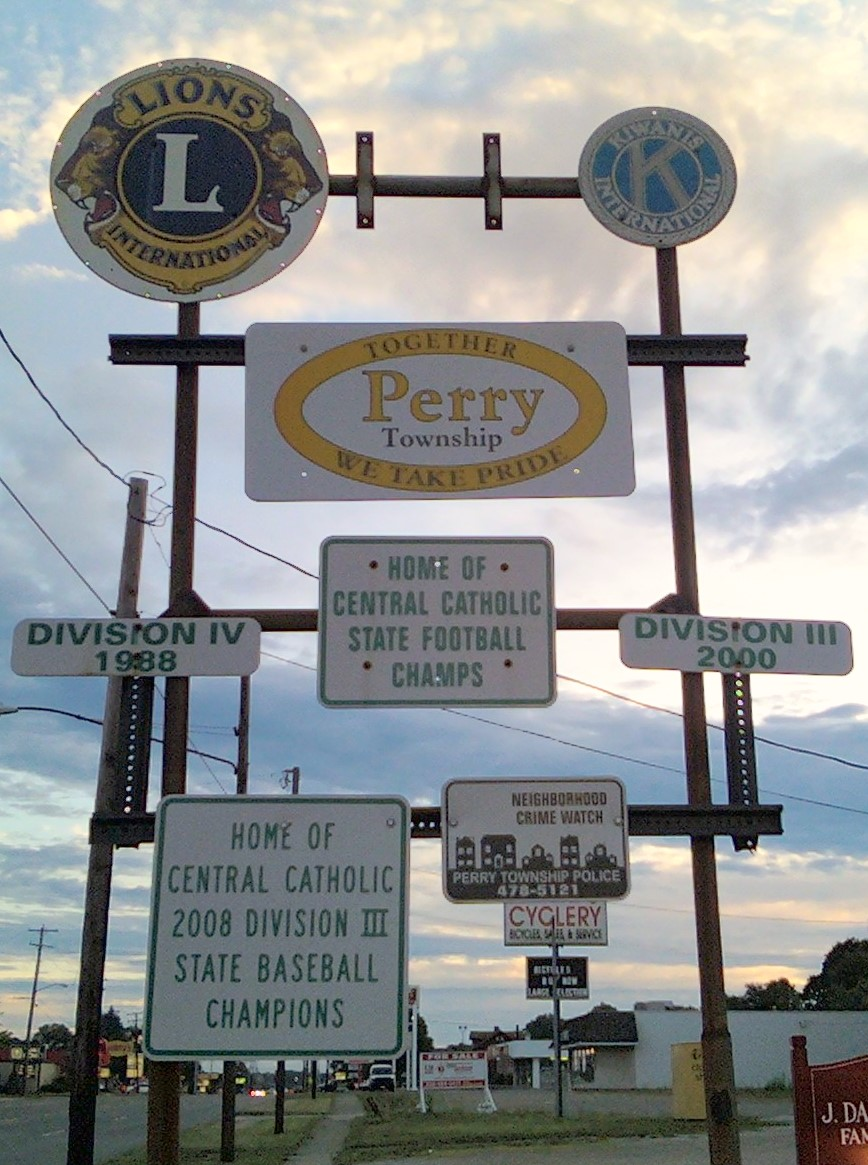
- Welcome sign for Perry Township

- Flag Seal

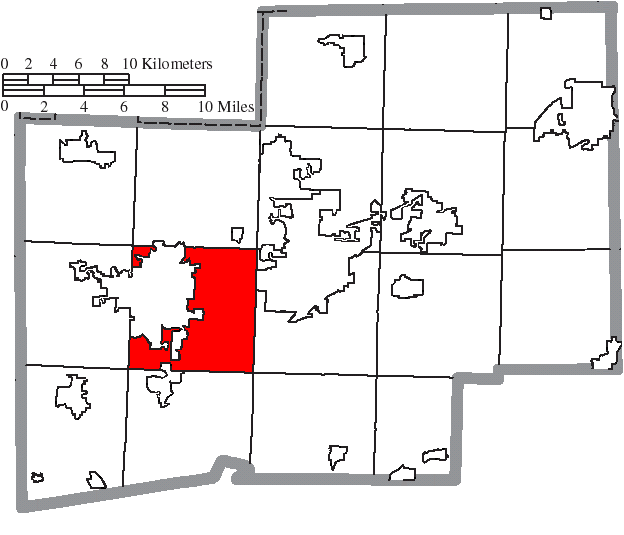
- Location of Perry Township in Stark County
- Coordinates: 40°47′4″N 81°28′0″W
- Country: United States
- State: Ohio
- County: Stark

Area
  - Total: 24.3 sq mi (63.0 km^{2})
  - Land: 24.1 sq mi (62.4 km^{2})
  - Water: 0.23 sq mi (0.6 km^{2})
- Elevation: 1,079 ft (329 m)

Population (2020)
  - Total: 28,389
  - Density: 1,180/sq mi (455/km^{2})
- Time zone: UTC-5 (Eastern (EST))
  - Summer (DST): UTC-4 (EDT)
- FIPS code: 39-62078
- GNIS feature ID: 1086986

Perry Township is one of the seventeen townships of Stark County, Ohio, United States. It is an urban township; the 2020 census found 28,389 people in the township.

== Geography ==
Located in the western part of the county, it borders the following townships:

- Jackson Township - north
- Plain Township - northeast corner
- Canton Township - east
- Pike Township - southeast corner
- Bethlehem Township - south
- Sugar Creek Township - southwest corner
- Tuscarawas Township - west
- Lawrence Township - northwest corner

Several populated places are located in Perry Township:

- Most of the city of Massillon is located in the western half of Perry Township
- A small part of the village of Navarre, in the southwest
- The census-designated places of Perry Heights and Reedurban, in the northeast
- The census-designated place of Richville, in the south

== Name and history ==
On December 7, 1813, Stark County Commissioners named Township 10, Range 9, Perry Township. It was named in honor of Oliver Hazard Perry, hero of the War of 1812. Commander Perry was the victor of a battle on Lake Erie on September 10, 1812.

The first formal settlement in the township was Kendal, founded in 1812 by Thomas Rotch and his wife who were Quakers from Massachusetts. Other settlers arriving with the Rotch Family were Arvine Wales and Charles Skinner. They utilized Sippo Creek and operated a woolen factory and saw mill.

In 1826, James Duncan founded Massillon. The Ohio/Erie Canal was opened to Massillon in 1828 and the entire area and surrounding communities grew exponentially.

Johnny Appleseed (Jonathan Chapman) planted the first orchard in Perry Township on the south side of the Canton–Massillon Road on the Daum Farm. Dr. William Gardner was believed to have been the first physician to settle in Perry Township. He came from New York in 1814. The first religious society was the Religious Society of Friends in Kendal about 1813. Methodists soon populated the area.

In 1833, Perry Township contained three gristmills, seven saw mills, one fulling mill, two tanneries, and sixteen stores.

The first school in the township was established in Kendal. Public schools or common schools came into existence in Perry Township in 1825. By 1875, Perry Township had seven one-room schools.

The construction of Reedurban, Genoa, and Richville Schools brought the one-room era to an end. In the 1950s, Whipple, Watson, Lohr, and Perry High were built. The 1956 opening of Perry High School signifies the first time Perry Local Schools offered secondary education. The growth of the school system continued with the construction of Edison Junior High in 1962 and a vocational wing on the High School in 1964.

Perry Township as a community experienced rapid growth. The agricultural farms from the early days have been reborn as housing developments, commercial and industrial sites, medical facilities, and municipal structures. In the 1970s, housing developments in the township were advertised as "the convenience of the city and the charm of the country".

Affinity Medical Center (Formerly named, and locally referred to as Doctors' Hospital) was built, constructed, and opened in 1963. The hospital contains 272,000 square feet and is built upon 9.27 acres of land, which is situated on Austin Avenue, south of Watson Elementary (whose playground contained a helicopter pad that served for emergency flights to the hospital). It served as Massillon's first emergency medical center and hospital besides nearby Mercy Medical Center, and in the mid 80's, Aultman Hospital, both located in nearby Canton. It operated for more than 40 years until closing its doors in 2008 due to rapidly lowering business and structural decay. The property was later sold in 2010, merely for $1 due to the staggering costs of maintenance and taxes, which was estimated to be about $1,000,000. The parent company, Community Health Systems of Nashville, Tennessee, originally planned to have the building demolished, but decided against it due to the demolition fees which amounted around $700,000. The land is currently for sale again at an undisclosed price. The hospital has been victim to recent vandalism and neglect and was demolished in March 2020. The building is also locally rumored to be haunted, so much so that the Ohio Exploration Society made a documented visit to the building in 2010. The hospital contained the Stark County Morgue until it was shut down. The morgue was speculated to be heavily understaffed and overflowing with bodies at peak times, which fed the accusations of being haunted. In 2022, construction broke ground on the plot of the demolished Affinity building for the new Perry school buildings, this being the new Watson Elementary built right beside the old school.

It is one of twenty-six Perry Townships statewide.

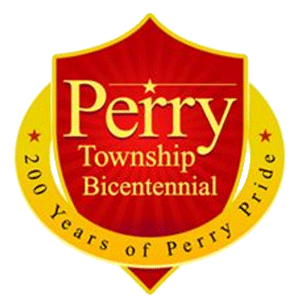
Perry Township celebrated its bicentennial in 2014.

== Government ==
The township is governed by a three-member board of trustees, who are elected in November of odd-numbered years to a four-year term beginning on the following January 1. Two are elected in the year after the presidential election and one is elected in the year before it. There is also an elected township fiscal officer, who serves a four-year term beginning on April 1 of the year after the election, which is held in November of the year before the presidential election. Vacancies in the fiscal officership or on the board of trustees are filled by the remaining trustees.
