= Tuscarawas Township, Stark County, Ohio =

Township in Ohio, US

- Township
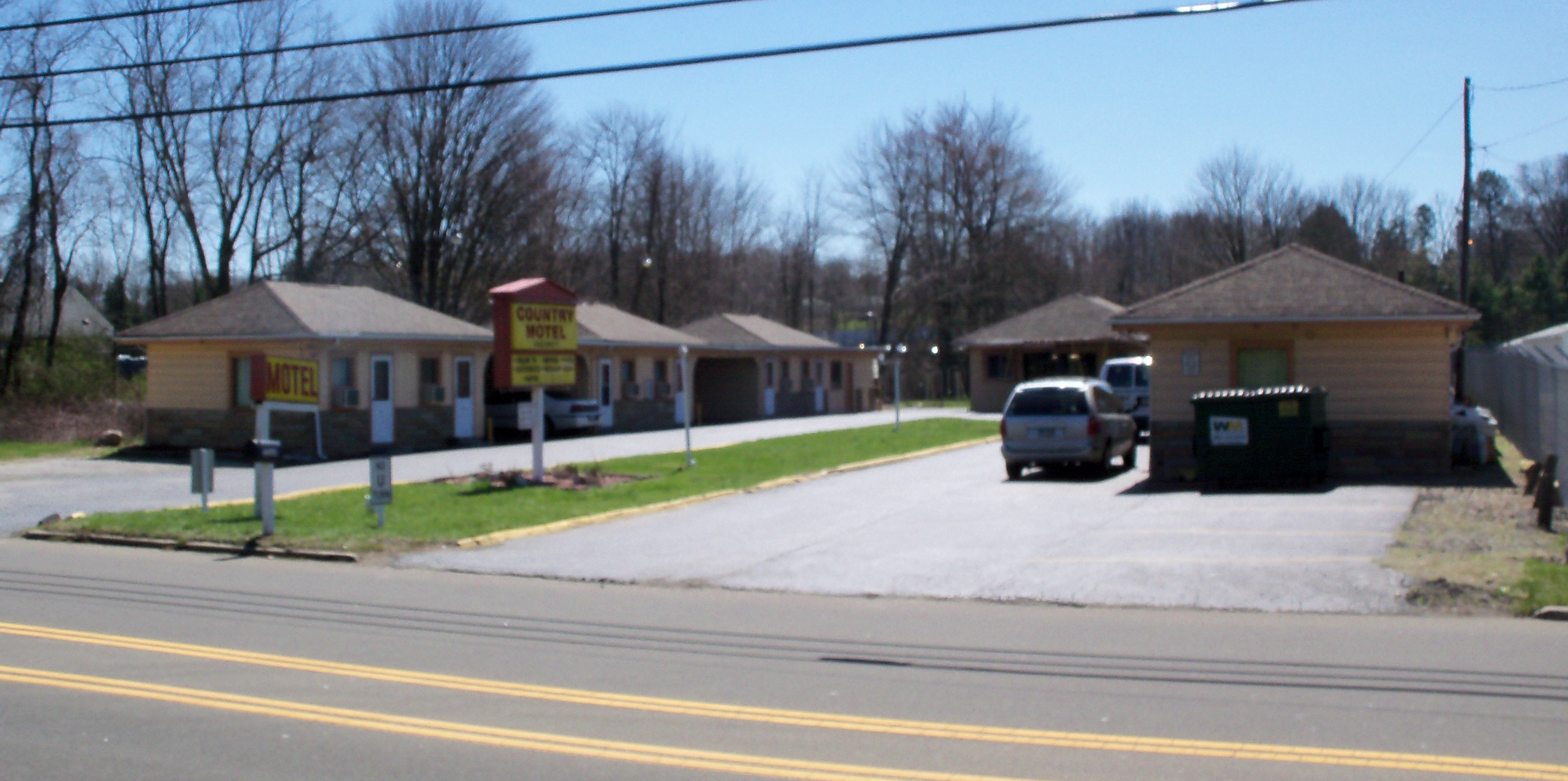
- An old Motor Lodge on the Lincoln Highway

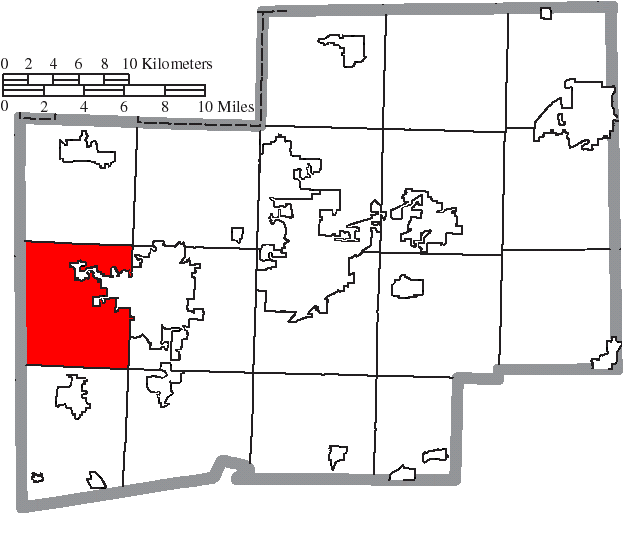
- Location of Tuscarawas Township in Stark County
- Coordinates: 40°47′26″N 81°35′7″W
- Country: United States
- State: Ohio
- County: Stark

Area
  - Total: 30.3 sq mi (78.4 km^{2})
  - Land: 30.2 sq mi (78.3 km^{2})
  - Water: 0 sq mi (0.0 km^{2})
- Elevation: 1,070 ft (326 m)

Population (2020)
  - Total: 5,801
  - Density: 192/sq mi (74.1/km^{2})
- Time zone: UTC-5 (Eastern (EST))
  - Summer (DST): UTC-4 (EDT)
- ZIP code: 44666, 44647, 44618
- Area code: 330
- FIPS code: 39-77910
- GNIS feature ID: 1086991
- Website: https://tuscarawastownship.org/

Tuscarawas Township is one of the seventeen townships of Stark County, Ohio, United States. The 2020 census found 5,801 people in the township.

== Geography ==
Located in the western part of the county, it borders the following townships:

- Lawrence Township - north
- Jackson Township - northeast corner
- Perry Township - east
- Bethlehem Township - southeast corner
- Sugar Creek Township - south
- Sugar Creek Township, Wayne County - west
- Baughman Township, Wayne County - northwest

Part of the city of Massillon is located in eastern Tuscarawas Township.

== Name and history ==
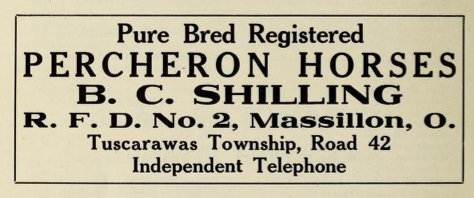
Pure bred registered Percheron horses - B.C. Shilling - Tuscarawas Township - 1915 advertisement

Statewide, the only other Tuscarawas Township is located in Coshocton County. In 1833, Tuscarawas Township consisted of 1 gristmill, 5 saw mills, 1 fulling mill, 2 tanneries, and 2 stores.

== Government ==
The township is governed by a three-member board of trustees, who are elected in November of odd-numbered years to a four-year term beginning on the following January 1. Two are elected in the year after the presidential election and one is elected in the year before it. There is also an elected township fiscal officer, who serves a four-year term beginning on April 1 of the year after the election, which is held in November of the year before the presidential election. Vacancies in the fiscal officership or on the board of trustees are filled by the remaining trustees.
