= Baughman Township, Ohio =

Township in Ohio, US

- Township
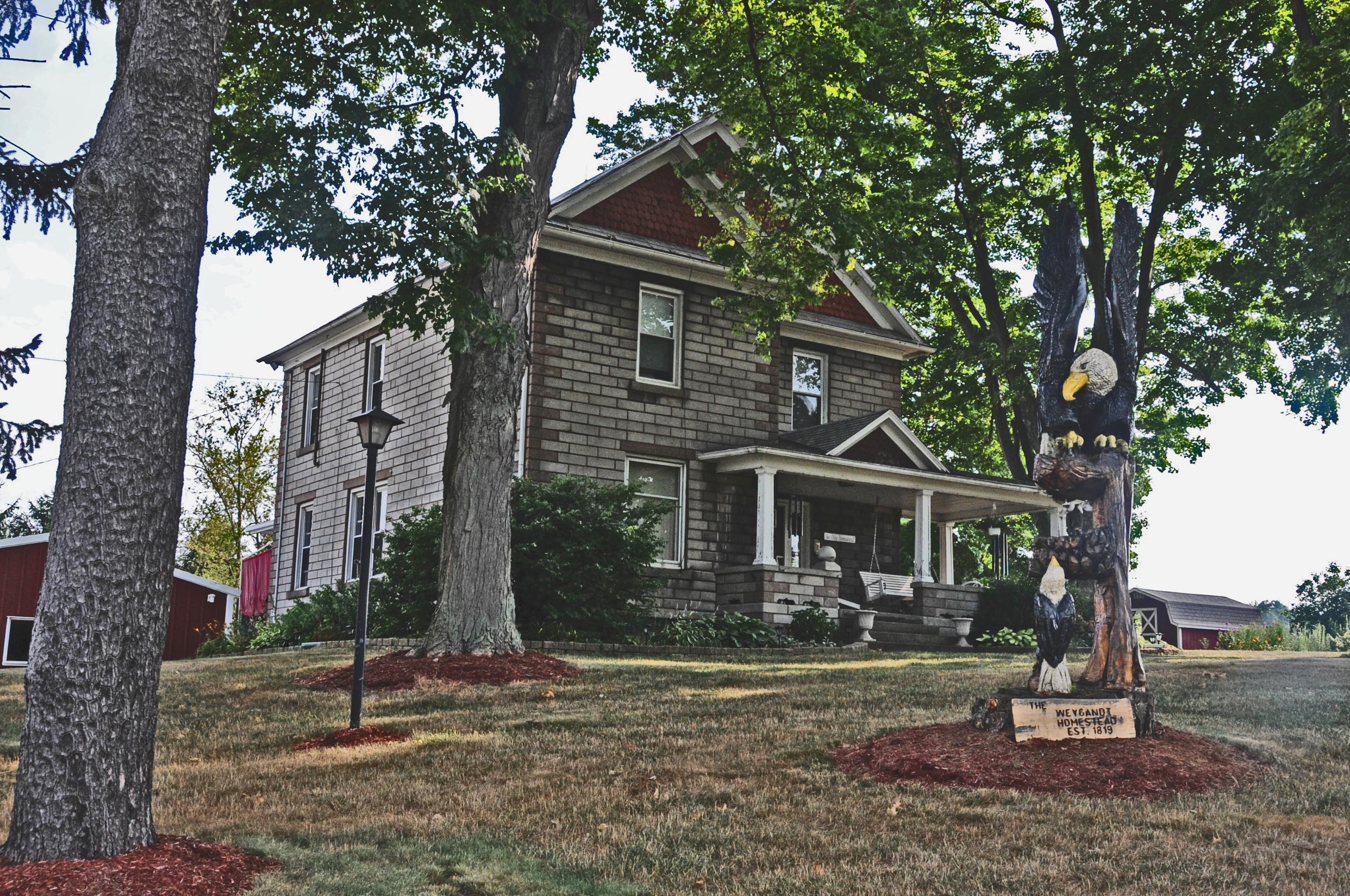
- Ault-Weygandt Farmhouse

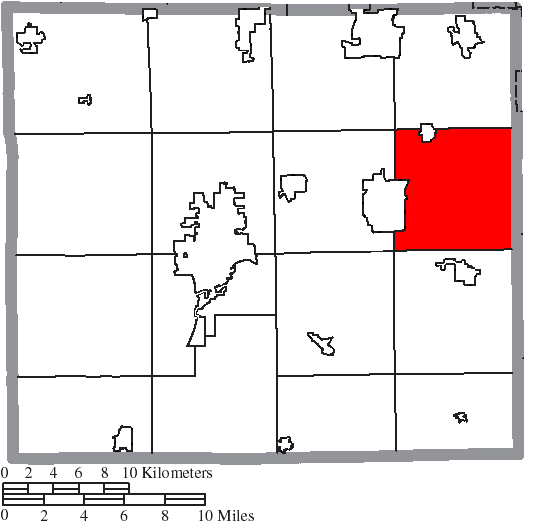
- Location of Baughman Township in Wayne County
- Coordinates: 40°51′31″N 81°43′1″W
- Country: United States
- State: Ohio
- County: Wayne

Area
  - Total: 36.3 sq mi (94.0 km^{2})
  - Land: 36.2 sq mi (93.8 km^{2})
  - Water: 0.077 sq mi (0.2 km^{2})
- Elevation: 1,079 ft (329 m)

Population (2020)
  - Total: 4,799
  - Density: 133/sq mi (51.2/km^{2})
- Time zone: UTC-5 (Eastern (EST))
  - Summer (DST): UTC-4 (EDT)
- FIPS code: 39-04276
- GNIS feature ID: 1087148
- Website: http://www.baughmantownship.com/

Baughman Township is one of the sixteen townships of Wayne County, Ohio, United States. The 2020 census found 4,799 people in the township

== Geography ==
Located in the eastern part of the county, it borders the following townships:

- Chippewa Township - north
- Lawrence Township, Stark County - east
- Tuscarawas Township, Stark County - southeast
- Sugar Creek Township - south
- East Union Township - southwest corner
- Green Township - west
- Milton Township - northwest corner

Parts of two municipalities are located in Baughman Township: the village of Marshallville in the north, and the city of Orrville in the west.

== Name and history ==
It is the only Baughman Township nationwide.

== Government ==
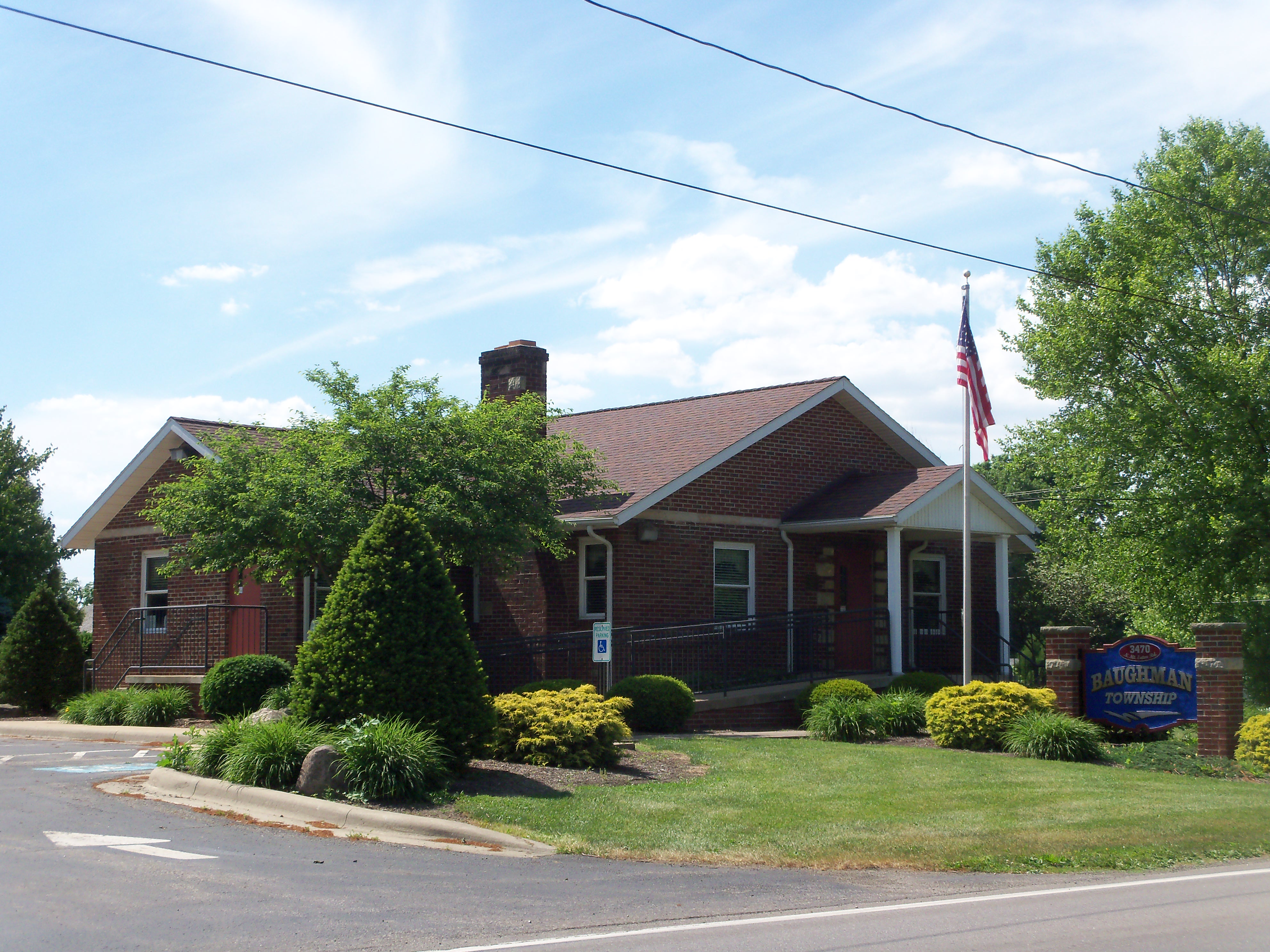
Baughman Town Hall

The township is governed by a three-member board of trustees, who are elected in November of odd-numbered years to a four-year term beginning on the following January 1. Two are elected in the year after the presidential election and one is elected in the year before it. There is also an elected township fiscal officer, who serves a four-year term beginning on April 1 of the year after the election, which is held in November of the year before the presidential election. Vacancies in the fiscal officership or on the board of trustees are filled by the remaining trustees.
