= Milton Township, Wayne County, Ohio =

Township in Ohio, US

- Township
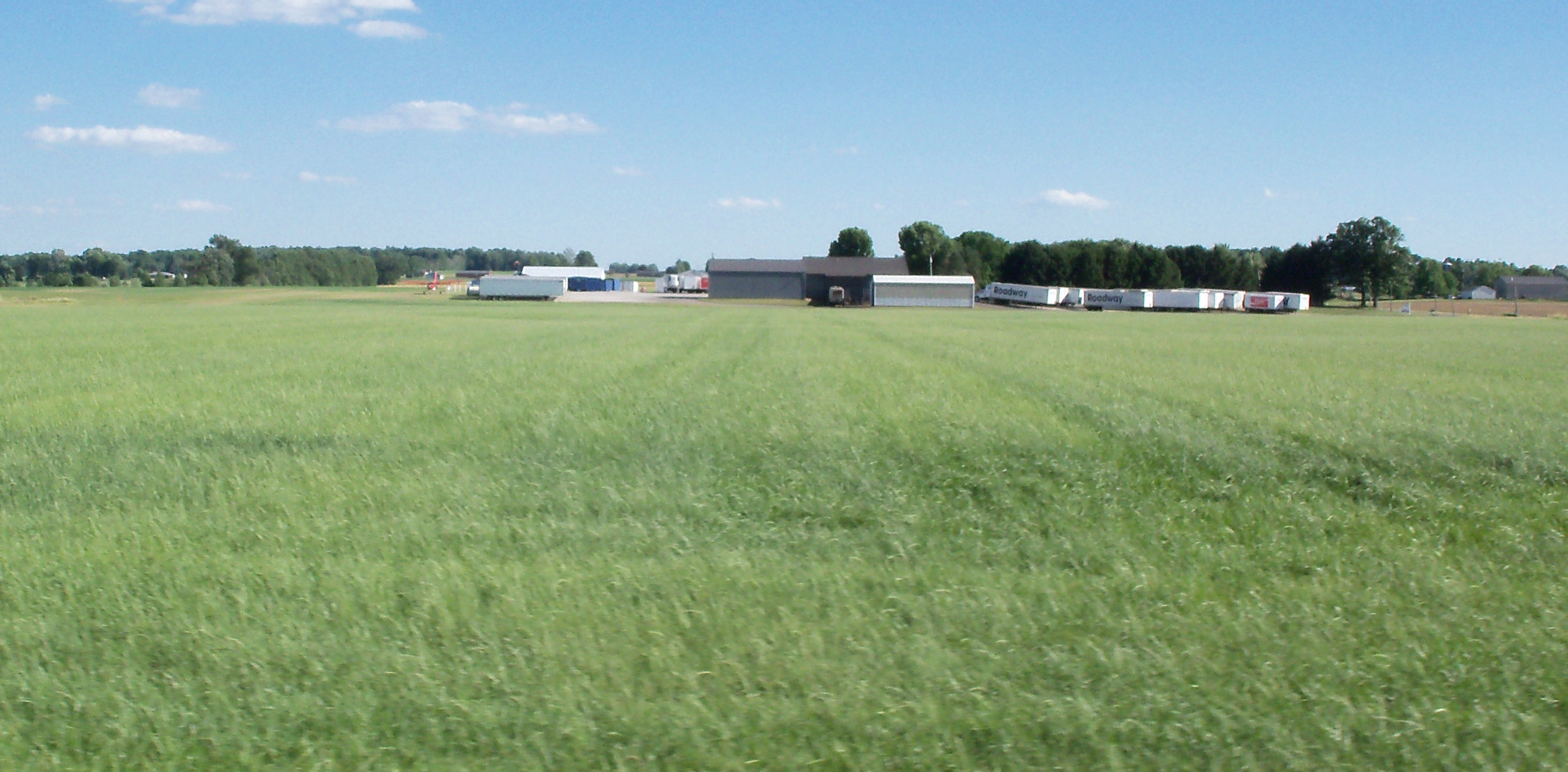
- Skydiving airfield located south of Rittman

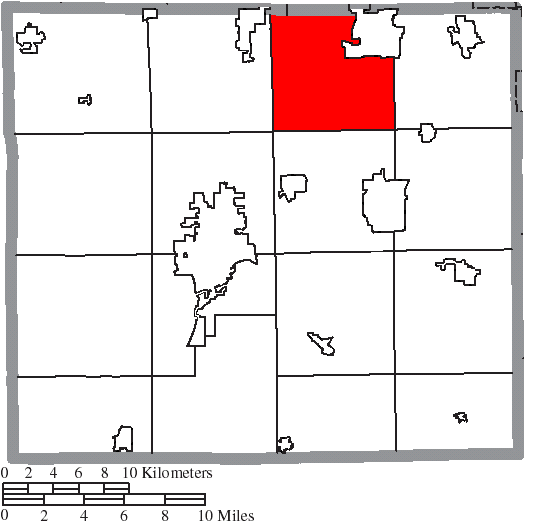
- Location of Milton Township in Wayne County
- Coordinates: 40°57′43″N 81°48′28″W
- Country: United States
- State: Ohio
- County: Wayne

Area
  - Total: 36.1 sq mi (93.5 km^{2})
  - Land: 35.9 sq mi (93.0 km^{2})
  - Water: 0.19 sq mi (0.5 km^{2})
- Elevation: 1,079 ft (329 m)

Population (2020)
  - Total: 2,964
  - Density: 83/sq mi (31.9/km^{2})
- Time zone: UTC-5 (Eastern (EST))
  - Summer (DST): UTC-4 (EDT)
- FIPS code: 39-50666
- GNIS feature ID: 1087157
- Website: https://miltonsterling.org/

Milton Township is one of the sixteen townships of Wayne County, Ohio, United States. The 2020 census found 2,964 people in the township.

== Geography ==
Located in the northern part of the county, it borders the following townships:

- Guilford Township, Medina County - north
- Wadsworth Township, Medina County - northeast
- Chippewa Township - east
- Baughman Township - southeast corner
- Green Township - south
- Wayne Township - southwest corner
- Canaan Township - west
- Westfield Township, Medina County - northwest corner

Most of the city of Rittman is located in northeastern Milton Township, and the census-designated place of Sterling lies in the northwestern part of the township.

== Name and history ==
It is one of five Milton Townships statewide.

== Government ==
The township is governed by a three-member board of trustees, who are elected in November of odd-numbered years to a four-year term beginning on the following January 1. Two are elected in the year after the presidential election and one is elected in the year before it. There is also an elected township fiscal officer, who serves a four-year term beginning on April 1 of the year after the election, which is held in November of the year before the presidential election. Vacancies in the fiscal officership or on the board of trustees are filled by the remaining trustees.
