= East Union, Wayne County, Ohio =

Unincorporated community in Ohio, U.S.

Coordinates: 40°47′45″N 81°49′02″W

East Union is an unincorporated community in Wayne County, in the U.S. state of Ohio.

== History ==
The community is located within East Union Township, which was named after Union, Maine. A post office called East Union was established in 1831, and remained in operation until 1907. Besides the post office, East Union had a country store.
