= Medina Masonic Temple and Medina Theater =

- U.S. National Register of Historic Places
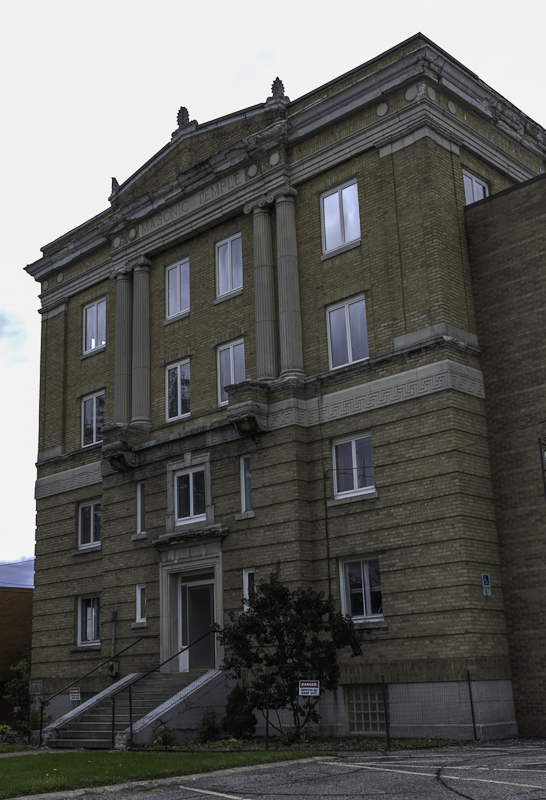
- Medina Masonic Temple

- Location within Ohio Location within the United States
- Location: 120 N. Elmwood Ave. and 139 W. Liberty St., Medina, Ohio
- Coordinates: 41°08′23″N 81°51′56″W
- Area: less than one acre
- Built: 1924
- Architect: Ridley and Glazier; Burrows, George Howard
- Architectural style: Greek Ionic
- NRHP reference No.: 02001210
- Added to NRHP: October 22, 2002

The Medina Masonic Temple and Medina Theater in Medina, Ohio was the first movie theater in Medina. Constructed in 1924 this two screen auditorium operated from 1937 until its closure in 2000. It was listed on the National Register of Historic Places in 2002.

The city of Medina purchased the building in July 2015 and voted to demolish it in July 2016 to make a gravel parking lot. The area has since been converted to a parking garage.
