= St. Paul's Episcopal Church (Medina, Ohio) =

Historic church in Ohio, United States

- U.S. National Register of Historic Places
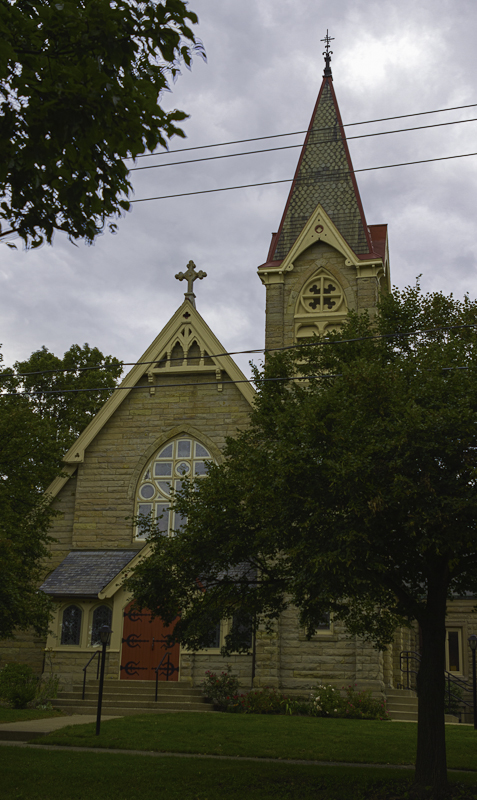
- Front of the church

- Location within Ohio Location within the United States
- Location: 317 E. Liberty St., Medina, Ohio
- Coordinates: 41°8′22″N 81°51′38″W
- Area: 1.7 acres (0.69 ha)
- Built: 1884
- Architect: Gordon W. Lloyd
- Architectural style: Gothic Revival
- NRHP reference No.: 82003613
- Added to NRHP: June 1, 1982

St. Paul's Episcopal Church is a historic Episcopal parish in Medina, Ohio, United States. Formed in the 1810s as Medina's first church, it worships in a high Gothic Revival church building constructed in the 1880s, which has been named a historic site.

In 2018, the church reported 561 members; in 2023, it reported 474 members. No membership statistics were reported in 2024 national parochial reports. Plate and pledge financial support reported by the church in 2023 was $265,819. Average Sunday Attendance (ASA) reported in 2024 was 76 persons. This was a relative decrease on ASA of 105 in 2015.

== Parish history ==
The first preacher in Medina Township was an Episcopal priest, R. Searle, who arrived from Connecticut in 1817; his first recorded sermon in the township was preached at the house of Zenas Hamilton on 11 March of that year. Searle organized a parish dedicated to St. Paul, and the first church building was constructed on 10 April; because of the scarcity of resources, this building was used for a time as a union church by both the Episcopalians and the Congregationalists. As Medina increased in population, the place of worship was moved there from its original remote location. During their earliest years in Medina, the parishioners worshipped in the courthouse; this condition endured until the construction of a frame church building, which was completed in an uncertain year during the episcopacy of Bishop McIlvaine. In the 1880s, the church decided to construct a replacement structure; it was consecrated in 1887, three years after construction was completed.

== Architecture ==
The present church building is the 1887 structure, for which the parish solicited prominent architect Gordon W. Lloyd after learning of his previous commissions in Michigan, Pennsylvania, and other parts of Ohio. One of Lloyd's last church buildings, it demonstrates the influence of Richard Upjohn. The walls are sandstone, built on a stone foundation and covered with a slate roof. Its floor plan is reminiscent of many other Anglican churches, with the typical tower atop the narthex and the rectangular nave. In a similar manner, the building is constructed in the shape of a cross, due to the construction of transepts connected to the chancel. Even the tower is reminiscent of traditional Anglican churches, due to the presence of a belfry with a steep pyramid-shaped roof and louvred openings. The main body of the church features ogive windows and a gabled facade, while small cloverleaf-shaped windows are placed in the tower above the entrance and below the main windows.

== Preservation ==
In 1982, St. Paul's Church was listed on the National Register of Historic Places. One of ten Medina locations on the Register, it qualified because of its historically significant architecture, as it is Medina County's best Gothic Revival church building.

St. Paul's is part of the Summit Mission Area of the Diocese of Ohio. The current rector is Kelly Aughenbaugh.
