= East Union Township, Ohio =

Township in Ohio, US

East Union Township, Wayne County, Ohio
- Township
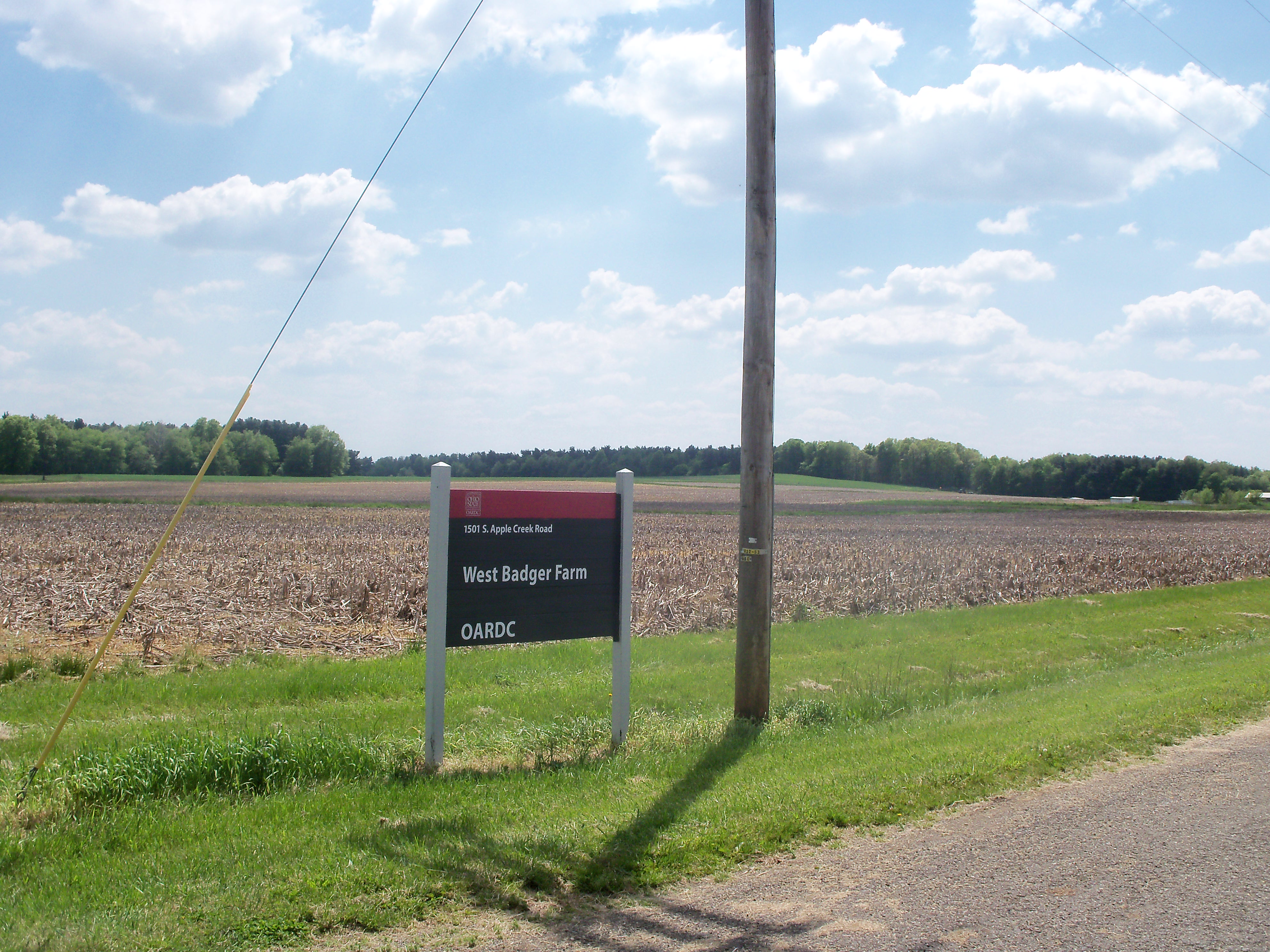
- This farm north of Apple Creek is part of the OARDC

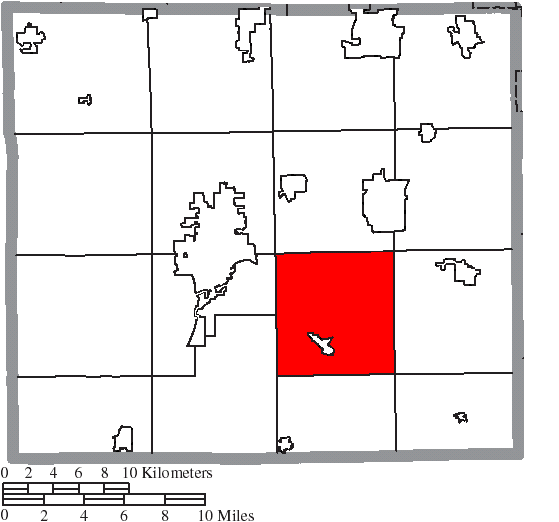
- Location of East Union Township in Wayne County
- Coordinates: 40°45′44″N 81°49′13″W
- Country: United States
- State: Ohio
- County: Wayne

Area
  - Total: 35.6 sq mi (92.2 km^{2})
  - Land: 35.6 sq mi (92.2 km^{2})
  - Water: 0 sq mi (0.0 km^{2})
- Elevation: 1,158 ft (353 m)

Population (2020)
  - Total: 6,946
  - Density: 195/sq mi (75.3/km^{2})
- Time zone: UTC-5 (Eastern (EST))
  - Summer (DST): UTC-4 (EDT)
- FIPS code: 39-24136
- GNIS feature ID: 1087154
- Website: https://www.oheut.com/

East Union Township is one of the sixteen townships of Wayne County, Ohio, United States. The 2020 census found 6,946 people in the township.

== Geography ==
Located in the central part of the county, it borders the following townships:

- Green Township - north
- Baughman Township - northeast corner
- Sugar Creek Township - east
- Paint Township - southeast corner
- Salt Creek Township - south
- Franklin Township - southwest
- Wooster Township - west
- Wayne Township - northwest corner

The unincorporated community of East Union, from which the township derives its name, is located in the northern area of the township. Riceland, an unincorporated community situated on U.S. Route 30, straddles the border between East Union Township to the west and Sugar Creek Township to the east. The mobile home community of Wooster Rolling Wheels is also located in the township. Another mobile home community, Whispering Pines Estates, was located in the aforementioned Riceland until its closure and removal in August 2021.

The village of Apple Creek is located in southern East Union Township.

== Name and history ==
East Union Township was established in 1814, and named after Union, Maine, the native home of a first settler. It is the only East Union Township statewide.

== Government ==
The township is governed by a three-member board of trustees, who are elected in November of odd-numbered years to a four-year term beginning on the following January 1. Two are elected in the year after the presidential election and one is elected in the year before it. There is also an elected township fiscal officer, who serves a four-year term beginning on April 1 of the year after the election, which is held in November of the year before the presidential election. Vacancies in the fiscal officership or on the board of trustees are filled by the remaining trustees.
