= Perry Heights, Ohio =

- Census-designated place
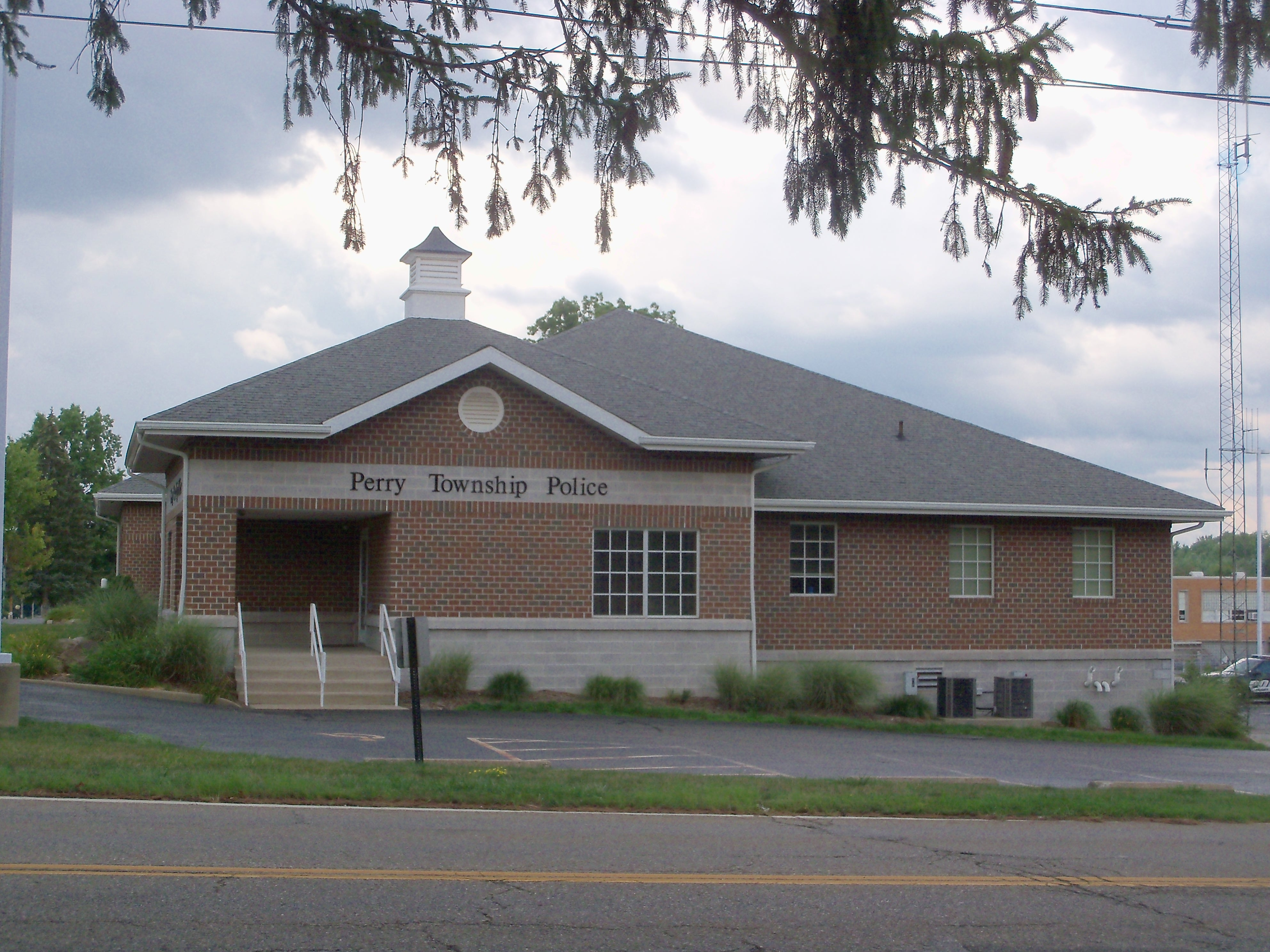
- Perry Township Police Department

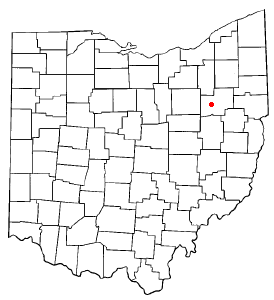
- Location of Perry Heights, Ohio
- Coordinates: 40°47′52″N 81°28′05″W
- Country: United States
- State: Ohio
- County: Stark
- Township: Perry

Area
  - Total: 2.90 sq mi (7.51 km^{2})
  - Land: 2.86 sq mi (7.40 km^{2})
  - Water: 0.042 sq mi (0.11 km^{2})
- Elevation: 1,083 ft (330 m)

Population (2020)
  - Total: 8,391
  - Density: 2,936.2/sq mi (1,133.69/km^{2})
- Time zone: UTC-5 (Eastern (EST))
  - Summer (DST): UTC-4 (EDT)
- FIPS code: 39-62134
- GNIS feature ID: 2393183

Perry Heights is a census-designated place in Stark County, Ohio, United States. The population was 8,391 at the 2020 census. It is part of the Canton–Massillon metropolitan area.

== Geography ==
According to the United States Census Bureau, the CDP has a total area of 3.0 square miles (7.8 km^{2}), of which 2.9 square miles (7.5 km^{2}) is land and 0.04 square miles (0.10 km^{2}) (1.35%) is water.

== Demographics ==
Historical population
Census	Pop.	Note	%±
2000	8,900		—
2010	8,441		−5.2%
2020	8,391		−0.6%
U.S. Decennial Census

As of the census of 2000, there were 8,900 people, 3,545 households, and 2,456 families residing in the CDP. The population density was 3,050.9 inhabitants per square mile (1,178.0/km^{2}). There were 3,674 housing units at an average density of 1,259.4 per square mile (486.3/km^{2}). The racial makeup of the CDP was 95.17% White, 2.78% African American, 0.31% Native American, 0.24% Asian, 0.57% from other races, and 0.93% from two or more races. Hispanic or Latino of any race were 1.44% of the population.

There were 3,545 households, out of which 31.0% had children under the age of 18 living with them, 54.4% were married couples living together, 11.2% had a female householder with no husband present, and 30.7% were non-families. 25.7% of all households were made up of individuals, and 10.7% had someone living alone who was 65 years of age or older. The average household size was 2.44 and the average family size was 2.93.

In the CDP the population was spread out, with 23.2% under the age of 18, 7.9% from 18 to 24, 28.2% from 25 to 44, 24.5% from 45 to 64, and 16.1% who were 65 years of age or older. The median age was 39 years. For every 100 females there were 91.3 males. For every 100 females age 18 and over, there were 85.8 males.

The median income for a household in the CDP was $41,674, and the median income for a family was $47,423. Males had a median income of $37,028 versus $23,054 for females. The per capita income for the CDP was $20,333. About 5.1% of families and 6.9% of the population were below the poverty line, including 8.9% of those under age 18 and 4.0% of those age 65 or over.
