= Ault–Weygandt Farm =

- Ault-Weygandt Farm
- U.S. National Register of Historic Places
- U.S. Historic district
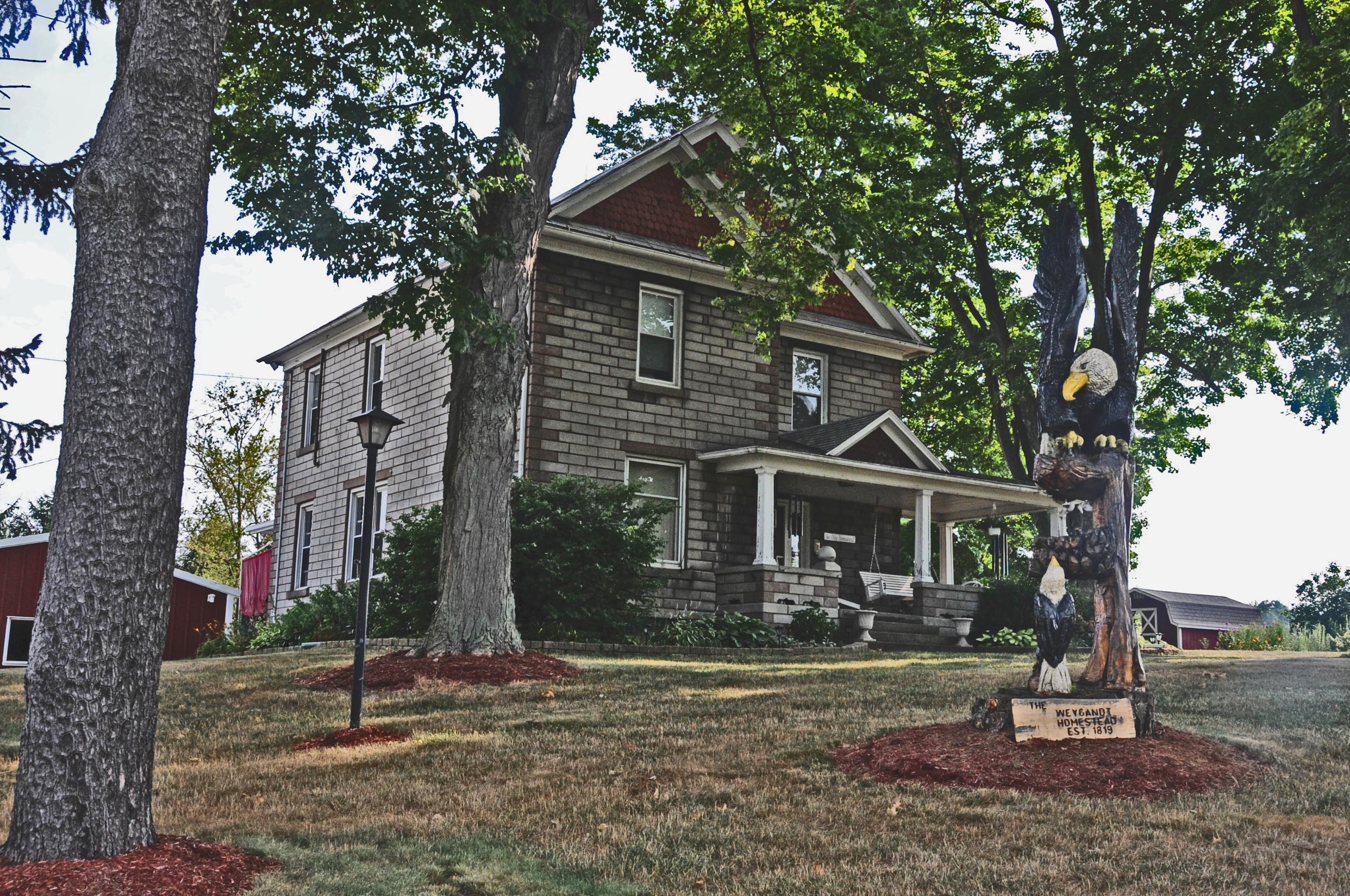

- Location within Ohio Location within the United States
- Nearest city: Orrville, Ohio
- Coordinates: 40°52′32″N 81°42′51″W
- Architect: Chicago House Wrecking Company and Orrville Cast Stone Company
- Architectural style: Queen Anne and Colonial Revival
- NRHP reference No.: 01001481
- Added to NRHP: 2002-01-14

Ault–Weygandt Farm is a registered historic district near Orrville, Ohio, listed in the National Register on 2002-01-14. It contains 2 contributing buildings.

== Historic uses ==
- Single Dwelling
- Storage
- Agricultural Fields
- Animal Facility
- Agricultural Outbuildings

== See also ==
- Niels Nielsen Fourteen-Side Barn Farm: another Chicago House Wrecking Company kit building
