= James Akey Farm =

Historic house in Ohio, United States

- U.S. National Register of Historic Places
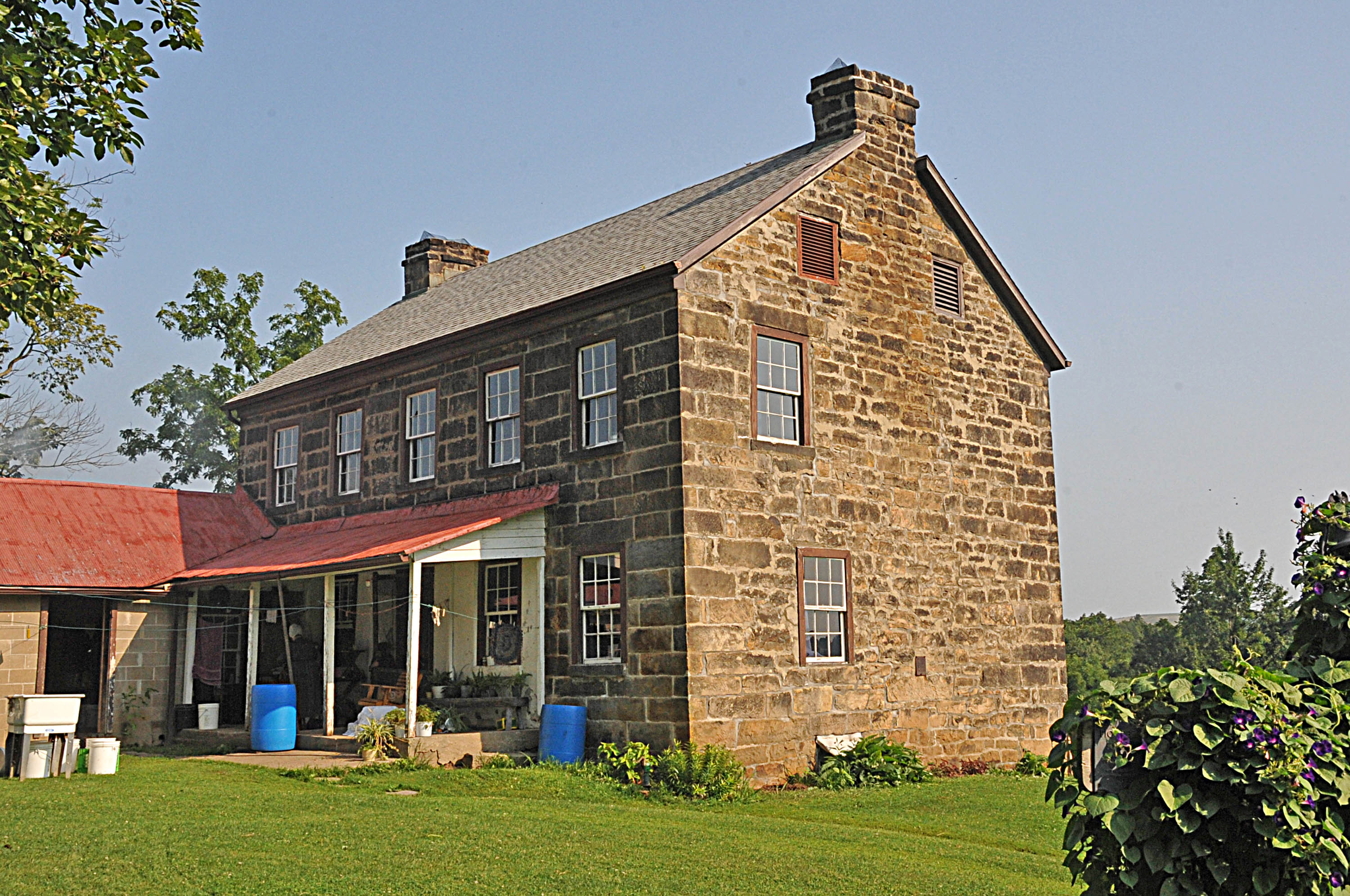

- Location within Ohio Location within the United States
- Location: North of Brenneman Rd., southeast of Mt. Eaton
- Nearest city: Mount Eaton, Ohio
- Coordinates: 40°40′40.6″N 81°39′18.4″W
- Area: 83.8 acres (33.9 ha)
- Built: 1822
- NRHP reference No.: 78002212
- Added to NRHP: December 22, 1978

The James Akey Farm is a historic farmstead near the village of Mount Eaton in southeastern Wayne County, Ohio, United States. Composed of a farmhouse and several significantly newer outbuildings, it was constructed as the home of Irish immigrant James Akey and his family, who moved to the area in the early 19th century and built the present farmhouse in 1822. The farmhouse is primarily a sandstone structure, although with some newer elements of concrete; its roof is made of metal. A plain structure without ornate architectural details, it is a large residence that architectural historians have seen as imposing and highly proportional.

Located in a rural valley, the Akey farm is far from any other farmsteads. After a period of Amish ownership, during which most of the present outbuildings were constructed, the farm came under the ownership of the Wilderness Center, and it has accordingly been converted into a museum known as the "Stark Wilderness Center Pioneer Farm." The only Wilderness Center property in southeastern Wayne County, it was listed on the National Register of Historic Places in 1978, due both to its well-preserved historic architecture and its place in local history.
