= Rittman, Ohio =

- City
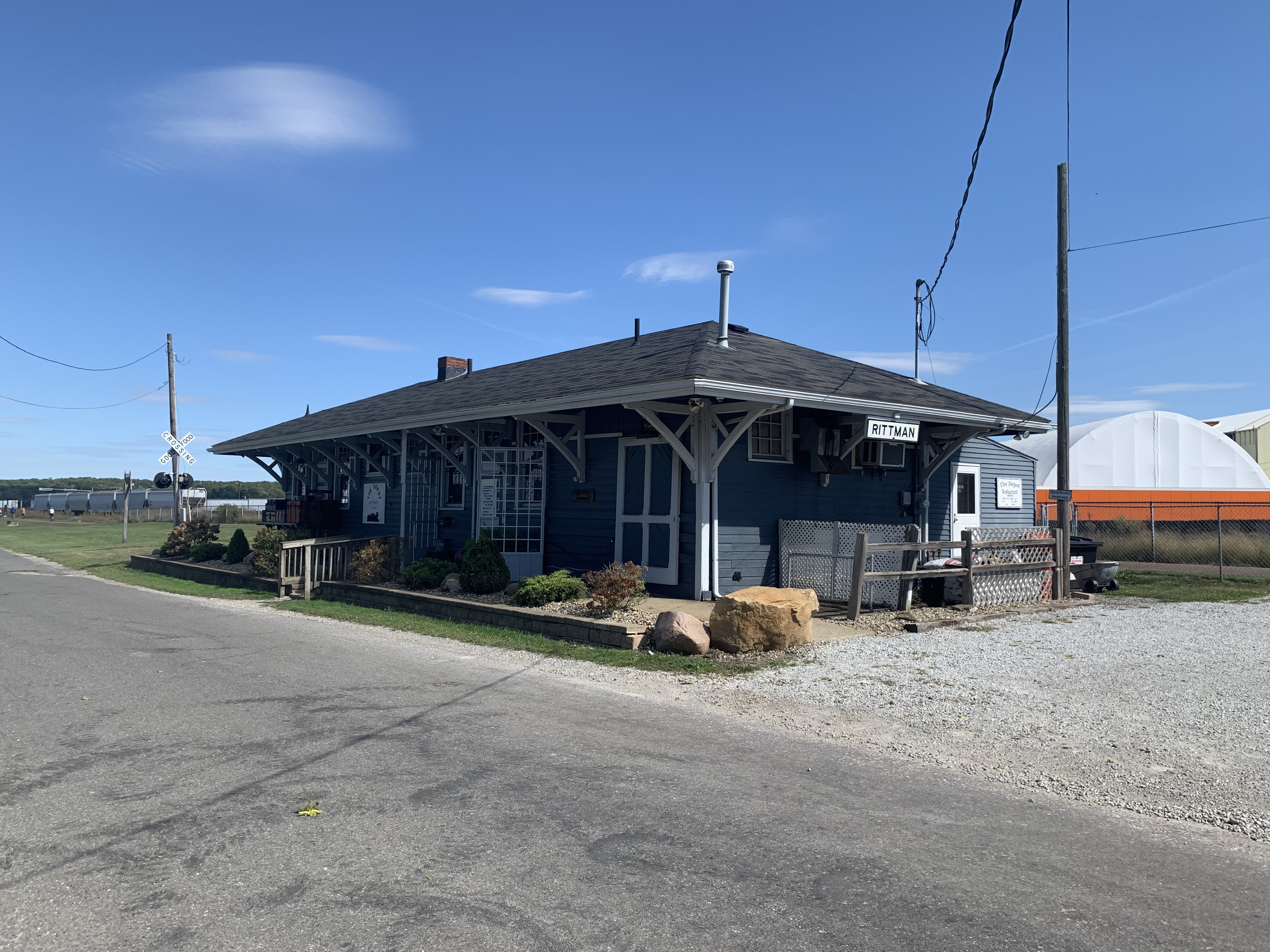
- The former Erie Railroad depot in Rittman, now a restaurant.

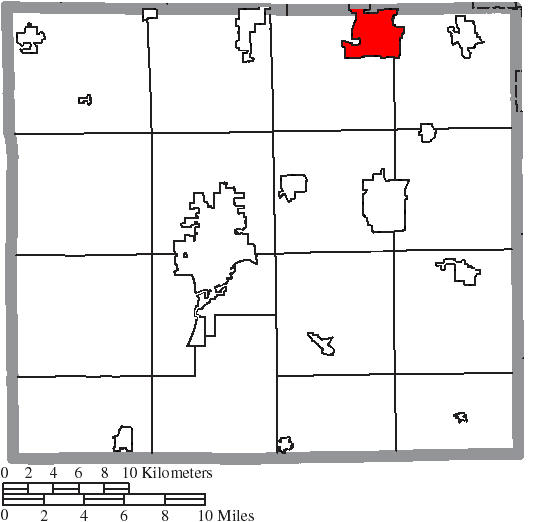
- Location of Rittman in Wayne County

- Location within Ohio Location within the United States
- Coordinates: 40°59′10″N 81°47′45″W
- Country: United States
- State: Ohio
- Counties: Wayne, Medina

Area
  - Total: 6.43 sq mi (16.65 km^{2})
  - Land: 6.30 sq mi (16.31 km^{2})
  - Water: 0.13 sq mi (0.34 km^{2})
- Elevation: 1,066 ft (325 m)

Population (2020)
  - Total: 6,131
  - Density: 973.5/sq mi (375.87/km^{2})
- Time zone: UTC-5 (Eastern (EST))
  - Summer (DST): UTC-4 (EDT)
- ZIP code: 44270
- Area codes: 330 and 234
- FIPS code: 39-67356
- GNIS feature ID: 2396382
- Website: http://www.rittman.com/

Rittman is a city in Medina and Wayne counties in the U.S. state of Ohio. All but a small portion of the city is in Wayne County, within commuting distance of Akron, Canton and Cleveland. The population was 6,131 at the 2020 census.

== Geography ==
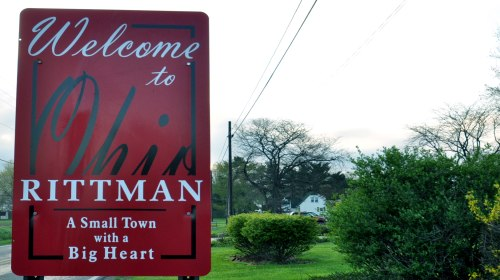
Rittman, Ohio City Limits Sign.

According to the United States Census Bureau, the city has a total area of 6.49 square miles (16.81 km^{2}), of which 6.43 square miles (16.65 km^{2}) is land and 0.06 square miles (0.16 km^{2}) is water.

== Demographics ==
Historical population
Census	Pop.	Note	%±
1920	1,803		—
1930	2,785		54.5%
1940	2,770		−0.5%
1950	3,810		37.5%
1960	5,410		42.0%
1970	6,308		16.6%
1980	6,063		−3.9%
1990	6,147		1.4%
2000	6,314		2.7%
2010	6,491		2.8%
2020	6,131		−5.5%
2025 (est.)	6,120		−0.2%

=== 2010 census ===
At the 2010 census there were 6,491 people, 2,547 households, and 1,763 families living in the city. The population density was 1,009.5 inhabitants per square mile (389.8/km^{2}). There were 2,752 housing units at an average density of 428.0 per square mile (165.3/km^{2}). The racial makeup of the city was 97.2% White, 0.4% African American, 0.2% Native American, 0.4% Asian, 0.2% from other races, and 1.6% from two or more races. Hispanic or Latino of any race were 1.2%.

Of the 2,547 households 33.5% had children under the age of 18 living with them, 51.6% were married couples living together, 11.9% had a female householder with no husband present, 5.8% had a male householder with no wife present, and 30.8% were non-families. 26.2% of households were one person and 10.8% were one person aged 65 or older. The average household size was 2.52 and the average family size was 3.01.

The median age was 38.5 years. 23.9% of residents were under the age of 18; 8% were between the ages of 18 and 24; 26.9% were from 25 to 44; 26.5% were from 45 to 64; and 14.7% were 65 or older. The gender makeup of the city was 48.9% male and 51.1% female.

=== 2000 census ===
At the 2000 census there were 6,314 people, 2,424 households, and 1,711 families living in the city. The population density was 1,046.9 inhabitants per square mile (404.2/km^{2}). There were 2,518 housing units at an average density of 417.5 per square mile (161.2/km^{2}). The racial makeup of the city was 98.13% White, 0.10% African American, 0.22% Native American, 0.38% Asian, 0.27% from other races, and 0.90% from two or more races. Hispanic or Latino of any race were 0.89%.

Of the 2,424 households 34.6% had children under the age of 18 living with them, 55.8% were married couples living together, 10.8% had a female householder with no husband present, and 29.4% were non-families. 25.5% of households were one person and 10.8% were one person aged 65 or older. The average household size was 2.57 and the average family size was 3.10.

The age distribution was 26.5% under the age of 18, 8.2% from 18 to 24, 31.7% from 25 to 44, 20.3% from 45 to 64, and 13.3% 65 or older. The median age was 36 years. For every 100 females, there were 95.2 males. For every 100 females age 18 and over, there were 92.1 males.

The median household income was $35,020 and the median family income was $41,643. Males had a median income of $30,885 versus $23,708 for females. The per capita income for the city was $16,049. About 6.4% of families and 8.3% of the population were below the poverty line, including 11.8% of those under age 18 and 9.2% of those age 65 or over.

== Education ==
Rittman High School, Rittman Middle School, and Rittman Elementary School are all part of the Rittman Exempted Village School District.

Rittman is served by a branch of the Wayne County Public Library.

Rittman is also the home of the Ohio Western Reserve National Cemetery
