= Knox County, Ohio =

County in Ohio, United States

- County
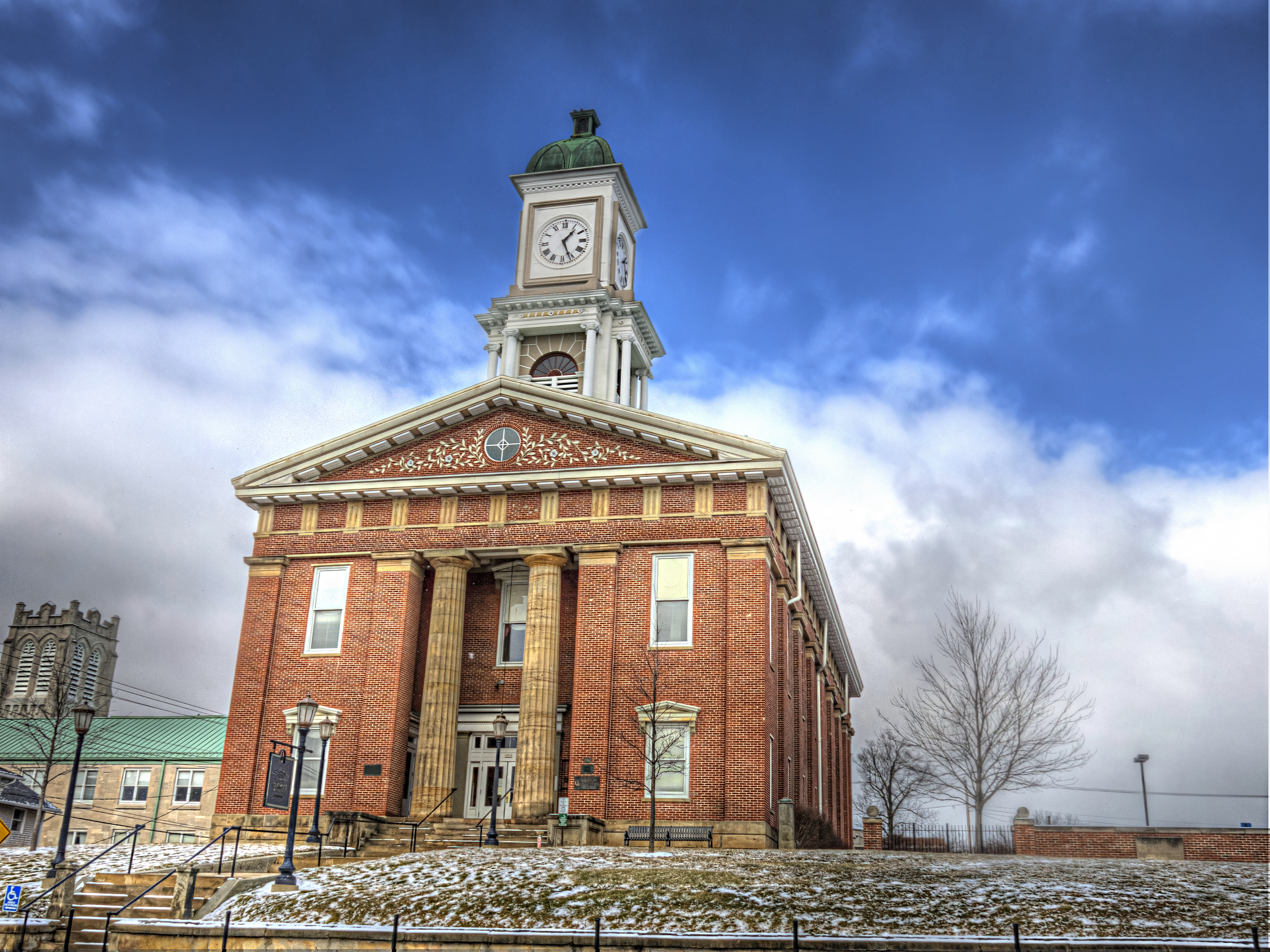
- The Knox County Courthouse in 2013

- Flag Seal

- Location within the U.S. state of Ohio
- Coordinates: 40°23′N 82°28′W
- Country: United States
- State: Ohio
- Founded: March 1, 1808
- Named for: Henry Knox
- Seat: Mount Vernon
- Largest city: Mount Vernon

Area
  - Total: 530 sq mi (1,400 km^{2})
  - Land: 525 sq mi (1,360 km^{2})
  - Water: 4.1 sq mi (11 km^{2}) 0.8%

Population (2020)
  - Total: 62,721
  - Estimate (2025): 64,002 ▲
  - Density: 122/sq mi (47/km^{2})
- Time zone: UTC−5 (Eastern)
  - Summer (DST): UTC−4 (EDT)
- Congressional district: 12th
- Website: www.co.knox.oh.us

Knox County is a county located in the U.S. state of Ohio. As of the 2020 census, the population was 62,721. Its county seat is Mount Vernon. The county is named for Henry Knox, an officer in the American Revolutionary War who was later the first Secretary of War. Knox County comprises the Mount Vernon, OH Micropolitan Statistical Area, which is also included in the Columbus-Marion-Zanesville, OH Combined Statistical Area.

== History ==
Knox County was formed from Fairfield County in 1808.

== Geography ==
According to the U.S. Census Bureau, the county has a total area of 530 square miles (1,400 km^{2}), of which 525 square miles (1,360 km^{2}) is land and 4.1 square miles (11 km^{2}) (0.8%) is water. Approximately 58% of the county is farmland and 28% is forested. Most of the county lies in the Glaciated Allegheny Plateau with rolling hills and valleys. Although the relief is not sharp, some elevations in the county reach over 1400 feet above sea level.

=== Adjacent counties ===
- Richland County (north)
- Ashland County (far northeast)
- Holmes County (northeast)
- Coshocton County (east)
- Licking County (south)
- Delaware County (southwest)
- Morrow County (northwest)

== Demographics ==
Historical population
Census	Pop.	Note	%±
1810	2,149		—
1820	8,326		287.4%
1830	17,085		105.2%
1840	29,579		73.1%
1850	28,872		−2.4%
1860	27,735		−3.9%
1870	26,333		−5.1%
1880	27,431		4.2%
1890	27,600		0.6%
1900	27,768		0.6%
1910	30,181		8.7%
1920	29,580		−2.0%
1930	29,338		−0.8%
1940	31,024		5.7%
1950	35,287		13.7%
1960	38,808		10.0%
1970	41,795		7.7%
1980	46,304		10.8%
1990	47,473		2.5%
2000	54,500		14.8%
2010	60,921		11.8%
2020	62,721		3.0%
2025 (est.)	64,002	▲	2.0%
U.S. Decennial Census; 1790–1960 1900–90; 1990–2000 2020 2025

=== 2020 census ===
As of the 2020 census, the county had a population of 62,721. The median age was 39.7 years. 23.0% of residents were under the age of 18 and 19.0% of residents were 65 years of age or older. For every 100 females there were 96.9 males, and for every 100 females age 18 and over there were 94.5 males age 18 and over.

The racial makeup of the county was 93.1% White, 0.9% Black or African American, 0.2% American Indian and Alaska Native, 0.6% Asian, <0.1% Native Hawaiian and Pacific Islander, 1.0% from some other race, and 4.2% from two or more races. Hispanic or Latino residents of any race comprised 1.9% of the population.

30.3% of residents lived in urban areas, while 69.7% lived in rural areas.

There were 23,429 households in the county, of which 29.2% had children under the age of 18 living in them. Of all households, 53.0% were married-couple households, 16.8% were households with a male householder and no spouse or partner present, and 23.1% were households with a female householder and no spouse or partner present. About 26.6% of all households were made up of individuals and 12.6% had someone living alone who was 65 years of age or older.

There were 25,797 housing units, of which 9.2% were vacant. Among occupied housing units, 73.5% were owner-occupied and 26.5% were renter-occupied. The homeowner vacancy rate was 1.3% and the rental vacancy rate was 5.9%.

=== Racial and ethnic composition ===
Knox County, Ohio – Racial and ethnic composition Note: the US Census treats Hispanic/Latino as an ethnic category. This table excludes Latinos from the racial categories and assigns them to a separate category. Hispanics/Latinos may be of any race.
Race / Ethnicity (NH = Non-Hispanic)	Pop 1980	Pop 1990	Pop 2000	Pop 2010	Pop 2020	% 1980	% 1990	% 2000	% 2010	% 2020
White alone (NH)	45,596	46,622	52,989	58,498	58,058	98.47%	98.21%	97.23%	96.02%	92.57%
Black or African American alone (NH)	291	374	361	485	565	0.63%	0.79%	0.66%	0.80%	0.90%
Native American or Alaska Native alone (NH)	40	91	102	116	118	0.09%	0.19%	0.19%	0.19%	0.19%
Asian alone (NH)	90	192	186	348	365	0.19%	0.40%	0.34%	0.57%	0.58%
Native Hawaiian or Pacific Islander alone (NH)	x	x	9	16	17	x	x	0.02%	0.03%	0.03%
Other race alone (NH)	76	23	25	52	237	0.16%	0.05%	0.05%	0.09%	0.38%
Mixed race or Multiracial (NH)	x	x	457	669	2,165	x	x	0.84%	1.10%	3.45%
Hispanic or Latino (any race)	211	171	371	737	1,196	0.46%	0.36%	0.68%	1.21%	1.91%
Total	46,304	47,473	54,500	60,921	62,721	100.00%	100.00%	100.00%	100.00%	100.00%

=== 2010 census ===
As of the 2010 United States census, there were 60,921 people, 22,607 households, and 15,693 families living in the county. The population density was 115.9 inhabitants per square mile (44.7/km^{2}). There were 25,118 housing units at an average density of 47.8 per square mile (18.5/km^{2}). The racial makeup of the county was 96.7% white, 0.8% black or African American, 0.6% Asian, 0.2% American Indian, 0.4% from other races, and 1.2% from two or more races. Those of Hispanic or Latino origin made up 1.2% of the population. In terms of ancestry, 30.5% were German, 14.4% were Irish, 13.9% were English, and 9.2% were American.

Of the 22,607 households, 32.4% had children under the age of 18 living with them, 55.2% were married couples living together, 9.7% had a female householder with no husband present, 30.6% were non-families, and 25.7% of all households were made up of individuals. The average household size was 2.54 and the average family size was 3.04. The median age was 38.3 years.

The median income for a household in the county was $45,655 and the median income for a family was $55,881. Males had a median income of $41,762 versus $30,836 for females. The per capita income for the county was $21,204. About 9.1% of families and 13.1% of the population were below the poverty line, including 18.8% of those under age 18 and 9.5% of those age 65 or over.

=== 2000 census ===
As of the census of 2010, there were 60,921 people, 22,607 households, and 15,693 families living in the county. There were 24,997 housing units. The racial makeup of the county was 96.7% White, 0.8% Black or African American, 0.2% Native American, 0.6% Asian, 0.03% Pacific Islander, 0.4% from other races, and 1.2% from two or more races. 1.2% of the population were Hispanic or Latino of any race.

There were 22,607 households, out of which 29.5% had children under the age of 18 living with them, 55.2% were married couples living together, 9.7% had a female householder with no husband present, and 30.6% were non-families. 25.7% of all households were made up of individuals, and 27.4% had someone living alone who was 65 years of age or older. The average household size was 2.54 and the average family size was 3.04.

In the county, the population was spread out, with 28.0% under the age of 20, 7.9% from 20 to 24, 22.5% from 25 to 44, 27.0% from 45 to 64, and 14.8% who were 65 years of age or older. The median age was 38.3 years. For every 100 females there were 99.4 males.

The median income for a household in the county was $48,734, and the median income for a family was $50,034. The per capita income for the county was $22,628. About 9.4% of families and 13.0% of the population were below the poverty line, including 19.2% of those under age 18 and 8.3% of those age 65 or over.

In Knox county, the 2000 census reported that the number of same-sex couples was 91 and the percent of same-sex couples out of all households was 0.46%.

== Politics ==
Knox County is a Republican stronghold county in presidential elections. The last time it supported Democrats was for Lyndon B. Johnson in 1964.

United States presidential election results for Knox County, Ohio
Year	Republican		Democratic		Third party(ies)	
Year	No.	%	No.	%	No.	%
1856	2,735	51.64%	2,437	46.02%	124	2.34%
1860	2,860	51.48%	2,060	37.08%	636	11.45%
1864	2,899	53.25%	2,545	46.75%	0	0.00%
1868	2,908	51.25%	2,766	48.75%	0	0.00%
1872	2,773	49.44%	2,730	48.67%	106	1.89%
1876	3,151	48.15%	3,301	50.44%	92	1.41%
1880	3,432	48.82%	3,475	49.43%	123	1.75%
1884	3,573	49.03%	3,530	48.44%	185	2.54%
1888	3,588	48.68%	3,528	47.86%	255	3.46%
1892	3,347	45.98%	3,489	47.93%	444	6.10%
1896	3,762	47.72%	4,062	51.52%	60	0.76%
1900	4,011	50.56%	3,797	47.86%	125	1.58%
1904	4,235	56.17%	3,036	40.27%	269	3.57%
1908	4,318	49.09%	4,233	48.12%	245	2.79%
1912	2,530	32.05%	3,632	46.01%	1,732	21.94%
1916	3,646	43.49%	4,578	54.61%	159	1.90%
1920	8,178	55.98%	6,361	43.54%	71	0.49%
1924	7,519	57.43%	4,721	36.06%	853	6.51%
1928	10,028	73.07%	3,601	26.24%	95	0.69%
1932	8,272	53.42%	7,008	45.25%	206	1.33%
1936	7,956	47.81%	8,315	49.97%	370	2.22%
1940	10,303	59.27%	7,081	40.73%	0	0.00%
1944	9,963	64.13%	5,573	35.87%	0	0.00%
1948	8,607	58.33%	6,120	41.48%	28	0.19%
1952	12,705	69.05%	5,694	30.95%	0	0.00%
1956	12,347	71.35%	4,958	28.65%	0	0.00%
1960	12,711	65.94%	6,565	34.06%	0	0.00%
1964	7,258	39.27%	11,222	60.73%	0	0.00%
1968	9,072	55.01%	5,725	34.71%	1,695	10.28%
1972	10,705	63.95%	5,370	32.08%	664	3.97%
1976	9,290	54.39%	7,361	43.09%	430	2.52%
1980	10,384	57.07%	6,586	36.20%	1,225	6.73%
1984	14,062	70.66%	5,730	28.79%	109	0.55%
1988	12,180	63.44%	6,882	35.84%	138	0.72%
1992	9,044	41.59%	7,259	33.38%	5,442	25.03%
1996	10,159	50.62%	7,562	37.68%	2,347	11.70%
2000	13,393	63.00%	7,133	33.55%	734	3.45%
2004	17,068	63.11%	9,820	36.31%	157	0.58%
2008	16,640	58.83%	11,014	38.94%	631	2.23%
2012	17,266	60.66%	10,470	36.78%	727	2.55%
2016	19,131	66.14%	8,171	28.25%	1,625	5.62%
2020	22,340	71.01%	8,589	27.30%	530	1.68%
2024	23,112	71.61%	8,698	26.95%	467	1.45%

United States Senate election results for Knox County, Ohio1
Year	Republican		Democratic		Third party(ies)	
Year	No.	%	No.	%	No.	%
2024	21,363	66.84%	9,537	29.84%	1,061	3.32%

== Government ==
People, who represent the county in various elected positions, at different levels of the government include:

=== County commissioners ===
- Theresa Bemiller, Republican
- Bill Pursel, Republican
- Thom Collier, Republican

=== State Senate ===
- Andrew Brenner, Republican, Ohio's 19th senatorial district

=== State representative ===
- Rick Carfagna, Republican, Ohio's 68th House of Representatives district

=== United States representative ===
- Troy Balderson, Republican, Ohio's 12th congressional district

=== United States senators ===
- Bernie Moreno, Republican, Ohio
- Jon Husted, Republican, Ohio

== Economy ==
A large portion of Knox County's economy is based on agriculture, with gross cash receipts for crops and livestock at $110 million for 2011. Corn is the primary crop, followed by soybeans and livestock. Mount Vernon, the county seat, is home to major employers in the county, Siemens Energy Inc. (formerly Rolls-Royce Energy Systems, Inc. and Cooper Industries before that) and Ariel Corporation, both of which are manufacturers of components used in the natural gas industry. Major employers in the county also include Kenyon College located in Gambier, Mount Vernon Nazarene University in Mount Vernon, and the Kokosing Construction Company near Fredericktown.

In 2023 and 2024, the county was in the thrall of a misinformation campaign against Frazier Solar, a proposed solar farm in the county. Fossil fuel interests financed the local newspaper (Mount Vernon News), sent text messages to residents, funded an ostensibly grassroots opposition group and funded speakers who talked about the dangers of solar energy.

== Education ==
- Kenyon College
- Mount Vernon Nazarene University

== Transportation ==
The Knox County Airport is located four nautical miles (4.6 mi; 7.4 km) southwest of Mount Vernon's central business district.

== Communities ==
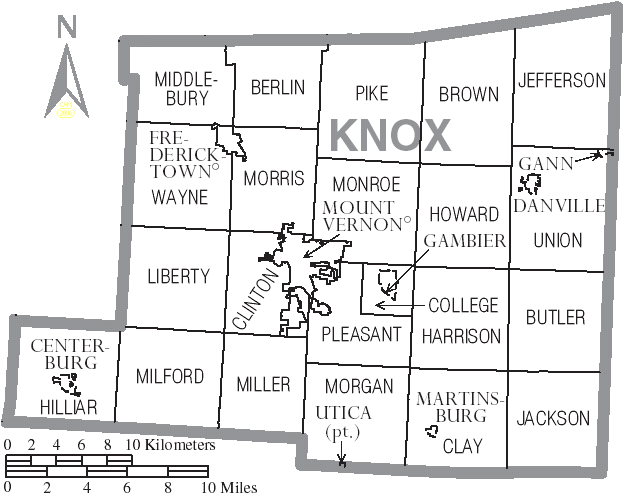
Map of Knox County, Ohio with Municipal and Township Labels

=== City ===
- Mount Vernon (county seat)

=== Villages ===
- Brinkhaven
- Centerburg
- Danville
- Fredericktown
- Gambier
- Martinsburg
- Utica

=== Townships ===
- Berlin
- Brown
- Butler
- Clay
- Clinton
- College
- Harrison
- Hilliar
- Howard
- Jackson
- Jefferson
- Liberty
- Middlebury
- Milford
- Miller
- Monroe
- Morgan
- Morris
- Pike
- Pleasant
- Union
- Wayne

=== Census-designated places ===
- Apple Valley
- Bladensburg
- Howard
- South Mount Vernon

=== Unincorporated communities ===
- Amity
- Ankenytown
- Artanna
- Bangs
- Batemantown
- Brandon
- Five Corners
- Green Valley
- Greer
- Hunt
- Jelloway
- Knox
- Lock
- Lucerne
- Millwood
- Monroe Mills
- Morgan Center
- Mt. Liberty
- North Liberty
- Palmyra
- Pipesville
- Rich Hill
- Rossville
- Waterford
- Zuck

== Notable people ==
Notable people, who lived or worked in Knox County, include the following:

- Thomas Peter Akers, United States Congressman
- Sean M. Decatur, chemist and former president of Kenyon College
- Dan Emmett, songwriter of "Dixie"
- George Hunt, Illinois Attorney General
- Paul Lynde, actor (Bewitched, Hollywood Squares)
- Paul Newman, actor
- Luke Perry, actor

== See also ==
- National Register of Historic Places listings in Knox County, Ohio
