= Lucerne, Ohio =

Lucerne, Ohio may refer to:

- Lucerne, Columbiana County, Ohio, a ghost town
- Lucerne, Knox County, Ohio, an unincorporated community
