= Rossville =

Rossville is the name of the following towns:

Australia

- Rossville, Queensland, a town and locality in the Shire of Cook

Canada

- Rossville, Manitoba

United States

- Rossville, Georgia
- Rossville, Illinois
- Rossville, Indiana
- Rossville, Iowa
- Rossville, Kansas
- Rossville, Maryland
- Rossville, Missouri
- Rossville, Staten Island, New York, a neighborhood in New York City
- Rossville, Ohio, an unincorporated community in Miami County
- Rossville, Knox County, Ohio, a ghost town
- Rossville Historic District (Hamilton, Ohio), Butler County
- Rossville, Tennessee
