= Middlebury Township, Knox County, Ohio =

Township in Ohio, US

- Township
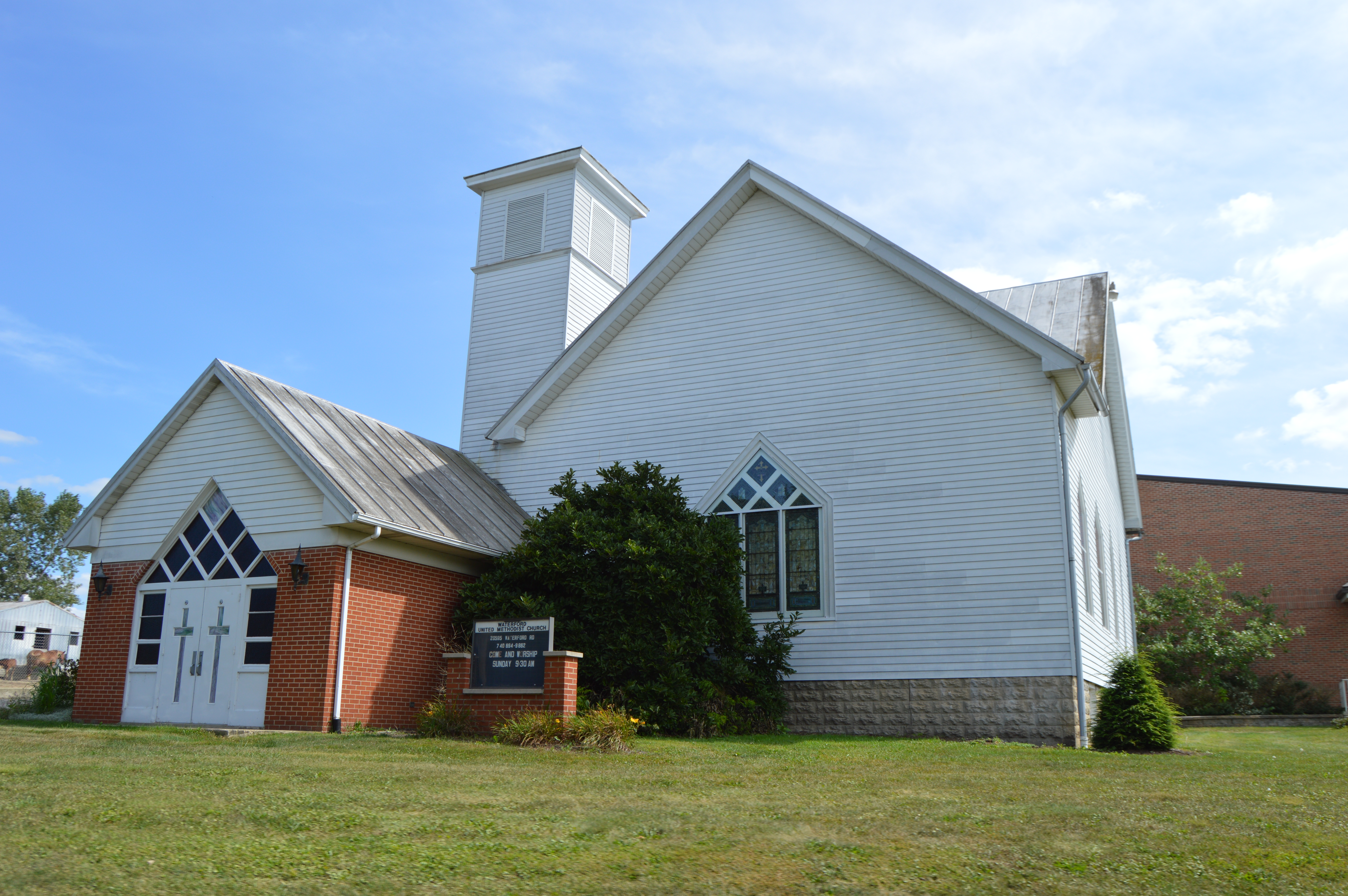
- Methodist church at Waterford

- Location of Middlebury Township in Knox County.
- Coordinates: 40°30′55″N 82°35′12″W
- Country: United States
- State: Ohio
- County: Knox

Area
  - Total: 20.9 sq mi (54.2 km^{2})
  - Land: 20.5 sq mi (53.2 km^{2})
  - Water: 0.39 sq mi (1.0 km^{2})
- Elevation: 1,129 ft (344 m)

Population (2020)
  - Total: 1,406
  - Density: 68.4/sq mi (26.4/km^{2})
- Time zone: UTC-5 (Eastern (EST))
  - Summer (DST): UTC-4 (EDT)
- FIPS code: 39-49658
- GNIS feature ID: 1086404

Historical population
Census	Pop.	Note	%±
1990	849		—
2000	1,138		34.0%
2010	1,278		12.3%
2020	1,406		10.0%
2024 (est.)	1,437		2.2%
U.S. Census:

Middlebury Township is one of the twenty-two townships of Knox County, Ohio, United States. The 2020 census found 1,406 people in the township.

== Geography ==
Located in the northwestern corner of the county, it borders the following townships:

- Perry Township, Richland County - north
- Jefferson Township, Richland County - northeast
- Berlin Township - east
- Morris Township - southeast corner
- Wayne Township - south
- Chester Township, Morrow County - southwest corner
- Franklin Township, Morrow County - west
- Perry Township, Morrow County - northwest

A small part of the village of Fredericktown is located in southeastern Middlebury Township.

== Name and history ==
Middlebury Township was established in 1823. It was originally settled chiefly by Quakers from Frederick County, Maryland.

It is the only Middlebury Township statewide.

== Government ==
The township is governed by a three-member board of trustees, who are elected in November of odd-numbered years to a four-year term beginning on the following January 1. Two are elected in the year after the presidential election and one is elected in the year before it. There is also an elected township fiscal officer, who serves a four-year term beginning on April 1 of the year after the election, which is held in November of the year before the presidential election. Vacancies in the fiscal officership or on the board of trustees are filled by the remaining trustees.
