= Miller Township, Knox County, Ohio =

Township in Ohio, US

Miller Township, Knox County Ohio
- Township
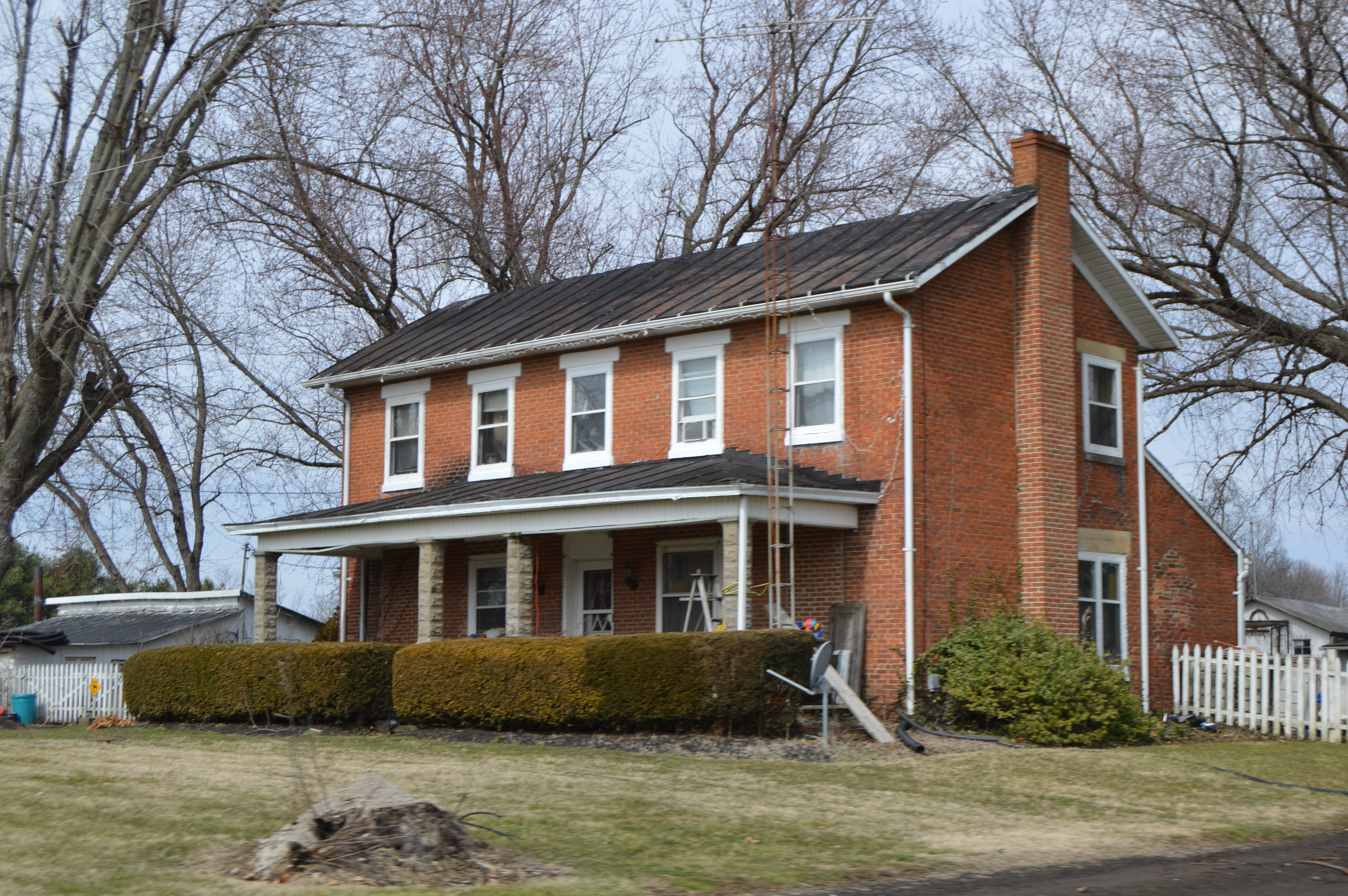
- Farmhouse west of Brandon

- Location of Miller Township in Knox County.
- Coordinates: 40°17′58″N 82°30′26″W
- Country: United States
- State: Ohio
- County: Knox

Area
  - Total: 20.7 sq mi (53.7 km^{2})
  - Land: 20.7 sq mi (53.7 km^{2})
  - Water: 0 sq mi (0.0 km^{2})
- Elevation: 1,099 ft (335 m)

Population (2020)
  - Total: 1,095
  - Density: 52.8/sq mi (20.4/km^{2})
- Time zone: UTC-5 (Eastern (EST))
  - Summer (DST): UTC-4 (EDT)
- FIPS code: 39-50330
- GNIS feature ID: 1086406

Miller Township is one of the twenty-two townships of Knox County, Ohio, United States. The 2020 census found 1,095 people in the township.

== Geography ==
Located in the southern part of the county, it borders the following townships:

- Clinton Township - north
- Pleasant Township - northeast
- Morgan Township - east
- Burlington Township, Licking County - south
- Bennington Township, Licking County - southwest corner
- Milford Township - west
- Liberty Township - northwest corner

No municipalities are located in Miller Township.

== Name and history ==
Miller Township was named for James Miller, a pioneer settler who gave elections officials five and one half gallons of whiskey to secure the honor. It is the only Miller Township statewide.

Miller Township was originally built up chiefly by settlers from Vermont and Rhode Island.

== Government ==
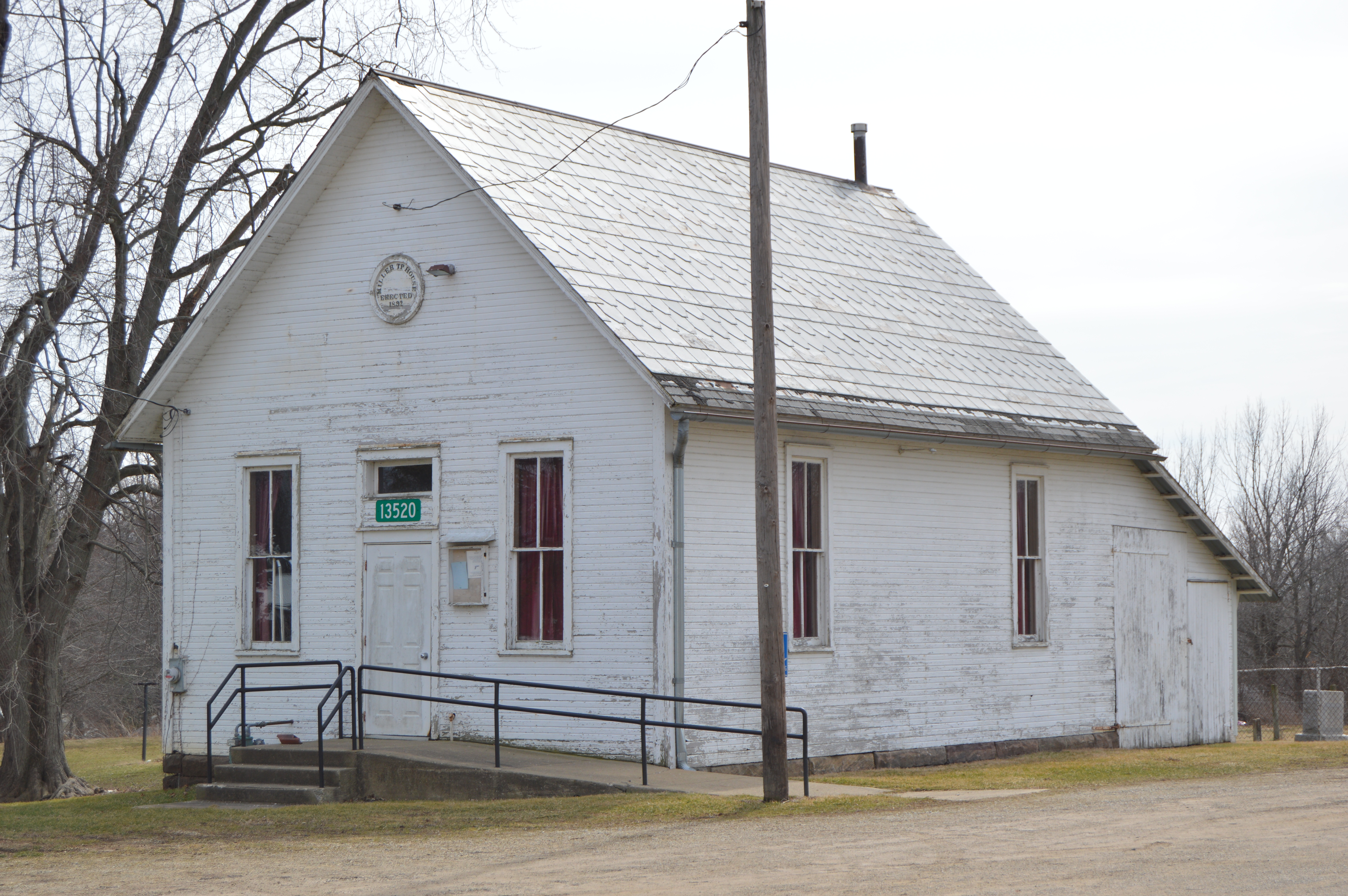
Township hall at Brandon

The township is governed by a three-member board of trustees, who are elected in November of odd-numbered years to a four-year term beginning on the following January 1. Two are elected in the year after the presidential election and one is elected in the year before it. There is also an elected township fiscal officer, who serves a four-year term beginning on April 1 of the year after the election, which is held in November of the year before the presidential election. Vacancies in the fiscal officership or on the board of trustees are filled by the remaining trustees.
