= Bennington Township, Ohio =

Bennington Township, Ohio, may refer to:

- Bennington Township, Licking County, Ohio
- Bennington Township, Morrow County, Ohio
