= North Liberty =

North Liberty is the name of the following places in the United States of America:

- North Liberty, Indiana
- North Liberty, Iowa
- Keene, Kentucky, originally established as North Liberty
- North Liberty, Ohio

== See also ==
- North Liberties, barony of County Limerick in Ireland
- Northern Liberties
