= Pleasant Township, Knox County, Ohio =

Township in Ohio, US

Pleasant Township, Knox County Ohio
- Township
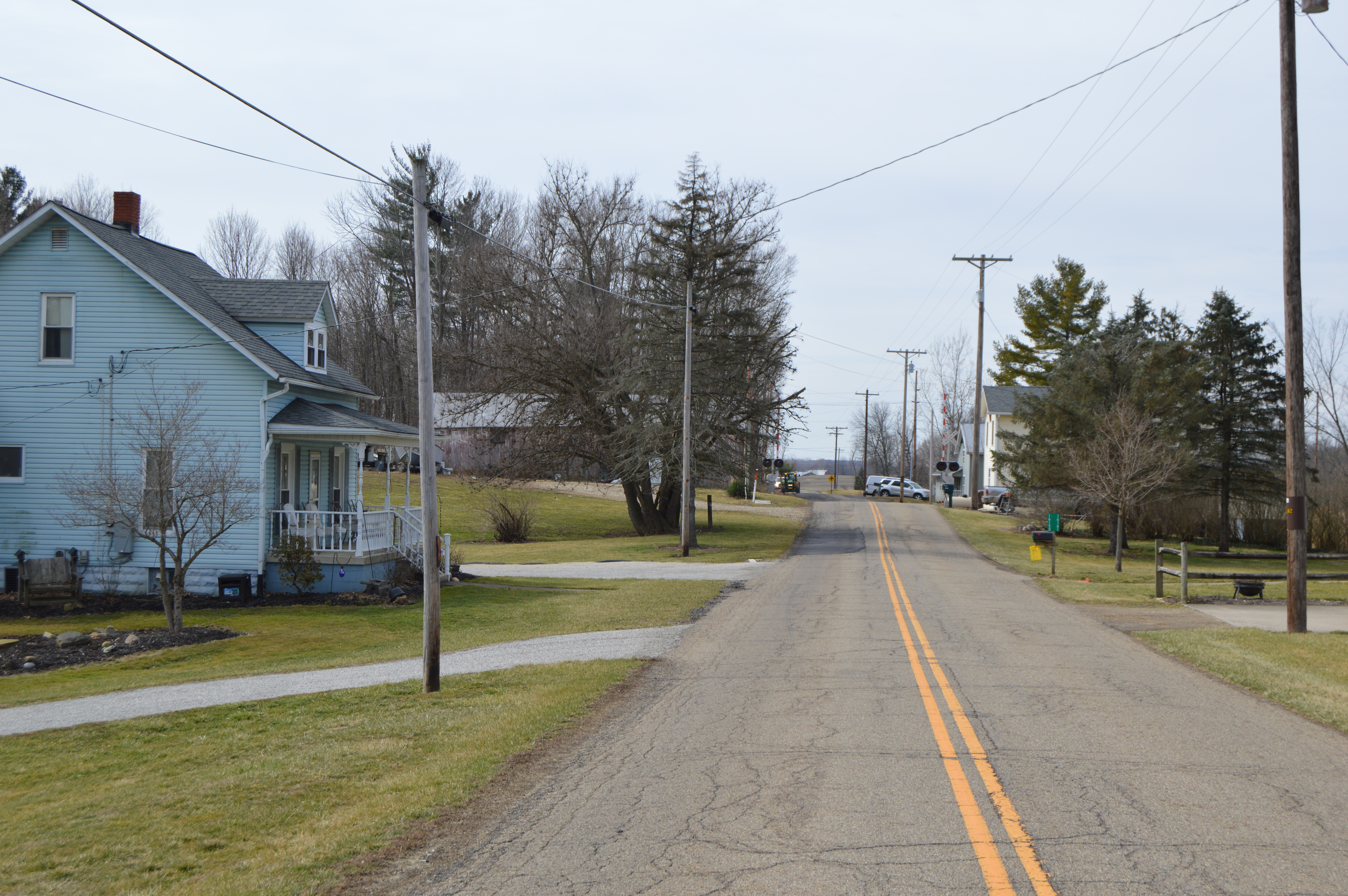
- Sycamore Road at the community of Hunt

- Location of Pleasant Township in Knox County.
- Coordinates: 40°21′11″N 82°26′9″W
- Country: United States
- State: Ohio
- County: Knox

Area
  - Total: 18.1 sq mi (47.0 km^{2})
  - Land: 18.1 sq mi (47.0 km^{2})
  - Water: 0 sq mi (0.0 km^{2})
- Elevation: 1,178 ft (359 m)

Population (2020)
  - Total: 1,657
  - Density: 91.3/sq mi (35.3/km^{2})
- Time zone: UTC-5 (Eastern (EST))
  - Summer (DST): UTC-4 (EDT)
- FIPS code: 39-63310
- GNIS feature ID: 1086412

Pleasant Township is one of the twenty-two townships of Knox County, Ohio, United States. The 2020 census found 1,657 people in the township.

== Geography ==
Located in the center of the county, it borders the following townships:

- Monroe Township - north
- College Township - northeast
- Harrison Township - east
- Clay Township - southeast corner
- Morgan Township - south
- Miller Township - southwest
- Clinton Township - west

Part of the city of Mount Vernon, the county seat of Knox County, occupies parts of northwestern Pleasant Township.

== Name and history ==
Pleasant Township was established on March 9, 1825, and was named for its scenic landscapes. On December 7, 1838 the county commissioners split off the northeast quarter of the township to create College Township in honor of Kenyon College. There are no incorporated villages in the township, but the unincorporated community of Hunt once had a store and post office near the only railroad station in the township along what was then the Sandusky, Mansfield and Newark Railroad (later, the Baltimore and Ohio Railroad).

It is one of fifteen Pleasant Townships statewide.

== Government ==
The township is governed by a three-member board of trustees, who are elected in November of odd-numbered years to a four-year term beginning on the following January 1. Two are elected in the year after the presidential election and one is elected in the year before it. There is also an elected township fiscal officer, who serves a four-year term beginning on April 1 of the year after the election, which is held in November of the year before the presidential election. Vacancies in the fiscal officership or on the board of trustees are filled by the remaining trustees.
