= Morris Township, Knox County, Ohio =

Township in Ohio, US

- Township
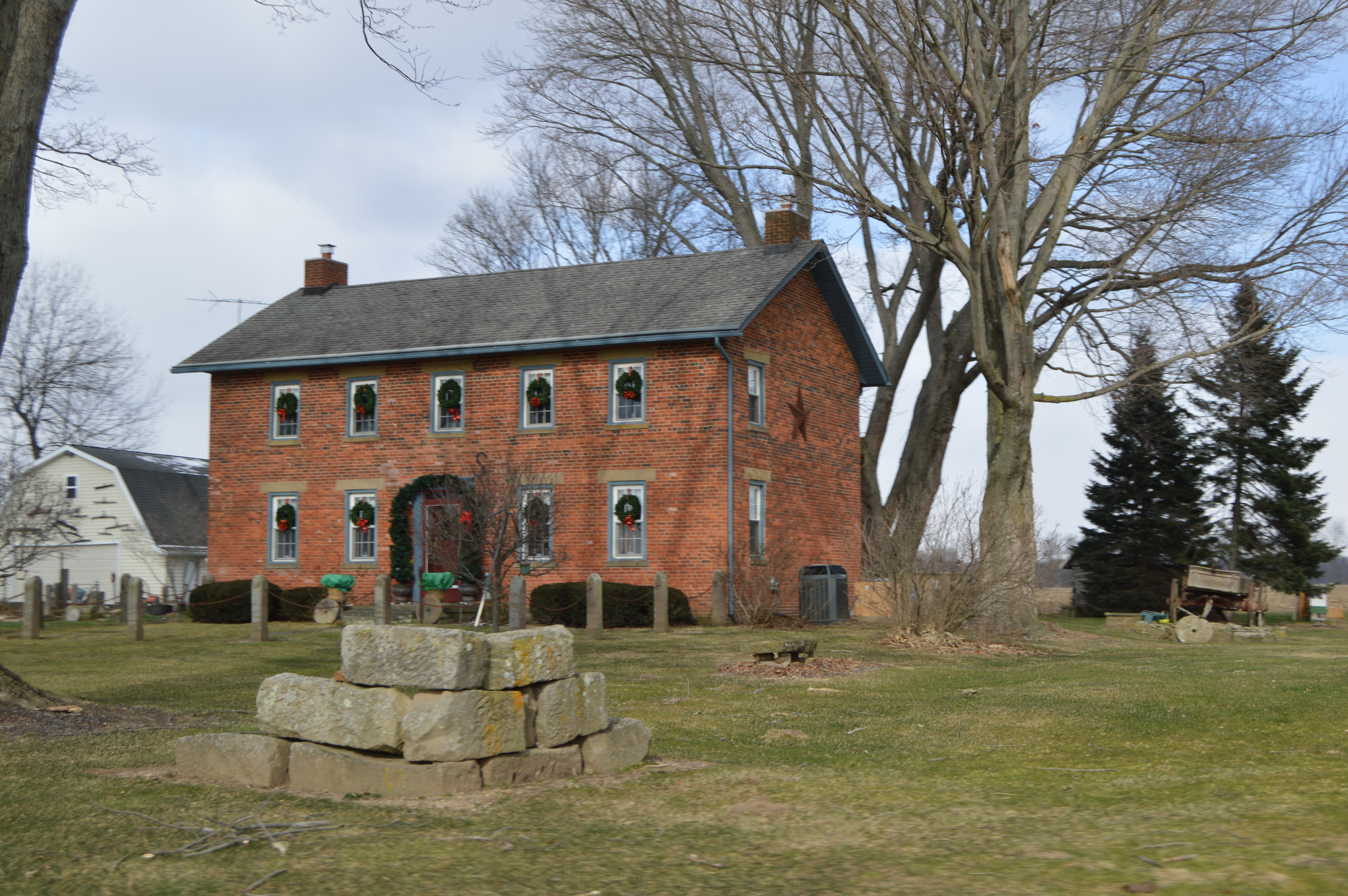
- The Richard and Ann Loveridge House, built 1832

- Location of Morris Township in Knox County.
- Coordinates: 40°26′44″N 82°30′5″W
- Country: United States
- State: Ohio
- County: Knox

Area
  - Total: 21.0 sq mi (54.4 km^{2})
  - Land: 21.0 sq mi (54.4 km^{2})
  - Water: 0 sq mi (0.0 km^{2})
- Elevation: 1,093 ft (333 m)

Population (2020)
  - Total: 2,098
  - Density: 99.9/sq mi (38.6/km^{2})
- Time zone: UTC-5 (Eastern (EST))
  - Summer (DST): UTC-4 (EDT)
- FIPS code: 39-52290
- GNIS feature ID: 1086409
- Website: https://www.morristownshipohio.org/

Morris Township is one of the twenty-two townships of Knox County, Ohio, United States. The 2020 census found 2,098 people in the township.

== Geography ==
Located in the west central part of the county, it borders the following townships:

- Berlin Township - north
- Pike Township - northeast
- Monroe Township - east
- Clinton Township - south
- Liberty Township - southwest corner
- Wayne Township - west
- Middlebury Township - northwest corner

Small parts of two municipalities are located in Morris Township: the city of Mount Vernon, the county seat of Knox County, in the southeast; and the village of Fredericktown, in the northwest. The unincorporated community of Knox is located in Morris Township.

== Name and history ==
Morris Township was established in 1812. It was named after Morris County, New Jersey, the native home of many of the township's pioneer settlers.

It is the only Morris Township statewide.

== Government ==
The township is governed by a three-member board of trustees, who are elected in November of odd-numbered years to a four-year term beginning on the following January 1. Two are elected in the year after the presidential election and one is elected in the year before it. There is also an elected township fiscal officer, who serves a four-year term beginning on April 1 of the year after the election, which is held in November of the year before the presidential election. Vacancies in the fiscal officership or on the board of trustees are filled by the remaining trustees.
