= Zuck, Ohio =

Extinct town in Ohio, U.S.

Coordinates: 40°22′41″N 82°14′11″W

Zuck is an extinct town in Knox County, in the U.S. state of Ohio. The GNIS classifies it as a populated place.

== History ==
A post office called Zuck was established in 1880, and remained in operation until 1903. The community was named for Stephen Zuck, the owner of a mill.
