= South Mount Vernon, Ohio =

- Census-designated place
- Location within Ohio Location within the United States
- Coordinates: 40°22′52″N 82°29′57″W
- Country: United States
- State: Ohio
- County: Knox
- Township: Clinton

Area
  - Total: 0.51 sq mi (1.31 km^{2})
  - Land: 0.51 sq mi (1.31 km^{2})
  - Water: 0 sq mi (0.00 km^{2})
- Elevation: 1,017 ft (310 m)

Population (2020)
  - Total: 714
  - Density: 1,413.0/sq mi (545.57/km^{2})
- Time zone: UTC-5 (Eastern (EST))
  - Summer (DST): UTC-4 (EDT)
- ZIP Code: 43050 (Mount Vernon)
- Area codes: 740/220
- FIPS code: 39-73530
- GNIS feature ID: 2806994

South Mount Vernon is a census-designated place (CDP) in Knox County, Ohio, United States, adjacent to the city of Mount Vernon. As of the 2020 census, South Mount Vernon had a population of 714. It was first listed as a CDP prior to the 2020 census.

The CDP is west of the center of Knox County, in Clinton Township. It is bordered to the north, east, and south by the city of Mount Vernon. It is bordered to the southeast by Dry Creek, a northeast-flowing tributary of the Kokosing River, part of the Walhonding River and subsequently Muskingum River watersheds leading to the Ohio River.

U.S. Route 36 (Harcourt Road) runs through the west side of the community, leading north and east into Mount Vernon, and southwest 22 miles (35 km) to Sunbury.

== Demographics ==
Historical population
Census	Pop.	Note	%±
2020	714		—
U.S. Decennial Census
