= Morgan Center, Ohio =

Unincorporated community in Ohio, U.S.

Coordinates: 40°16′49″N 82°25′4″W

Morgan Center is an unincorporated community in Morgan Township, Knox County, Ohio.

== History ==
The name was historically also rendered as Morgan Centre. A post office called Morgan Centre was established in 1890, the name was changed to Morgan Center in 1893, and the post office closed in 1901.
