= Monroe Mills, Ohio =

Unincorporated community in Ohio, U.S.

Coordinates: 40°24′29″N 82°22′09″W

Monroe Mills is an unincorporated community in Knox County, in the U.S. state of Ohio.

== History ==
Monroe Mills was named for a gristmill built in 1844 on the site in Monroe Township. A post office called Monroe Mills was established in 1849, and remained in operation until 1902.
