= Batemantown, Ohio =

Batemantown
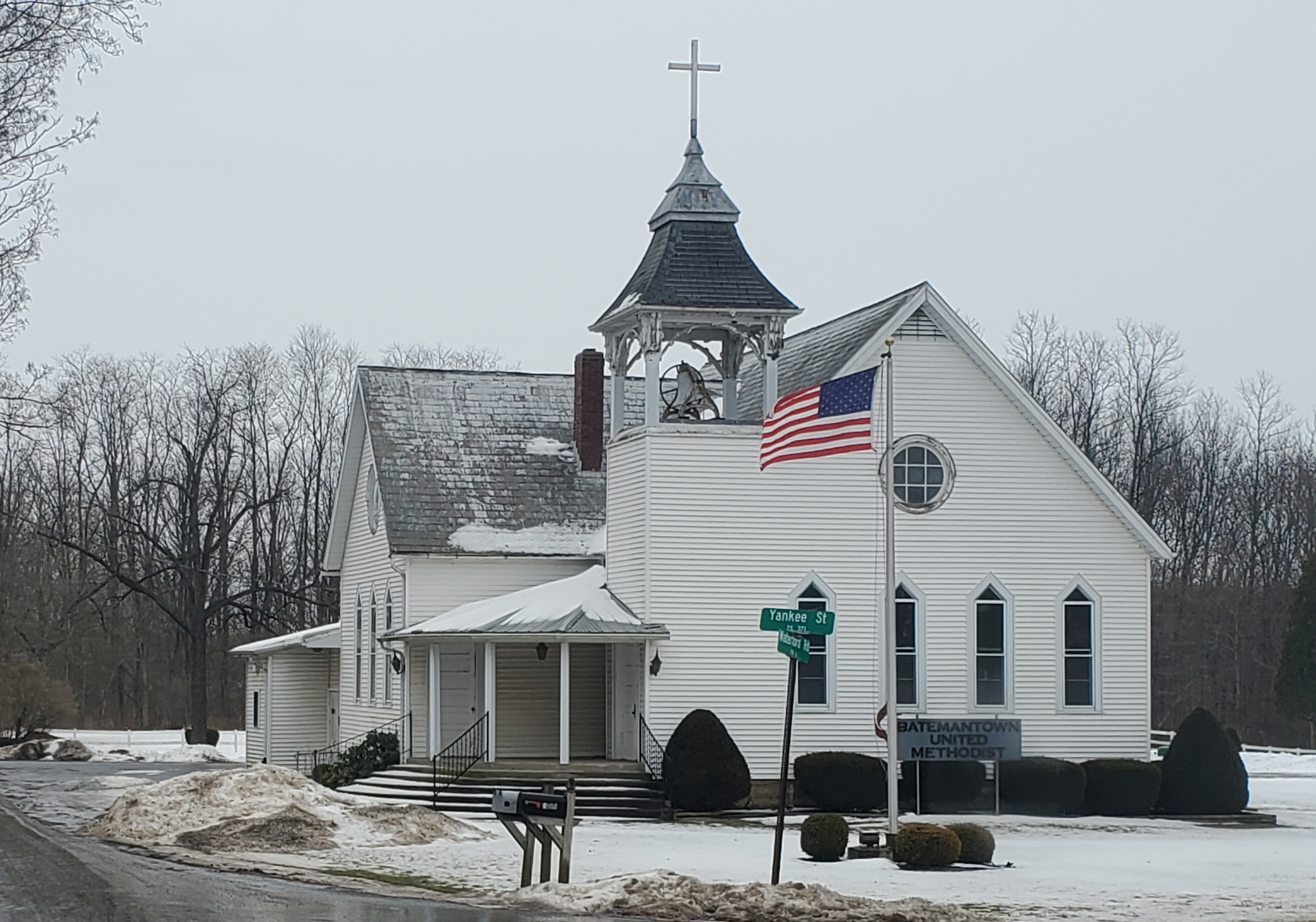
- Batemantown United Methodist Church
- Interactive map of Batemantown
- Coordinates: 40°31′33″N 82°35′46″W
- Sovereign state: United States
- State: Ohio
- County: Knox County
- Established: 1897
- Founder: Bateman family

Batemantown is an unincorporated community in Knox County, in the U.S. state of Ohio.

== History ==
A post office called Batemantown was established in 1897, and remained in operation until 1903. The community was named for the local Bateman family who came from Vermont around 1815.
