= Knox County Airport =

Public use airport in Mount Vernon, Ohio

- IATA: none; ICAO: none; FAA LID: 4I3

Summary
- Airport type: Public
- Owner: Knox County Airport Authority
- Serves: Mount Vernon, Ohio
- Time zone: UTC−05:00 (-5)
  - Summer (DST): UTC−04:00 (-4)
- Elevation AMSL: 1,192 ft (363 m)
- Coordinates: 40°19′44″N 082°31′34″W

Map
- Location within Ohio Location within the United States

Runways
Direction	Length		Surface
Direction	ft	m	Surface
10/28	5,504	1,678	Asphalt

Statistics (2023)
- Aircraft operations (year ending 8/2/2023): 24,150
- Based aircraft: 75
- Source: Federal Aviation Administration

Knox County Airport (FAA LID: 4I3) is five miles southwest of Mount Vernon, in Knox County, Ohio.

== History ==
After evaluating 16 different locations, a 109-acre (44 ha) site for the Mt. Vernon Airpark was selected in early 1964. By the time the airport was nearly finished, it was discovered that the state was offering grants for the construction or improvement of county airports. Therefore, when the airport opened on 1 March 1966 with a 3,200 ft (980 m) runway, there was already a proposal in place to extend the runway to 4,000 ft (1,200 m). By late April 1971, construction of a 2,100 ft (640 m) taxiway was planned.

The airport was temporarily closed on 15 March 1990 after the operators failed to pay rent. It was reopened two days later with volunteer help.

An airport safety zone proposed in 2001 was met with opposition from local residents.

The terminal was renovated in 2020. In 2023, the airport announced plans to add hangar space and a new building to house snow removal equipment. The airport broke ground on an Aviation Center, which includes a 10,000-square-foot (930 m^{2}) hangar, in late October 2024. A Civil Air Patrol unit was started at the airport in August 2025.

== Facilities ==
Knox County Airport covers 386 acres (156 ha) at an elevation of 1,192 feet (363 m). Its one runway, 10/28, is 5,504 x 100 ft (1,678 x 30 m) asphalt.

The airport has a fixed-base operator that sells fuel.

In the year ending August 2, 2023, the airport had 24,150 aircraft operations, average 66 per day: 97% general aviation, 2% air taxi and <1% military. 75 aircraft were then based at the airport: 71 single-engine and 3 multi-engine airplanes and 1 jet.

== Accidents and incidents ==
- On 1 December 1974, a Cessna 441 crashed at the airport, injuring the pilot and three passengers.
- On March 27, 2002, a Robinson R-22 helicopter was substantially damaged while landing at the Knox County Airport. The pilot was attempting to land at the airport after a solo flight. When the aircraft touched down, it bounced, and the pilot lost directional control. The helicopter touched down a second time, began to spin to the left, and the tailboom struck a ground observer in the head. The helicopter then rolled left and came to rest on its side. The pilot recalled that he had applied full power upon the first touchdown on the pavement, "and fell victim to torque and or tail rotor thrust." The probable cause of the accident was found to be the pilot's failure to maintain directional control while landing.
- On July 28, 2018, a Cessna 172 crashed during landing at the Knox County Airport. The pilot reported that there was smoke in the cockpit while he was trying to land, and the aircraft ignited during landing.

== See also ==
- List of airports in Ohio
