= Wayne Township, Knox County, Ohio =

Township in Ohio, US

Wayne Township, Knox County Ohio
- Township
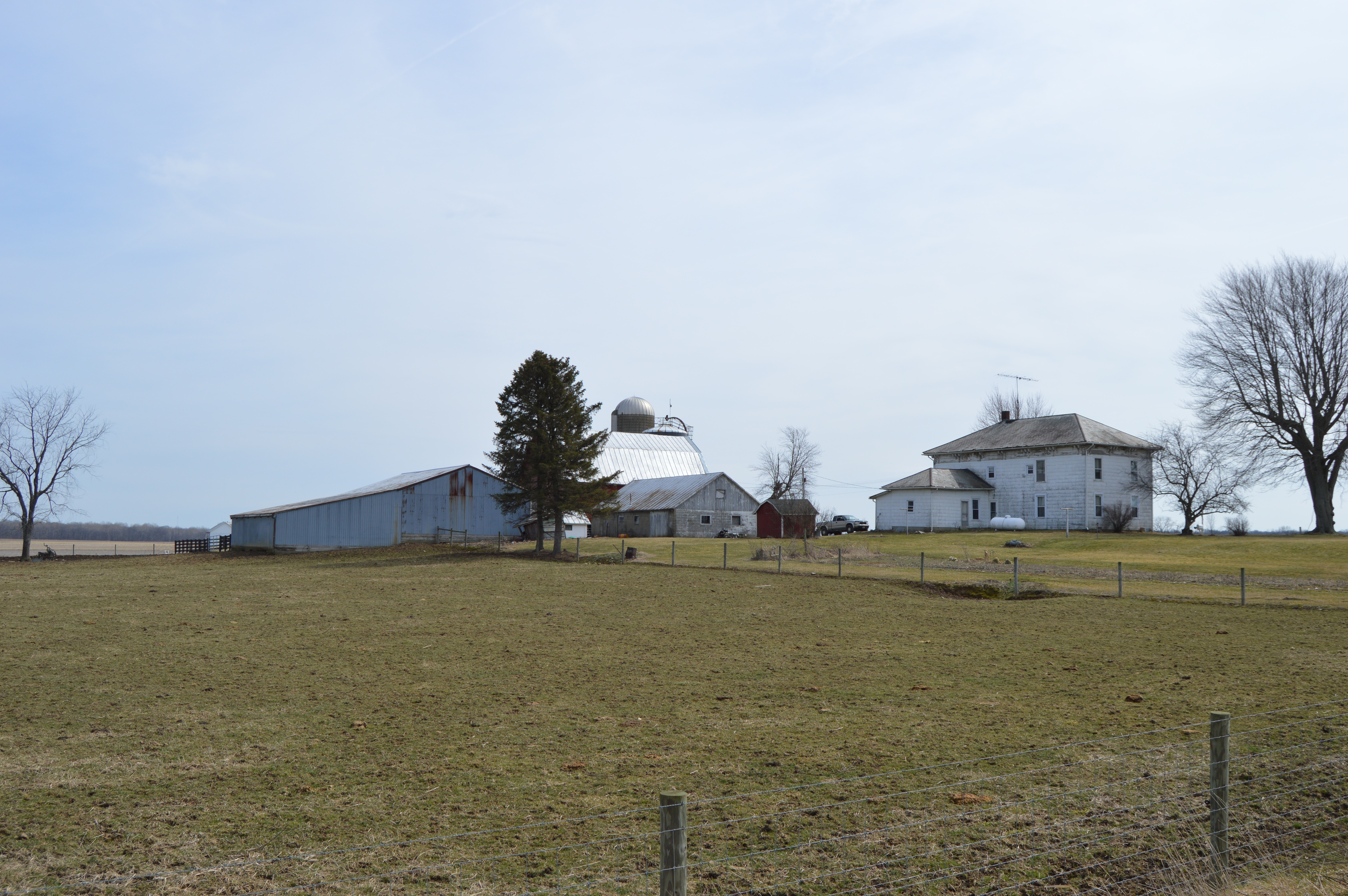
- Farmstead south of Fredericktown

- Location of Wayne Township in Knox County.
- Coordinates: 40°27′1″N 82°35′10″W
- Country: United States
- State: Ohio
- County: Knox

Area
  - Total: 25.2 sq mi (65.3 km^{2})
  - Land: 25.2 sq mi (65.3 km^{2})
  - Water: 0 sq mi (0.0 km^{2})
- Elevation: 1,086 ft (331 m)

Population (2020)
  - Total: 993
  - Density: 39.4/sq mi (15.2/km^{2})
- Time zone: UTC-5 (Eastern (EST))
  - Summer (DST): UTC-4 (EDT)
- FIPS code: 39-82194
- GNIS feature ID: 1086414

Historical population
Census	Pop.	Note	%±
1990	868		—
2000	898		3.5%
2010	892		−0.7%
2020	993		11.3%
U.S. Census:

Wayne Township is one of the twenty-two townships of Knox County, Ohio, United States. The 2020 census found 993 people in the township.

== Geography ==
Located in the western part of the county, it borders the following townships:

- Middlebury Township - north
- Berlin Township - northeast corner
- Morris Township - east
- Clinton Township - southeast corner
- Liberty Township - south
- South Bloomfield Township, Morrow County - southwest corner
- Chester Township, Morrow County - west
- Franklin Township, Morrow County - northwest corner

Most of the village of Fredericktown occupies the northeastern corner of Wayne Township.

== Name and history ==
Wayne Township was established in 1808. It is named for Anthony Wayne.

It is one of twenty Wayne Townships statewide.

== Government ==
The township is governed by a three-member board of trustees, who are elected in November of odd-numbered years to a four-year term beginning on the following January 1. Two are elected in the year after the presidential election and one is elected in the year before it. There is also an elected township fiscal officer, who serves a four-year term beginning on April 1 of the year after the election, which is held in November of the year before the presidential election. Vacancies in the fiscal officership or on the board of trustees are filled by the remaining trustees.
