= Liberty Township, Knox County, Ohio =

Township in Ohio, US

- Township
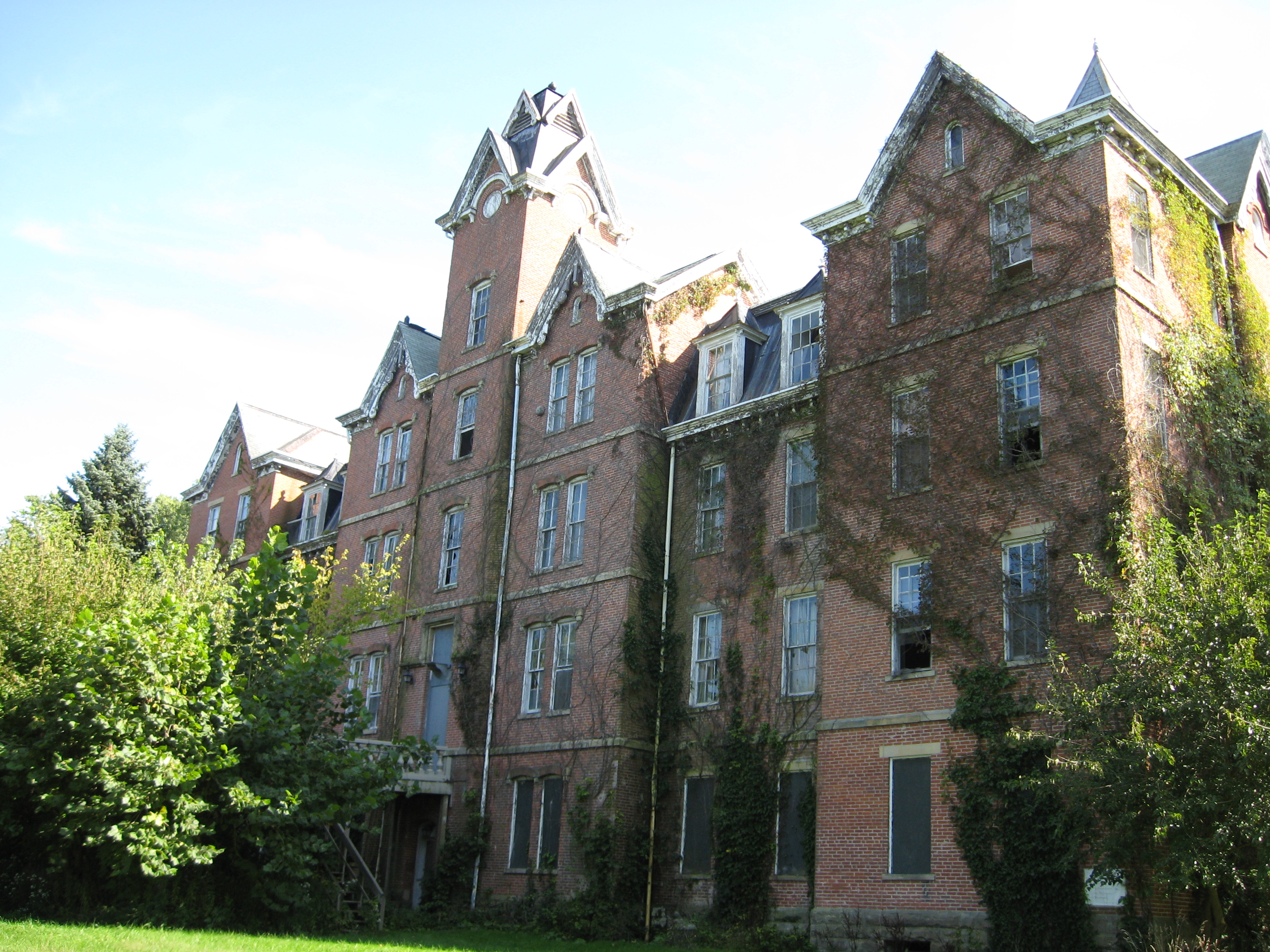
- Former county infirmary on Johnstown Road, now demolished

- Location of Liberty Township in Knox County.
- Coordinates: 40°22′24″N 82°36′8″W
- Country: United States
- State: Ohio
- County: Knox

Area
  - Total: 25.8 sq mi (66.9 km^{2})
  - Land: 25.8 sq mi (66.8 km^{2})
  - Water: 0 sq mi (0.0 km^{2})
- Elevation: 1,381 ft (421 m)

Population (2020)
  - Total: 1,906
  - Density: 73.9/sq mi (28.5/km^{2})
- Time zone: UTC-5 (Eastern (EST))
  - Summer (DST): UTC-4 (EDT)
- FIPS code: 39-43218
- GNIS feature ID: 1086403
- Website: https://www.libertyknoxoh.org/

Liberty Township is one of the twenty-two townships of Knox County, Ohio, United States. The 2020 census found 1,906 people in the township.

== Geography ==
Located in the western part of the county, it borders the following townships:

- Wayne Township - north
- Morris Township - northeast corner
- Clinton Township - east
- Miller Township - southeast corner
- Milford Township - south
- Hilliar Township - southwest corner
- South Bloomfield Township, Morrow County - west
- Chester Township, Morrow County - northwest corner

No municipalities are located in Liberty Township, although the unincorporated community of Mt. Liberty lies on the southwestern border with Milford Township.

== Name and history ==
Liberty Township was established in the 1820s. The township was named for the American ideal of liberty. It is one of twenty-five Liberty Townships statewide.

== Government ==
The township is governed by a three-member board of trustees, who are elected in November of odd-numbered years to a four-year term beginning on the following January 1. Two are elected in the year after the presidential election and one is elected in the year before it. There is also an elected township fiscal officer, who serves a four-year term beginning on April 1 of the year after the election, which is held in November of the year before the presidential election. Vacancies in the fiscal officership or on the board of trustees are filled by the remaining trustees.
