= Lock, Ohio =

Unincorporated community in Ohio, U.S.

Coordinates: 40°16′16″N 82°36′40″W

Lock is an unincorporated community in Knox and Licking counties in the U.S. state of Ohio.

== History ==
Lock was laid out in 1837. A post office called Lock was established in 1838, and remained in operation until 1902.
