= Five Corners, Ohio =

Unincorporated community in Ohio, U.S.

Coordinates: 40°19′1″N 82°35′29″W

Five Corners is an unincorporated community in Knox County, in the U.S. state of Ohio.

== History ==
A former variant name of Five Corners was Milfordton. A post office called Milfordton was established in 1848, and remained in operation until 1902. Besides the post office, Five Corners had a schoolhouse and two churches.
