= Morgan Township, Ohio =

Morgan Township, Ohio may refer to several places:

- Morgan Township, Ashtabula County, Ohio
- Morgan Township, Butler County, Ohio
- Morgan Township, Gallia County, Ohio
- Morgan Township, Knox County, Ohio
- Morgan Township, Morgan County, Ohio
- Morgan Township, Scioto County, Ohio
