= Palmyra, Knox County, Ohio =

Unincorporated community in Ohio, U.S.

Coordinates: 40°32′40″N 82°32′26″W

Palmyra is an unincorporated community in Knox County, in the U.S. state of Ohio.

== History ==
Palmyra was laid out in 1835. With the construction of the railroad, business activity shifted away from inland Palmyra, and its population dwindled.
