= Milford Township, Knox County, Ohio =

Township in Ohio, US

Milford Township, Knox County Ohio
- Township
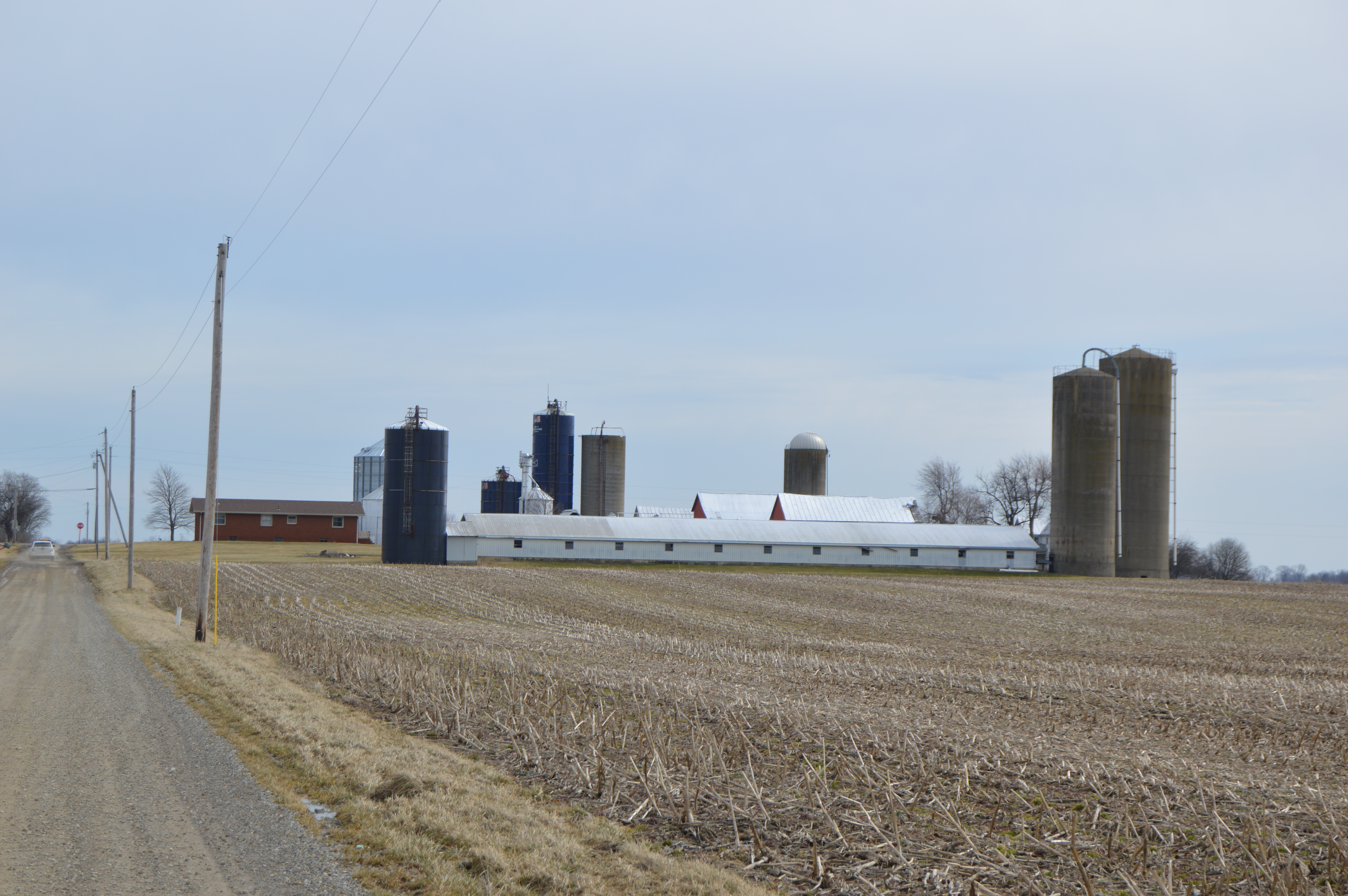
- Agricultural scene south of Mount Liberty

- Location of Milford Township in Knox County.
- Coordinates: 40°18′31″N 82°36′57″W
- Country: United States
- State: Ohio
- County: Knox

Area
  - Total: 25.7 sq mi (66.6 km^{2})
  - Land: 25.7 sq mi (66.5 km^{2})
  - Water: 0.039 sq mi (0.1 km^{2})
- Elevation: 1,211 ft (369 m)

Population (2020)
  - Total: 1,866
  - Density: 72.7/sq mi (28.1/km^{2})
- Time zone: UTC-5 (Eastern (EST))
  - Summer (DST): UTC-4 (EDT)
- FIPS code: 39-50204
- GNIS feature ID: 1086405

Milford Township is one of the twenty-two townships of Knox County, Ohio, United States. The 2020 census found 1,866 people in the township.

== Geography ==
Located in the southwestern part of the county, it borders the following townships:

- Liberty Township - north
- Clinton Township - northeast corner
- Miller Township - east
- Burlington Township, Licking County - southeast corner
- Bennington Township, Licking County - south
- Hartford Township, Licking County - southwest corner
- Hilliar Township - west
- South Bloomfield Township, Morrow County - northwest corner

No municipalities are located in Milford Township, although the unincorporated community of Mt. Liberty lies on the northwestern border with Liberty Township.

== Name and history ==
Milford Township was named after New Milford, Connecticut, by a settler who hailed from there.

Statewide, other Milford Townships are located in Butler and Defiance counties.

== Government ==
The township is governed by a three-member board of trustees, who are elected in November of odd-numbered years to a four-year term beginning on the following January 1. Two are elected in the year after the presidential election and one is elected in the year before it. There is also an elected township fiscal officer, who serves a four-year term beginning on April 1 of the year after the election, which is held in November of the year before the presidential election. Vacancies in the fiscal officership or on the board of trustees are filled by the remaining trustees.
