= Millwood, Ohio =

Unincorporated community in Knox County, Ohio

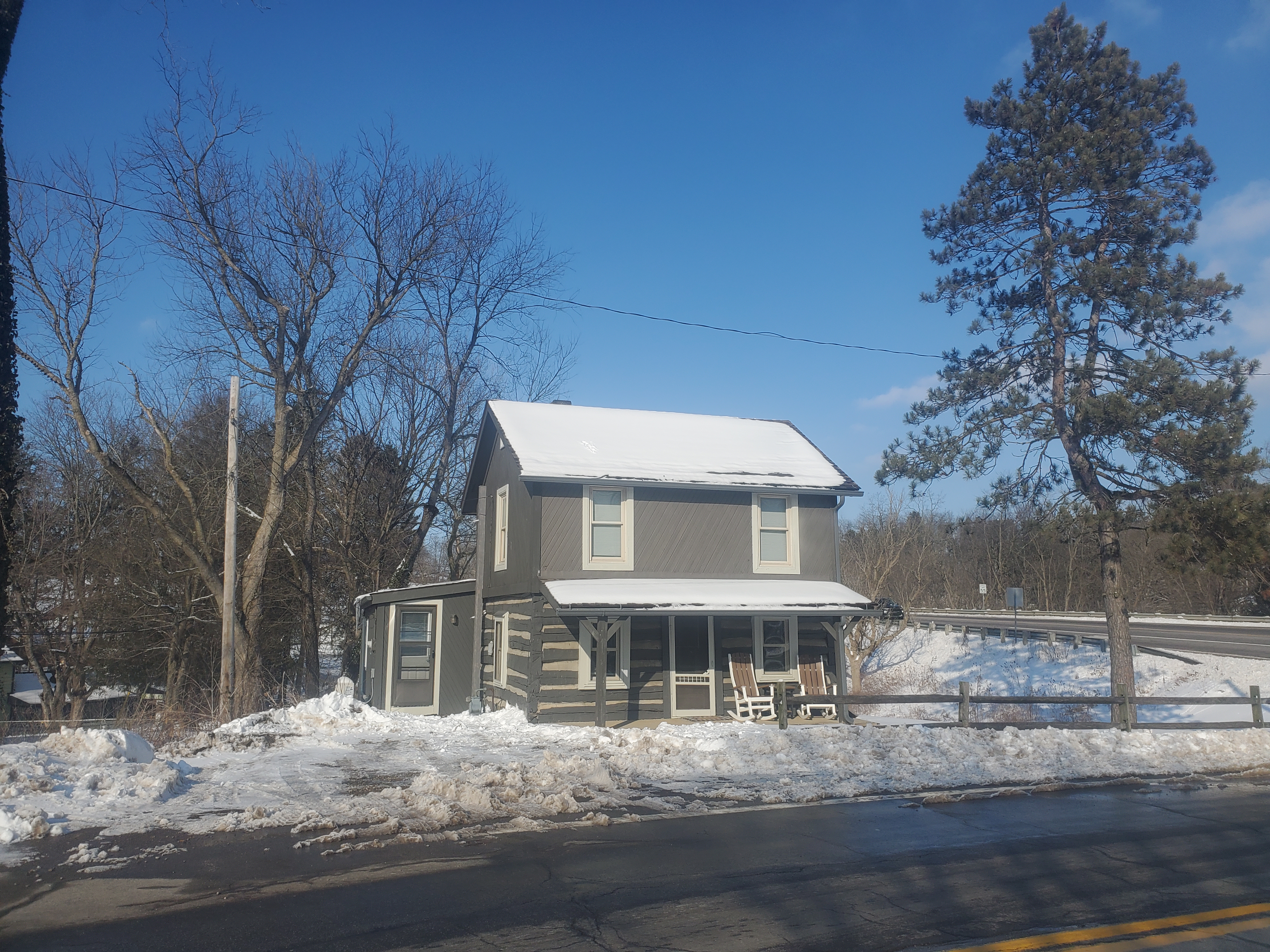
- Building in Millwood.
- Interactive map of Millwood, Ohio
- Coordinates: 40°23′58″N 82°16′40″W

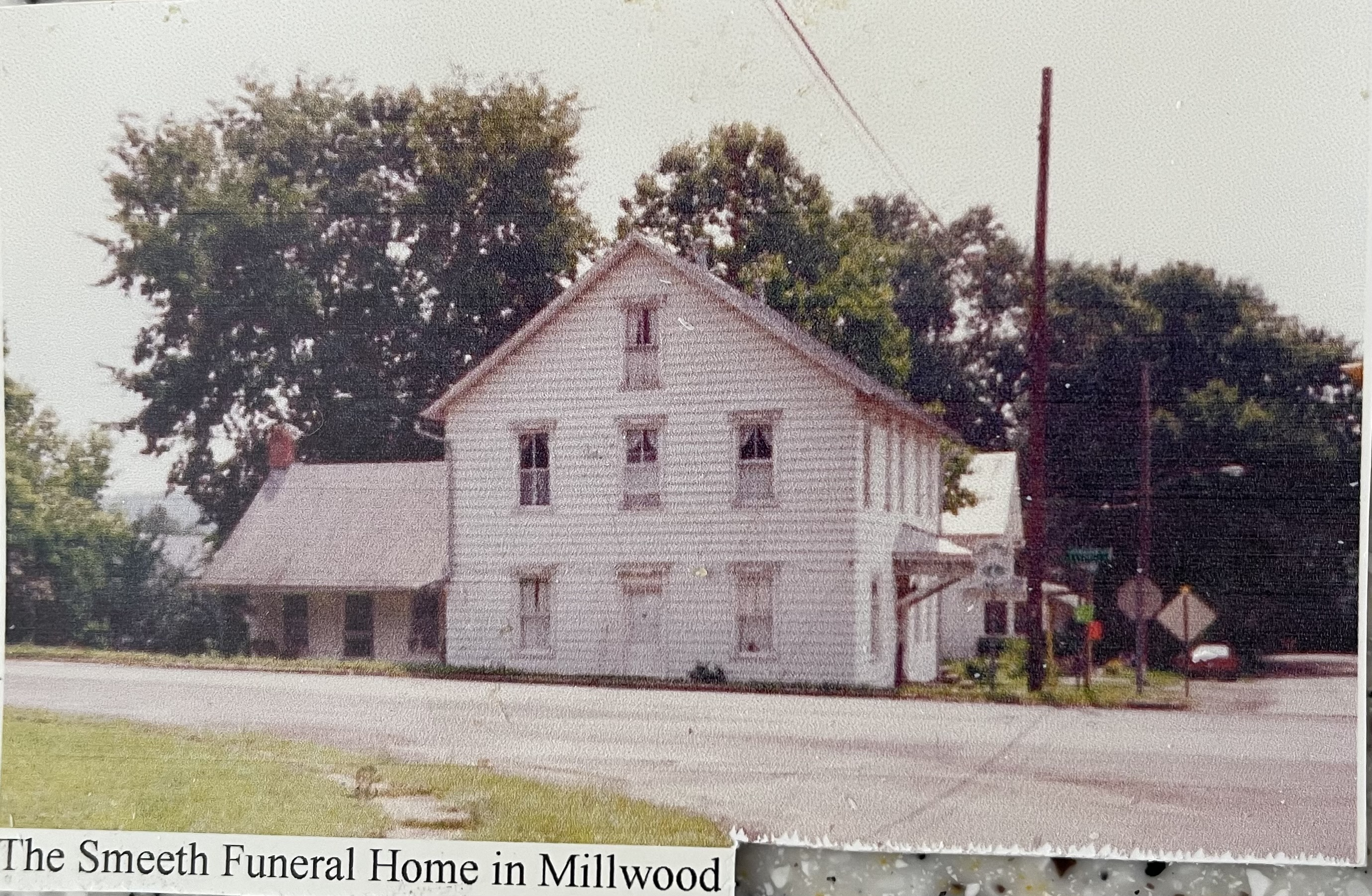
Smeeth funeral home Photo taken 1924 Millwood Ohio

Millwood is an unincorporated community in Knox County, in the U.S. state of Ohio.

== History ==
Millwood was laid out around 1825. A post office called Millwood was established in 1833, and remained in operation until 1907. Some say the community was named for the mill and woods near the original town site, while others believe the name honors one Mr. Millwood, a personal friend of the proprietor.
