= Knox, Knox County, Ohio =

Unincorporated community in Ohio, U.S.

Coordinates: 40°27′27″N 82°31′46″W

Knox is an unincorporated community in Knox County, in the U.S. state of Ohio.

== History ==
A post office called Knox was established in 1826, and remained in operation until 1872.
