= Green Valley, Ohio =

Unincorporated community in Ohio, U.S.

Coordinates: 40°25′30″N 82°34′40″W

Green Valley is an unincorporated community in Knox County, in the U.S. state of Ohio.

== History ==
Green Valley was originally called Newcomerstown, and under the latter name was founded by Cromwell Newcomer, and named for him.
