= Greer, Ohio =

Unincorporated community in Ohio, U.S.

Coordinates: 40°31′20″N 82°12′01″W

Greer is an unincorporated community in Knox County, in the U.S. state of Ohio.

== History ==
A former variant name of Greer was Greersville. Greersville was laid out in 1836 by Robert Greer, and named for him. A post office called Greersville was established in 1851, the name was changed to Greer in 1908, and the post office closed in 1949.
