= Hilliar Township, Knox County, Ohio =

Township in Ohio, US

- Township
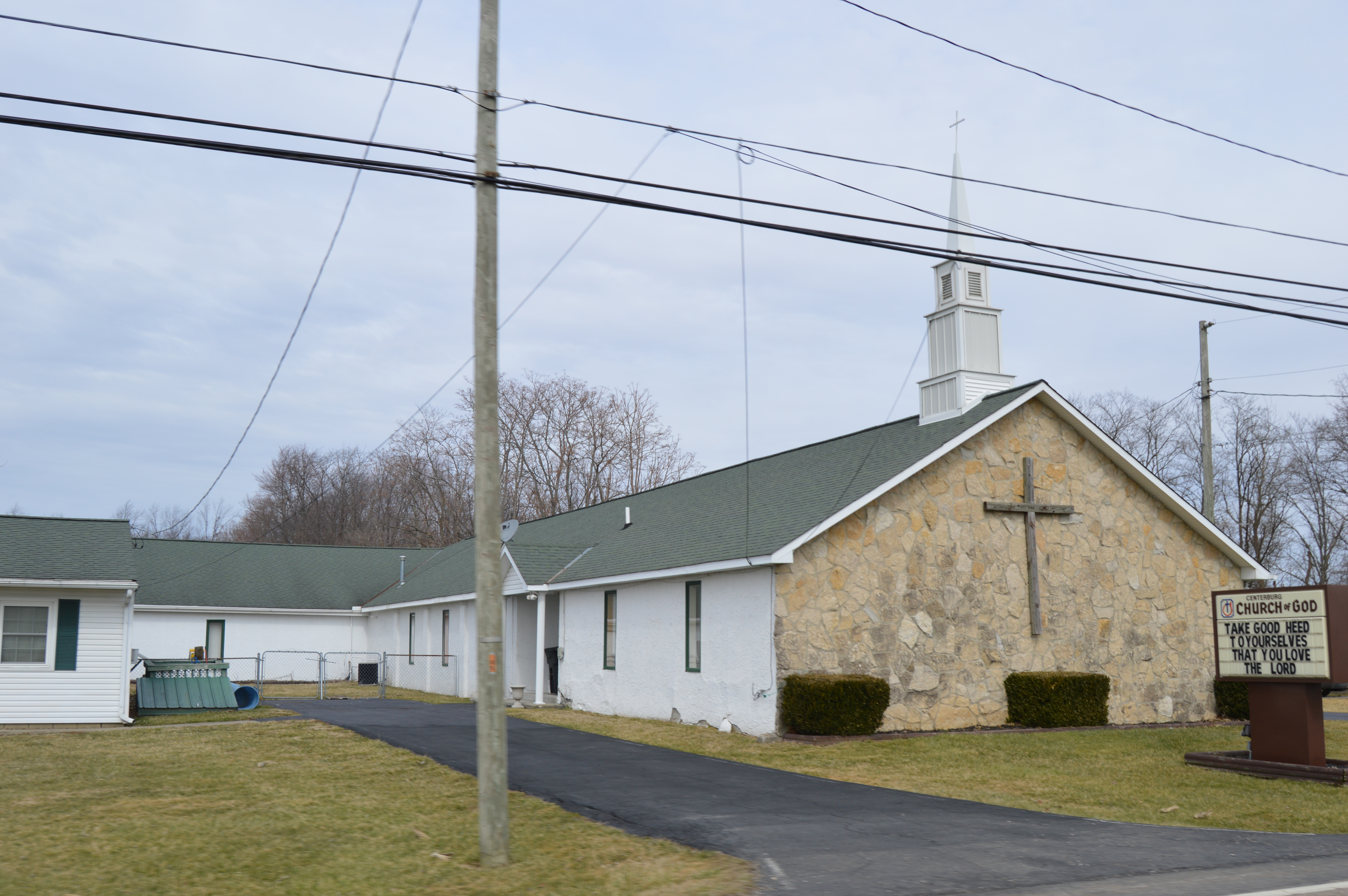
- Church outside of Centerburg

- Location of Hilliar Township in Knox County.
- Coordinates: 40°18′20″N 82°41′48″W
- Country: United States
- State: Ohio
- County: Knox

Area
  - Total: 26.1 sq mi (67.5 km^{2})
  - Land: 26.1 sq mi (67.5 km^{2})
  - Water: 0.039 sq mi (0.1 km^{2})
- Elevation: 1,207 ft (368 m)

Population (2020)
  - Total: 3,781
  - Density: 145/sq mi (56.0/km^{2})
- Time zone: UTC-5 (Eastern (EST))
  - Summer (DST): UTC-4 (EDT)
- ZIP code: 43011
- Area codes: 220 and 740
- FIPS code: 39-35462
- GNIS feature ID: 1086399
- Website: https://www.hilliartownship.org/

Hilliar Township is one of the twenty-two townships of Knox County, Ohio, United States. The 2020 census found 3,781 people in the township.

== Geography ==
Located in the southwestern corner of the county, it borders the following townships:

- South Bloomfield Township, Morrow County - north
- Liberty Township - northeast corner
- Milford Township - east
- Bennington Township, Licking County - southeast corner
- Hartford Township, Licking County - south
- Trenton Township, Delaware County - southwest corner
- Porter Township, Delaware County - west
- Bennington Township, Morrow County - northwest corner

The village of Centerburg is located in central Hilliar Township.

The farthest west township in Knox County, it is the only township that borders Delaware County.

== Name and history ==
Hilliar Township was established in 1818. It was named for Dr. Richard Hilliar, a pioneer settler and landowner.

It is the only Hilliar Township statewide.

== Government ==
The township is governed by a three-member board of trustees, who are elected in November of odd-numbered years to a four-year term beginning on the following January 1. Two are elected in the year after the presidential election and one is elected in the year before it. There is also an elected township fiscal officer, who serves a four-year term beginning on April 1 of the year after the election, which is held in November of the year before the presidential election. Vacancies in the fiscal officership or on the board of trustees are filled by the remaining trustees.
