= Artanna, Ohio =

Unincorporated community in Ohio, U.S.

Artanna
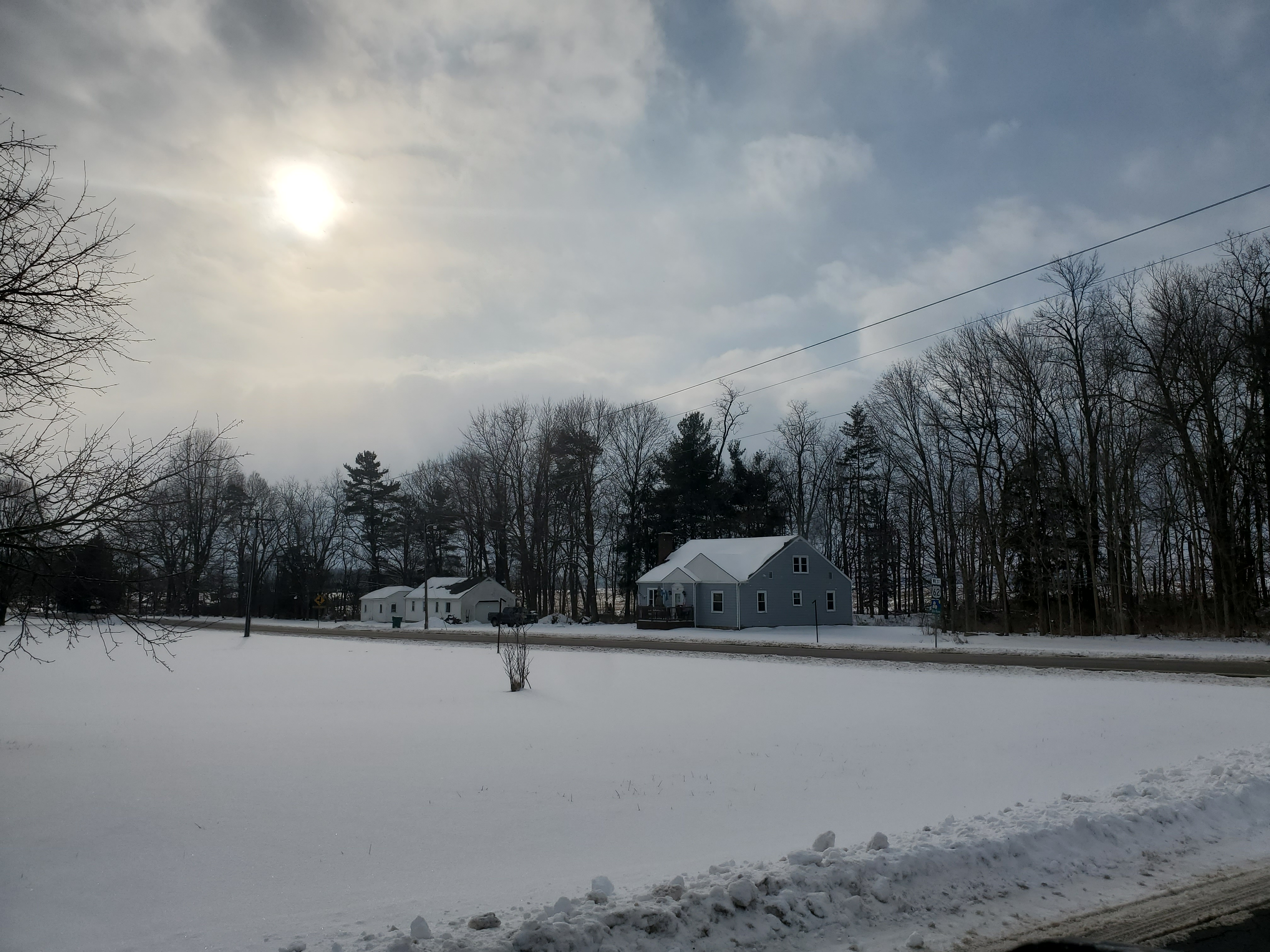
- Artanna, Ohio, in 2022
- Interactive map of Artanna
- Coordinates: 40°19′19″N 82°18′38″W
- Country: United States

Artanna is an unincorporated community in Knox County, in the U.S. state of Ohio.

== History ==
The community's name is an amalgamation of Arthur "Art" (1910–1992) and Anna Wolfe (1921–2015), the proprietors of a local gas station that opened in the early 1930s. For a time the community hosted cabins for travelers, owned by the same couple.
