= Clinton Township, Knox County, Ohio =

Township in Ohio, US

Clinton Township, Knox County Ohio
- Township
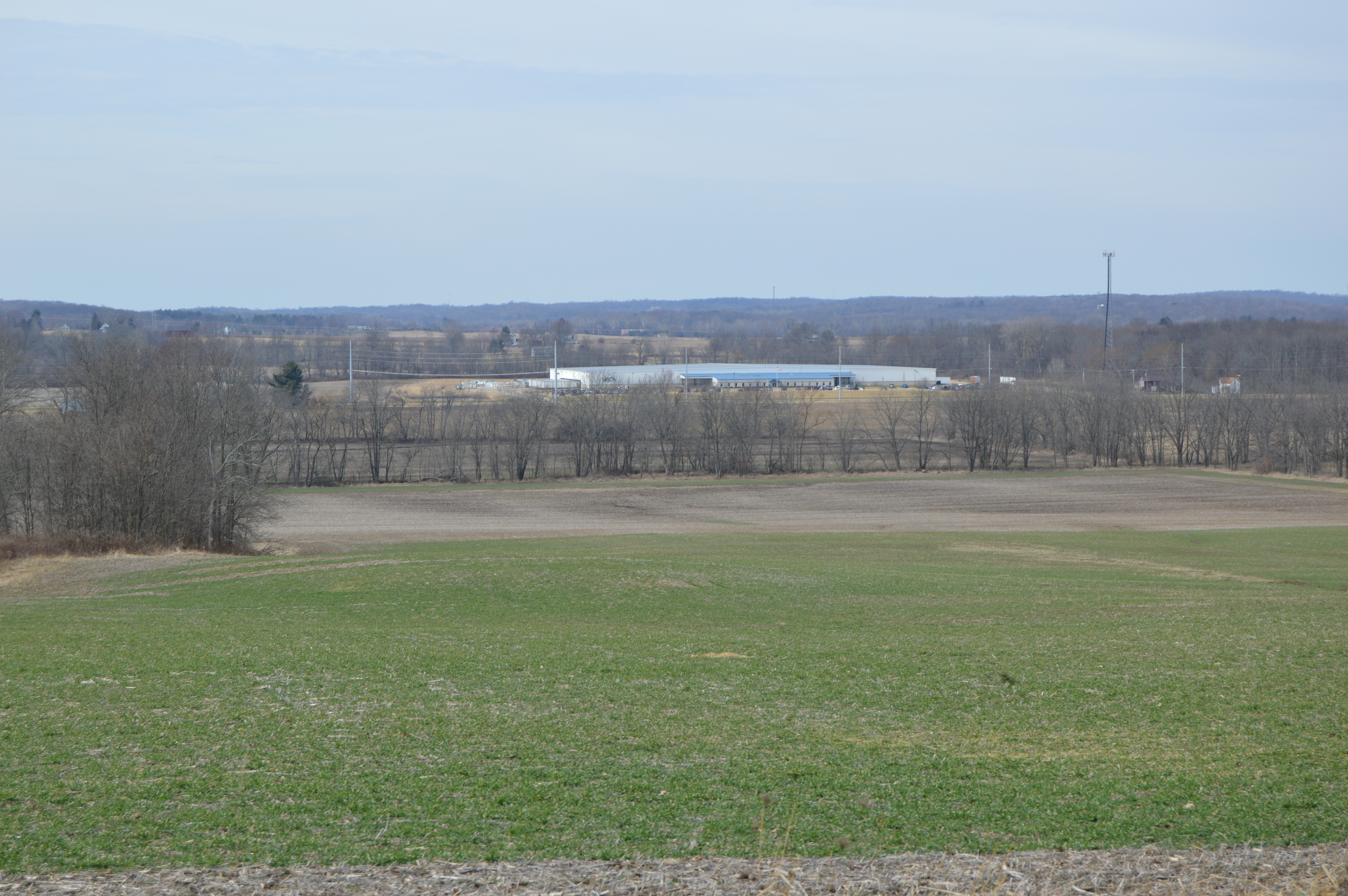
- Farmland on Range Line Road

- Location of Clinton Township in Knox County.
- Coordinates: 40°22′40″N 82°29′53″W
- Country: United States
- State: Ohio
- County: Knox

Area
  - Total: 15.8 sq mi (40.8 km^{2})
  - Land: 15.6 sq mi (40.5 km^{2})
  - Water: 0.12 sq mi (0.3 km^{2})
- Elevation: 1,027 ft (313 m)

Population (2020)
  - Total: 2,886
  - Density: 185/sq mi (71.3/km^{2})
- Time zone: UTC-5 (Eastern (EST))
  - Summer (DST): UTC-4 (EDT)
- FIPS code: 39-16140
- GNIS feature ID: 1086395

Clinton Township is one of the twenty-two townships of Knox County, Ohio, United States. The 2020 census found 2,886 people in the township.

== Geography ==
Located in the west central part of the county, it borders the following townships:

- Morris Township - north
- Monroe Township - northeast
- Pleasant Township - east
- Miller Township - south
- Milford Township - southwest corner
- Liberty Township - west
- Wayne Township - northwest corner

Much of eastern Clinton Township is occupied by the city of Mount Vernon, the county seat of Knox County. The census-designated place of South Mount Vernon is in the center of the township, adjacent to Mount Vernon.

== Name and history ==
Clinton Township was established in 1808.

It is one of seven Clinton Townships statewide.

== Government ==
The township is governed by a three-member board of trustees, who are elected in November of odd-numbered years to a four-year term beginning on the following January 1. Two are elected in the year after the presidential election and one is elected in the year before it. There is also an elected township fiscal officer, who serves a four-year term beginning on April 1 of the year after the election, which is held in November of the year before the presidential election. Vacancies in the fiscal officership or on the board of trustees are filled by the remaining trustees.
