= Pipesville, Ohio =

Unincorporated community in Ohio, U.S.

Coordinates: 40°21′02″N 82°18′41″W

Pipesville is an unincorporated community in Knox County, in the U.S. state of Ohio.

== History ==
A post office called Pipesville was established in 1872, and remained in operation until 1902. The community was named for Warren Pipes, first postmaster.

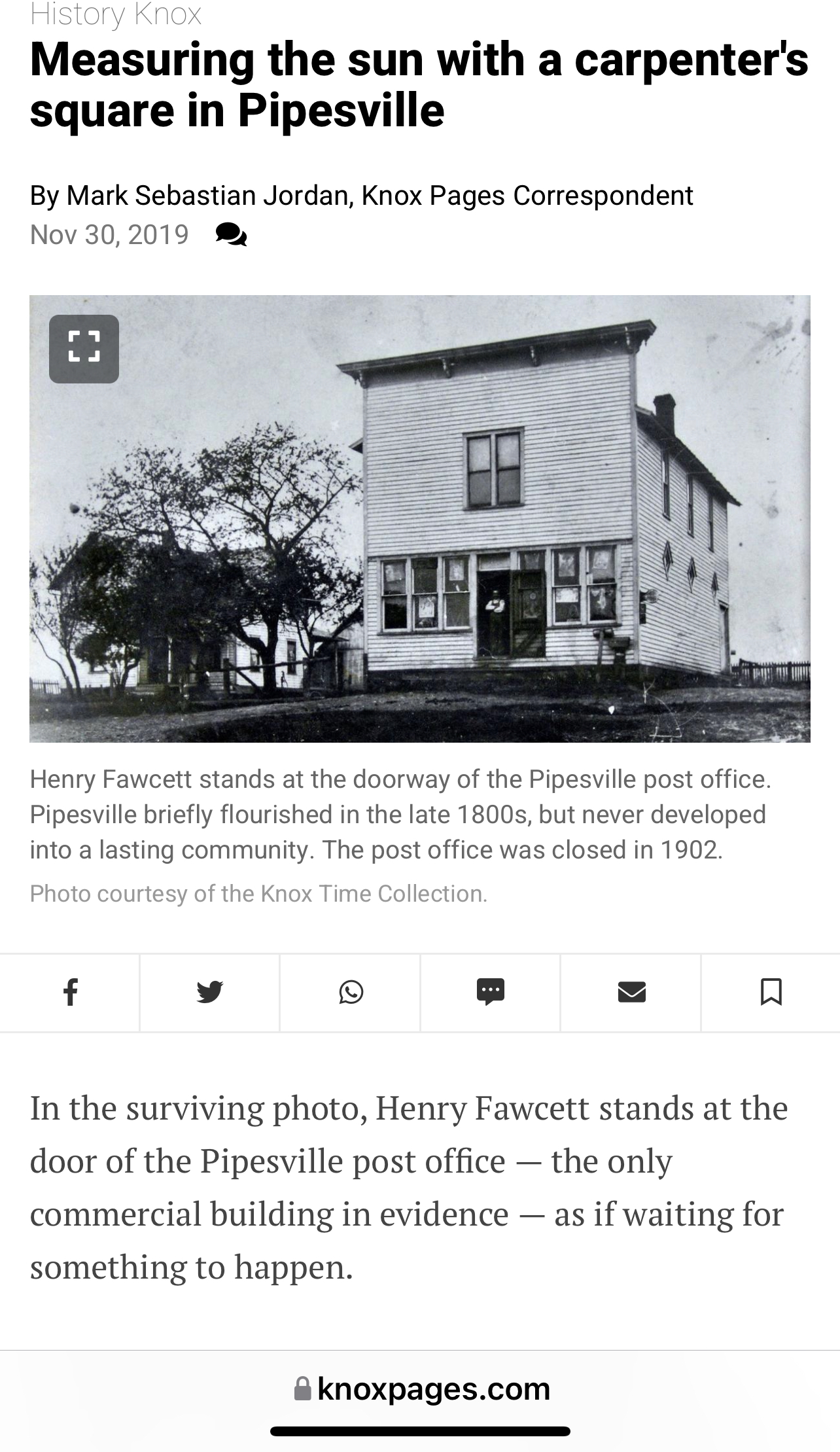
Post Office Pipesville Ohio
