= Ankenytown, Ohio =

Unincorporated community in Ohio, U.S.

Coordinates: 40°32′03″N 82°30′18″W

Ankenytown is an unincorporated community in Knox County, in the U.S. state of Ohio.

== History ==
A post office called Ankenytown operated between 1848 and 1938. The community was named for George Ankeny, an early settler and afterward state legislator. A variant name was Squeal.
