= Berlin Township, Knox County, Ohio =

Township in Ohio, US

Berlin Township, Knox County Ohio
- Township
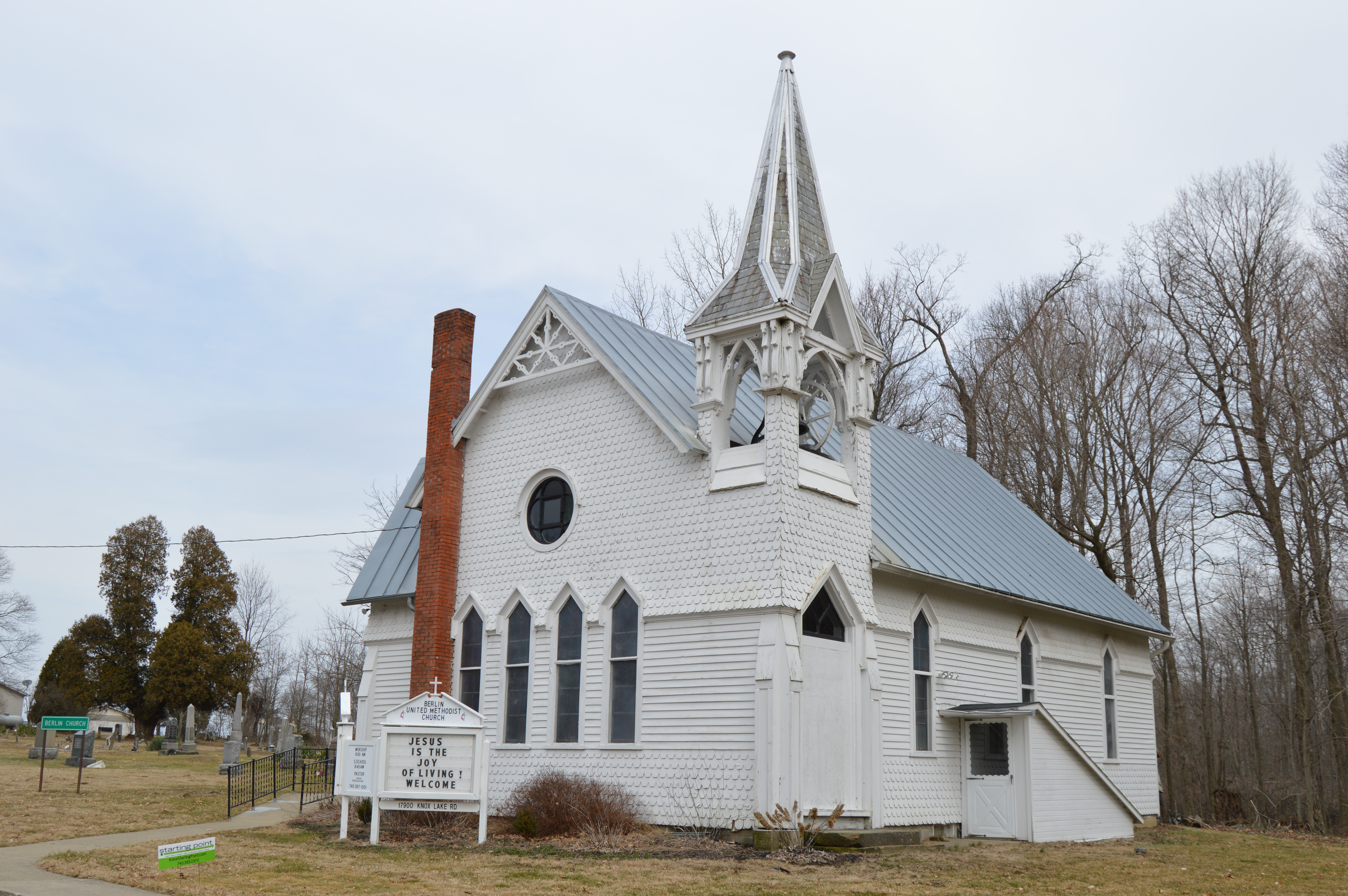
- Berlin United Methodist Church

- Location of Berlin Township in Knox County.
- Coordinates: 40°31′6″N 82°30′17″W
- Country: United States
- State: Ohio
- County: Knox

Area
  - Total: 19.2 sq mi (49.6 km^{2})
  - Land: 18.4 sq mi (47.7 km^{2})
  - Water: 0.77 sq mi (2.0 km^{2})
- Elevation: 1,150 ft (350 m)

Population (2020)
  - Total: 1,772
  - Density: 96.2/sq mi (37.1/km^{2})
- Time zone: UTC-5 (Eastern (EST))
  - Summer (DST): UTC-4 (EDT)
- FIPS code: 39-05844
- GNIS feature ID: 1086391

Berlin Township is one of the twenty-two townships of Knox County, Ohio, United States. The 2020 census found 1,772 people in the township.

== Geography ==
Located in the northern part of the county, it borders the following townships:

- Jefferson Township, Richland County - north
- Worthington Township, Richland County - northeast corner
- Pike Township - east
- Morris Township - south
- Wayne Township - southwest corner
- Middlebury Township - west

No municipalities are located in Berlin Township, although the unincorporated community of Ankenytown lies in the north central part of the township.

== Name and history ==
Berlin Township was established in 1822. It was named after Berlin, Connecticut, the hometown of many of its early settlers.

Statewide, other Berlin Townships are located in Delaware, Erie, Holmes, and Mahoning counties.

== Government ==
The township is governed by a three-member board of trustees, who are elected in November of odd-numbered years to a four-year term beginning on the following January 1. Two are elected in the year after the presidential election and one is elected in the year before it. There is also an elected township fiscal officer, who serves a four-year term beginning on April 1 of the year after the election, which is held in November of the year before the presidential election. Vacancies in the fiscal officership or on the board of trustees are filled by the remaining trustees.
