= Burlington Township, Ohio =

Township in Ohio, US

Burlington Township, Licking County, Ohio
- Township
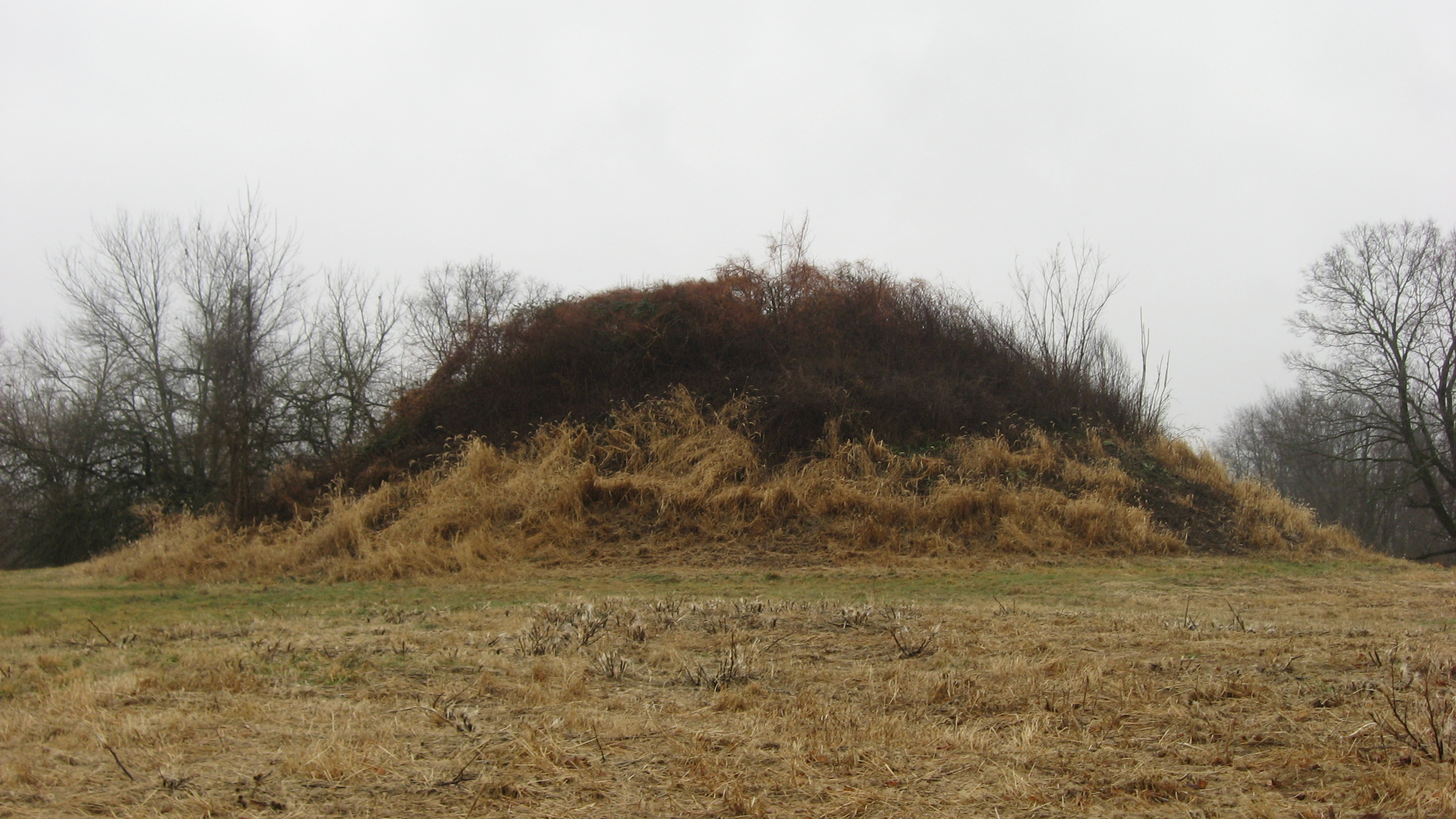
- The Dixon Mound in Homer

- Location in Licking County
- Coordinates: 40°13′27″N 82°30′54″W
- Country: United States
- State: Ohio
- County: Licking

Area
  - Total: 25.6 sq mi (66.2 km^{2})
  - Land: 25.5 sq mi (66.1 km^{2})
  - Water: 0.039 sq mi (0.1 km^{2})
- Elevation: 968 ft (295 m)

Population (2020)
  - Total: 1,209
  - Density: 47.4/sq mi (18.3/km^{2})
- Time zone: UTC-5 (Eastern (EST))
  - Summer (DST): UTC-4 (EDT)
- FIPS code: 39-10366
- GNIS feature ID: 1086454
- Website: https://burlington-township.com/

Burlington Township is one of the 25 townships of Licking County, Ohio, United States. As of the 2020 census, the population was 1,209.

== Geography ==
Located on the northern edge of the county, it borders the following townships:

- Miller Township, Knox County - north
- Morgan Township, Knox County - northeast
- Washington Township - east
- McKean Township - south
- Liberty Township - southwest corner
- Bennington Township - west
- Milford Township, Knox County - northwest corner

No municipalities are located in Burlington Township, although the unincorporated community of Homer lies in the township's north.

== Name and history ==
It is the only Burlington Township statewide.

== Government ==
The township is governed by a three-member board of trustees, who are elected in November of odd-numbered years to a four-year term beginning on the following January 1. Two are elected in the year after the presidential election and one is elected in the year before it. There is also an elected township fiscal officer, who serves a four-year term beginning on April 1 of the year after the election, which is held in November of the year before the presidential election. Vacancies in the fiscal officership or on the board of trustees are filled by the remaining trustees.
