= Morgan Township, Knox County, Ohio =

Township in Ohio, US

Morgan Township, Knox County Ohio
- Township
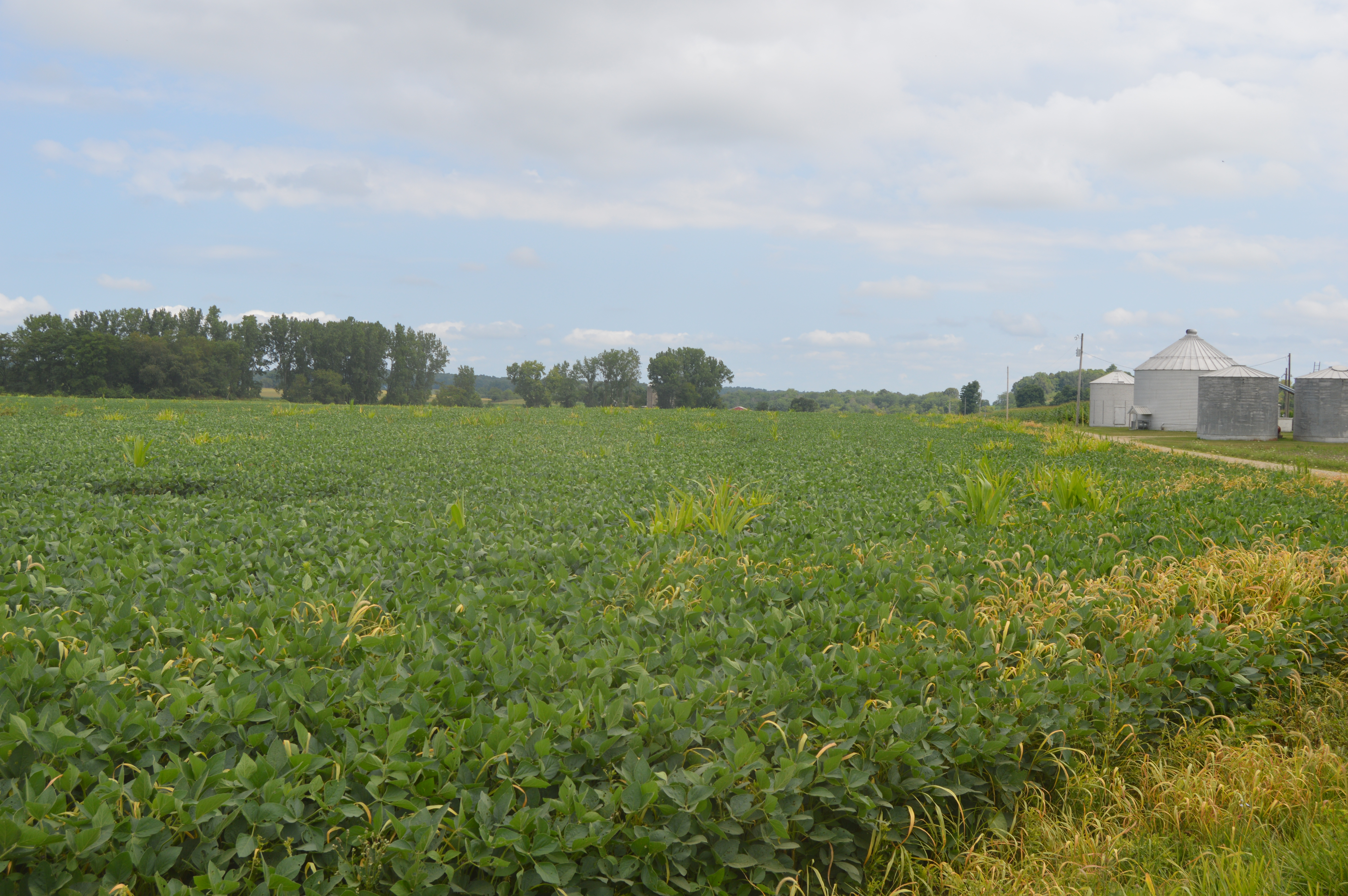
- Fields along Spray Lane in the township's northeast

- Location of Morgan Township in Knox County.
- Coordinates: 40°16′52″N 82°25′17″W
- Country: United States
- State: Ohio
- County: Knox

Area
  - Total: 26.0 sq mi (67.4 km^{2})
  - Land: 26.0 sq mi (67.4 km^{2})
  - Water: 0 sq mi (0.0 km^{2})
- Elevation: 1,027 ft (313 m)

Population (2020)
  - Total: 1,034
  - Density: 39.7/sq mi (15.3/km^{2})
- Time zone: UTC-5 (Eastern (EST))
  - Summer (DST): UTC-4 (EDT)
- FIPS code: 39-52108
- GNIS feature ID: 1086408

Morgan Township is one of the twenty-two townships of Knox County, Ohio, United States. The 2020 census found 1,034 people in the township.

== Geography ==
Located in the southern part of the county, it borders the following townships:

- Pleasant Township - north
- Harrison Township - northeast corner
- Clay Township - east
- Washington Township, Licking County - south
- Burlington Township, Licking County - southwest
- Miller Township - west

Part of the village of Utica is located in southern Morgan Township.

== Name and history ==
Morgan Township was organized in 1808. It is named for Daniel Morgan.

It is one of six Morgan Townships statewide.

== Government ==
The township is governed by a three-member board of trustees, who are elected in November of odd-numbered years to a four-year term beginning on the following January 1. Two are elected in the year after the presidential election and one is elected in the year before it. There is also an elected township fiscal officer, who serves a four-year term beginning on April 1 of the year after the election, which is held in November of the year before the presidential election. Vacancies in the fiscal officership or on the board of trustees are filled by the remaining trustees.

== Public Safety ==
Law Enforcement: Knox County Sheriff's Office
Fire & EMS: County Line Joint Fire District
