= Hunt, Ohio =

Unincorporated community in Ohio, US

Coordinates: 40°19′14″N 82°28′14″W

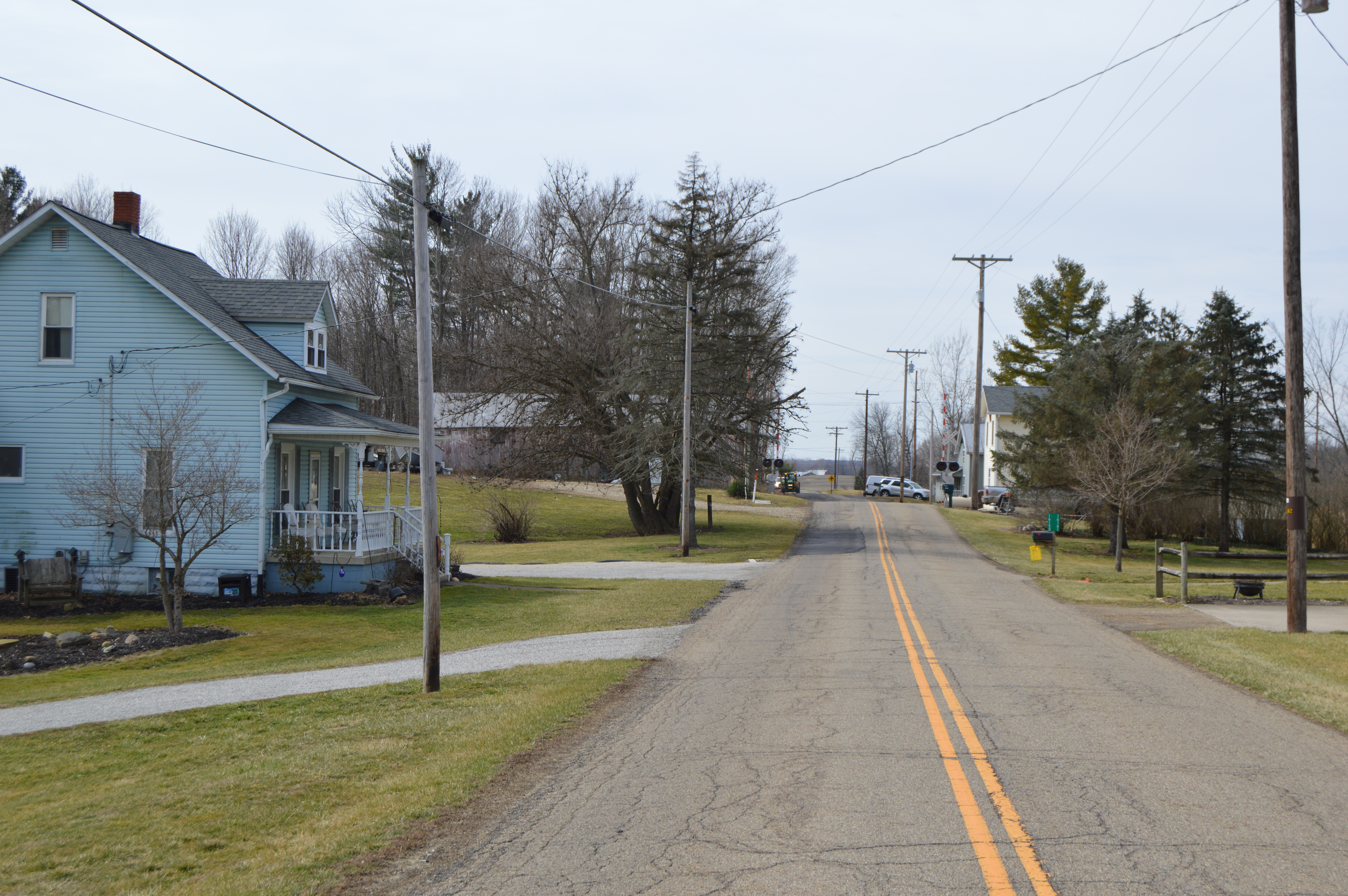
Houses on Sycamore Road

Hunt is an unincorporated community in Knox County, in the U.S. state of Ohio.

== History ==
A former variant name was Hunt's Station. Hunt's Station had its start in 1851 when the railroad was extended to that point. A post office called Hunts Station was established in 1866, the name was changed to Hunt in 1882, and the post office closed in 1912.
