= Waterford, Knox County, Ohio =

Unincorporated community in Ohio, U.S.

Coordinates: 40°32′33″N 82°37′27″W

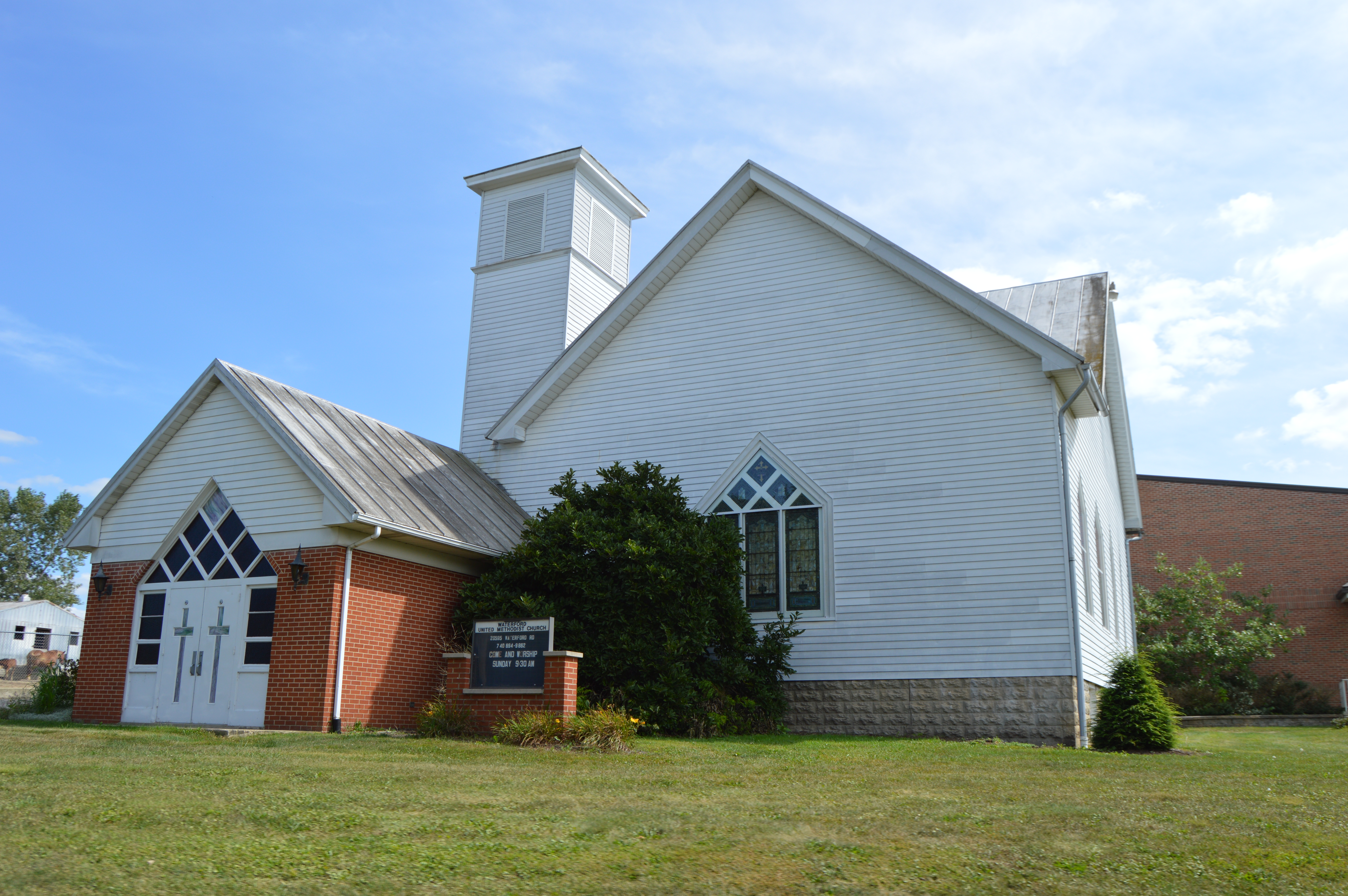
Methodist church

Waterford is an unincorporated community in Knox County, in the U.S. state of Ohio.

== History ==
Waterford was laid out in 1841. The post office at Waterford was called Levering. The Levering post office was established in 1836, and remained in operation until 1903.
