= Brandon, Ohio =

Unincorporated community in Ohio, U.S.

Coordinates: 40°18′44″N 82°30′33″W

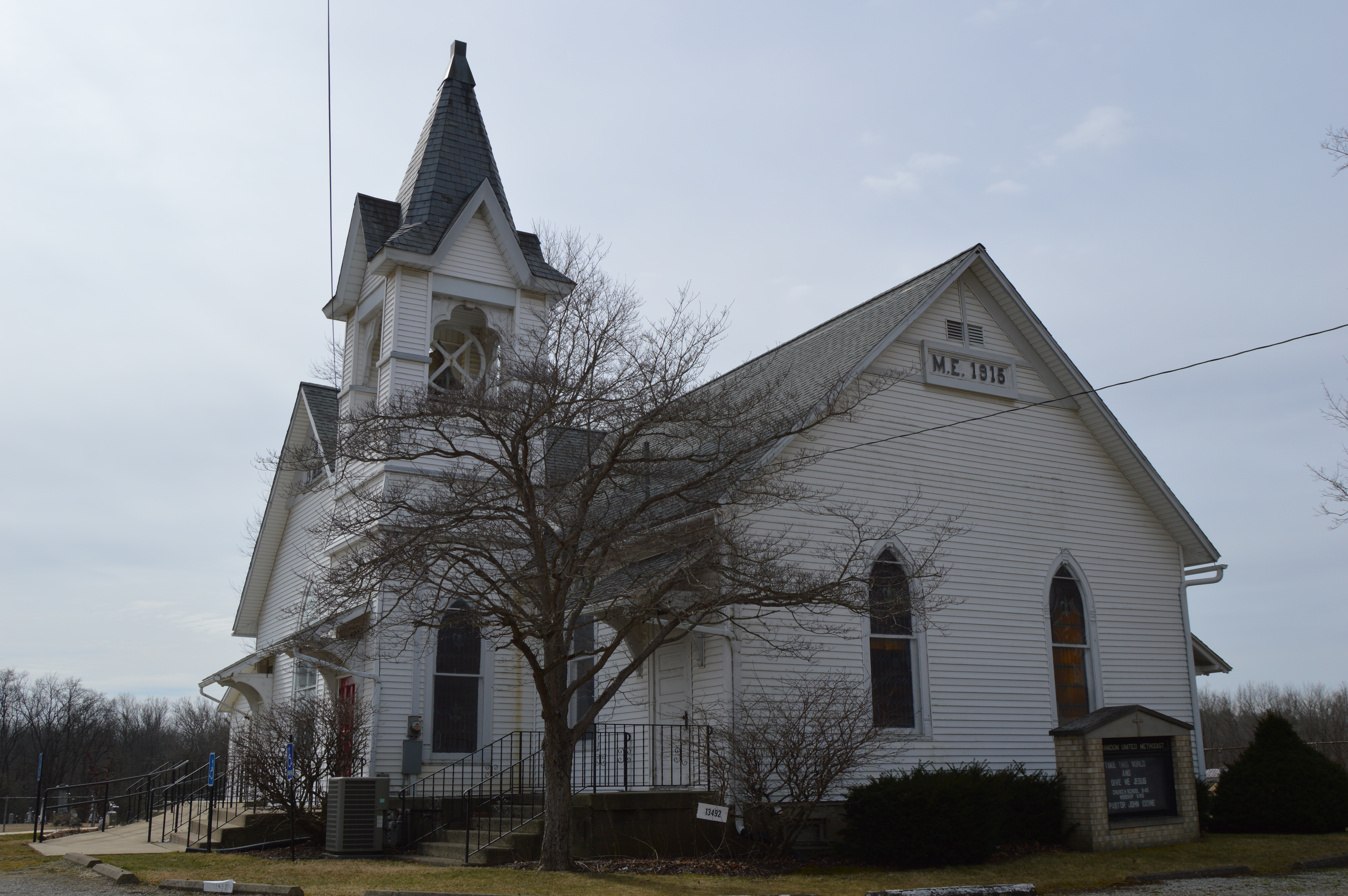
Methodist church

Brandon is an unincorporated community in Knox County, in the U.S. state of Ohio.

== History ==
Brandon was originally called Four Corners, then Hildreth, but the site was never legally platted on account of a land dispute in the 1840s. A post office was first established there under the name Hildreths in 1839. The post office's name was changed to Brandon in 1848, and remained in operation until 1902.
