= Rossville, Knox County, Ohio =

Coordinates: 40°26′16″N 82°15′39″W

Rossville is an extinct town in Knox County, in the U.S. state of Ohio. The town was located on local roads 0.5 miles (0.80 km) south of Danville.

== History ==
Rossville had its start when the railroad was extended to that point. The town was named for Jacob Ross, proprietor.
