= Bennington Township, Licking County, Ohio =

Township in Ohio, US

- Township
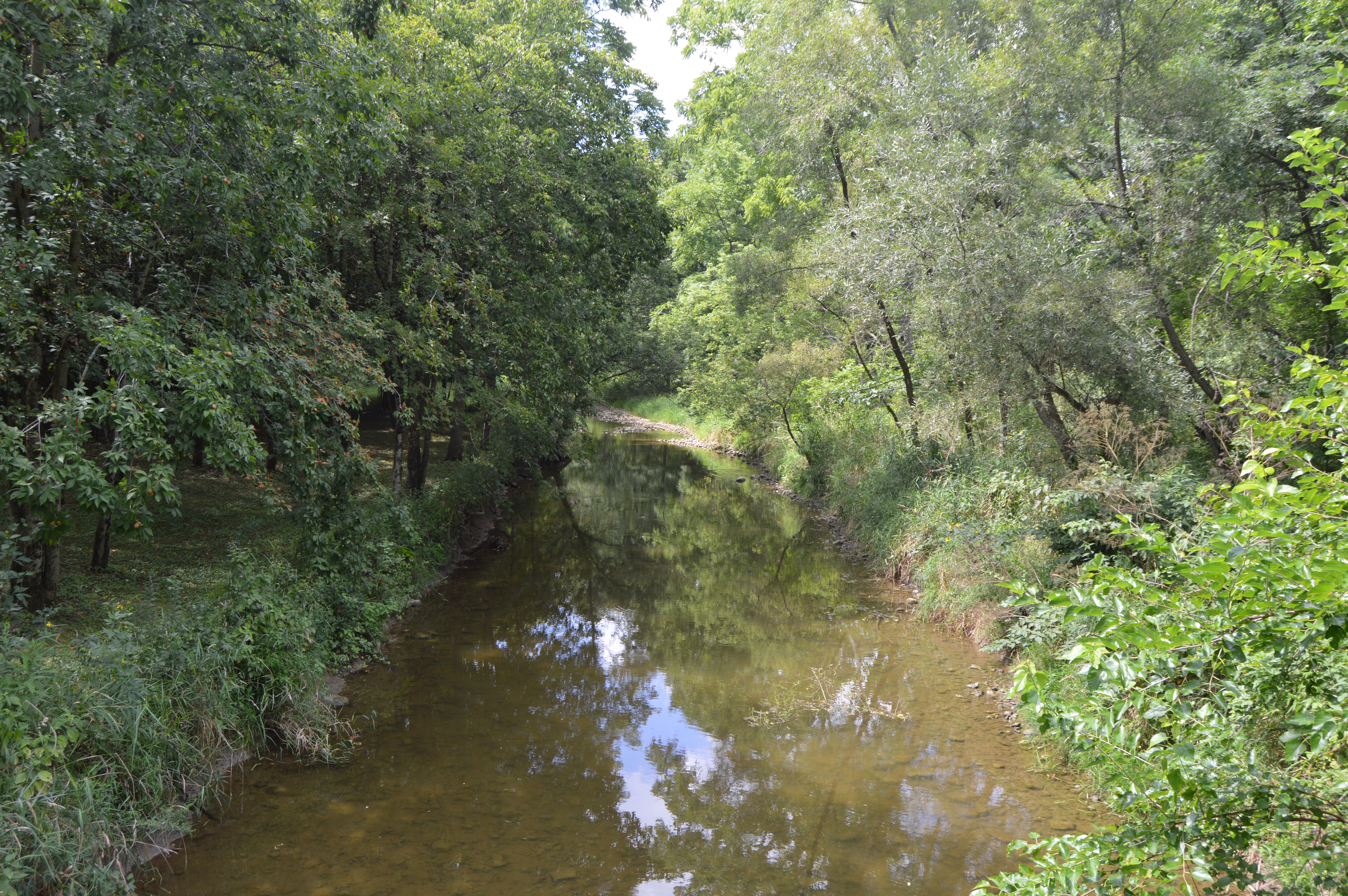
- Otter Fork of the Licking River

- Location in Licking County
- Coordinates: 40°14′19″N 82°36′13″W
- Country: United States
- State: Ohio
- County: Licking

Area
  - Total: 27.14 sq mi (70.28 km^{2})
  - Land: 27.07 sq mi (70.11 km^{2})
  - Water: 0.066 sq mi (0.17 km^{2})
- Elevation: 1,129 ft (344 m)

Population (2020)
  - Total: 1,682
  - Density: 62.14/sq mi (23.99/km^{2})
- Time zone: UTC-5 (Eastern (EST))
  - Summer (DST): UTC-4 (EDT)
- FIPS code: 39-05494
- GNIS feature ID: 1086452
- Website: benningtontownshiplc.org

Bennington Township is one of the 25 townships of Licking County, Ohio, United States. As of the 2020 census, the population was 1,682.

== Geography ==
Located on the northern edge of the county, it borders the following townships:

- Milford Township, Knox County - north
- Miller Township, Knox County - northeast corner
- Burlington Township - east
- McKean Township - southeast corner
- Liberty Township - south
- Monroe Township - southwest corner
- Hartford Township - west
- Hilliar Township, Knox County - northwest corner

No municipalities are located in Bennington Township.

== Name and history ==
Statewide, the only other Bennington Township is located in Morrow County.

== Government ==
The township is governed by a three-member board of trustees, who are elected in November of odd-numbered years to a four-year term beginning on the following January 1. Two are elected in the year after the presidential election and one is elected in the year before it. There is also an elected township fiscal officer, who serves a four-year term beginning on April 1 of the year after the election, which is held in November of the year before the presidential election. Vacancies in the fiscal officership or on the board of trustees are filled by the remaining trustees.
