= Lucerne, Knox County, Ohio =

Unincorporated community in Ohio, U.S.

Coordinates: 40°27′45″N 82°37′43″W

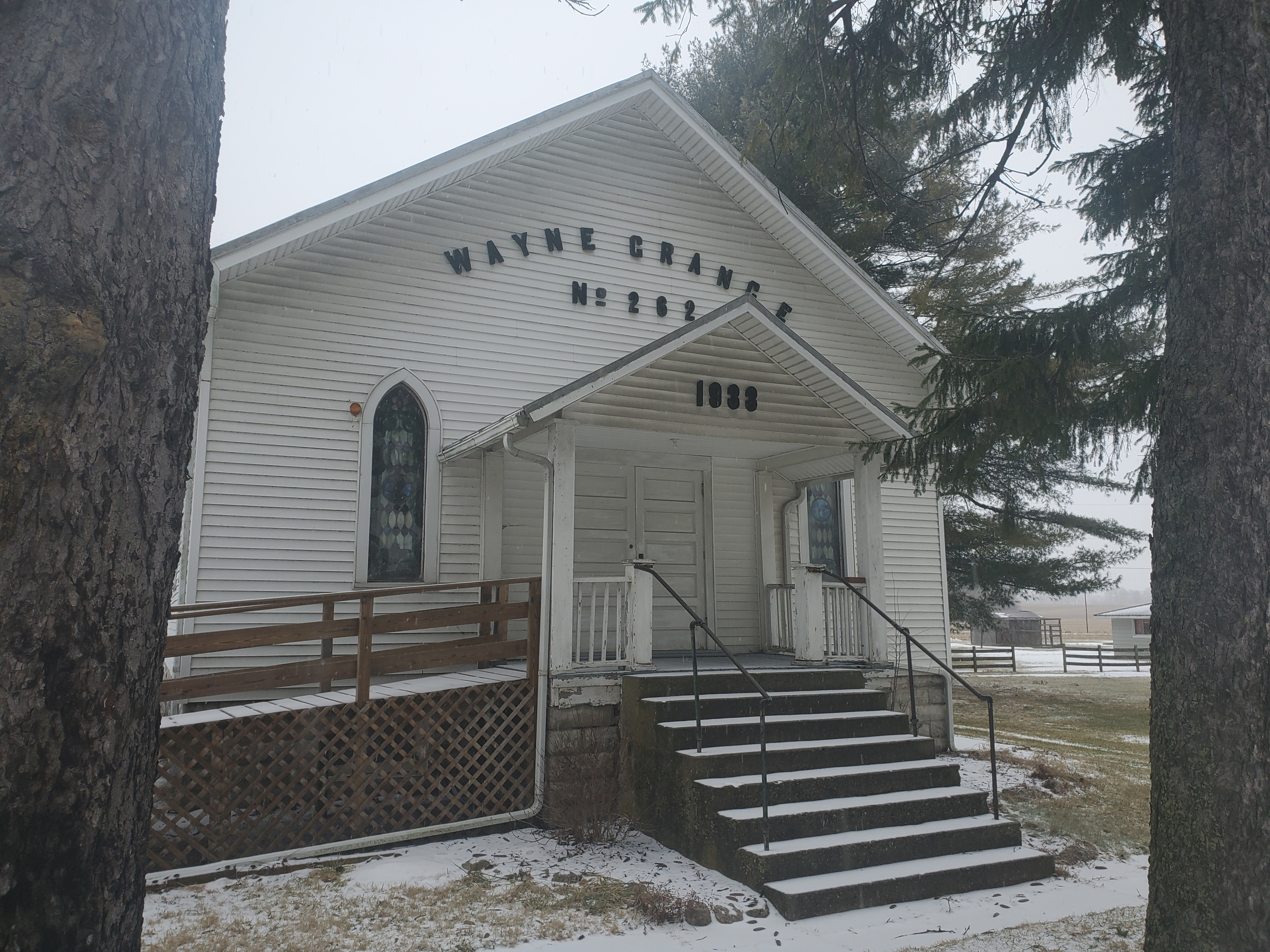
The Grange hall in Lucerne

Lucerne is an unincorporated community in Knox County, in the U.S. state of Ohio.

== History ==
Lucerne was founded in the 1830s. The community was named after Lake Lucerne, in Switzerland. A post office called Youngs Mills was established in 1830, and renamed Lucerne in 1850; the post office closed in 1873.
