= Knox County Courthouse (Ohio) =

Local government building in the United States

- U.S. National Register of Historic Places
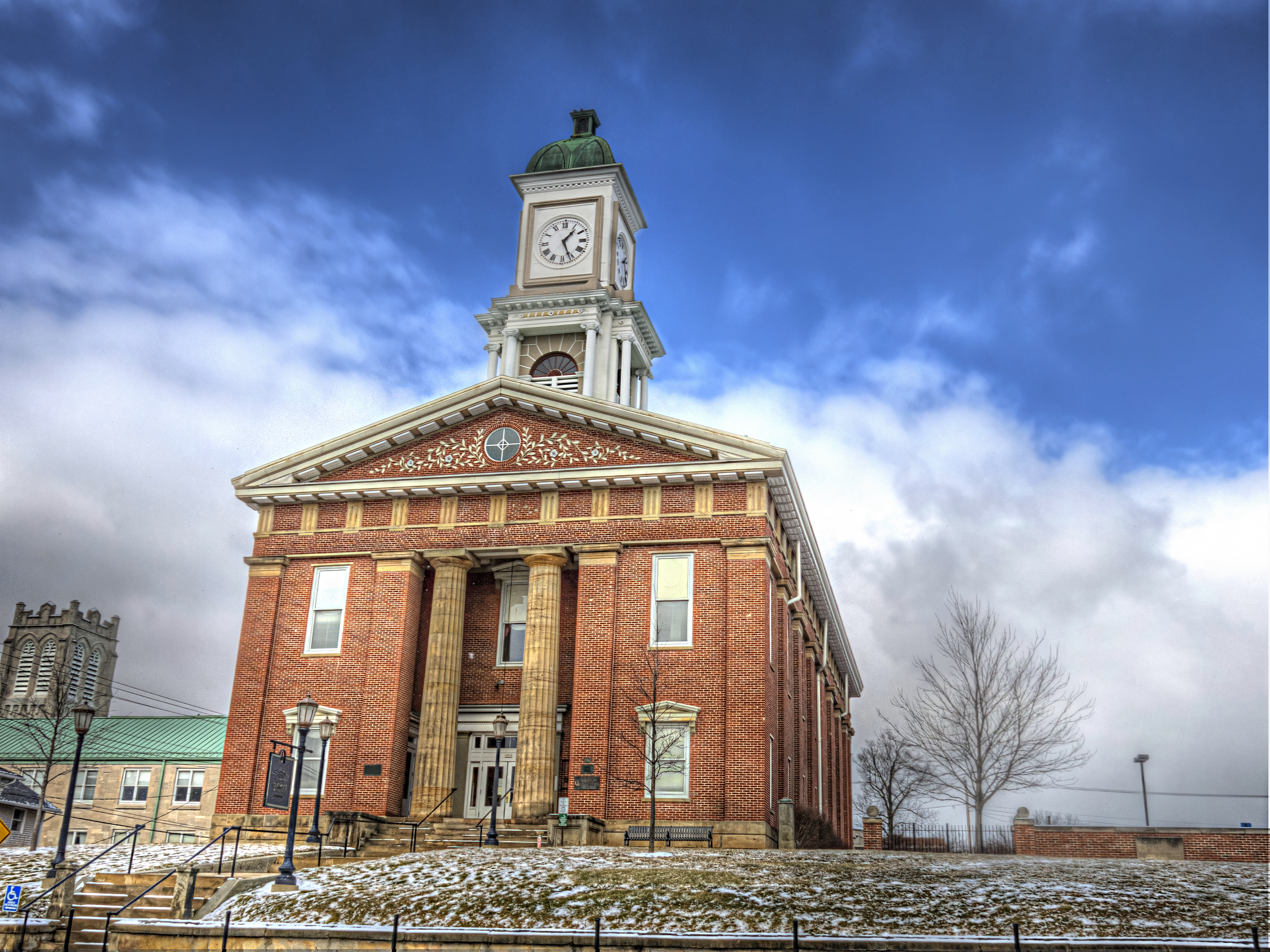
- The courthouse in Mt. Vernon, Ohio

- Location within Ohio Location within the United States
- Location: High St., Mount Vernon, Ohio
- Coordinates: 40°23′37″N 82°28′57″W
- Built: 1855
- Architect: Daniel Clark; John Jennings
- Architectural style: Greek Revival
- NRHP reference No.: 73001484
- Added to NRHP: June 4, 1973

The Knox County Courthouse is a historic building located on High Street in Mount Vernon, Ohio, United States. It was built in 1855 in the Greek Revival style of architecture. It was listed on the National Register of Historic Places in 1973.
