= North Liberty, Ohio =

Unincorporated community in Ohio, U.S.

North Liberty
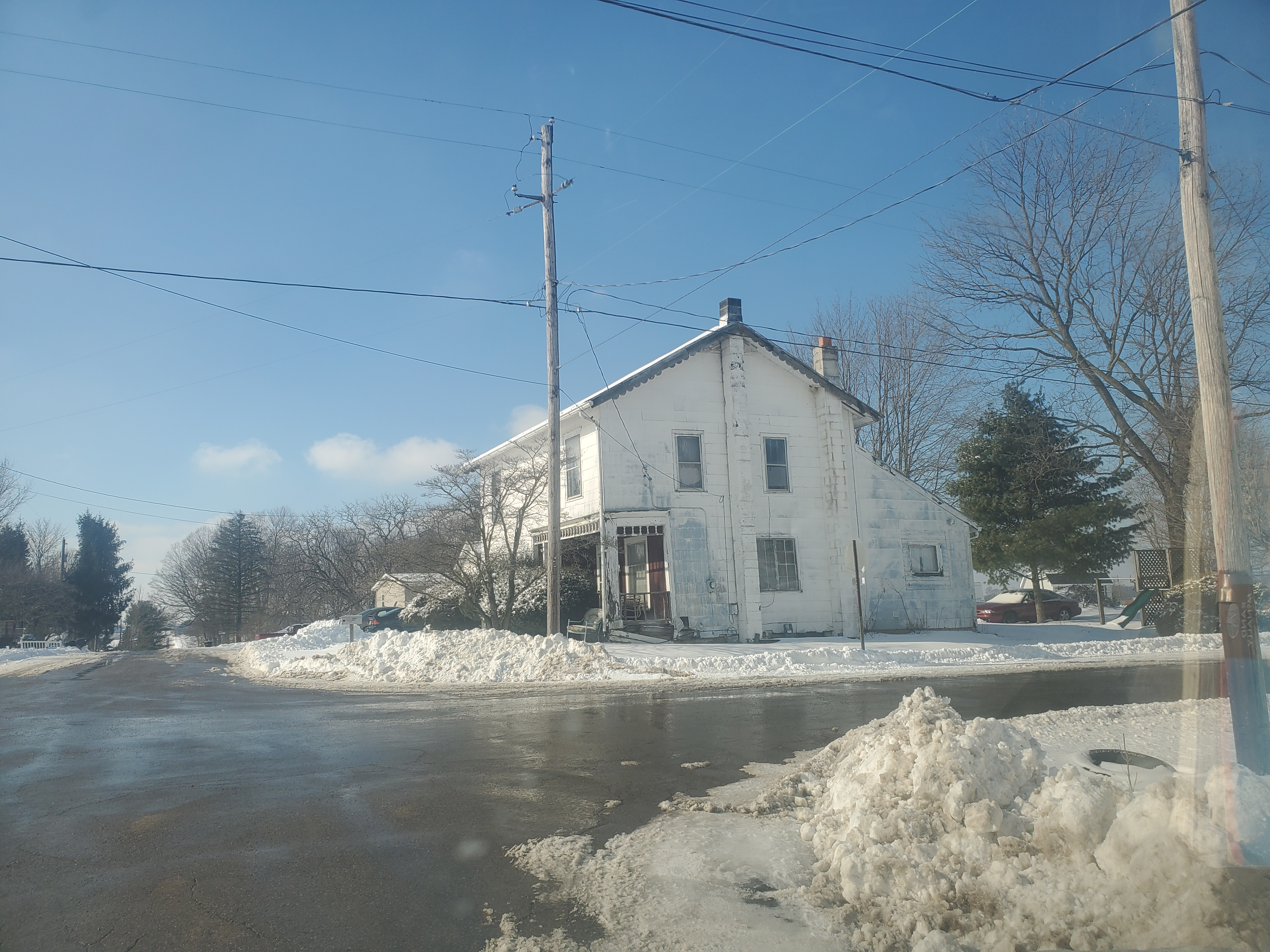
- North Liberty in 2022
- Interactive map of North Liberty
- Coordinates: 40°32′15″N 82°24′30″W
- Established: 1838

North Liberty is an unincorporated community in Knox County, in the U.S. state of Ohio.

== History ==
North Liberty was laid out in 1838. A post office called North Liberty was established in 1848, and remained in operation until 1901.
