= List of former state routes in Ohio (223–270) =

This is a list of former state routes in Ohio since 1923 with route numbers from 223 through 270 inclusive.

== SR 223 (1923–1926) ==
State Route 223
- Location: Ross–McGonigle
- Existed: 1923–1926

SR 223 was a state route in southern Butler County that existed from 1923 until 1926. Beginning near Ross at SR 128, it traveled north through Millville before ending at SR 126 in McGonigle. Most of the route today is a part of US 27 however the southernmost mile (1.6 km) of the former route is now a township road as US 27 was moved onto an expressway.

== SR 223 (1927–1930) ==
State Route 223
- Location: Holland
- Existed: 1927–1930

SR 223 was the designation for Perrysburg-Holland Road, near Holland, that had numerous route numbers during the road's time as a state highway. The SR 223 number was applied to the road connecting US 20 in Lucas County to SR 2 just south of Holland between 1927 and 1930. Prior to the 223 number, the road was known as SR 102 and after 1930, the road was called SR 283. Subsequently, for the last two years the road was part of the state highway system, the road was known as SR 326.

== SR 224 (1923–1933) ==
State Route 224
- Location: Hamilton–Fairhaven
- Existed: 1923–1933

SR 224 was a state highway that connected Hamilton to the Indiana state line near Fairhaven. The route existed from 1923 until 1933 when it was renumbered to SR 177 due to the addition of US 224 in the northern section of the state.

== SR 226 (1923–1927) ==
State Route 226
- Location: Minerva
- Existed: 1923–1927

SR 226 was a short state route in the vicinity of Minerva that existed from 1923 until 1927. The route was located north of the village and connected US 30 at its southern end with SR 80 at its northern end. After 1927, the road appeared on Ohio maps as an unnumbered state highway for three years before being deleted altogether. By 1980, the road became a state road again when SR 183 was moved off of its previous alignment on Market Street through Minerva to a new route along US 30.

== SR 227 ==
State Route 227
- Location: Jewett
- Existed: 1923–1962

SR 227 was a short connector between SR 9 and SR 151 west of Jewett, Harrison County. At the time SR 227 existed from 1923 until 1962, SR 151 traveled on a more winding route involving a grade crossing west of the village. SR 9 stayed south of the railroad tracks before entering the village. SR 227 was deleted when SR 151 was routed along a high-speed alignment involving the use of SR 9 south and west of Jewett thus negating the need for a state-maintained connector.

Browse numbered routes
← SR 226	OH	→ SR 228

== SR 229 (1923–1924) ==
State Route 229
- Location: Colby–Bellevue
- Existed: 1923–1924

SR 229 was a short connector between Colby and Bellevue that briefly existed in the 1920s. The route ran from SR 101 to SR 2 (now a part of US 20 and existed for two years. After 1924, the route became a part of SR 106.

== SR 229 (1925–1926) ==
State Route 229
- Location: Tiffin–Republic
- Existed: 1925–1926

SR 229 was a short state route near the location of the 1923 routing of SR 229. Located in central Seneca County, the route connected Tiffin and Republic. Formerly a part of SR 106 until 1925, the route was fully asphalt-paved by 1926. By 1927, the entire route became a part of SR 18.

== SR 229 (1927–1929) ==
State Route 229
- Location: Bellevue–Strongs Ridge
- Existed: 1927–1929

SR 229 was the third short-lived state highway with this number in north-central Ohio. This incarnation of the designation ran from eastern Bellevue to the community of Strongs Ridge at SR 4 (within Lyme Township). The route existed from 1927 until 1929 when it was replaced by SR 59.

== SR 230 (1923–1957) ==
State Route 230
- Location: Fremont
- Length: 0.5 mi (800 m)
- Existed: 1923–1957

SR 230 was a short connector route on the western side of Fremont. At a length of 1/2 mile (0.80 km), the route connected SR 19 and US 6. The route existed from 1923 until 1957 when all state highways in the vicinity of Fremont were moved outside of the city.

Major intersections

The entire route was in Fremont, Sandusky County.

mi	km	Destinations	Notes
0.0	0.0	SR 12 (Buckland Avenue)	
0.5	0.80	US 6 / SR 19 (Hayes Avenue)	
1.000 mi = 1.609 km; 1.000 km = 0.621 mi

== SR 230 (1962–1971) ==
State Route 230
- Location: Perrysburg
- Length: 0.23 mi (370 m)
- Existed: 1962–1971

SR 230 was the successor of SR 270 when it was renumbered due to the creation of I-270. The entire route was located in Perrysburg mostly within the area of the Fort Meigs State Memorial. At a length of 0.23 miles (0.37 km), it was one of the shortest state highways in Ohio. The route connected SR 65 on the north side of the Fort to the foot of the Maumee-Perrysburg Bridge along US 20, US 23, and US 25. Around 1971, restoration of the Fort Meigs site resulted in the rerouting of SR 65 south of the park; this relocation also caused the abandonment of some parts of SR 230; the route was removed from the state highway system as a result of this. What remains of the route is now called Rapids Road.

Major intersections

The entire route was in Perrysburg, Wood County.

mi	km	Destinations	Notes
0.0	0.0	SR 65 (Front Street)	
0.23	0.37	US 20 / US 25 (Maumee-Western Reserve Road)	
1.000 mi = 1.609 km; 1.000 km = 0.621 mi

Browse numbered routes
← SR 229	OH	→ SR 231

== SR 232 (1923–1928) ==
State Route 232
- Location: Berea–Kamms
- Existed: 1923–1928

SR 232 was a state route in Cuyahoga County that existed from 1923 until 1928. The route started at SR 3 (later US 42) east of Berea, traveled west into Berea, and headed north into Brook Park and ended in the Cleveland neighborhood of Kamms. In 1929, the route was removed from the state highway system but parts were added back to the system in 1935 as SR 237.

== SR 234 (1924–1929) ==
State Route 234
- Location: West Lafayette–Shanesville
- Existed: 1924–1929

SR 234 was a section of modern-day SR 93 that existed between 1924 and 1929. The route throughout its history ran between West Lafayette and Shanesville and also passed through Baltic. SR 234 was deleted by 1930 when SR 93 was extended south from its former terminus in Brewster.

== SR 234 (1930–1937) ==
State Route 234
- Location: Warsaw–Shreve
- Existed: 1930–1937

SR 234 was a state highway in Coshocton and Holmes Counties. The route when it was created in 1930 ran from SR 95 (later US 36 east of Warsaw to Killbuck at SR 19 (later US 62) paralleling the Killbuck Creek for its entire length. In 1932, the route was extended north of Killbuck to act as a connector from US 62 to the village of Glenmont. For the last year of its existence, the spur of SR 234 to Glenmont was removed and instead, SR 234 was routed on roads into northern Holmes County to end at SR 514 southwest of Shreve. The former route to Glenmont became SR 520. The entire route from US 36 to SR 514 became a part of the extended SR 77 by 1938.

== SR 237 (1924–1932) ==
State Route 237
- Location: Buckeye Lake–Hebron
- Existed: 1924–1932

SR 237 was a state route entirely in Licking County in existence from 1924 until 1932. At a length of about 1 1/2 miles (2.4 km), the route connected the villages of Buckeye Lake and Hebron. The route was removed after 1932 and is currently a part of SR 79.

== SR 238 ==
State Route 238
- Location: Union Township–Bloomington
- Length: 1.04 mi (1.67 km)
- Existed: 1924–2014

SR 238 was a short 1.04-mile-long (1.67 km) connector between US 62 and SR 3 in Union Township and SR 38 in Bloomingburg, entirely in Fayette County. It was created in 1924 and remained unchanged until 2014. In that year, the portion of SR 38 south of Bloomingburg was turned over to county control; SR 38's southern terminus was then moved to the former intersection of SR 238 and US 62/SR 3 taking over SR 238 in its entirety.

== SR 240 (1924–1938) ==
State Route 240
- Location: Lucasville
- Existed: 1924–1938

SR 240 was a state route in the Scioto River valley near Lucasville. The route existed from 1924 until 1938 and always consisted as a connector between SR 104 (from 1924 until 1926, also presently) or SR 112 (after 1927) and U.S. Route 23 in Ohio in Lucasville via a bridge over the river. The route became a part of SR 348 in 1939 though this specific bridge has since been removed.

== SR 240 (1948–1967) ==
State Route 240
- Location: East Harbor State Park
- Existed: 1948–1967

SR 240 was a spur from SR 163 to the entrance to East Harbor State Park near Marblehead. The state highway was created in 1948 along an unnumbered road and deleted after 1967 when SR 269 was extended north to the park's entrance.

== SR 242 ==
State Route 242
- Location: Richland Township–Wayne Township
- Length: 3.67 mi (5.91 km)
- Existed: 1924–2013

SR 242 was a 3.67-mile-long (5.91 km) route near Versailles, Darke County. Signed in 1924, the route connected US 127 and SR 121 to the Darke County Airport. The route would remain unchanged until 2013 when after a proposal to extend a runway at the airport which would require the closing of a portion of the route, the Ohio Department of Transportation decided to abandon the entire route. The route is now Darke County Route 242 and township roads.

== SR 244 ==
State Route 244
- Location: Newport
- Existed: 1925–1961

SR 244 was an L-shaped state route that existed from 1925 until 1961 and passed through the community of Newport, Washington County. The route is a former section of SR 7; SR 244 was created when SR 7 was routed on an alignment closer to the Ohio River. In 1961, the route was removed from the state highway system having been replaced by two county roads: CR 25 (Greene Street) is the former north-south section and CR 244 (Dana Road) is the former east-west portion.

Browse numbered routes
← SR 243	OH	→ SR 245

== SR 245 (1925–1934) ==
State Route 245
- Location: Bloomfield–Matamoras
- Existed: 1925–1934

SR 245 was the designation for what is now SR 260 between the community of Bloomfield (within Ludlow Township) and Matamoras. The route was in existence from 1925 until 1934 and traveled between SR 26 and SR 7. SR 245 was deleted when SR 260 was extended on a previously-unnumbered road from Marr to Matamoras.

== SR 249 (1925–1926) ==
State Route 249
- Location: Ney
- Existed: 1925–1926

SR 249 was a short route that provided a more direct route along SR 9 between Sherwood and Bryan. The route existed for two years in 1925 and 1926 and existed in the vicinity of Ney. After 1926, SR 9 was moved onto SR 249 and the route number was reused on the former SR 22 between Indiana and Ney.

== SR 250 (1925–1928) ==
State Route 250
- Location: Lakeville–Burnetts Corners
- Existed: 1925–1928

SR 250 was a state route in Holmes and Wayne Counties. During the route's first two years in existence starting in 1925, SR 250 started at the intersection of SR 3 and SR 179 near Lakeville and traveled northwest to Burnetts Corners, southwest of Wooster. For the next two years, SR 3 was moved onto this direct alignment and SR 250 was routed onto SR 3's former alignment. The end points of SR 250 remained the same, but SR 250 traveled east towards Shreve and traveled north to SR 3. In 1929, SR 250 was renumbered to SR 226 as US 250 was created in the state.

== SR 253 (1925–1957) ==
State Route 253
- Location: Mallet Creek–Weymouth
- Existed: 1925–1957

SR 253 was a state highway entirely in Medina County. The route's western terminus had always been at Routes 18 and 57 near Mallet Creek. From 1925 until 1936, the route was a three-mile-long (4.8 km) connector from Mallet Creek to US 42 (originally SR 3) in Medina Township. Afterwards from this point until the route's deletion in 1957, SR 253 was extended further east to SR 3 near Weymouth. Today, the entire route is now Medina County Road 70.

== SR 255 (1926) ==
State Route 255
- Location: Ada–Mount Cory
- Existed: 1926–1926

SR 255 was a state highway that existed for one year, 1926, and ran between Ada and Mount Cory. The route started at SR 69 in Ada and traveled due north past SR 3 and SR 103 before it ended at SR 6 in Mount Cory. After 1926, SR 69 was routed north along the entire route of SR 255.

== SR 255 (1927–1932) ==
State Route 255
- Location: New Philadelphia–Reeds Run
- Existed: 1927–1932

SR 255 was a state highway in Tuscarawas County. The route replaced part of SR 259 in 1927 and ran from downtown New Philadelphia and ran north to SR 8 near Reeds Run. By 1933, the entire route was deleted and the road on which it ran became a northern extension of SR 16.

== SR 256 (1926) ==
State Route 256
- Location: Toledo
- Existed: 1926–1926

SR 256 was the state-numbered route for Lewis Avenue north of the city limits of Toledo. The route was created along a previously-unnumbered road in 1926 and was replaced within one year by US 23.

== SR 262 ==
State Route 262
- Location: Osceola–Melmore
- Existed: 1926–1967

SR 262 was a state route in western Crawford County. Throughout its nearly 40 years in existence, the route always traveled from the community of Osceola at US 30N to Texas Township, just south of the Seneca County line at SR 100. SR 262 was first signed in 1926 and was removed from the state system after 1967. Today, the entirety of the former state highway is now Crawford County Road 1.

Browse numbered routes
← SR 261	OH	→ SR 263

== SR 263 (1926) ==
State Route 263
- Location: East Liverpool–East Palestine
- Existed: 1926–1926

SR 263 was a short-lived predecessor to SR 170 between East Liverpool and East Palestine. The route was created in 1926 but was resigned as an extension of SR 170 within one year of its designation.

== SR 263 (1926–1939) ==
State Route 263
- Location: Sylvania–Toledo
- Existed: 1927–1939

SR 263 was a highway from US 223 in Toledo west and north to US 223 in Sylvania. The route was designated in 1926 as a renumbering of part of SR 23 from Toledo to west of Toledo and part of SR 63 (which the remainder was replaced by US 20 and US 23) from west of Toledo to Sylvania. SR 263 was cancelled in 1939 and was replaced by SR 120. However, the section of SR 120 from Sylvania south was renumbered as SR 333 in 1946, but was decommissioned in 1962. This section is now Holland-Sylvania Road.

== SR 265 (1926) ==
State Route 265
- Location: Beverly–Reinersville
- Existed: 1926–1926

SR 265 was the predecessor to a section of SR 76 that existed in 1926. The route ran from SR 37 north of Beverly to SR 78 just outside Reinersville. Within one year, the entire route became a part of a southern extension of SR 76.

== SR 268 ==
State Route 268
- Location: Bridgetown–Cheviot
- Existed: 1928–1975

SR 268 was a 0.7-mile-long (1.1 km) state route between Bridgetown and Cheviot following Bridgetown Road. The route, created in 1928, existed until 1975 when the entire road was turned over to county and local control.

Browse numbered routes
← SR 267	OH	→ SR 269

== SR 270 (1928–1962) ==
State Route 270
- Location: Perrysburg
- Length: 0.23 mi (370 m)
- Existed: 1928–1962

SR 270 was a short state highway in the vicinity of Fort Meigs in Perrysburg. The 0.23-mile-long (0.37 km) route was one of the shortest routes in the state and connected SR 65 with the foot of the Maumee-Perrysburg Bridge along US 20, US 23, and US 25. In 1962, due to the construction of I-270 around Columbus, SR 270 was renumbered to SR 230.

Browse numbered routes
← I-270	OH	→ I-271
