= Ohio State Route 514 =

State highway in central Ohio, US

State Route 514

Route information
- Maintained by ODOT
- Length: 19.89 mi (32.01 km)
- Existed: 1937–present

Major junctions
- South end: US 62 / SR 205 in Danville
- SR 39 / SR 60 in Nashville
- North end: SR 226 near Shreve

Location
- Country: United States
- State: Ohio
- Counties: Knox, Holmes

Highway system
- Ohio State Highway System; Interstate; US; State; Scenic
← SR 513	→ SR 515

State Route 514 (SR 514) is a state highway in Knox and Holmes Counties in central Ohio. 19.89 miles (32.01 km) long, it connects US 62 and the southern terminus of SR 205 in Danville to SR 226 in the community of Centerville just south of Shreve.

== Route description ==
SR 514 begins at the intersection of Main and Market Streets in the center of Danville. From this point, US 62 heads south on Market Street and east on Main Street. Heading north from here, SR 514 is also co-signed with SR 205. The two routes begin at the same place and run together north for about 0.25 miles (0.40 km) before SR 205 breaks off and heads northwest. SR 514 heads northeast through rolling terrain of northeastern Knox County. The route enters the small community of Greer and crosses the Mohican River. It then enters Holmes County and travels through similar terrain as it did in Knox County. Shortly after entering Holmes County, SR 514 reaches the western terminus of SR 520 at an unsignalized T-intersection. Past this point, it enters the village of Nashville intersecting SR 39 and SR 60 in the center of town and at the peak of a hill. Exiting the town, SR 514 continues northeast reaching the northern terminus of SR 754. Shortly after this point, SR 514 reaches its northern terminus at SR 226 in the community of Centerville. The four-way stop-controlled intersection lies on the border of Holmes and Wayne Counties.

The entire route passes through farmlands and occasional single-family homes except within towns where SR 514 is in a mix of residential and small commercial districts. No part of the highway is included within the National Highway System.

== History ==
SR 514 was designated on its present Danville–Shreve alignment in 1936. At the time of its designation, the entire route was paved with gravel. By 1955, its entire length was asphalt-paved. Since then, no changes have occurred to the routing.

== Major intersections ==
County	Location	mi	km	Destinations	Notes
Knox	Danville	0.00	0.00	US 62 (Main Street / South Market Street) / SR 205 ends	Southern end of SR 205 concurrency
Knox	Union Township	0.26	0.42	SR 205 north (Danville-Jelloway Road)	Northern end of SR 205 concurrency
Holmes	Knox Township	9.34	15.03	SR 520 east – Killbuck	Western terminus of SR 520
Holmes	Nashville	13.57	21.84	SR 39 / SR 60 (Millersburg Street)	
Holmes	Ripley Township	18.81	30.27	SR 754 south / CR 51	Northern terminus of SR 754
Holmes–Wayne county line	Ripley–Clinton township line	19.89	32.01	SR 226 (Shreve Road) / CR 1 (Centerville Road)	
1.000 mi = 1.609 km; 1.000 km = 0.621 mi: Concurrency terminus
