= Ohio State Route 226 =

State highway in central Ohio, US

State Route 226

Route information
- Maintained by ODOT
- Length: 14.83 mi (23.87 km)
- Existed: 1929–present

Major junctions
- West end: SR 3 / SR 179 near Lakeville
- North end: SR 3 near Wooster

Location
- Country: United States
- State: Ohio
- Counties: Holmes, Wayne

Highway system
- Ohio State Highway System; Interstate; US; State; Scenic
← SR 225	→ SR 227
← US 250	→ SR 251

State Route 226 (SR 226) is a northeast–southwest state highway in the central part of the U.S. state of Ohio. The highway's western terminus is at the junction of State Route 3 and State Route 179 approximately 4.50 miles (7.24 km) northeast of Loudonville. Its northern terminus is also at Ohio State Route 3, this time at an intersection nearly 1.75 miles (2.82 km) southwest of Wooster.

== Route description ==
State Route 226 travels through the northwestern portion of Holmes County and the southwestern quadrant of Wayne County. There is no segment of State Route 226 that is incorporated within the National Highway System. For the whole route, the road stays as a two-lane road.

== History ==
State Route 226 was established in 1929. It was routed along the alignment that it maintains to this day, replacing what was designated as State Route 250. This was due to the designation of U.S. Route 250 in the state of Ohio in that same year. No changes of major significance have taken place to State Route 226 since its inception.

== Major intersections ==
County	Location	mi	km	Destinations	Notes
Holmes	Washington Township	0.00	0.00	SR 3 / SR 179 north – Loudonville	Western end of SR 179 concurrency
Holmes	Washington Township	0.97	1.56	SR 179 south – Nashville	Eastern end of SR 179 concurrency
Wayne	No major junctions				
Holmes–Wayne county line	Ripley–Clinton township line	6.47	10.41	SR 514 south / CR 1 (Centerville Road) – Nashville	Northern terminus of SR 514
Wayne	Wooster Township	14.83	23.87	SR 3 – Wooster	
1.000 mi = 1.609 km; 1.000 km = 0.621 mi: Concurrency terminus
