= Ohio State Route 754 =

State highway in Holmes County, Ohio, US

State Route 754

Route information
- Maintained by ODOT
- Length: 6.73 mi (10.83 km)
- Existed: 1962–present

Major junctions
- South end: SR 39 / SR 60 near Millersburg
- North end: SR 514 near Shreve

Location
- Country: United States
- State: Ohio
- Counties: Holmes

Highway system
- Ohio State Highway System; Interstate; US; State; Scenic
← SR 753	→ SR 756

State Route 754 (SR 754) is a two-lane north–south state highway that runs within Holmes County, Ohio. The southern terminus of SR 754 is at the intersection that marks the eastern split of the concurrency of SR 39 and SR 60 approximately 5.5 miles (8.9 km) northwest of Millersburg. Its northern terminus is at SR 514 about 2 miles (3.2 km) southwest of Shreve.

== Route description ==
All of SR 754 is located within the north central portion of Holmes County, although its northern terminus is within 1 mile (1.6 km) of the Holmes-Wayne county line. The state highway is not inclusive within the National Highway System, a system of routes determined to be most important for the nation's economy, mobility and defense.

== History ==
SR 754 came into being in 1962 along its current alignment, replacing what was previously designated as a portion of SR 77 prior to the designation of I-77 in Ohio. The current route has been a part of the state highway system since 1937 when it was the northernmost section of SR 234. Within one year, the route had been redesignated SR 77. By 1953, the entire route had been paved after being a gravel road since its inclusion within the system. Except for its renumbering, no major changes have taken place to the routing of SR 754 since its inception.

== Major intersections ==
The entire route is in Holmes County.

Location	mi	km	Destinations	Notes
Monroe Township	0.00	0.00	SR 39 / SR 60 – Millersburg, Killbuck, Loudonville	
Ripley Township	6.73	10.83	SR 514 / CR 51	
1.000 mi = 1.609 km; 1.000 km = 0.621 mi
