= Clell Lee Metcalf =

American entomologist (1888–1948)

- Born: March 25, 1888; Lakeville
- Died: August 21, 1948 (aged 60)
- Education: Ohio State University, Harvard University
- Occupation: entomologist
- Notable work: Destructive and Useful Insects

Clell Lee Metcalf (March 25, 1888 – August 21, 1948) was an American entomologist who specialised in Diptera. He worked on treatises on the Syrphidae of Maine and, along with Wesley Pillsbury Flint (1883–1943), wrote Destructive and useful insects; their habits and control, a major work on insect pests, while he taught at the University of Illinois.

Metcalf was born in Lakeville Ohio, the seventh son of Abel Crawford and Catherine Fulmer Metcalf. He studied at Springfield and went to high school in Wooster, Ohio. He graduated from Ohio State University with a bachelor's degree in 1911 and a masters in 1912. With a George Emerson scholarship he moved to Harvard University and obtained a doctorate in 1919. He studied blood-sucking flies in the Adirondack Mountains and taught entomology at the University of Illinois from 1921 to 1947. He married Cleo Esther Fouch in 1908 and his son Robert L. Metcalf became an entomologist while his brother Zeno Payne Metcalf was a systematic entomologist. His major works in entomology were on insect control. His most famous work was Destructive and Useful Insects (1928) coauthored with W.P. Flint.

Metcalf was elected in 1920 a fellow of the Entomological Society of America.
