= Ohio State Route 179 =

State highway in central Ohio, US

State Route 179

Route information
- Maintained by ODOT
- Length: 15.52 mi (24.98 km)
- Existed: 1923–present

Major junctions
- South end: SR 39 / SR 60 near Nashville
- SR 3 / SR 226 in Washington Township
- North end: SR 60 / CR 30A in Hayesville

Location
- Country: United States
- State: Ohio
- Counties: Holmes, Ashland

Highway system
- Ohio State Highway System; Interstate; US; State; Scenic
← SR 178	→ SR 180

State Route 179 (SR 179) is a 15.52-mile (24.98 km) long north–south state highway in the central portion of the U.S. state of Ohio. SR 179 runs from its southern terminus at the duplex of SR 39 and SR 60 nearly 0.50 miles (0.80 km) northwest of the limits of the village of Nashville to its northern terminus at a signalized intersection with SR 60 in Hayesville.

== Route description ==
SR 179 traverses the northwestern portion of Holmes County and the southeastern quadrant of Ashland County. No part of this state highway is included within the National Highway System (NHS). The NHS is a system of routes that are identified as being most important for the economy, mobility and defense of the country.

== History ==
SR 179 was assigned in 1923. This highway has maintained the same routing between SR 39 near Nashville and SR 60 in Hayesville for its entire lifetime.

== Major intersections ==
County	Location	mi	km	Destinations	Notes
Holmes	Washington Township	0.00	0.00	SR 39 / SR 60 – Loudonville, Millersburg	
Holmes	Washington Township	4.01	6.45	SR 226 east – Shreve	Southern end of SR 226 concurrency
Holmes	Washington Township	4.98	8.01	SR 3 / SR 226 ends – Loudonville, Wooster	Western terminus of SR 226 and northern end of concurrency
Ashland	Mohican Township	10.31	16.59	SR 95 – Perrysville	
Ashland	Hayesville	15.52	24.98	SR 60 (Mechanic Street) / CR 30A (Main Street) – Loudonville, Ashland	
1.000 mi = 1.609 km; 1.000 km = 0.621 mi: Concurrency terminus
