= Ohio State Route 520 =

State highway in Holmes County, Ohio, US

State Route 520

Route information
- Maintained by ODOT
- Length: 13.52 mi (21.76 km)
- Existed: 1937–present

Major junctions
- West end: SR 514 near Nashville
- East end: US 62 near Killbuck

Location
- Country: United States
- State: Ohio
- Counties: Holmes

Highway system
- Ohio State Highway System; Interstate; US; State; Scenic
| ← SR 519 | → SR 521 |

State Route 520 (SR 520) is an east–west state highway in the central part of Ohio. SR 520's western terminus is at a T-intersection with SR 514 about 4 miles (6.4 km) southwest of Nashville. The highway's eastern terminus is also at a T-intersection, this time with US 62 just 0.5 miles (0.80 km) southwest of the village Killbuck and US 62's junction with SR 60. SR 520 provides access to the village of Glenmont.

== Route description ==
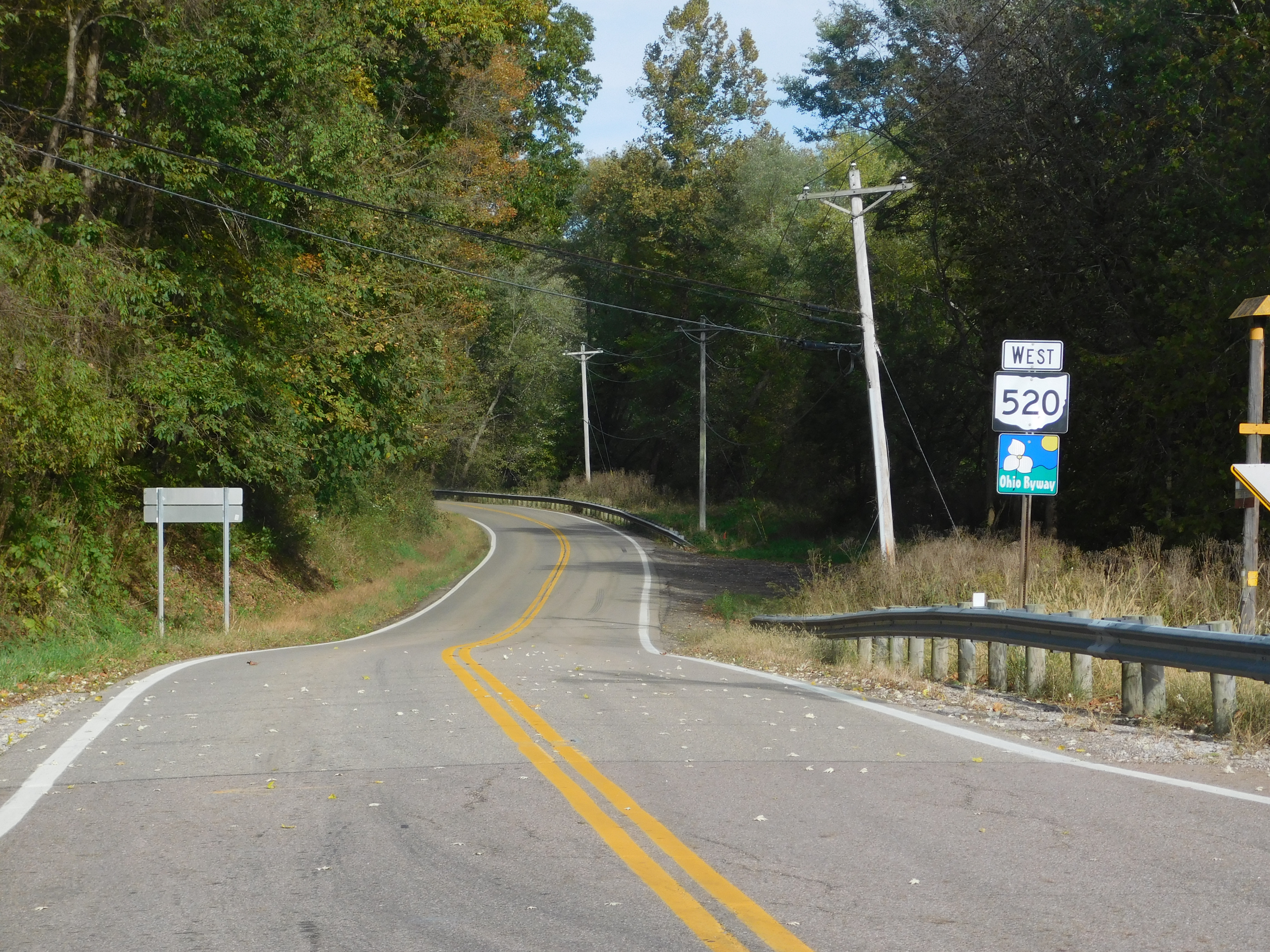
OH 520 in Killbuck from US 62

State Route 520 runs exclusively within the southwestern quadrant of Holmes County. The highway is not a part of the National Highway System, a network of highways classified as the most important to the nation's economy, mobility and defense.

== History ==
Established in 1937 along the path that it currently maintains within Holmes County between State Route 514 and U.S. Route 62, State Route 520 has not experienced any major changes to its routing throughout its history.

== Major intersections ==
The entire route is in Holmes County.

| Location | mi | km | Destinations | Notes |
|---|---|---|---|---|
| Knox Township | 0.00 | 0.00 | SR 514 – Nashville, Danville | |
| Killbuck Township | 13.52 | 21.76 | US 62 – Millersburg, Brinkhaven | |
1.000 mi = 1.609 km; 1.000 km = 0.621 mi
