= Robert C. and Bettie J. (Sponseller) Metcalf House =

- U.S. National Register of Historic Places
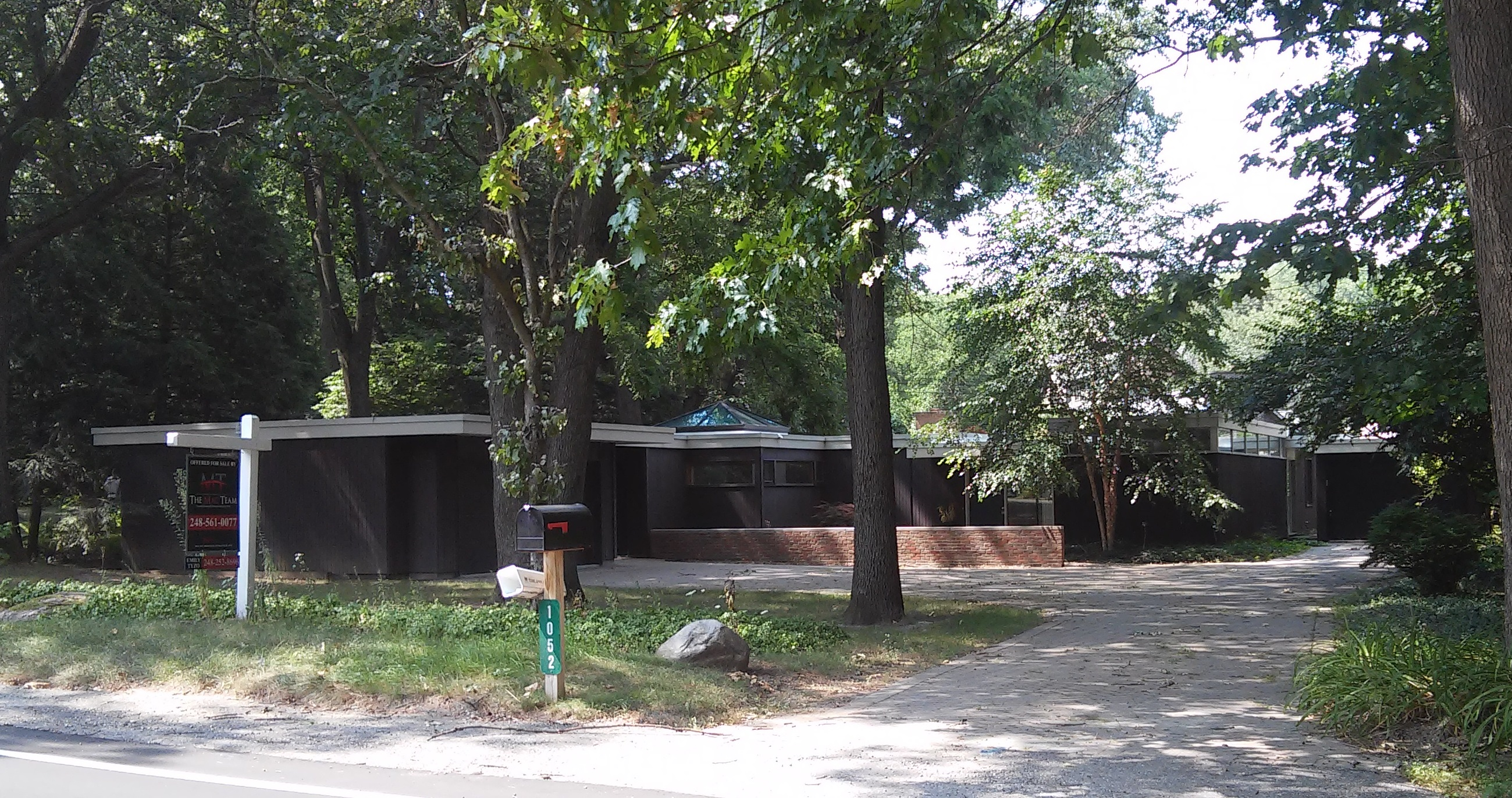
- Interactive map
- Location: 1052 Arlington Blvd; Ann Arbor, Michigan
- Coordinates: 42°16′8″N 83°42′31″W
- Built: 1952
- Built by: Bettie and Robert Metcalf
- Architect: Robert C. Metcalf
- Architectural style: International Style
- NRHP reference No.: 16000910
- Added to NRHP: December 27, 2016

The Robert C. and Bettie J. (Sponseller) Metcalf House is a single-family home located at 1052 Arlington Boulevard in Ann Arbor, Michigan. The International Style house, designed, constructed, and occupied for decades by Robert and Bettie Metcalf, is the first example of Robert Metcalf's designs in the broader mid-century modern style.

The Metcalf House was listed on the National Register of Historic Places in 2016, and is currently a private residence.

== Biography ==
Robert Clarence Metcalf was born in Nashville, Ohio in 1923. His family moved to Canton, Ohio and then the nearby North Industry, where Metcalf graduated from high school. Determined to be an architect, he went on to the University of Michigan, starting classes in 1941. World War II interrupted, however, and Metcalf enlisted in the United States Army in 1943. He was promoted to Staff Sergeant and eventually commissioned in 1945, receiving a Silver Star the same year. After returning home in 1946, Metcalf resumed his studies and began working for his mentor, George B. Brigham.

Bettie Jane Sponseller was born in Canton, Ohio in 1921. Sponseller met Metcalf in high school, and later studied at the Aultman Hospital School of Nursing, graduating in 1942. Sponseller and Metcalf married in May 1943. Following the conclusion of Robert's studies in 1950, the couple decided to stay in Ann Arbor, and Robert set out to open his own architecture practice.

To establish his architecture practice, Robert Metcalf decided to design and build his own house. His outlook for the architecture practice was positive, as his mentor's designs were popular with university faculty. Postwar population growth in Ann Arbor had resulted in a shortage of housing, and financing for experimental projects was readily available from a local savings and loan association, which in Metcalf's words was "willing to loan money on what many people considered chicken coops." Metcalf's practice, based in the house's garage, won its first commission while their residence was still under construction, and was soon busy enough that he hired assistants. Bettie left her nursing career to manage the firm, which in 1967 moved from a rented office to a building designed by Metcalf on Medford Road.

Robert Metcalf joined the University of Michigan's department of architecture in 1955, became chair of the department in 1968, and dean of the new College of Architecture and Urban Planning in 1974. The firm's work totaled over 150 projects in Michigan and Ohio, including 68 houses in Ann Arbor, from its first commission in 1953 to its closure in 2008.

Bettie J. Metcalf died in February 2008, and Robert died in January 2017.

== Design and construction ==
By 1950, Robert and Bettie Metcalf were tired of Ann Arbor apartment living, and the couple sought to build a house for themselves. Bettie searched for a parcel of land to build on, initially favoring then-inexpensive parcels on the west side of Ann Arbor. The available properties were still out of the Metcalfs' reach, and Bettie eventually located a 1/2-acre (0.20 ha) parcel on Arlington Boulevard, then east of the Ann Arbor city limits, for $1,100, equivalent to $11,000 in 2024.

With land secured, Robert Metcalf began design work on the house. As his first major architectural work, Metcalf spent over 800 hours on the design process for the house, seeking to prove to himself that he could account for the entire workflow of a construction project. The Metcalfs, neither of whom had a background in construction, planned to construct the house with as much of their own labor as possible, and chose materials and designs accordingly. The design emphasized a connection with nature, with large southeast-facing windows that also supported a passive solar design. The original designs specified a rain garden in the backyard, capturing runoff from the house's flat roof.

Another major consideration in the design was energy efficiency. Underfloor radiant heating provides climate control, underlaying Chicago common brick floors. The design uses few interior doors, which supports the aesthetic principles of the International Style design, and also allows for passive cooling in the summer. Design work for the house, which also specified the furnishings, took approximately one year before construction began in April 1952.

Bettie and Robert Metcalf performed much of the construction work themselves. The couple built the house during evenings and weekends, after their day jobs, and held picnics at the worksite regardless of the season. By the time the house was finished in May 1953, the architecture practice had its first commission, and four more commissions followed by the end of that year.

The interior of the house was expanded in 1972 and 1987, and a new 2-car garage was built in 2010. These additions increased the house's interior area from 1,080 sq ft (100 m^{2}) to over 2,200 sq ft (200 m^{2}).

== Description ==
The Robert and Bettie Metcalf House is a one-story, flat-roof, International Style house constructed of wood, steel and concrete. The exterior is clad in glass curtain walls and vertical cedar wood siding. It is a rectilinear structure of approximately 2,600 square feet (240 m^{2}), resting on cinder block walls and reinforced concrete footings.

The main facade exhibits alternating roof heights, forming three masses: a roof above the entry and the garage at one elevation, and the roof above the living area at a higher elevation. Clerestory ribbon windows here separate the wall plane from the roof, creating the effect of a floating roof. The dark cedar wood of the walls contrasts with the white of the roof planes. A flush front door flanked by a floor-to-ceiling sidelight is covered by a roof extension, supported by columns, for protection.

The interior is generally open plan, with the public areas defined by partitions and built-in furnishings. It has a living/dining area, kitchen, study, and two bedrooms.
