= Brown's Lake Bog =

Nature preserve in Wayne County, Ohio, United States

Brown's Lake Bog Preserve
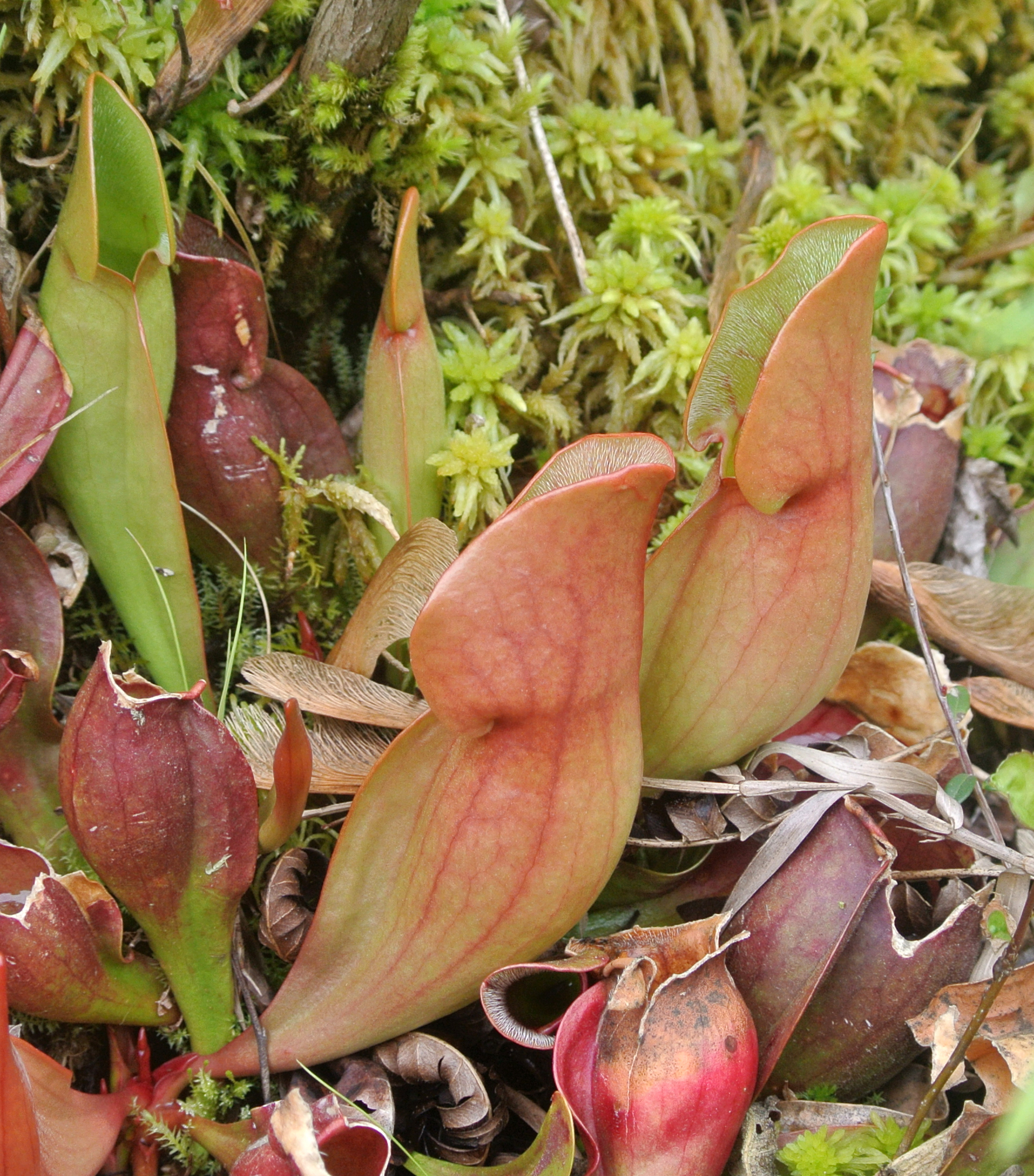
- Sarracenia purpurea at Brown's Lake Bog

- Location within Ohio Location within the United States
- Location: Wayne County, Ohio, USA
- Nearest city: Shreve
- Coordinates: 40.6809°N 82.0624°W
- Area: 99 acres (40 ha)
- Established: 1966
- Governing body: Nature Conservancy
- Website: Official website

U.S. National Natural Landmark
- Designated: 1967

Brown's Lake Bog is a dedicated Ohio state nature preserve owned by The Nature Conservancy. It is one of the few remaining kettle peatlands in the U.S. state of Ohio. It has a kettle lake, kame, and a floating sphagnum moss mat. Public visitation is allowed.

It is located in southwestern Wayne County near the village of Shreve. It was designated a National Natural Landmark in 1967.
