= Ohio State Route 205 =

State highway in Knox County, Ohio, US

State Route 205

Route information
- Maintained by O.D.O.T.
- Length: 6.94 mi (11.17 km)
- Existed: 1924–present

Major junctions
- South end: US 62 in Danville
- North end: SR 3 near Loudonville

Location
- Country: United States
- State: Ohio
- Counties: Knox

Highway system
- Ohio State Highway System; Interstate; US; State; Scenic
← SR 204	→ SR 206

State Route 205 (SR 205) is a north–south state highway in the central part of the U.S. state of Ohio. The southern terminus of SR 205 is at a four-way stop intersection in the village of Danville where it meets U.S. Route 62 (US 62). The junction also doubles as the southern terminus of SR 514, which runs concurrently with SR 205 for approximately one-quarter mile (0.40 km) heading north from there. SR 205's northern terminus is at a T-intersection with SR 3 nearly six and a half miles (10.5 km) southwest of Loudonville.

== Route description ==
Located entirely within the northeastern quadrant of Knox County, there is no portion of SR 205 that is inclusive within the National Highway System.

== History ==
SR 205 was established in 1924. It has maintained the same northeastern Knox County alignment from its inception to this day.; no major changes have taken place to the highway since its designation.

== Major intersections ==
The entire route is in Knox County.

Location	mi	km	Destinations	Notes
Danville	0.00	0.00	US 62 (South Market Street / Main Street)	Southern terminus of SR 205 and SR 514
Union Township	0.26	0.42	SR 514 north (Nashville Road)	Northern end of SR 514 concurrency
Brown Township	6.94	11.17	SR 3 (Wooster Road)	
1.000 mi = 1.609 km; 1.000 km = 0.621 mi: Concurrency terminus
