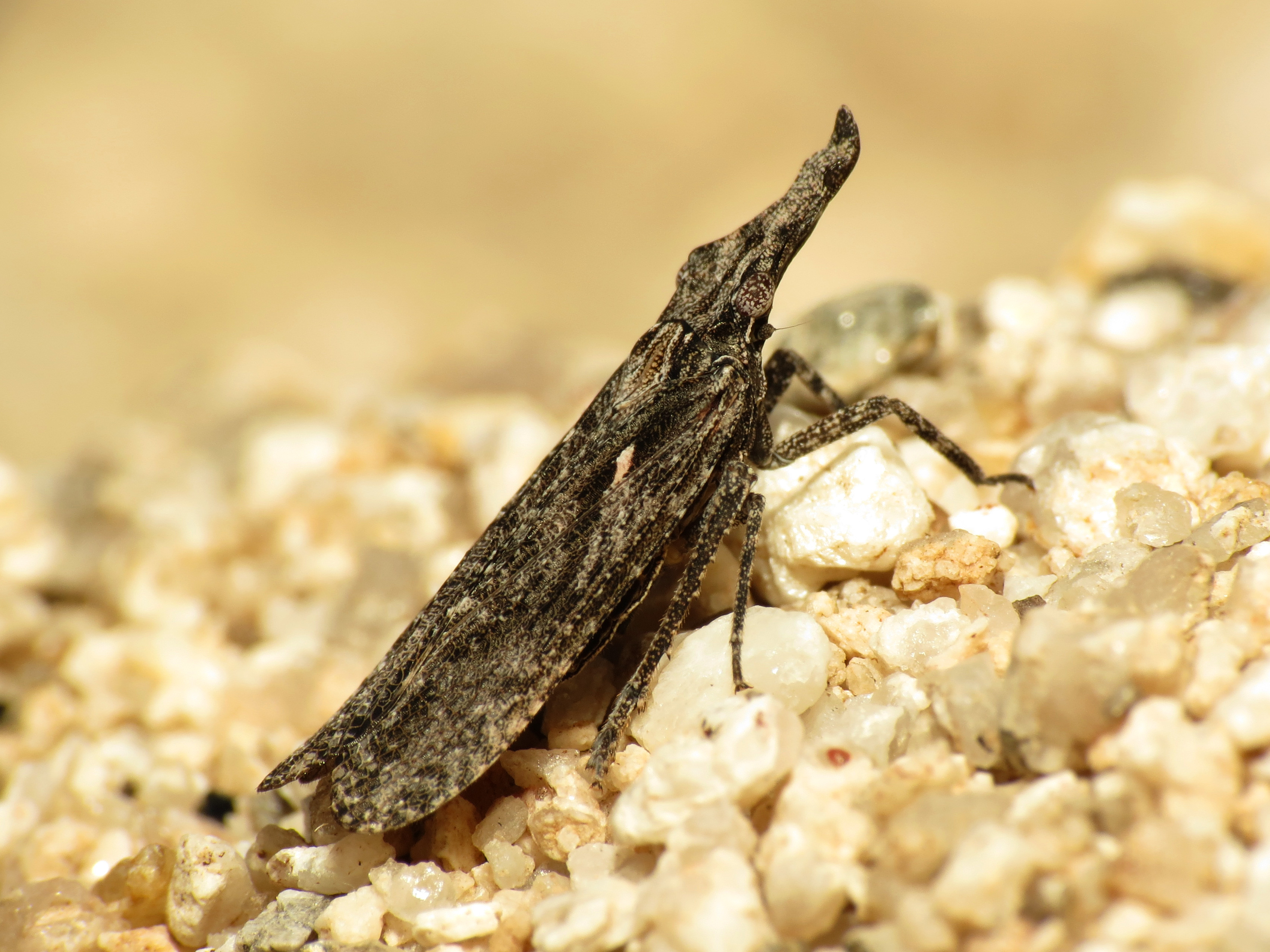
- Amycle tumacacoriae

Scientific classification
- Domain: Eukaryota
- Kingdom: Animalia
- Phylum: Arthropoda
- Class: Insecta
- Order: Hemiptera
- Suborder: Auchenorrhyncha
- Infraorder: Fulgoromorpha
- Superfamily: Fulgoroidea
- Family: Fulgoridae
- Subfamily: Amyclinae; Metcalf, 1938

= Amyclinae =

Subfamily of true bugs

The Amyclinae are a subfamily of planthoppers in the Auchenorrhyncha, whose Basionym was first used by Zeno Payne Metcalf in 1938. The recorded distribution is the Americas, Africa, Malesia and Australia.

== Genera ==
The subfamily contains a single tribe – the Amyclini – which currently (2022) contains 18 species in the following genera:

1. Alcathous Stål, 1863
2. Amycle Stål, 1861
3. Druentia Stål, 1866
4. Pseudoamycle Campodonico & Fierro, 2019
5. Rhabdocephala Van Duzee, 1929
6. Samsama Distant, 1906 (Peninsular Malaysia, Sumatra: 1 sp. S. chersonesia)
7. Scolopsella Ball, 1905
