= Megachile zombae =

Scientific classification
- Kingdom: Animalia
- Phylum: Arthropoda
- Clade: Pancrustacea
- Class: Insecta
- Order: Hymenoptera
- Family: Megachilidae
- Genus: Megachile
- Species: M. zombae

Binomial name
- Megachile zombae Schulten, 1977

Species of bee

Megachile zombae is a species of bee in the Megachilidae family. Natively endemic to Malawi and identified in 1977, these are solitary bees. The name derives from Greek mega (μεγας) 'large' + cheil- (χειλ) 'lip' (referring to the mouthparts of the bee) and a district Zomba, in Malawi.

== Leafcutter bees ==
Solitary bees, such as leafcutters, do not form colonies. Unlike social insects (ants, yellow jackets, honeybees), leafcutters work alone building isolated nests. Similar to honeybees, female bees perform nearly all essential tasks of brood rearing. These insects perform essential tasks, pollinating wild plants. The alfalfa leaf cutter bee (Megachile rotundata), native to Europe, has been semi-domesticated for crop pollination. In North America, the species was deliberately imported to assist in the pollination of food crops, but has now become feral and widespread.

== Taxonomy and naming ==
The genus Megachile is a cosmopolitan group of solitary bees, often called leafcutter bees. While other genera within the family Megachilidae may chew leaves or petals into fragments to build their nests. Certain species within Megachile neatly cut pieces of leaves or petals, hence their common name. The genus Megachile is one of the largest genera of bees, with over 1500 species.

== Morphology and identification ==
Detailed physical descriptions of M. campanulae campanulae and M. campanulae wilmingtoni were published in Theodore B. Mitchell's work Bees of the Eastern United States. However, M. zombae was not described, having been discovered several years later.

== See also ==
- List of Megachile species
