= Ohio State Route 270 =

State Route 270

Route information
- Maintained by ODOT

Location
- Country: United States
- State: Ohio

Highway system
- Ohio State Highway System; Interstate; US; State; Scenic
← I-270	→ I-271

In Ohio, State Route 270 may refer to:

- Interstate 270 in Ohio, the only Ohio highway numbered 270 since about 1962
- Ohio State Route 270 (1928-1962), a short route near Perrysburg
