= Big Prairie, Ohio =

Unincorporated community in Ohio, U.S.

Coordinates: 40°40′02″N 82°05′43″W

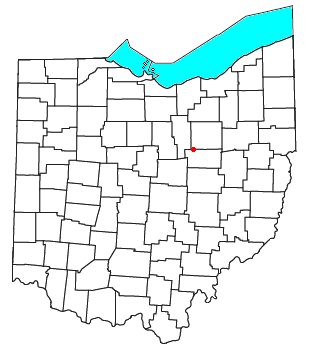
Location of Big Prairie, Ohio

Big Prairie is an unincorporated community in northwestern Ripley Township, Holmes County, Ohio, United States. It has a post office with the ZIP code 44611, and it lies less than one mile east of Odell Lake.

== History ==
The first settlement at Big Prairie was made in the 1810s; the community was named for a big prairie near the original town site.

During the early 1900s Big Prairie was the home of the "Monitor Self Heating Sad Iron Co". The company was located at 459 Wayne Street, in Big Prairie, Ohio, and their advertisement promised to "Make Ironing Easy and a Pleasure".
