= Catherine Dobbs =

American politician

Catherine Rose Biggs Dobbs (1908–1974) was the first woman mayor of a major industrial city, Barberton, Ohio, in the United States. Before running for mayor she was a noted historian and lecturer.

She was born in Shreve, Ohio. Studying journalism briefly at the University of Akron, she did not graduate.

In 1948, she became the first woman from the Akron area to hold a seat in the Ohio Senate. She was a Democrat, and served as mayor from 1956 to 1961.

In May 1962, she came in second behind Charles Babcock in the Democratic primary for Ohio Secretary of State.

== Electoral history ==
Ohio Secretary of State, Democratic Primary, 1962
| Party | Candidate | Votes | % | ±% |
|---|---|---|---|---|
| Democratic | Charles L. Babcock | 132,041 | 25.99 | 0 |
| Democratic | Catherine R. Dobbs | 118,690 | 23.36 | 0 |

Political offices
| Preceded by Robert L. Carson | Mayor of Barberton, Ohio; 1956–1961 | Succeeded by Stuart Moss |
