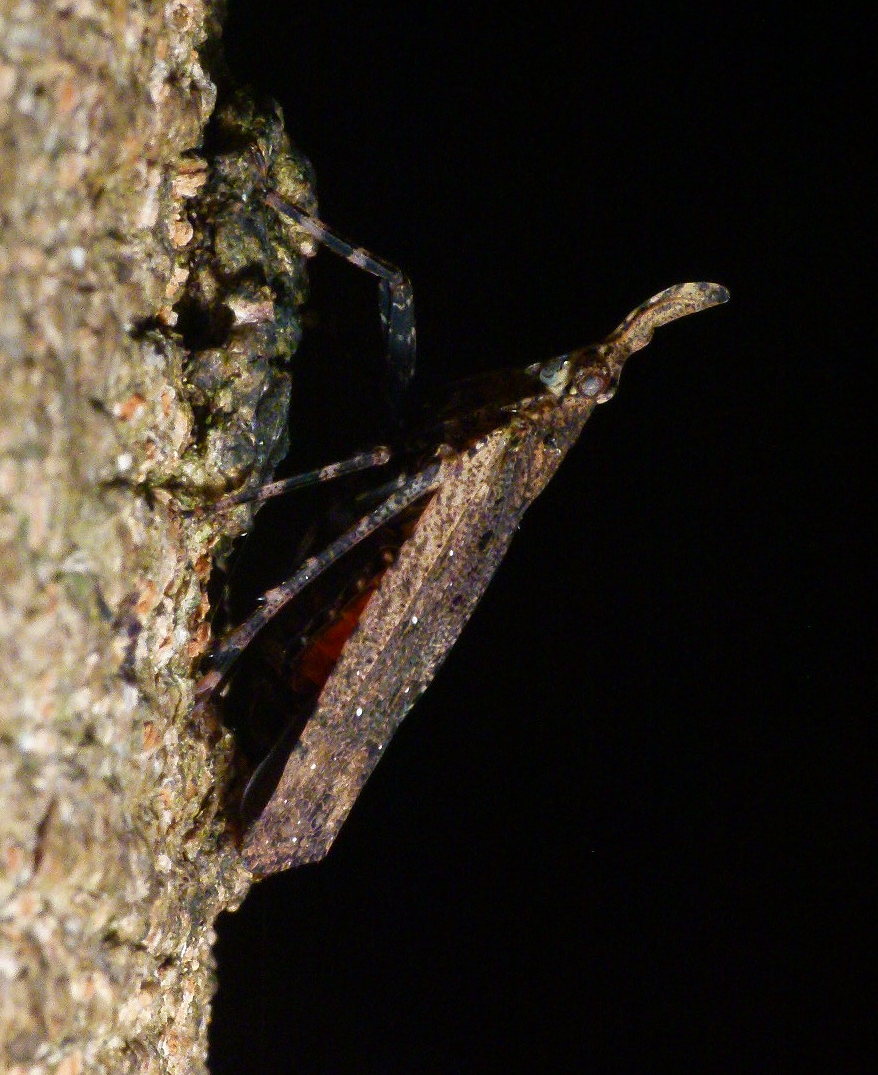
- Side view
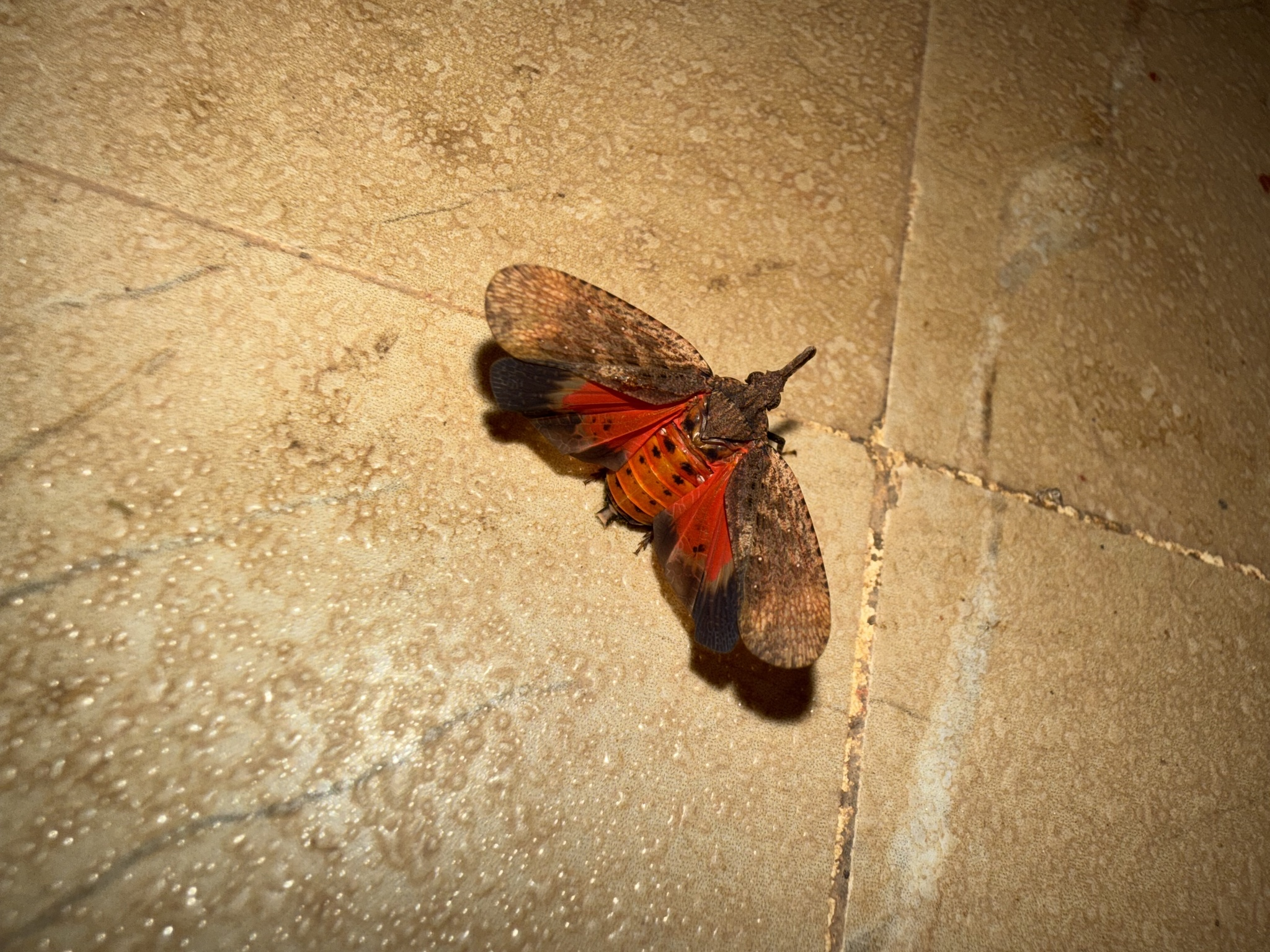

Scientific classification
- Kingdom: Animalia
- Phylum: Arthropoda
- Clade: Pancrustacea
- Class: Insecta
- Order: Hemiptera
- Suborder: Auchenorrhyncha
- Infraorder: Fulgoromorpha
- Family: Fulgoridae
- Subfamily: Amyclinae
- Genus: Alcathous; Stål, 1863

= Alcathous (planthopper) =

Genus of planthoppers

Alcathous is a monotypic genus containing the species Alcathous fecialis: a fulgorid planthopper, in the subfamily Amyclinae and found in southern India. It is predominantly brown with dark markings. Its snout curves slightly upward, and its wings are about 3 cm long and hide its short abdomen. From its eyes to the tip of its abdomen, A. fecialis is about 1.2 cm long with a 0.3 cm snout.

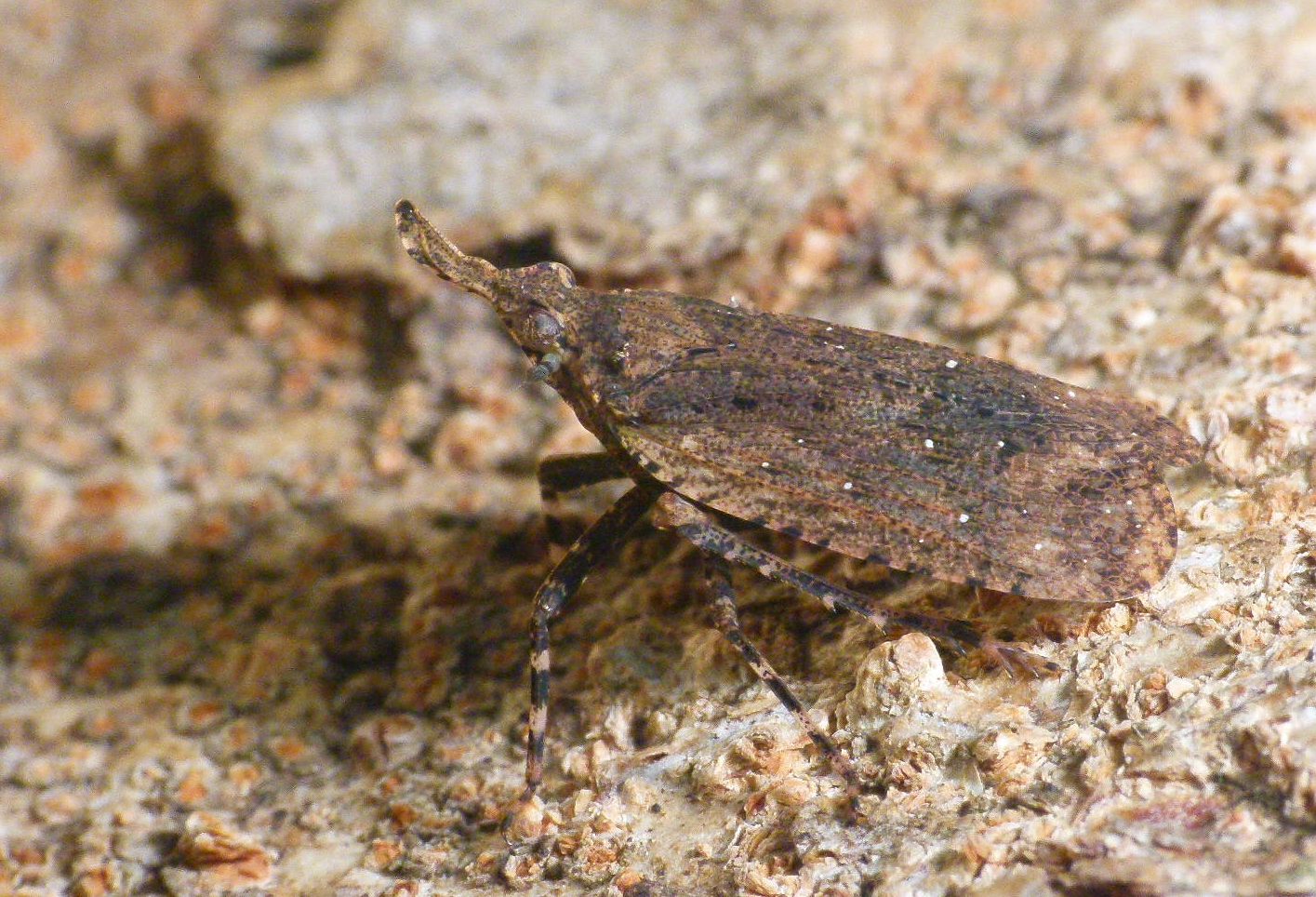
Sitting on bark
