= York United Methodist Church =

Historic church in Ohio, United States

- U.S. National Register of Historic Places
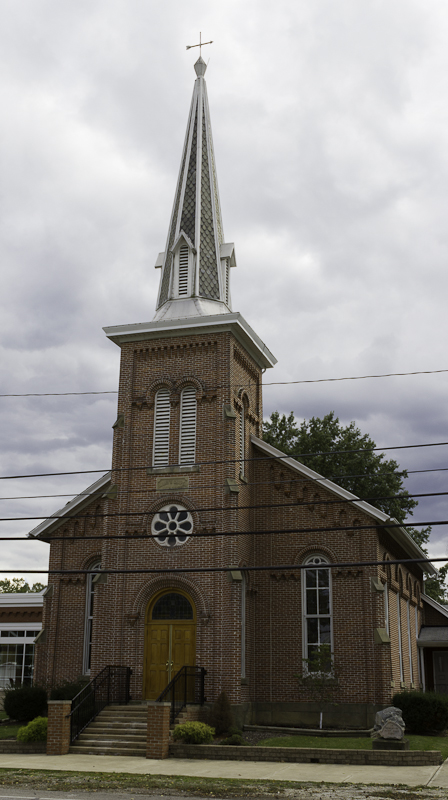
- Front of the church, with a slight bit of the western side

- Location within Ohio Location within the United States
- Location: 18 and Columbia Road Mallet Creek, Ohio
- Coordinates: 41°10′1″N 81°55′29″W
- Area: Less than 1 acre (0.40 ha)
- Built: 1877
- Architect: Thomas Rogers
- Architectural style: Romanesque Revival
- NRHP reference No.: 78002133
- Added to NRHP: February 17, 1978

The York United Methodist Church is a United Methodist congregation in Medina County, Ohio, United States. Formed during the middle of the 19th century, it worships in a prominent church building that has been named a historic site.

In the early 1840s (perhaps in 1841, but the date is uncertain), a Methodist Protestant minister formed a small religious society that worshipped in an old log schoolhouse near York Center. Until 1844, the group met both in the schoolhouse and in a private residence, but in the latter year a decision was made to build a frame church building. Growth over the next thirty years prompted the construction of a larger building in 1877, at a cost of $5,000; fully $3,000 of this total was donated by one woman, Mary Ford, from whose name was derived the church's nickname of "Mary's Chapel". The previous building was sold and converted into a house, while a group of members later donated a separate house to the church for use as a parsonage. Into the early twentieth century, this congregation was one of only two churches in York Township, along with a Congregationalist congregation founded in 1833.

Built of brick, the church is a Romanesque Revival building divided into four bays on the sides and three on the front. Tall windows fill the side bays and the left and right bays on the front, while a tower projects forward from the middle bay. Windows and the main entrance pierce the ground floor of the tower, with a wheel window and normal windows on higher stories; thanks to its spire, the tower is the tallest section of the building. Aside from the tower, the building was historically an ordinary rectangle in its floor plan, but the southern side (rear end) of the building was modified in the 1960s by the construction of an addition for classroom space. Although it was erected in the late 1870s, the building displays the style of an older era: carpenter Thomas Rogers, who was both architect and general contractor, produced a building reminiscent of Romanesque Revival churches from the beginning of the 19th century, at which time the Greek Revival style was far more popular in Ohio.

In early 1978, the church building was listed on the National Register of Historic Places, qualifying both because of its important architecture and because of the place it has played in the history of Mallet Creek and the surrounding area. Today, the congregation remains an active part of the East Ohio Annual Conference of the United Methodist Church.
