= Bloomfield, Washington County, Ohio =

Unincorporated community in Ohio, U.S.

Coordinates: 39°33′42″N 81°12′14″W

Bloomfield is an unincorporated community in Washington County, in the U.S. state of Ohio.

== History ==
Bloomfield was laid out around 1840. The community once had a gristmill, sawmill, and brewery.
