= East Harbor State Park =

Park in Ohio, USA

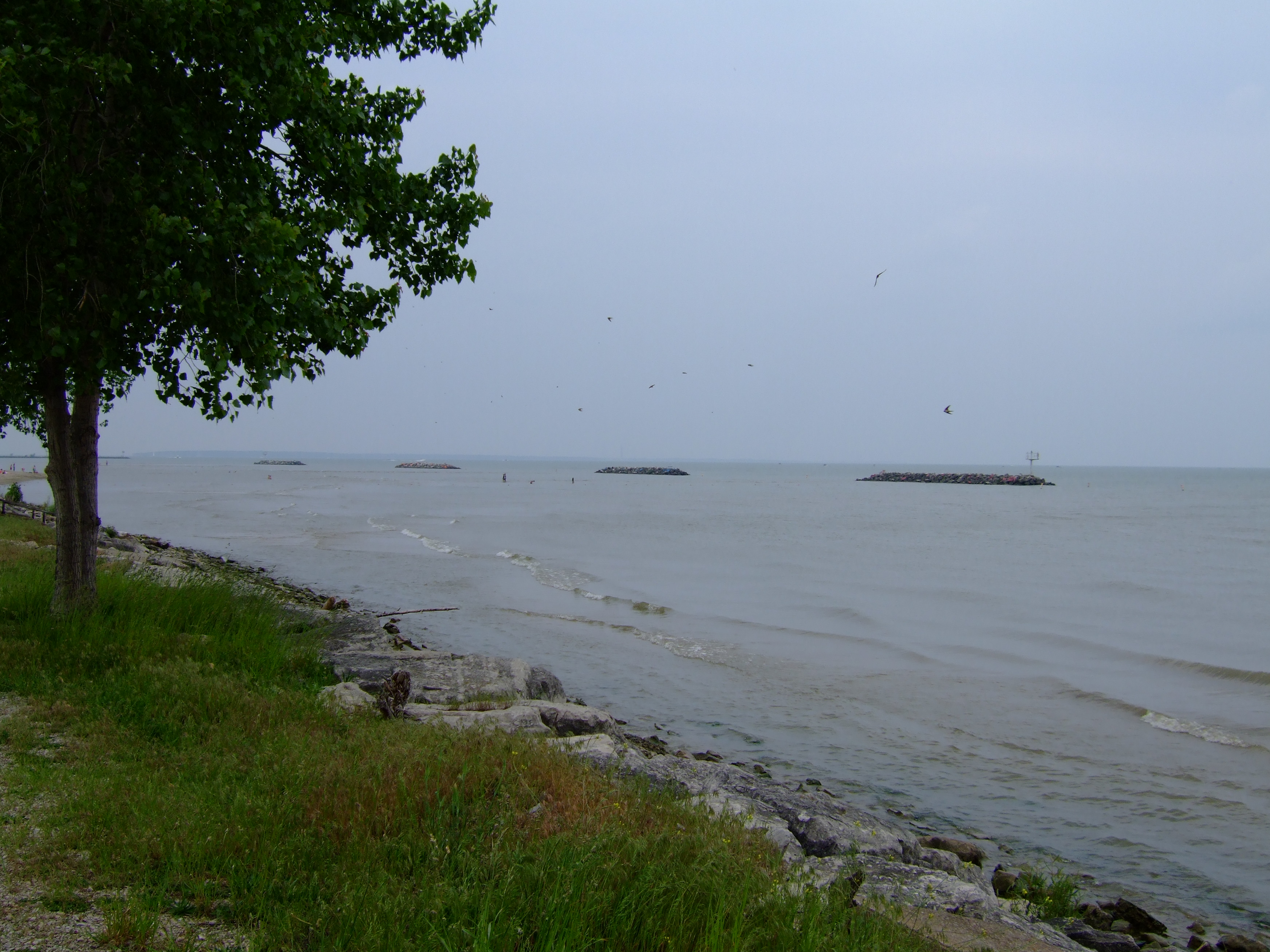
- Lake Erie with split breakwall

- Location within Ohio Location within the United States
- Location: Ottawa County, Ohio, United States
- Coordinates: 41°32′51″N 82°48′36″W
- Area: 1,831 acres (741 ha)
- Elevation: 587 ft (179 m)
- Established: 1947
- Administrator: Ohio Department of Natural Resources
- Designation: Ohio state park
- Website: East Harbor State Park

East Harbor State Park is a public recreation area located eight miles (13 km) northwest of Sandusky, Ohio on the shores of Lake Erie. The state park includes beach, campground, marina, and wetland wildlife preserve areas. The park offers swimming, boating and fishing, ten miles (16 km) of multi-use trails, picnicking, hunting, and disc golf.

== Beach ==
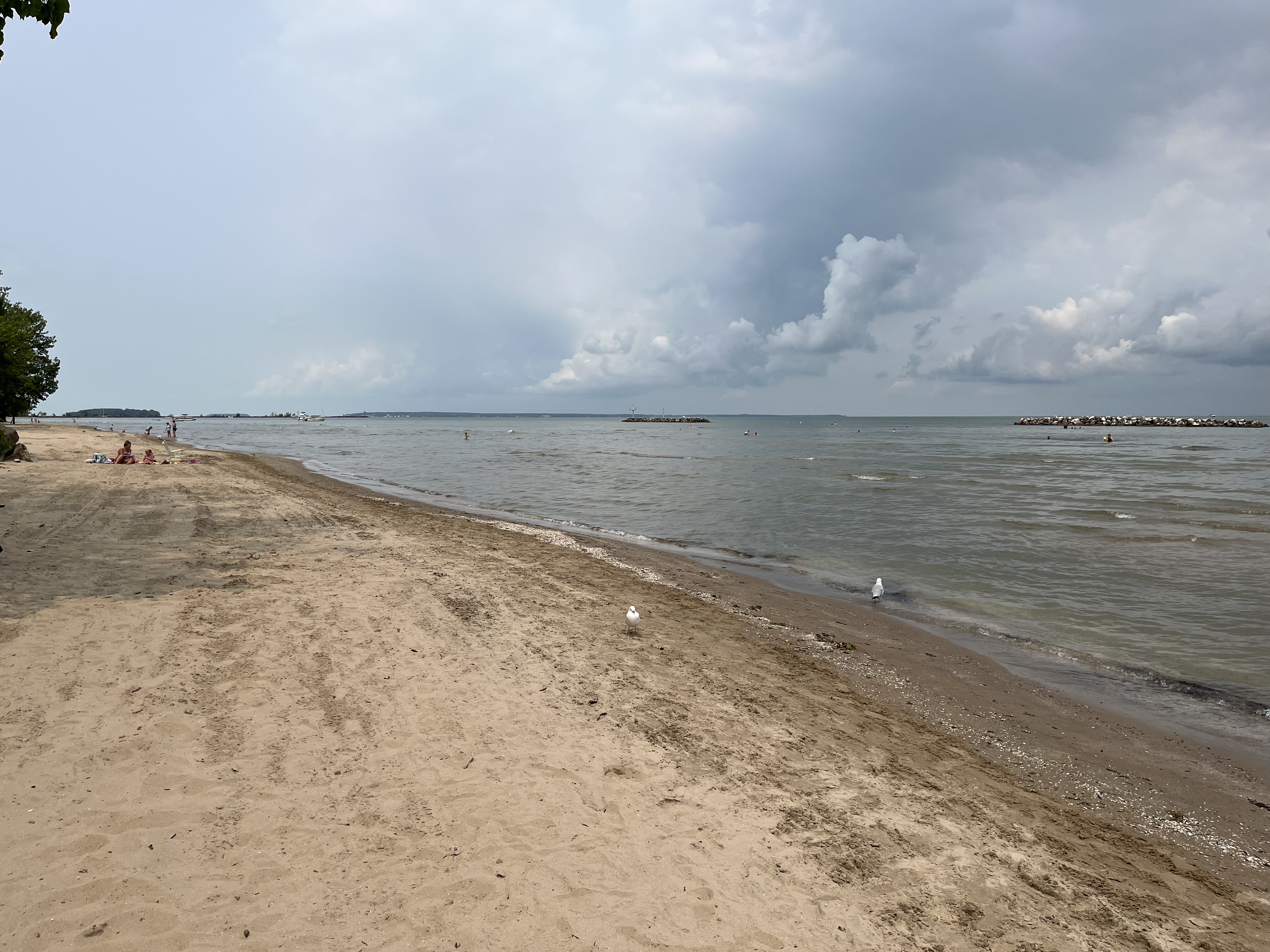
The beach in 2023

A thin stretch of sand beach juts northward into the waters of Lake Erie, separating Middle Harbor from the lake. Part of this beach was damaged in 1972 by a storm washing away a large section of the two-mile (3 km) beach. The current beach is a much smaller area to the north of the park, where swimming is permitted. Four segmented offshore breakwaters have been constructed on the northern section of beach, to sustain what is left of the sandy shoreline.
