= Osceola, Ohio =

Unincorporated community in Ohio, U.S.

Coordinates: 39°20′30″N 84°03′19″W

Osceola is an unincorporated community in Warren County, in the U.S. state of Ohio.

== History ==
Osceola was platted in 1838, and named after Osceola, the leader of the Seminole in Florida. Variant spellings have included "Oceola" and "Osseola".
