= Theodore B. Mitchell =

American entomologist (1890–1983)

- Born: Theodore Bertis Mitchell; October 26, 1890; Cambridge, Massachusetts, U.S.
- Died: February 10, 1983 (aged 92); Moore County, North Carolina, U.S.
- Education: Massachusetts Agricultural College (BS); North Carolina State University (MS); Harvard University (ScD)
- Occupation: Entomologist
- Scientific career
- Fields: Entomology

Theodore Bertis Mitchell (October 26, 1890 – February 10, 1983) was an American entomologist. He composed what is still considered the seminal work in the area of eastern North American bee fauna: Bees of the Eastern United States vols I and II. He was a leading expert on the genus Megachile.

Mitchell was born in Cambridge, Massachusetts, on October 26, 1890. He learned to collect and pin butterflies as well as rear moths and butterflies at an early age. A gymnasium accident at school caused vision and neck problems. He went to Huntington School and in his spare time he played the trumpet and considered a career in music. He attended Massachusetts Agricultural College (now called the University of Massachusetts Amherst), from which he graduated with a B.S. degree in 1920 with a major in entomology. During World War I he went to Camp Devens and joined the 302 Infantry Band of the 76th division. He was sent to Liverpool in June 1918 and the band went to France, entertaining the troops with classical concerts on Sundays. On return his band played at a ceremony where General Pershing awarded Alvin York. He graduated in 1924 with an M.S. from North Carolina State University and in 1928 with a Sc.D. from Harvard University. From 1920 to 1925 he worked as a plant nursery inspector for the North Carolina Department of Agriculture. A project to compile a list of the insects of North Carolina was begun by Franklin Sherman and led by C. S. Brimley and Mitchell assisted in this. His inspection work involved monitoring the boll weevil and the Mexican bean beetle. He was also involved in checking for foulbrood in honey bee hives but he had little interest in captive bees. He would comment that his “relation to the honey bee is the same as that of a bird watcher to the poultry industry.” In winters he also took classes at Raleigh and completed his master's degree in 1924. Here he met Olivia Gowan whom he married. His advisor was Zeno Metcalf, a specialist on the Auchenorrhyncha. In the departments of zoology and entomology of North Carolina State University, he was an assistant professor from 1925 to 1930. Metcalf suggested that he do a doctorate at Harvard and in 1926 he completed it and he became an associate professor from 1930 to 1938, and a full professor from 1938 until his retirement in 1961 as professor emeritus. During World War II he looked at mosquito control and later supervised John Geary to study resistance of mosquitoes to DDT. He was also concerned about the effects of pesticides on pollinators. He died in Moore County, North Carolina.

Mitchell was elected in 1937 a fellow of the Entomological Society of America.
