= Weymouth, Ohio =

Unincorporated community in Ohio, U.S.

Coordinates: 41°11′08″N 81°47′39″W

Weymouth is an unincorporated community in Medina County, in the U.S. state of Ohio.

== History ==
The community was named after Weymouth, Massachusetts, the native home of an early settler. A post office called Weymouth was established in 1824, and remained in operation until 1905. By the 1880s, Weymouth had a cheese factory and several country stores.
