= Washington Township, Holmes County, Ohio =

Township in Ohio, US

- Township
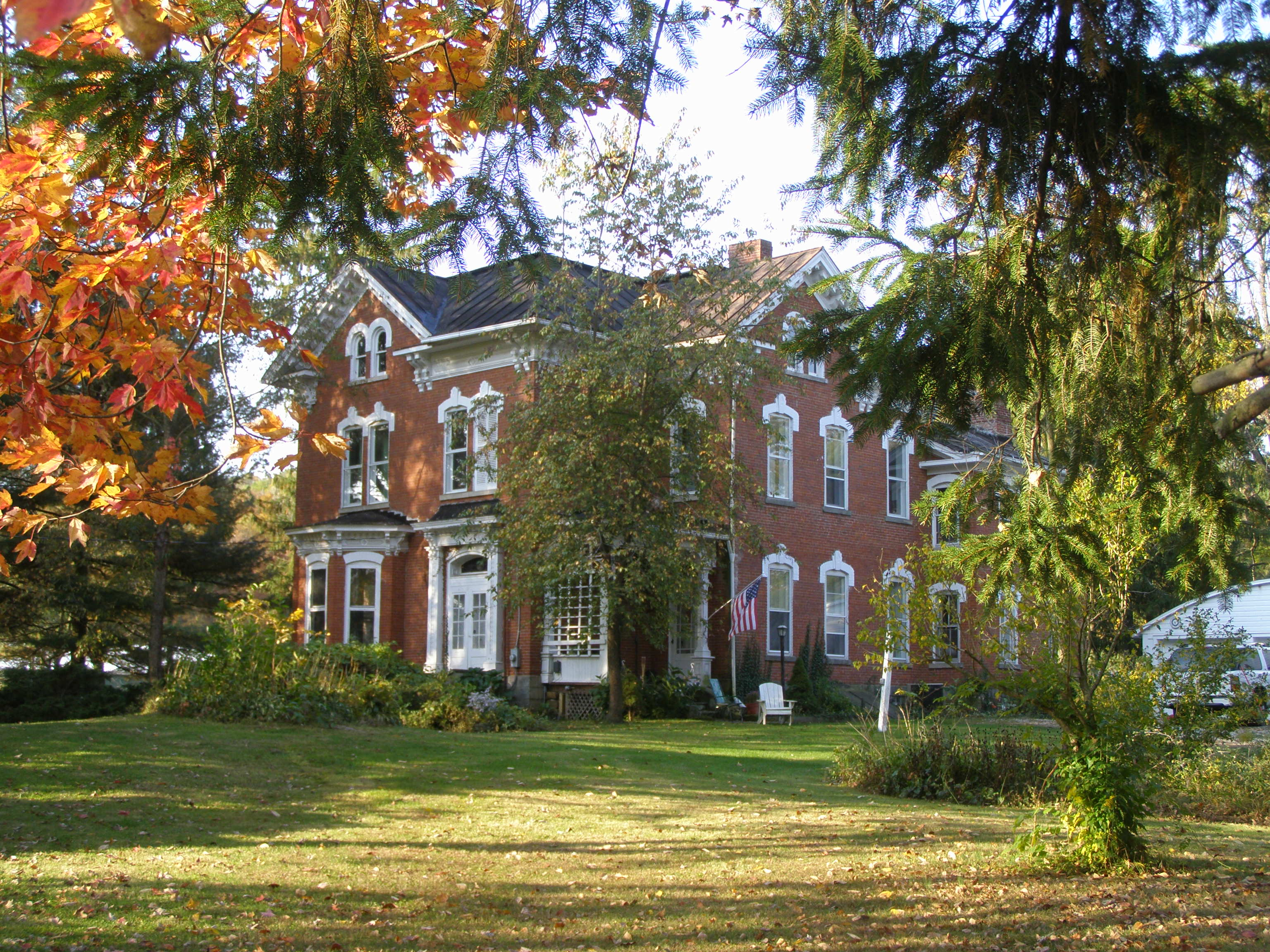
- The Joseph L. DeYarmon House, a historic site in the township

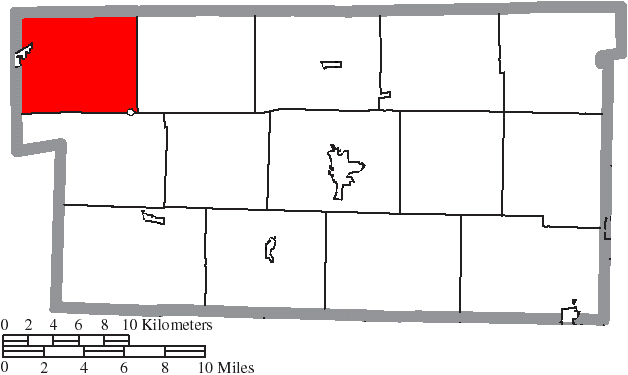
- Location of Washington Township in Holmes County
- Coordinates: 40°37′45″N 82°9′16″W
- Country: United States
- State: Ohio
- County: Holmes

Area
  - Total: 29.94 sq mi (77.55 km^{2})
  - Land: 29.54 sq mi (76.50 km^{2})
  - Water: 0.41 sq mi (1.05 km^{2})
- Elevation: 1,122 ft (342 m)

Population (2020)
  - Total: 1,675
  - Density: 56.71/sq mi (21.90/km^{2})
- Time zone: UTC-5 (Eastern (EST))
  - Summer (DST): UTC-4 (EDT)
- FIPS code: 39-81368
- GNIS feature ID: 1086340

Historical population
Census	Pop.	Note	%±
1990	1,454		—
2000	1,614		11.0%
2010	1,624		0.6%
2020	1,675		3.1%
2024 (est.)	1,685		0.6%
U.S. Census:

Washington Township is one of the fourteen townships of Holmes County, Ohio, United States. As of the 2020 census the population was 1,675.

== Geography ==
Located in the northwestern corner of the county, it borders the following townships:

- Lake Township, Ashland County - north
- Clinton Township, Wayne County - northeast
- Ripley Township - east
- Knox Township - south
- Hanover Township, Ashland County - southwest
- Green Township, Ashland County - northwest

Several populated places are located in Washington Township:

- Part of the village of Loudonville, in the west
- Part of the village of Nashville, in the southeast
- The unincorporated community of Lakeville, in the northeast

== Name and history ==
It is one of forty-three Washington Townships statewide.

== Government ==
The township is governed by a three-member board of trustees, who are elected in November of odd-numbered years to a four-year term beginning on the following January 1. Two are elected in the year after the presidential election and one is elected in the year before it. There is also an elected township fiscal officer, who serves a four-year term beginning on April 1 of the year after the election, which is held in November of the year before the presidential election. Vacancies in the fiscal officership or on the board of trustees are filled by the remaining trustees.
