= Knox Township, Holmes County, Ohio =

Township in Ohio, US

- Township
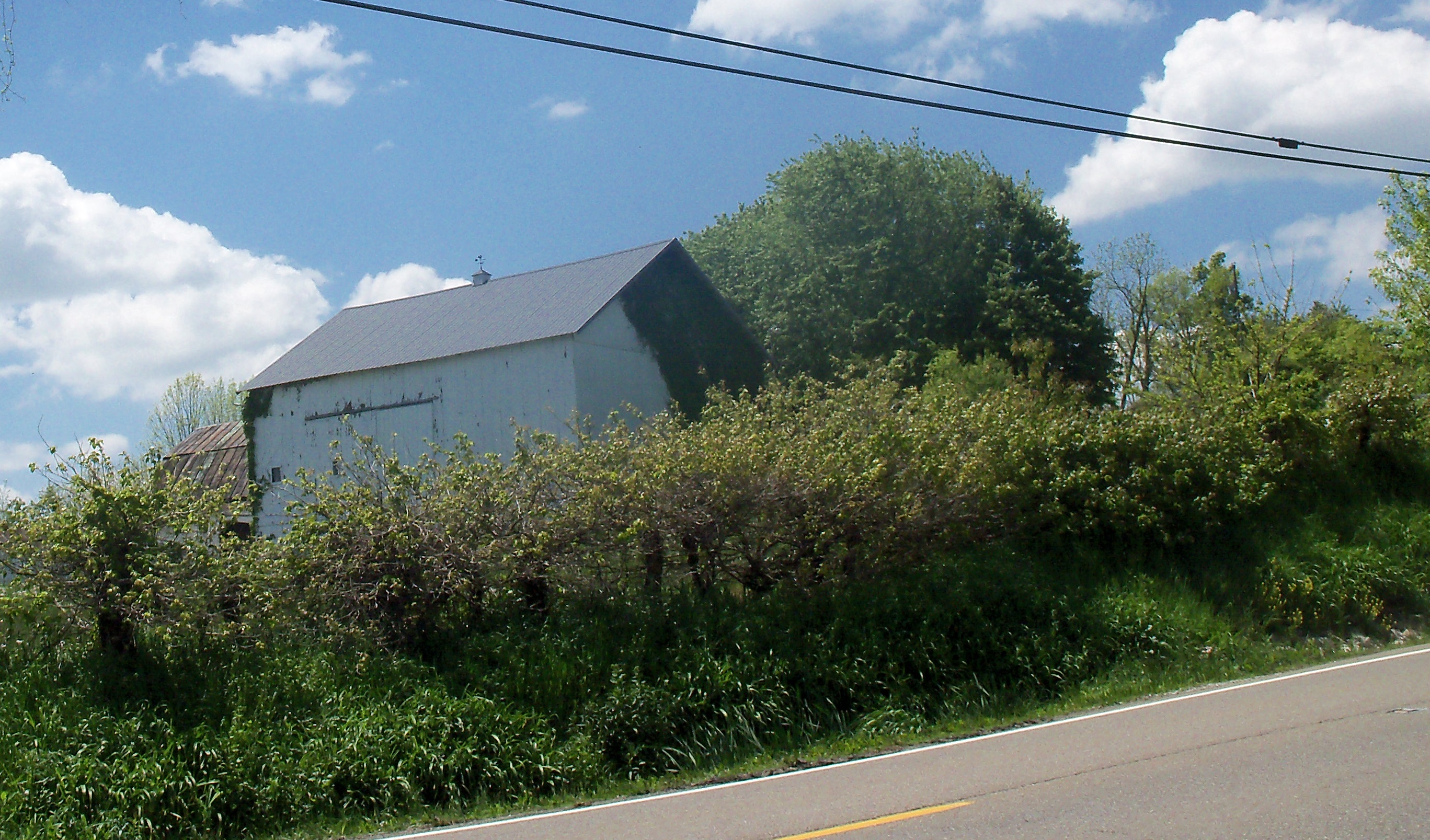
- Barn on Route 39 near Nashville

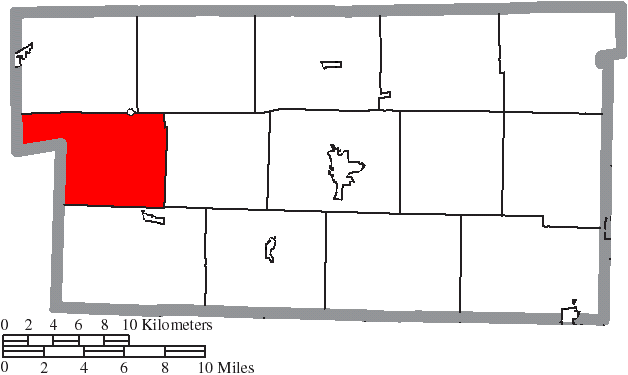
- Location of Knox Township in Holmes County
- Coordinates: 40°34′40″N 82°9′32″W
- Country: United States
- State: Ohio
- County: Holmes

Area
  - Total: 27.91 sq mi (72.29 km^{2})
  - Land: 27.82 sq mi (72.05 km^{2})
  - Water: 0.093 sq mi (0.24 km^{2})
- Elevation: 1,198 ft (365 m)

Population (2020)
  - Total: 1,144
  - Density: 41.12/sq mi (15.88/km^{2})
- Time zone: UTC-5 (Eastern (EST))
  - Summer (DST): UTC-4 (EDT)
- FIPS code: 39-40852
- GNIS feature ID: 1086331

Historical population
Census	Pop.	Note	%±
1990	972		—
2000	1,095		12.7%
2010	1,117		2.0%
2020	1,144		2.4%
2024 (est.)	1,178		3.0%
US Census:

Knox Township is one of the fourteen townships of Holmes County, Ohio, United States. As of the 2020 census the population was 1,144.

== Geography ==
Located in the western part of the county, it borders the following townships:

- Washington Township - north
- Ripley Township - northeast
- Monroe Township - east
- Richland Township - south
- Jefferson Township, Knox County - southwest
- Hanover Township, Ashland County - northwest

Part of the village of Nashville is located in northern Knox Township.

== Name and history ==
It is one of five Knox Townships statewide.

== Government ==
The township is governed by a three-member board of trustees, who are elected in November of odd-numbered years to a four-year term beginning on the following January 1. Two are elected in the year after the presidential election and one is elected in the year before it. There is also an elected township fiscal officer, who serves a four-year term beginning on April 1 of the year after the election, which is held in November of the year before the presidential election. Vacancies in the fiscal officership or on the board of trustees are filled by the remaining trustees.
