= Mallet Creek, Ohio =

- Unincorporated community
- Location within Ohio Location within the United States
- Coordinates: 41°10′02″N 81°55′32″W
- Country: United States
- State: Ohio
- County: Medina
- Township: York
- Elevation: 1,014 ft (309 m)
- Time zone: UTC-5 (Eastern (EST))
  - Summer (DST): UTC-4 (EDT)
- ZIP Code: 44256 (Medina)
- Area codes: 234 & 330
- GNIS feature ID: 1061463

Mallet Creek is an unincorporated community in York Township, Medina County, Ohio, United States.

It was named for Dan Mallet, an early settler in the area. In the 1850s, it was an active stop on the Underground Railroad.

It is the location of York United Methodist Church, which is listed on the National Register of Historic Places.
