= Colby, Ohio =

Unincorporated community in Ohio, U.S.

Coordinates: 41°15′48″N 82°56′47″W

Colby is an unincorporated community in Sandusky County, in the U.S. state of Ohio.

== History ==
A post office called Colby was established in 1884, and remained in operation until 1905. Besides the post office, Colby had a station on the Nickel Plate Railroad.
