= Chicago common brick =

Brick made in Chicago during the 20th century

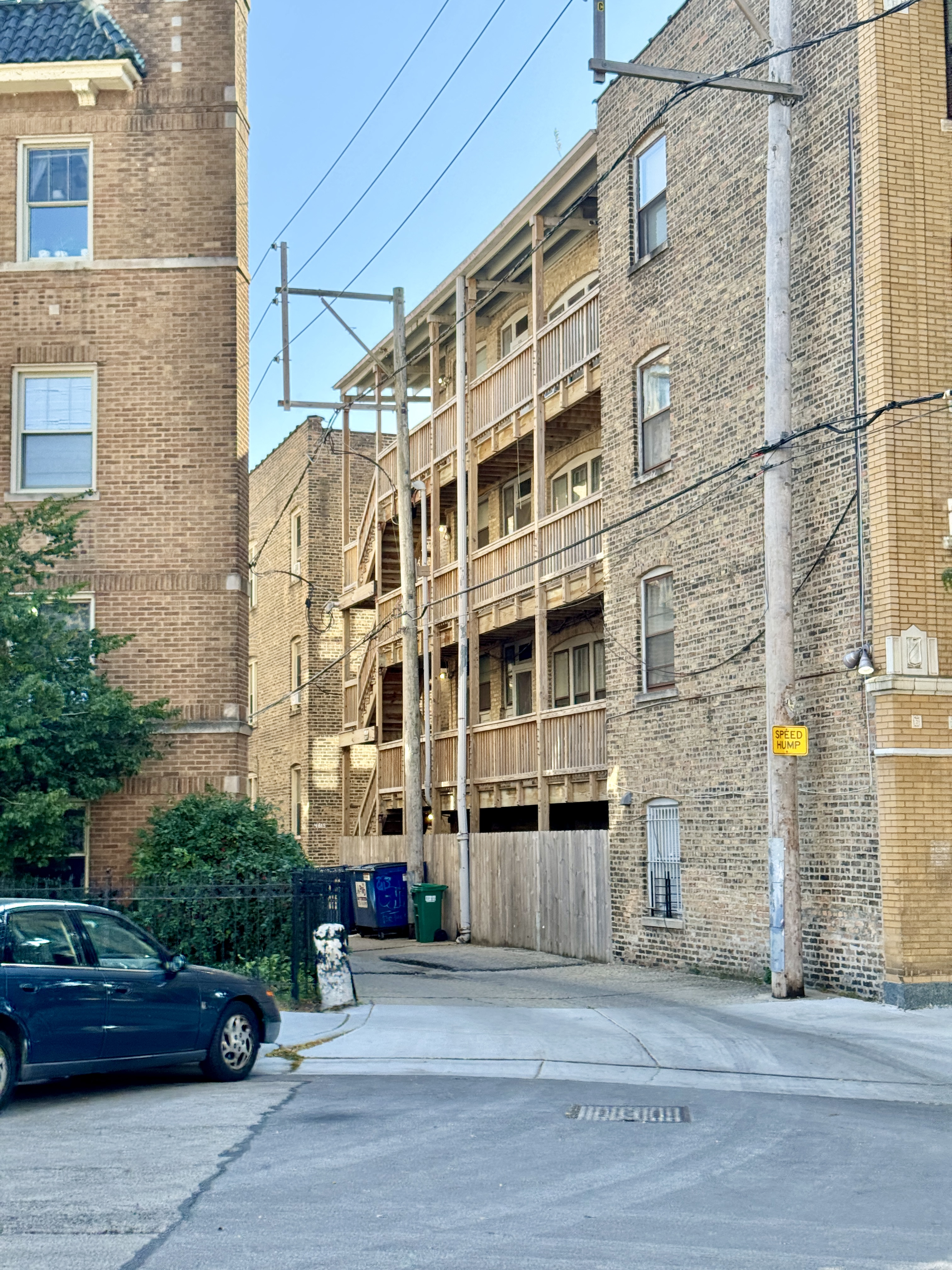
The rear wall of this 1920s-era apartment building in Lincoln Square is built from Chicago common brick, contrasting with its facade

Chicago common brick are bricks that were made in the area of Chicago during the 20th century.

== Material ==
They have a unique color range due to the raw materials and the way that they were manufactured. The clays used to make these bricks are unusually high in carbonates such as limestone, giving these bricks their lighter color. Many bricks were fired in periodic kilns or scove kilns that helped create their large color range.

== History ==
The use of brick construction increased in Chicago after the Great Chicago fire of 1871. They are called common brick since they were used in multiwythe mass walls with many of the bricks used on inner wythes while a facing brick was used for the outer wythe. Most of the brick manufacturers closed around the middle of the 20th century, and now Chicago Commons are highly desirable as a salvaged material.
