= Zeno Payne Metcalf =

American entomologist

- Born: 1 May 1885; Lakeville, Ohio, U.S.
- Died: 5 January 1956 (aged 70); Raleigh, North Carolina, U.S.
- Education: Ohio State University (AB); Harvard University (DSc)
- Occupation: Entomologist

Zeno Payne Metcalf (1 May 1885, Lakeville, Ohio – 5 January 1956, Raleigh, North Carolina) was an American entomologist specialising in Auchenorrhyncha.

== Education ==
Metcalf, born in Lakeville, Ohio, was educated at Ohio State University. He received his A.B. degree in 1908. He was an instructor at Michigan State College (1907-1908). He attended Harvard University and was awarded the degree of D.Sc. in 1924.

== Career ==
In 1908 he went to North Carolina to work as assistant entomologist for the North Carolina Department of Agriculture. He joined the faculty of North Carolina State College (now North Carolina State University) in 1912 as head of the Department of Zoology and Entomology, a position he held until 1950. From 1923 until 1944 he served as director of instruction for the School of Agriculture and Life Sciences; from 1940 until 1943 was director of graduate studies at North Carolina State College; and from 1943 to 1950 was associate dean of the Graduate School of the Consolidated University of North Carolina. Metcalf retired from administrative duties in 1950 but continued to work as a research professor of entomology from 1950 until his death in 1956. Metcalf Residence Hall, the tallest residential building at North Carolina State University, was named in his honor.

Metcalf was elected in 1934 a fellow of the Entomological Society of America.

== Research ==
For most of his career Metcalf was dedicated to compiling and cataloguing his vast library of research materials relating to the insect group called Homoptera (most of which are now classified in the suborder Auchenorrhyncha), and was working on the General Catalogue of the Homoptera of the World, the 42-volume index to his collection, until his death in 1956.
