= Clinton Township, Wayne County, Ohio =

Township in Ohio, US

- Township
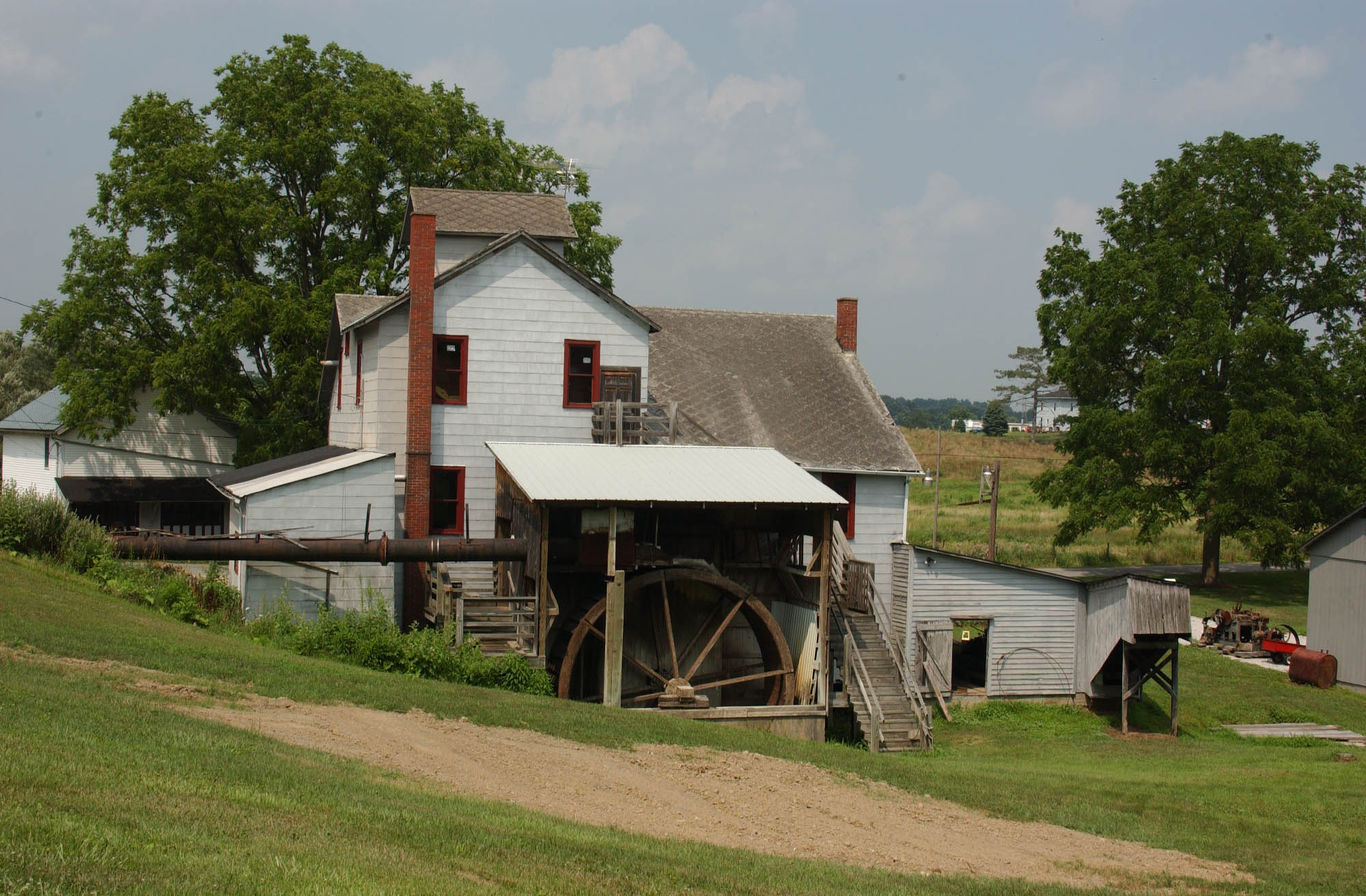
- Kister Mill

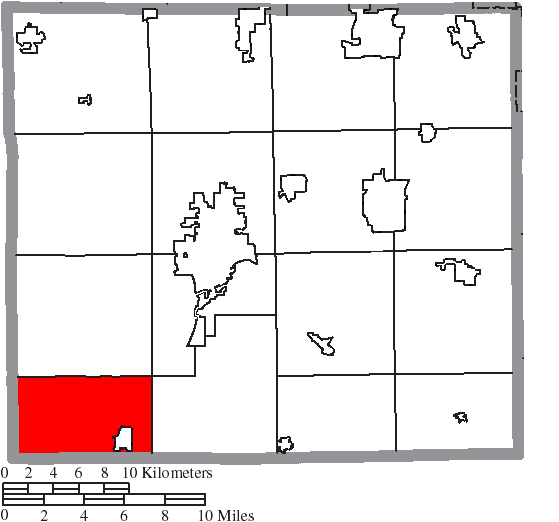
- Location of Clinton Township in Wayne County
- Coordinates: 40°41′8″N 82°2′32″W
- Country: United States
- State: Ohio
- County: Wayne

Area
  - Total: 27.9 sq mi (72.2 km^{2})
  - Land: 27.8 sq mi (71.9 km^{2})
  - Water: 0.12 sq mi (0.3 km^{2})
- Elevation: 890 ft (270 m)

Population (2020)
  - Total: 3,165
  - Density: 110/sq mi (44/km^{2})
- Time zone: UTC-5 (Eastern (EST))
  - Summer (DST): UTC-4 (EDT)
- FIPS code: 39-16224
- GNIS feature ID: 1087152

Historical population
| Census | Pop. | Note | %± |
|---|---|---|---|
| 1990 | 3,028 | | — |
| 2000 | 3,196 | | 5.5% |
| 2010 | 3,081 | | −3.6% |
| 2020 | 3,165 | | 2.7% |
U.S. Census:

Clinton Township is one of the sixteen townships of Wayne County, Ohio, United States. The 2020 census found 3,165 people in the township.

== Geography ==
Located in the southwestern corner of the county, it borders the following townships:

- Plain Township - north
- Wooster Township - northeast corner
- Franklin Township - east
- Prairie Township, Holmes County - southeast corner
- Ripley Township, Holmes County - south
- Washington Township, Holmes County - southwest
- Lake Township, Ashland County - west
- Mohican Township, Ashland County - northwest corner

The village of Shreve is located in southeastern Clinton Township.

== Name and history ==
It is one of seven Clinton Townships statewide.

== Government ==
The township is governed by a three-member board of trustees, who are elected in November of odd-numbered years to a four-year term beginning on the following January 1. Two are elected in the year after the presidential election and one is elected in the year before it. There is also an elected township fiscal officer, who serves a four-year term beginning on April 1 of the year after the election, which is held in November of the year before the presidential election. Vacancies in the fiscal officership or on the board of trustees are filled by the remaining trustees.
