= Danville, Ohio =

- Village
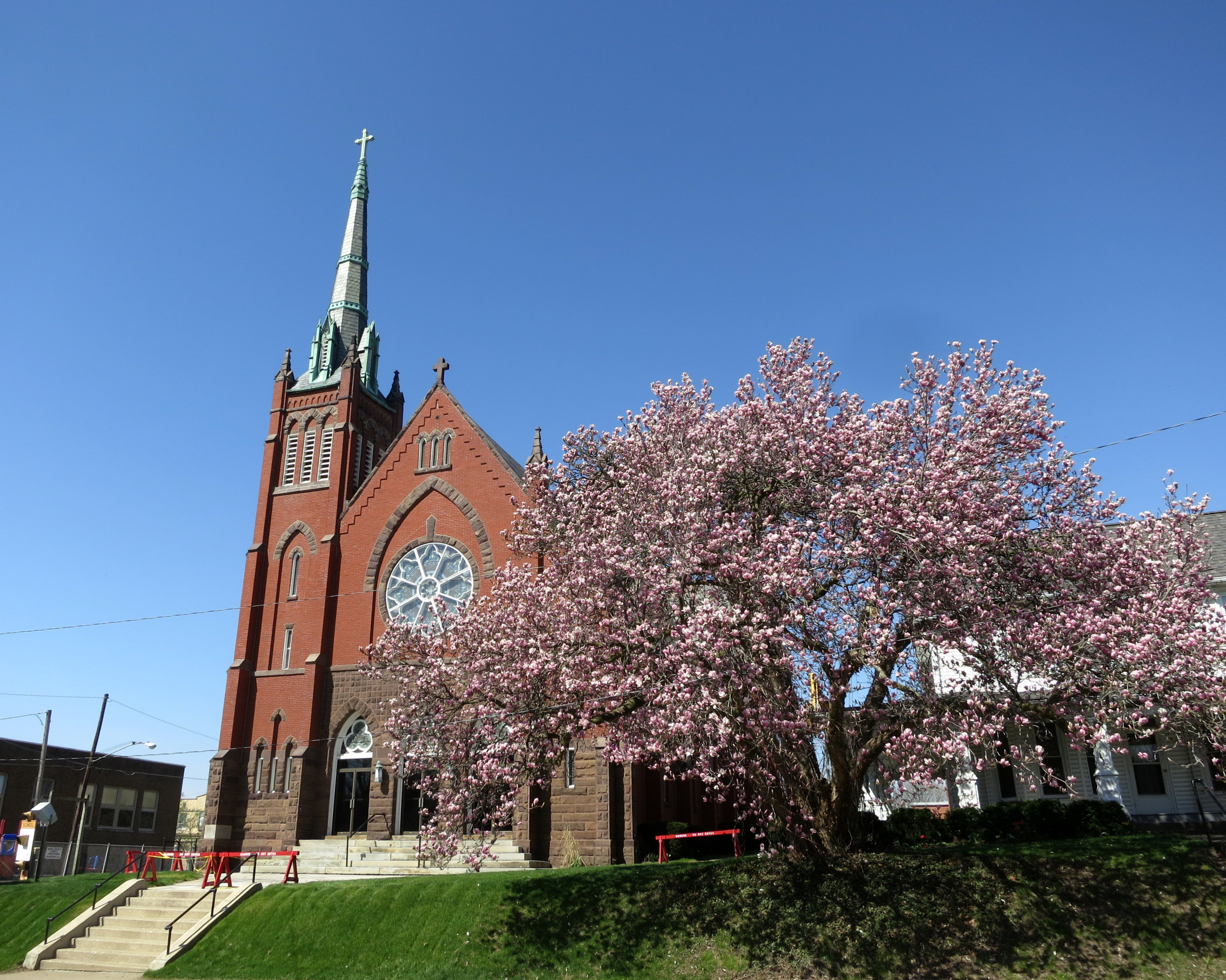
- St. Luke's Catholic Church
- Motto: "Gateway To Amish Country"
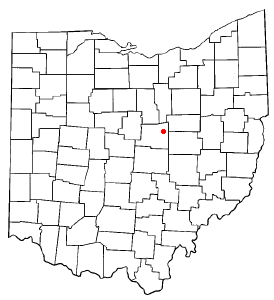
- Location of Danville, Ohio

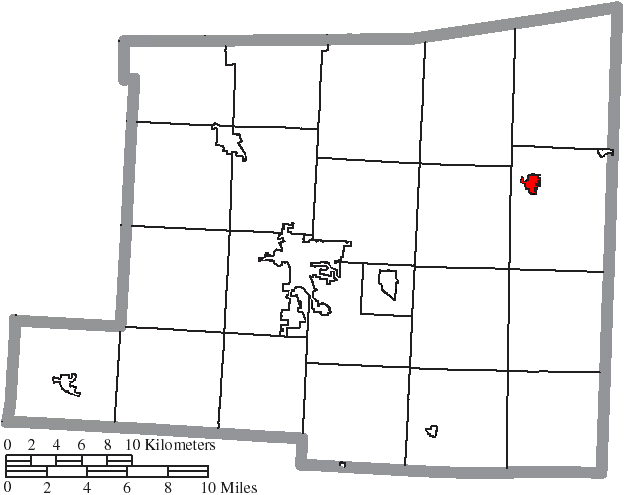
- Location of Danville in Knox County
- Coordinates: 40°26′50″N 82°15′41″W
- Country: United States
- State: Ohio
- County: Knox
- Township: Union

Area
  - Total: 0.59 sq mi (1.54 km^{2})
  - Land: 0.59 sq mi (1.53 km^{2})
  - Water: 0.0039 sq mi (0.01 km^{2})
- Elevation: 994 ft (303 m)

Population (2020)
  - Total: 1,019
  - Estimate (2023): 996
  - Density: 1,725.6/sq mi (666.24/km^{2})
- Time zone: UTC-5 (Eastern (EST))
  - Summer (DST): UTC-4 (EDT)
- ZIP code: 43014
- Area code: 740
- FIPS code: 39-20114
- GNIS feature ID: 2398682
- Website: Village website

Danville is a village in Knox County, Ohio, United States. The population was 1,019 at the 2020 census.

== History ==
Modern Danville had its start in 1923 by the merging of two neighboring villages called Buckeye City and Rosstown (Rossville). The original Danville was laid out by George Sapp, Sr. and Robert Waddell in 1813 and was named for Daniel Sapp, a soldier in the War of 1812.

== Geography ==
According to the United States Census Bureau, the village has a total area of 0.56 square miles (1.45 km^{2}), of which 0.55 square miles (1.42 km^{2}) is land and 0.01 square miles (0.03 km^{2}) is water.

Buckeye City is a neighborhood of Danville. Buckeye City was laid out in 1880, and was annexed by the village of Danville in 1923.

== Demographics ==
Historical population
Census	Pop.	Note	%±
1830	234		—
1850	160		—
1870	134		—
1880	254		89.6%
1890	292		15.0%
1900	298		2.1%
1910	373		25.2%
1920	383		2.7%
1930	764		99.5%
1940	790		3.4%
1950	853		8.0%
1960	926		8.6%
1970	1,025		10.7%
1980	1,127		10.0%
1990	1,001		−11.2%
2000	1,104		10.3%
2010	1,044		−5.4%
2020	1,019		−2.4%
2023 (est.)	996	▼	−2.3%
U.S. Decennial Census

=== 2010 census ===
As of the census of 2010, there were 1,044 people, 425 households, and 281 families living in the village. The population density was 1,898.2 inhabitants per square mile (732.9/km^{2}). There were 474 housing units at an average density of 861.8 per square mile (332.7/km^{2}). The racial makeup of the village was 97.9% White, 0.6% African American, 0.4% Native American, 0.1% Asian, 0.2% from other races, and 0.9% from two or more races. Hispanic or Latino of any race were 1.2% of the population.

There were 425 households, of which 36.5% had children under the age of 18 living with them, 43.5% were married couples living together, 16.0% had a female householder with no husband present, 6.6% had a male householder with no wife present, and 33.9% were non-families. 28.2% of all households were made up of individuals, and 10.1% had someone living alone who was 65 years of age or older. The average household size was 2.46 and the average family size was 2.98.

The median age in the village was 33.8 years. 28.3% of residents were under the age of 18; 8.4% were between the ages of 18 and 24; 26% were from 25 to 44; 24.4% were from 45 to 64; and 12.8% were 65 years of age or older. The gender makeup of the village was 49.2% male and 50.8% female.

=== 2000 census ===
As of the census of 2000, there were 1,104 people, 442 households, and 292 families living in the village. The population density was 2,055.1 inhabitants per square mile (793.5/km^{2}). There were 479 housing units at an average density of 891.7 per square mile (344.3/km^{2}). The racial makeup of the village was 98.10% White, 0.09% African American, 0.09% Native American, 0.18% Asian, and 1.54% from two or more races. Hispanic or Latino of any race were 0.36% of the population.

There were 442 households, out of which 32.4% had children under the age of 18 living with them, 50.0% were married couples living together, 12.4% had a female householder with no husband present, and 33.9% were non-families. 28.7% of all households were made up of individuals, and 13.3% had someone living alone who was 65 years of age or older. The average household size was 2.50 and the average family size was 3.09.

In the village, the population was spread out, with 28.1% under the age of 18, 10.6% from 18 to 24, 25.8% from 25 to 44, 19.9% from 45 to 64, and 15.6% who were 65 years of age or older. The median age was 33 years. For every 100 females there were 101.1 males. For every 100 females age 18 and over, there were 90.9 males.

The median income for a household in the village was $28,636, and the median income for a family was $31,375. Males had a median income of $30,208 versus $22,500 for females. The per capita income for the village was $14,595. About 15.0% of families and 15.2% of the population were below the poverty line, including 18.1% of those under age 18 and 13.5% of those age 65 or over.

== Education ==
Danville Local School District operates Danville High School in the village.

Danville has a public library, a branch of The Public Library of Mount Vernon & Knox County.

== Notable people ==
- Jean-Baptiste Lamy, the first Archbishop of Santa Fe, New Mexico, lived in Danville from 1839 to 1847 when he served as a missionary priest at St. Luke's
- Robert M. Nevin, member of the United States House of Representatives from 1901 to 1905, born in Danville
- William E. Stanley, 15th governor of Kansas, born in Danville
