= Ripley Township, Holmes County, Ohio =

Township in Ohio, US

- Township
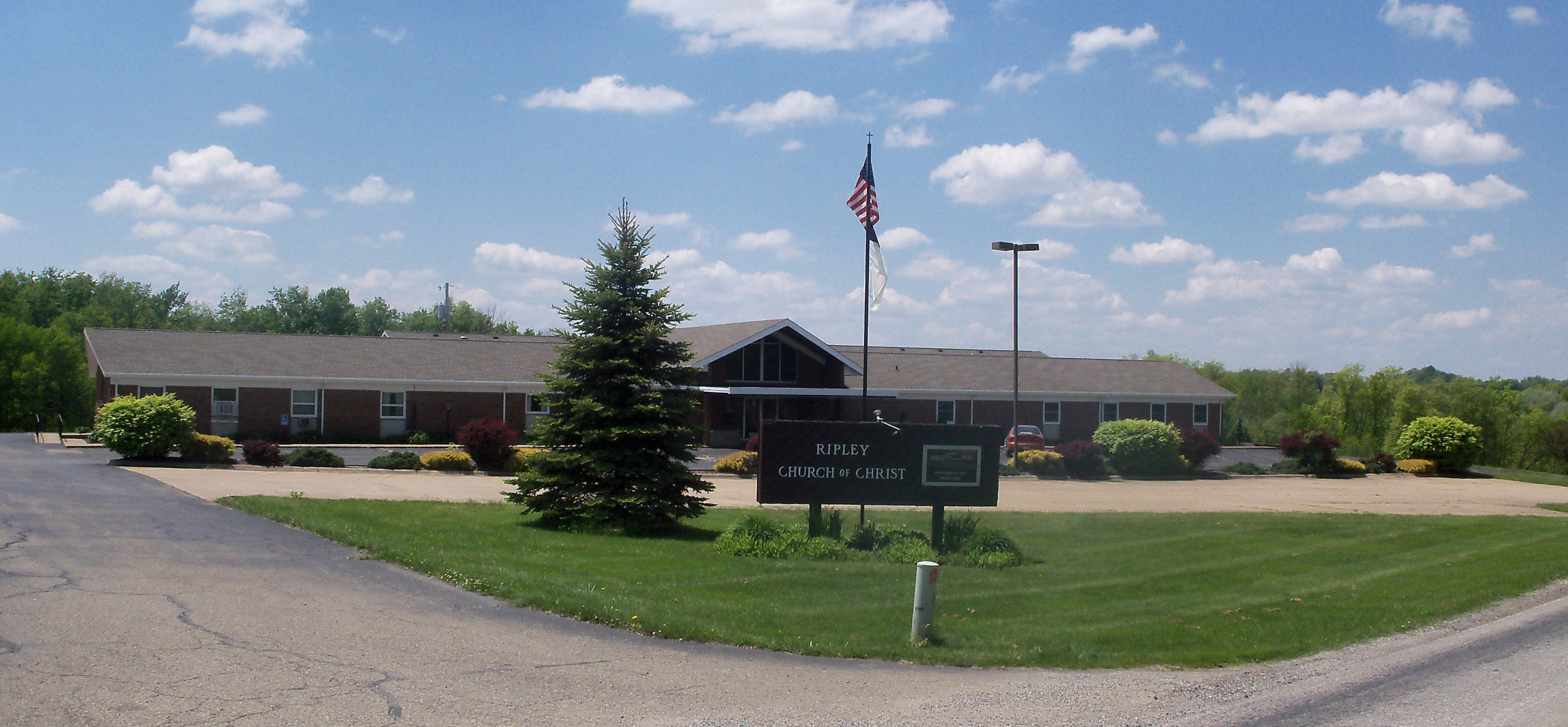
- Ripley Church of Christ, across the road from Ripley Cemetery

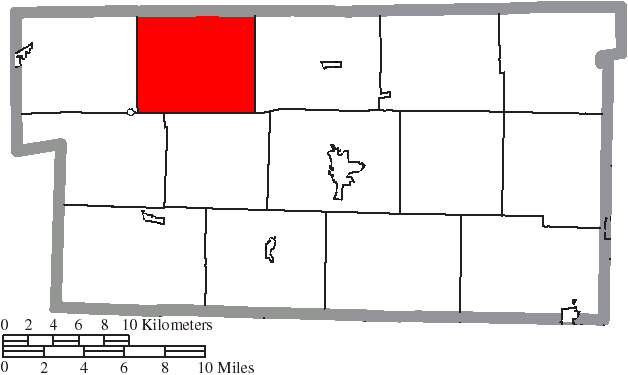
- Location of Ripley Township in Holmes County
- Coordinates: 40°38′12″N 82°3′39″W
- Country: United States
- State: Ohio
- County: Holmes

Area
  - Total: 29.6 sq mi (76.6 km^{2})
  - Land: 29.5 sq mi (76.4 km^{2})
  - Water: 0.077 sq mi (0.2 km^{2})
- Elevation: 1,220 ft (372 m)

Population (2020)
  - Total: 2,415
  - Density: 81.9/sq mi (31.6/km^{2})
- Time zone: UTC-5 (Eastern (EST))
  - Summer (DST): UTC-4 (EDT)
- FIPS code: 39-67286
- GNIS feature ID: 1086337

Historical population
Census	Pop.	Note	%±
1990	1,730		—
2000	2,194		26.8%
2010	2,338		6.6%
2020	2,415		3.3%
2024 (est.)	2,476		2.5%
U.S. Census:

Ripley Township is one of the fourteen townships of Holmes County, Ohio, United States. As of the 2020 census the population was 2,415.

== Geography ==
Located in the northern part of the county, it borders the following townships:

- Clinton Township, Wayne County – north
- Franklin Township, Wayne County – northeast corner
- Prairie Township – east
- Monroe Township – south
- Knox Township – southwest
- Washington Township – west

No municipalities are located in Ripley Township, although the unincorporated community of Big Prairie lies in the northwestern part of the township.

== Name and history ==
Statewide, the only other Ripley Township is located in Huron County.

== Government ==
The township is governed by a three-member board of trustees, who are elected in November of odd-numbered years to a four-year term beginning on the following January 1. Two are elected in the year after the presidential election and one is elected in the year before it. There is also an elected township fiscal officer, who serves a four-year term beginning on April 1 of the year after the election, which is held in November of the year before the presidential election. Vacancies in the fiscal officership or on the board of trustees are filled by the remaining trustees.
