= Lakeville, Ohio =

Unincorporated community in Ohio, U.S.

Coordinates: 40°39′22″N 82°07′38″W

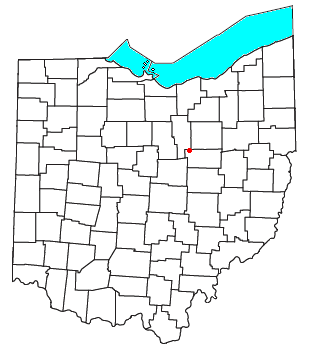
Location of Lakeville, Ohio

Lakeville is an unincorporated community in northeastern Washington Township, Holmes County, Ohio, United States. It has a post office with the ZIP code 44638. It lies along State Route 226 west of Odell Lake and south of Bonnett and Round Lakes.

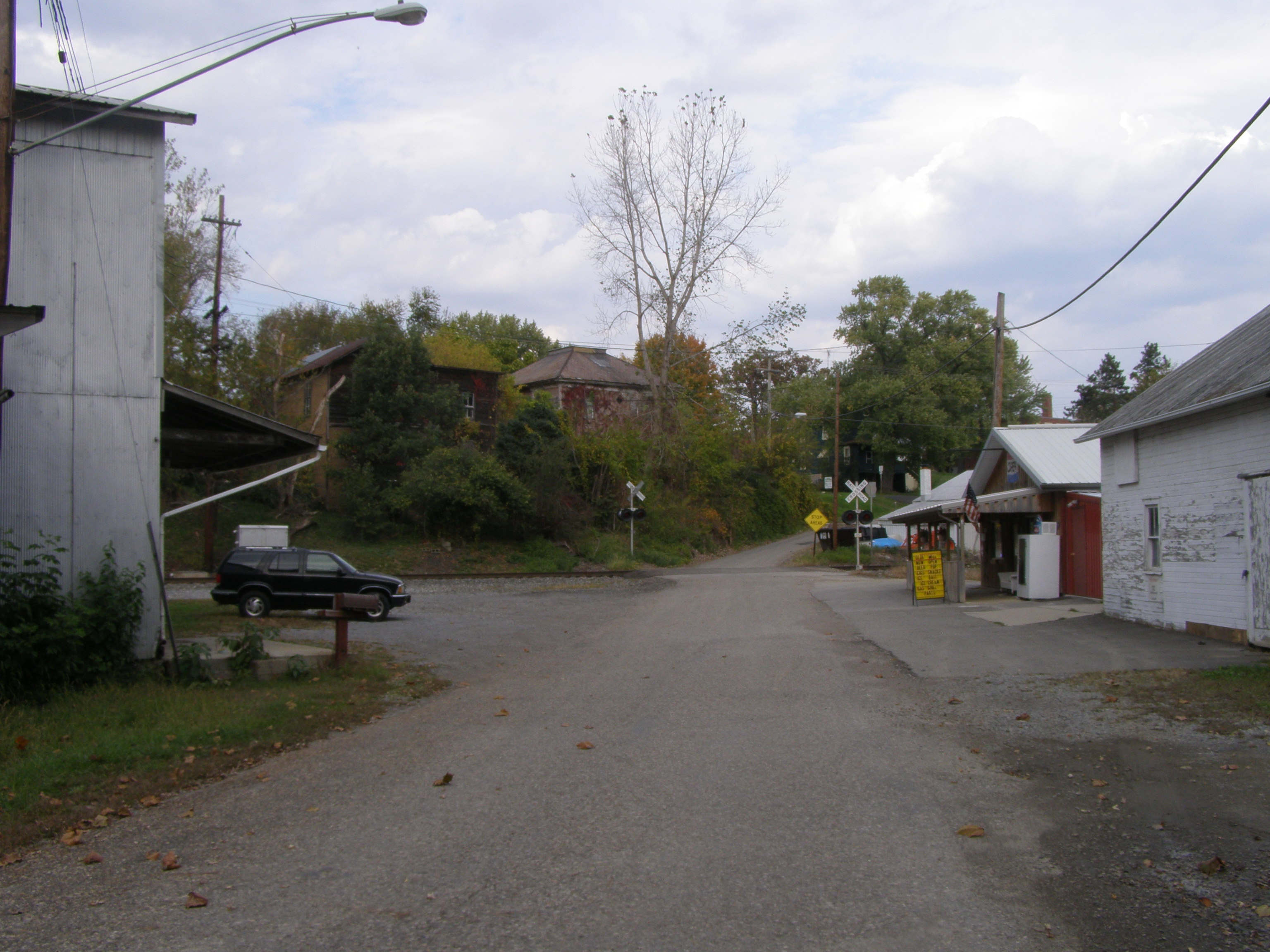
Lakeville, Holmes County, Ohio
