= Shreve, Ohio =

- Village
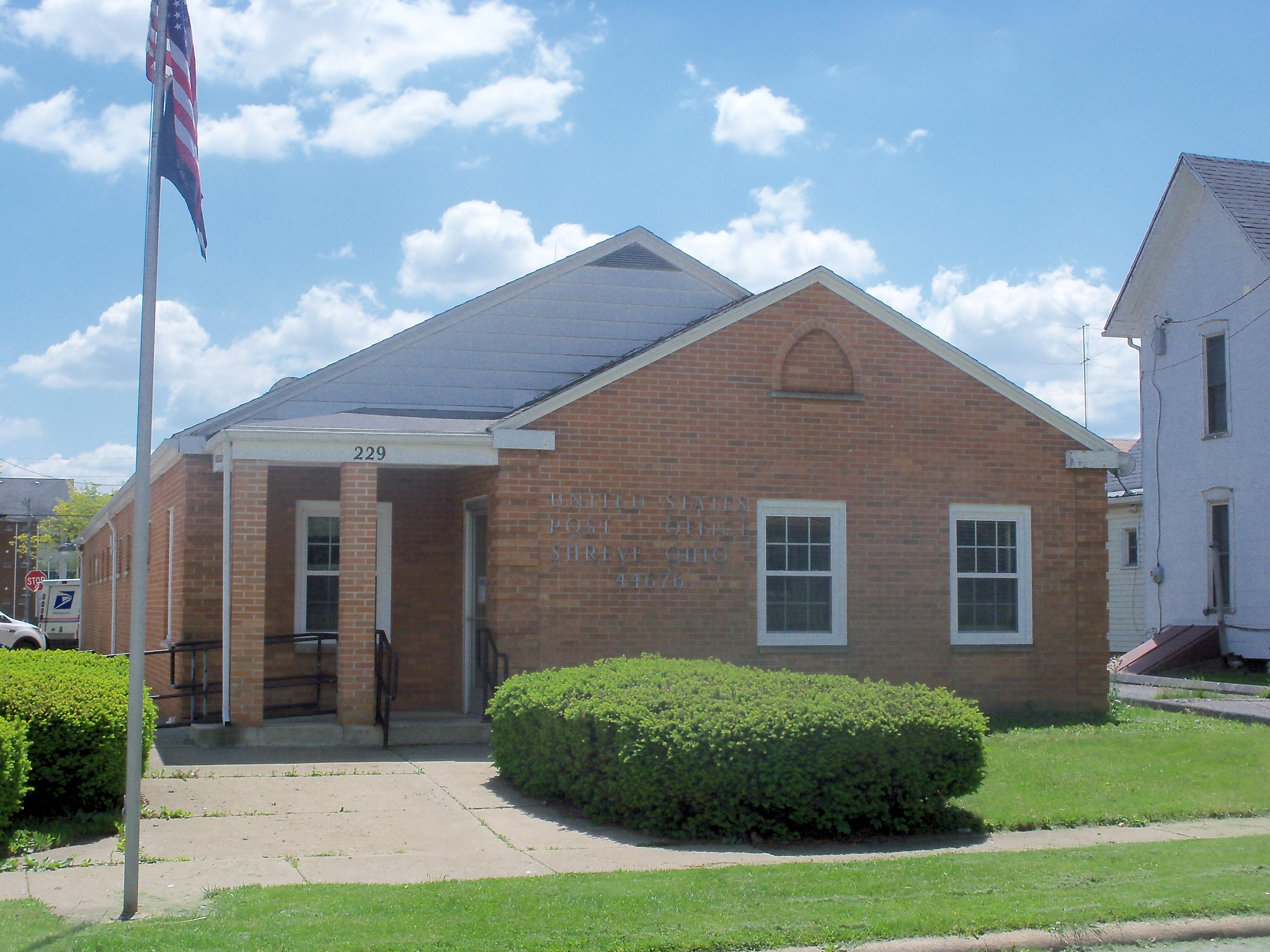
- Post Office

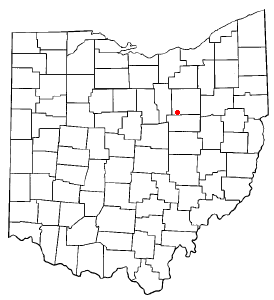
- Location of Shreve, Ohio

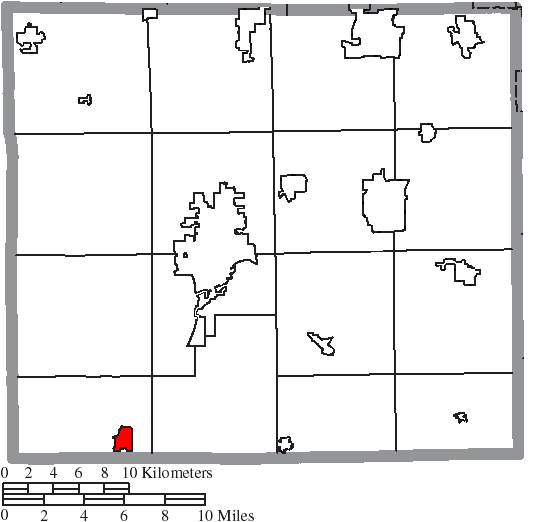
- Location of Shreve in Wayne County
- Coordinates: 40°40′53″N 82°01′18″W
- Country: United States
- State: Ohio
- County: Wayne
- Township: Clinton

Area
  - Total: 0.86 sq mi (2.24 km^{2})
  - Land: 0.86 sq mi (2.24 km^{2})
  - Water: 0 sq mi (0.00 km^{2})
- Elevation: 896 ft (273 m)

Population (2020)
  - Total: 1,497
  - Density: 1,730.4/sq mi (668.12/km^{2})
- Time zone: UTC-5 (Eastern (EST))
  - Summer (DST): UTC-4 (EDT)
- ZIP code: 44676
- Area code: 330
- FIPS code: 39-72396
- GNIS feature ID: 2399814
- Website: http://www.shreveohio.com/

Shreve is a village in Clinton Township, Wayne County, Ohio, United States. The population was 1,497 at the 2020 census. Shreve is served by a branch of the Wayne County Public Library.

== History ==
The village has the name of Thomas Shreve, the original owner of the town site.

== Geography ==
According to the United States Census Bureau, the village has a total area of 0.85 square miles (2.20 km^{2}), all of it land. It is, however, drained by Shreve Creek, a tributary to the Killbuck Creek. The Killbuck Marsh, locally known as Shreve Swamp, is located outside of the Village limits and part of the Killbuck Creek watershed.

== Demographics ==
Historical population
Census	Pop.	Note	%±
1870	479		—
1880	908		89.6%
1890	1,012		11.5%
1900	1,043		3.1%
1910	1,016		−2.6%
1920	1,094		7.7%
1930	1,103		0.8%
1940	1,113		0.9%
1950	1,287		15.6%
1960	1,617		25.6%
1970	1,635		1.1%
1980	1,608		−1.7%
1990	1,584		−1.5%
2000	1,582		−0.1%
2010	1,514		−4.3%
2020	1,497		−1.1%
U.S. Decennial Census

=== 2010 census ===
As of the census of 2010, there were 1,514 people, 608 households, and 407 families living in the village. The population density was 1,781.2 inhabitants per square mile (687.7/km^{2}). There were 688 housing units at an average density of 809.4 per square mile (312.5/km^{2}). The racial makeup of the village was 97.7% White, 0.2% African American, 0.1% Native American, 0.3% Asian, 0.1% Pacific Islander, 0.6% from other races, and 0.9% from two or more races. Hispanic or Latino of any race were 1.1% of the population.

There were 608 households, of which 36.7% had children under the age of 18 living with them, 44.7% were married couples living together, 16.1% had a female householder with no husband present, 6.1% had a male householder with no wife present, and 33.1% were non-families. 28.5% of all households were made up of individuals, and 11.7% had someone living alone who was 65 years of age or older. The average household size was 2.49 and the average family size was 3.00.

The median age in the village was 35.5 years. 27.9% of residents were under the age of 18; 8.7% were between the ages of 18 and 24; 24.5% were from 25 to 44; 26.2% were from 45 to 64; and 12.6% were 65 years of age or older. The gender makeup of the village was 48.1% male and 51.9% female.

=== 2000 census ===
As of the census of 2000, there were 1,582 people, 650 households, and 427 families living in the town. The population density was 1,870.3 inhabitants per square mile (722.1/km^{2}). There were 686 housing units at an average density of 811.0 per square mile (313.1/km^{2}). The racial makeup of the town was 98.48% White, 0.51% African American, 0.13% Native American, 0.13% Asian, 0.06% from other races, and 0.70% from two or more races. Hispanic or Latino of any race were 0.38% of the population.

There were 650 households, out of which 36.9% had children under the age of 18 living with them, 50.0% were married couples living together, 12.6% had a female householder with no husband present, and 34.2% were non-families. 31.5% of all households were made up of individuals, and 14.3% had someone living alone who was 65 years of age or older. The average household size was 2.43 and the average family size was 3.08.

In the village, the population was spread out, with 29.9% under the age of 18, 7.8% from 18 to 24, 30.0% from 25 to 44, 18.5% from 45 to 64, and 13.8% who were 65 years of age or older. The median age was 35 years. For every 100 females there were 90.8 males. For every 100 females age 18 and over, there were 84.2 males.

The median income for a household in the village was $32,708, and the median income for a family was $39,405. Males had a median income of $30,320 versus $21,384 for females. The per capita income for the village was $15,049. About 8.6% of families and 10.4% of the population were below the poverty line, including 10.1% of those under age 18 and 15.6% of those age 65 or over.

== Notable people ==
- Jim Carmichael, mayor of Shreve and Ohio state representative
- Catherine Dobbs, mayor of Barberton, Ohio (1956-1961); born in Shreve
