= Nashville, Ohio =

- Village
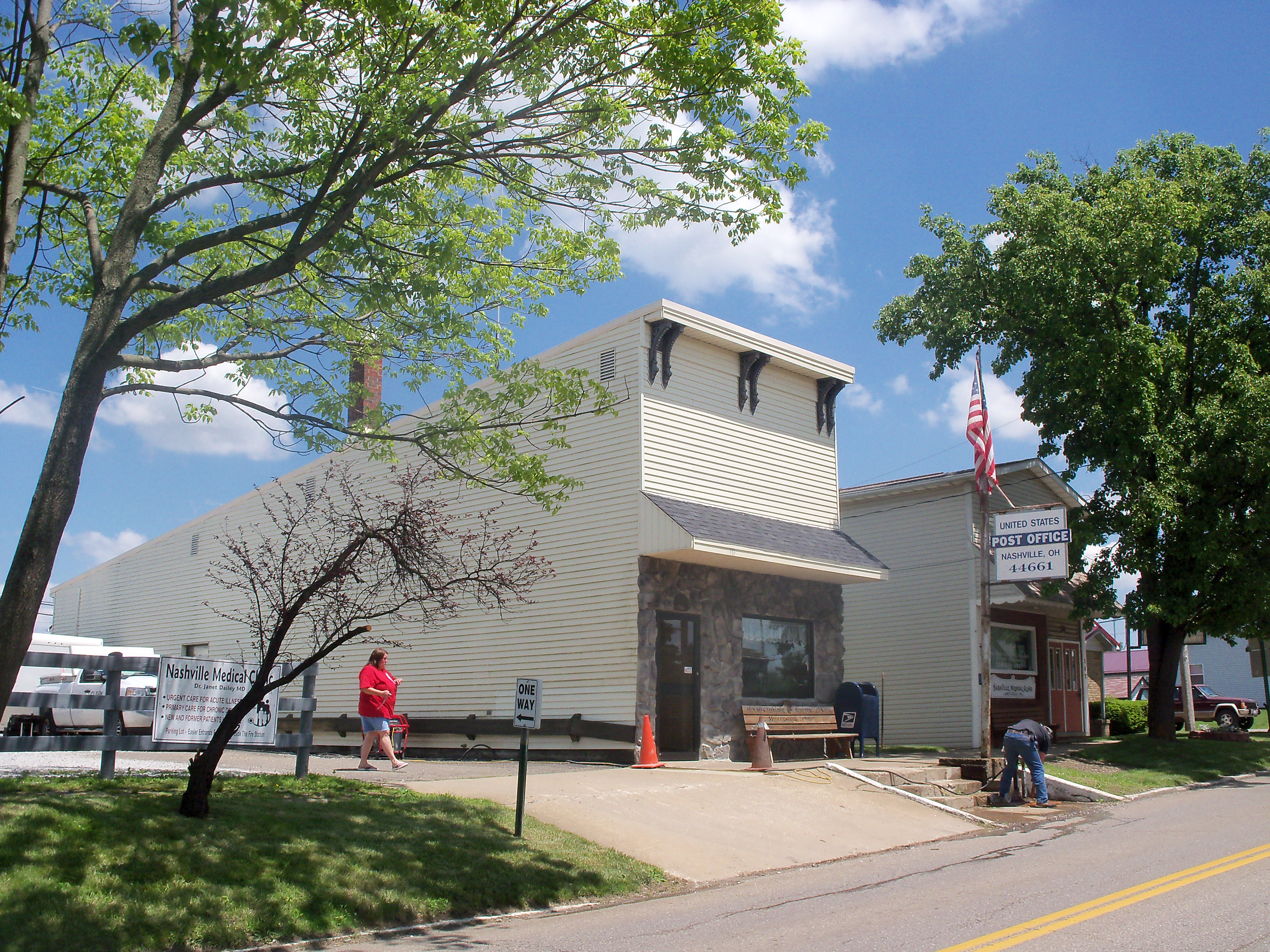
- Post Office

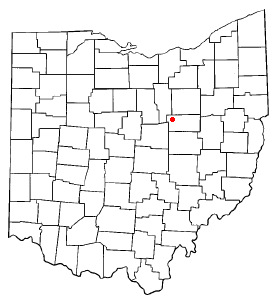
- Location of Nashville, Ohio

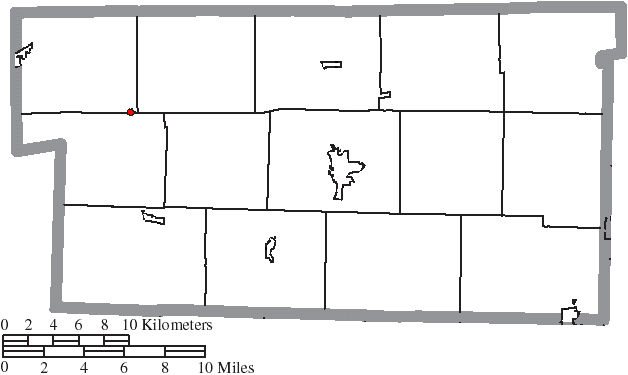
- Location of Nashville in Holmes County
- Coordinates: 40°35′45″N 82°06′47″W
- Country: United States
- State: Ohio
- County: Holmes

Area
  - Total: 0.069 sq mi (0.18 km^{2})
  - Land: 0.069 sq mi (0.18 km^{2})
  - Water: 0 sq mi (0.00 km^{2})
- Elevation: 1,224 ft (373 m)

Population (2020)
  - Total: 183
  - Density: 2,671.3/sq mi (1,031.39/km^{2})
- Time zone: UTC-5 (Eastern (EST))
  - Summer (DST): UTC-4 (EDT)
- ZIP code: 44661
- Area code: 330
- FIPS code: 39-53634
- GNIS feature ID: 2399437

Nashville is a village in Holmes County, Ohio, United States. The population was 183 at the 2020 census.

== History ==
In 1833, Nashville contained six houses and one tavern.

== Geography ==
According to the United States Census Bureau, the village has a total area of 0.08 square miles (0.21 km^{2}), all land.

== Demographics ==
Historical population
Census	Pop.	Note	%±
1870	208		—
1880	217		4.3%
1900	266		—
1910	268		0.8%
1920	211		−21.3%
1930	177		−16.1%
1940	200		13.0%
1950	234		17.0%
1960	234		0.0%
1970	221		−5.6%
1980	211		−4.5%
1990	181		−14.2%
2000	172		−5.0%
2010	197		14.5%
2020	183		−7.1%
U.S. Decennial Census

=== 2010 census ===
As of the census of 2010, there were 197 people, 76 households, and 57 families living in the village. The population density was 2,462.5 inhabitants per square mile (950.8/km^{2}). There were 91 housing units at an average density of 1,137.5 per square mile (439.2/km^{2}). The racial makeup of the village was 99.5% White and 0.5% from two or more races. Hispanic or Latino of any race were 0.5% of the population.

There were 76 households, of which 47.4% had children under the age of 18 living with them, 51.3% were married couples living together, 17.1% had a female householder with no husband present, 6.6% had a male householder with no wife present, and 25.0% were non-families. 22.4% of all households were made up of individuals, and 13.1% had someone living alone who was 65 years of age or older. The average household size was 2.59 and the average family size was 2.98.

The median age in the village was 28.9 years. 34% of residents were under the age of 18; 7.2% were between the ages of 18 and 24; 32% were from 25 to 44; 15.8% were from 45 to 64; and 11.2% were 65 years of age or older. The gender makeup of the village was 51.3% male and 48.7% female.

=== 2000 census ===
As of the census of 2000, there were 172 people, 68 households, and 45 families living in the village. The population density was 2,416.6 inhabitants per square mile (933.1/km^{2}). There were 80 housing units at an average density of 1,124.0 per square mile (434.0/km^{2}). The racial makeup of the village was 98.84% White, and 1.16% from two or more races. Hispanic or Latino of any race were 1.16% of the population.

There were 68 households, out of which 32.4% had children under the age of 18 living with them, 52.9% were married couples living together, 5.9% had a female householder with no husband present, and 32.4% were non-families. 30.9% of all households were made up of individuals, and 11.8% had someone living alone who was 65 years of age or older. The average household size was 2.53 and the average family size was 3.20.

In the village, the population was spread out, with 26.2% under the age of 18, 11.6% from 18 to 24, 24.4% from 25 to 44, 24.4% from 45 to 64, and 13.4% who were 65 years of age or older. The median age was 35 years. For every 100 females there were 115.0 males. For every 100 females age 18 and over, there were 108.2 males.

The median income for a household in the village was $34,375, and the median income for a family was $40,000. Males had a median income of $24,306 versus $22,813 for females. The per capita income for the village was $16,068. About 4.5% of families and 11.2% of the population were below the poverty line, including 29.4% of those under the age of eighteen and none of those 65 or over.
