= List of ghost towns in Ohio =

This is an incomplete list of ghost towns in Ohio.

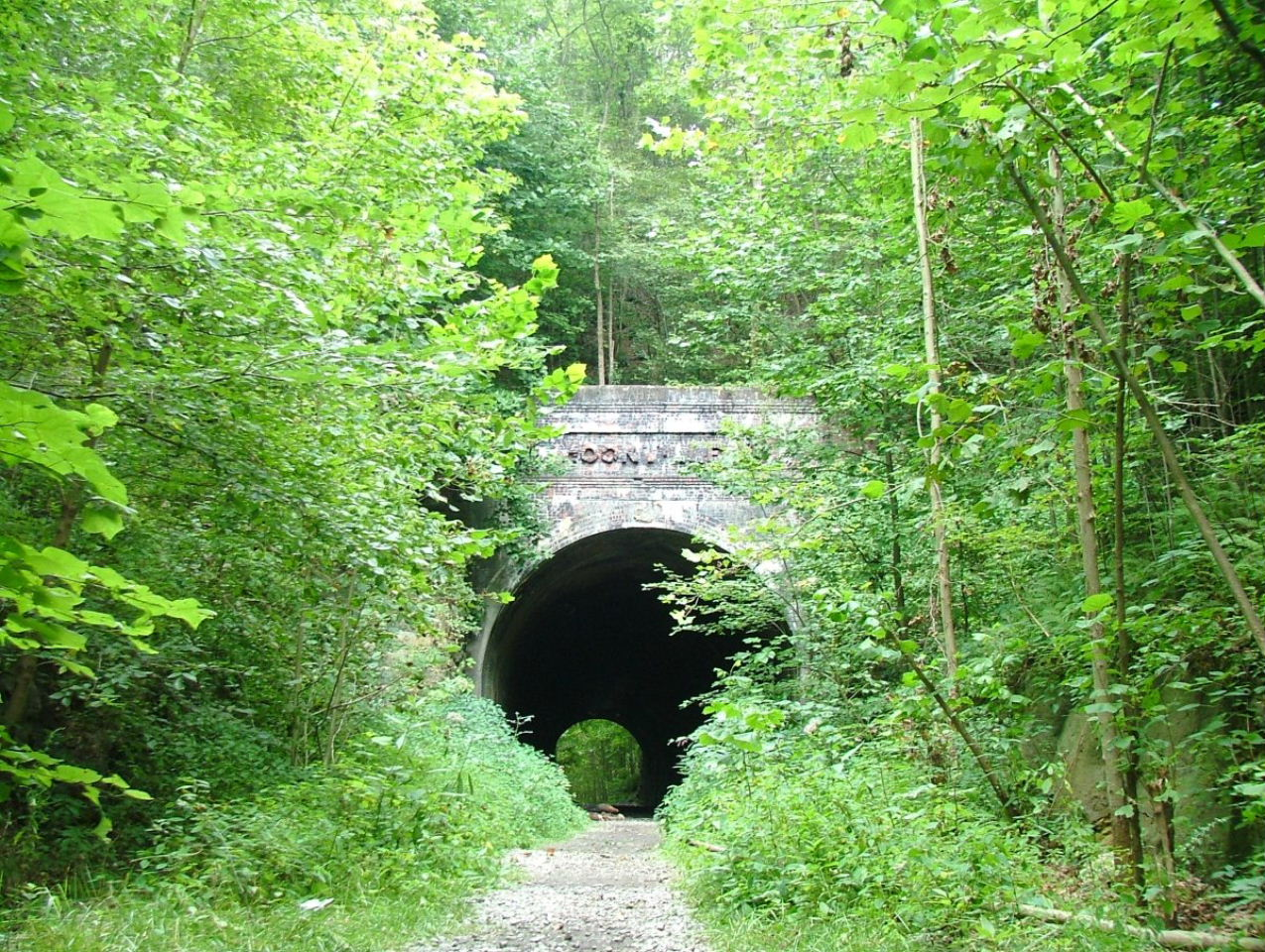
West entrance of the Moonville tunnel in Moonville, Ohio

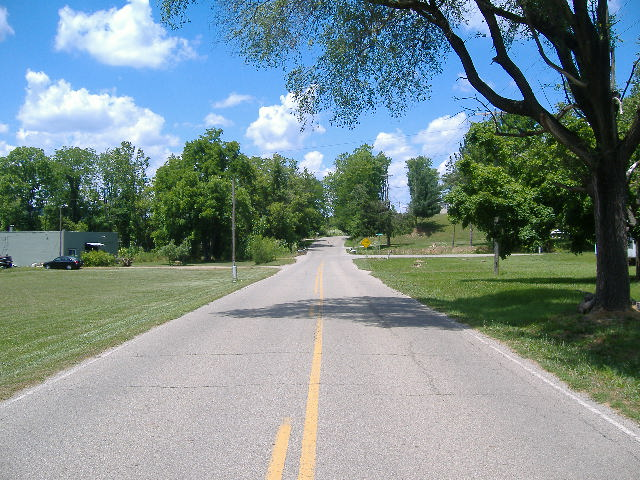
Intersection of Black Run Road and Shady Glen Road in Knockemstiff, Ohio

- Ai (Fulton County) - partially abandoned ghost city
- Airington (Morgan County) - village in Bristol Township
- Alba (Hancock County)
- Ashery (Hancock County) - small family town in Amanda Township
- Atwood (Carroll County) - small town in Carroll County. Abandoned to make way for Atwood Lake in effort to control flooding
- Atwood (Summit County) - small town in southern Summit County.
- Bakdwin (Paulding County) - small lumber town, slightly spills into Indiana
- Beagle (Hancock County) - small farming town
- Big Lick (Hancock County) - small town without notable buildings or businesses in Biglick Township
- Blanchard Bridge (Hancock County) - small town in Amanda Township
- Blowville
- Bakdwin (Paulding County) - small lumber town, slightly spills into Indiana
- (Boston) - also known as "Helltown"
- Cannonsburg (Hancock County) - small town in Union Township
- Capernaum (Hancock County) - small town named after biblical city in Amanda Township
- Cass (Hancock County) - small town in Cass Township
- Claylick, Licking County Located at the intersection of Claylick and the Licking River, this was one of the largest towns to be destroyed and caused primarily by 2 floods 1 in 1919 and 1 in 1959. After the 2nd flood the Dillon Dam floodplain project destroyed this town.
- Clements (Hancock County) - small town in Eagle and Jackson Township
- Cordelia (Hancock County) - small town in Orange Township, named Cordelta on some Railroad maps
- Crow (Hancock County) - small town in Marion Township
- Delaware Town, Ohio - is a ghost town in Coshocton County, Ohio
- El Rose (Hancock County) - small town in Orange Township with Rail station but not much business
- Elk Lick (Destroyed and flooded after construction of William H. Harsha Lake)
- Elm Grove (Hancock County) - small town in Marion Township
- Erwings Corner (Hancock County) - small town in Jackson Township
- Fallsville (Highland County)
- Frankford (Hancock County) - small town in Cass Township with 72 lots that were never sold
- Freedom (Hancock County) - small town in Biglick Township
- Galatea
- Hassan (Hasson) (Hancock County) - small town in Orange and Van Buren Township
- Hibernia
- Homer
- Huber (Hancock County) - small town on the Big Four Railroad in Marion Township
- Ingham
- Jamestown (Hancock County) - small town in Amanda Township
- Knockemstiff
- Lafayette (Hancock County) - small town in Portage Township
- Langan (Hancock County) - small town in Orange Township with a short-lived train station
- Lewisville (Hancock County) - small town in Blanchard Township
- Marion (Hancock County) - small town in Marion Township
- Martinstown (Martins Town) (Hancock County) - small town in Eagle, Jackson and Madison Township
- Marvins Mill (Hancock County) - small town in Marion Township
- Moffitt (Hancock County) - small town in Blanchard Township
- Moonville
- Moscow (Licking County)
- New Burlington (Clinton County)
- New Hampton
- Newville
- North Ridgeville (aka "North Ridge", "Pickens Corner", "Pickensville") (Hancock County) - small town in Marion Township
- Olney (Hancock County) - small town in Pleasant Township
- Oreton
- Providence
- Reed's Corner (Hancock County) - small town in Orange Township
- Revenge
- Rumley
- Rural Hill (Once thriving, died after local slaughter house, the main employer, closed its doors)
- San Toy
- Sprucevale (Canal town abandoned in 1870 with the closing of the canal, whose locks are still present)
- Tadmor
- Utopia
- Waterloo (Hancock County) - small town in Madison Township
- Weidlers (Hancock County) - small town in Marion Township
- West Union (Hancock County) - small town in Madison Township
- Willow Creek (Hancock County) - small town in Eagle Township
- Winchester
- Wineland (Hancock County) - small town in Cass Township
- Wonderland
