= Winchester, Richland County, Ohio =

Winchester, Ohio
- Ghost town
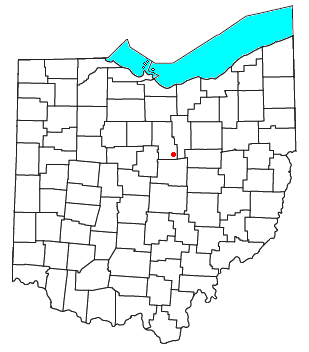
- Location of Winchester, Ohio
- Coordinates: 40°36′34″N 82°24′19″W
- Country: United States
- State: Ohio
- County: Richland
- Township: Worthington
- Time zone: UTC-5 (Eastern (EST))
  - Summer (DST): UTC-4 (EDT)
- GNIS feature ID: 1074385

Winchester is a ghost town in Worthington Township, Richland County, Ohio, United States, along the Clear Fork River. It was established south of Newville.

== History ==
In March 1845, the town of Winchester was laid out in Section 9, on the Clear Fork River by Noble Calhoun. A few houses were erected, but the land upon which it was platted was heavily mortgaged and was later sold at a Sheriff's sale. The town never amounted to more than a few homes.
