= List of ghost towns in Franklin County, Ohio =

This is an incomplete list of ghost towns in Franklin County, Ohio.

== Evanston ==
Evanston was a town located at North Broadway and the railroad near Clintonville, Columbus, Ohio, hence its alternate name, North Broadway.

== Five Mile Siding ==
Five Mile Siding was a railroad stop and small town located near the Blendon Township/Mifflin Township line.

== Hibernia ==
Hibernia was a town along Big Walnut Creek. Today, all that remains is the cemetery, and an apartment complex that bears its name.

== Olentangy Station ==
Olentangy Station was a town along the Hocking Valley Railroad in Clinton Township.

== Park's Mill ==
Park's Mill was a town in Mifflin Township, around where Sunbury Road and McCutcheon Road are today, with a post office having been there from 1851 to 1853.

== Pinhook ==
Pinhook was a town at the intersection of Dublin-Granville Road and Columbus-Central College Pike, now known as Sunbury Road, in Blendon Township, next to Big Walnut Creek.

== Seagrove ==
Seagrove is a historic ghost neighborhood of Columbus, Ohio. Existing prior to 1872, the neighborhood is situated in what was then southern Clinton Township, at Lisle Avenue (Kenny Road) and Lane Avenue. Today, it is mainly overrun by warehouses, with a few buildings older than 1962 still existing. It was also known as Lanevue and Lane Avenue at one point.

== Shattucksburg ==
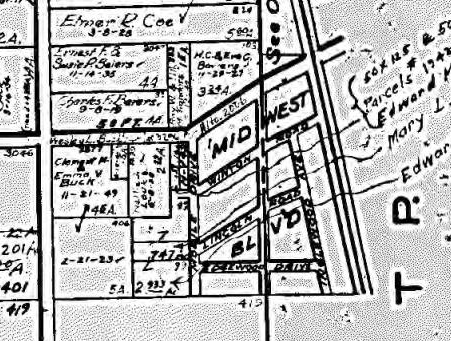
Shattucksburg in 1950

Shattucksburg was first created when Simon Shattuck sold some of his land off into some plots. The town lasted for many years, and disappeared in the 1970s.

Shattucksburg was founded somewhere before 1856. Shattucksburg was along what was then Henderson Road, now DeSantis Court and Old Henderson Road, where it met Kenny Road. The town was not meant to truly become a town; however, with the railroad being put through town in the mid-1800s, it did, and between 1910 and 1927, the town grew to have six streets, not including Henderson Road. The six streets were Mobile Drive, Midwest Drive, Inglewood Avenue, Winton Road, Lincoln Road, and Edgewood Drive. The town began to disappear from maps in the 1970s, one of the last maps showing the town as a whole was the 1960 Census Tract Map of Franklin County. The town had disappeared from maps for the most part by 1974, with Winton Road and Mobile Drive as exceptions. The last original roads remaining as of 2016 are Mobile Drive, Henderson Road (now Old Henderson Road), Midwest Drive, and a property line/grass strip between a Weight Watchers center and a Wolfe Sons Heating & Cooling warehouse, marking where Winton Road was. Currently, the former land of the town consists of mostly industrial buildings, including Evans Adhesive, Dale Cleaners, and a museum of trains, called The Depot. A secondary name for the area currently is Midwest Boulevard, even though there is no Midwest Boulevard, only a Midwest Drive. This error of the nickname "Midwest Boulevard" is shown on the map in the infobox.

== Sullivant ==
Sullivant was a town named after Lucas Sullivant.

== Thomas Lane neighborhood ==
This neighborhood was mainly inhabited by the Bacons, and followed a small road named Thomas Lane. It was platted between 1872 and 1910. Thomas Lane exists today, but no longer crosses the railroad and is suburbanized.

== Wonderland ==
Wonderland was a town at Hamilton Road and I-270. It was bought out by the airport.

== See also ==
- List of ghost towns in Ohio
- Neighborhoods in Columbus, Ohio
