= College Township, Ohio =

Township in Ohio, US

College Township, Knox County, Ohio
- Township
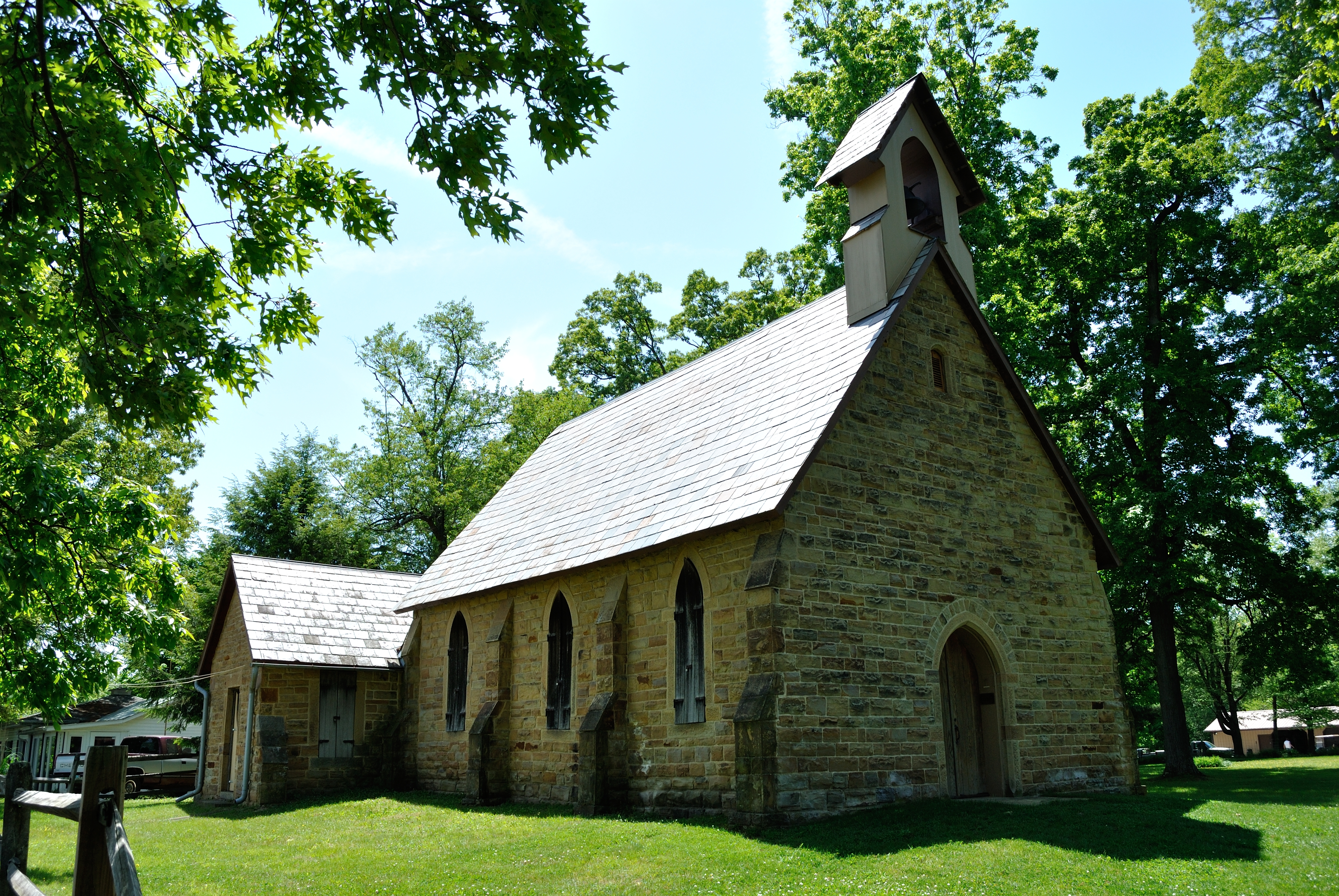
- Christ Church at the Quarry

- Location of College Township in Knox County.
- Coordinates: 40°22′30″N 82°23′45″W
- Country: United States
- State: Ohio
- County: Knox

Area
  - Total: 6.4 sq mi (16.6 km^{2})
  - Land: 6.4 sq mi (16.6 km^{2})
  - Water: 0 sq mi (0.0 km^{2})
- Elevation: 1,056 ft (322 m)

Population (2020)
  - Total: 2,553
  - Density: 398/sq mi (154/km^{2})
- Time zone: UTC-5 (Eastern (EST))
  - Summer (DST): UTC-4 (EDT)
- FIPS code: 39-16686
- GNIS feature ID: 1086396
- Website: https://www.collegetownshipoh.com/

College Township is one of the twenty-two townships of Knox County, Ohio, United States. The 2020 census found 2,553 people in the township.

== Geography ==
Located in the central part of the county, it borders the following townships:

- Monroe Township - north
- Howard Township - northeast corner
- Harrison Township - east
- Pleasant Township - south and west

The village of Gambier is located in central College Township.

== Name and history ==
College Township was established in 1838. It was named for Kenyon College in Gambier.

It is the only College Township statewide.

== Government ==
The township is governed by a three-member board of trustees, who are elected in November of odd-numbered years to a four-year term beginning on the following January 1. Two are elected in the year after the presidential election and one is elected in the year before it. There is also an elected township fiscal officer, who serves a four-year term beginning on April 1 of the year after the election, which is held in November of the year before the presidential election. Vacancies in the fiscal officership or on the board of trustees are filled by the remaining trustees.
