= Apple Valley, Ohio =

- Census-designated place
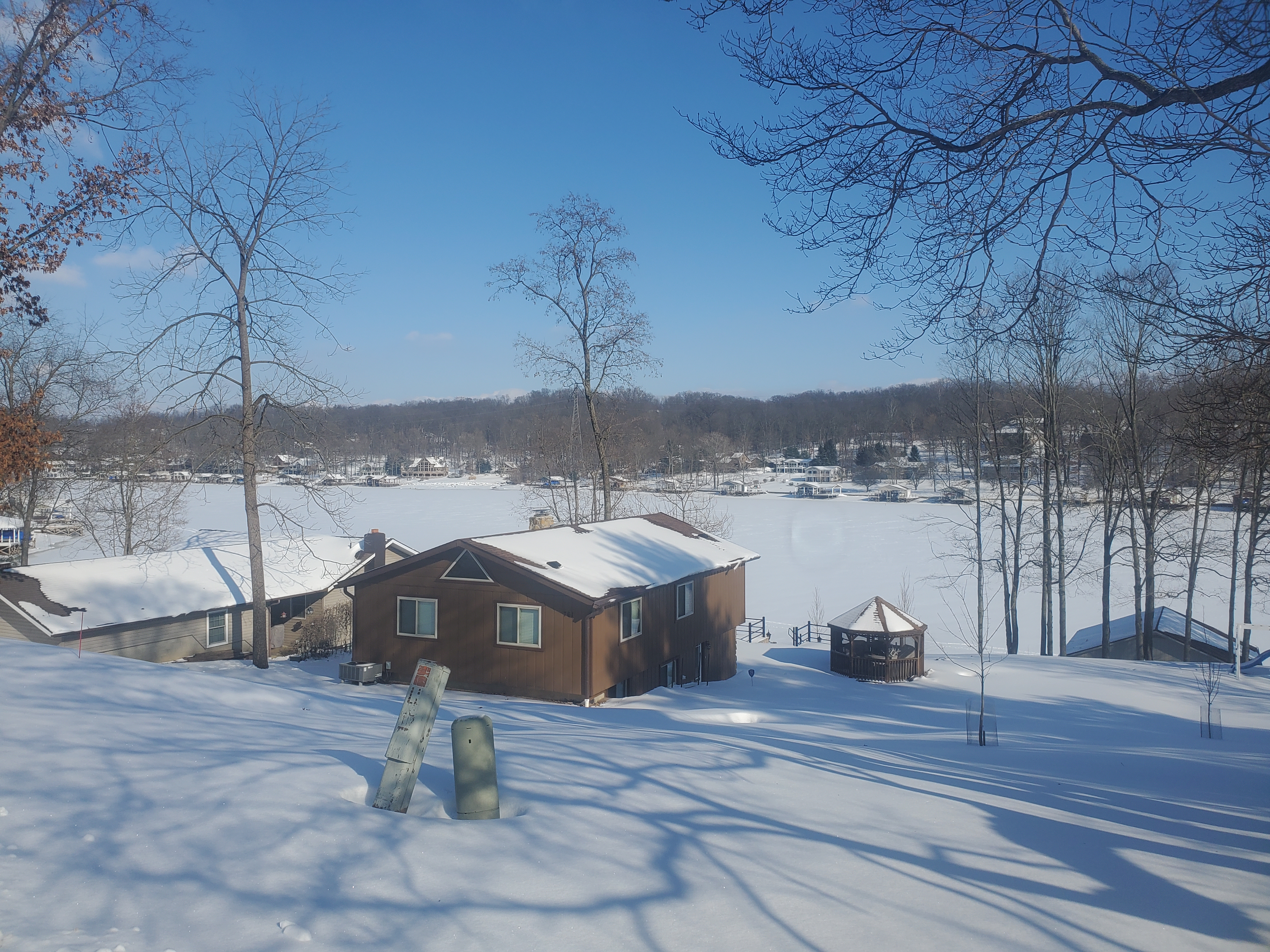
- Apple Valley in 2024

- Location within Ohio Location within the United States
- Coordinates: 40°26′20″N 82°21′14″W
- Country: United States
- State: Ohio
- County: Knox
- Townships: Howard, Brown

Area
  - Total: 6.81 sq mi (17.63 km^{2})
  - Land: 6.01 sq mi (15.57 km^{2})
  - Water: 0.80 sq mi (2.06 km^{2})
- Elevation: 1,140 ft (350 m)

Population (2020)
  - Total: 5,352
  - Density: 890.3/sq mi (343.73/km^{2})
- Time zone: UTC-5 (Eastern (EST))
  - Summer (DST): UTC-4 (EDT)
- ZIP code: 43028
- Area code: 740
- FIPS code: 39-02266
- GNIS feature ID: 2628858

Apple Valley is a census-designated place (CDP) in Knox County, in the U.S. state of Ohio. It consists of a planned community surrounding a 511-acre (2.07 km^{2}) reservoir named Apple Valley Lake. As of the 2020 census, the CDP had a population of 5,352.

Primarily a resort community, Apple Valley contains a golf course.

== Demographics ==
Historical population
Census	Pop.	Note	%±
2020	5,352		—
U.S. Decennial Census

Apple Valley first appeared as a census designated place in the 2020 U.S. census.
