= Green Township, Ashland County, Ohio =

Township in Ohio, US

Green Township, Ohio
- Township
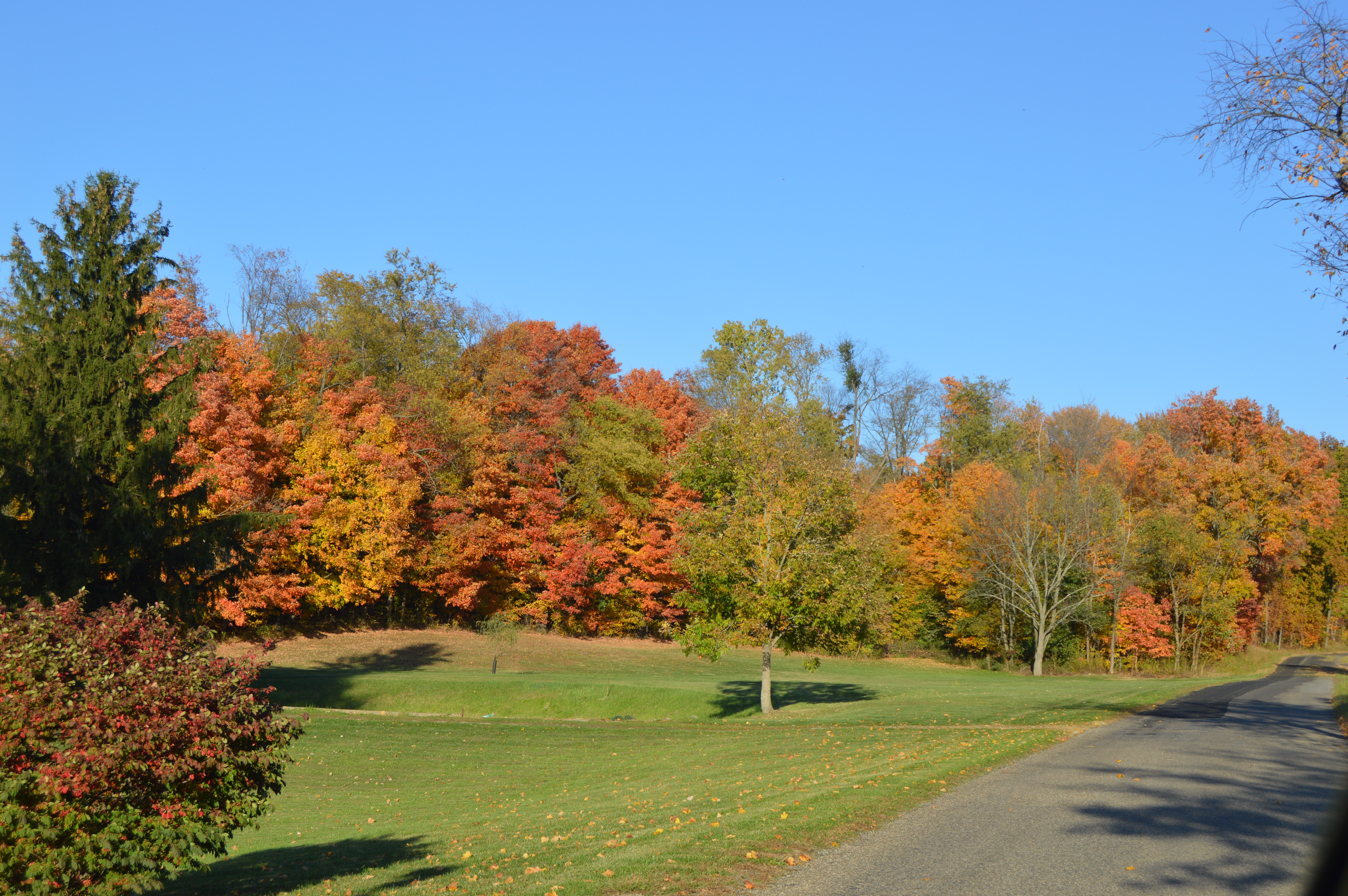
- Autumn scene in the township's far northwest

- Logo

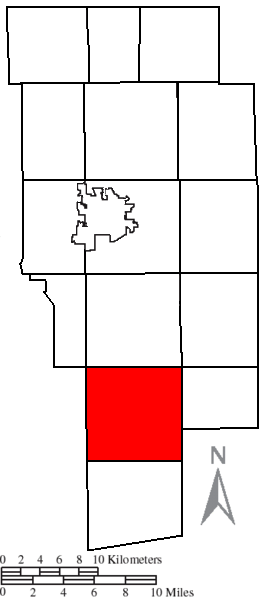
- Location of Green Township in Ashland County
- Coordinates: 40°39′44″N 82°17′8″W
- Country: United States
- State: Ohio
- County: Ashland

Area
  - Total: 37.6 sq mi (97.4 km^{2})
  - Land: 37.3 sq mi (96.5 km^{2})
  - Water: 0.39 sq mi (1.0 km^{2})
- Elevation: 955 ft (291 m)

Population (2020)
  - Total: 3,676
  - Density: 110/sq mi (41/km^{2})
- Time zone: UTC-5 (Eastern (EST))
  - Summer (DST): UTC-4 (EDT)
- FIPS code: 39-31682
- GNIS feature ID: 1085704
- Website: www.greentwp.us

Green Township is one of the fifteen townships of Ashland County, Ohio, United States. The population was 3,676 at the 2020 census.

== Geography ==
Located in the southern part of the county, it borders the following townships:

- Vermillion Township - north
- Mohican Township - northeast corner
- Lake Township - east
- Washington Township, Holmes County - southeast
- Hanover Township - south
- Worthington Township, Richland County - southwest corner
- Monroe Township, Richland County - west
- Mifflin Township - northwest corner

Two villages are located in Green Township: part of Loudonville in the southeast, and Perrysville in the southwest.

== Name and history ==
Green Township began as a part of Richland County in 1806. The name first appears in maps and records in the 1820s following settlement of the township about 1818. It was separated to become a part of Ashland County upon its formation in 1846. It is one of sixteen Green Townships statewide.

== Government ==
The township is governed by a three-member board of trustees, who are elected in November of odd-numbered years to a four-year term beginning on the following January 1. Two are elected in the year after the presidential election and one is elected in the year before it. There is also an elected township fiscal officer, who serves a four-year term beginning on April 1 of the year after the election, which is held in November of the year before the presidential election. Vacancies in the fiscal officership or on the board of trustees are filled by the remaining trustees.
