= Monroe Township, Knox County, Ohio =

Township in Ohio, US

Monroe Township, Knox County Ohio
- Township
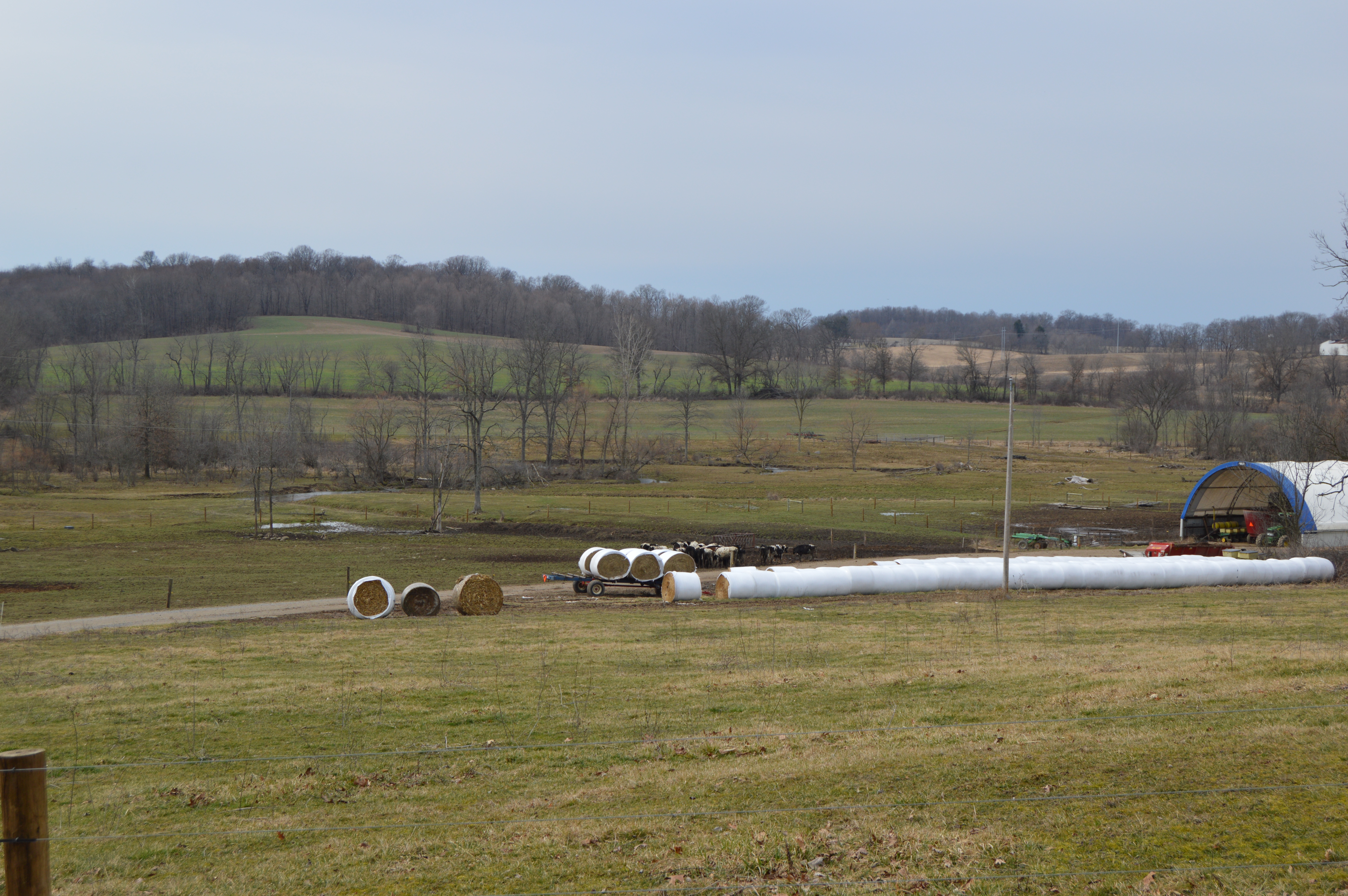
- Dairy farm on North Liberty Road in the township's northwest

- Location of Monroe Township in Knox County.
- Coordinates: 40°25′38″N 82°24′56″W
- Country: United States
- State: Ohio
- County: Knox

Area
  - Total: 24.4 sq mi (63.1 km^{2})
  - Land: 24.4 sq mi (63.1 km^{2})
  - Water: 0 sq mi (0.0 km^{2})
- Elevation: 1,201 ft (366 m)

Population (2020)
  - Total: 2,339
  - Density: 96.0/sq mi (37.1/km^{2})
- Time zone: UTC-5 (Eastern (EST))
  - Summer (DST): UTC-4 (EDT)
- FIPS code: 39-51436
- GNIS feature ID: 1086407

Monroe Township is one of the twenty-two townships of Knox County, Ohio, United States. The 2020 census found 2,339 people in the township.

== Geography ==
Located in the center of the county, it borders the following townships:

- Pike Township - north
- Brown Township - northeast corner
- Howard Township - east
- Harrison Township - southeast corner, east of College Township
- College Township - southeast, west of Harrison Township
- Pleasant Township - southwest, east of Clinton Township
- Clinton Township - southwest, west of Pleasant Township
- Morris Township - west

Part of the city of Mount Vernon, the county seat of Knox County, is located in southwestern Monroe Township.

== Name and history ==
Monroe Township was established in 1825. It is named for James Monroe, fifth President of the United States.

It is one of twenty-two Monroe Townships statewide.

By the 1830s, Monroe Township had a number of productive mills built along Schenck Creek.

== Government ==
The township is governed by a three-member board of trustees, who are elected in November of odd-numbered years to a four-year term beginning on the following January 1. Two are elected in the year after the presidential election and one is elected in the year before it. There is also an elected township fiscal officer, who serves a four-year term beginning on April 1 of the year after the election, which is held in November of the year before the presidential election. Vacancies in the fiscal officership or on the board of trustees are filled by the remaining trustees.
