= West Jefferson, Ohio =

- Village
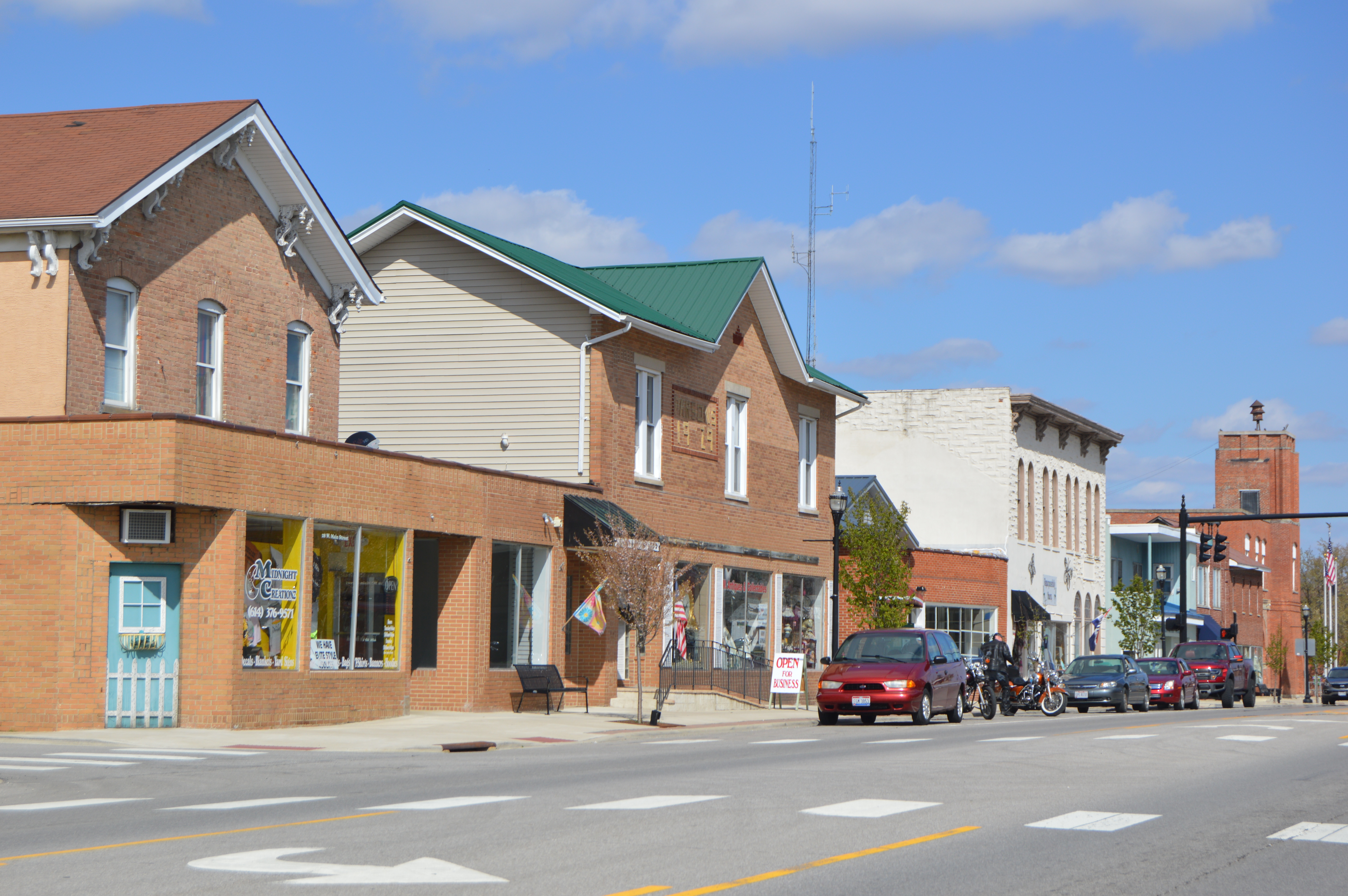
- Main Street

- Flag Logo

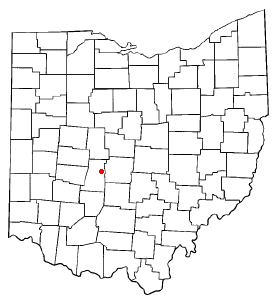
- Location of West Jefferson, Ohio

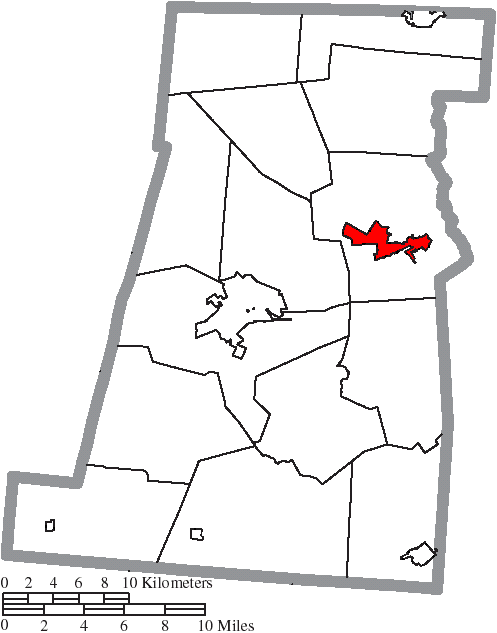
- Location of West Jefferson in Madison County
- Coordinates: 39°56′48″N 83°18′23″W
- Country: United States
- State: Ohio
- County: Madison
- Townships: Jefferson, Deer Creek

Area
  - Total: 9.94 sq mi (25.74 km^{2})
  - Land: 9.92 sq mi (25.69 km^{2})
  - Water: 0.019 sq mi (0.05 km^{2})
- Elevation: 971 ft (296 m)

Population (2020)
  - Total: 4,137
  - Density: 417.1/sq mi (161.04/km^{2})
- Time zone: UTC-5 (Eastern (EST))
  - Summer (DST): UTC-4 (EDT)
- ZIP Codes: 43162 (West Jefferson); 43119 (Galloway); 43140 (London)
- Area code: 614
- FIPS code: 39-83580
- GNIS feature ID: 2400132
- Website: www.westjeffersonohio.gov

West Jefferson (established 1834) is a village in Madison County, Ohio, United States. The population was 4,137 at the 2020 census. Located along U.S. Route 40, the village has a fairly close relationship with the surrounding township. West Jefferson boasts many amenities, such as three parks, a municipal swimming pool, a public library (Hurt/Battelle Memorial Library), and a commerce park (Park 70 at West Jefferson).

== History ==
=== Overview ===
West Jefferson, founded by Isaac Jones, was originally called New Hampton (founded by Samuel Jones and Samuel Sexton). The current name was platted c. 1831. A post office called West Jefferson has been in operation since 1833. In the same year, the town of "Jefferson" (later changed to avoid confusion with Jefferson, Ohio) was first documented and established. The village was established on April 24, 1834.

=== Early settlement ===
On July 5, 1822, (recorded by Justice A. Burnham on July 13), a settlement named 'New Hampton' was established, about one mile (1.6 km) south of the current town site. On September 13, 1830, the first map of the town's plots was drawn up by Rev. Isaac Jones, one of the first settlers aside from (Samuel) Jones and Sexton, and a prominent citizen of West Jefferson. Around 1848-1849, the Columbus and Xenia railroad raised $20,000 from the citizens of Madison County to build a railroad. The original railroad station and its surrounding structures no longer exist. As of 2025, the railway is owned and operated by Norfolk Southern Railway.

The Ss. Simon and Jude church was constructed in 1869.

=== 1870–1910 ===
In 1872, the first records of a town seal were recorded. The seal had a copy of the original covered bridge spanning Little Darby Creek on the National road (now known as U.S. Route 40). Also in 1872, West Street was paved with brick.

=== 2021 Shooting ===
On May 24, 2021, a mass shooting occurred at an apartment complex in West Jefferson. Three men and one woman were killed, with three of the victims being found inside the building and one outside. A motive has not been determined for the shooting. On June 14, a 35-year-old suspect was arrested and charged with the killings. The shooting marked West Jefferson's first homicides since April 2012. In February 2024, the shooter, John Steckel, was convicted of four counts of aggravated murder for the shooting and was sentenced to life without parole.

=== 2024 Shooting ===
On Monday, May 13, 2024, 22-year-old Ali Hamsa Yusuf fired at least one shot inside an Amazon warehouse facility in West Jefferson. Yusuf, a security guard, was employed by a third party contractor and was assigned to the facility. At 4:45 PM, Yusuf fired a shot inside the Amazon building, damaging the inside. He then threatened 911 callers before leaving the building and fleeing the scene. The Columbus Police Department (CPD) found Yusuf on Hall Road in Columbus, where he ended up shooting a CPD Officer. Columbus Police Officers returned fire, striking Yusuf. He was transported to Doctors West Hospital, where he was then pronounced dead at 6:57 P.M.

== Geography ==
According to the United States Census Bureau, the village has a total area of 4.87 square miles (12.61 km^{2}), of which 4.85 square miles (12.56 km^{2}) is land and 0.02 square miles (0.05 km^{2}) is water. Within Jefferson Township (the township in which West Jefferson inhabits), there are two major creeks which run through it: Little Darby creek, a tributary of Big Darby Creek, and later the Scioto River and Big Darby Creek itself, which runs along part of the eastern border with Franklin county.

== Demographics ==
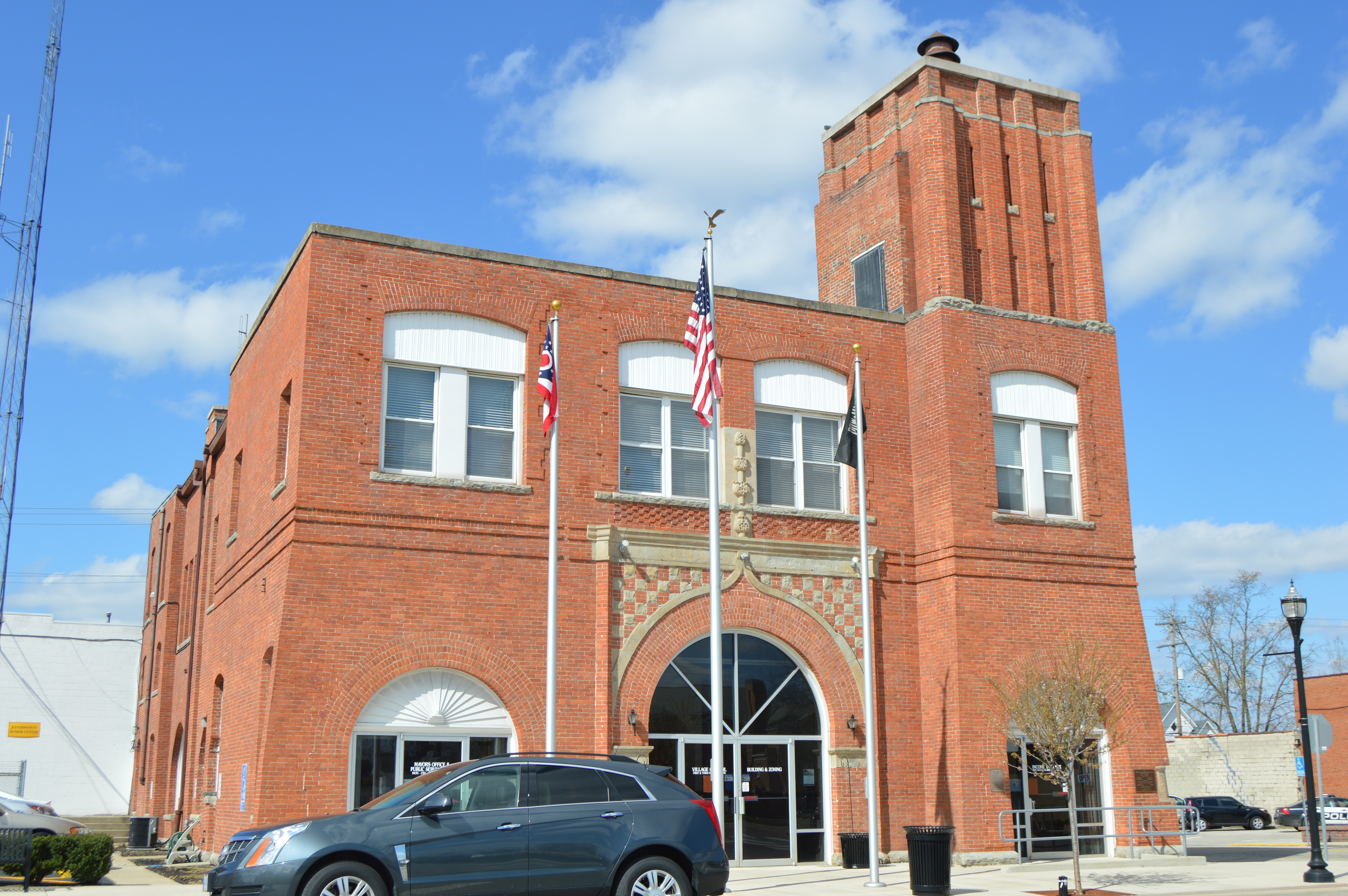
West Jefferson Village Hall

Historical population
Census	Pop.	Note	%±
1850	436		—
1860	460		5.5%
1880	720		—
1890	778		8.1%
1900	803		3.2%
1910	1,043		29.9%
1920	1,170		12.2%
1930	1,376		17.6%
1940	1,386		0.7%
1950	1,647		18.8%
1960	2,774		68.4%
1970	3,664		32.1%
1980	4,448		21.4%
1990	4,505		1.3%
2000	4,331		−3.9%
2010	4,222		−2.5%
2020	4,137		−2.0%
U.S. Decennial Census

=== 2020 census ===
As of the 2020 census, West Jefferson had a population of 4,137. The median age was 40.7 years. 23.0% of residents were under the age of 18 and 19.4% of residents were 65 years of age or older. For every 100 females there were 90.4 males, and for every 100 females age 18 and over there were 87.3 males age 18 and over.

93.2% of residents lived in urban areas, while 6.8% lived in rural areas.

There were 1,679 households in West Jefferson, of which 30.6% had children under the age of 18 living in them. Of all households, 44.4% were married-couple households, 17.0% were households with a male householder and no spouse or partner present, and 28.2% were households with a female householder and no spouse or partner present. About 28.1% of all households were made up of individuals and 13.0% had someone living alone who was 65 years of age or older.

There were 1,737 housing units, of which 3.3% were vacant. The homeowner vacancy rate was 1.1% and the rental vacancy rate was 3.4%.

Racial composition as of the 2020 census
Race	Number	Percent
White	3,888	94.0%
Black or African American	30	0.7%
American Indian and Alaska Native	3	0.1%
Asian	20	0.5%
Native Hawaiian and Other Pacific Islander	0	0.0%
Some other race	16	0.4%
Two or more races	180	4.4%
Hispanic or Latino (of any race)	68	1.6%

=== 2010 census ===
As of the census of 2010, there were 4,222 people, 1,617 households, and 1,149 families residing in the village. The population density was 870.5 inhabitants per square mile (336.1/km^{2}). There were 1,709 housing units at an average density of 352.4 per square mile (136.1/km^{2}). The racial makeup of the village was 97.6% White, 0.5% African American, 0.3% Asian, 0.2% from other races, and 1.4% from two or more races. Hispanic or Latino of any race were 0.9% of the population.

There were 1,617 households, of which 35.4% had children under the age of 18 living with them, 51.3% were married couples living together, 13.7% had a female householder with no husband present, 6.1% had a male householder with no wife present, and 28.9% were non-families. 25.7% of all households were made up of individuals, and 11.4% had someone living alone who was 65 years of age or older. The average household size was 2.55 and the average family size was 3.02.

The median age in the village was 38.5 years. 25.5% of residents were under the age of 18; 7.9% were between the ages of 18 and 24; 25.4% were from 25 to 44; 25.6% were from 45 to 64; and 15.6% were 65 years of age or older. The gender makeup of the village was 48.9% male and 51.1% female.

=== 2000 census ===
As of the census of 2000, there were 4,331 people, 1,631 households, and 1,180 families residing in the village. The population density was 1,306.0 inhabitants per square mile (504.2/km^{2}). There were 1,704 housing units at an average density of 513.8 per square mile (198.4/km^{2}). The racial makeup of the village was 99.01% White, 0.02% African American, 0.16% Native American, 0.14% Asian, 0.02% Pacific Islander, 0.09% from other races, and 0.55% from two or more races. Hispanic or Latino of any race were 0.58% of the population.

There were 1,631 households, out of which 36.7% had children under the age of 18 living with them, 56.5% were married couples living together, 11.1% had a female householder with no husband present, and 27.6% were non-families. 22.6% of all households were made up of individuals, and 9.6% had someone living alone who was 65 years of age or older. The average household size was 2.60 and the average family size was 3.07.

In the village, the population was spread out, with 27.4% under the age of 18, 7.9% from 18 to 24, 29.5% from 25 to 44, 21.9% from 45 to 64, and 13.4% who were 65 years of age or older. The median age was 35 years. For every 100 females there were 95.4 males. For every 100 females age 18 and over, there were 90.7 males.

The median income for a household in the village was $41,949, and the median income for a family was $50,046. Males had a median income of $36,073 versus $26,734 for females. The per capita income for the village was $20,425. About 6.1% of families and 5.9% of the population were below the poverty line, including 7.6% of those under age 18 and 6.5% of those age 65 or over.

== Library ==
West Jefferson is served by the Hurt/Battelle Memorial Library. In 2005, the library loaned more than 81,000 items to its 9,500 cardholders. Total holdings are over 57,000 volumes with over 60 periodical subscriptions.

== Parks ==
West Jefferson has three different parks: Garrette Park, Westwood Park, and Converse Park.

Currently, Converse Park is undergoing a multi-year renovation project set to enhance the park's amenities. Sometime around 2022, Garrette Park underwent remodeling to replace old playground equipment. In 2023, Westwood park was renovated. New playground equipment, an obstacle course, and new basketball courts were added.

Every year in December, Garrette Park is lit up with thousands of Christmas lights. This is known as Christmas in the Park.

== Notable people ==
- Richard Bradfield, agronomist
- Caleb Ferguson, baseball pitcher
- Jane Reece, photographer
- Ed Smith, basketball player

== See also ==
- New Hampton, Ohio
