= Brown Township, Knox County, Ohio =

Township in Ohio, US

Brown Township, Knox County Ohio
- Township
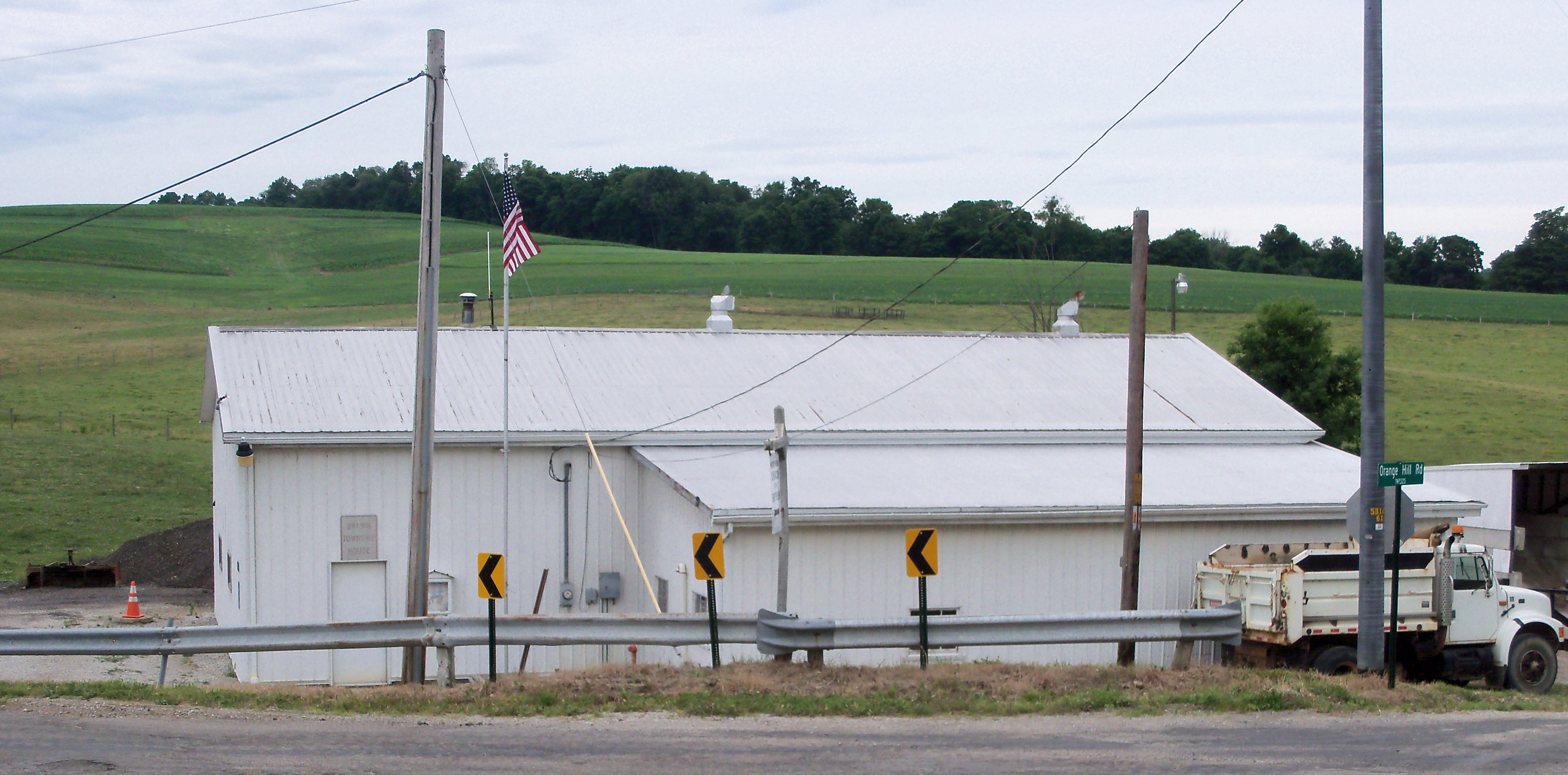
- Brown Township House

- Location of Brown Township in Knox County.
- Coordinates: 40°30′23″N 82°19′5″W
- Country: United States
- State: Ohio
- County: Knox

Area
  - Total: 30.0 sq mi (77.7 km^{2})
  - Land: 30.0 sq mi (77.7 km^{2})
  - Water: 0 sq mi (0.0 km^{2})
- Elevation: 1,053 ft (321 m)

Population (2020)
  - Total: 2,048
  - Density: 68.3/sq mi (26.4/km^{2})
- Time zone: UTC-5 (Eastern (EST))
  - Summer (DST): UTC-4 (EDT)
- FIPS code: 39-09470
- GNIS feature ID: 1086392

Historical population
Census	Pop.	Note	%±
1990	1,019		—
2000	1,425		39.8%
2010	1,862		30.7%
2020	2,048		10.0%
2024 (est.)	2,130		4.0%
U.S. Census:

Brown Township is one of twenty-two townships of Knox County, Ohio, United States. The 2020 census found 2,048 people in the township.

== Geography ==
Located in the northern part of the county, it borders the following townships:

- Hanover Township, Ashland County - north
- Jefferson Township - east
- Union Township - southeast
- Howard Township - south
- Monroe Township - southwest corner
- Pike Township - west
- Worthington Township, Richland County - northwest

No municipalities are located in Brown Township, although the census-designated place of Apple Valley lies partly within the township.

== Name and history ==
Brown Township was established in 1826. It is named for Major General Jacob Brown, of War of 1812 fame.

It is one of eight Brown Townships statewide.

== Government ==
The township is governed by a three-member board of trustees, who are elected in November of odd-numbered years to a four-year term beginning on the following January 1. Two are elected in the year after the presidential election and one is elected in the year before it. There is also an elected township fiscal officer, who serves a four-year term beginning on April 1 of the year after the election, which is held in November of the year before the presidential election. Vacancies in the fiscal officership or on the board of trustees are filled by the remaining trustees.
