= Union Township, Knox County, Ohio =

Township in Ohio, US

- Township
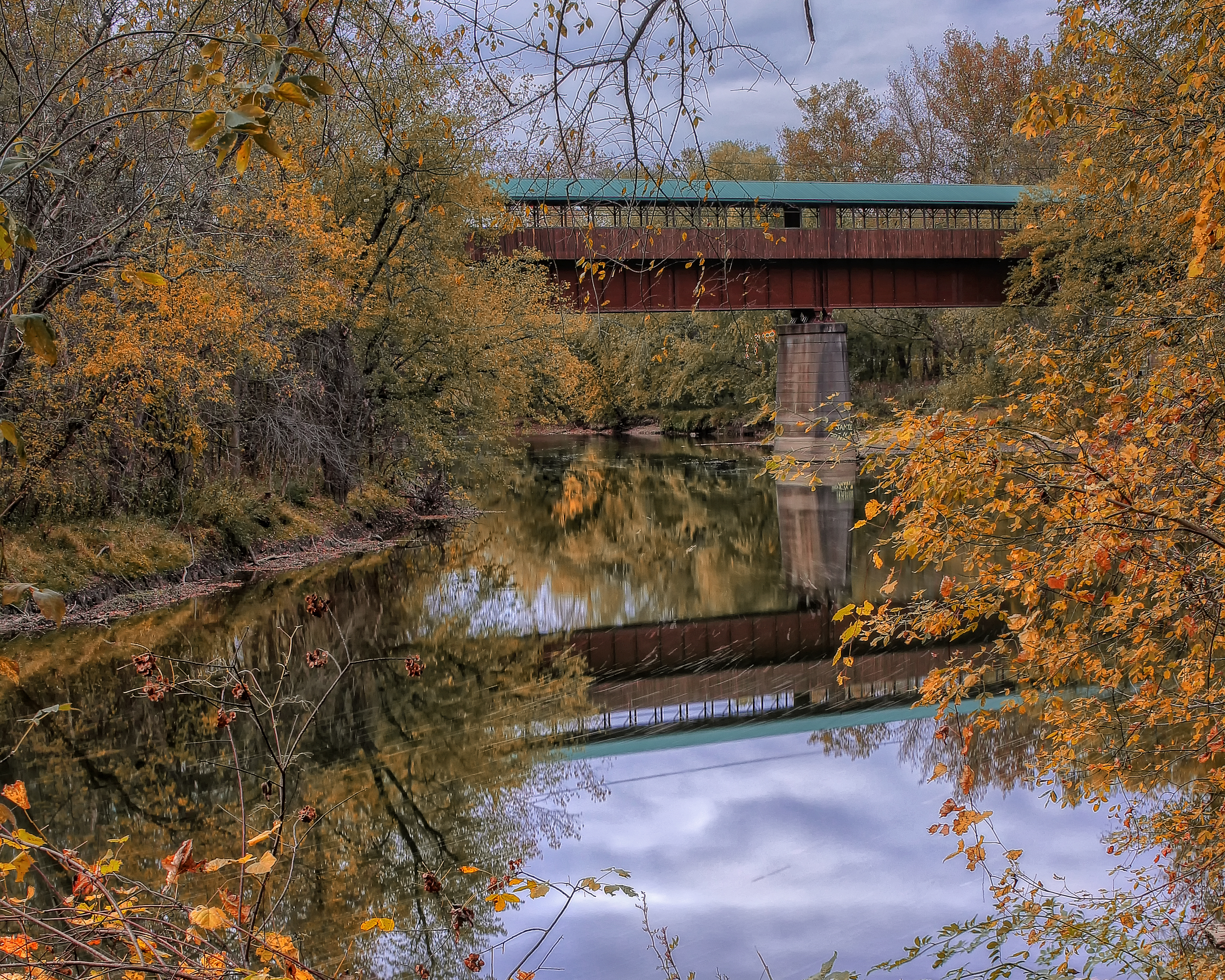
- Bridge of Dreams over the Mohican River near Gann

- Location of Union Township in Knox County.
- Coordinates: 40°26′34″N 82°14′33″W
- Country: United States
- State: Ohio
- County: Knox

Area
  - Total: 30.3 sq mi (78.4 km^{2})
  - Land: 30.2 sq mi (78.3 km^{2})
  - Water: 0.039 sq mi (0.1 km^{2})
- Elevation: 1,070 ft (326 m)

Population (2020)
  - Total: 2,620
  - Density: 86.7/sq mi (33.5/km^{2})
- Time zone: UTC-5 (Eastern (EST))
  - Summer (DST): UTC-4 (EDT)
- FIPS code: 39-78358
- GNIS feature ID: 1086413

Union Township is one of the twenty-two townships of Knox County, Ohio, United States. The 2020 census found 2,620 people in the township.

== Geography ==
Located in the eastern part of the county, it borders the following townships:

- Jefferson Township - north
- Richland Township, Holmes County - northeast
- Tiverton Township, Coshocton County - east
- Newcastle Township, Coshocton County - southeast corner
- Butler Township - south
- Harrison Township - southwest corner
- Howard Township - west
- Brown Township - northwest

Two incorporated villages are located in Union Township: Danville in the northwest, and Gann (Brinkhaven) in the northeast.

== Name and history ==
Union Township was organized in 1808.

It is one of twenty-seven Union Townships statewide.

== Government ==
The township is governed by a three-member board of trustees, who are elected in November of odd-numbered years to a four-year term beginning on the following January 1. Two are elected in the year after the presidential election and one is elected in the year before it. There is also an elected township fiscal officer, who serves a four-year term beginning on April 1 of the year after the election, which is held in November of the year before the presidential election. Vacancies in the fiscal officership or on the board of trustees are filled by the remaining trustees.
