= Hanover Township, Ashland County, Ohio =

Township in Ohio, US

- Township
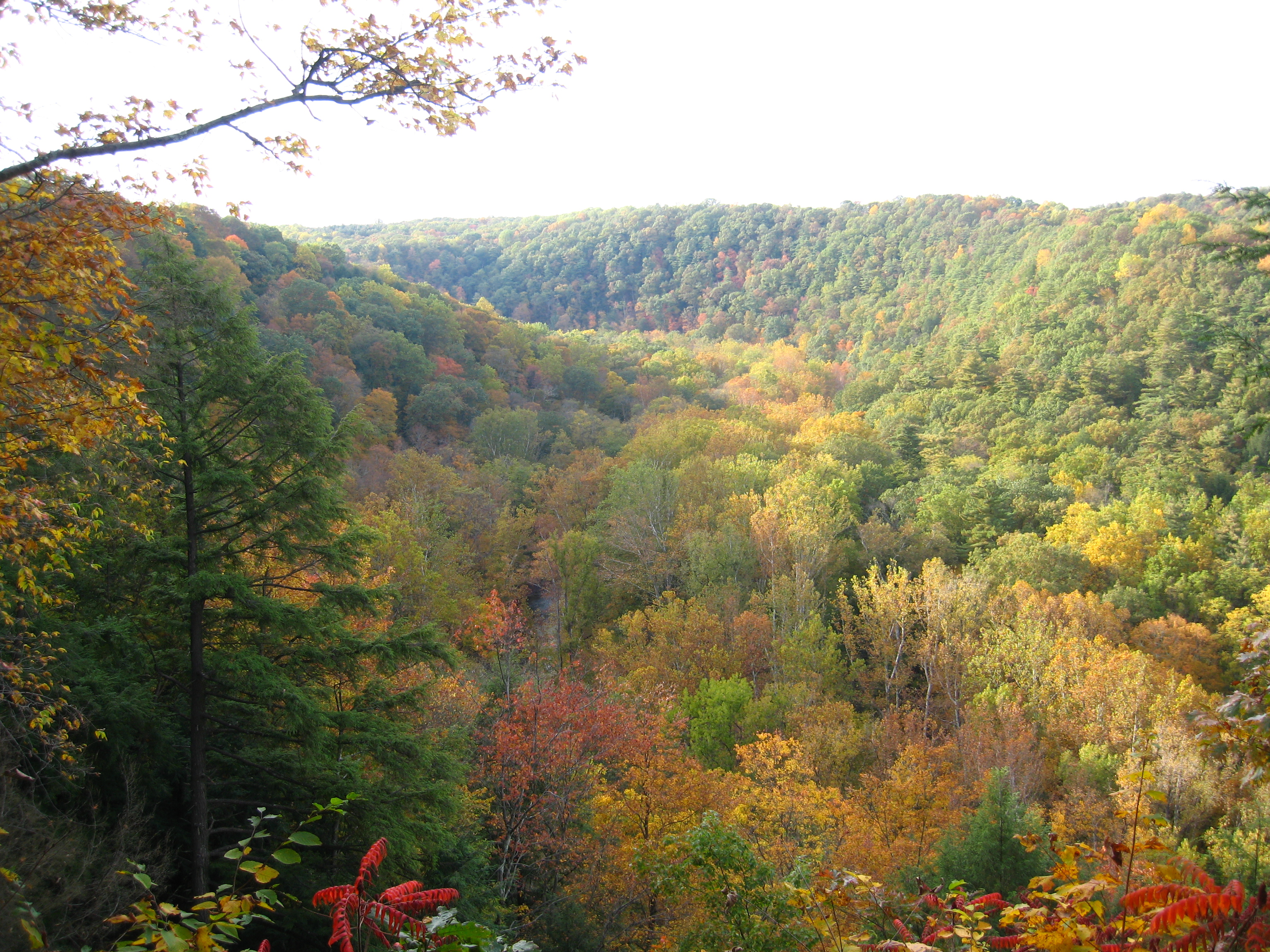
- Mohican State Park

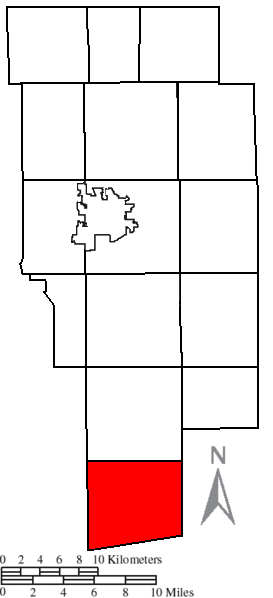
- Location of Hanover Township in Ashland County
- Coordinates: 40°36′52″N 82°15′14″W
- Country: United States
- State: Ohio
- County: Ashland

Area
  - Total: 32.6 sq mi (84.5 km^{2})
  - Land: 32.4 sq mi (83.8 km^{2})
  - Water: 0.27 sq mi (0.7 km^{2})
- Elevation: 1,204 ft (367 m)

Population (2020)
  - Total: 2,467
  - Density: 63/sq mi (24.5/km^{2})
- Time zone: UTC-5 (Eastern (EST))
  - Summer (DST): UTC-4 (EDT)
- FIPS code: 39-33236
- GNIS feature ID: 1085705

Historical population
Census	Pop.	Note	%±
1990	2,377		—
2000	2,520		6.0%
2010	2,050		−18.7%
2020	2,467		20.3%
U.S. Census:

Hanover Township is one of the fifteen townships of Ashland County, Ohio, United States. The population was 2,467 at the 2020 census.

== Geography ==
Located in the far southern part of the county, it borders the following townships:

- Green Township - north
- Washington Township, Holmes County - northeast
- Knox Township, Holmes County - east
- Jefferson Township, Knox County - southeast
- Brown Township, Knox County - southwest
- Worthington Township, Richland County - west
- Monroe Township, Richland County - northwest corner

Part of the village of Loudonville is located in northeastern Hanover Township.

== Name and history ==
Hanover Township began as a part of Richland County in 1806. Hanover Township was organized in 1818. It was separated to become a part of Ashland County upon its formation in 1846.

Statewide, other Hanover Townships are located in Butler, Columbiana, and Licking counties.

== Government ==
The township is governed by a three-member board of trustees, who are elected in November of odd-numbered years to a four-year term beginning on the following January 1. Two are elected in the year after the presidential election and one is elected in the year before it. There is also an elected township fiscal officer, who serves a four-year term beginning on April 1 of the year after the election, which is held in November of the year before the presidential election. Vacancies in the fiscal officership or on the board of trustees are filled by the remaining trustees.
