= Worthington Township, Richland County, Ohio =

Township in Ohio, US

- Township
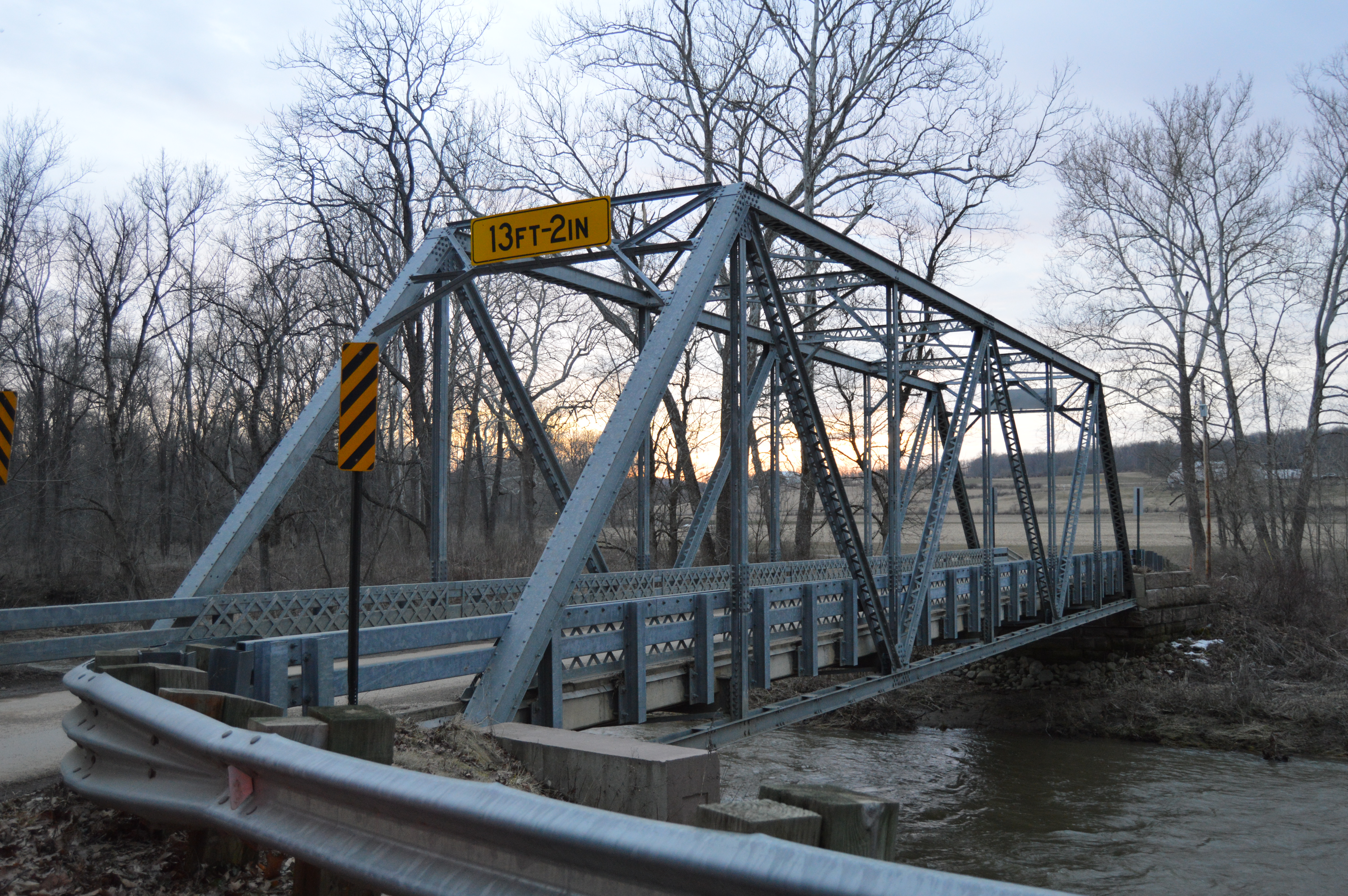
- Benedict Road bridge over Clear Fork

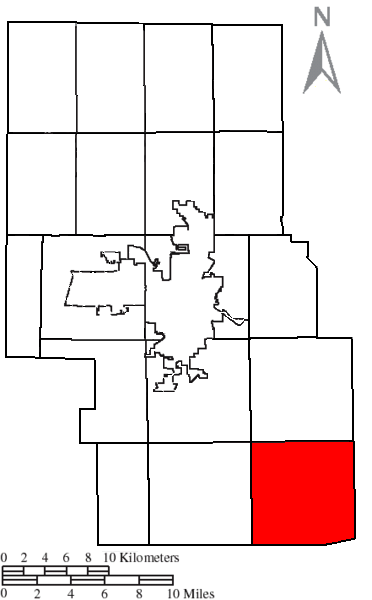
- Location of Worthington Township in Richland County.
- Coordinates: 40°35′45″N 82°24′16″W
- Country: United States
- State: Ohio
- County: Richland

Area
  - Total: 36.2 sq mi (93.7 km^{2})
  - Land: 35.9 sq mi (93.1 km^{2})
  - Water: 0.23 sq mi (0.6 km^{2})
- Elevation: 1,060 ft (323 m)

Population (2020)
  - Total: 2,988
  - Density: 83/sq mi (32.1/km^{2})
- Time zone: UTC-5 (Eastern (EST))
  - Summer (DST): UTC-4 (EDT)
- FIPS code: 39-86618
- GNIS feature ID: 1086890

Worthington Township is one of the eighteen townships of Richland County, Ohio, United States. It is a part of the Mansfield Metropolitan Statistical Area. The 2020 census found 2,988 people in the township.

== Geography ==
Located in the southeastern corner of the county, it borders the following townships:

- Monroe Township - north
- Green Township, Ashland County - northeast corner
- Hanover Township, Ashland County - east
- Brown Township, Knox County - southeast
- Pike Township, Knox County - south
- Berlin Township, Knox County - southwest corner
- Jefferson Township - west
- Washington Township - northwest corner

The village of Butler is located in western Worthington Township, and the unincorporated community of Newville lies in the township's northeast.

== Name and history ==
It is the only Worthington Township statewide.

== Government ==
The township is governed by a three-member board of trustees, who are elected in November of odd-numbered years to a four-year term beginning on the following January 1. Two are elected in the year after the presidential election and one is elected in the year before it. There is also an elected township fiscal officer, who serves a four-year term beginning on April 1 of the year after the election, which is held in November of the year before the presidential election. Vacancies in the fiscal officership or on the board of trustees are filled by the remaining trustees.
