= Vermillion Township, Ashland County, Ohio =

Township in Ohio, US

- Township
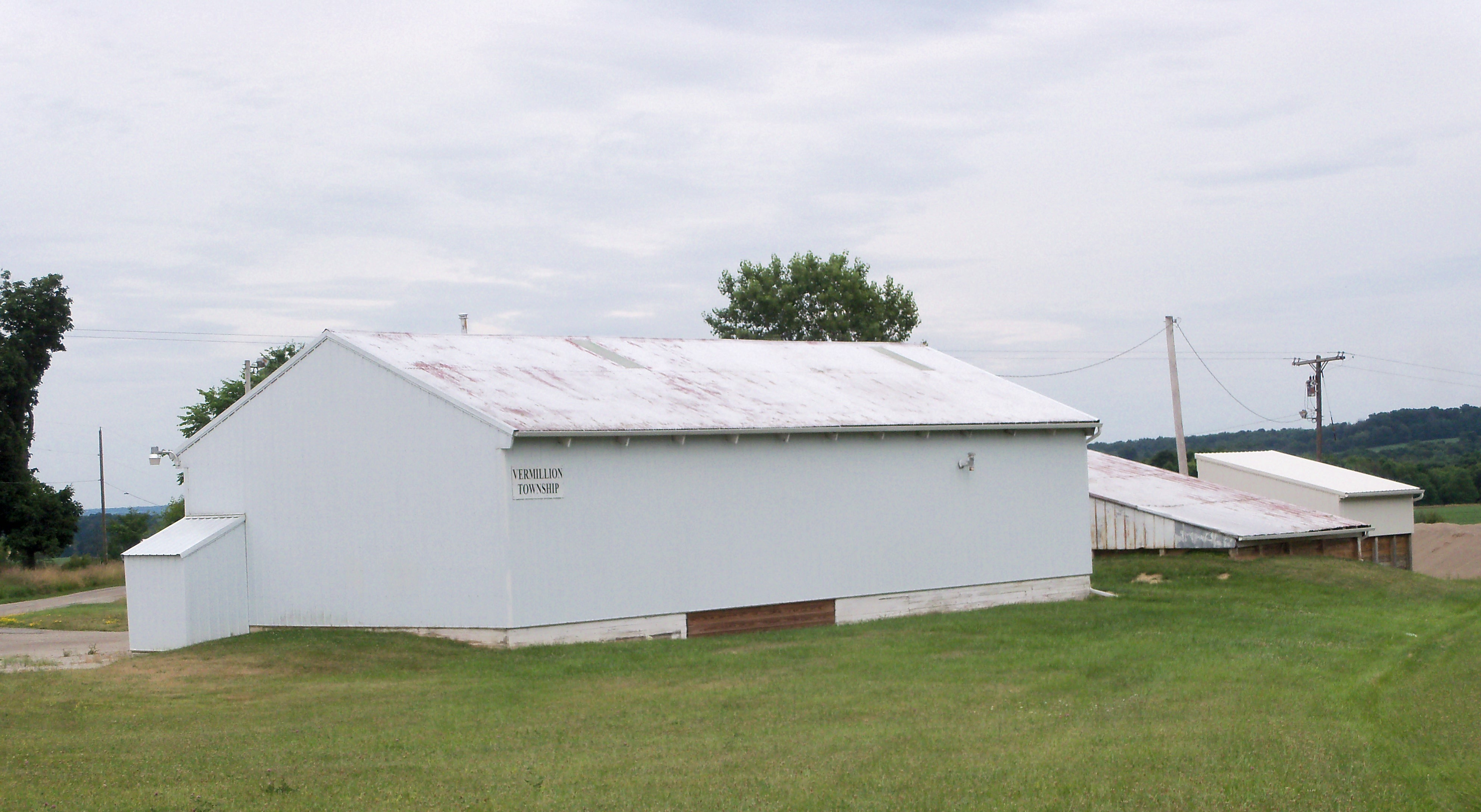
- Township House on Route 179

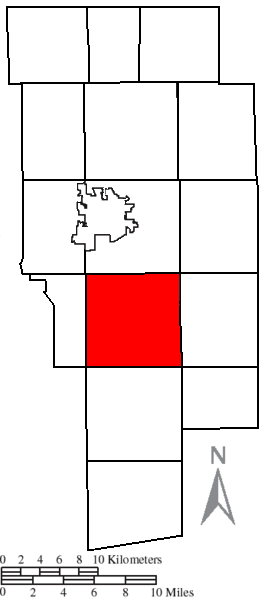
- Location of Vermillion Township in Ashland County
- Coordinates: 40°46′23″N 82°16′13″W
- Country: United States
- State: Ohio
- County: Ashland

Area
  - Total: 37.2 sq mi (96.4 km^{2})
  - Land: 37.1 sq mi (96.2 km^{2})
  - Water: 0.077 sq mi (0.2 km^{2})
- Elevation: 1,152 ft (351 m)

Population (2020)
  - Total: 2,558
  - Density: 70/sq mi (27.2/km^{2})
- Time zone: UTC-5 (Eastern (EST))
  - Summer (DST): UTC-4 (EDT)
- FIPS code: 39-79758
- GNIS feature ID: 1085717

Vermillion Township is one of the fifteen townships of Ashland County, Ohio, United States. The population was 2,558 at the 2020 census.

== Geography ==
Located in the south central part of the county, it borders the following townships:

- Montgomery Township - north
- Perry Township - northeast corner
- Mohican Township - east
- Lake Township - southeast corner
- Green Township - south
- Monroe Township, Richland County - southwest corner
- Mifflin Township - west
- Milton Township - northwest corner

The village of Hayesville is located in central Vermillion Township.

== Name and history ==
Vermillion Township was organized in 1816.

It is the only Vermillion Township statewide, although there is a Vermilion Township in Erie County.

== Government ==
The township is governed by a three-member board of trustees, who are elected in November of odd-numbered years to a four-year term beginning on the following January 1. Two are elected in the year after the presidential election and one is elected in the year before it. There is also an elected township fiscal officer, who serves a four-year term beginning on April 1 of the year after the election, which is held in November of the year before the presidential election. Vacancies in the fiscal officership or on the board of trustees are filled by the remaining trustees.
