= Pike Township, Knox County, Ohio =

Township in Ohio, US

- Township
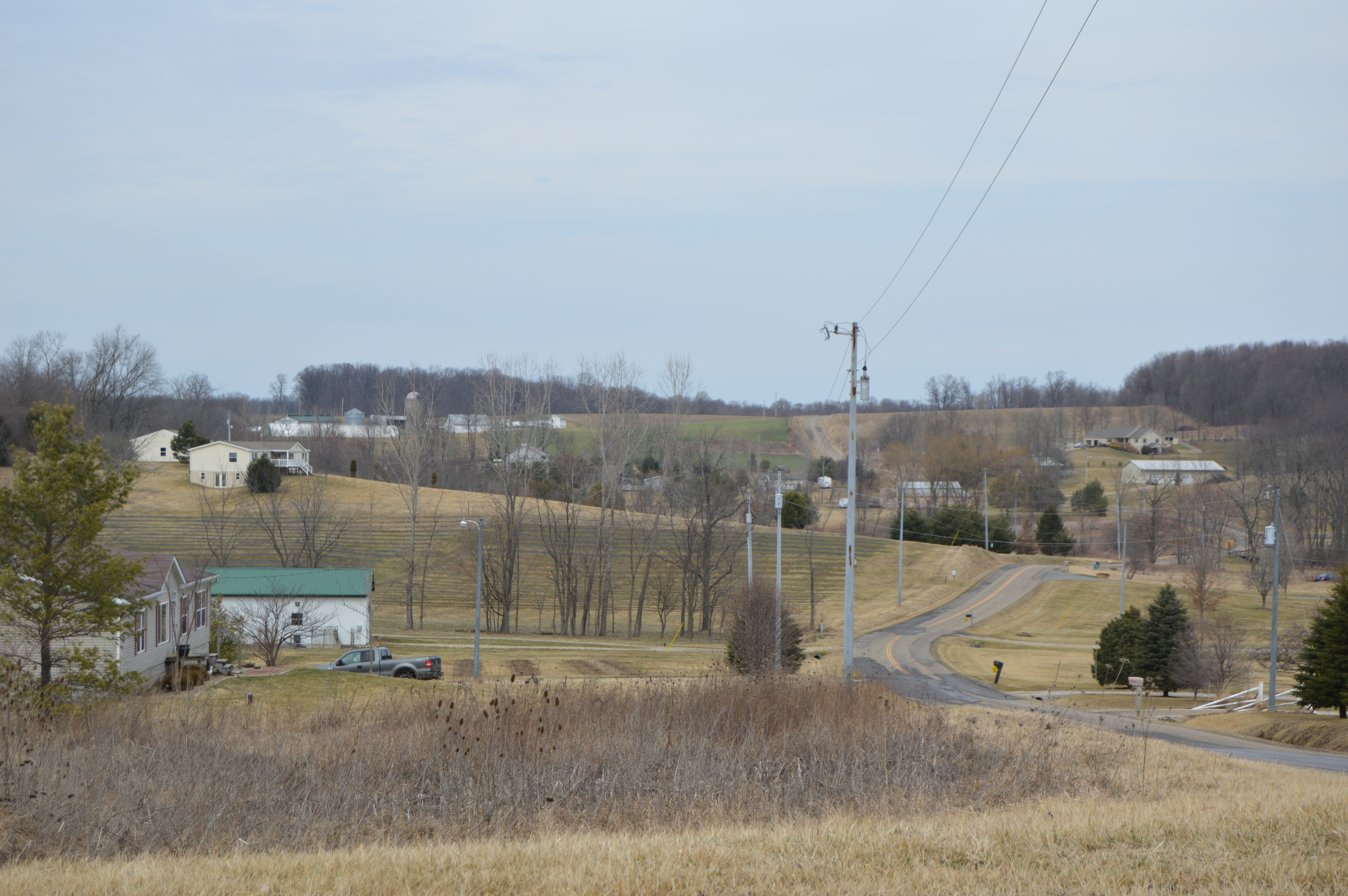
- Houses along North Liberty Road

- Location of Pike Township in Knox County.
- Coordinates: 40°30′41″N 82°24′30″W
- Country: United States
- State: Ohio
- County: Knox

Area
  - Total: 30.5 sq mi (78.9 km^{2})
  - Land: 30.4 sq mi (78.8 km^{2})
  - Water: 0.039 sq mi (0.1 km^{2})
- Elevation: 1,138 ft (347 m)

Population (2020)
  - Total: 1,656
  - Density: 54.4/sq mi (21.0/km^{2})
- Time zone: UTC-5 (Eastern (EST))
  - Summer (DST): UTC-4 (EDT)
- FIPS code: 39-62652
- GNIS feature ID: 1086411

Historical population
Census	Pop.	Note	%±
1990	1,065		—
2000	1,298		21.9%
2010	1,532		18.0%
2020	1,656		8.1%
2024 (est.)	1,723		4.0%
U.S. Census:

Pike Township is one of the twenty-two townships of Knox County, Ohio, United States. The 2020 census found 1,656 people in the township.

== Geography ==
Located in the northern part of the county, it borders the following townships:

- Worthington Township, Richland County - north
- Brown Township - east
- Howard Township - southeast corner
- Monroe Township - south
- Morris Township - southwest
- Berlin Township - west
- Jefferson Township, Richland County - northwest corner

No municipalities are located in Pike Township.

== Name and history ==
Pike Township was established in 1819. It is named for General Zebulon Pike.

It is one of eight Pike Townships statewide.

== Government ==
The township is governed by a three-member board of trustees, who are elected in November of odd-numbered years to a four-year term beginning on the following January 1. Two are elected in the year after the presidential election and one is elected in the year before it. There is also an elected township fiscal officer, who serves a four-year term beginning on April 1 of the year after the election, which is held in November of the year before the presidential election. Vacancies in the fiscal officership or on the board of trustees are filled by the remaining trustees.
