= Howard Township, Knox County, Ohio =

Township in Ohio, US

- Township
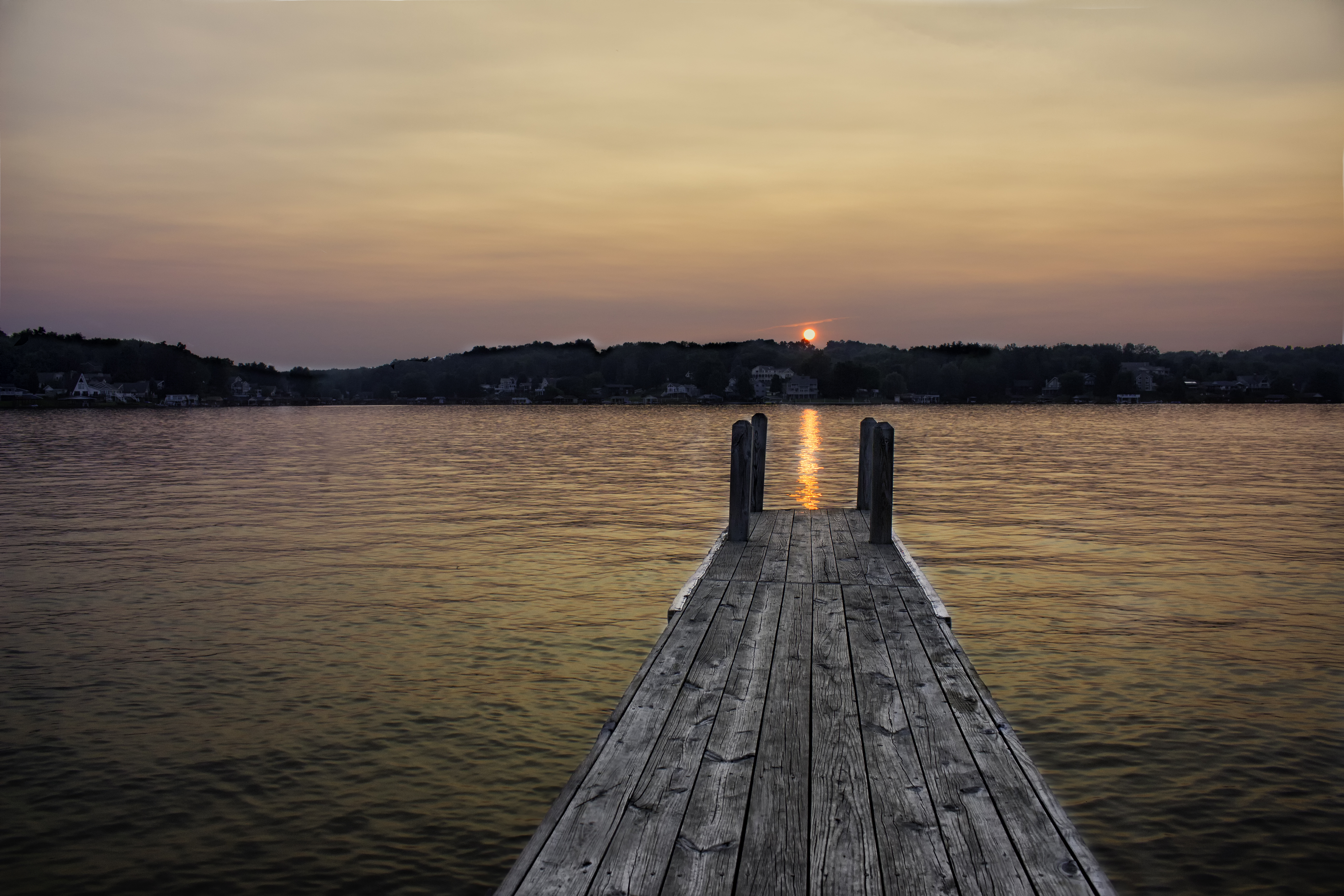
- Sunset at Apple Valley Lake

- Location of Howard Township in Knox County.
- Coordinates: 40°25′50″N 82°19′47″W
- Country: United States
- State: Ohio
- County: Knox

Area
  - Total: 23.4 sq mi (60.7 km^{2})
  - Land: 22.6 sq mi (58.6 km^{2})
  - Water: 0.81 sq mi (2.1 km^{2})
- Elevation: 1,080 ft (330 m)

Population (2020)
  - Total: 5,873
  - Density: 260/sq mi (100/km^{2})
- Time zone: UTC-5 (Eastern (EST))
  - Summer (DST): UTC-4 (EDT)
- ZIP code: 43028
- Area code: 740
- FIPS code: 39-36526
- GNIS feature ID: 1086400
- Website: https://www.howardtwp-oh.gov/

Howard Township is one of the twenty-two townships of Knox County, Ohio, United States. The 2020 census found 5,873 people in the township.

== Geography ==
Located in the east central part of the county, it borders the following townships:

- Brown Township - north
- Union Township - east
- Butler Township - southeast corner
- Harrison Township - south
- College Township - southwest corner
- Monroe Township - west
- Pike Township - northwest corner

No municipalities are located in Howard Township, although the census-designated place of Howard lies in the southern part of the township. The CDP of Apple Valley also lies partly within Howard Township.

== Name and history ==
Howard Township was organized in 1825.

It is the only Howard Township statewide.

== Government ==
The township is governed by a three-member board of trustees, who are elected in November of odd-numbered years to a four-year term beginning on the following January 1. Two are elected in the year after the presidential election and one is elected in the year before it. There is also an elected township fiscal officer, who serves a four-year term beginning on April 1 of the year after the election, which is held in November of the year before the presidential election. Vacancies in the fiscal officership or on the board of trustees are filled by the remaining trustees.
