= Jefferson Township, Knox County, Ohio =

Township in Ohio, US

- Township
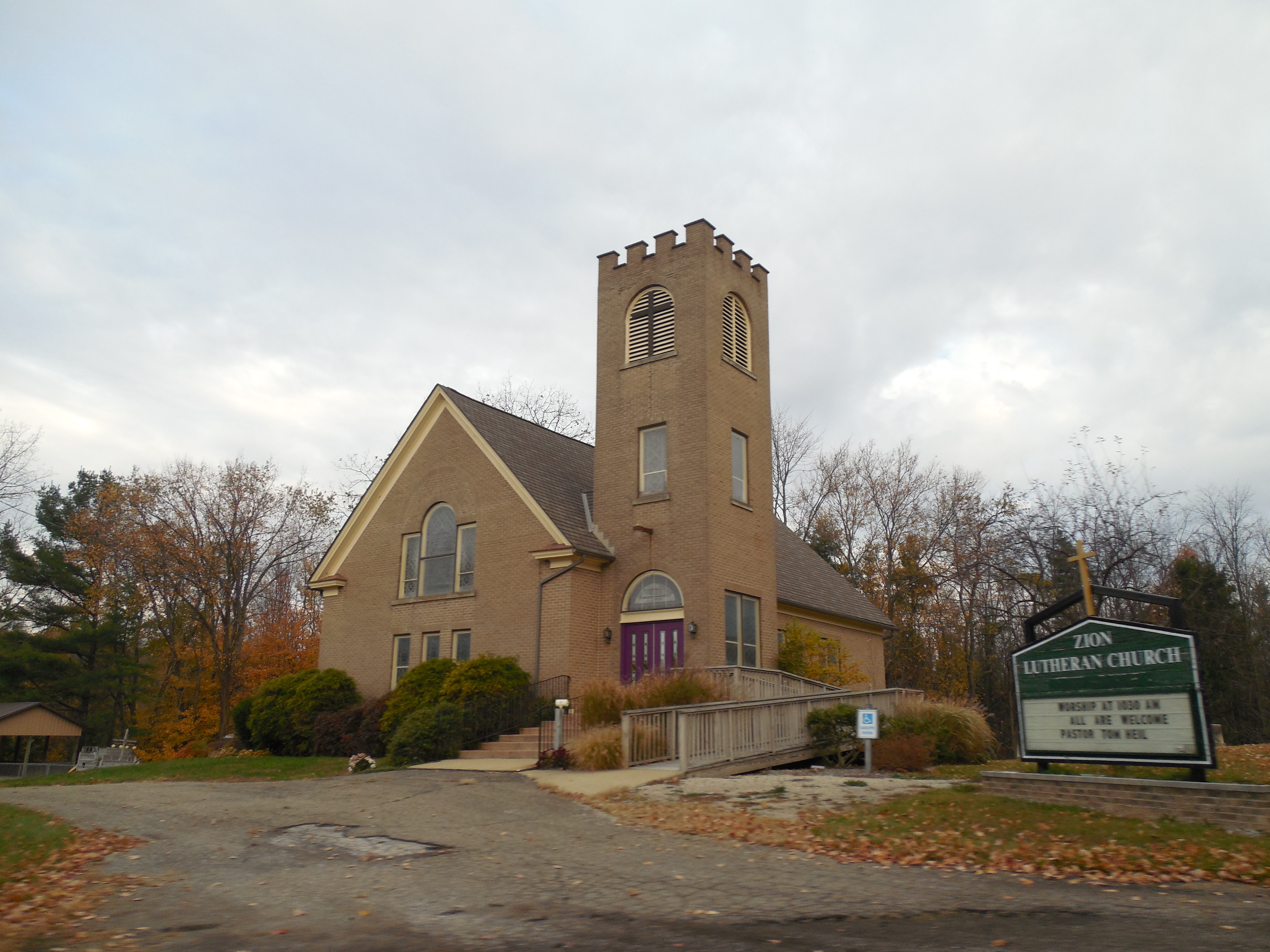
- Lutheran church in Jelloway

- Location of Jefferson Township in Knox County.
- Coordinates: 40°30′54″N 82°14′0″W
- Country: United States
- State: Ohio
- County: Knox

Area
  - Total: 32.9 sq mi (85.1 km^{2})
  - Land: 32.8 sq mi (85.0 km^{2})
  - Water: 0.039 sq mi (0.1 km^{2})
- Elevation: 1,030 ft (314 m)

Population (2020)
  - Total: 768
  - Density: 23.4/sq mi (9.04/km^{2})
- Time zone: UTC-5 (Eastern (EST))
  - Summer (DST): UTC-4 (EDT)
- FIPS code: 39-38668
- GNIS feature ID: 1086402
- Website: https://jeffersonknoxohio.gov/

Historical population
Census	Pop.	Note	%±
1990	524		—
2000	604		15.3%
2010	633		4.8%
2020	768		21.3%
2024 (est.)	813		5.9%
U.S. Census:

Jefferson Township is one of the twenty-two townships of Knox County, Ohio, United States. The 2020 census found 768 people in the township.

== Geography ==
Located in the northeastern corner of the county, it borders the following townships:

- Knox Township, Holmes County - northeast
- Richland Township, Holmes County - southeast
- Union Township - south
- Brown Township - west
- Hanover Township, Ashland County - northwest

No municipalities are located in Jefferson Township.

== Name and history ==
Jefferson Township was organized in 1829. It is named for Thomas Jefferson, third President of the United States.

It is one of twenty-four Jefferson Townships statewide.

== Government ==
The township is governed by a three-member board of trustees, who are elected in November of odd-numbered years to a four-year term beginning on the following January 1. Two are elected in the year after the presidential election and one is elected in the year before it. There is also an elected township fiscal officer, who serves a four-year term beginning on April 1 of the year after the election, which is held in November of the year before the presidential election. Vacancies in the fiscal officership or on the board of trustees are filled by the remaining trustees.
