= Lake Township, Ashland County, Ohio =

Township in Ohio, US

- Township
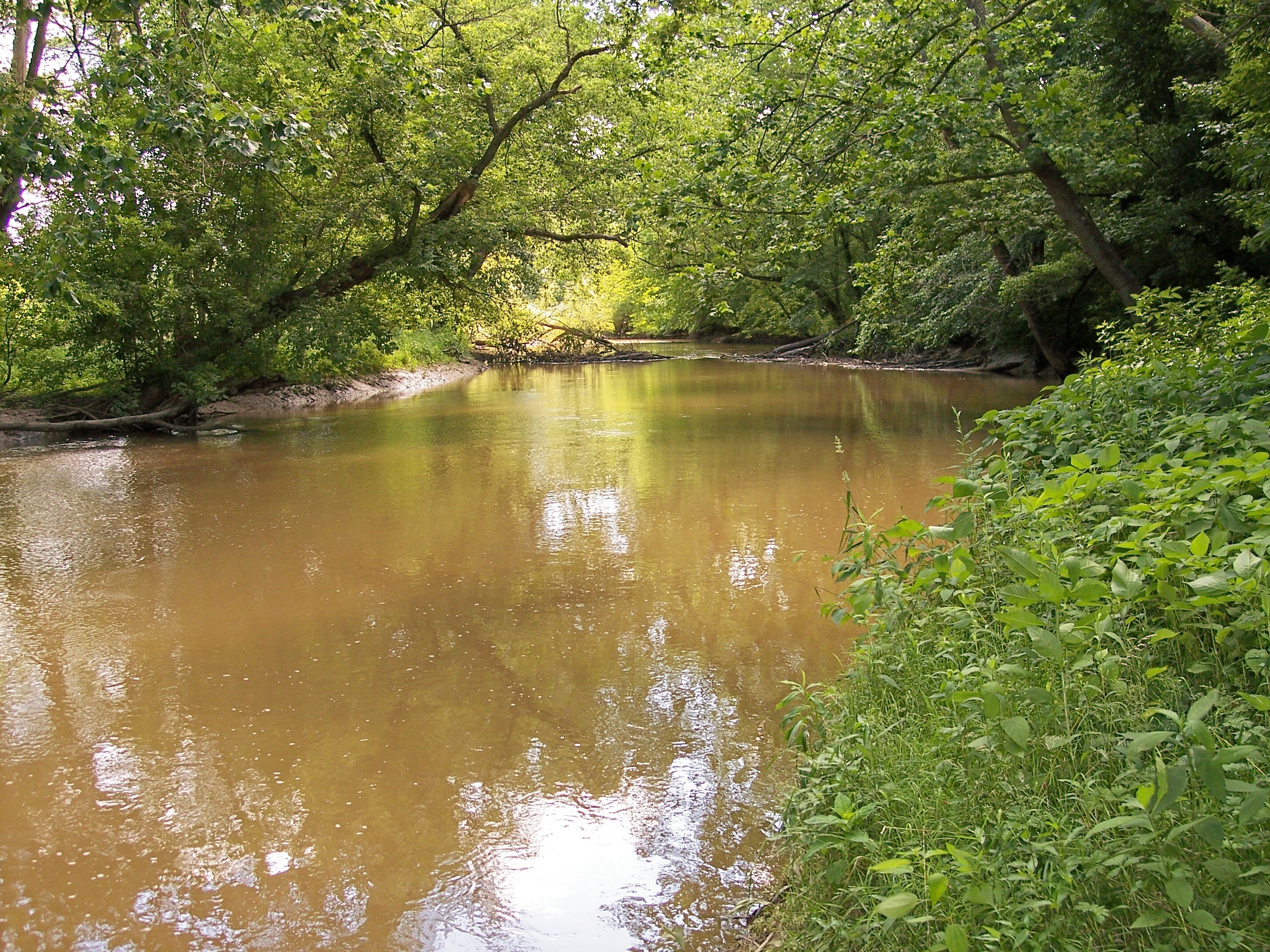
- The Lake Fork of the Mohican River

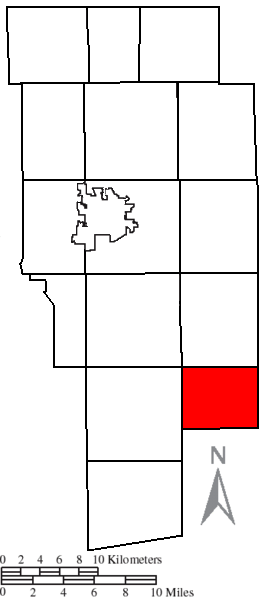
- Location of Lake Township in Ashland County
- Coordinates: 40°41′56″N 82°9′37″W
- Country: United States
- State: Ohio
- County: Ashland

Area
  - Total: 20.1 sq mi (52.1 km^{2})
  - Land: 20.0 sq mi (51.9 km^{2})
  - Water: 0.077 sq mi (0.2 km^{2})
- Elevation: 1,086 ft (331 m)

Population (2020)
  - Total: 736
  - Density: 34/sq mi (13.3/km^{2})
- Time zone: UTC-5 (Eastern (EST))
  - Summer (DST): UTC-4 (EDT)
- FIPS code: 39-41272
- GNIS feature ID: 1085707

Historical population
Census	Pop.	Note	%±
1990	543		—
2000	735		35.4%
2010	690		−6.1%
2020	736		6.7%
U.S. Census:

Lake Township is one of the fifteen townships of Ashland County, Ohio, United States. The population was 736 at the 2020 census.

== Geography ==
Located in the southeastern part of the county, it borders the following townships:

- Mohican Township - north
- Plain Township, Wayne County - northeast corner
- Clinton Township, Wayne County - east
- Washington Township, Holmes County - south
- Green Township - west
- Vermillion Township - northwest corner

No municipalities are located in Lake Township.

== Name and history ==
Lake Township was organized in 1814.

Statewide, other Lake Townships are located in Logan, Stark, and Wood counties.

== Government ==
The township is governed by a three-member board of trustees, who are elected in November of odd-numbered years to a four-year term beginning on the following January 1. Two are elected in the year after the presidential election and one is elected in the year before it. There is also an elected township fiscal officer, who serves a four-year term beginning on April 1 of the year after the election, which is held in November of the year before the presidential election. Vacancies in the fiscal officership or on the board of trustees are filled by the remaining trustees.
