= Washington Township, Richland County, Ohio =

Township in Ohio, US

- Township
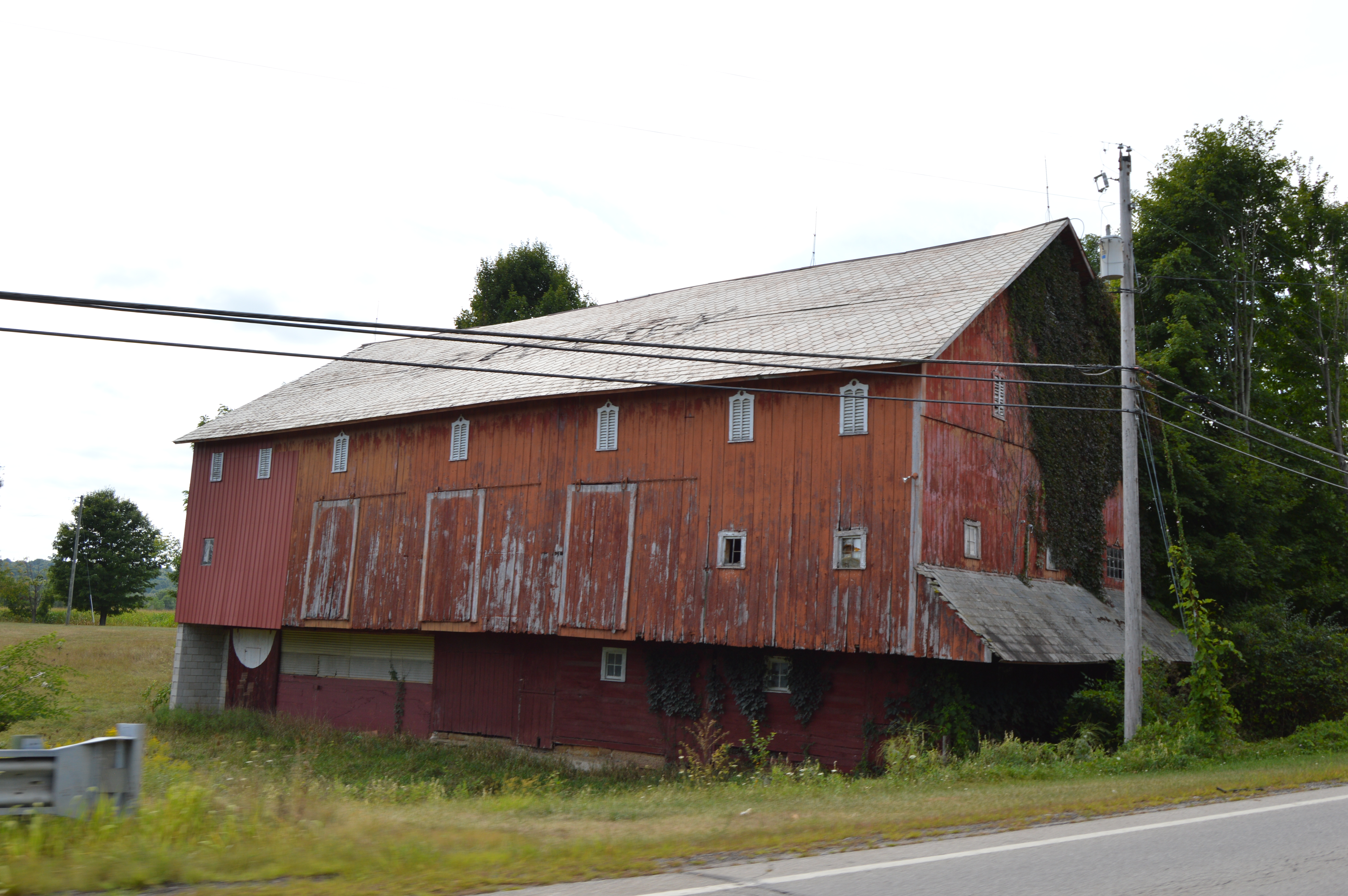
- State Route 97 barn northwest of Bellville

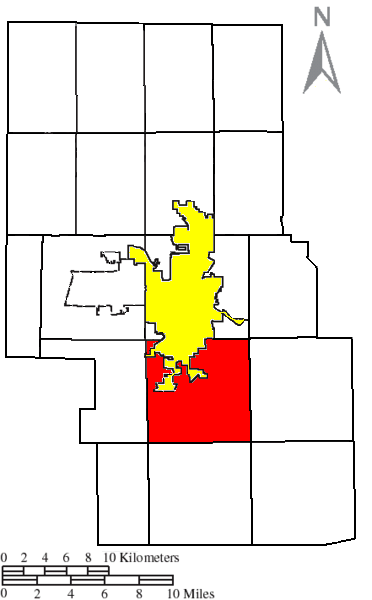
- Location of Washington Township (red) in Richland County, next to the city of Mansfield (yellow).
- Coordinates: 40°41′6″N 82°31′7″W
- Country: United States
- State: Ohio
- County: Richland

Area
  - Total: 32.4 sq mi (84.0 km^{2})
  - Land: 32.4 sq mi (84.0 km^{2})
  - Water: 0 sq mi (0.0 km^{2})
- Elevation: 1,302 ft (397 m)

Population (2020)
  - Total: 6,622
  - Density: 204/sq mi (78.8/km^{2})
- Time zone: UTC-5 (Eastern (EST))
  - Summer (DST): UTC-4 (EDT)
- FIPS code: 39-81578
- GNIS feature ID: 1086888
- Website: https://washingtontwp.us/

Washington Township is one of the eighteen townships of Richland County, Ohio, United States. It is a part of the Mansfield Metropolitan Statistical Area. The 2020 census found 6,622 people in the township.

== Geography ==
Located in the southern part of the county, it borders the following townships:

- Madison Township - north
- Mifflin Township - northeast corner
- Monroe Township - east
- Worthington Township - southeast corner
- Jefferson Township - south
- Perry Township - southwest corner
- Troy Township - west
- Springfield Township - northwest corner

Parts of three municipalities are located in Washington Township: the city of Mansfield — the county seat of Richland County — in the north, the village of Bellville in the south, and the village of Lexington in the west.

== Name and history ==
It is one of forty-three Washington Townships statewide.

== Government ==
The township is governed by a three-member board of trustees, who are elected in November of odd-numbered years to a four-year term beginning on the following January 1. Two are elected in the year after the presidential election and one is elected in the year before it. There is also an elected township fiscal officer, who serves a four-year term beginning on April 1 of the year after the election, which is held in November of the year before the presidential election. Vacancies in the fiscal officership or on the board of trustees are filled by the remaining trustees.

== Trustees ==
- Chairman: Dave Yoder
- Vice Chairman: Bob Entenmann
- Trustee: Jack Butler
- Fiscal Officer: Annette Depue
- Zoning Inspector: Tim Boggs
