= Butler Township, Knox County, Ohio =

Township in Ohio, US

- Township
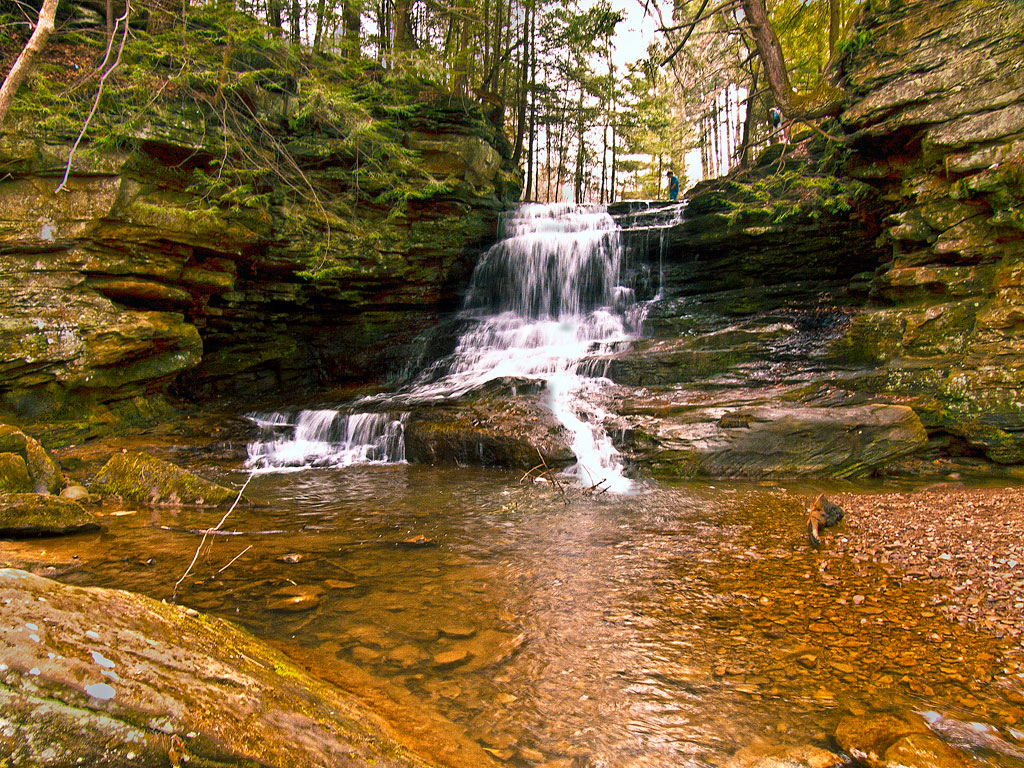
- Waterfall on Honey Run

- Location of Butler Township in Knox County.
- Coordinates: 40°21′33″N 82°13′54″W
- Country: United States
- State: Ohio
- County: Knox

Area
  - Total: 24.4 sq mi (63.2 km^{2})
  - Land: 24.4 sq mi (63.1 km^{2})
  - Water: 0 sq mi (0.0 km^{2})
- Elevation: 1,080 ft (330 m)

Population (2020)
  - Total: 1,294
  - Density: 53.1/sq mi (20.5/km^{2})
- Time zone: UTC-5 (Eastern (EST))
  - Summer (DST): UTC-4 (EDT)
- FIPS code: 39-10590
- GNIS feature ID: 1086393

Historical population
Census	Pop.	Note	%±
1990	504		—
2000	798		58.3%
2010	1,171		46.7%
2020	1,294		10.5%
U.S. Census:

Butler Township is one of the twenty-two townships of Knox County, Ohio, United States. The 2020 census found 1,294 people in the township.

== Geography ==
Located in the eastern part of the county, it borders the following townships:

- Union Township - north
- Tiverton Township, Coshocton County - northeast corner
- Newcastle Township, Coshocton County - east
- Perry Township, Coshocton County - southeast corner
- Jackson Township - south
- Clay Township - southwest corner
- Harrison Township - west
- Howard Township - northwest corner

No municipalities are located in Butler Township.

== Name and history ==
Butler Township was organized in 1825.

It is one of six Butler Townships statewide.

== Government ==
The township is governed by a three-member board of trustees, who are elected in November of odd-numbered years to a four-year term beginning on the following January 1. Two are elected in the year after the presidential election and one is elected in the year before it. There is also an elected township fiscal officer, who serves a four-year term beginning on April 1 of the year after the election, which is held in November of the year before the presidential election. Vacancies in the fiscal officership or on the board of trustees are filled by the remaining trustees.
