= Harrison Township, Knox County, Ohio =

Township in Ohio, US

Harrison Township, Knox County Ohio
- Township
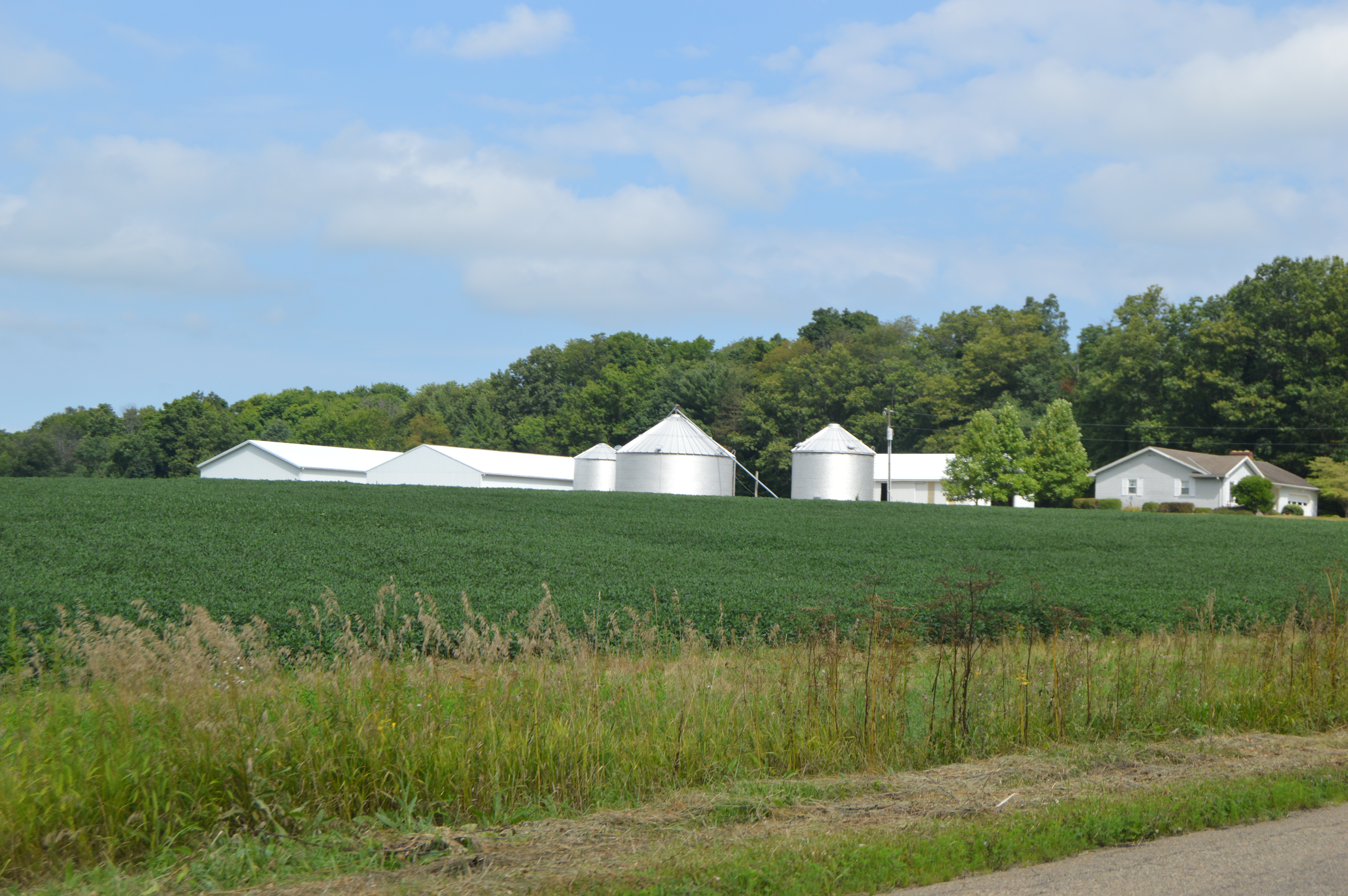
- Fields on Grove Church Road

- Location of Harrison Township in Knox County.
- Coordinates: 40°21′23″N 82°19′12″W
- Country: United States
- State: Ohio
- County: Knox

Area
  - Total: 24.1 sq mi (62.3 km^{2})
  - Land: 24.1 sq mi (62.3 km^{2})
  - Water: 0 sq mi (0.0 km^{2})
- Elevation: 1,033 ft (315 m)

Population (2020)
  - Total: 854
  - Density: 35.5/sq mi (13.7/km^{2})
- Time zone: UTC-5 (Eastern (EST))
  - Summer (DST): UTC-4 (EDT)
- FIPS code: 39-33880
- GNIS feature ID: 1086398

Harrison Township is one of the twenty-two townships of Knox County, Ohio, United States. The 2020 census found 854 people in the township.

== Geography ==
Located in the east central part of the county, it borders the following townships:

- Howard Township - north
- Union Township - northeast corner
- Butler Township - east
- Jackson Township - southeast corner
- Clay Township - south
- Morgan Township - southwest corner
- Pleasant Township - west, south of College Township
- College Township - northwest, between Pleasant and Monroe Townships
- Monroe Township - northwest corner, north of College Township

No municipalities are located in Harrison Township.

== Name and history ==
Harrison Township was organized in 1825. It is named for William Henry Harrison.

It is one of nineteen Harrison Townships statewide.

== Government ==
The township is governed by a three-member board of trustees, who are elected in November of odd-numbered years to a four-year term beginning on the following January 1. Two are elected in the year after the presidential election and one is elected in the year before it. There is also an elected township fiscal officer, who serves a four-year term beginning on April 1 of the year after the election, which is held in November of the year before the presidential election. Vacancies in the fiscal officership or on the board of trustees are filled by the remaining trustees.
