= Fallsville, Ohio =

Fallsville
- Location within the state of Ohio
- Coordinates: 39°17′13.23″N 83°37′52.72″W
- Country: United States
- State: Ohio
- County: Highland
- GNIS feature ID: 1053230

Fallsville, Ohio was a small town in Highland County in existence from 1848 to 1893.

The area was first settled in the mid-1820s by farmers Simon and Elizabeth Clouser. They built a grist mill which, as it was the only mill in the immediate vicinity, became successful. Around this additional mills were built, as well as stores and a quary. A town was platted in 1848 by John Timberlake with three streets and eight residences in place. Fallsville was sufficiently socially active to have its own literary society. Although a fanciful 1872 column forecast a bright future for the town, Fallsville failed to attract a railroad, and planned-for growth never occurred. A Methodist Church was built in 1891, but the town's last resident died two years later in 1893.

As of 2018 some residential foundations remained, as well as a rusted water tank for the town's horses. As a ghost town, the location has attained a reputation for paranormal activity involving Native Americans, hidden treasure, and descendants of the superstitious Clouser family.
