= Moscow, Licking County, Ohio =

Ghost town in Ohio, United States

Coordinates: 39°57′40″N 82°28′04″W

Moscow is a ghost town in Licking County, in the U.S. state of Ohio. Located 39°57'40.0"N 82°27'50.6"W, on the US 40, at the intersection of Mill Dam Rd.

== History ==
Moscow was laid out in 1830 by Daniel and William Green after erecting a mill on the south fork of the Licking River. It was mentioned in the 1866 Licking County atlas, and described in the 1881 Licking County Ohio history book as "nearly passed away".
