= Monroe Township, Richland County, Ohio =

Township in Ohio, US

- Township
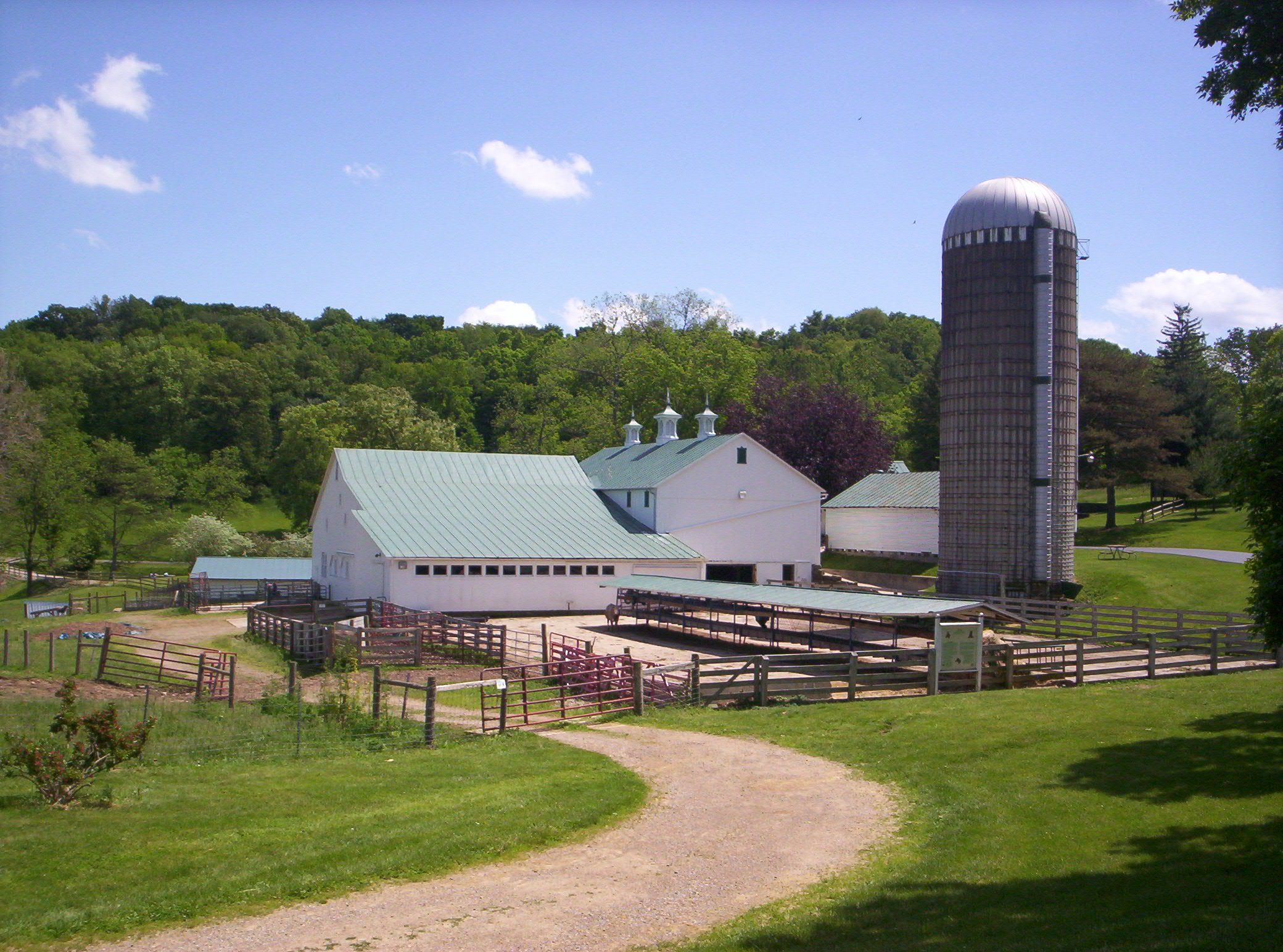
- Malabar Farm State Park

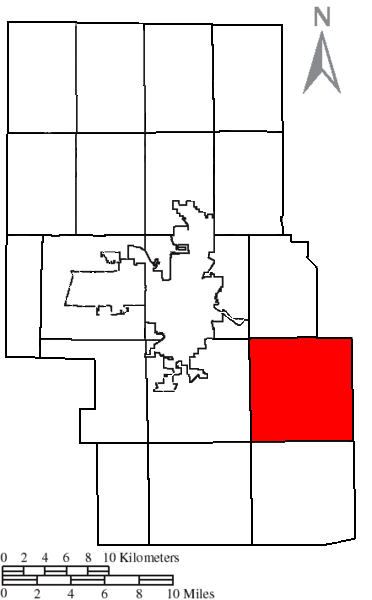
- Location of Monroe Township in Richland County.
- Coordinates: 40°41′33″N 82°23′35″W
- Country: United States
- State: Ohio
- County: Richland

Area
  - Total: 37.1 sq mi (96.1 km^{2})
  - Land: 36.4 sq mi (94.3 km^{2})
  - Water: 0.69 sq mi (1.8 km^{2})
- Elevation: 1,010 ft (308 m)

Population (2020)
  - Total: 2,721
  - Density: 75/sq mi (28.9/km^{2})
- Time zone: UTC-5 (Eastern (EST))
  - Summer (DST): UTC-4 (EDT)
- FIPS code: 39-51576
- GNIS feature ID: 1086881
- Website: https://monroetwplucas.org/

Monroe Township is one of the eighteen townships of Richland County, Ohio, United States. It is a part of the Mansfield Metropolitan Statistical Area. The 2020 census found 2,721 people in the township.

== Geography ==
Located in the southeastern part of the county, it borders the following townships:

- Mifflin Township – north, west of Mifflin Township, Ashland County
- Mifflin Township, Ashland County – north, east of Mifflin Township, Richland County
- Vermillion Township, Ashland County – northeast corner
- Green Township, Ashland County – east
- Hanover Township, Ashland County – southeast corner
- Butler Township – south
- Jefferson Township – southwest corner
- Washington Township – west
- Madison Township – northwest corner

Part of the village of Lucas is located in northwestern Monroe Township.

== Name and history ==
Monroe Township was organized on February 11, 1817 with the first settler being a man named David Hill who built the first cabin in the southwestern section of the township. It is one of twenty-two Monroe Townships statewide.

== Government ==
The township is governed by a three-member board of trustees, who are elected in November of odd-numbered years to a four-year term beginning on the following January 1. Two are elected in the year after the presidential election and one is elected in the year before it. There is also an elected township fiscal officer, who serves a four-year term beginning on April 1 of the year after the election, which is held in November of the year before the presidential election. Vacancies in the fiscal officership or on the board of trustees are filled by the remaining trustees.
