= New Hampton, Ohio =

Village in the United States

New Hampton was a village in Jefferson Township, Madison County, Ohio, United States. It is now part of the village of West Jefferson.

== History ==
Founded in 1822, the village consisted of 93 lots with eight streets. Several businesses, a Baptist church, and a post office were located in the community. The village declined after the National Road was built a short distance away to the north, as residents preferred to live along the new road. With the foundation of the town of Jefferson (now known as West Jefferson), the community was abandoned; the last building to be used was the Baptist church, which was abandoned after a new Baptist church was organized in the town of Jefferson around 1840. All that remains of the village is a cemetery and part of the village's Main Street.

== Geography ==
New Hampton is located at 39°56′23″N 83°16′9″W.
