= Wonderland (Columbus, Ohio) =

Defunct community in Columbus, OH

Coordinates: 40°00′10″N 82°52′15″W

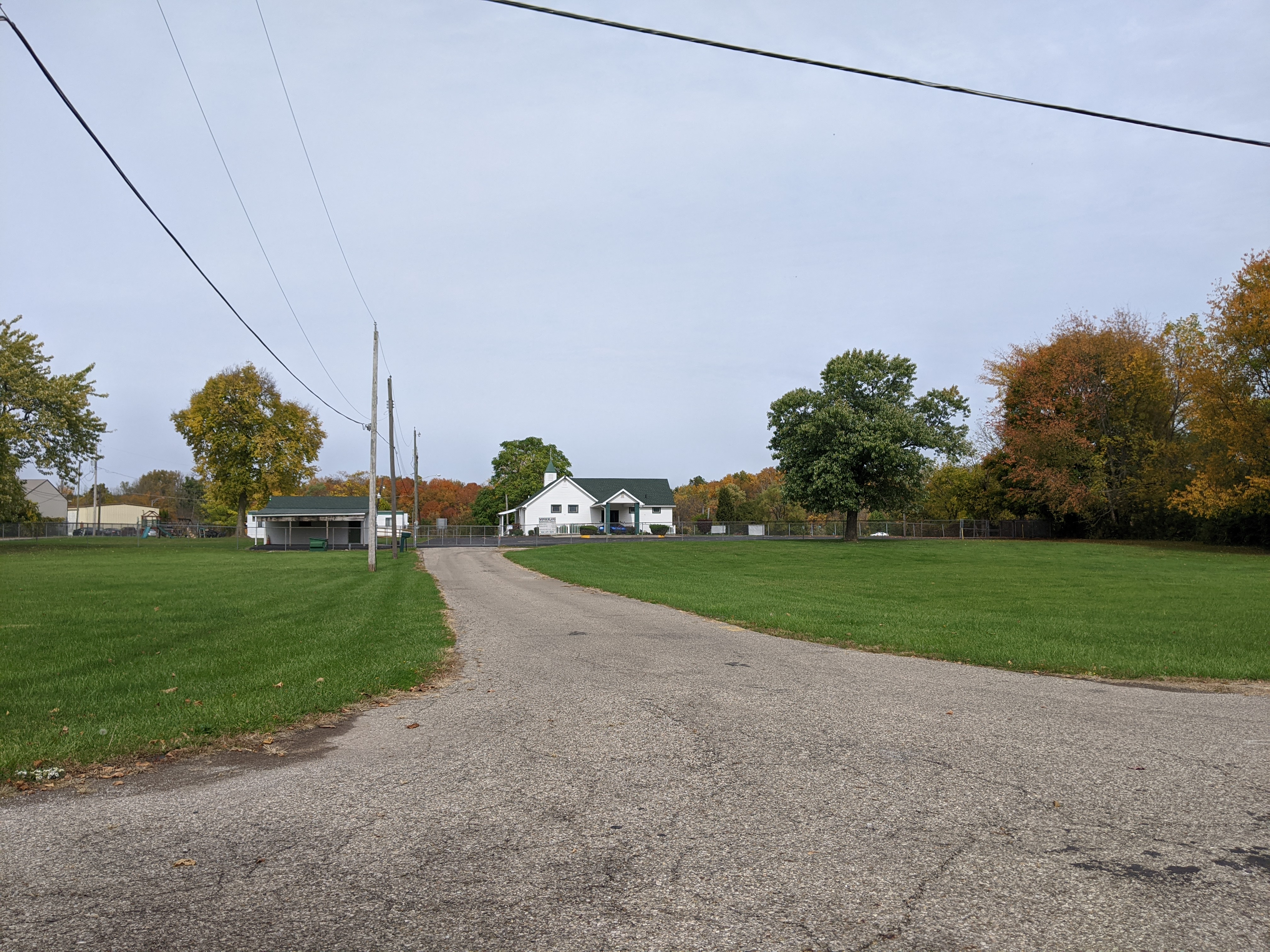
Wonderland Community Church surrounded by formerly inhabited land

Wonderland was a community of summer cottages, just outside the Columbus suburb of Gahanna, near a bend in Big Walnut Creek. By the beginning of the Depression, many of the summer cottages were winterized and became year round homes. In the early-1970s Port Columbus International Airport planned an extension of their north runway, and because of the need for a clear approach, the airport authority was given the go ahead to buy out the remaining property owners still living in Wonderland. Some of the homes were moved to Agler Road, alternating new-built homes between relocated homes. The remaining structures were razed, and the area fenced off. Because its congregation was still using its building, and the church was at the eastern edge of the land, Wonderland Community Church, on Friendship Drive, next to the interchange of Interstate 270 and Hamilton Road was allowed to remain.

== History ==
Local folktales and rumours in Gahanna and on the east side of Columbus up until the early 1980s said that Wonderland was developed after World War I as a "utopia" of sorts, although this has never been proven. The Columbus Citizen, April 23, 1927, page 7 stated that Wonderland Opens Sunday.

Until the early 1980s there were still people living in the community, most of whose children attended Gahanna schools. Many of the homes built during its creation were now well below flood level and when the Big Walnut river rose it would flood houses in the community.

Wonderland never incorporated, and was considered "an accommodation", rather than an unincorporated community.
