= Newville, Ohio =

- Ghost town
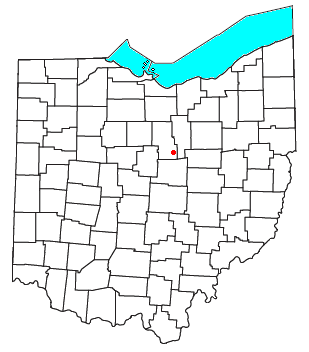
- Location of Newville, Ohio
- Coordinates: 40°37′49″N 82°23′08″W
- Country: United States
- State: Ohio
- County: Richland
- Township: Worthington
- Time zone: UTC-5 (Eastern (EST))
  - Summer (DST): UTC-4 (EDT)

Newville was a town located near what is now Pleasant Hill Lake, in northeastern Worthington Township, Richland County, Ohio, United States.

== History ==
This area of present-day Ohio was first inhabited by tribes such as the Wyandots, Iroquois, Shawnee, and Delawares. These groups grew crops such as corn, beans, squash, and other crops to complement a diet of hunted meat. The tribes generally inhabited fixed villages with traditional long houses in small groups that responded to the topography and natural resources available in a certain area. Native American Tribes were expelled during the Indian removal following the Treaty of Greenville. Newville was then founded by John Frederick Herring and was platted in December 1823. It is situated upon section three, Worthington Township. Abraham Nye was one of the first settlers there, and was instrumental in inducing Mr. Herring to lay out the town. Newville lies in a small valley at the confluence of Slater's Run with the Clearfork of the Mohican River, nearly surrounded by tree-covered hills.

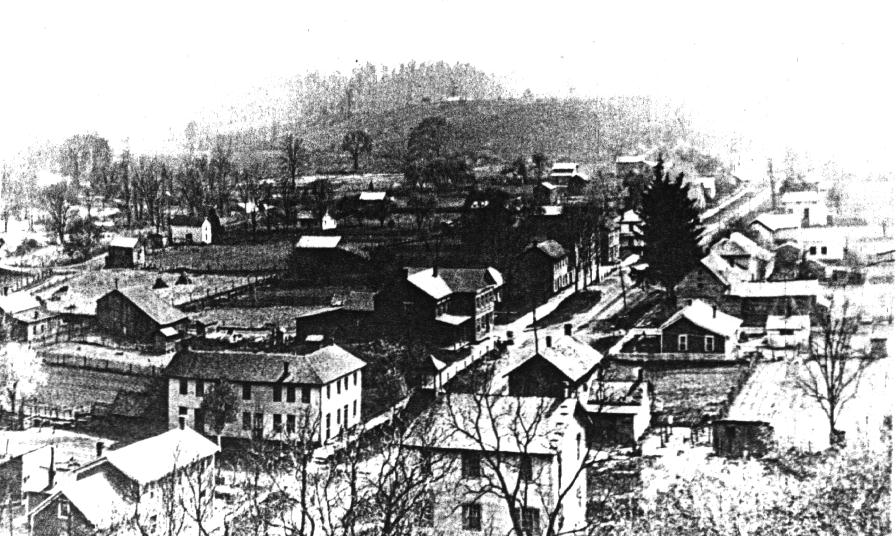
A photo of Newville from 1937

In 1811–12, John Frederick Herring built the second grist mill in Richland County. This mill was situate on the Clearfork, four miles west of Bellville, in what is now Perry township. Peter Weirick was employed to do the carpenter work, and while he was erecting the building, Mr. Herring drove to Baltimore with a six-horse team to procure burrs, wheels and gearings for the mill. After operating this mill for several years, Mr. Herring sold the same to Francis Baughman in 1815. In 1833, Mr. Baughman disposed of this property to John Hanawalt, who operated the same for about fifty years, and the mill is known in history as “Hanawalt’s.” This mill stood where the Lexington and Fredericktown road crosses the Clearfork.

After selling the mill west of Bellville, Mr. Herring entered another millsite, also on the Clearfork, fifteen miles down the stream, where he erected his second grist mill, and a few years later laid out the town of Newville.

The first settlers in Newville and vicinity were John Frederick Herring, Abraham Nye, Michael Hogan, Daniel Carpenter, George Armentrout and Luther Richard. Abraham Nye was the first tavern keeper, Daniel Stoner the first blacksmith and Michael Hogan the first merchant. Newville was named after Newville, Pennsylvania, the native place of the founder of the town.

At the time Newville was planned, the volume of water in the Clearfork of the Mohican was larger than it is now, and the pioneers were wont to found towns along streams of water, for water-powered mills and irrigation. Many of these historic locations never transitioned into townships or cities, however.

The early settlers of the Newville country came, mostly, along the old Wyandot trail, following up the Mohican and its Clearfork to Newville. Some of the later arrivals came along the Portage road - a military road cut through by a portion of General Harrison’s army in 1812. This road runs diagonally across Worthington township from the northeast to southwest. This was probably the first road in the township, and although it has been changed in certain places to conform to local conditions, it is still a public highway.

=== People ===
Samuel J. Kirkwood was one of the first school-teachers of the village. Mr. Kirkwood read law, became prosecuting attorney of Richland county, and after the close of his term, removed to Iowa, became governor of that state; was later a senator in the congress of the United States and closed his official career as a member of the Garfield cabinet.

Joseph Musgrave, once a Newville merchant, was a state senator from the Ashland district in 1856–57.

The late Major George F. Carpenter, lawyer and banker, was a son of the Daniel Carpenter, the promoter of the early business interests of Newville. Major Carpenter was one of the charter members of the Richland County Historical society and its first vice president.

Illinois Governor John Peter Altgeld was born in Newville.

=== Business ===
Daniel Carpenter, father of W. B. Carpenter, of Mansfield, was one of the principal promoters of the business and industrial interests of Newville. He had a store of general merchandise and founded and operated a tannery and an ashery. To further the business interests of the town, Daniel Carpenter founded an “ashery,” and manufactured another exportable commodity - pearl ash. His teams traversed the country for miles around, buying ashes of the farmers, thus adding to their income.

Among the early industries, was pennyroyal distilleries, dotted here and there over the pennyroyal regions of Ohio. Pennyroyal grew in profusion in the southern part of the country in the earliest days. It is a deciduous, herbaceous plant, aromatic, with a pungent taste. The pennyroyal after being gathered, was allowed to wilt until it would pack well, and was then tramped down carefully in a steam chest until it was full. The oil is in small globules on the under side of the leaf. When set free by steam, it passed into a condenser, into which a small stream of cold water was conducted. After being condensed, it was poured into an oil vat, nearly filled with water. The oil being lighter than the water, ran into the vessel and passed out into a receiver. Pennyroyal oil is used for its medicinal properties, and was thought by the pioneers to be valuable as a carminative remedy. The last pennyroyal distillery in this part of the county was Fisher’s at Palmyra, five miles south of Bellville. At the Fisher distillery, essence of peppermint was also distilled.

== Abandonment ==
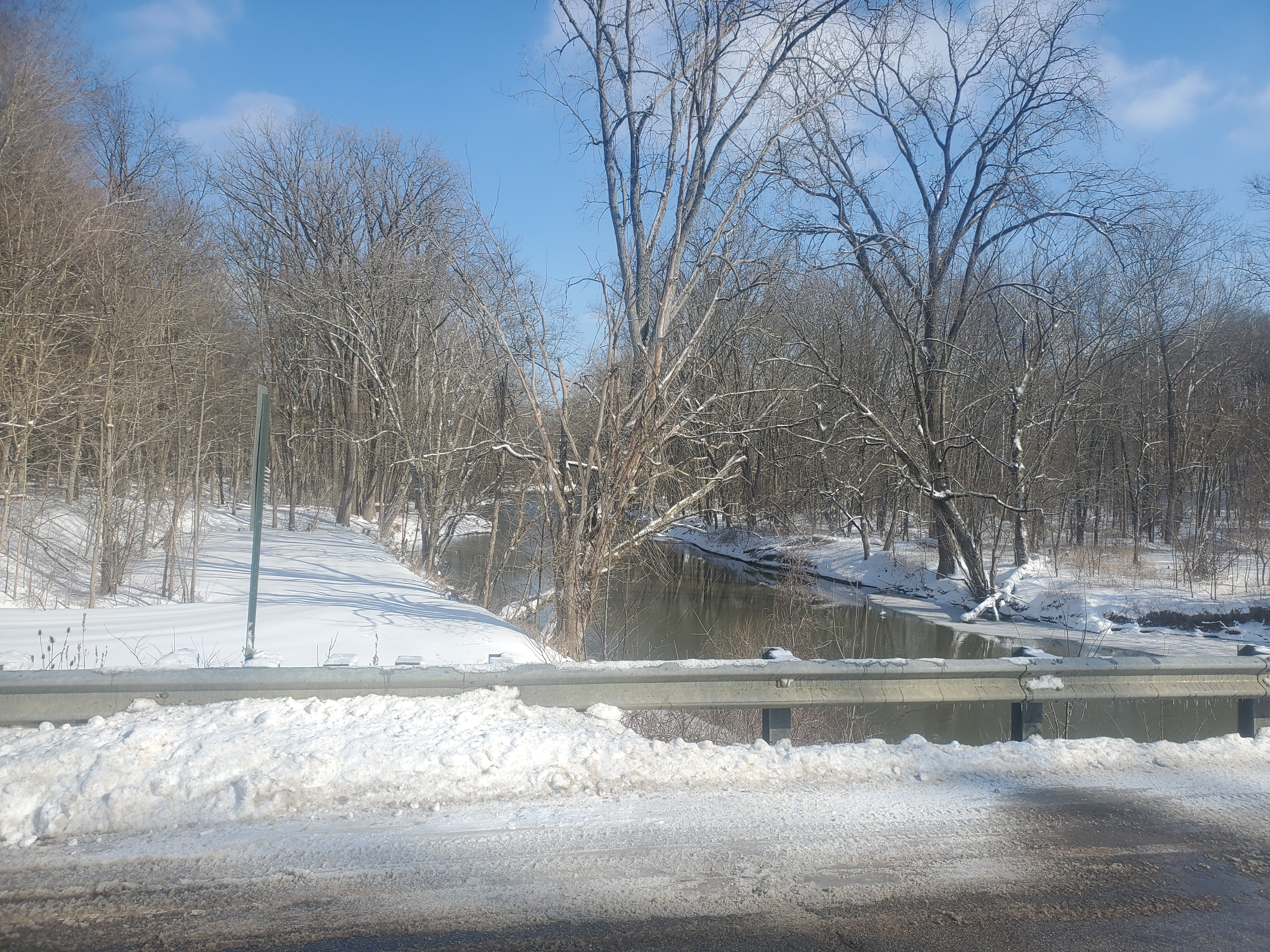
Newville in 2022.

In the 1940s, the U.S. Corps of Engineers built a dam on the Mohican river, that would under some circumstances, cause the town to be flooded, and it was ordered abandoned. Some of the foundations and buildings are still standing in the forest just west of the lake.
