= National Register of Historic Places listings in Knox County, Ohio =

Location of Knox County in Ohio

This is a list of the National Register of Historic Places listings in Knox County, Ohio.

This is intended to be a complete list of the properties and districts on the National Register of Historic Places in Knox County, Ohio, United States. The locations of National Register properties and districts for which the latitude and longitude coordinates are included below, may be seen in a Google map.

There are 45 properties and districts listed on the National Register in the county.

This National Park Service list is complete through NPS recent listings posted April 10, 2026.

== Current listings ==
	Name on the Register	Image	Date listed	Location	City or town	Description
1	Samuel Beers House	Samuel Beers House	November 6, 1979 (#79003855)	W. Sandusky St. 40°28′49″N 82°33′08″W	Fredericktown	
2	Bell House	Bell House	November 6, 1979 (#79003856)	53-57 N. Main St. 40°28′55″N 82°32′37″W	Fredericktown	No longer extant per Google Street View.
3	Brick Commercial Block	Brick Commercial Block	November 6, 1979 (#79003857)	Main and College Sts. 40°28′57″N 82°32′37″W	Fredericktown	
4	William Burch House	William Burch House	November 6, 1979 (#79003858)	Edgehill Dr. and Mount Vernon Ave. 40°28′49″N 82°32′26″W	Fredericktown	
5	Henry Cassell House	Henry Cassell House	November 6, 1979 (#79003859)	23 High St. 40°29′03″N 82°32′40″W	Fredericktown	
6	Christ Church at the Quarry	Christ Church at the Quarry	September 25, 1975 (#75001446)	East of Gambier at the junction of Quarry Chapel and Monroe Mills Rds. 40°23′16″N 82°22′15″W	College Township	
7	Wilson S. Cummings House	Wilson S. Cummings House	November 6, 1979 (#79003860)	Sandusky and Taylor Sts. 40°28′53″N 82°32′52″W	Fredericktown	
8	Elias Delashment House	Elias Delashment House	November 6, 1979 (#79003861)	2nd St. and Edgehill Dr. 40°28′53″N 82°32′27″W	Fredericktown	
9	Downtown Mount Vernon Historic District	Downtown Mount Vernon Historic District	February 3, 2012 (#11001092)	S. Main, S. Mulberry, S. Gay, High, Vine, Gambier, and Howard Sts., Ohio Ave, and Phillips Dr. 40°23′30″N 82°29′08″W	Mount Vernon	
10	Early Greek Revival Cottage	Early Greek Revival Cottage	November 6, 1979 (#79003862)	2nd and Chestnut Sts. 40°28′55″N 82°32′41″W	Fredericktown	
11	Early Greek Revival House	Early Greek Revival House	November 6, 1979 (#79003863)	Main and 2nd Sts. 40°28′55″N 82°32′35″W	Fredericktown	
12	East Gambier Street District	East Gambier Street District	November 18, 1976 (#76001459)	100-519 E. Gambier St. 40°23′28″N 82°28′48″W	Mount Vernon	
13	East High Street Historic District	East High Street Historic District	March 18, 1987 (#86003490)	Roughly bounded by E. Chestnut St., S. Catherine St., E. Vine St., and S. Gay St. 40°23′35″N 82°28′51″W	Mount Vernon	
14	Fredericktown Presbyterian Church	Fredericktown Presbyterian Church	November 6, 1979 (#79003864)	Main St. and Public Sq. 40°28′50″N 82°32′37″W	Fredericktown	
15	Gambier Historic District	Gambier Historic District	May 10, 2000 (#99001686)	Roughly bounded by State Route 229, Meadow Ln., Brooklyn St., and the northern village boundary 40°22′35″N 82°23′43″W	Gambier	
16	Gothic Revival House	Gothic Revival House	November 6, 1979 (#79003865)	High and N. Main Sts. 40°29′01″N 82°32′38″W	Fredericktown	
17	Greek Revival Commercial Building	Greek Revival Commercial Building	November 6, 1979 (#79003866)	67-69 N. Main St. 40°28′55″N 82°32′37″W	Fredericktown	No longer extant per Google Street View.
18	Hosack House	Hosack House	November 6, 1979 (#79003867)	W. College St. 40°28′56″N 82°32′38″W	Fredericktown	
19	Kenyon College	Kenyon College	December 6, 1975 (#75001447)	State Routes 229 and 308; 40°22′29″N 82°23′50″W	Gambier	
20	Dr. King House	Dr. King House	November 6, 1979 (#79003868)	Main and 2nd Sts. 40°28′54″N 82°32′37″W	Fredericktown	
21	Knox County Courthouse	Knox County Courthouse	June 4, 1973 (#73001484)	High St. 40°23′37″N 82°28′57″W	Mount Vernon	
22	Knox County Infirmary	Knox County Infirmary	July 10, 1986 (#86001567)	7516 Johnstown Rd., southwest of Mount Vernon; 40°20′52″N 82°33′07″W	Liberty Township	Destroyed in a fire on June 26, 2015.
23	Kokosing House	Kokosing House	February 19, 1985 (#85000450)	221 Kokosing Dr. 40°22′43″N 82°24′12″W	Gambier	
24	Richard and Ann Loveridge House	Richard and Ann Loveridge House	April 1, 2009 (#09000171)	12526 Lower Green Valley Rd., northwest of Mount Vernon; 40°25′11″N 82°31′34″W	Morris Township	
25	James McFarland House	James McFarland House	March 9, 1990 (#90000384)	7864 Newark Rd., south of Mount Vernon; 40°20′58″N 82°28′18″W	Clinton Township	
26	McKee-Pumphrey House	McKee-Pumphrey House	July 28, 1995 (#95000938)	165 N. Market St. 40°16′19″N 82°21′14″W	Martinsburg	
27	McLaughlin Mound	McLaughlin Mound	December 11, 1972 (#72001025)	Address Restricted	Mount Vernon	Also called Cemetery Mound
28	Mill Road Bowstring Bridge	Mill Road Bowstring Bridge	December 5, 1979 (#79001869)	Ariel-Foundation Park; 40°23′16″N 82°29′55″W	Mount Vernon	Formerly located on Mill Road east of Bladensburg
29	Mount Liberty Tavern	Mount Liberty Tavern	May 3, 1974 (#74001539)	U.S. Route 36 in Mount Liberty; 40°20′46″N 82°37′54″W	Liberty Township	
30	North Main-North Gay Streets Historic District	North Main-North Gay Streets Historic District	March 9, 1990 (#90000383)	Roughly bounded by Curtis St., N. Gay St., Public Sq., and N. Main St. 40°23′50″N 82°29′05″W	Mount Vernon	
31	Old Davis and Dague Grocery Store	Old Davis and Dague Grocery Store	November 6, 1979 (#79003869)	Main and College Sts. 40°28′57″N 82°32′35″W	Fredericktown	
32	Old Greek Revival Farmhouse	Old Greek Revival Farmhouse	November 6, 1979 (#79003870)	W. Sandusky St. 40°28′50″N 82°32′59″W	Fredericktown	Destroyed
33	Old Methodist Church	Old Methodist Church	November 6, 1979 (#79003871)	Sandusky St. and Public Sq. 40°28′51″N 82°32′34″W	Fredericktown	
34	Old Telephone Building	Old Telephone Building	November 6, 1979 (#79003872)	College and Chestnut Sts. 40°28′57″N 82°32′39″W	Fredericktown	
35	Pennsylvania Depot	Pennsylvania Depot	November 3, 1972 (#09000100)	S. Main St. 40°23′19″N 82°29′12″W	Mount Vernon	
36	Raleigh Mound	Raleigh Mound	October 14, 1975 (#75001445)	Mound St. 40°28′25″N 82°32′35″W	Fredericktown	Also known as the "Rowley Mound"
37	James Reed House	James Reed House	November 6, 1979 (#79003873)	E. College St. 40°28′57″N 82°32′30″W	Fredericktown	
38	Round Hill	Round Hill	December 12, 1976 (#76001460)	E. Pleasant and N. McKenzie Sts. 40°23′56″N 82°28′48″W	Mount Vernon	
39	Second Hosack House	Second Hosack House	November 6, 1979 (#79003874)	College and Chestnut Sts. 40°28′56″N 82°32′39″W	Fredericktown	
40	Sprague-Deaver House	Sprague-Deaver House	November 6, 1979 (#79003875)	Sandusky and Pleasant Sts. 40°28′51″N 82°32′33″W	Fredericktown	
41	Stackhouse Mound and Works	Stackhouse Mound and Works	June 18, 1973 (#73001483)	Off Montgomery Road east of Fredericktown; 40°28′51″N 82°31′46″W	Morris Township	Originally listed as "Braddock Mound and Works"
42	Enoch Thompson House	Enoch Thompson House	November 25, 1980 (#80003107)	South of Mount Vernon on State Route 661; 40°16′08″N 82°30′59″W	Miller Township	
43	Tuttle House	Tuttle House	July 12, 1976 (#76001458)	33 E. College St. 40°28′57″N 82°32′31″W	Fredericktown	
44	Woodward Opera House	Woodward Opera House	October 10, 1975 (#75001448)	Main and Vine Sts. 40°23′33″N 82°29′10″W	Mount Vernon	
45	Lyman Wright Building	Lyman Wright Building	November 6, 1979 (#79003876)	Main and 2nd Sts. 40°28′54″N 82°32′35″W	Fredericktown	

== See also ==
- List of National Historic Landmarks in Ohio
- Listings in neighboring counties: Ashland, Coshocton, Delaware, Holmes, Licking, Morrow, Richland
- National Register of Historic Places listings in Ohio
