= 1962 Ohio state highway renumbering =

This article is part of the highway renumbering series.
Alabama	1928, 1957
Arkansas	1926
California	1964
Colorado	1953, 1968
Connecticut	1932, 1963
Florida	1945
Indiana	1926
Iowa	1926, 1969
Louisiana	1955
Maine	1933
Massachusetts	1933
Minnesota	1934
Missouri	1926
Montana	1932
Nebraska	1926
Nevada	1976
New Jersey	1927, 1953
New Mexico	1926, 1988
New York	1927, 1930
North Carolina	1934, 1937, 1940, 1961
North Dakota	1926
Ohio	1923, 1927, 1962
Pennsylvania	1928, 1961
Puerto Rico	1953
South Carolina	1928, 1937
South Dakota	1927, 1975
Tennessee	1983
Texas	1939, 1990
Utah	1962, 1977
Virginia	1923, 1928, 1933, 1940, 1958
Washington	1964
Wisconsin	1926
Wyoming	1927

In 1962, the Ohio Department of Highways implemented the system of Interstate Highways that had been approved by the states in 1956.

The State Route numbers 70, 71, 74, 75, 77, 80, 90, 270, 271, 275, 277, 280, 290, 675, and 680 conflicted with new designations, so the State Routes with those numbers were renumbered.

New	Old	From	To
State Route 32	State Route 74	Cincinnati	Athens (subsequently extended to West Virginia border at Belpre)
State Route 41	State Route 70	Covington	Greenfield
State Route 41	State Route 41	Greenfield	Aberdeen
State Route 60	State Route 60	Vermilion	Loudonville (SR 60 overlaps SR 39 to east of Nashville)
State Route 60	State Route 77	East of Nashville (SR 60 overlaps SR 39 to east of Nashville)	West Virginia border in Marietta
State Route 93	State Route 93	Akron	West Lafayette
State Route 93	State Route 75	West Lafayette	Ironton
State Route 170	State Route 90	North Kingsville	Petersburg
State Route 170	State Route 170	Petersburg	Calcutta
State Route 183	State Route 80	Edinburg	Sandyville
State Route 207	State Route 277	Chillicothe	Mount Sterling
State Route 230	State Route 270	Perrysburg	Perrysburg (Fort Meigs State Memorial)
State Route 245	State Route 275	Rosewood	Marysville
State Route 296	State Route 290	Salem Township	Wayne Township
State Route 329	State Route 280	Trimble	Amesville
State Route 329	State Route 329	Amesville	Guysville
State Route 541	State Route 271	Martinsburg	Birmingham
State Route 571	State Route 71	Indiana	New Carlisle
State Route 681	State Route 680	Mineral	Reedsville
State Route 685	State Route 675	Buchtel	Trimble Township
State Route 751	State Route 75	Stone Creek	West Lafayette
State Route 753	State Route 753	Washington Court House	Greenfield
State Route 753	State Route 70	Greenfield	South of Cynthiana
State Route 754	State Route 77	Southwest of Shreve	East of Nashville

== Other renumberings due to new interstate designations after 1962 ==
- In 1972, due to the designation of I-76 in Ohio, Ohio State Route 76 had the part north of Beverly renumbered to Ohio State Route 83 and the rest became a southward extension of Ohio State Route 339.
- In 1973, due to the designation of I-670 in Ohio, Ohio State Route 670 had the portion east of Ohio State Route 313 become an extension of it and the rest was renumbered to Ohio State Route 761.

== See also ==
- Numbered highways in Ohio
