= List of former state routes in Ohio (271–352) =

This is a list of former state routes in Ohio since 1923 with route numbers from 271 through 352 inclusive.

== SR 271 (1930–1931) ==
State Route 271
- Location: Montpelier–Bridgewater Township
- Existed: 1930–1931

SR 271 was a state route that existed from 1930 until 1931 and was located entirely in Williams County. When it was created, it ran along previously unnumbered roads from the village of Montpelier to Bridgewater Township at US 20. After its two years in existence, the entire route became a part of US 20S. Today, the entire route is a section of SR 576.

== SR 271 (1932–1962) ==
State Route 271
- Location: Martinsburg–Birmingham
- Existed: 1932–1962

SR 271 was a state highway through east-central Ohio. When it was first designated in 1932, it ran from Coshocton to North Salem taking over a part of SR 95. In 1935, the route was vastly expanded west to include all of the former SR 309 from Tunnel Hill to Coshocton, unnumbered roads from New Guilford to Tunnel Hill, and part of SR 206 from Martinsburg to New Guilford. The route experienced one more extension, this time at its eastern terminus to act as a spur to the community of Birmingham. No major changes would occur to SR 271 until 1962 when the route was renumbered to SR 541 due to the new Interstate highway, I-271.

== SR 272 ==
State Route 272
- Location: Canton
- Existed: 1930–1961

SR 272 was a 1.2-mile-long (1.9 km) state highway located north of downtown Canton. The entire route followed Canton's 30th Street and connected SR 8 and US 62/SR 43. The route was in existence from 1930 until 1961, though for its last year as a state route, SR 272 was marked on the official Ohio highway map. After 1961, US 62 was brought onto a new freeway alignment just south of 30th Street. SR 272 was deleted from the system as a result.

Browse numbered routes
← SR 271	OH	→ SR 273

== SR 275 (1930–1962) ==
State Route 275
- Location: Rosewood–Marysville
- Existed: 1930–1962

SR 275 was a state route stretching from Rosewood to just west of Marysville. The first section of SR 275 that was designated was its segment from West Liberty to Marysville at SR 32 (later US 33); it was signed in 1930. In 1937, the route was extended west to SR 29 near Rosewood. After 1962, the SR 275 designation was replaced by SR 245 due to the signing of I-275 near Cincinnati.

== SR 277 (1930–1962) ==
State Route 277
- Location: Chillicothe–Mount Sterling
- Existed: 1930–1962

SR 277 was the predecessor to SR 207 and ran from north of Chillicothe at SR 104 to Mount Sterling. The route when it was created in 1930 originally had its northern terminus at US 22 in Atlanta. The route was extended to its long-time northern terminus in 1935. No major changes would occur to the route until the route was renumbered to SR 207 in 1962 due to the construction of I-277 in Akron.

== SR 280 (1930–1962) ==
State Route 280
- Location: Amesville–Trimble
- Existed: 1930–1962

SR 280 was a state highway that existed from 1930 until 1962 and traveled between Amesville and Trimble. The route remained along this alignment for its entire 32-year history. In 1962, due to the building of I-280 in the Toledo area, all of SR 280 became part of an extension of SR 329 which previously ended at US 50 Alt. in nearby Bern Township.

== SR 283 (1931) ==
State Route 283
- Location: Holland
- Existed: 1931–1931

SR 283 was a short-lived designation for a 1.2-mile-long (1.9 km) state route near Holland. This designation had replaced SR 223 which had to be renumbered due to the addition of US 223 in the state. Within one year, the route number was changed again, this time to SR 326.

== SR 288 (1931–1940) ==
State Route 288
- Location: Willowick–Willoughby
- Existed: 1931–1940

SR 288 was the predecessor to SR 640 in Lake County. The route was designated in 1931 on the Willowick–Willoughby route it followed for its entire history. In 1940 for unknown reasons, the route number was changed to SR 640.

== SR 289 (1931–1937) ==
State Route 289
- Location: New Haven
- Existed: 1931–1937

SR 289 was a short state route entirely in New Haven Township. The route existed from 1931 until 1937 and acted as a connector from SR 61 to the former SR 194. After 1937, the entire route became the northernmost 1.18 miles (1.90 km) of SR 598 following its extension to Huron County.

== SR 290 (1932–1962) ==
State Route 290
- Location: Salem Township–Wayne Township
- Existed: 1932–1962

SR 290 was the state route that became SR 296 in 1962. The route throughout most of its history consisted of a routing starting north of Urbana and traveling east to the community of Middletown within Wayne Township, Champaign County. According to the 1932 official Ohio state highway map, SR 290 traveled along the former SR 275 between West Liberty and Middletown even though prior and successive maps show this segment as SR 275. By 1933, SR 290 was routed from US 68 near Kings Creek to SR 275 in Middletown. In 1937, the route was extended slightly west to end at SR 29 (originally SR 54). After 1962 when Ohio routes that shared numbers with proposed Interstate highways were renumbered, SR 290 became SR 296 because of the proposed Interstate 290 in Cleveland (which later was built as I-490).

Browse numbered routes
← I-290	OH	→ SR 291

== SR 291 (1932–1945) ==
State Route 291
- Location: Liberty Township
- Existed: 1932–1945

SR 291 was a two-mile-long (3.2 km) alternate state route to SR 69 in Liberty Township, Hardin County. While SR 69 shared a one-mile-long (1.6 km) concurrency with US 30S east before turning north, SR 291 continued north from the western SR 69/US 30S intersection before making a 90-degree turn to the east. The route was in existence from 1932 until 1945.

== SR 296 (1932–1936) ==
State Route 296
- Location: Reedtown–Bellevue
- Existed: 1932–1936

SR 296 was a state route that connected SR 4 on the Seneca–Huron County line to the village of Bellevue. The route, which was about seven miles (11 km) long, followed the county line for its entire length. The route was created in 1932 and was replaced in 1936 by an extended SR 269.

== SR 297 (1932–1938) ==
State Route 297
- Location: Wayne–Bradner
- Existed: 1932–1938

SR 297 was a short spur route that connected the village of Wayne to US 6 near Bradner. The route, which had been asphalt-paved for its entire history, was created in 1932 and existed until 1938 when it was absorbed into a lengthened SR 281, the number the road still carries today.

== SR 298 ==
State Route 298
- Location: Chatfield–Willard
- Existed: 1932–1967

SR 298 was a state road that connected SR 4 north of Chatfield to Willard at US 224 and SR 194. The route when it was created in 1932 only consisted of the segment from its western terminus at SR 4 to the village of New Washington. In 1938, the route was extended east and north through Gardner and Celeryville to end at US 224 and SR 194 near Willard. The route would follow this alignment until after 1967 when all of SR 298 and SR 194 was replaced by SR 103 which had been extended from its former end in Chatfield.

Browse numbered routes
← SR 297	OH	→ SR 299

== SR 299 ==
State Route 299
- Location: Milan–Huron
- Existed: 1932–1966

SR 299 was a state route that traveled from Milan to Huron. The route's southern terminus was at US 250 and SR 13 just north of Milan and its northern terminus was at US 6 and SR 2 in downtown Huron. The route maintained this routing throughout its history. Prior to 1966, SR 13 followed US 250 into Sandusky but in 1966, SR 13 was rerouted to follow the entire length of SR 299 thus deleting this number from the system.

Browse numbered routes
← SR 298	OH	→ SR 300

== SR 309 (1932–1934) ==
State Route 309
- Location: Tunnel Hill–Roscoe
- Existed: 1932–1934

SR 309 was a state route that ran from the community of Tunnel Hill to the now-defunct village of Roscoe. During its two years of existence from 1932 until 1934, the route was entirely a gravel road. After 1934, SR 309 became one of many state routes and local roads that became a part of a greatly extended SR 271 that stretched from Martinsburg to North Salem. Today, all of the former SR 309 is a part of SR 541.

== SR 311 ==
State Route 311
- Location: Brookville–Arlington
- Existed: March 9, 1932–1964

SR 311 was a short spur state route from the village of Brookville to the community of Arlington (within Clay Township) at US 40. This alignment of the route would be its route throughout its entire history from 1932 until 1964. As I-70 was built through the area in the early 1960s, the state route was removed from the system though it did feature an interchange with the new Interstate. Today, the portion of the former state route outside of the village limits is a part of Montgomery County Road 6.

Browse numbered routes
← SR 310	OH	→ SR 312

== SR 318 ==
State Route 318
- Location: Jackson Center–Uniopolis
- Existed: 1932–1936

SR 318 was a state route through northeastern Shelby County and eastern Auglaize County. Created in 1932, the route's southern terminus was at SR 274 in Jackson Center. The route traveled north to SR 32 (modern-day US 33). SR 318 formed a concurrency with SR 32 west to Saint Johns before SR 318 turned north and ended in Uniopolis at SR 67. No changes would occur to the routing until 1936 when the entire route was replaced by SR 65 which had been extended south from Lima.

Browse numbered routes
← SR 317	OH	→ SR 319

== SR 326 (1932–1933) ==
State Route 326
- Location: Holland
- Existed: 1932–1934

SR 326 was the final designation for a 1.2-mile-long (1.9 km) state route near Holland. The route had been renumbered from SR 283 in 1932 but after 1934, the route was removed from the state highway system altogether.

== SR 326 (1935–1967) ==
State Route 326
- Location: Marietta
- Existed: 1935–1967

SR 326 was a short state route in and around Marietta, Washington County. The route became a state road in 1935 but was unlabeled on Ohio state highway maps until 1946. The route began in downtown Marietta as Washington Street before heading into the hills north of the downtown as Cisler Drive and ending at SR 375. The route would be in existence along this routing until after 1967 when it was reverted to local control.

== SR 333 (1932–1937) ==
State Route 333
- Location: Dillonvale–Smithfield
- Existed: 1932–1937

SR 333 was a state route running from Dillonvale to Smithfield in Jefferson County. The route existed from 1932 until 1937. After 1937, the road became a part of SR 152, the route that exists on the route today.

== SR 333 (1946–1962) ==
State Route 333
- Location: Sylvania
- Length: 3.0 mi (4.8 km)
- Existed: 1946–1962

SR 333 was a state route in the vicinity of Sylvania. The route started in the Central Avenue Park neighborhood of Sylvania Township at US 20 and SR 120 and traveled north on North Holland Sylvania Road. SR 333 curved to the northwest as it entered the city limits of Sylvania. In downtown Sylvania, the route ended at the intersection of Main and Monroe Streets. US 223 traveled east and north of this point. The route was created in 1946 when SR 120 was rerouted from this road onto a more southerly alignment. SR 333 would be deleted by 1964 having been replaced by new freeways, US 23 as the predominantly north-south bypass of the route and I-475 serving as another alternate route.

Major intersections

The entire route was in Lucas County.

Location	mi	km	Destinations	Notes
Sylvania Township	0.0	0.0	US 20 / SR 120 / Central Avenue	
Sylvania	3.0	4.8	US 223 (Monroe Street) / Main Street	
1.000 mi = 1.609 km; 1.000 km = 0.621 mi

Browse numbered routes
← SR 332	OH	→ SR 334

== SR 334 (1932–1937) ==
State Route 334
- Location: Leesville–Amsterdam
- Existed: 1932–1937

SR 334 was a state route in Carroll and Jefferson Counties in eastern Ohio. From 1932 until 1934, the route was a spur from SR 43 in Amsterdam to Bergholz. In 1935, the route was extended west to Perrysville at SR 332. For its final year in existence, 1937, SR 334 was extended west further to Leesville at SR 212 through the segment from Amsterdam to Bergholz was replaced by SR 164 at this time. By 1938, all of SR 334 became a part of SR 164.

== SR 336 ==
State Route 336
- Location: Cecil–Emmet
- Existed: 1932–1945

SR 336 was a state route in northwestern Ohio and existed from 1932 until 1945. At the time of its creation, the entire length of SR 336 was a former section of US 127. In that year, US 127 was moved onto an alignment closer to the Maumee River (including a concurrency with US 24) leaving SR 336 on the former segment. The route started at US 127 east of Cecil and traveled east before sharply turning to the north at the community of Emmet. SR 336 ended at the intersection which was also the eastern end of the US 127 / US 24 concurrency. After 1945, the entire route was deleted from the state highway system.

Browse numbered routes
← SR 335	OH	→ SR 338

== SR 337 ==
State Route 337
- Location: Antiquity–Racine
- Existed: 1932–1936

SR 337 was a short state route along the Ohio River in southeastern Meigs County. The two-mile-long (3.2 km) spur route ran from the community of Antiquity to Racine at SR 124. SR 337 was created in 1932 but was fully absorbed into SR 338 by 1937.

== SR 338 ==
State Route 338
- Location: Racine–Portland
- Length: 2.32 mi (3.73 km)
- Existed: 1932–by 2012

SR 338 was a state highway along the banks of the Ohio River in southeastern Meigs County. In 1932, the route was created as a spur from Letart Falls to SR 124 near Rolandus. By 1937, the route extended from Racine to SR 124 south of Portland. The route would follow this 21.7-mile-long (34.9 km) alignment for over sixty years until a truncation in 2003 left it at a length of 2.32 miles (3.73 km) from the Ravenswood Bridge to SR 124 south of Portland. The route was deleted between 2008 and 2012 and today, most of the route was abandoned due to landslides into the river.

== SR 341 ==
State Route 341
- Location: Beach City
- Existed: 1933–1941

SR 341 was a short state route near Beach City. The two-mile-long (3.2 km) highway was a connector from SR 212 east of Beach City to US 21. The route existed from 1933 until 1941 and was not replaced by another state route.

Browse numbered routes
← SR 340	OH	→ SR 342

== SR 346 ==
State Route 346
- Location: Wellston–Albany
- Length: 20.77 mi (33.43 km)
- Existed: 1935–1983

SR 346 was a state route in eastern Ohio that became a part of the Appalachian Highway in the 1970s. When it was created in 1935, SR 346 ran from SR 160 in Radcliff to SR 143 in Mount Blanco. The route would be on this alignment for 35 years until 1970 when the Appalachian Highway was opened through southern Ohio. The route was extended to a length of 20.8 miles (33.5 km) running from SR 124 south of Wellston to US 50 southwest of Albany. After 1983, the entire Appalachian Highway was assigned SR 32 therefore the SR 346 was deleted from this section of the divided highway.

Browse numbered routes
← SR 345	OH	→ SR 347

== SR 351 ==
State Route 351
- Location: Marietta
- Existed: 1935–1969

SR 351 was a bypass of Marietta in Washington County. The route existed from 1935 until 1969. The route started in the eastern Marietta suburb of Norwood at US 50 Alternate and SR 7 (Pike Street) and headed north on Acme Street. At its intersection with SR 26 (Greene Street), SR 351 had a two-block concurrency west along SR 26 before turning right onto Colegate Drive. The route curved around the northeastern limits of Marietta intersecting SR 375 along the way. SR 351 ended at an intersection with SR 60 (Muskingum Drive) at the Muskingum River.

Browse numbered routes
← SR 350	OH	→ SR 352

== SR 352 ==
State Route 352
- Location: Beach City–Bolivar
- Existed: 1935–1938

SR 352 was a state route in southern Stark County and northern Tuscarawas County. The route started at US 250 west of Beach City, traveled through Beach City, and ended in Bolivar near Fort Laurens. The route was only in existence for about three years from 1935 to 1938 when it was fully replaced by SR 212 which was extended from Sherrodsville.

Browse numbered routes
← SR 351	OH	→ SR 353
