= Ohio State Route 271 =

State Route 271

Route information
- Maintained by ODOT

Location
- Country: United States
- State: Ohio

Highway system
- Ohio State Highway System; Interstate; US; State; Scenic
← I-271	→ SR 272

In Ohio, State Route 271 may refer to:

- Interstate 271 in Ohio, the only Ohio highway numbered 271 since about 1962
- Ohio State Route 271 (1930), now US 20A north of Montpelier
- Ohio State Route 271 (1930s-1960s), now SR 541
