= Ohio State Route 206 =

State highway in central Ohio, US

State Route 206

Route information
- Maintained by ODOT
- Length: 15.23 mi (24.51 km)
- Existed: 1924–present

Major junctions
- South end: SR 541 near Bladensburg
- US 36 near Nellie
- North end: US 62 near Brinkhaven

Location
- Country: United States
- State: Ohio
- Counties: Coshocton, Holmes

Highway system
- Ohio State Highway System; Interstate; US; State; Scenic
← SR 205	→ SR 207

State Route 206 (SR 206) is a north–south state highway in central Ohio, a U.S. state. The southern terminus of State Route 206 is at a T-intersection with State Route 541 approximately 6.50 miles (10.46 km) east of the unincorporated community of Bladensburg. Its northern terminus is 3.50 miles (5.63 km) east of the village of Brinkhaven at its junction with U.S. Route 62.

== Route description ==
State Route 206 passes through the northwestern quadrant of Coshocton County and enters into the southwestern corner of Holmes County. There are no segments of State Route 206 that are included within the National Highway System.

== History ==
State Route 206 was established in 1924. Its original path followed the current stretch of State Route 229 from Mount Vernon east to its eastern terminus at U.S. Route 36, and U.S. Route 36 for a short distance from State Route 229 to the current western junction of U.S. Route 36 and State Route 206. Two years later, State Route 206 was re-aligned. Now, State Route 206 followed the current State Route 541 from Martinsburg to the current southern terminus of State Route 206, and then the current routing of State Route 206 from that point northerly to the eastern junction of what is now State Route 715 (then known as State Route 42).

In 1935, State Route 206 was shortened, as the portion along what is now State Route 541 was re-designated as State Route 271. At this point, the highway now ran from its current southern terminus to the eastern State Route 715 junction, which as of 1935 was designated as U.S. Route 36. Then, in 1937, State Route 206 took on its current shape as it was extended northerly to its current northern terminus at U.S. Route 62 east of Brinkhaven.

== Major intersections ==
County	Location	mi	km	Destinations	Notes
Coshocton	Perry Township	0.00	0.00	SR 541	
Coshocton	Newcastle Township	3.41	5.49	US 36 west	Southern end of US 36 concurrency
Coshocton	Newcastle Township	3.85	6.20	US 36 east	Northern end of US 36 concurrency
Coshocton	Newcastle Township	5.98	9.62	SR 715 east	Southern end of SR 715 concurrency
Coshocton	Newcastle Township	6.63	10.67	SR 715 west	Northern end of SR 715 concurrency
Holmes	Richland Township	15.23	24.51	US 62 / CR 25 – Millersburg, Danville	
1.000 mi = 1.609 km; 1.000 km = 0.621 mi: Concurrency terminus
