= Samuel Beers House =

Historic residence in Ohio, US

- U.S. National Register of Historic Places
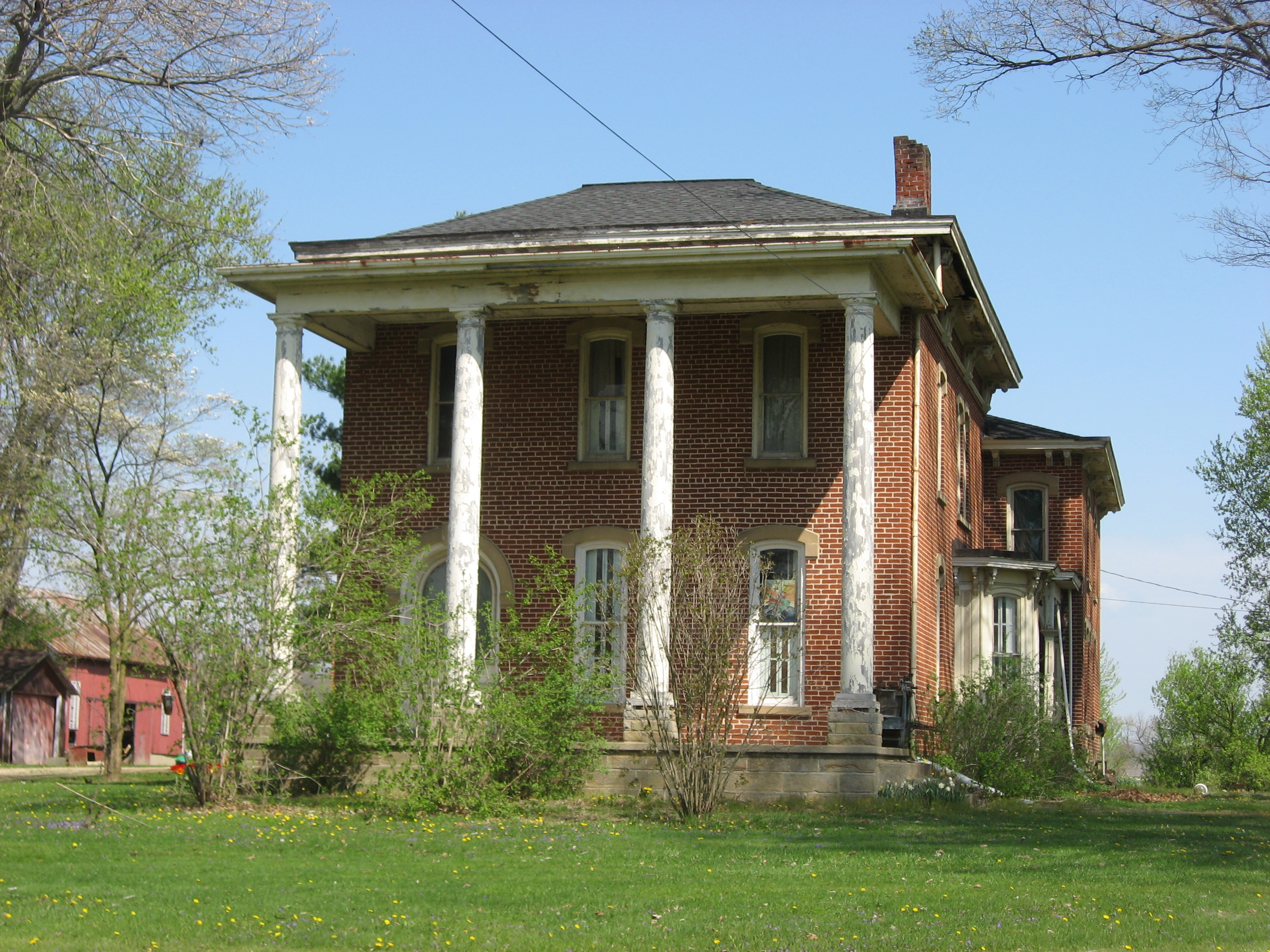

- Location within Ohio
- Location: W. Sandusky St., Fredericktown, Knox County, Ohio, United States
- Coordinates: 40.480278°N 82.552222°W
- Built: c. 1870
- Architectural style: Italianate
- MPS: Fredericktown MRA
- NRHP reference No.: 79003855
- Added to NRHP: November 6, 1979

Samuel Beers House is a historic residence in Fredericktown, Ohio, U.S.. It is listed on the National Register of Historic Places since 1979, for the architecture. It has also been referred to as the John Beers House.

== History ==
It was constructed in c. 1870 for John Beers (1807–1878), who was from New Jersey and was once a large landowner and farmer in Knox County, Ohio. The house was built in the Italianate style, and using bricks with a sandstone foundation; both the style and materials were unusual for the area. It contains a two story portico with four columns, and an arched front door.

== See also ==
- National Register of Historic Places listings in Knox County, Ohio
