= Mound Cemetery =

Mound Cemetery, Cemetery Mound, or Mound Cemetery Site may refer to:

- McLaughlin Mound, also called Cemetery Mound, Mount Vernon, Ohio
- Mound Cemetery (Marietta, Ohio)
- Mound Cemetery (Arkansas City, Arkansas)
- Mound Cemetery (Racine, Wisconsin)
- Mound Cemetery Mound (Chester, Ohio)

== See also ==
- Borre mound cemetery
- Indian Mound Cemetery
