= Kennedy Stone House =

Historic house in Ohio, United States

- U.S. National Register of Historic Places
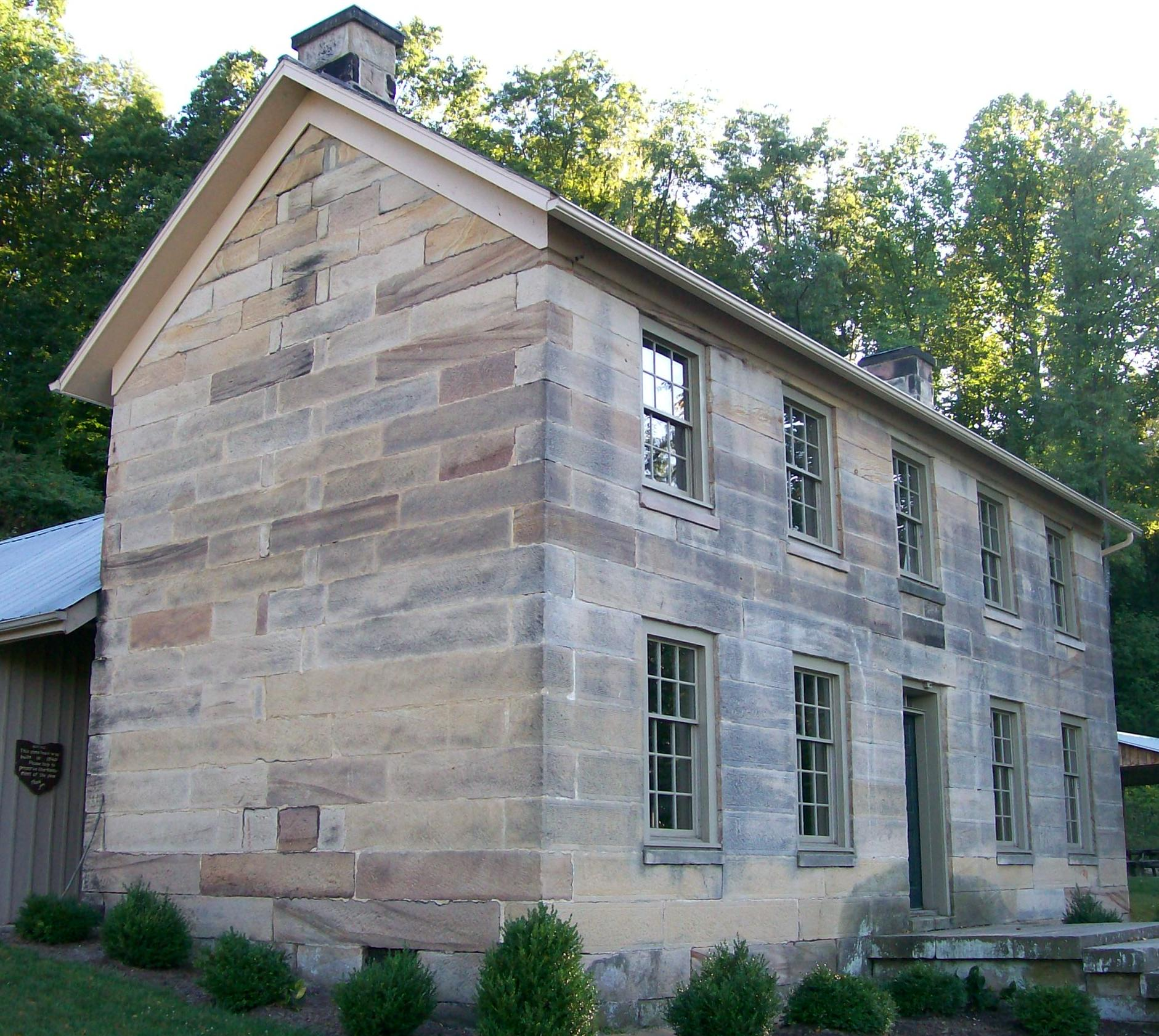
- The Stone House in 2009.

- Location within Ohio Location within the United States
- Nearest city: North Salem, Ohio
- Coordinates: 40°7′41″N 81°29′59″W
- Area: 1 acre (0.40 ha)
- Built: 1837
- Architectural style: Federal
- NRHP reference No.: 75001412
- Added to NRHP: October 03, 1975

The Kennedy Stone House is located in Salt Fork State Park in Guernsey County, Ohio. The house and surrounding structures were placed on the National Register on October 3, 1975.

== History ==
In 1837, Irish native Benjamin Kennedy bought 80-acre (320,000 m^{2}) of land from Solomon Sturgis, who had obtained it as a land grant for military service. Kennedy appears to have arranged for construction almost immediately after buying the land; stone was used for the walls, and slate covers the roof. Kennedy's descendants owned and inhabited the house for more than a century; the state government bought the land in 1942, but Kennedys were permitted to continue living in the house. When Salt Fork State Park was being developed, the house could no longer be inhabited, and its final resident, Benjamin's great-great-grandson Don Kennedy, moved out in 1966.

In 1975 it was placed on the National Register and remained in its abandoned state. The roof was damaged during a storm when a tree branch fell through the roof, but the parks crew replaced it. This started a movement to fix the house and it was named the Guernsey County Bicentennial Commission Legacy Program. Local volunteers cleaned up the area and soon transformed themselves into Friends for the Restoration of The Kennedy Stone House. Major restoration was done from 2000 to 2002.

The organization transformed itself into the Friends of the Kennedy Stone House Salt Fork State Park and maintains the house as a museum. One of the programs the organization performs is the docent program, where retirees or history students from Muskingum College occupy a cabin above the stone house and are charged as caretakers to the property.

== Exterior ==
The stone house contains a central door reached by a flight of stairs and a small porch. The porch was once covered over during the Victorian era and contained columns and a balcony. To either side of the door are two rectangular windows. The second floor contains five windows in line over the first floor windows. The gabled roof is pierced at either end by a large stone chimney.

The house being only one room deep meant during the family's growth a new addition would be made. A two-story wooden-frame wing was added to the rear of the building and contained the summer kitchen and several bedrooms. This addition would not last and today's reconstruction only includes the summer kitchen.

A root cellar is located to the right of the house and built of thick stone blocks. The sides of the cellar are lined with dirt and plants to allow for cooler internal temperatures. The ceiling is penetrated by two diamond-shaped holes for ventilation and light. The well is now covered over and a natural spring has been capped.
