= Ohio State Route 229 =

State highway in central Ohio, US

State Route 229

Route information
- Maintained by ODOT
- Length: 50.97 mi (82.03 km)
- Existed: 1931–present

Major junctions
- West end: SR 47 near Waldo
- US 23 near Waldo; US 42 in Ashley; US 36 / SR 3 in Mount Vernon; US 62 near Martinsburg
- East end: US 36 near Nellie

Location
- Country: United States
- State: Ohio
- Counties: Delaware, Marion, Morrow, Knox, Coshocton

Highway system
- Ohio State Highway System; Interstate; US; State; Scenic
← SR 228	→ SR 230

State Route 229 (SR 229) is an east-west state highway in the central part of the U.S. state of Ohio. The western terminus of State Route 229 is at a T-intersection with State Route 47 just 0.25 miles (0.40 km) south of the village limits of Waldo. Its eastern terminus is more than 50 miles (80 km) to the east at a T-intersection with U.S. Route 36 about 5.5 miles (8.9 km) west of the village of Nellie.

== Route description ==
State Route 229 runs through portions of five counties: Marion, Delaware, Morrow, Knox and Coshocton. No part of this state highway is included within the National Highway System, A network of highways considered extremely important for the economy and security of the country.

== History ==
When it was first established in 1930, State Route 229 ran from its junction with State Route 61 west of Marengo to downtown Mount Vernon. In 1937, the highway was extended on the western end to a new endpoint at U.S. Route 23 south of Waldo. Two years later, State Route 229 was extended again, this time on the east side, to its current eastern terminus in extreme western Coshocton County west of Nellie at what was then State Route 715, which would later trade alignments with U.S. Route 36. By 1974, the route officially took on the routing that it has today when it was extended slightly on the western end, running a short distance west of the U.S. Route 23 expressway before turning north onto the former two-lane alignment of U.S. Route 23, and following that roadway up to its current western terminus just south of Waldo where State Route 47 comes in and takes over the old routing of U.S. Route 23.

== Major intersections ==
County	Location	mi	km	Destinations	Notes
Marion	Waldo Township	0.00	0.00	SR 47	
Delaware	Marlboro Township	1.30	2.09	US 23	
Delaware	Ashley	8.01	12.89	US 42	
Morrow	Bennington Township	14.91	24.00	SR 61	
Morrow	South Bloomfield Township	21.38	34.41	SR 314 north	Western end of SR 314 concurrency
Morrow	South Bloomfield Township	21.55	34.68	SR 314 south	Eastern end of SR 314 concurrency
Morrow	South Bloomfield Township	22.03	35.45	SR 656 south	Northern terminus of SR 656
Knox	Clinton Township	32.17	51.77	US 36 west / SR 3 south	Western end of US 36/SR 3 concurrency
Knox	Mount Vernon	33.13	53.32	SR 13 north	Western end of SR 13 concurrency
Knox	Mount Vernon	33.25	53.51	US 36 east / SR 3 north	Eastern end of US 36/SR 3 concurrency; traffic circle
Knox	Mount Vernon	33.37	53.70	SR 13 south	Eastern end of SR 13 concurrency
Knox	Gambier	38.02	61.19	SR 308 north	Southern terminus of SR 308
Knox	Harrison Township	44.16	71.07	US 62	
Coshocton	Newcastle Township	50.97	82.03	US 36	
1.000 mi = 1.609 km; 1.000 km = 0.621 mi: Concurrency terminus
