= Tuttle House (Fredericktown, Ohio) =

Historic building in Knox County, Ohio, U.S.

- U.S. National Register of Historic Places
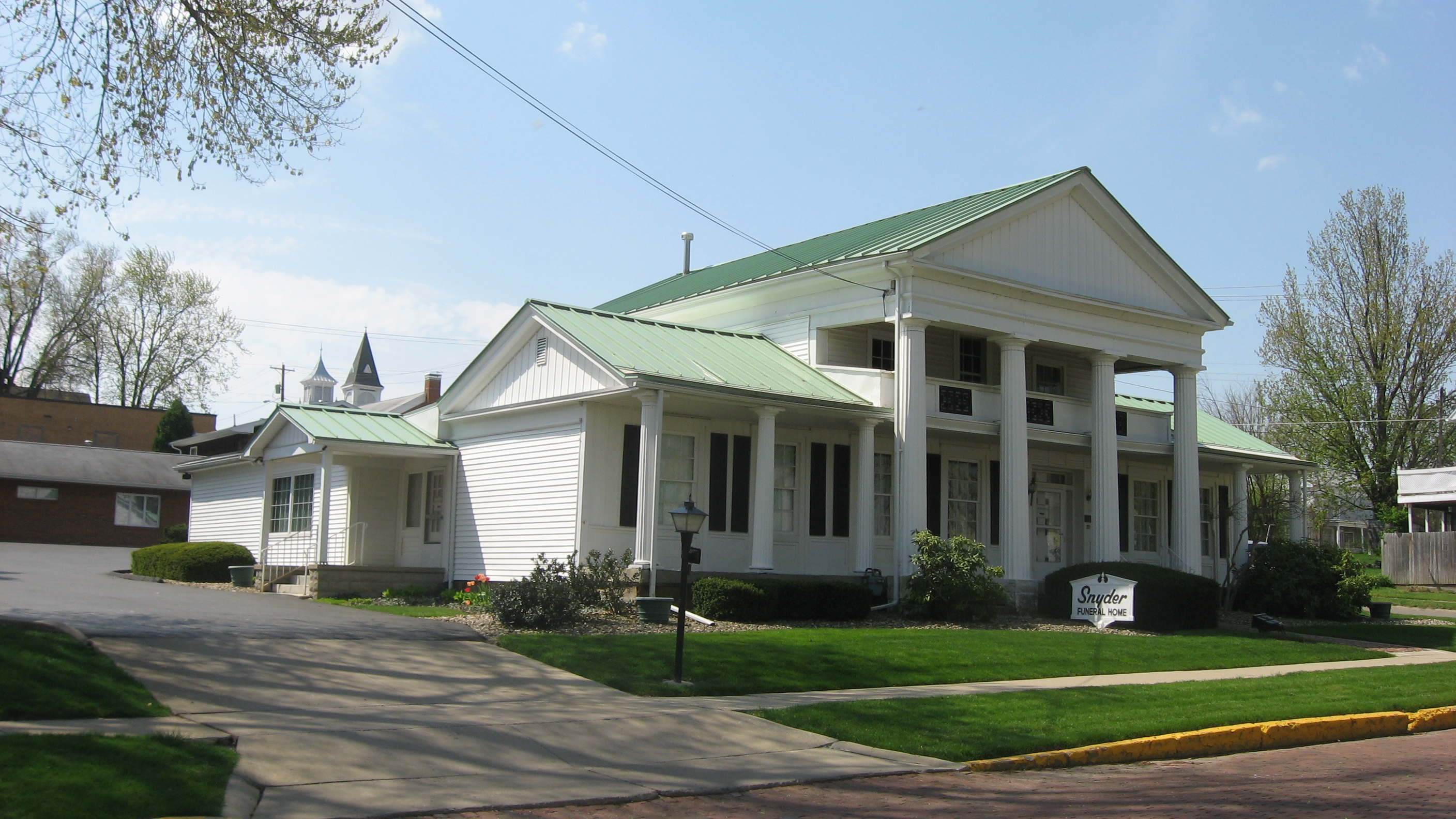

- Location within Ohio
- Location: 33 East College Street, Fredericktown, Knox County, Ohio, U.S.
- Coordinates: 40.4825°N 82.541944°W
- Area: less than one acre
- Built: c. 1846
- Architectural style: Greek Revival
- MPS: Fredericktown MRA (AD)
- NRHP reference No.: 76001458
- Added to NRHP: July 12, 1976

The Tuttle House is an historic residence turned funeral home in Fredericktown, Ohio, built in c. 1846 by S. S. Tuttle, an early settler and prominent local figure. It is also known as the Snyder Funeral Home, and the Tuttle–Snyder House. Tuttle House has been listed on the National Register of Historic Places since 1976. It is at 33 East College Street in Fredericktown, Ohio.

This house features Greek Revival architecture, including a central two-story section with a prominent pediment supported by four large Doric columns. The central section is flanked by symmetrical one-story wings on each side, with front porches supported by smaller columns.

== See also ==
- National Register of Historic Places listings in Knox County, Ohio
