= Ohio State Route 541 =

State highway in central Ohio, US

State Route 541

Route information
- Maintained by ODOT
- Length: 52.28 mi (84.14 km)
- Existed: 1962–present

Major junctions
- West end: US 62 in Martinsburg
- SR 16 / SR 83 in Coshocton
- East end: I-77 in Liberty Township

Location
- Country: United States
- State: Ohio
- Counties: Knox, Coshocton, Guernsey

Highway system
- Ohio State Highway System; Interstate; US; State; Scenic
← SR 540	→ SR 542
← I-271	→ SR 272

State Route 541 (SR 541) is a 52.28-mile-long (84.14 km) state highway in central Ohio. The route's western terminus is US 62 in Martinsburg and its eastern terminus is at exit 54 of I-77 in Liberty Township.

== History ==
SR 541 came about due to the renumbering of what was State Route 271. In 1962, the Ohio Department of Transportation (ODOT) renumbered state highways that shared numbers with proposed Interstate Highways in the state; in this case, the highway shared a number with Interstate 271, a proposed highway in the Cleveland area.

SR 271 was first designated in 1932 on a route between Coshocton and North Salem at US 21, a route formerly occupied by SR 95. By 1935, SR 271 took over the entire alignment of what was SR 309 between Coshocton and Tunnel Hill, local roads, and SR 206 between Martinsburg and New Guilford. In 1937, the route was extended east to the community of Birmingham. Between 1967 and 1969, with the completion of I-77, the eastern terminus of what was now the renumbered SR 541 was moved back to the North Salem area, but this time at an interchange with the newly built I-77.

== Major intersections ==
County	Location	mi	km	Destinations	Notes
Knox	Martinsburg	0.00	0.00	US 62 / SR 586 (Market Street / West Liberty Street) – Utica, Fallsburg, Danville	
Coshocton	Perry Township	10.49	16.88	SR 206 north	Southern terminus of SR 206
Coshocton	Perry Township	13.49	21.71	SR 79	
Coshocton	Bedford Township	17.52	28.20	SR 60 south – Dresden	Western end of SR 60 concurrency
Coshocton	Bedford Township	17.65	28.40	SR 60 north – Warsaw	Eastern end of SR 60 concurrency
Coshocton	Coshocton	28.10	45.22	SR 16 / SR 83 to US 36	Interchange
Coshocton	Linton Township	38.40	61.80	SR 93 north – West Lafayette	Western end of SR 93 concurrency
Coshocton	Linton Township	40.51	65.19	SR 93 south – Adamsville	Eastern end of SR 93 concurrency
Guernsey	Wheeling Township	45.12	72.61	SR 658 south	Northern terminus of SR 658
Guernsey	Liberty Township	51.74– 52.28	83.27– 84.14	I-77 – Marietta, Cleveland	Exit 54 (I-77)
1.000 mi = 1.609 km; 1.000 km = 0.621 mi: Concurrency terminus
