= McLaughlin Mound =

Archaeological site in Ohio, United States

- U.S. National Register of Historic Places
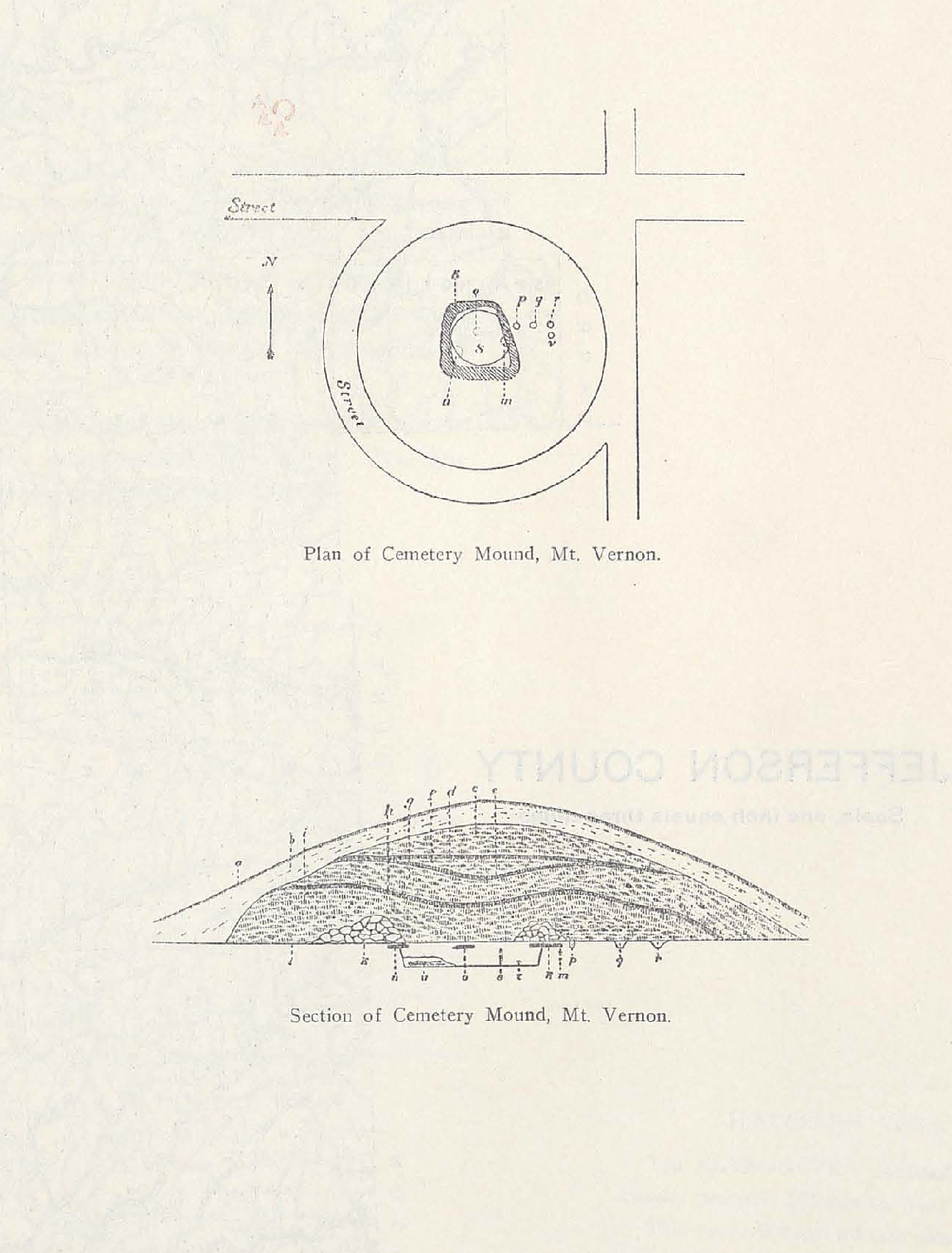
- Cemetery Mound diagrams published in 1914
- Nearest city: Mount Vernon
- Area: Less than 1 acre (0.40 ha)
- NRHP reference No.: 72001025
- Added to NRHP: December 11, 1972

The McLaughlin Mound, also called Cemetery Mound, is a Native American mound in the central part of the U.S. state of Ohio. Located in Mound View Cemetery near the city of Mount Vernon in Knox County, it is an important archaeological site.

McLaughlin measures approximately 5.5 feet (1.7 m) high and 75 feet (23 m) in diameter. Located on a hill with an elevation of 1,080 feet (330 m), it is typical of burial mounds constructed by people of the Adena culture. Although the date of work is uncertain, it is known to have been excavated at some point in the past; those digging into the mound discovered burned bones in the course of their work. Such a discovery is typical of Adena mounds: the Adena frequently placed bodies within wooden buildings that were ceremonially burned, after which they constructed mounds atop the site. As a result, it is likely that a comprehensive excavation of the mound would discover features such as postholes; excavations of similar mounds located along Alum Creek to the west revealed the remains of houses and cremated bodies.

When excavated in the late 19th century, it was found to contain an ancient skeleton with traces of fabric as well as a copper crescent at the neck, bear teeth along the left arm, and sea shells at the hips. The cone-shaped mound showed signs of being carefully constructed and was symmetrical with a circular base.

In 1972, the McLaughlin Mound was listed on the National Register of Historic Places because of its archaeological significance; it is one of three Knox County mounds on the Register, along with the Raleigh and Stackhouse Mounds near Fredericktown to the northwest. Key to its designation was its potential to reveal further information about its builders, as post-excavation analysis of any artifacts found within the mound might give archaeologists a substantially clearer understanding of the population movements and cultural developments of the Adena people in central Ohio.
