= Ohio State Route 297 =

State highway in Stark County, Ohio, US

State Route 297
- Raff Road SW

Route information
- Maintained by ODOT
- Length: 2.53 mi (4.07 km)
- Existed: early 1990s–2025

Major junctions
- South end: US 30 / US 62 near Canton
- North end: SR 172 in Canton

Location
- Country: United States
- State: Ohio
- Counties: Stark

Highway system
- Ohio State Highway System; Interstate; US; State; Scenic
← SR 296	→ SR 298

State Route 297 (SR 297) was a short north–south state highway in the northeastern portion of the U.S. state of Ohio. Its southern terminus is at a long interchange with U.S. Routes 30 (US 30) and 62 in Perry and Canton township, and its signed northern terminus is at SR 172 at the intersection of Raff Avenue and Tuscarawas Street in western on the border of Perry Township and the city of Canton. SR 297 continues, unsigned, one-half mile (0.80 km) west along SR 172 to its intersection with Whipple Avenue.

== Route description ==
SR 297 begins at an interchange with the US 30 and US 62 freeway southwest of Canton in Perry Township. In this vicinity, the northbound lanes of SR 297 run alongside the south freeway as a frontage road while the southbound lanes are mirrored on the north side of it. Immediately after exiting the freeway, the highway comes to an intersection with Whipple Avenue. Just east of this intersection, SR 297 enters Canton Township and comes to an intersection with Raff Road, just outside the city limits of Canton. Ramps to and from the freeway continue east from here but SR 297 turns north onto the three-to-four-lane Raff Road. After an intersection with Southway Street (partly the former routing of US 62), the road has a grade crossing with a Norfolk Southern railroad and continues north-northeast through a light industrial area of Canton Township. At the intersection of 13th Street, SR 297 enters Canton as a three lane road (one travel land in each direction plus a center turn lane) and passes through a mostly residential neighborhood. Signage for SR 297 ends at its intersection with Tuscarawas Street, SR 172 but the Ohio Department of Transportation's official documents for the road show it continuing west along SR 172 for one-half mile (0.80 km). This section of Tuscarawas Street features commercial businesses on both sides of the five lane (four travel lanes and one center turn lane) before SR 297 ends at Whipple Avenue.

== History ==
SR 297 was designated around 1992 along the route it followed until 2025 in and around Canton. It replaced SR 791, a road that was created in 1946 running from US 62 at Southway Street to US 30 then following Tuscarawas Street, later extending to the freeway interchange when it was completed. SR 791 would be shown on official state maps until 1977 but would remain in Stark County traffic logs until 1988. Some online mapping services such as Bing Maps show the old route number along Raff Road.

An earlier SR 297 was absorbed into SR 281 by 1939.

In 2025, ODOT proposed eliminating State Route 297 and turning Raff Avenue over to Stark County maintenance. ODOT would continue to maintain the ramps at the US 30/US 62 interchange that were previously designated as part of SR 297. The plan was approved, with SR 297 signage being removed by January 2026.

== Major intersections ==
The entire route is in Stark County.

Location	mi	km	Destinations	Notes
Perry–Canton township line	0.00– 0.75	0.00– 1.21	US 30 / US 62 – Canton, Massillon	Interchange
Canton	2.03	3.27	SR 172 east (Tuscarawas Street) / Raff Road	Southern end of SR 172 concurrency
Canton	2.53	4.07	SR 172 west (Tuscarawas Street) / Whipple Avenue	Northern end of SR 172 concurrency
1.000 mi = 1.609 km; 1.000 km = 0.621 mi: Concurrency terminus
