= Ohio State Route 814 =

State highway in Champaign County, Ohio, US

State Route 814

Route information
- Maintained by ODOT
- Length: 3.07 mi (4.94 km)
- Existed: 1982–present

Major junctions
- South end: US 36 near Urbana
- North end: SR 296 near Urbana

Location
- Country: United States
- State: Ohio
- Counties: Champaign

Highway system
- Ohio State Highway System; Interstate; US; State; Scenic
← SR 807	→ SR 821

State Route 814 (SR 814) is a 3-mile (5 km), north–south state route in western Ohio. The entirety of SR 814 lies within Champaign County. The southern terminus of SR 814 is at U.S. Route 36 (US 36) approximately three miles (4.8 km) east of Urbana, and its northern terminus is at SR 296 about five and a half miles (8.9 km) northeast of Urbana. The SR 814 designation came about during the early 1980s, being re-numbered from State Route 714 following a major issue with SR 714 shields continually disappearing.

== Route description ==
SR 814 commences at the intersection of US 36 and Ludlow Road east of Urbana in Union Township, just a short distance west of Urbana Country Club. The highway trends northwesterly for its entire length through farm country, passing by a few homes along the way. SR 814 intersects Swisher Road, then ducks briefly through Wayne Township, where it meets Stone Quarry Road. Soon after entering Salem Township, SR 814 arrives at its endpoint at SR 296 northeast of Urbana.

== History ==

SR 814 was originally designated as SR 714 c. 1937. In the early 1970s, signage for SR 714 began to disappear. It was discovered that because the number 714 was also a slang term for Quaaludes, a prescription drug often used recreationally, young persons were stealing the highway signs. For this reason, SR 714 was renumbered to SR 814 in 1982.

Browse numbered routes
← SR 711	OH	→ SR 715

== Major intersections ==
The entire route is in Champaign County.

Location	mi	km	Destinations	Notes
Union Township	0.00	0.00	US 36 / South Ludlow Road	
Salem Township	3.07	4.94	SR 296	
1.000 mi = 1.609 km; 1.000 km = 0.621 mi
