= Fredericktown Presbyterian Church =

Historic church in Ohio, United States

- U.S. National Register of Historic Places
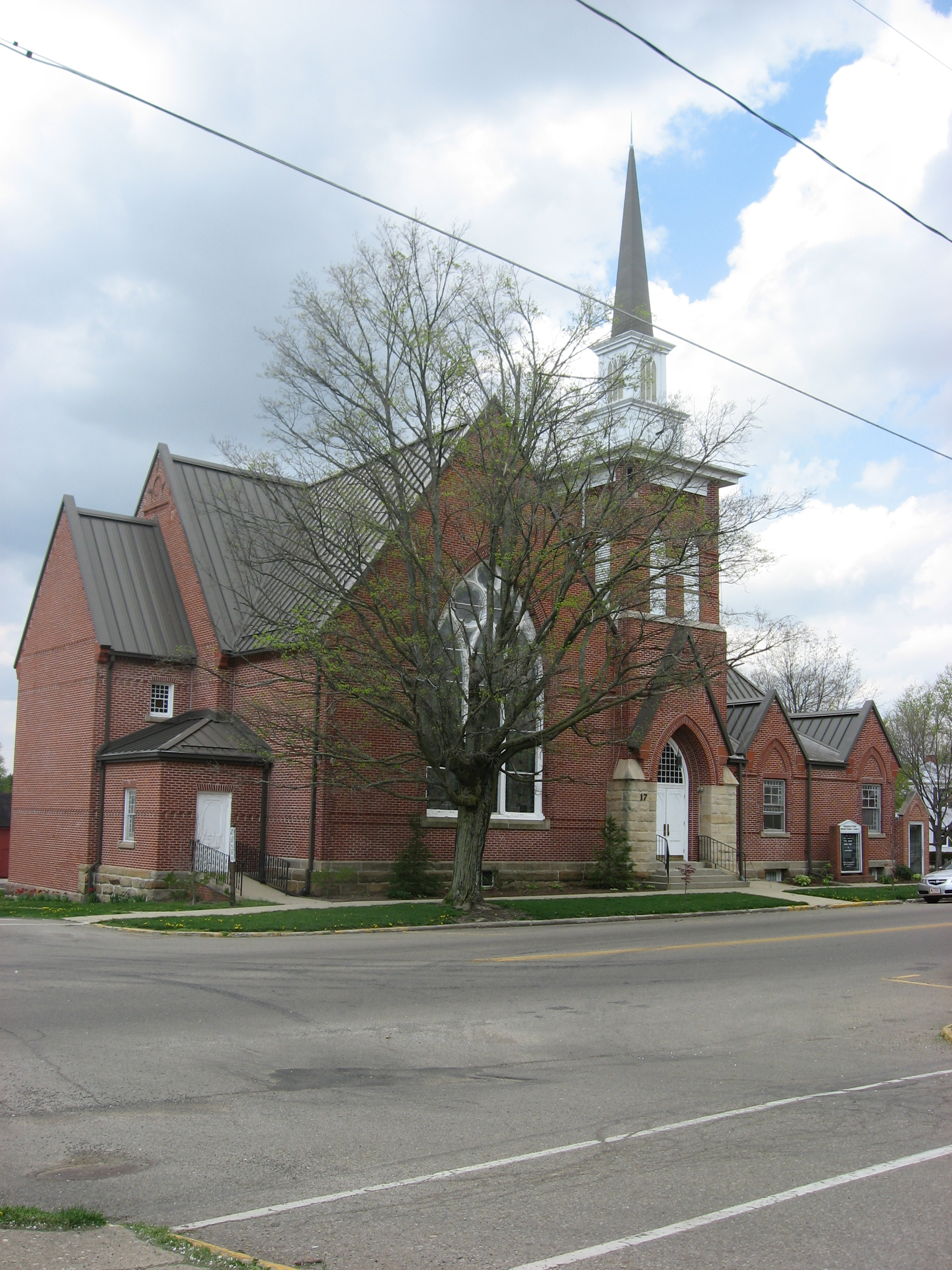

- Location within Ohio Location within the United States
- Location: Main St. and Public Sq., Fredericktown, Ohio
- Coordinates: 40°28′50″N 82°32′37″W
- Area: less than one acre
- Built: 1885
- Architect: Bolton, G.W.; Evans & Sons
- Architectural style: Gothic
- MPS: Fredericktown MRA
- NRHP reference No.: 79003864
- Added to NRHP: November 6, 1979

Fredericktown Presbyterian Church is a historic church located on South Main Street and West 4th Street in Fredericktown, Ohio.

It was built in 1885 and added to the National Register in 1979.
