= Ohio State Route 715 =

State highway in central Ohio, US

State Route 715

Route information
- Maintained by O.D.O.T.
- Length: 12.40 mi (19.96 km)
- Existed: 1939–present

Major junctions
- West end: US 36 near Howard
- East end: US 36 in Nellie

Location
- Country: United States
- State: Ohio
- Counties: Knox, Coshocton

Highway system
- Ohio State Highway System; Interstate; US; State; Scenic
← SR 714	→ SR 716

State Route 715 (SR 715) is an east–west state highway in the central portion of the U.S. state of Ohio. Both of its termini are at US 36, with its western endpoint approximately 4.50 miles (7.24 km) southeast of Danville, and its eastern end on the eastern village limits of Nellie. Near its eastern terminus, SR 715 crosses over the top of the Mohawk Dam.

== Route description ==
SR 715 travels through eastern Knox County and western Coshocton County. There is no portion of SR 715 that is included within the National Highway System.

== History ==
The highway was first designated in 1939. When it was first designated, SR 715 was routed along the current path of US 36 between the two current endpoints of SR 715. During this time, US 36 was routed along the current path of SR 715. In 1962, US 36 and SR 715 swapped alignments, such that US 36 now followed the southern alignment, and SR 715 the northern alignment between the two junctions, as each does to this day. Since then, SR 715 has not experienced any changes of major significance to its routing.

== Major intersections ==
County	Location	mi	km	Destinations	Notes
Knox	Union Township	0.00	0.00	US 36 (Coshocton Road)	
Coshocton	Newcastle Township	6.80	10.94	SR 206 north	Western end of SR 206 concurrency
Coshocton	Newcastle Township	7.45	11.99	SR 206 south	Eastern end of SR 206 concurrency
Coshocton	Nellie	12.40	19.96	US 36	
1.000 mi = 1.609 km; 1.000 km = 0.621 mi: Concurrency terminus
