= Knox County Infirmary =

- U.S. National Register of Historic Places
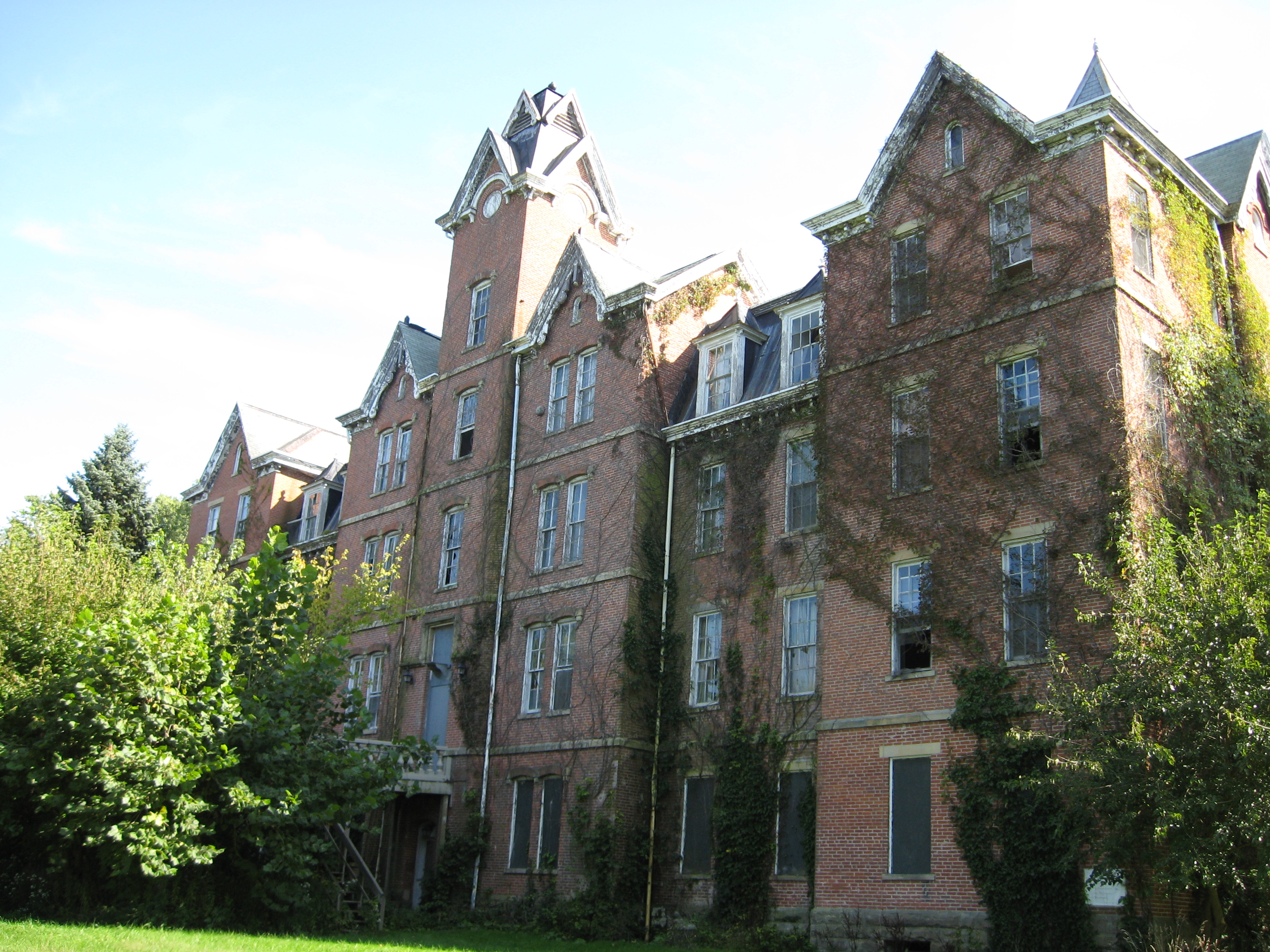

- Location within Ohio Location within the United States
- Nearest city: Mt. Vernon, Ohio
- Coordinates: 40°20′51″N 82°33′02″W
- Area: 0.0 acres (0 ha)
- Built: 1877
- Architect: William Tinsley
- NRHP reference No.: 86001567
- Added to NRHP: July 10, 1986

The Knox County Infirmary was a former Infirmary and poorhouse in Knox County, Ohio for those with mental disorders, the poor, and children. It was listed on the National Register of Historic Places in 1986.

In June 1842, the county acquired 132 acres of land from William Davidson along the Cleveland, Mt. Vernon & Columbus Railroad and expanded upon the existing structures for the first county infirmary and poorhouse. A larger structure was soon needed and Tinsley & Company of Columbus was hired to furnish plans for a new building. A contract for construction was awarded to the J. Henegan & Company on September 30, 1874 and the new Italianate-styled infirmary was opened in September 1877. It featured 100 rooms and a central 65-foot-high tower that contained three water tanks.

Substandard conditions forced the Knox County Infirmary to close in 1957. The building was purchased by Foursquare Gospel Church and was used as the Mt. Vernon Bible College until 1988, when it relocated to Virginia.

The building, abandoned for several years, was reopened as The House of Nightmares in 1997. It became one of the state's largest haunted houses and was in use until January 2006 when four floors of the building collapsed.

Toby Spade purchased the former infirmary from the state of Ohio with the intent of rehabilitating the building but the front north facade gave way in February 2015. A fire consumed the entire structure on June 26.
