= Ohio State Route 308 =

State highway in Knox County, Ohio, US

State Route 308

Route information
- Maintained by ODOT
- Length: 3.00 mi (4.83 km)

Major junctions
- South end: SR 229 in Gambier
- North end: US 36 near Mount Vernon

Location
- Country: United States
- State: Ohio
- Counties: Knox

Highway system
- Ohio State Highway System; Interstate; US; State; Scenic
← SR 307	→ SR 309

State Route 308 (SR 308) is a north–south state highway in the central portion of Ohio, a U.S. state. The southern terminus of SR 308 is at SR 229 in the western end of the village of Gambier, and its northern terminus is three miles (4.8 km) to the north of that point at a T-intersection with U.S. Route 36 (US 36) that is located approximately one and a half miles (2.4 km) east of the city limits of Mount Vernon.

== Route description ==
SR 308 runs exclusively in the central portion of Knox County. The route is not a part of the National Highway System.

== History ==
When first designated in 1932, SR 308 was a spur route connecting US 36 with the village of Gambier and Kenyon College. It would be 1939 before SR 308 would become a connector route, when SR 229 was extended east of Mount Vernon, and in the process connected with SR 308 at its southern terminus.

== Major intersections ==
The entire route is in Knox County.

Location	mi	km	Destinations	Notes
Gambier	0.00	0.00	SR 229 (East Gambier Street) to Laymon Road / US 62 – Mount Vernon	
Monroe Township	3.00	4.83	US 36 (Coshocton Road) – Mount Vernon, Coshocton	
1.000 mi = 1.609 km; 1.000 km = 0.621 mi
