= Salt Fork State Park =

State park in Ohio, United States

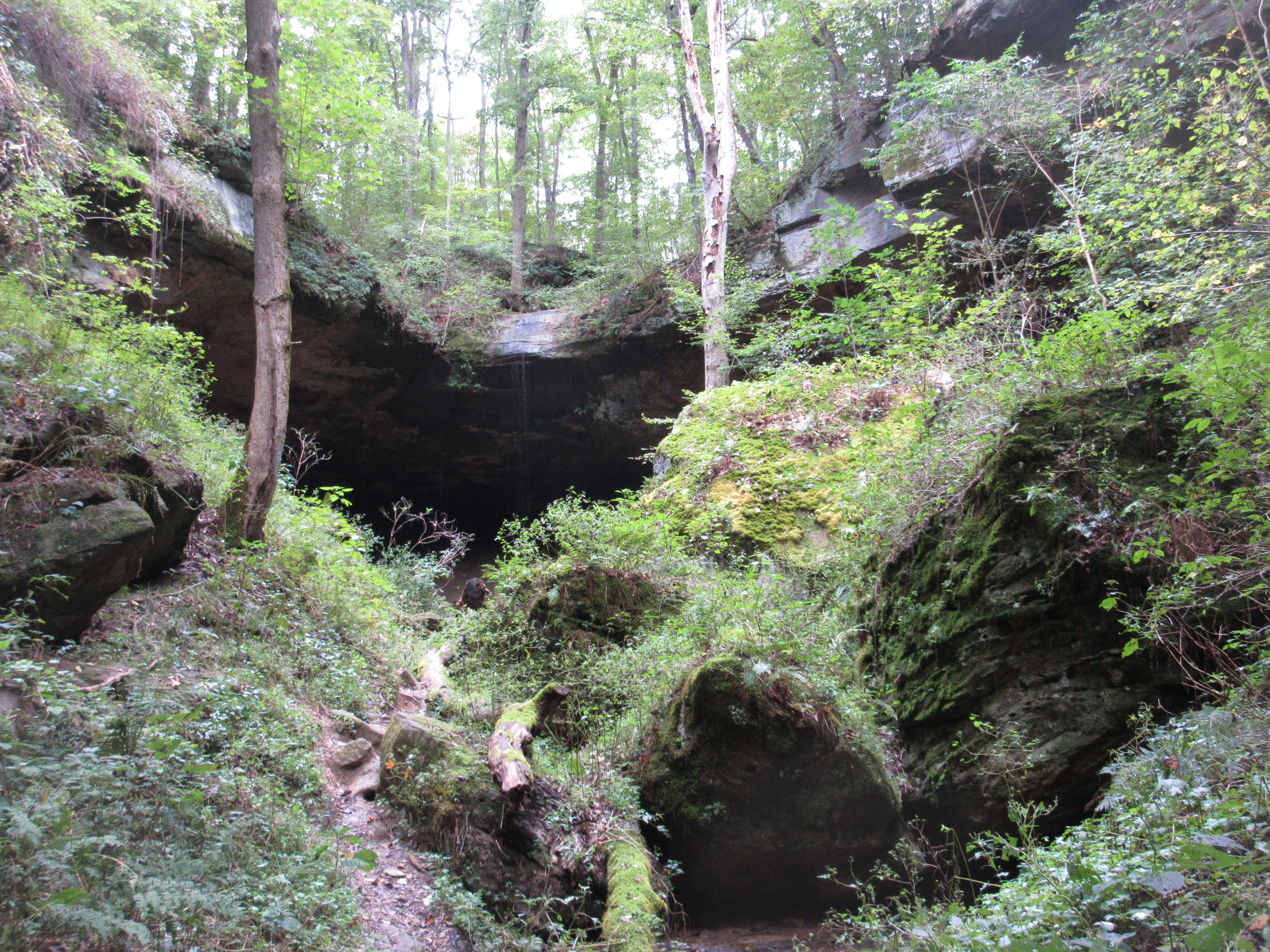
- Hosack's Cave, a popular hiking destination in the park

- Location within Ohio Location within the United States
- Location: Guernsey County, Ohio, United States
- Coordinates: 40°06′09″N 81°31′44″W
- Area: 17,229 acres (6,972 ha) land; 2,952 acres (1,195 ha) water
- Elevation: 797 ft (243 m)
- Established: 1960
- Administrator: Ohio Department of Natural Resources
- Designation: Ohio state park
- Website: Official website

Salt Fork State Park is a public recreation area located six miles (9.7 km) north of Lore City in Guernsey County, Ohio. It is the largest state park in Ohio, encompassing 17,229 acres (6,972 ha) of land and 2,952 acres (1,195 ha) of water. The grounds include the Kennedy Stone House, which is listed on the National Register of Historic Places. The park is managed by the Ohio Department of Natural Resources Division of Parks and Watercraft.

== History ==
Salt Fork was named for a mineral lick along the creek's course. Plans to dam the creek for use as a water source began in 1956, then switched to planning for use as a recreational area in 1960. An earthen dam was completed in 1967, with the construction of recreational facilities initiated in 1968. Salt Fork Lodge opened in 1972.

== Activities and amenities ==
The park features an 18-hole golf course, 2,500-foot swimming beach, two marinas and seven boat launching ramps, fishing for largemouth bass, crappie, bluegill, walleye and muskellunge, hunting, picnicking facilities, trails for hiking, snowmobiling, and equestrian use, miniature golf, nature center, and an archery range.
