= Antiquity, Ohio =

Unincorporated community in Ohio, U.S.

Coordinates: 38°56′49″N 81°54′22″W

Location of Antiquity within the state of Ohio.

Antiquity is an unincorporated community in Meigs County, in the U.S. state of Ohio.

== History ==
A post office called Antiquity was established in 1878, and remained in operation until 1942. The community was named for the fact that settlers found carvings on rocks near the town site.
