= Raleigh Mound =

Archaeological site in Ohio, United States

- U.S. National Register of Historic Places
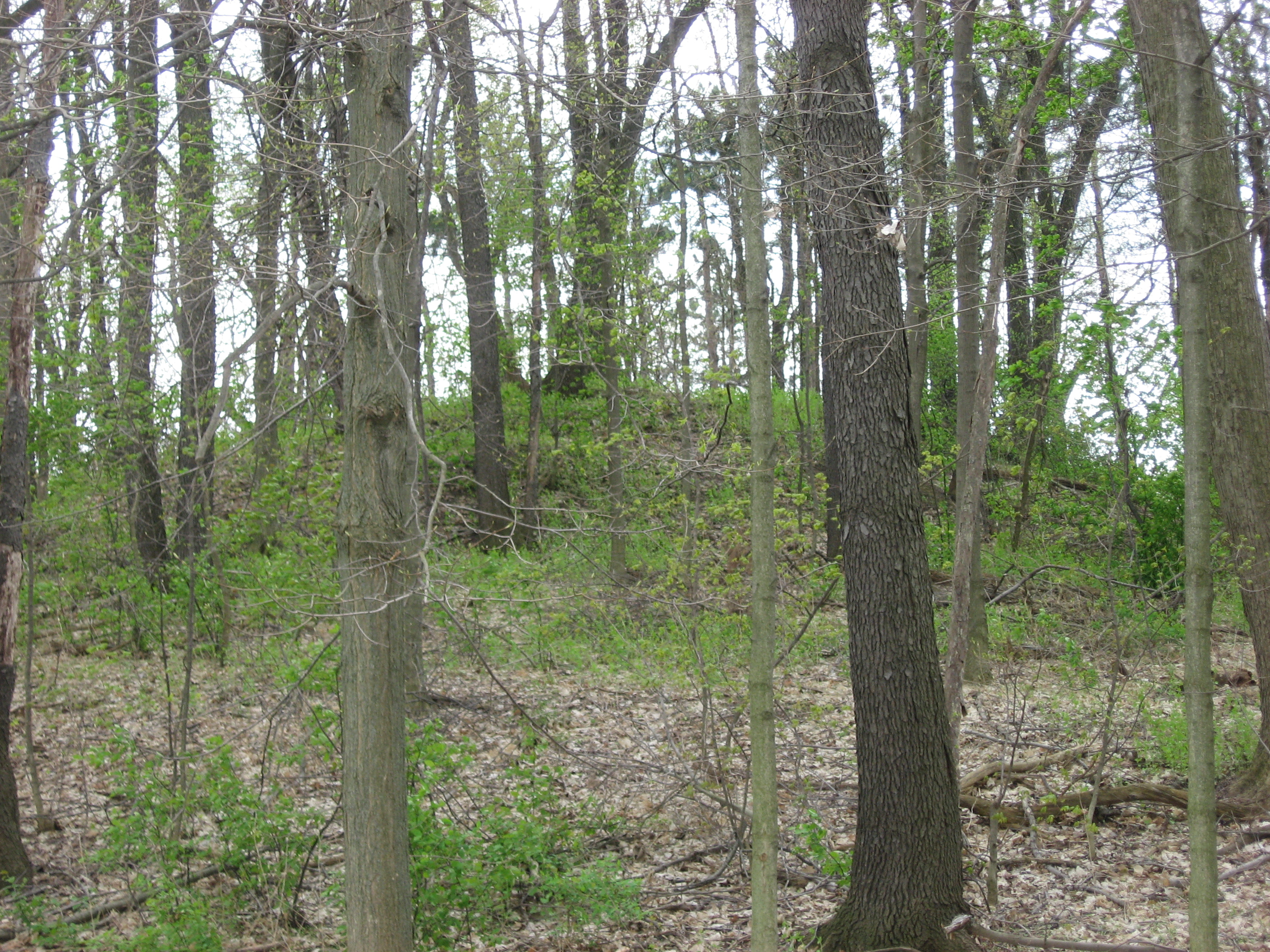
- Streetside view

- Location within Ohio Location within the United States
- Location: Mound St., Fredericktown, Ohio
- Coordinates: 40°28′25″N 82°32′35″W
- Area: Less than 1 acre (0.40 ha)
- NRHP reference No.: 75001445
- Added to NRHP: October 14, 1975

The Raleigh Mound (33KN32) is a Native American mound in the village of Fredericktown, Ohio, United States. Built thousands of years ago, the mound is an important archaeological site.

The site's original name was "Rowley Mound", given in honor of a Mr. Rowley, the property owner. Both spellings have been used by federal sources; different editions of United States Geological Survey maps use both spellings, the United States Board on Geographic Names officially determined to spell it "Rowley" in 1963, and the National Park Service lists it as "Raleigh" while noting "Rowley" as a variant.

Raleigh measures approximately 20 feet (6.1 m) tall with a diameter of uncertain size, ranging between 80 feet (24 m) and 90 feet (27 m). Its precise size cannot be determined: the mound was built atop a small hill, and thousands of years of erosion have molded the two into a single shape. The mound was excavated at an uncertain time in the past, and the excavators recovered a distinctive artifact of a type of gorget known as an "expanded-center bar". Such a gorget is distinctive of sites affiliated with the mound-building Adena culture, which was responsible for heavy activity in the vicinity of modern Fredericktown — another Adena site, the Stackhouse Mound and Works, sits to the northeast less than 1 mile (1.6 km) away.

In 1975, the Raleigh Mound was listed on the National Register of Historic Places, qualifying because of its archaeological importance. Significant to this designation was its relationship to the Stackhouse site, as the nearby placement of the latter's larger earthworks and village site meant that a detailed investigation of the mound would have a chance of providing archaeologists with an unusually detailed understanding of the people who built it.
