= Tunnel Hill, Ohio =

Unincorporated community in Ohio, U.S.

Coordinates: 40°15′17″N 82°02′56″W

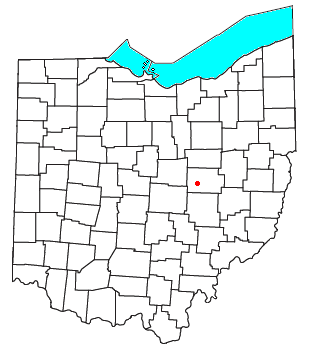
Location of Tunnel Hill, Ohio

Tunnel Hill is an unincorporated community in central Bedford Township, Coshocton County, Ohio, United States. It lies in the valley of the Little Wakatomika Creek a few miles south of Warsaw, along State Route 60 at its intersection with State Route 541.

== History ==
Tunnel Hill had its start around 1873 when a railroad tunnel was completed near the site. A post office was established at Tunnel Hill in 1873, and remained in operation until it was discontinued in 1955.
