= Ohio State Route 296 =

State highway in Champaign County, Ohio, US

State Route 296

Route information
- Maintained by ODOT
- Length: 10.54 mi (16.96 km)
- Existed: 1962–present

Major junctions
- West end: SR 29 in Salem Township
- US 68 in Salem Township
- East end: SR 245 in Wayne Township

Location
- Country: United States
- State: Ohio
- Counties: Champaign

Highway system
- Ohio State Highway System; Interstate; US; State; Scenic
← SR 295	→ SR 297

State Route 296 (SR 296) is a 10.54-mile (16.96 km) long state highway entirely in Champaign County, Ohio. Routed around the northern side of Urbana, the route runs in two townships, Salem Township and Wayne Township.

== Route description ==
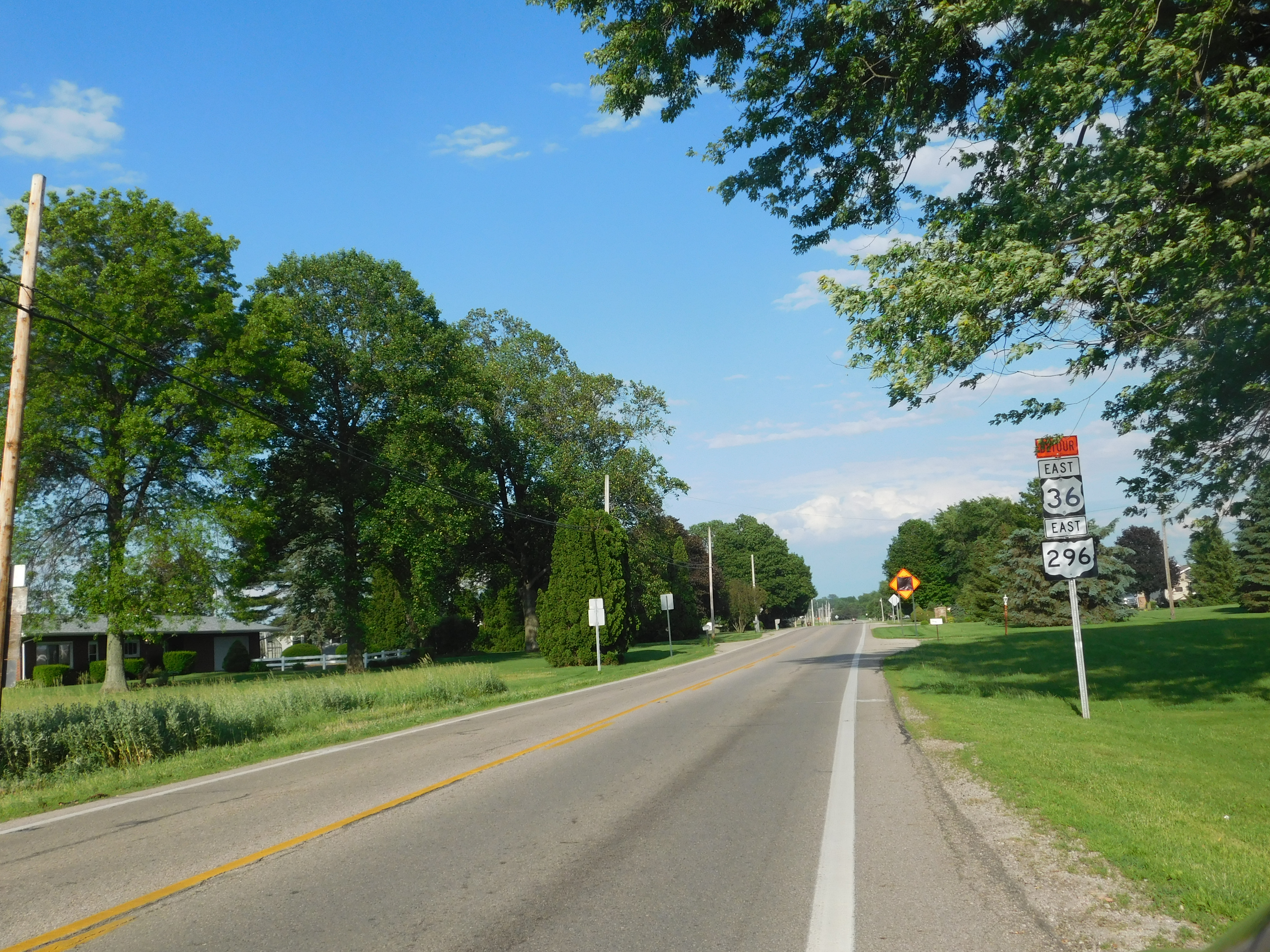
SR 296 in Salem Township from US 68

SR 296 begins at an unsignalized T-intersection with SR 29 in southern Salem Township in central Champaign County. The route initially travels northeast but curves south-southeast soon after it begins. The route crosses a railroad at-grade and then reaches US 68 at a four-way intersection. After the US 68 junction, the road continues further east before reaching a skewed T-intersection at Ludlow Road. Here, SR 296 turns left onto Ludlow Road while the short SR 814 begins to the right. SR 296 remains on Ludlow Road for a short time; it almost immediately turns right onto Urbana Woodstock Pike; soon after this intersection, it makes one last turn left to the north. Before this point, the road stayed on level ground but here, the road begins to ascend small hills. Traveling in a northeasterly direction through Wayne Township, SR 296 reaches its eastern terminus at SR 245 in the community of Middletown.

Throughout its entire length, the route travels through a mixture of single-family residential homes, forest areas, and farmland. No part of SR 296 is included within the National Highway System.

== History ==
The first section of modern-day SR 296 included as a part of the state highway system was designated SR 275 between 1931 and 1932. This route only ran from US 68 to Middletown at what was then the eastern terminus of SR 290; SR 275 continued east to Marysville. By 1933, SR 275 and SR 290 swapped routes west of Middletown. SR 290 was extended west to SR 29 by 1937. Between 1962 and June 1963, because of the Interstate Highway System, many routes in Ohio were renumbered. Due to the proposed Interstate 290 in Cleveland, SR 290 was renumbered SR 296. SR 275 at the eastern terminus was renumbered to SR 245 for a similar reason. No major changes have occurred to the route since then.

== Major intersections ==
The entire route is in Champaign County.

Location	mi	km	Destinations	Notes
Salem Township	0.00	0.00	SR 29	
Salem Township	2.33	3.75	US 68	
Salem Township	5.74	9.24	SR 814 south (Ludlow Road)	Northern terminus of SR 814
Wayne Township	10.54	16.96	SR 245 / Middletown Road	
1.000 mi = 1.609 km; 1.000 km = 0.621 mi
