= Birmingham, Guernsey County, Ohio =

Unincorporated community in Ohio, U.S.

Coordinates: 40°10′31″N 81°26′14″W

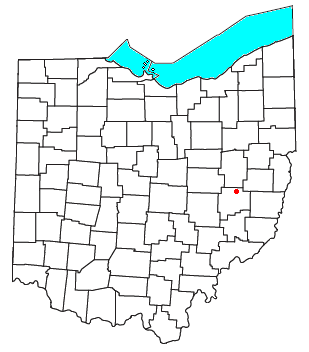
Location of Birmingham in Guernsey County, Ohio

Birmingham is an unincorporated community in southeastern Monroe Township, Guernsey County, Ohio, United States. It lies at the intersection of Beal, Birmingham, and Peoli Roads, 3 3/4 miles (6.0 km) south of Peoli, 7 miles (11¼ km) east-northeast of Kimbolton, and 13 miles (21 km) northeast of central Cambridge, the county seat of Guernsey County. Nearby streams flow southward into Salt Fork Lake, which is included in Salt Fork State Park.
