= North Salem, Ohio =

Unincorporated community in Ohio, U.S.

Coordinates: 40°08′36″N 81°32′44″W

North Salem is an unincorporated community in Guernsey County, in the U.S. state of Ohio.

== History ==
A post office was established at North Salem in 1854, and remained in operation until 1906. The name is a bit of a misnomer, as North Salem is actually south of Salem, Ohio.
