= Nellie, Ohio =

- Village
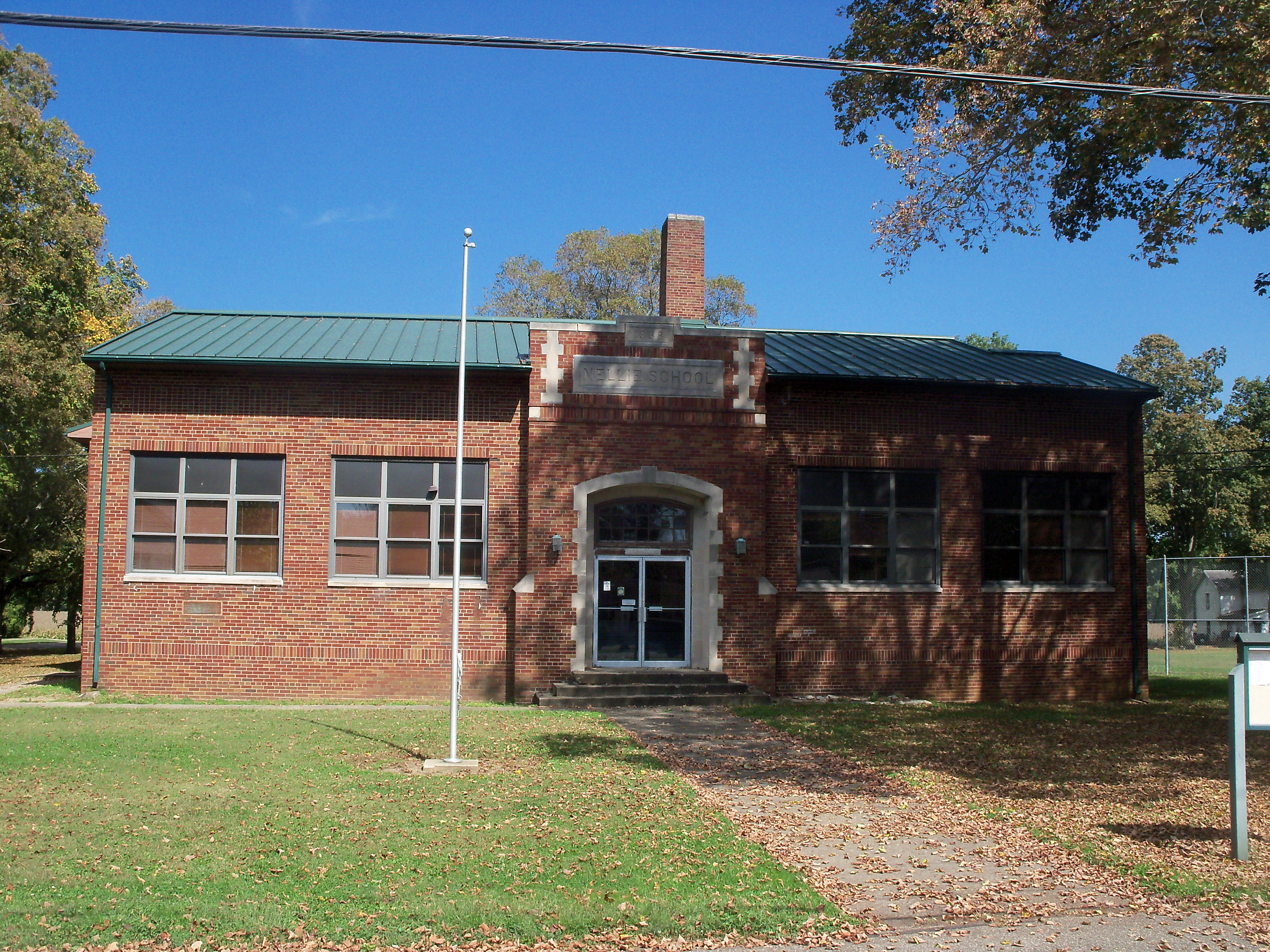
- 1938 Nellie School building

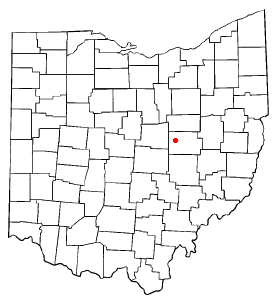
- Location of Nellie, Ohio

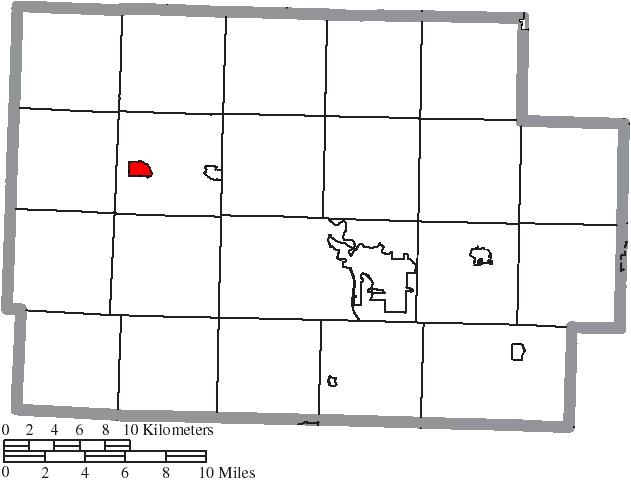
- Location of Nellie in Coshocton County
- Coordinates: 40°20′19″N 82°04′17″W
- Country: United States
- State: Ohio
- County: Coshocton
- Township: Jefferson

Area
  - Total: 0.68 sq mi (1.77 km^{2})
  - Land: 0.68 sq mi (1.77 km^{2})
  - Water: 0 sq mi (0.00 km^{2})
- Elevation: 824 ft (251 m)

Population (2020)
  - Total: 122
  - Density: 178.8/sq mi (69.04/km^{2})
- Time zone: UTC-5 (Eastern (EST))
  - Summer (DST): UTC-4 (EDT)
- FIPS code: 39-53816
- GNIS feature ID: 2399442

Nellie is a village in Coshocton County, Ohio, United States, along the Walhonding River. The population was 122 at the 2020 census.

The 1930s-era Mohawk Dam, a dry dam built for flood control, is just to the north and west of the village.

== Geography ==
According to the United States Census Bureau, the village has a total area of 0.71 square miles (1.84 km^{2}), all land.

== Demographics ==
Historical population
Census	Pop.	Note	%±
1910	133		—
1920	144		8.3%
1930	117		−18.7%
1940	121		3.4%
1950	165		36.4%
1960	145		−12.1%
1970	140		−3.4%
1980	150		7.1%
1990	130		−13.3%
2000	134		3.1%
2010	131		−2.2%
2020	122		−6.9%
U.S. Decennial Census

=== 2010 census ===
As of the census of 2010, there were 131 people, 49 households, and 34 families living in the village. The population density was 184.5 inhabitants per square mile (71.2/km^{2}). There were 56 housing units at an average density of 78.9 per square mile (30.5/km^{2}). The racial makeup of the village was 98.5% White, 0.8% from other races, and 0.8% from two or more races.

There were 49 households, of which 34.7% had children under the age of 18 living with them, 53.1% were married couples living together, 8.2% had a female householder with no husband present, 8.2% had a male householder with no wife present, and 30.6% were non-families. 28.6% of all households were made up of individuals, and 12.3% had someone living alone who was 65 years of age or older. The average household size was 2.67 and the average family size was 3.15.

The median age in the village was 37.5 years. 28.2% of residents were under the age of 18; 5.4% were between the ages of 18 and 24; 29% were from 25 to 44; 22.9% were from 45 to 64; and 14.5% were 65 years of age or older. The gender makeup of the village was 52.7% male and 47.3% female.

=== 2000 census ===
As of the census of 2000, there were 134 people, 53 households, and 40 families living in the village. The population density was 188.6 inhabitants per square mile (72.8/km^{2}). There were 104 housing units at an average density of 146.4 per square mile (56.5/km^{2}). The racial makeup of the village was 96.27% White, 0.75% African American, and 2.99% from two or more races.

There were 53 households, out of which 30.2% had children under the age of 18 living with them, 64.2% were married couples living together, 9.4% had a female householder with no husband present, and 24.5% were non-families. 20.8% of all households were made up of individuals, and 11.3% had someone living alone who was 65 years of age or older. The average household size was 2.53 and the average family size was 2.95.

In the village, the population was spread out, with 24.6% under the age of 18, 11.9% from 18 to 24, 23.1% from 25 to 44, 26.9% from 45 to 64, and 13.4% who were 65 years of age or older. The median age was 38 years. For every 100 females there were 86.1 males. For every 100 females age 18 and over, there were 94.2 males.

The median income for a household in the village was $38,750, and the median income for a family was $40,417. Males had a median income of $31,250 versus $20,833 for females. The per capita income for the village was $15,333. There were 4.3% of families and 3.0% of the population living below the poverty line, including no under eighteens and 10.5% of those over 64.
