= Fredericktown, Ohio =

- Village
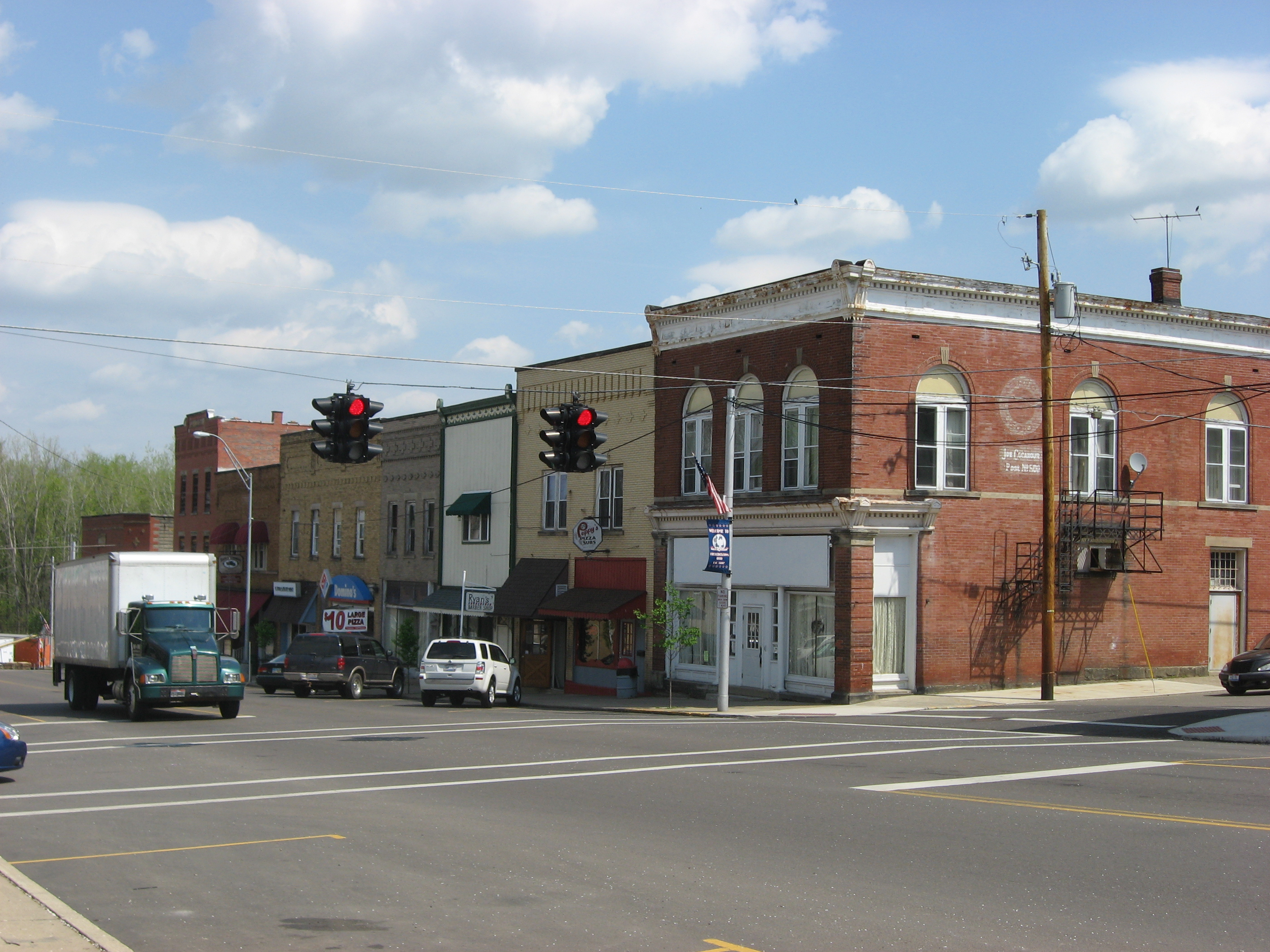
- Main Street in the business district
- Motto: "It can be done in a small town"
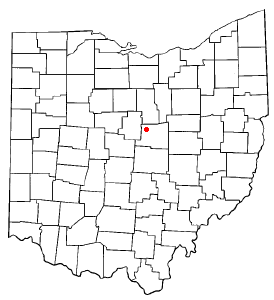
- Location of Fredericktown in Ohio

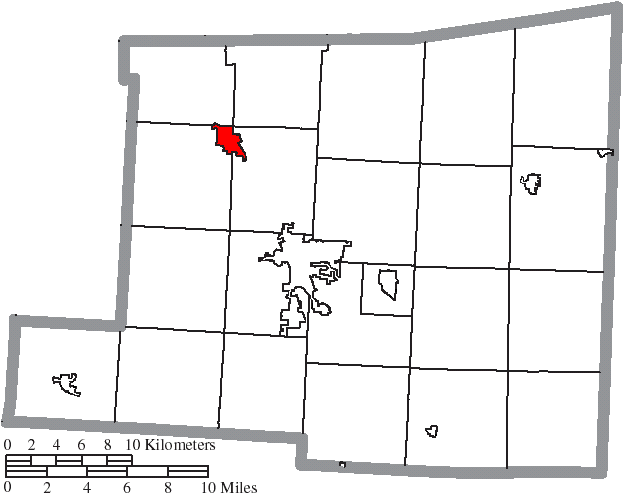
- Location of Fredericktown in Knox County
- Coordinates: 40°28′43″N 82°32′55″W
- Country: United States
- State: Ohio
- County: Knox

Area
  - Total: 2.08 sq mi (5.38 km^{2})
  - Land: 1.98 sq mi (5.14 km^{2})
  - Water: 0.093 sq mi (0.24 km^{2})
- Elevation: 1,083 ft (330 m)

Population (2020)
  - Total: 2,648
  - Estimate (2023): 2,619
  - Density: 1,334.4/sq mi (515.22/km^{2})
- Time zone: UTC-5 (EST)
  - Summer (DST): UTC-4 (EDT)
- ZIP code: 43019
- Area code: 740
- FIPS code: 39-28658
- GNIS feature ID: 1086397
- Website: http://www.fredericktownohio.net

Fredericktown is a village in Knox County, Ohio, United States. The population was 2,648 at the 2020 census.

== History ==
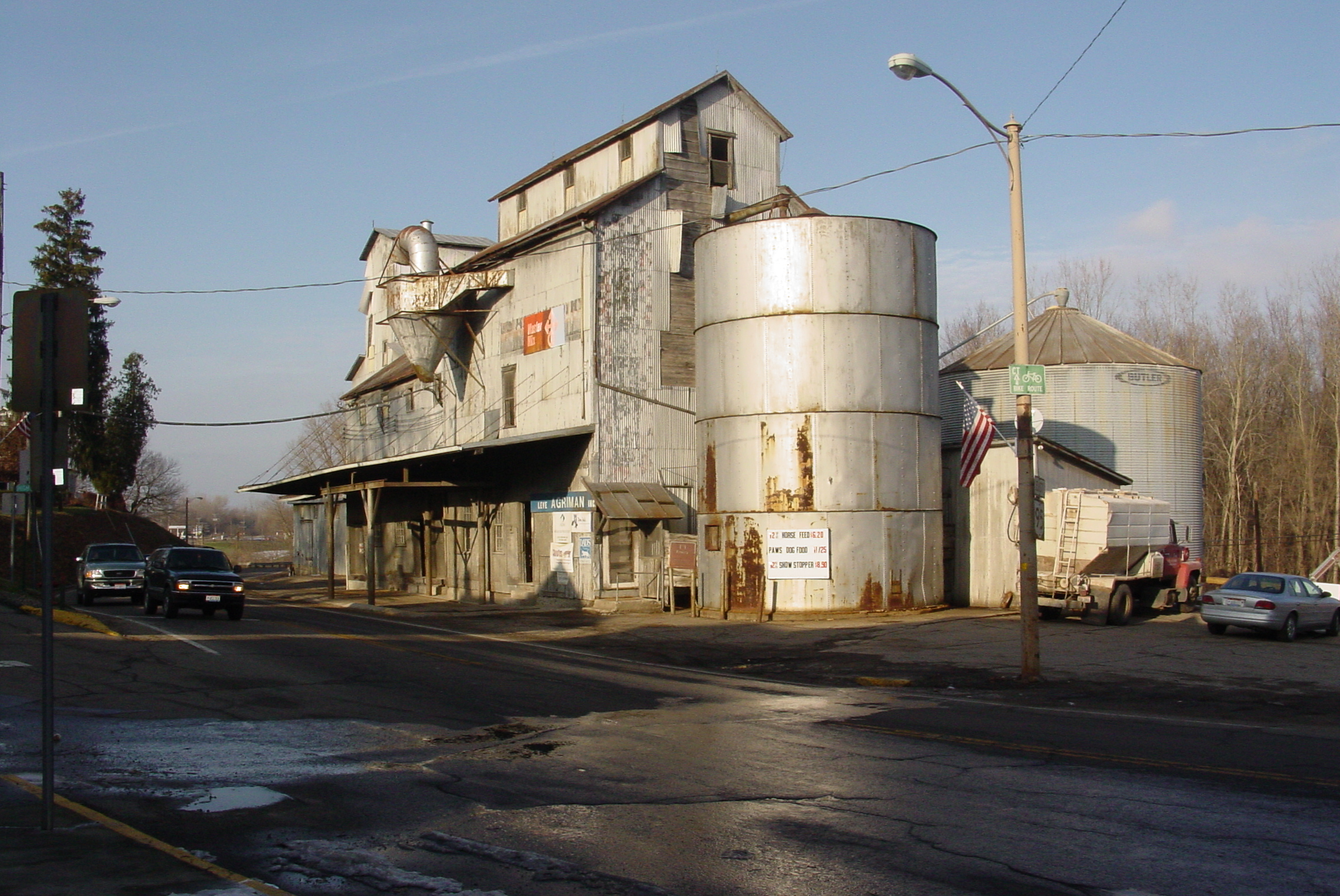
The Fredericktown Grain Elevator, site of the first mill

Fredericktown was platted in 1807, and named after Frederick, Maryland, the native home of a first settler.

== Geography ==
According to the United States Census Bureau, the village has a total area of 2.07 square miles (5.36 km^{2}), of which 1.97 square miles (5.10 km^{2}) is land and 0.10 square miles (0.26 km^{2}) is water.

== Demographics ==
Historical population
Census	Pop.	Note	%±
1830	161		—
1840	444		175.8%
1850	712		60.4%
1860	775		8.8%
1870	690		−11.0%
1880	850		23.2%
1890	847		−0.4%
1900	890		5.1%
1910	1,021		14.7%
1920	1,194		16.9%
1930	1,257		5.3%
1940	1,297		3.2%
1950	1,467		13.1%
1960	1,531		4.4%
1970	1,935		26.4%
1980	2,299		18.8%
1990	2,443		6.3%
2000	2,428		−0.6%
2010	2,493		2.7%
2020	2,648		6.2%
2023 (est.)	2,619	▼	−1.1%
U.S. Decennial Census

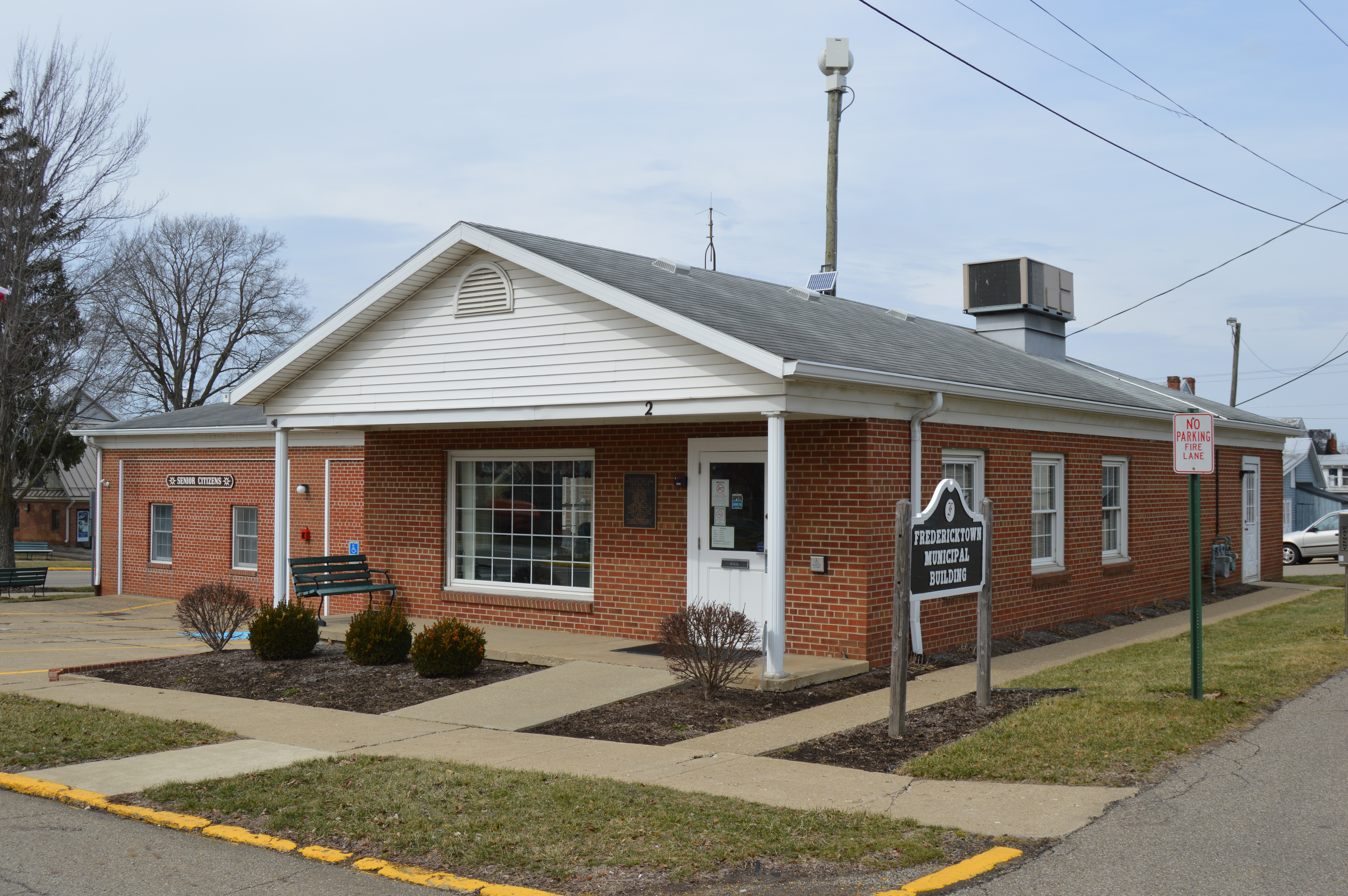
Fredericktown Municipal Building

=== 2010 census ===
As of the census of 2010, there were 2,493 people, 1,050 households, and 691 families living in the village. The population density was 1,265.5 inhabitants per square mile (488.6/km^{2}). There were 1,133 housing units at an average density of 575.1 per square mile (222.0/km^{2}). The racial makeup of the village was 98.0% White, 0.4% African American, 0.2% Native American, 0.3% from other races, and 1.0% from two or more races. Hispanic or Latino of any race were 0.9% of the population.

There were 1,050 households, of which 33.8% had children under the age of 18 living with them, 48.0% were married couples living together, 12.8% had a female householder with no husband present, 5.0% had a male householder with no wife present, and 34.2% were non-families. 29.4% of all households were made up of individuals, and 12.7% had someone living alone who was 65 years of age or older. The average household size was 2.37 and the average family size was 2.91.

The median age in the village was 37.6 years. 25.8% of residents were under the age of 18; 7.3% were between the ages of 18 and 24; 26.9% were from 25 to 44; 24.6% were from 45 to 64; and 15.4% were 65 years of age or older. The gender makeup of the village was 48.7% male and 51.3% female.

=== 2000 census ===
As of the census of 2000, there were 2,428 people, 1,021 households, and 681 families living in the village. The population density was 1,719.3 inhabitants per square mile (663.8/km^{2}). There were 1,103 housing units at an average density of 781.1 per square mile (301.6/km^{2}). The racial makeup of the village was 98.64% White, 0.29% African American, 0.08% Native American, 0.08% Asian, 0.12% from other races, and 0.78% from two or more races. Hispanic or Latino of any race were 0.41% of the population.

There were 1,021 households, out of which 32.7% had children under the age of 18 living with them, 52.3% were married couples living together, 9.8% had a female householder with no husband present, and 33.3% were non-families. 30.0% of all households were made up of individuals, and 14.0% had someone living alone who was 65 years of age or older. The average household size was 2.38 and the average family size was 2.94.

In the village, the population was spread out, with 25.7% under the age of 18, 9.6% from 18 to 24, 28.8% from 25 to 44, 22.0% from 45 to 64, and 14.0% who were 65 years of age or older. The median age was 36 years. For every 100 females there were 94.1 males. For every 100 females age 18 and over, there were 87.6 males.

The median income for a household in the village was $36,354, and the median income for a family was $45,345. Males had a median income of $34,028 versus $21,858 for females. The per capita income for the village was $19,138. About 5.7% of families and 7.1% of the population were below the poverty line, including 9.2% of those under age 18 and 9.2% of those age 65 or over.

== Transportation ==
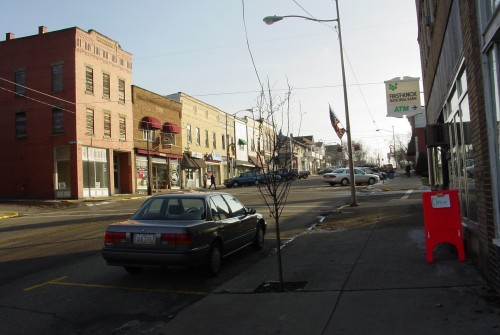
Looking South on Main St

Fredericktown is at the junction of State Routes 13 and 95, which travel north–south and east–west respectively.

== Education ==
Fredericktown Local Schools operates one elementary school, one middle school, and Fredericktown High School.

Fredericktown has a public library, a branch of The Public Library of Mount Vernon & Knox County.

== Notable people ==
- Webb C. Ball, jeweler, watchmaker, founder of BALL Watch Company
- Ollie Cline, college and professional football fullback
- Clarence Dill, served two terms in each house of Congress
- Georgia O'Ramey, Broadway actress and vaudevillian
- Luke Perry, actor
