= Martinsburg, Ohio =

- Village
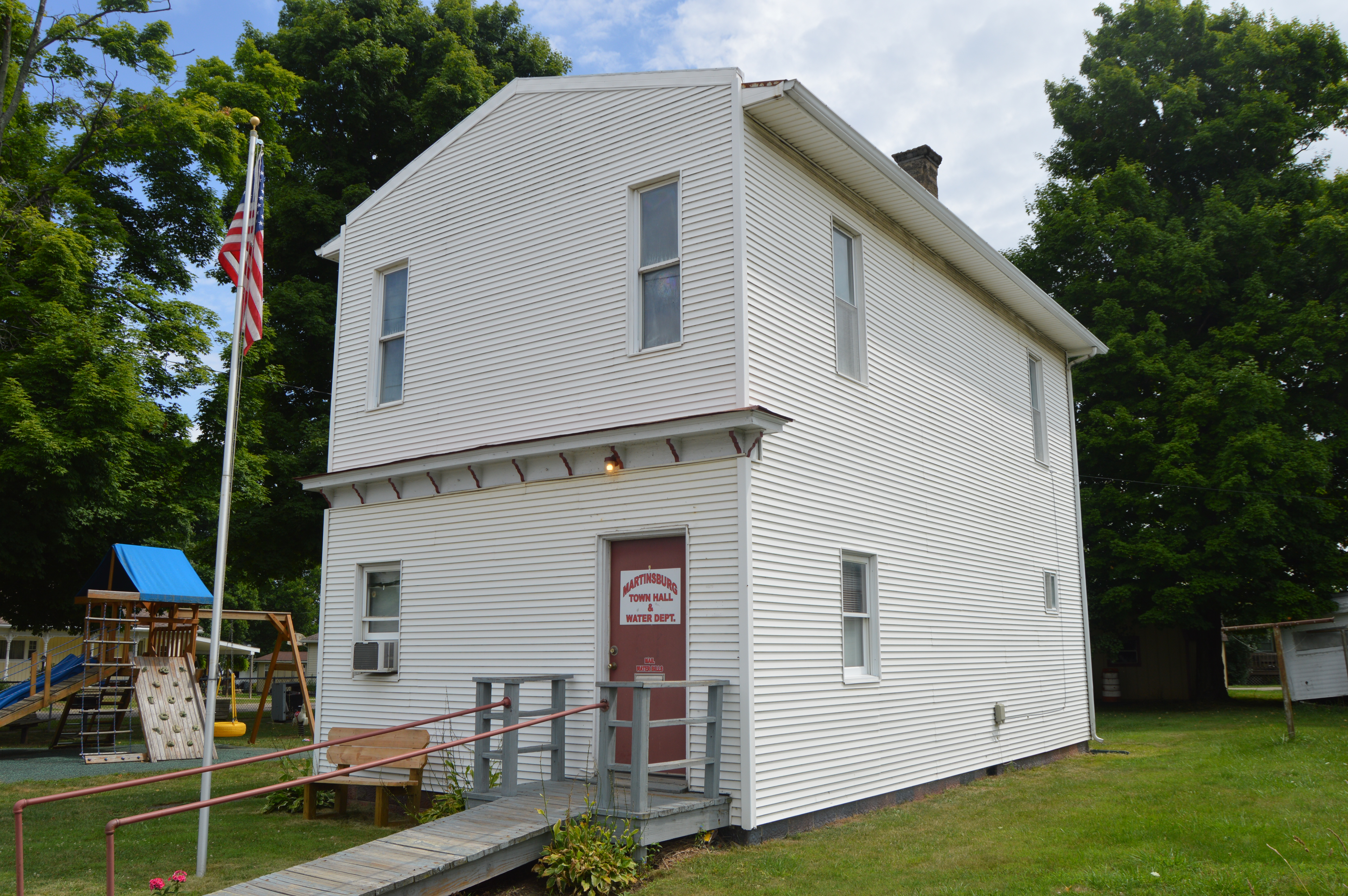
- Village Hall on Market Street

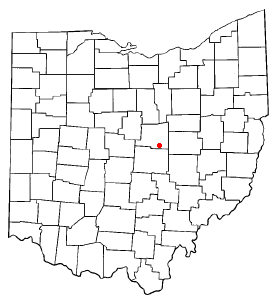
- Location of Martinsburg, Ohio

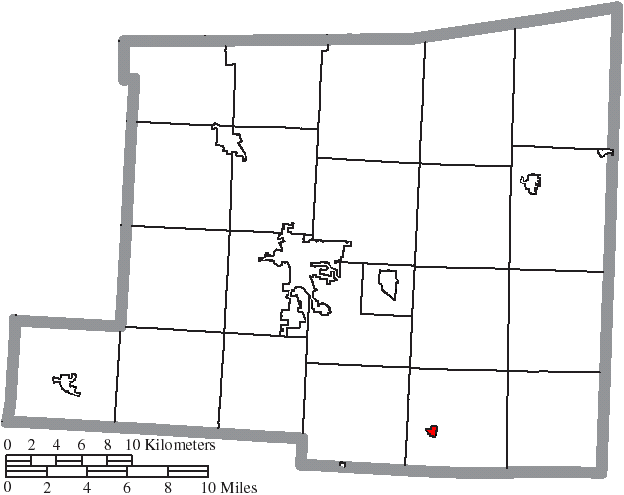
- Location of Martinsburg in Knox County
- Coordinates: 40°16′11″N 82°21′16″W
- Country: United States
- State: Ohio
- County: Knox
- Township: Clay

Area
  - Total: 0.18 sq mi (0.46 km^{2})
  - Land: 0.18 sq mi (0.46 km^{2})
  - Water: 0 sq mi (0.00 km^{2})
- Elevation: 1,175 ft (358 m)

Population (2020)
  - Total: 222
  - Density: 1,256.9/sq mi (485.29/km^{2})
- Time zone: UTC-5 (Eastern (EST))
  - Summer (DST): UTC-4 (EDT)
- ZIP code: 43037
- Area code: 740
- FIPS code: 39-48090
- GNIS feature ID: 2399265

Martinsburg is a village in Knox County, Ohio, United States. The population was 222 at the 2020 census.

== History ==
Martinsburg was founded in 1828 when the nearby rival towns of Hanover and Williamsburg merged.

== Geography ==
According to the United States Census Bureau, the village has a total area of 0.18 square miles (0.47 km^{2}), all land.

== Demographics ==
Historical population
Census	Pop.	Note	%±
1880	199		—
1890	257		29.1%
1900	238		−7.4%
1910	252		5.9%
1920	218		−13.5%
1930	189		−13.3%
1940	215		13.8%
1950	264		22.8%
1960	228		−13.6%
1970	234		2.6%
1980	240		2.6%
1990	213		−11.2%
2000	185		−13.1%
2010	237		28.1%
2020	222		−6.3%
U.S. Decennial Census

=== 2010 census ===
As of the census of 2010, there were 237 people, 97 households, and 62 families living in the village. The population density was 1,316.7 inhabitants per square mile (508.4/km^{2}). There were 110 housing units at an average density of 611.1 per square mile (235.9/km^{2}). The racial makeup of the village was 93.7% White, 1.7% African American, 1.3% Native American, 0.4% Asian, 0.4% from other races, and 2.5% from two or more races.

There were 97 households, of which 37.1% had children under the age of 18 living with them, 45.4% were married couples living together, 12.4% had a female householder with no husband present, 6.2% had a male householder with no wife present, and 36.1% were non-families. 33.0% of all households were made up of individuals, and 16.5% had someone living alone who was 65 years of age or older. The average household size was 2.44 and the average family size was 3.10.

The median age in the village was 37.6 years. 27.8% of residents were under the age of 18; 9% were between the ages of 18 and 24; 23.8% were from 25 to 44; 24.5% were from 45 to 64; and 15.2% were 65 years of age or older. The gender makeup of the village was 51.9% male and 48.1% female.

=== 2000 census ===
As of the census of 2000, there were 185 people, 76 households, and 56 families living in the village. The population density was 1,026.2 inhabitants per square mile (396.2/km^{2}). There were 81 housing units at an average density of 449.3 per square mile (173.5/km^{2}). The racial makeup of the village was 100.00% White.

There were 76 households, out of which 30.3% had children under the age of 18 living with them, 52.6% were married couples living together, 10.5% had a female householder with no husband present, and 26.3% were non-families. 23.7% of all households were made up of individuals, and 10.5% had someone living alone who was 65 years of age or older. The average household size was 2.43 and the average family size was 2.86.

In the village, the population was spread out, with 25.9% under the age of 18, 8.6% from 18 to 24, 24.3% from 25 to 44, 24.3% from 45 to 64, and 16.8% who were 65 years of age or older. The median age was 38 years. For every 100 females there were 88.8 males. For every 100 females age 18 and over, there were 87.7 males.

The median income for a household in the village was $35,625, and the median income for a family was $34,750. Males had a median income of $30,833 versus $20,250 for females. The per capita income for the village was $13,375. About 21.6% of families and 14.0% of the population were below the poverty line, including 10.3% of those under the age of eighteen and 28.6% of those 65 or over.
