= Ohio State Route 511 =

State highway in northern Ohio, US

State Route 511

Route information
- Maintained by ODOT
- Length: 50.27 mi (80.90 km)
- Existed: 1937–present

Major junctions
- South end: SR 39 near Perrysville
- US 30 near Ashland; US 224 in Nova
- North end: US 20 near Oberlin

Location
- Country: United States
- State: Ohio
- Counties: Ashland, Lorain

Highway system
- Ohio State Highway System; Interstate; US; State; Scenic
← SR 510	→ SR 512

State Route 511 (SR 511) is a 50.27-mile-long (80.90 km) north–south state highway in the northern portion of the U.S. state of Ohio. The southern terminus of SR 511 is at a T-intersection with SR 39 about 2 miles (3.2 km) north of Perrysville. Its northern terminus is at a trumpet interchange with the U.S. Route 20 (US 20) freeway 0.75 miles (1.21 km) east of Oberlin.

== Route description ==
Along its way, SR 511 passes through Ashland and Lorain counties. There are no segments of SR 511 that are included as a part of the National Highway System (NHS). The NHS is a network of highways identified as being most important for the economy, mobility and defense of the nation.

== History ==
The SR 511 designation was applied in 1937. Originally, the highway was routed from its present southern terminus at SR 39 to its western junction with US 20 just south of Kipton.

The highway was extended north through Kipton and then east through Oberlin to its current northern terminus at the US 20 freeway just east of Oberlin in 1989. This extension replaced what was formerly the westernmost portion of SR 10, and coincided the completion of the US 20 freeway heading northeast from the Oberlin area toward Elyria. The western terminus of SR 10 was relocated to the junction of US 20 and SR 57 just southeast of Elyria at that time, and SR 511 was extended as a result.

== Major intersections ==
County	Location	mi	km	Destinations	Notes
Ashland	Green Township	0.00– 0.03	0.00– 0.048	SR 39 – Perrysville, Mansfield	Y intersection, western branch is SR 511-A
Ashland	Vermillion Township	6.93	11.15	US 30 – Wooster, Mansfield	
Ashland	Ashland	11.24	18.09	SR 511C to US 42 – Medina, Mansfield	Connector to US 42
Ashland	Ashland	11.34	18.25	SR 60 south – Hayesville, Loudonville	Southern end of SR 60 concurrency
Ashland	Ashland	13.22	21.28	SR 96 east (Main Street) / Center Street	Southern end of SR 96 concurrency
Ashland	Ashland	13.36	21.50	SR 96 west (Sandusky Street) / West 2nd Street	Northern end of SR 96 concurrency
Ashland	Ashland	14.08	22.66	SR 60 north (North Cottage Street)	Northern end of SR 60 concurrency
Ashland	Montgomery Township	14.76	23.75	US 250 – Wooster, Norwalk	
Ashland	Orange Township	18.00	28.97	SR 302 east – Nankin	Southern end of SR 302 concurrency
Ashland	Orange Township	18.35	29.53	SR 302 west – Savannah	Northern end of SR 302 concurrency
Ashland	Troy Township	25.10	40.39	US 224 – Lodi, Greenwich	
Lorain	Rochester Township	30.22	48.63	SR 162 – New London, Spencer	
Lorain	Brighton Township	34.98	56.29	SR 18 – Norwalk, Medina	
Lorain	Camden Township	39.60	63.73	SR 303 – Wakeman, Lagrange	
Lorain	Camden Township	41.05	66.06	US 20 – Norwalk, Elyria	
Lorain	Oberlin	47.45	76.36	SR 58 (Main Street)	
Lorain	New Russia Township	49.88– 50.27	80.27– 80.90	US 20 – Norwalk, Elyria	
1.000 mi = 1.609 km; 1.000 km = 0.621 mi: Concurrency terminus
