= Mapleton High School =

Location
- 1 Mountie Drive; Ashland, Ohio 44805; United States; 40°58′5″N 82°16′52″W

Information
- School district: Mapleton Local School District
- Principal: Corey Kline
- Teaching staff: 17.00 (FTE)
- Grades: 9–12
- Student to teacher ratio: 13.47
- Colors: Royal blue and red
- Slogan: "The Home of the Mounties"
- Athletics conference: Firelands Conference
- Team name: Mounties
- Newspaper: Mountie Voice
- Yearbook: Chevalier
- Website: mapletonmounties.org/39661_2

Mapleton High School is a public high school in Orange Township, near Ashland, Ohio, United States.

== History ==
It was created in 1962 by merging the high schools in Polk and Ruggles-Troy. (Nova's high school had previously merged with Ruggles to create Ruggles-Troy). It is the only high school in the Mapleton Local School District and serves approximately 290 students in grades 9 to 12. Athletic teams are known as the Mounties with school colors of royal blue and red.

=== Athletics ===
The Mounties are members of the Firelands Conference and have been since 1963. They sport the colors of royal blue and red for athletic competitions.

In August 2014, Mapleton became an affiliate member of the Mid-Buckeye Conference for girls soccer.

== Location ==
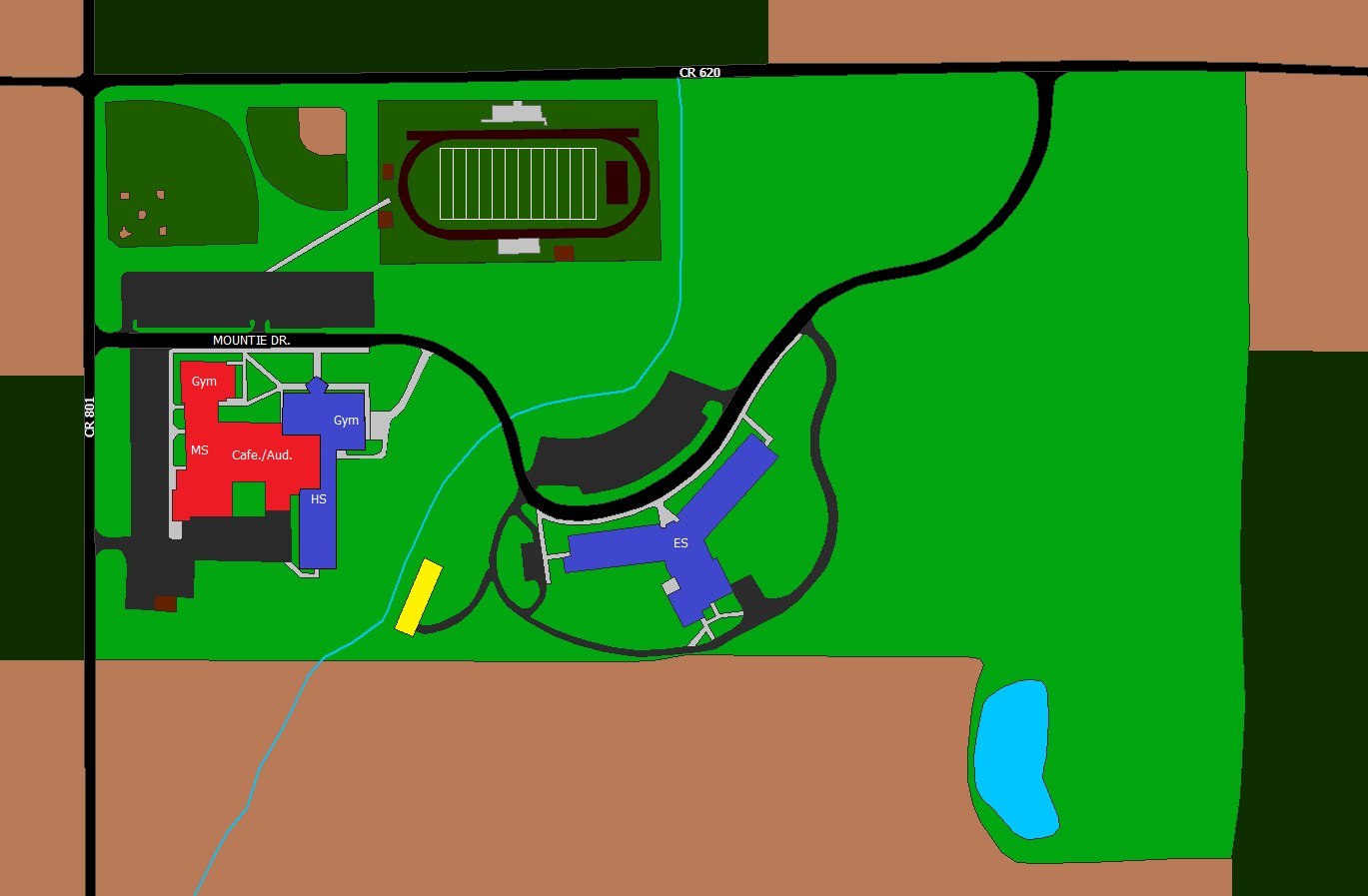
Mapleton's campus at the intersection of Ashland County roads 801 and 620.

All three of the Mapleton buildings are located on one campus at the southeast corner of County Roads 801 and 620, about 3 miles north of Nankin, Ohio. Mountie Drive runs through campus and connects CR 801 with CR 620 after winding by all three buildings. Despite Mountie Drive serving as the mailing address for the high school and the elementary school, the middle school still uses CR 801 for its address.
