= Ohio State Route 302 =

State highway in northeastern Ohio, US

State Route 302

Route information
- Maintained by ODOT
- Length: 28.47 mi (45.82 km)
- Existed: 1932–present

Major junctions
- South end: SR 83 in Wooster
- US 30 / US 250 / SR 3 in Wooster; US 42 in Jackson Township
- North end: US 250 / SR 60 in Savannah

Location
- Country: United States
- State: Ohio
- Counties: Wayne, Ashland

Highway system
- Ohio State Highway System; Interstate; US; State; Scenic
← SR 301	→ SR 303

State Route 302 (SR 302) is a north-south (physically southeast-northwest) state highway in northeast Ohio, a U.S. state. State Route 302 has its southern terminus at a signalized intersection with State Route 83 in the city of Wooster. The northern terminus of the highway is at a T-intersection with the concurrency of U.S. Route 250 and State Route 60 in the village of Savannah.

== Route description ==
Along its way, State Route 302 travels through portions of Wayne and Ashland Counties. There is no part of this highway that is included within the National Highway System, a network of routes deemed most important for the nation's economy, mobility and defense.

== History ==
State Route 302 was designated in 1932. When it was established, State Route 302 was a spur route that started at its present intersection with Silver Road west of Wooster. At the time, U.S. Route 250 entered this intersection from the west along Silver Road, and departed to the southeast along present State Route 302. From there, State Route 302 ran along its present alignment northwest to the hamlet of Lattasburg, where it came to an end at its intersection with what is today the eastern terminus of State Route 301. In 1932, the intersecting roadway in Lattasburg was not a state route. Three years after its inception, State Route 302 was extended to the northwest along its current alignment to a new western terminus at State Route 89 just south of Polk. Then, in 1937, State Route 302 was extended again to the northwest, this time to its present western terminus at the U.S. Route 250/State Route 60 concurrency in Savannah.

In 1938, State Route 302 was extended on the eastern end. When U.S. Route 250 was re-routed to join U.S. Route 30 further west of Wooster in the hamlet of Jefferson via County Road 157, State Route 302 was extended to the southeast to a new terminus at its present intersection with Old Lincoln Way just west of the Wooster city limits. Then, Old Lincoln Way was the routing of the concurrency of U.S. Route 30 and U.S. Route 250. By 1964, a new southern bypass of Wooster opened, with U.S. Route 30 and U.S. Route 250 re-routed onto this new routing. Consequently, State Route 302 was extended to the east into downtown Wooster, where its new endpoint would be at the highway's present intersection with Market Street, which at the time was a part of State Route 76, the predecessor to today's State Route 83. When the eastern freeway bypass of Wooster was extended south of the city's southern bypass in 1981 to link in directly with two-lane U.S. Route 250, State Route 83 was extended east along the former routing of U.S. Route 250 to the eastern bypass, where it then linked up with the U.S. highway heading north. Consequently, State Route 302 was then extended south over the former routing of State Route 83 from downtown Wooster south to its present eastern terminus, where State Route 83 re-joined its former alignment.

== Major intersections ==
County	Location	mi	km	Destinations	Notes
Wayne	Wooster	0.00	0.00	SR 83 (Millersburg Road / Dover Road) – Lodi, Millersburg	
Wayne	Wooster	0.93	1.50	US 30 / US 250 / SR 3 / Timken Road / Madison Avenue – Canton, Mansfield	Interchange
Wayne	Chester Township	6.20	9.98	SR 539 north (Congress Road) / North Smyser Road	Southern terminus of SR 539
Wayne	Chester Township	12.90	20.76	SR 301 north / CR 78 (Elyria Road) – West Salem	Southern terminus of SR 301
Ashland	Jackson Township	18.04	29.03	US 42 – Ashland, Medina	
Ashland	Jackson Township	19.21	30.92	SR 89 – Jeromesville	
Ashland	Orange Township	22.77	36.64	SR 58 (Columbus Street) – Ashland, Wellington	
Ashland	Orange Township	24.82	39.94	SR 511 south – Ashland	Southern end of SR 511 concurrency
Ashland	Orange Township	25.17	40.51	SR 511 north – Nova	Northern end of SR 511 concurrency
Ashland	Savannah	28.47	45.82	US 250 / SR 60 (South Main Street) – Ashland, Norwalk, New London	
1.000 mi = 1.609 km; 1.000 km = 0.621 mi: Concurrency terminus
