= Ohio State Route 89 =

State highway in Ashland County, Ohio, US

State Route 89

Route information
- Maintained by ODOT
- Length: 18.60 mi (29.93 km)
- Existed: 1927–present

Major junctions
- South end: SR 95 near Hayesville
- US 30 near Jeromesville; US 250 near Jeromesville; US 42 near Polk
- North end: SR 58 near Polk

Location
- Country: United States
- State: Ohio
- Counties: Ashland

Highway system
- Ohio State Highway System; Interstate; US; State; Scenic
← SR 88	→ I-90

State Route 89 (SR 89) is a north–south state highway in the northern part of the U.S. state of Ohio. State Route 89 travels from its southern terminus at a T-intersection with State Route 95 approximately 5 miles (8 km) southeast of Hayesville to its northern terminus at a Y-intersection with State Route 58 nearly 3 miles (4.8 km) north of Polk.

== Route description ==
All of State Route 89 is located within the eastern half of Ashland County. No segment of this highway is included within the National Highway System, a network of routes deemed most important for the economy, mobility and defense of the country.

== History ==
At the 1923 Ohio state highway renumbering, the State Route 89 designation was applied to the roadway between Aurora and Canton. This roadway was made part of State Route 43 in 1927 and the State Route 89 designation was assigned to the current route, which had previously been part of State Route 58. In its original 1927 alignment, State Route 89 included a brief stretch of what is now State Route 95 between State Route 179 southeast of Hayesville and State Route 89's current southern terminus, along with the entirety of the current routing of State Route 89. Five years after its inception, State Route 89 was extended to the southwest along the present routing of State Route 95 from State Route 179 to a new southern terminus at State Route 39 in Perrysville.

In 1939, State Route 95 was extended northeasterly from its prior eastern terminus in Butler to the Wooster vicinity. Consequently, State Route 89 was scaled back to its present southern terminus, as all of the former State Route 89 southwest of that point became a part of the newly extended State Route 95. State Route 89 has maintained its present routing since that time.

== Major intersections ==
The entire route is in Ashland County.

Location	mi	km	Destinations	Notes
Mohican Township	0.00	0.00	SR 95 – Wooster	
Mohican Township	3.64	5.86	US 30 – Wooster, Mansfield	
Perry Township	9.04	14.55	US 250 – Wooster, Ashland	
Jackson Township	12.15	19.55	US 42 – Medina, Ashland	
Jackson Township	13.50	21.73	SR 302 – Redhaw, Nankin	
Jackson Township	18.60	29.93	SR 58	
1.000 mi = 1.609 km; 1.000 km = 0.621 mi
