= Crittenden Farm =

- U.S. National Register of Historic Places
- U.S. Historic district
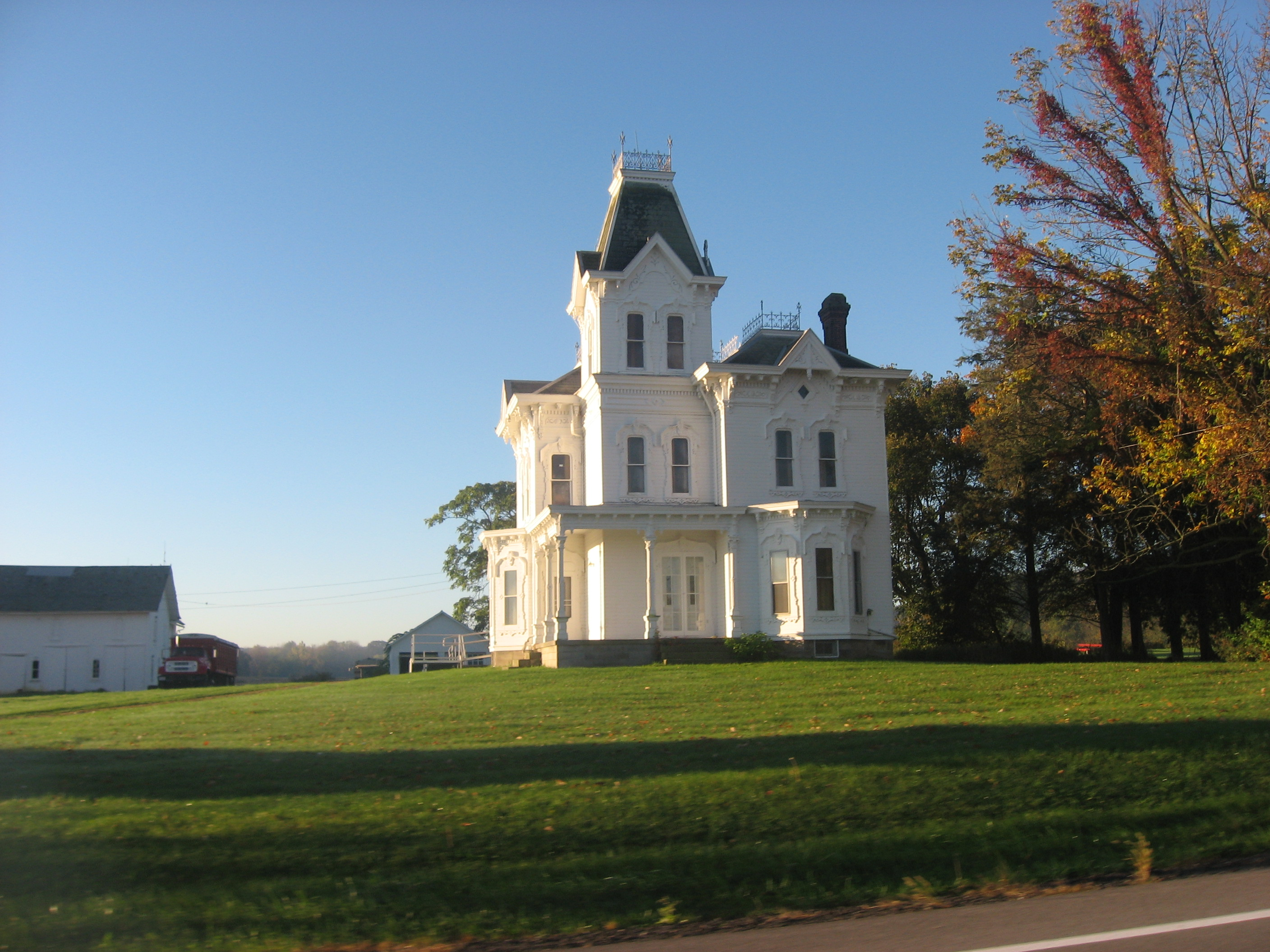
- Roadside view of the farmhouse

- Location within Ohio Location within the United States
- Location: Northwest of Savannah on U.S. Routes 224 and 250
- Coordinates: 41°1′43″N 82°25′37″W
- Area: 665 acres (269 ha)
- Built: 1878
- Architectural style: Second Empire, Italianate
- NRHP reference No.: 82003540
- Added to NRHP: April 22, 1982

The Crittenden Farm is a historic farm-and-ranch complex in far northern Ashland County, Ohio, United States. Once home to an internationally prominent sheep farmer, the complex includes some of the region's most distinctive agricultural architecture as well as scattered pieces of land that have seen almost no changes since the area was first settled. It has been named a historic site because of its place in the area's history.

== Crittenden family ==
In 1836, New York natives Medad and Sarah Crittenden removed westward to the present site of Chicago, where they purchased a full square mile of land. Upon becoming dissatisfied with the place, they returned eastward and settled near Sarah's parents, who were among the earliest and most prominent settlers in Ashland County's Ruggles Township. Medad took up sheep breeding and ultimately purchased large areas of land to accommodate his flocks, which frequently numbered one thousand head. Among their ten children was Alvin, who succeeded his father in the stock-raising business before moving eastward near the Troy Township line and establishing the present farm in 1882. Here, he established an extensive modern farm complex and made his name as an internationally prominent breeder: Crittenden's Delaine sheep were exhibited at the local and state fairs, and both at these levels and at World's Fairs his animals were crowned champions. As a result, there was great demand for his sheep: annually he shipped many to every state in the Union, and he even sent large flocks as far as South Africa; by 1909, some of his animals commanded prices as high as $500 ($17,917 in 2025 dollars).

== Farm ==
A full century after Crittenden established his farm, it remained Ashland County's largest, measuring 665 acres (269 ha) in area. When it was constructed, the farmhouse was one of the most conspicuous features of the property, and in 1909 it was regarded as one of the finest in the region. Built of wood, this Second Empire structure has been exceptionally well preserved: by the end of the century, the farmhouse remained in excellent condition, retaining many components that combine to make it unequalled among late nineteenth-century farmhouses throughout the northern half of the state. Other significant portions of the property include an intact family cemetery and one of the region's few pieces of virgin forest.

== Preservation ==
In April 1982, the Crittenden Farm was listed on the National Register of Historic Places as a historic district, qualifying both because of its historically significant architecture and because of its place in local history. Composed of eighteen contributing properties (fourteen buildings, three other structures, and a site with no buildings), the district includes the farmhouse, various outbuildings, and miscellaneous other structures; unlike the farmhouse, some of the buildings feature the Italianate style of architecture. It is one of sixteen National Register-listed locations in Ashland County; many of the others are located in or near the county seat of Ashland, far to the south, although the John and Michael Crumrine Farms are a short distance to the east near the community of Nova.
