= Ohio State Route 58 =

State highway in northern Ohio, US

State Route 58

Route information
- Maintained by ODOT
- Length: 41.63 mi (67.00 km)
- Existed: 1923–present

Major junctions
- South end: US 250 in Ashland
- US 224 in Sullivan; US 20 in Oberlin; I-80 / I-90 / Ohio Turnpike near Amherst; SR 2 in Amherst
- North end: US 6 in Lorain

Location
- Country: United States
- State: Ohio
- Counties: Ashland, Lorain

Highway system
- Ohio State Highway System; Interstate; US; State; Scenic
← SR 57	→ SR 59

State Route 58 (SR 58) is a north–south state highway in northern Ohio maintained by the Ohio Department of Transportation (ODOT). The 41.627 miles (66.992 km) that make up SR 58 serve the cities of Ashland, Wellington, Oberlin, Amherst, and Lorain in Ashland and Lorain Counties. Its southern terminus is at US 250 in Ashland, and its northern terminus is at US 6 in Lorain.

== History ==
Part of the highway which is now SR 58 has been a state highway since the creation of the system in 1912. SR 144 followed the modern-day SR 58 between downtown Ashland and Oberlin. In 1923, SR 58 was assigned to what is now the entire length of SR 89 and the current SR 58 from Sullivan to Oberlin. The remainder of the current route was designated SR SR 96. By 1927, SR 58 was routed into downtown Ashland. In 1930, it was extended north to its current end in Lorain at what was at the time designated SR 2. The only major change to the routing occurred around 1995 when the southern terminus was moved to the US 250 bypass north of Downtown Ashland.

== Major junctions ==
County	Location	mi	km	Destinations	Notes
Ashland	Ashland	0.00	0.00	US 250 to I-71 – Wooster, Norwalk	
Ashland	Orange Township	3.20	5.15	SR 302 – Savannah, Redhaw	
Ashland	Sullivan Township	9.13	14.69	SR 89 south – Polk	Northern terminus of SR 89
Ashland	Sullivan Township	11.62	18.70	US 224 – Wadsworth, Greenville	
Lorain	Huntington Township	16.62	26.75	SR 162 – New London, Spencer	
Lorain	Wellington	21.32	34.31	SR 18 (Herrick Avenue)	
Lorain	Pittsfield Township	26.11	42.02	SR 303 – Wakeman, Lagrange	
Lorain	Oberlin	28.10	45.22	US 20 – Norwalk, Elyria	
Lorain	Oberlin	30.10	48.44	SR 511 (Lorain Street) – Milan, Elyria	
Lorain	Amherst Township	35.18	56.62	SR 113 – Huron, North Ridgeville	
Lorain	Amherst Township	35.87	57.73	I-80 / I-90 / Ohio Turnpike – Cleveland, Toledo	Exit 140 (Ohio Tpk.)
Lorain	Amherst	38.44	61.86	SR 2 – Cleveland, Sandusky	Exit 164 (OH-2)
Lorain	Lorain	41.08	66.11	SR 611 (West 21st Street)	
Lorain	Lorain	41.63	67.00	US 6 (West Erie Avenue) / LECT – Vermilion, Sheffield	
1.000 mi = 1.609 km; 1.000 km = 0.621 mi: Tolled
