= U.S. Route 30 in Ohio =

Section of U.S. Highway in Ohio, United States

U.S. Route 30
- US 30 highlighted in red

Route information
- Maintained by ODOT
- Length: 245.69 mi (395.40 km)

Major junctions
- West end: US 30 at the Indiana state line near Convoy
- US 127 / US 224 in Van Wert; I-75 / SR 696 near Beaverdam; US 68 near Williamstown; US 23 near Upper Sandusky; I-71 near Mansfield; US 250 / SR 3 / SR 83 near Wooster; SR 21 / US 62 near Massillon; I-77 in Canton; SR 11 near West Point
- East end: US 30 at the West Virginia state line in East Liverpool

Location
- Country: United States
- State: Ohio
- Counties: Paulding, Van Wert, Putnam, Allen, Hancock, Wyandot, Crawford, Richland, Ashland, Wayne, Stark, Columbiana

Highway system
- United States Numbered Highway System; List; Special; Divided; Ohio State Highway System; Interstate; US; State; Scenic
← SR 29	→ SR 30

U.S. Route 30 (US 30) is a United States Numbered Highway that runs from Astoria, Oregon, to Atlantic City, New Jersey. In the state of Ohio, it is a major 245.69-mile-long (395.40 km) east–west highway that runs through the northern section of the state. Overall, the highway runs through rural areas dominated by farmfields or woodlands; some segments are urban in character in the Mansfield and Canton areas.

The first transportation route along US 30 in the state was the Lincoln Highway. In the early 1920s, the corridor was two different state routes in the initial state route system. When the U.S. Numbered Highway System was first designated on November 11, 1926, the new US 30 replaced the other designations along its route. Since creation, the road has been moved and realigned several times. Starting in the early 1950s, various sections were upgraded to freeways, bypassing several cities and villages in the area. Future improvements to the route of US 30 includes a proposed easterly extension of the four-lane divided highway from Canton to State Route 11 (SR 11), near Lisbon.

== Route description ==
US 30 runs for 245.69 miles (395.40 km) through northern Ohio. Between the Indiana state line and Canton, US 30 is a divided highway, with sections of freeway between Van Wert and Delphos; Upper Sandusky and Mansfield; around Wooster; and a final section in the area of Massillon and Canton. Like other state routes, it is maintained by the Ohio Department of Transportation (ODOT). All of US 30 in the state has been listed on the National Highway System.

The portion of US 30 within Hancock County is designated the "Congressman Michael G. Oxley Memorial Highway", in honor of the late former U.S. representative, who was born in and represented that area of Ohio.

=== Indiana to Upper Sandusky ===
US 30 enters Ohio heading southeast, as a four-lane divided highway passing through rural farmland. The highway passes through southwestern Paulding County before reaching its first intersection, 1.174 miles (1.889 km) into the state, on the Van Wert County line; generally north is Benton Road (Township Road 11 [TR 11]), in Paulding County's Benton Township; generally south is Klinger Road (TR 21), in Van Wert County's Tully Township. The route crosses Blue and Middle creeks before it begins a short concurrency with SR 49. Midway through the concurrency, the Lincoln Highway departs US 30 onto a former routing. After SR 49 leaves the concurrency, US 30 crosses Upper Prairie and Hagerman creeks. Immediately after, the Lincoln Highway, which had paralleled, curves around and overpasses US 30. Shortly after, there is an eastbound weigh station, followed by rest areas in both directions. The route then crosses two branches of Hoaglin Creek. US 30 has a trumpet interchange with US 224; this interchange is the western end of the US 224 concurrency. The road curves toward the east, crossing Maddox and Town creeks, passing near commercial properties on the north side of Van Wert. The concurrency ends at a folded diamond interchange with US 127. US 224 heads north concurrent with US 127. US 30 is overpassed by Franklin Street/Marsh Road and Stripe Road, passes through farmland, and curves southeasterly, becoming a limited-access road. While heading southeasterly, the road is overpassed by Gilliland Road, then has a diamond interchange with the Lincoln Highway. Next, it is overpassed by Hoaglin Center Road. US 30 turns toward the east, crossing Spice Run, being overpassed by Gamble and Chenowith roads and again crossing Spice Run. The highway is overpassed by Ringwald Road, then crosses Dog Creek. US 30 next overpasses Dog Creek Road and is overpassed by the Lincoln Highway, reaching a diamond interchange with Middle Point Wetzel Road. Next, the highway is overpassed by Converse Roselm, Bockey, and John Brickner roads. The route then crosses over the Little Auglaize River. After the river, the road is overpassed by Shenk Road and has a diamond interchange with SR 66, providing access to Delphos.

US 30 curves southeasterly, crossing West Jennings Creek, then enters Putnam County, crossing Jennings Creek and Flat Fork. The highway overpasses SR 190, but there is no direct access between the two routes; it then overpasses Jennings TR U-20. US 30 then enters Allen County and has a diamond interchange with the Lincoln Highway, which also provides access to Delphos. US 30 has an incomplete interchange with SR 309. After SR 309, US 30 becomes four-lane highway with cross-street traffic. The road crosses over the Auglaize River, Leatherwood Ditch, and the Ottawa River. The highway now has a mix of intersections and grade separations; it is overpassed by Gomer and Sandy Point roads. Then it crosses Pike Run and meets Watkins Road at an intersection. Next, it has a diamond interchange with SR 115, crosses Sugar Creek, and has a diamond interchange with SR 65. US 30 is overpassed by Stewart Road, followed by rest areas in both directions, then is overpassed by Slabtown Road. The route then comes to Mayberry Road; the north leg of the road connects to westbound US 30 at a right-in/right-out (RIRO) junction; as there is no median crossover, there is no direct access to or from the eastbound lanes. The south leg of Mayberry Road truncates at a cul-de-sac short of US 30. Next is Thayer Road, whose junction is a restricted crossing U-turn (RCUT). The design of this junction does not allow direct left turns from US 30 to Thayer Road: instead, all movements at this junction are accomplished by right turns, right turns followed by U-turns at designated median crossovers, or U-turns followed by right turns. US 30 crosses over Interstate 75 (I-75; as well as over Napoleon Road), with no access to I-75 at this location. US 30 and I-75 parallel each other for a short distance, before I-75 curves toward the north. After I-75 curves north, US 30 has an interchange with SR 696; this interchange provides access to both I-75 and the village of Beaverdam. The road continues east, overpassed by Swaney Road and overpassing Phillips, Pevee, and Bentley roads before crossing Little Riley Creek. US 30 then enters Hancock County and has intersections with County Route 15 (CR 15), Orange TR 51, and Orange TR 52. Next, the route has a diamond interchange with SR 235. There follow intersections with Orange TR 56, CR 12, Van Buren TR 61, CR 9, and Madison TR 68.

US 30 has a folded diamond interchange with US 68, immediately south of Williamstown. After US 68, US 30 crosses over a CSX Transportation railroad track and then has intersections with Madison TR 177 and CR 183, overpasses Delaware TR 185, has an intersection with Delaware TR 186, and then crosses over the Blanchard River. The highway has a diamond interchange with SR 37, before crossing into Wyandot County. There follow intersections with CR 78, Richland TR 79, and CR 81 and is overpassed by SR 293; there is no direct connection between the two routes. US 30 overpasses CR 96, crosses Perkins Run, overpasses CR 97, crosses Oak Run and Tymochtee Creek, and has an intersection with Salem TR 103. The route curves toward the northeast and has a diamond interchange with the Lincoln Highway (CR 330). Next, Salem TR 49 overpasses the highway. US 30 has an interchange with US 23, this interchange is the western end of the concurrency with US 23. US 23 and US 30 head due east, crossing over a CSX Transportation railroad track and having a folded diamond interchange with SR 199. The concurrency has an interchange with SR 53/SR 67, before the road curves toward the southeast. The highway crosses over the Sandusky River and then serves CR 121 with a pair of RIRO junctions. US 30 then has a diamond interchange with the Lincoln Highway, before curving toward the south. The concurrency with US 23 ends at an interchange east of Upper Sandusky.

=== Upper Sandusky to Canton ===
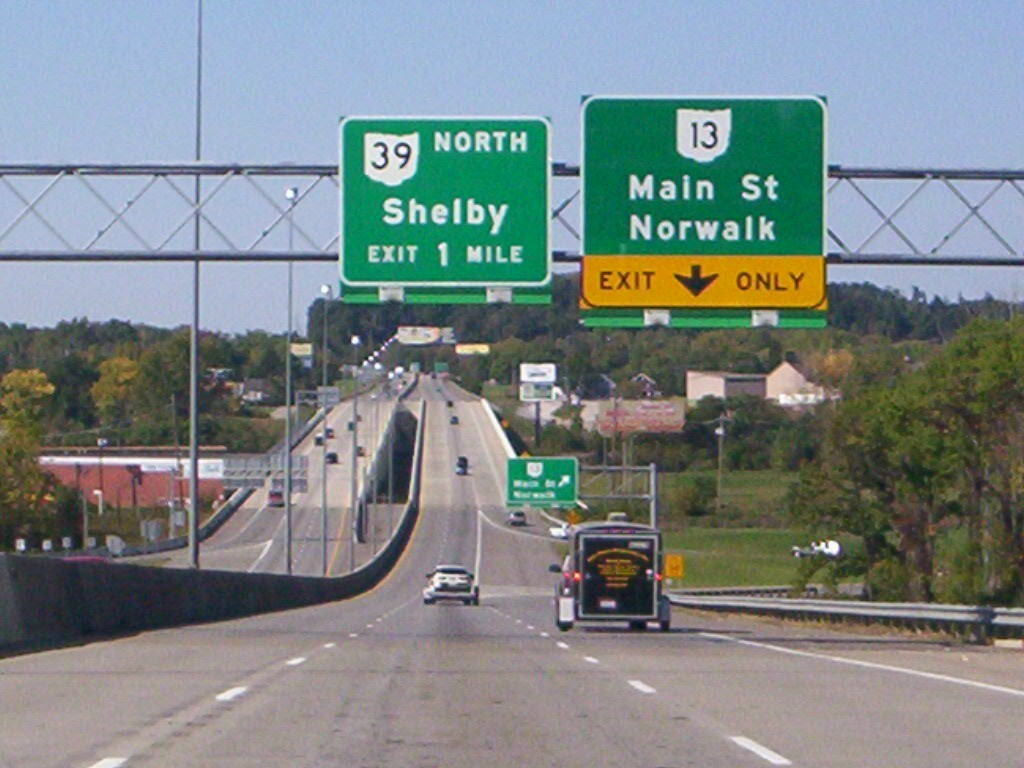
US 30 westbound approaching the SR 13 (Main Street) interchange in Mansfield

US 30 heads due east as a four-lane divided highway with cross-road traffic, passing through farmland. The road has an interchange with SR 231, before crossing into Crawford County. After entering into Crawford County, US 30 becomes a four-lane limited-access freeway and continues passing through farmland. The highway crosses over a Chicago, Fort Wayne and Eastern Railroad track, followed by an interchange with SR 4/SR 19/SR 100. The route crosses over a Norfolk Southern Railway track and has an interchange with SR 98. After the interchange with SR 98, US 30 crosses over a Chicago, Fort Wayne and Eastern Railroad track and the Sandusky River again. The road has an interchange at SR 602, followed by an interchange with SR 598. The road crosses over a CSX Transportation railroad tracks, followed by an interchange with SR 61. US 30 passes under SR 181 and SR 314, with no access to either route. After passing under SR 314, the route enters the city of Mansfield. The route has an incomplete interchange with SR 309, followed by an interchange at SR 39. After SR 39, US 30 crosses over a Norfolk Southern Railway track and has an interchange with SR 13, followed by an interchange with SR 545.

US 30 has an interchange with US 42 and I-71. The road leaves Mansfield and becomes a four-lane highway with cross-street traffic. The highway has an at-grade intersection with SR 603 and an intersection with SR 511. The route has an interchange with SR 60. The road has an at-grade intersection with SR 89. US 30 has an interchange with US 250, and the two routes continue concurrent toward the east. The highway enters Wooster and has an interchange with SR 3. After the interchange at SR 3, the route passes over Norfolk Southern Railway tracks, before having an interchange with SR 302. The road parallels a river, before having an interchange with the eastern end of the US 250 concurrency and the eastern end of the SR 3 concurrency. US 30 leaves Wooster and passes through farmland. The highway has a traffic signal at a T intersection with SR 57. The route enters Dalton and has a T intersection with the western terminus of US 30 Alternate (US 30 Alt.).

US 30 bypasses most of Dalton to the south, having a traffic signal at SR 94. The highway has a T intersection with the eastern terminus of US 30 Alt. US 30 has an interchange with SR 172, and US 30 becomes a four-lane highway with limited access. The highway passes over SR 93, with no access between the two routes. US 30 has an interchange with SR 241, which provides access to SR 93. East of the interchange at SR 241, US 30 crosses over the Tuscarawas River and has an interchange at US 62/SR 21, US 62 continues east concurrent with US 30. The route has an interchange with SR 627, the western terminus thereof, followed by an interchange with SR 297, the southern terminus of SR 297. After US 30/US 62 passes over SR 297, with interchange access, the route enters the city of Canton. US 30 has an interchange with I-77, which is also the eastern end of the US 62 concurrency. East of I-77, US 30 has a short concurrency with SR 43. The four-lane divided highway with limited access ends at an interchange with Trump Avenue. US 30 heads north on Trump Avenue, as a four-lane highway with a center turn lane. US 30 has a traffic signal at SR 172, at this traffic signal US 30 turns east onto SR 172. This is the eastern end of a long stretch of US 30 that is at least four lanes (excluding ramps); the western end of this stretch is in the Chicago suburb of New Lenox, Illinois.

=== Canton to West Virginia ===
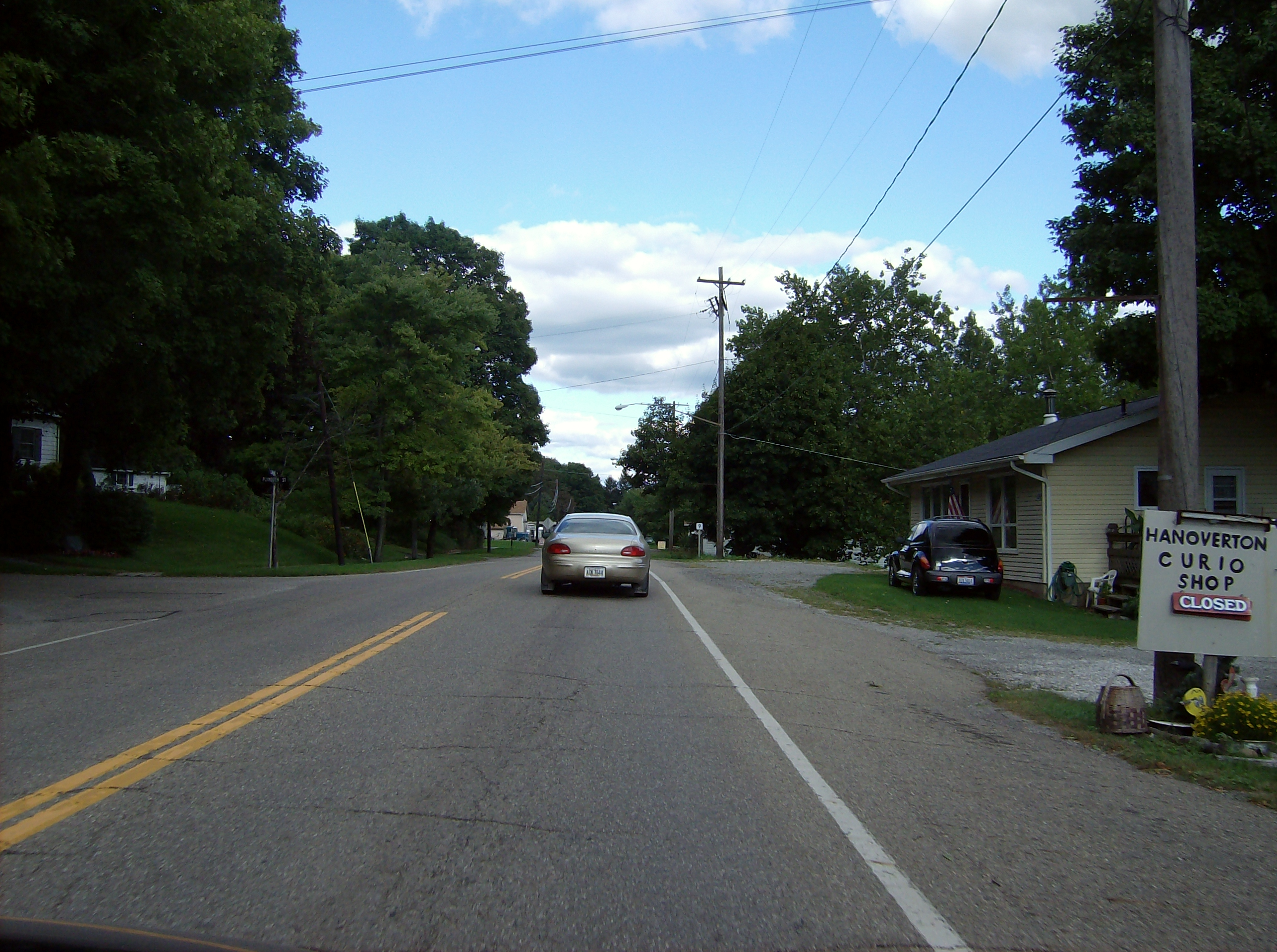
US 30 leaving Hanoverton

US 30 and SR 172 head east as a two-lane highway, passing through mostly residential properties. US 30 enters East Canton, where US 30 turns south onto Cedar Street, while SR 172 continues east. The route turns onto Walnut Street and, one block later, has a traffic signal at SR 44; this is the west end of the concurrency with SR 44. The two routes head southeast, passing through woodland and paralleling a Wheeling and Lake Erie Railway track. SR 44 turns south and US 30 continues southeasterly, passing through woodland and farmland, with houses. The road passes through Robertsville and curves toward the northeast, before curving back toward the southeast. The highway enters Minerva and passes through residential and commercial properties. In Minerva, the route curves northeasterly and has an at-grade crossing with an Ohi-Rail Corporation railroad track. The highway curves toward the east and has an at-grade crossing with a Norfolk Southern Railway crossing. After the second railroad crossing, the highway passes through East Rochester. After East Rochester, US 30 passes through farmland and woodland, paralleling a Norfolk Southern Railway track.

US 30 has a four-way stop at an intersection with SR 9 and SR 644, in Kensington. SR 9 and US 30 head northeast concurrently, heading toward Hanoverton. In Hanoverton SR 9 turns due north and US 30 continues northeasterly, before turning easterly. US 30 enters Lisbon over Little Beaver Creek and is signed as Lincoln Way passing through residential properties. As the highway enters downtown, the properties become more commercial in type. In downtown, US 30 has a traffic signal at SR 45/SR 164/SR 154. This intersection is the southern terminus for SR 517 and the western terminus for SR 154. SR 45/SR 154 continues east concurrent with US 30. The concurrency passes through a few more blocks of commercial properties, before entering residential properties. The concurrency with SR 154 ends, when US 30 and SR 45 turn southeasterly and SR 154 continues east toward Elkton and SR 11. The highway leaves Lisbon and passes through woodland as a two-lane highway. At West Point, US 30 turns easterly, and SR 45 continues toward the south, just before an interchange with SR 11.

US 30 enters SR 11 and the concurrency heads toward the southeast, as a four-lane divided highway with limited access, passing through woodland. The route has an interchange at SR 7, which is the northern end of the SR 7 concurrency. The highway enters East Liverpool and has an interchange with SR 7 and SR 39. This interchange is the southern terminus of the SR 7 concurrency and the western end of the SR 39 concurrency. The road curves toward the east and parallels the Ohio River and Norfolk Southern Railway tracks. The highway curves toward the northeast and has an interchange with SR 39, the eastern end of the concurrency with that state route. US 30 and SR 11 curve toward the southeast and cross over the railroad tracks, before crossing the Ohio River on the Jennings Randolph Bridge and into West Virginia; SR 11 ends at the state line.

== History ==
The Lincoln Highway was the first route to follow the corridor of US 30 in Ohio. The Lincoln Highway was established in 1913, following the current route of SR 309 and SR 81. Improvements and realignment to the highway were planned in 1917 and was to start in early 1918. The route was built to relieve some of the railroad congestion. The Lincoln Highway realignment project was completed in 1939 and moved the Lincoln Highway to the modern US 30 corridor. The Lincoln Highway in Ohio became known as SR 5 between Indiana state line and Mansfield, SR 10 between Mansfield and Wooster, and SR 5 between Wooster and Pennsylvania. In 1925, the Federal Highway Association was established, and, one year later, US 30 was established. US 30 followed the current route of SR 309. US 30's eastern terminus in Ohio was relocated to the West Virginia state line, in 1928. The route became divided in 1932, with US 30N taking the current alignment of US 30 and US 30S taking the current alignment of SR 309.

The bypass around the south side of Dalton was completed in December 1953. In 1966 and 1967, a four-lane section of US 30 opened between SR 49 and US 224. US 30 became a four-lane highway between the Indiana state line and SR 49 in 1969. Between 1970 and 1971, US 30 between Delphos and Beaverdam was completed. In 1971, the section of road between current SR 172, west of East Greenville, and SR 21 was opened to traffic. The divided routes were removed in 1974 with US 30S becoming SR 309 and US 30N becoming US 30. In 1979, the section of four-lane road between Van Wert and Delphos open to traffic. Also in 1979, US 30 between Dalton, and the I-77 interchange was upgraded to a four-lane divided highway and opened to traffic. Between 1983 and 1985, the section from I-77 to Trump Avenue was opened to traffic. In 1999, a four-lane section of US 30 was opened between SR 696 and SR 235. The highways between Upper Sandusky and Ontario was upgraded to a four-lane limited-access highway and opened in 2004 and 2005. During 2007 and 2008, the upgraded section of US 30 between SR 235 and Upper Sandusky was opened to traffic.

In an effort to improve safety and reduce crashes at Thayer Road, which had crossed US 30 north of Lima in Allen County, ODOT converted the intersection to an RCUT, completing the task in late October 2021 at a cost of $2.3 million (equivalent to $2.62 million in 2024). The version of the RCUT used does not allow direct left turns from US 30 to Thayer Road. To the west of Thayer Road, the south leg of former crossroad Mayberry Road was truncated to a cul-de-sac short of US 30 and its median crossover was closed, leaving the north leg of Mayberry Road directly accessible only to the westbound lanes of US 30 as a RIRO intersection. To the east of Thayer Road, both legs of former crossroad Cool Road were truncated to cul-de-sacs and direct access to US 30 was closed entirely. These changes eliminate all cross traffic and turns across opposing traffic for the stretch of US 30 between the interchange at SR 115 and the intersection at CR 15 just across the Hancock County line.

== Future ==
The section of US 30 between Canton and SR 11 has been studied many times for upgrades since at least 1989, including 1991, 1993, 1995, 1996, and 2010. In 2012, the ODOT was studying the section again, with plans to create a toll highway along the corridor. Plans to toll the future highway were rejected in 2013. The expansion was discussed further in 2014, with a consensus brewing that local funding must be involved for the project to go ahead. In September 2016, the director of ODOT approved a regional transportation improvement project allowing the counties of Stark, Carroll, and Columbiana, the three counties along the corridor, to work collectively to secure funding for the extension.

In 2019, a $300-million (equivalent to $362 million in 2024) federally funded project was announced to extend the freeway section of US 30 from Trump Avenue to SR 44. The proposal and funding is set to eliminate a large portion of traffic that travels through East Canton. In 2021, the Stark County Area Transportation Study metropolitan planning organization recommended that US 30 be relocated to as far as East Rochester on a combination of two- and four-lane facilities. ODOT released a report in February 2025 stating that they felt that the completion of the project was not necessary, but the counties along the routing were still encouraging it to be built.

== Major intersections ==
County	Location	mi	km	Exit	Destinations	Notes
Paulding	Benton Township	0.00	0.00		US 30 west / Lincoln Highway – Fort Wayne	Indiana state line
Van Wert	Tully Township	5.07	8.16		SR 49 north – Payne	Western end of SR 49 concurrency
Van Wert	Tully Township				US 30 Bus. / Lincoln Highway (Dixon Cavett Road)	
Van Wert	Tully Township	6.41	10.32		SR 49 south – Convoy	Eastern end of SR 49 concurrency
Van Wert	Pleasant Township	12.15	19.55		US 224 west – Decatur	Western end of US 224 concurrency
Van Wert	Van Wert	14.14	22.76		US 224 east / US 127 – Findlay, Van Wert, Paulding	Eastern end of US 224 concurrency
Van Wert	Ridge Township			Eastern end of divided highway; western end of freeway		
Van Wert	Ridge Township	20.15	32.43	–	US 30 Bus. / Lincoln Highway – Van Wert	
Van Wert	Washington Township	22.26	35.82	–	To Lincoln Highway (Middle Point Wetzel Road)	Exit signed as Middle Point
Van Wert	Washington Township	26.77	43.08	–	SR 66 – Delphos, Ottoville	
Putnam	No major junctions					
Allen	Marion Township	28.40	45.71	–	Lincoln Highway (Fifth Street)	
Allen	Marion Township	29.21– 29.46	47.01– 47.41	–	SR 309 east – Lima	Eastbound exit and westbound entrance; western terminus of SR 309
Allen	Marion Township			Eastern end of freeway; western end of divided highway		
Allen	Sugar Creek Township	37.79	60.82	–	SR 115 – Lima, Kalida	
Allen	Monroe Township	40.00	64.37	–	SR 65 – Cairo, Lima	
Allen	Richland Township	47.01– 47.26	75.66– 76.06	–	SR 696 to I-75 – Toledo, Dayton	Trumpet interchange with left-hand ramps to and from eastbound US 30
Hancock	Orange Township	54.29	87.37	–	SR 235 – Ada, Mount Cory	
Hancock	Madison Township	63.35	101.95	–	US 68 – Williamstown, Findlay	
Hancock	Delaware Township	70.30	113.14	–	SR 37 – Forest, Mount Blanchard	
Wyandot	Salem Township	80.22	129.10	–	CR 330 / Lincoln Highway	
Wyandot	Salem Township	82.24	132.35	–	US 23 north – Toledo	Western end of US 23 concurrency
Wyandot	Upper Sandusky	82.90	133.41	–	SR 199 – Upper Sandusky	
Wyandot	Upper Sandusky	84.15	135.43	–	SR 53 / SR 67 – Upper Sandusky, Tiffin	
Wyandot	Upper Sandusky	86.83	139.74	–	CR 330 / Lincoln Highway (East Wyandot Avenue) – Upper Sandusky	
Wyandot	Crane Township	88.20	141.94	–	US 23 south – Columbus	Eastern end of US 23 concurrency
Wyandot	Antrim Township	94.13	151.49	–	SR 231 – Nevada, Morral	
Crawford	Tod–Holmes township line			Eastern end of divided highway; western end of freeway		
Crawford	Holmes Township	99.07	159.44	–	CR 330 / Lincoln Highway – Bucyrus, Oceola	
Crawford	Bucyrus	102.64	165.18	–	SR 4 (Sandusky Avenue) / SR 19 / SR 100 – Sandusky	
Crawford	Liberty Township	103.75	166.97	–	SR 98 (Plymouth Street) – Plymouth	
Crawford	Whetstone Township	105.05	169.06	–	CR 330 / Lincoln Highway – Bucyrus	
Crawford	Whetstone–Jefferson township line	110.45	177.75	–	SR 602 – New Washington, Galion	
Crawford	Jefferson Township	113.78	183.11	–	SR 598 – Galion, Shelby	
Crawford	Crestline–Galion city line	116.32	187.20	–	SR 61 – Crestline, Galion	
Richland	Springfield Township	121.27	195.17	–	To SR 314 / 4th Street – Crestline, Ontario	
Richland	Ontario	124.89	200.99	–	Lexington–Springmill Road	
Richland	Mansfield	126.47	203.53	127	SR 309 west – Ontario	Westbound exit and eastbound entrance; eastern terminus of SR 309
Richland	Mansfield	127.16	204.64	128	Trimble Road	
Richland	Mansfield	128.08	206.12	129	SR 39 (Springmill Street) – Shelby	
Richland	Mansfield	129.17	207.88	130	SR 13 (Main Street) – Norwalk	Connects using East Longview Avenue eastbound
Richland	Mansfield	129.69	208.72	131A	SR 545 (Wayne Street) – Savannah	Connects using East Longview Avenue eastbound
Richland	Mansfield	130.17	209.49	131B	Fifth Avenue	
Richland	Madison Township	131.42	211.50	–	US 42 – Mansfield, Ashland	
Richland	Mifflin Township	132.61	213.42	–	Laver Road	Right-in/right-out
Richland	Mifflin Township	133.74	215.23	–	Reed Road	
Richland	Mifflin Township			Eastern end of freeway; western end of divided highway		
Richland	Mifflin Township	134.52	216.49	–	I-71 – Cleveland, Columbus	Access from southbound I-71 to eastbound US 30 and from westbound US 30 to northbound I-71 via Koogle Road exit
Richland	Mifflin Township	134.84	217.00	–	Koogle Road	
Ashland	Mifflin Township	136.64	219.90	–	SR 603 – Mifflin	At-grade intersection
Ashland	Vermillion Township	140.43	226.00		SR 511 – Ashland	
Ashland	Vermillion Township	142.71	229.67	–	SR 60 – Hayesville, Ashland	
Ashland	Mohican Township	146.81	236.27		SR 89 – Jeromesville	At-grade intersection
Wayne	Plain Township	156.57– 157.14	251.97– 252.89	–	US 250 west – Ashland	Western end of US 250 concurrency; westbound exit and eastbound entrance
Wayne	Plain Township			Eastern end of divided highway; western end of freeway		
Wayne	Wooster	159.31	256.38	–	SR 3 south (Columbus Avenue) – Loudonville	Western end of SR 3 concurrency
Wayne	Wooster	160.24	257.88	–	SR 302 (Madison Avenue) – Wooster	
Wayne	Wooster Township	161.13	259.31	–	US 250 east / SR 83 south – New Philadelphia, Millersburg	Eastern end of US 250 concurrency
Wayne	Wooster Township	161.69	260.21	–	SR 3 north / SR 83 north – Wooster, Medina, Lodi	Eastern end of SR 3 concurrency; US 30 leaves Wooster Bypass
Wayne	East Union Township	165.36	266.12	–	Apple Creek Road	
Wayne	East Union Township	168.93	271.87	–	CR 94A / Lincoln Highway (Carr Road)	
Wayne	East Union Township			Eastern end of freeway; western end of divided highway		
Wayne	East Union–Sugar Creek township line	170.00	273.59		SR 57 north – Orrville	At-grade intersection; southern terminus of SR 57
Wayne	Dalton				US 30 Alt. / Lincoln Highway	At-grade intersection
Wayne	Dalton	173.88	279.83		SR 94 – Mount Eaton, Wadsworth	At-grade intersection
Wayne	Dalton				US 30 Alt. / Lincoln Highway	At-grade intersection
Wayne	Sugar Creek Township			Eastern end of divided highway; western end of freeway		
Wayne	Sugar Creek Township	175.88– 175.96	283.05– 283.18	175	SR 172 east / Lincoln Highway – Massillon	Eastbound exit and westbound entrance; western terminus of SR 172
Stark	Tuscarawas Township	177.25	285.26	178	Alabama Avenue	Westbound exit and eastbound entrance
Stark	Tuscarawas Township	180.34	290.23	181	SR 241 to SR 93 – Massillon, Brewster, Mount Eaton	
Stark	Massillon	184.02	296.15	185	US 62 west / SR 21 – Massillon, Navarre	Western end of US 62 concurrency; signed as exits 185A (south) and 185B (north)
Stark	Perry Township	185.91	299.19	187	SR 627 (Richville Drive)	Western terminus of SR 627
Stark	Canton	188.90– 189.38	304.01– 304.78	190	Raff Road / Whipple Avenue	
Stark	Canton	190.55	306.66	–	Harrison Avenue	
Stark	Canton	191.05– 191.54	307.47– 308.25	–	I-77 / US 62 east – Akron, Marietta, Alliance	Eastern end of US 62 concurrency
Stark	Canton	191.91	308.85	–	SR 43 north (Cherry Avenue) – downtown Canton	Western end of SR 43 concurrency
Stark	Canton	193.28	311.05	–	SR 43 south (Belden Avenue) – Waynesburg	Eastern end of SR 43 concurrency
Stark	Canton	194.56	313.11	–	Trump Avenue	
Stark	Canton	194.81	313.52	Eastern end of freeway		
Stark	Canton Township	195.49	314.61		SR 172 west / Lincoln Highway – Canton	Western end of SR 172 concurrency
Stark	East Canton	197.39	317.67		SR 172 east	Eastern end of SR 172 concurrency
Stark	East Canton	197.60	318.01		SR 44 north	Western end of SR 44 concurrency
Stark	Osnaburg Township	202.79	326.36		SR 44 south	Eastern end of SR 44 concurrency
Stark	Paris Township				Lincoln Highway (Baywood Street)	
Stark	Paris Township				Lincoln Highway (Paris Avenue)	
Stark	Minerva	208.69	335.85		SR 183 south	Western end of SR 183 concurrency
Stark	Minerva	209.72	337.51		SR 183 north	Eastern end of SR 183 concurrency
Columbiana	Hanover Township	217.11	349.40		SR 9 south / SR 644 south	Western end of SR 9 concurrency
Columbiana	Hanoverton	218.65	351.88		SR 9 north	Eastern end of SR 9 concurrency
Columbiana	Center Township	226.12	363.90		SR 172 west	Eastern terminus of SR 172
Columbiana	Lisbon	228.10	367.09		SR 45 north / SR 154 begin / SR 164 / SR 517 north	Western end of SR 45/SR 154 concurrency; western terminus of SR 154; southern terminus of SR 517
Columbiana	Lisbon	228.64	367.96		SR 154 east to SR 11	Eastern end of SR 154 concurrency
Columbiana	Madison Township				CR 417 / Lincoln Highway (Stookesberry Avenue)	
Columbiana	Madison Township				CR 417 / Lincoln Highway (Stookesberry Avenue)	
Columbiana	Madison Township	233.66	376.04		SR 518 west	
Columbiana	Madison Township	234.49	377.38		SR 45 south – West Point, Lisbon	Eastern end of SR 45 concurrency
Columbiana	Madison Township	234.54	377.46	11	SR 11 north / Lincoln Highway – Youngstown	Western end of SR 11 concurrency; interchange; western end of freeway section
Columbiana	Madison Township	238.28	383.47	239	SR 7 north / SR 267 south – Rogers	Western end of SR 7 concurrency; northern terminus of SR 267
Columbiana	St. Clair Township	240.92	387.72	242	SR 170 – Calcutta, East Palestine	Southern terminus of SR 170
Columbiana	East Liverpool	243.91	392.54	245	SR 7 south / SR 39 west – Wellsville	Eastern end of SR 7 concurrency; western end of SR 39 concurrency; no eastbound exit into East Liverpool (exit 245 eastbound only)
Columbiana	East Liverpool			—	Downtown East Liverpool	Access to Kent State University
Columbiana	East Liverpool	245.55	395.17	—	SR 39 east / Lincoln Highway – Midland	Eastern end of SR 39 concurrency; left exit eastbound; westbound exit and eastbound left entrance extend into West Virginia
Ohio River		245.69	395.40		SR 11 west	Eastern end of SR 11 concurrency, southern terminus of SR 11 at state line; Jennings Randolph Bridge
Ohio River		245.69	395.40		US 30 east – Pittsburgh	Continuation into West Virginia
1.000 mi = 1.609 km; 1.000 km = 0.621 mi: Concurrency terminus; Incomplete access

== Related routes ==
- U.S. Route 30N (former)
- U.S. Route 30S (former)

U.S. Route 30
Previous state: Indiana	Ohio	Next state: West Virginia
