= Mapleton Local School District =

School district in Ohio

Address
- 635 County Road 801 Ashland, Ohio, 44805; United States

District information
- Motto: "Home of the Mounties"
- Grades: Pre-school - 12
- Superintendent: Scott Smith

Students and staff
- Enrollment: 988
- District mascot: Mounties

Other information
- Telephone: (419) 945-2188
- Website: www.mapleton.k12.oh.us

The Mapleton Local School District is a public school district in Ashland County, Ohio, United States, located in Orange Township, Ashland County, Ohio.

== Schools ==
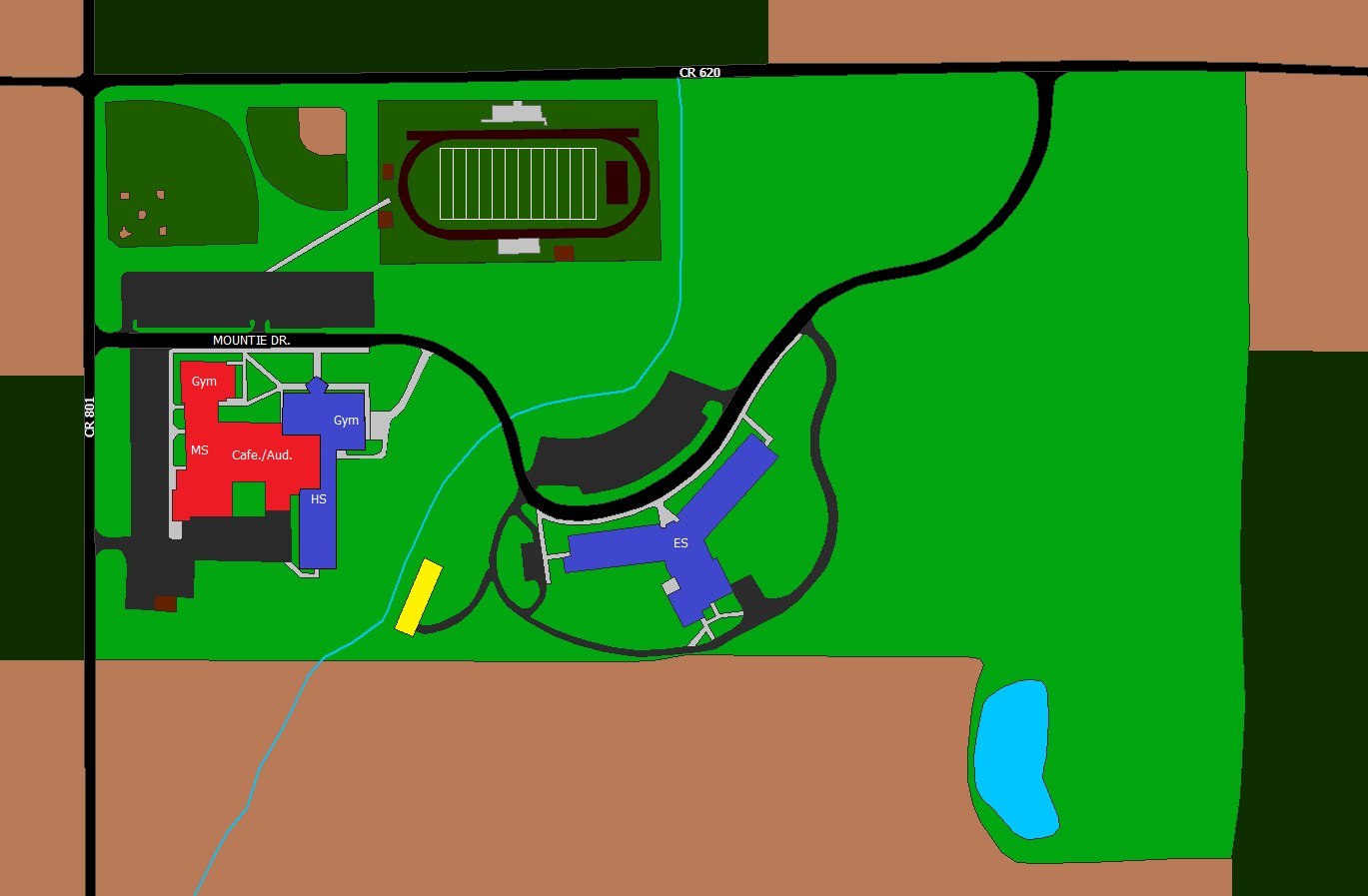
Mapleton's campus is located at the intersection of Ashland County roads 801 and 620.

The Mapleton Local School District has one elementary school, one middle school, and one high school.

=== Elementary school ===
- Mapleton Elementary School

=== Middle school ===
- Mapleton Middle School

=== High school ===
- Mapleton High School
