= Paradise Hill =

Paradise Hill may refer to:

- Paradise Hill, Nevada, United States, an unincorporated community
- Paradise Hill, Ohio, United States, an unincorporated community
- Paradise Hill, Oklahoma, United States, a town
- Paradise Hill, Saskatchewan, Canada, a village
  - Paradise Hill Airport, a former airport

== See also ==
- Paradise Hills (disambiguation)
