= Cinnamon Lake, Ohio =

- Census-designated place
- Logo

- Location within Ohio
- Coordinates: 40°59′01″N 82°11′29″W
- Country: United States
- State: Ohio
- County: Ashland
- Township: Jackson
- Established: c. 1970

Area
  - Total: 1.84 sq mi (4.77 km^{2})
  - Land: 1.62 sq mi (4.19 km^{2})
  - Water: 0.22 sq mi (0.58 km^{2})
- Elevation: 1,184 ft (361 m)

Population (2020)
  - Total: 1,237
  - Density: 764.4/sq mi (295.14/km^{2})
- Time zone: UTC-5 (Eastern (EST))
  - Summer (DST): UTC-4 (EDT)
- ZIP code: 44287 (West Salem)
- Area code: 419
- FIPS code: 39-15008
- GNIS feature ID: 2628875
- Website: www.cinnamon-lake.com

Cinnamon Lake is a census-designated place (CDP) within Jackson Township, Ashland County, Ohio, United States. The population was 1,237 at the 2020 census. It consists of a planned community surrounding a 135-acre (0.55 km^{2}) reservoir also named Cinnamon Lake.

== Geography ==
The Cinnamon Lake CDP is located along the northern edge of Jackson Township. The CDP has a total area of 1.9 square miles (4.8 km^{2}), of which 1.6 square miles (4.2 km^{2}) is land and 0.23 square miles (0.6 km^{2}), or 12.19%, is water, consisting of the reservoir Cinnamon Lake. Muddy Fork, the outlet of Cinnamon Lake, flows east, then south, to the Lake Fork Mohican River, then to the Mohican River and into the Walhonding River and finally the Muskingum River, a tributary of the Ohio River.

No numbered highways run through the CDP. It is located 4 miles (6 km) west of West Salem, 3 miles (5 km) northeast of Polk, and 11 miles (18 km) northeast of Ashland.

== Demographics ==
Historical population
Census	Pop.	Note	%±
2020	1,237		—
U.S. Decennial Census
