= Ohio State Route 696 =

State highway in western Ohio, US

State Route 696

Route information
- Maintained by ODOT
- Length: 9.59 mi (15.43 km)
- Existed: 1939–present

Major junctions
- South end: US 30 near Beaverdam
- I-75 near Beaverdam
- North end: SR 12 near Pandora

Location
- Country: United States
- State: Ohio
- Counties: Allen, Putnam

Highway system
- Ohio State Highway System; Interstate; US; State; Scenic
← SR 695	→ SR 697

State Route 696 (SR 696, OH 696) is a north–south state route in the western part of the U.S. state of Ohio. State Route 696's southern terminus is at an interchange with the U.S. Route 30 expressway about 1 mile (1.6 km) east of Beaverdam.

Established in the late 1930s, State Route 696 is a two-lane highway that runs through parts of Allen and Putnam Counties. While the northern terminus of State Route 696 has remained static through the years, its southern terminus has been in three different locations throughout the Beaverdam area.

== Route description ==
State Route 696 travels through northeastern Allen County and southeastern Putnam County. No part of State Route 696 is included within the National Highway System, a system of routes determined to be most important for the economy, mobility and defense of the country.

== History ==
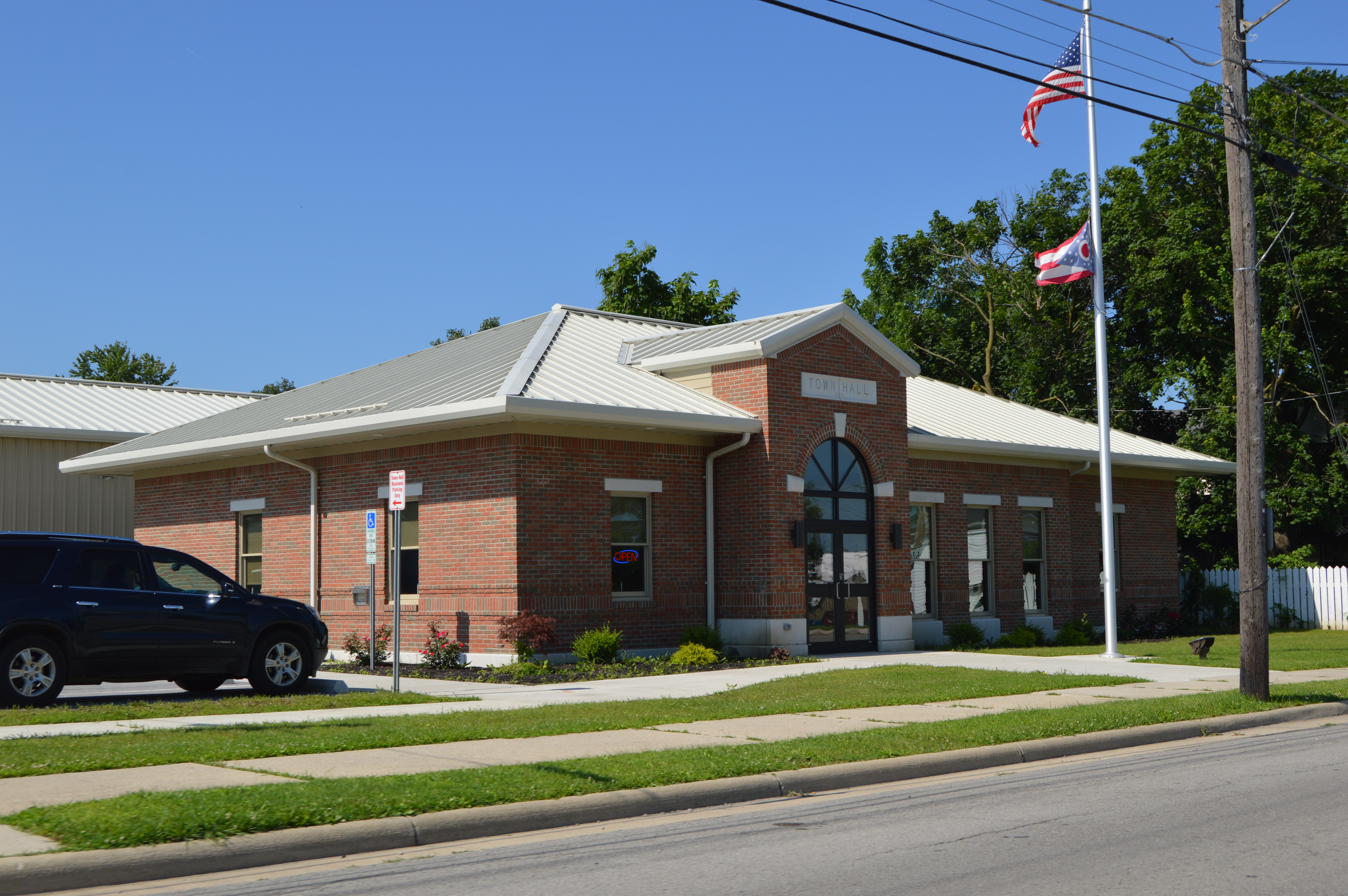
Beaverdam municipal building on 696

1939 marked the year of inception for State Route 696. Its original routing consisted of the majority of the current alignment of the highway, running between the downtown Beaverdam intersection of Main Street (then a part of U.S. Route 30 and West Street {at the time a part of U.S. Route 25 and its current northern terminus at State Route 12 just west of Pandora. In 1955, a new by-pass that would later become a part of the Interstate 75 freeway was opened around the south and east sides of Beaverdam. U.S. Route 25 was re-routed onto this new stretch of highway. Consequently, State Route 696 was extended a short distance south along the former routing of U.S. Route 25 and a small portion of county-maintained Napoleon Road to end at the U.S. Route 25 by-pass.

Then, in 1999, State Route 696's southern terminus was moved one more time. With the completion of the new U.S. Route 30 expressway heading east from the Beaverdam vicinity to State Route 235, State Route 696 was re-routed east from the intersection of West Street and Main Street in downtown Beaverdam, along the old two-lane alignment of U.S. Route 30, crossing Interstate 75 at its Exit 135, and then going on to a signalized intersection with a connector roadway that links with the newly aligned U.S. Route 30 expressway at a new trumpet interchange. State Route 696 was routed south onto this connector, and then arrived at what is now its southern terminus at that interchange with U.S. Route 30.

== Major intersections ==
County	Location	mi	km	Destinations	Notes
Allen	Richland Township	0.00	0.00	US 30 – Mansfield, Fort Wayne	Interchange
Allen	Richland Township	0.86	1.38	I-75 – Toledo, Dayton	Exit 135 (I-75)
Putnam	Riley Township	9.59	15.43	SR 12	
1.000 mi = 1.609 km; 1.000 km = 0.621 mi
