= Widowville, Ohio =

Unincorporated community in Ohio, U.S.

Coordinates: 40°44′58″N 82°19′00″W

Widowville is an unincorporated community in Ashland County, in the U.S. state of Ohio.

== History ==
A post office was established at Widowville in 1890, and remained in operation until 1903. According to tradition, Widowville was so named on account of there being many Civil War widows who lived there.
