= Ruggles, Ohio =

Unincorporated community in Ohio, US

Coordinates: 41°01′46″N 82°23′33″W

Ruggles is an unincorporated community in Ashland County, in the U.S. state of Ohio.

== History ==
A former variant name was Ruggles Center. The name most likely is ultimately derived from Almon Ruggles, a pioneer settler. A post office was established at Ruggles in 1828, and remained in operation until 1904.
