= Paradise Hills =

Paradise Hills may refer to:

- Paradise Hills (film), a 2019 Spanish science fantasy thriller film
- Paradise Hills, San Diego, California, United States, an urban neighborhood
- Paradise Hills, New Mexico, United States, a census-designated place

== See also ==
- Paradise Hill (disambiguation)
