= Clear Creek Township, Ashland County, Ohio =

Township in Ohio, US

- Township
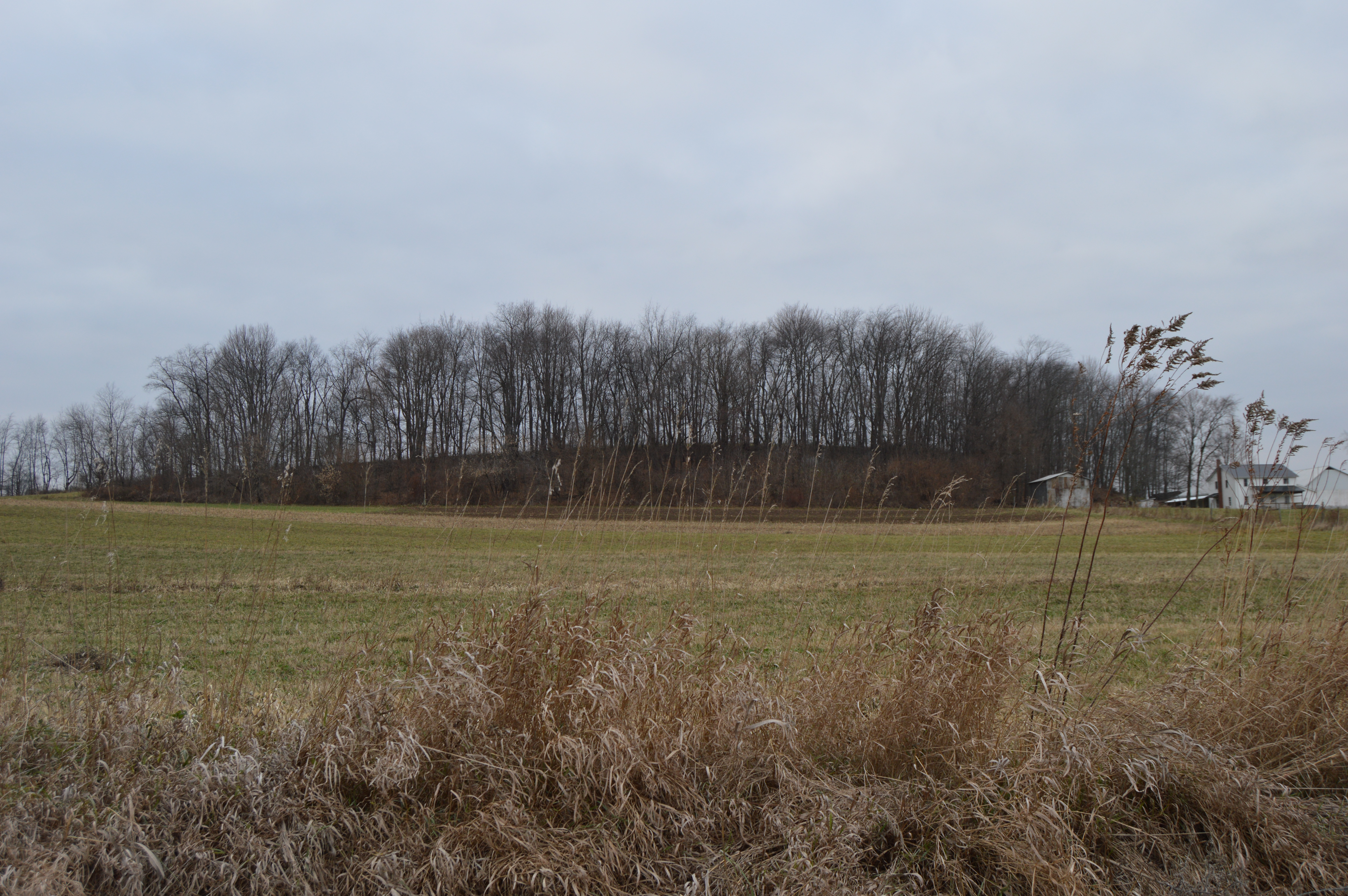
- Sprott's Hill, an important archaeological site in the township

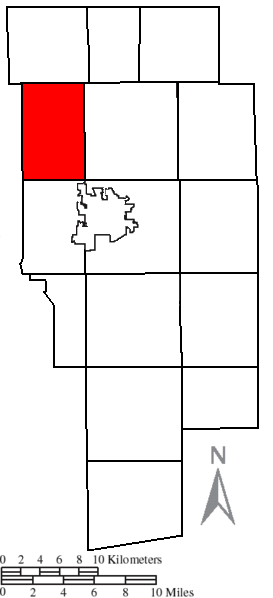
- Location of Clear Creek Township in Ashland County
- Coordinates: 40°56′51″N 82°21′46″W
- Country: United States
- State: Ohio
- County: Ashland

Area
  - Total: 25.4 sq mi (65.7 km^{2})
  - Land: 25.2 sq mi (65.2 km^{2})
  - Water: 0.19 sq mi (0.5 km^{2})
- Elevation: 1,109 ft (338 m)

Population (2020)
  - Total: 2,217
  - Density: 90/sq mi (34.9/km^{2})
- Time zone: UTC-5 (Eastern (EST))
  - Summer (DST): UTC-4 (EDT)
- ZIP code: 44874
- Area code: 419
- FIPS code: 39-15672
- GNIS feature ID: 1085703

Clear Creek Township is one of the fifteen townships of Ashland County, Ohio, United States. The population was 2,217 at the 2020 census.

== Geography ==
Located in the northwestern part of the county, it borders the following townships:

- Ruggles Township - north
- Orange Township - east
- Montgomery Township - southeast corner
- Milton Township - south
- Weller Township, Richland County - southwest corner
- Butler Township, Richland County - west

Two villages are located in Clear Creek Township: Bailey Lakes in the east, and Savannah in the northeast.

== Name and history ==
Clear Creek Township was formed out of the north half of Milton Township on 15 October 1818, and was originally six miles square. Upon the formation of Ashland County in 1846, Clear Creek was again divided, four columns of sections on the east being included in Ashland County, the other two columns remaining in Richland. The last division reduced the township to its present dimensions—four by six miles.

== Government ==
The township is governed by a three-member board of trustees, who are elected in November of odd-numbered years to a four-year term beginning on the following January 1. Two are elected in the year after the presidential election and one is elected in the year before it. There is also an elected township fiscal officer, who serves a four-year term beginning on April 1 of the year after the election, which is held in November of the year before the presidential election. Vacancies in the fiscal officership or on the board of trustees are filled by the remaining trustees.
