= Albion, Ohio =

Unincorporated community in Ohio, U.S.

Coordinates: 40°58′27″N 82°09′50″W

Albion is an unincorporated community in Ashland County, in the U.S. state of Ohio.

== History ==
Albion was originally called Perrysburgh, and under the latter name was laid out in 1830. A post office called Albion was established in 1835, and remained in operation until 1903.
