= Montgomery Township, Ashland County, Ohio =

Township in Ohio, US

- Township
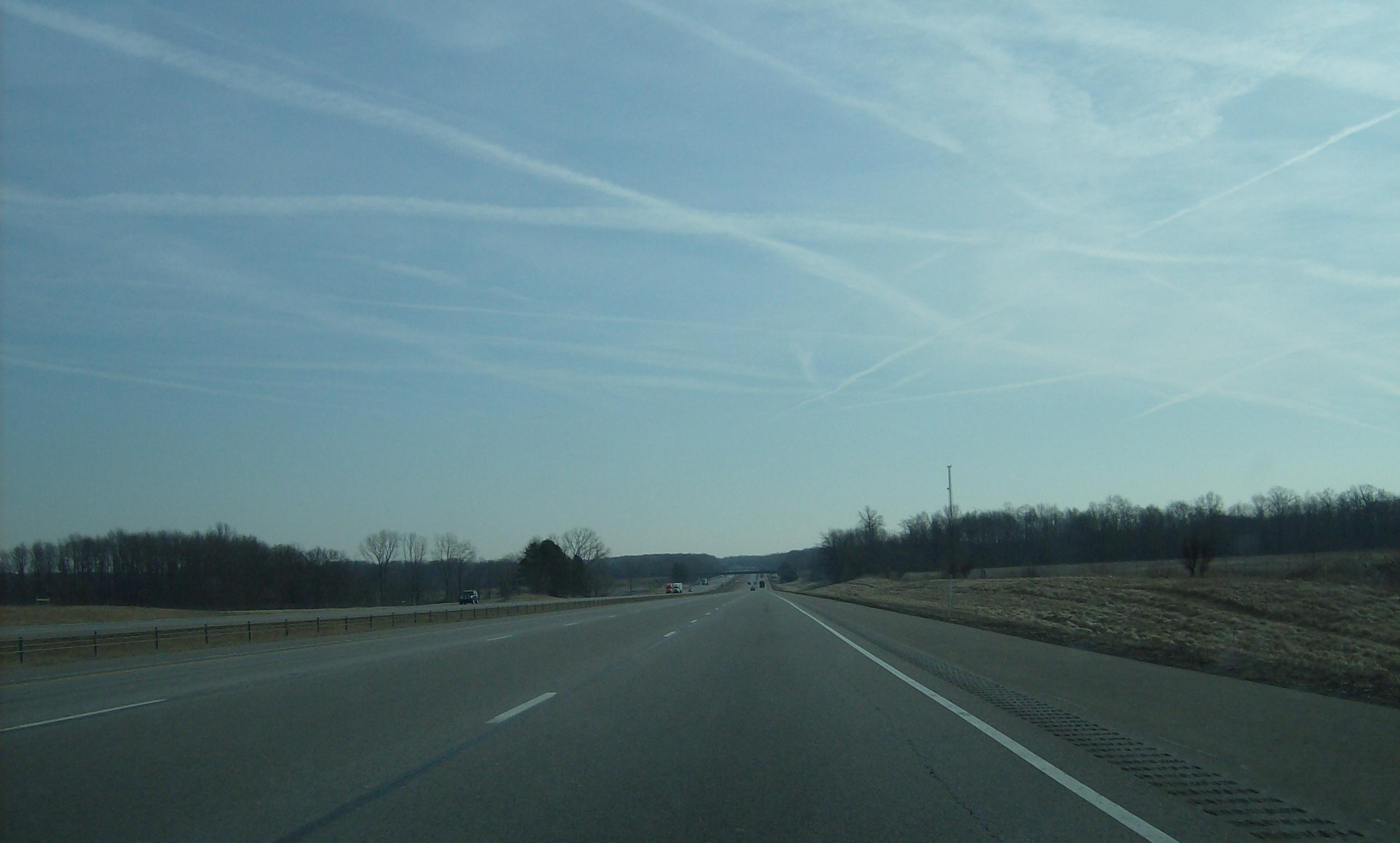
- Interstate 71 in the township

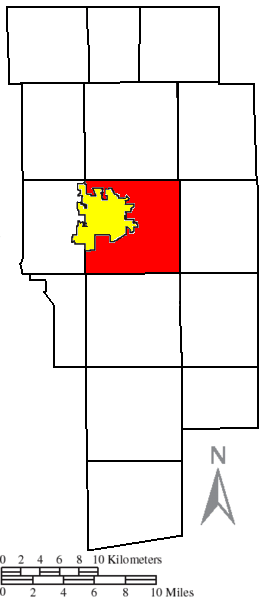
- Location of Montgomery Township (red) adjacent to the city of Ashland (yellow) in Ashland County
- Coordinates: 40°51′32″N 82°16′28″W
- Country: United States
- State: Ohio
- County: Ashland

Area
  - Total: 27.7 sq mi (71.7 km^{2})
  - Land: 27.5 sq mi (71.3 km^{2})
  - Water: 0.15 sq mi (0.4 km^{2})
- Elevation: 958 ft (292 m)

Population (2020)
  - Total: 2,749
  - Density: 98/sq mi (37.9/km^{2})
- Time zone: UTC-5 (Eastern (EST))
  - Summer (DST): UTC-4 (EDT)
- FIPS code: 39-51688
- GNIS feature ID: 1085711
- Website: montgomerytwpohio.com

Montgomery Township is one of the fifteen townships of Ashland County, Ohio, United States. The population was 2,749 at the 2020 census.

== Geography ==
Located in the center of the county, it borders the following townships:

- Orange Township - north
- Jackson Township - northeast
- Perry Township - east
- Mohican Township - southeast corner
- Vermillion Township - south
- Mifflin Township - southwest corner
- Milton Township - west
- Clear Creek Township - northwest corner

Most of the city of Ashland, the county seat of Ashland County, is located in western Montgomery Township.

== Name and history ==
Montgomery Township was organized in 1816.

Statewide, other Montgomery Townships are located in Marion and Wood counties.

== Government ==
The township is governed by a three-member board of trustees, who are elected in November of odd-numbered years to a four-year term beginning on the following January 1. Two are elected in the year after the presidential election and one is elected in the year before it. There is also an elected township fiscal officer, who serves a four-year term beginning on April 1 of the year after the election, which is held in November of the year before the presidential election. Vacancies in the fiscal officership or on the board of trustees are filled by the remaining trustees.
