= Ruggles Township, Ashland County, Ohio =

Township in Ohio, US

- Township
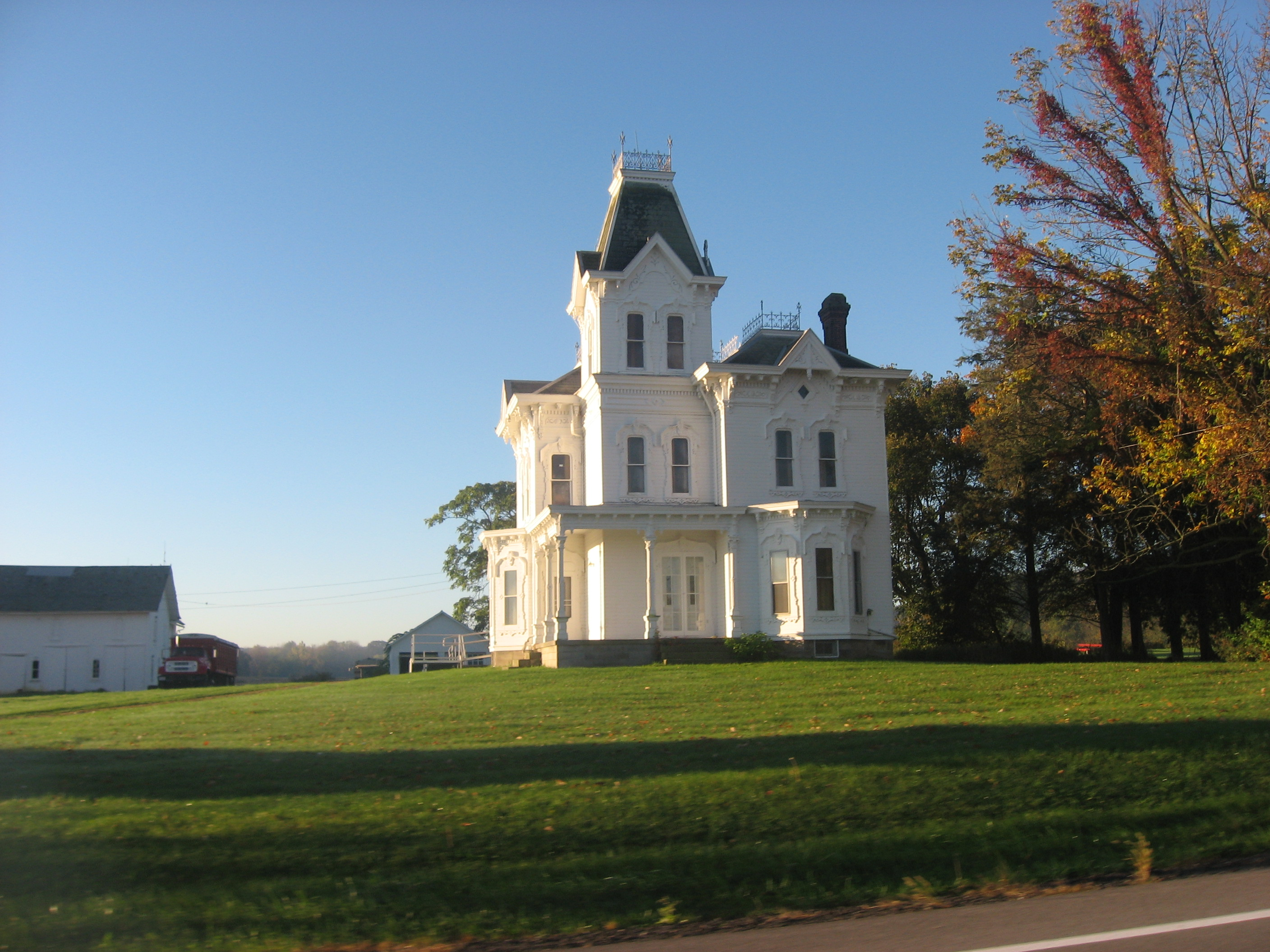
- The Crittenden Farmhouse, a historic site in the township

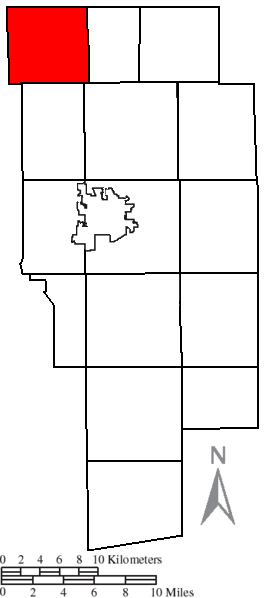
- Location of Ruggles Township in Ashland County
- Coordinates: 41°2′23″N 82°23′2″W
- Country: United States
- State: Ohio
- County: Ashland

Area
  - Total: 26.0 sq mi (67.4 km^{2})
  - Land: 25.8 sq mi (66.9 km^{2})
  - Water: 0.19 sq mi (0.5 km^{2})
- Elevation: 1,086 ft (331 m)

Population (2020)
  - Total: 955
  - Density: 35/sq mi (13.5/km^{2})
- Time zone: UTC-5 (Eastern (EST))
  - Summer (DST): UTC-4 (EDT)
- FIPS code: 39-68966
- GNIS feature ID: 1085714

Historical population
Census	Pop.	Note	%±
1990	678		—
2000	857		26.4%
2010	905		5.6%
2020	955		5.5%
2024 (est.)	983		2.9%
U.S. Census:

Ruggles Township is one of the fifteen townships of Ashland County, Ohio, United States. The population was 955 at the 2020 census.

== Geography ==
Located in the northwestern corner of the county, it borders the following townships:

- New London Township, Huron County - north
- Rochester Township, Lorain County - northeast corner
- Troy Township - east
- Orange Township - southeast
- Clear Creek Township - south
- Butler Township, Richland County - southwest
- Greenwich Township, Huron County - west
- Fitchville Township, Huron County - northwest corner

No municipalities are located in Ruggles Township.

== Name and history ==
It is the only Ruggles Township statewide.

This township is included in the region known as the Firelands and was originally a part of adjacent Huron County. It is named for Almon Ruggles, a surveyor retained by the Connecticut Land Company in 1808 and the first county recorder of Huron County.

Huron County was established by the Ohio General Assembly on February 7, 1809, and at the time comprised present-day Erie County (except a small part in the northwest), Huron County, Ruggles Township in Ashland County, Danbury Township in Ottawa County, and part of Catawba Island Township in Ottawa County - in short, the entire Firelands.

Ruggles Township was added to Ashland County when it was formed on February 24, 1846 from portions of Huron, Lorain, Richland, and Wayne counties.

Ruggles Township is home to Crittenden Farmhouse, a historic farmstead listed on the National Register of Historic Places.

== Government ==
The township is governed by a three-member board of trustees, who are elected in November of odd-numbered years to a four-year term beginning on the following January 1. Two are elected in the year after the presidential election and one is elected in the year before it. There is also an elected township fiscal officer, who serves a four-year term beginning on April 1 of the year after the election, which is held in November of the year before the presidential election. Vacancies in the fiscal officership or on the board of trustees are filled by the remaining trustees.
