= Paradise Hill, Ohio =

Unincorporated community in Ohio, U.S.

Coordinates: 40°51′58″N 82°24′11″W

Paradise Hill is an unincorporated community in Milton Township, Ashland County, in the U.S. state of Ohio.

== History ==
A post office called Paradise Hill was established in 1878, and remained in operation until 1907. In 1941, Paradise Hill had about 10 inhabitants.
