= Nankin, Ohio =

Unincorporated community in Ohio, U.S.

Coordinates: 40°54′51″N 82°17′08″W

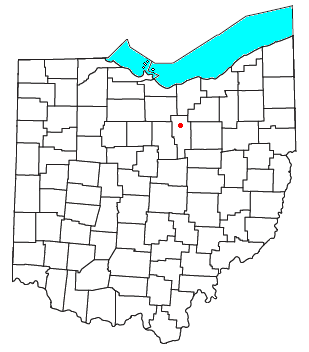
Location of Nankin, Ohio

Nankin is an unincorporated community and Census-designated place in southern Orange Township, Ashland County, Ohio, United States. As of the 2020 census, Nankin had a population of 435. It has a post office with the ZIP code 44848. It lies at the intersection of State Routes 58 and 302 and is near U.S. 250.

== History ==
Nankin was originally called Orange, and under the latter name was laid out in 1828. A post office called Nankin has been in operation since 1833.
