= Beaverdam, Ohio =

- Village
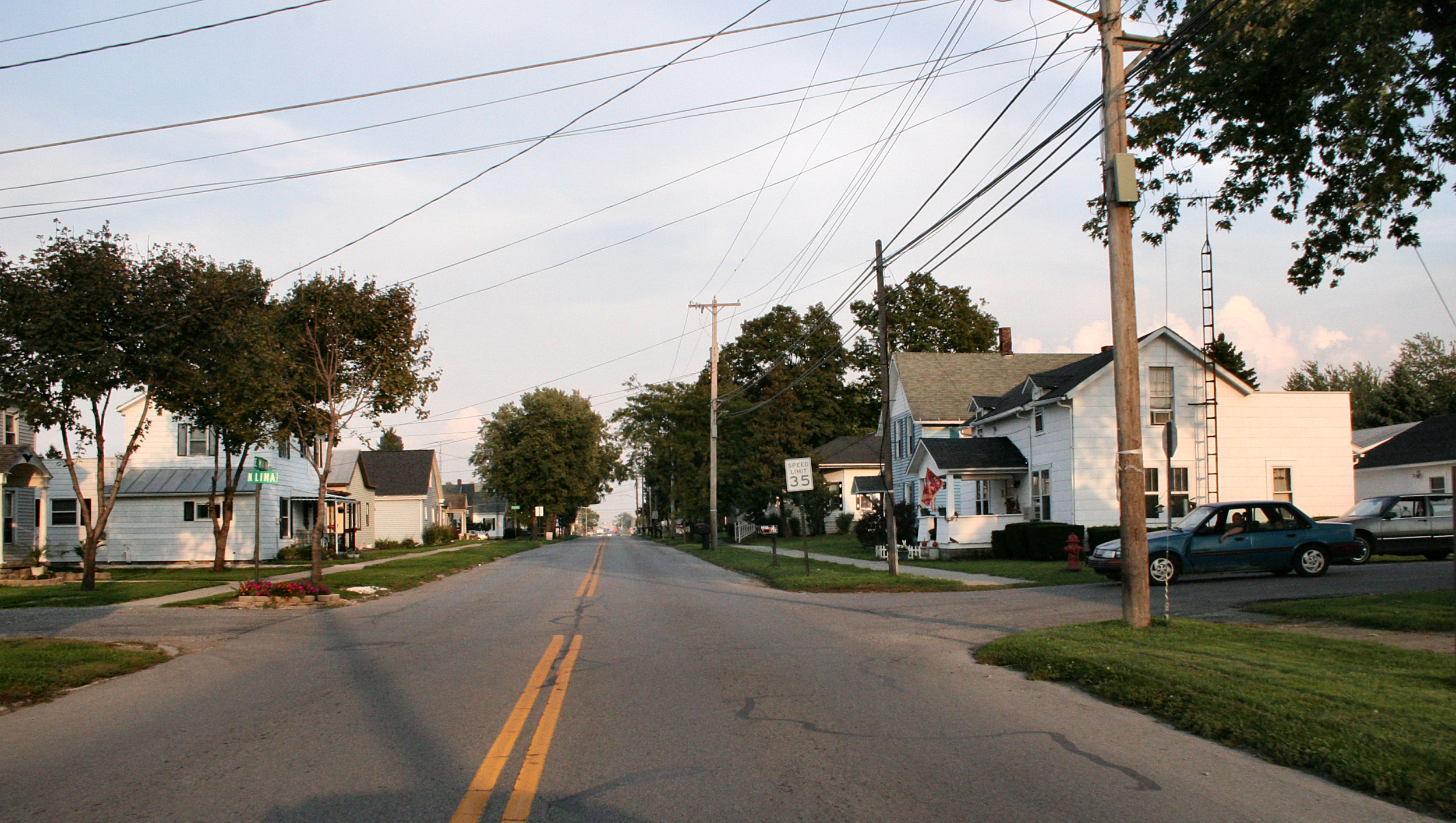
- Streetside in Beaverdam

- Seal

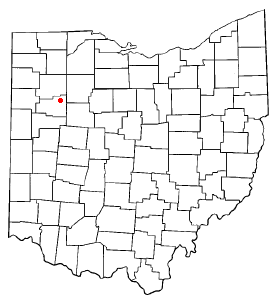
- Location of Beaverdam, Ohio

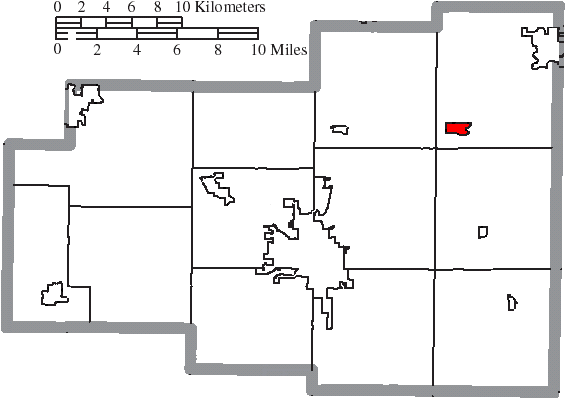
- Location of Beaverdam in Allen County

- Location in Ohio Beaverdam (the United States) Beaverdam (North America)
- Coordinates: 40°49′58″N 83°58′26″W
- Country: United States
- State: Ohio
- County: Allen
- Township: Richland

Government
  - Mayor: Roberta Jean Beemer

Area
  - Total: 0.63 sq mi (1.63 km^{2})
  - Land: 0.63 sq mi (1.63 km^{2})
  - Water: 0 sq mi (0.00 km^{2})
- Elevation: 863 ft (263 m)

Population (2020)
  - Total: 319
  - Estimate (2023): 314
  - Density: 506.4/sq mi (195.54/km^{2})
- Time zone: UTC-5 (Eastern (EST))
  - Summer (DST): UTC-4 (EDT)
- ZIP code: 45808
- Area code: 419
- FIPS code: 39-04752
- GNIS feature ID: 2398061
- Website: www.beaverdamoh.com

Beaverdam is a village in Richland Township, Allen County, Ohio, United States. Its population was 319 at the 2020 census. Beaverdam is part of the Lima, Ohio Metropolitan Statistical Area.

== History ==
Beaverdam was laid out in 1853. The village was so named on account of there being beaver dams near the original town site. A post office called Beaver Dam was established in 1850, the name was changed to Beaverdam in 1895, and the post office closed in 2006. The village was incorporated in 1878.

== Geography ==
According to the United States Census Bureau, the village has a total area of 0.61 square miles (1.58 km^{2}), all land.

== Demographics ==
Historical population
Census	Pop.	Note	%±
1880	353		—
1890	397		12.5%
1900	477		20.2%
1910	455		−4.6%
1920	394		−13.4%
1930	360		−8.6%
1940	377		4.7%
1950	450		19.4%
1960	514		14.2%
1970	525		2.1%
1980	492		−6.3%
1990	467		−5.1%
2000	356		−23.8%
2010	382		7.3%
2020	319		−16.5%
2023 (est.)	314	▼	−1.6%
U.S. Decennial Census

The median income for a household in the village was $39,063, and the median income for a family was $47,188. Males had a median income of $29,375 versus $21,932 for females. The per capita income for the village was $14,750. About 10.3% of families and 8.9% of the population were below the poverty line, including 19.8% of those under age 18 and none of those age 65 or over.

=== 2010 census ===
As of the census of 2010, there were 382 people, 144 households, and 107 families residing in the village. The population density was 626.2 inhabitants per square mile (241.8/km^{2}). There were 153 housing units at an average density of 250.8 per square mile (96.8/km^{2}). The racial makeup of the village was 96.9% White, 0.5% African American, 0.3% Native American, 0.3% Asian, and 2.1% from two or more races. Hispanic or Latino of any race were 1.3% of the population.

There were 144 households, of which 35.4% had children under the age of 18 living with them, 52.1% were married couples living together, 15.3% had a female householder with no husband present, 6.9% had a male householder with no wife present, and 25.7% were non-families. 20.8% of all households were made up of individuals, and 4.9% had someone living alone who was 65 years of age or older. The average household size was 2.65 and the average family size was 2.98.

The median age in the village was 34.8 years. 24.9% of residents were under the age of 18; 9.4% were between the ages of 18 and 24; 25.7% were from 25 to 44; 27.5% were from 45 to 64; and 12.6% were 65 years of age or older. The gender makeup of the village was 51.6% male and 48.4% female.

== Transportation ==
Beaverdam lies at the junction of the old Lincoln Highway and the Dixie Highway. These early highways were begun in 1914.

Currently Beaverdam's economy is dominated by three large truck stops on what is now the junction of Interstate 75 and U.S. Route 30. Beaverdam was the eastern terminus of the four lane section of US 30. This meant that vehicular traffic going east on the four lane portion of US 30 that extended from Fort Wayne, Indiana had to exit the four-lane road and shift to a two-lane road. This required exit enhanced the village's function as an area for refueling of vehicles. US 30 is now a continuous four-lane highway in this part of Ohio that bypasses Beaverdam, but the significance of the junction as a major fuel stop has not been diminished. In the summer of 2006 the exit ramps and overpass on I-75 were widened to accommodate heavy truck and car traffic to the truck stops.
