= Jackson Township, Ashland County, Ohio =

Township in Ohio, US

- Township
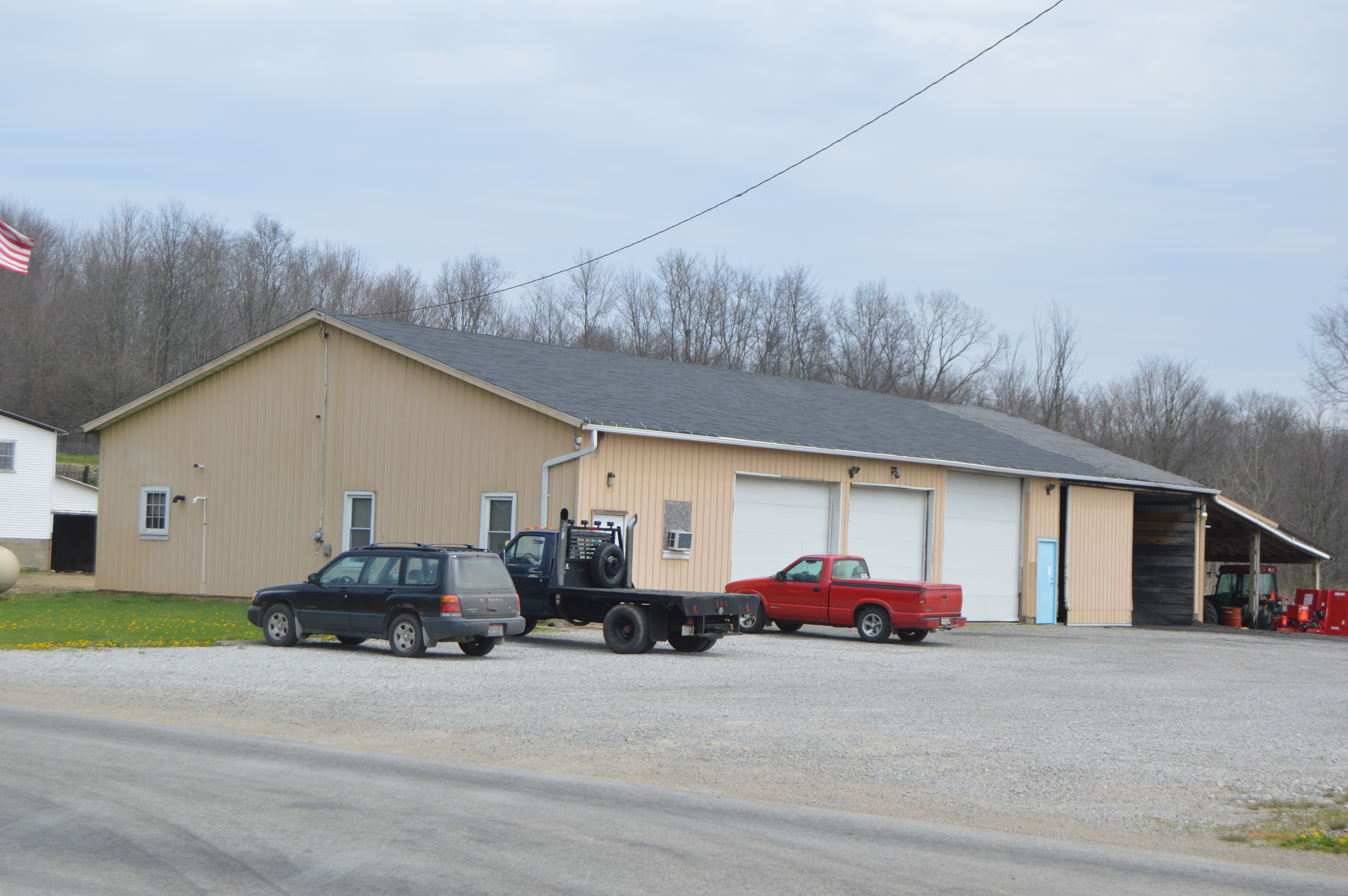
- Township hall

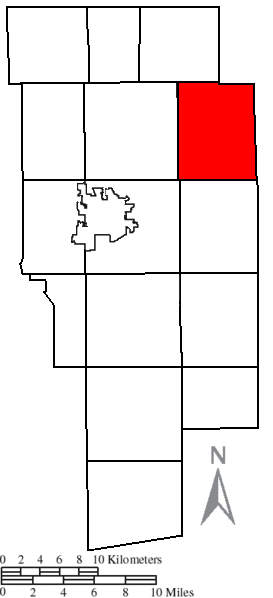
- Location of Jackson Township in Ashland County
- Coordinates: 40°57′20″N 82°10′36″W
- Country: United States
- State: Ohio
- County: Ashland

Area
  - Total: 31.5 sq mi (81.7 km^{2})
  - Land: 31.2 sq mi (80.7 km^{2})
  - Water: 0.39 sq mi (1.0 km^{2})
- Elevation: 1,194 ft (364 m)

Population (2020)
  - Total: 3,884
  - Density: 125/sq mi (48.2/km^{2})
- Time zone: UTC-5 (Eastern (EST))
  - Summer (DST): UTC-4 (EDT)
- FIPS code: 39-37660
- GNIS feature ID: 1085706
- Website: www.jacksontwpohio.com

Jackson Township is one of the fifteen townships of Ashland County, Ohio, United States. The population was 3,884 at the 2020 census.

== Geography ==
Located in the northeastern part of the county, it borders the following townships:

- Homer Township, Medina County - northeast
- Congress Township, Wayne County - east
- Chester Township, Wayne County - southeast corner
- Perry Township - south
- Montgomery Township - southwest
- Orange Township - west
- Sullivan Township - northwest

The village of Polk is located in western Jackson Township, and the census-designated place of Cinnamon Lake, built around a reservoir of the same name, lies in the township's north.

== Name and history ==
Jackson Township was organized in 1819.

It is one of thirty-seven Jackson Townships statewide.

== Government ==
The township is governed by a three-member board of trustees, who are elected in November of odd-numbered years to a four-year term beginning on the following January 1. Two are elected in the year after the presidential election and one is elected in the year before it. There is also an elected township fiscal officer, who serves a four-year term beginning on April 1 of the year after the election, which is held in November of the year before the presidential election. Vacancies in the fiscal officership or on the board of trustees are filled by the remaining trustees.
