= Redhaw, Ohio =

Unincorporated community in Ohio, U.S.

Coordinates: 40°53′51″N 82°09′23″W

Red Haw is an unincorporated community in Ashland County, in the U.S. state of Ohio.

== History ==
A former variant name of Red Haw was Lafayette. Lafayette was laid out in 1835. A post office called Red Haw was established in 1867, and remained in operation until 1904.
