= Nova, Ohio =

Unincorporated community in Ohio, U.S.

Coordinates: 41°01′44″N 82°18′17″W

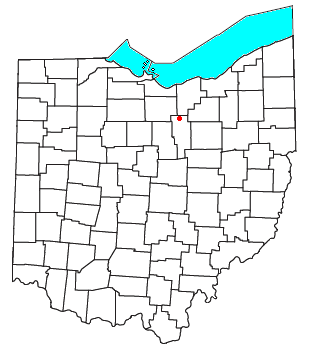
Location of Nova, Ohio

Nova is an unincorporated community in central Troy Township, Ashland County, Ohio, United States. It has a post office with the ZIP code 44859. It lies at the intersection of U.S. Route 224 with State Route 511.

== History ==
Nova was originally Troy Center, and under the latter name was founded in 1851. A post office called Nova has been in operation since 1851.

The last known living apple tree planted by Johnny Appleseed can be found in Nova. The tree produces tart green apples which are used for making applesauce, baking and producing hard cider.
