= Troy Township, Ashland County, Ohio =

Township in Ohio, US

- Township
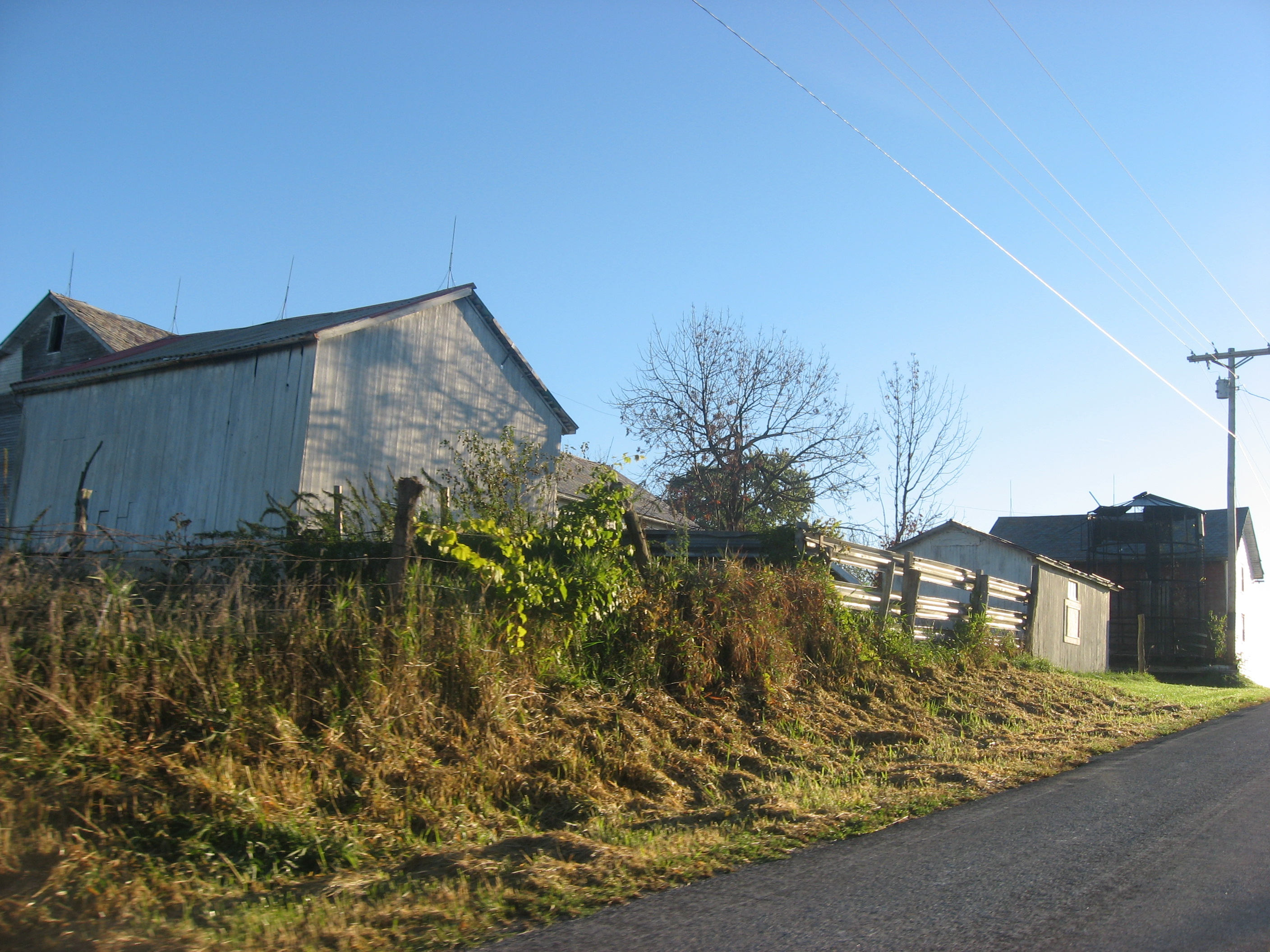
- The John Crumrine Farmstead on County Road 40

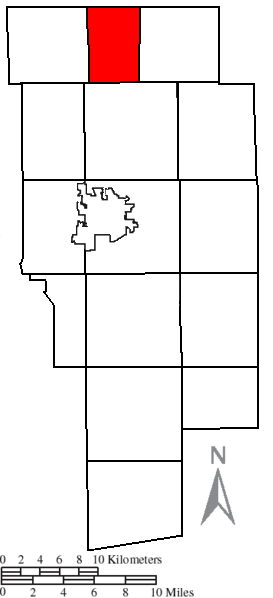
- Location of Troy Township in Ashland County
- Coordinates: 41°1′52″N 82°18′22″W
- Country: United States
- State: Ohio
- County: Ashland

Area
  - Total: 16.9 sq mi (43.8 km^{2})
  - Land: 16.8 sq mi (43.4 km^{2})
  - Water: 0.15 sq mi (0.4 km^{2})
- Elevation: 1,122 ft (342 m)

Population (2020)
  - Total: 1,101
  - Density: 68/sq mi (26.1/km^{2})
- Time zone: UTC-5 (Eastern (EST))
  - Summer (DST): UTC-4 (EDT)
- FIPS code: 39-77532
- GNIS feature ID: 1085716
- Website: www.troytwp.org

Troy Township is one of the fifteen townships of Ashland County, Ohio, United States. The population was 1,101 at the 2020 census.

== Geography ==
Located in the northern part of the county, it borders the following townships:

- Rochester Township, Lorain County - north
- Huntington Township, Lorain County - northeast corner
- Sullivan Township - east
- Orange Township - south
- Ruggles Township - west
- New London Township, Huron County - northwest corner

No municipalities are located in Troy Township, although the unincorporated community of Nova is located in the center of the township.

== Name and history ==
It is one of seven Troy Townships statewide.

The township was first surveyed in 1806, at which time the territory was composed of thick woods, but not officially organized or named until 1835. It was named for the dog of an early settler.

Troy Township was organized as part of Lorain County, and then it was added to Ashland County when it was formed on February 24, 1846 from portions of Huron, Lorain, Richland, and Wayne counties.

== Government ==
The township is governed by a three-member board of trustees, who are elected in November of odd-numbered years to a four-year term beginning on the following January 1. Two are elected in the year after the presidential election and one is elected in the year before it. There is also an elected township fiscal officer, who serves a four-year term beginning on April 1 of the year after the election, which is held in November of the year before the presidential election. Vacancies in the fiscal officership or on the board of trustees are filled by the remaining trustees.
