= Polk, Ohio =

- Village
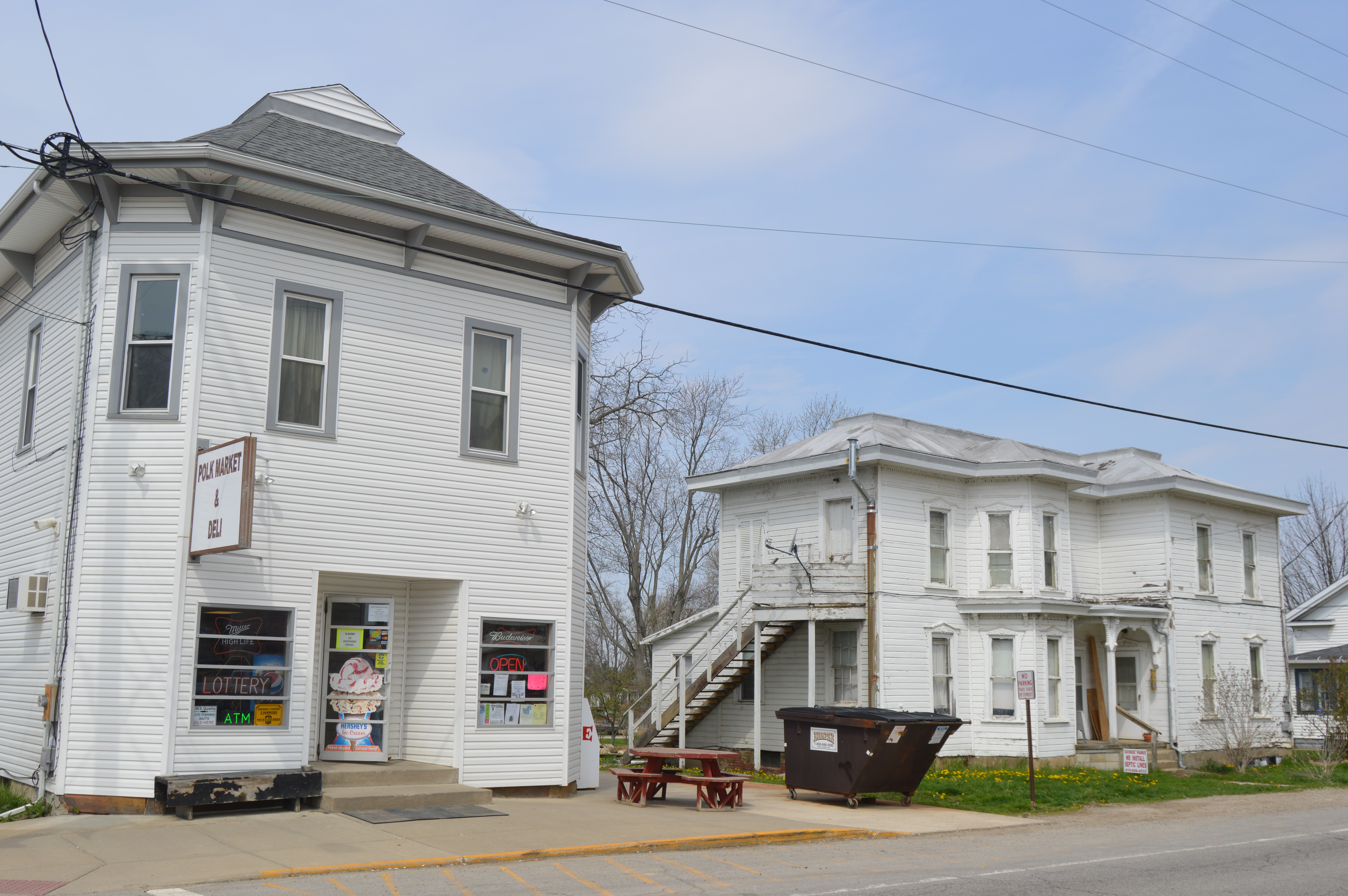
- Main Street

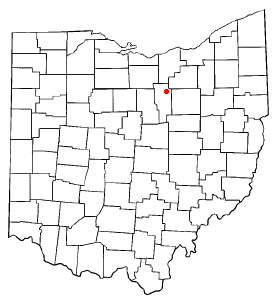
- Location of Polk, Ohio

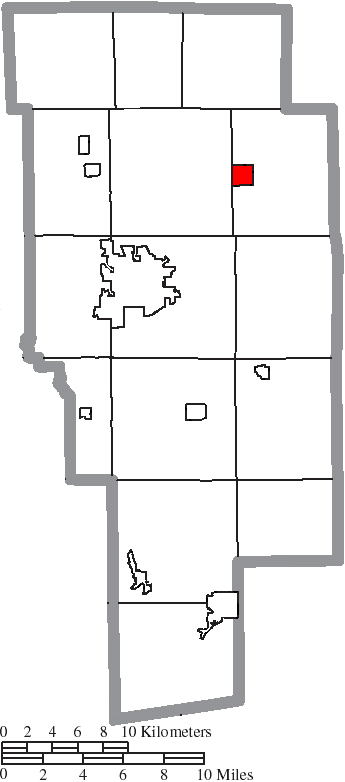
- Location of Polk in Ashland County
- Coordinates: 40°56′42″N 82°12′53″W
- Country: United States
- State: Ohio
- County: Ashland
- Township: Jackson

Area
  - Total: 1.03 sq mi (2.68 km^{2})
  - Land: 1.01 sq mi (2.62 km^{2})
  - Water: 0.023 sq mi (0.06 km^{2})
- Elevation: 1,266 ft (386 m)

Population (2020)
  - Total: 310
  - Density: 306.3/sq mi (118.25/km^{2})
- Time zone: UTC-5 (Eastern (EST))
  - Summer (DST): UTC-4 (EDT)
- ZIP code: 44866
- Area code: 419
- FIPS code: 39-63996
- GNIS feature ID: 2398993

Polk is a village in Jackson Township, Ashland County, Ohio, United States. The population was 310 at the 2020 census.

== History ==
Polk was laid out in 1849. A post office called Polk has been in operation since 1846.

== Geography ==
According to the United States Census Bureau, the village has a total area of 1.03 square miles (2.67 km^{2}), of which 1.01 square miles (2.62 km^{2}) is land and 0.02 square miles (0.05 km^{2}) is water.

== Demographics ==
Historical population
Census	Pop.	Note	%±
1880	335		—
1890	264		−21.2%
1900	232		−12.1%
1910	250		7.8%
1920	263		5.2%
1930	274		4.2%
1940	275		0.4%
1950	332		20.7%
1960	358		7.8%
1970	435		21.5%
1980	351		−19.3%
1990	355		1.1%
2000	357		0.6%
2010	336		−5.9%
2020	310		−7.7%
U.S. Decennial Census

=== 2010 census ===
As of the census of 2010, there were 336 people, 129 households, and 87 families living in the village. The population density was 332.7 inhabitants per square mile (128.5/km^{2}). There were 136 housing units at an average density of 134.7 per square mile (52.0/km^{2}). The racial makeup of the village was 97.0% White, 0.3% African American, 0.9% from other races, and 1.8% from two or more races. Hispanic or Latino of any race were 2.4% of the population.

There were 129 households, of which 34.9% had children under the age of 18 living with them, 52.7% were married couples living together, 8.5% had a female householder with no husband present, 6.2% had a male householder with no wife present, and 32.6% were non-families. 27.9% of all households were made up of individuals, and 11.7% had someone living alone who was 65 years of age or older. The average household size was 2.60 and the average family size was 3.10.

The median age in the village was 39.3 years. 27.1% of residents were under the age of 18; 3.8% were between the ages of 18 and 24; 30.1% were from 25 to 44; 27.6% were from 45 to 64; and 11.3% were 65 years of age or older. The gender makeup of the village was 47.6% male and 52.4% female.

=== 2000 census ===
As of the census of 2000, there were 357 people, 124 households, and 103 families living in the village. The population density was 354.1 inhabitants per square mile (136.7/km^{2}). There were 127 housing units at an average density of 126.0 per square mile (48.6/km^{2}). The racial makeup of the village was 98.60% White, 0.56% Native American, and 0.84% from two or more races.

There were 124 households, out of which 37.9% had children under the age of 18 living with them, 68.5% were married couples living together, 8.1% had a female householder with no husband present, and 16.9% were non-families. 13.7% of all households were made up of individuals, and 6.5% had someone living alone who was 65 years of age or older. The average household size was 2.88 and the average family size was 3.12.

In the village, the population was spread out, with 26.6% under the age of 18, 10.4% from 18 to 24, 30.3% from 25 to 44, 21.6% from 45 to 64, and 11.2% who were 65 years of age or older. The median age was 34 years. For every 100 females there were 87.9 males. For every 100 females age 18 and over, there were 91.2 males.

The median income for a household in the village was $41,875, and the median income for a family was $43,750. Males had a median income of $30,583 versus $21,250 for females. The per capita income for the village was $16,159. About 4.0% of families and 5.0% of the population were below the poverty line, including 10.5% of those under age 18 and 10.9% of those age 65 or over.

== Notable people ==
- Tully "Topsy" Hartsel, Major League Baseball outfielder
- Stanley Eric Reinhart, World War II commander
