= Orange Township, Ashland County, Ohio =

Township in Ohio, US

Orange Township
- Civil township
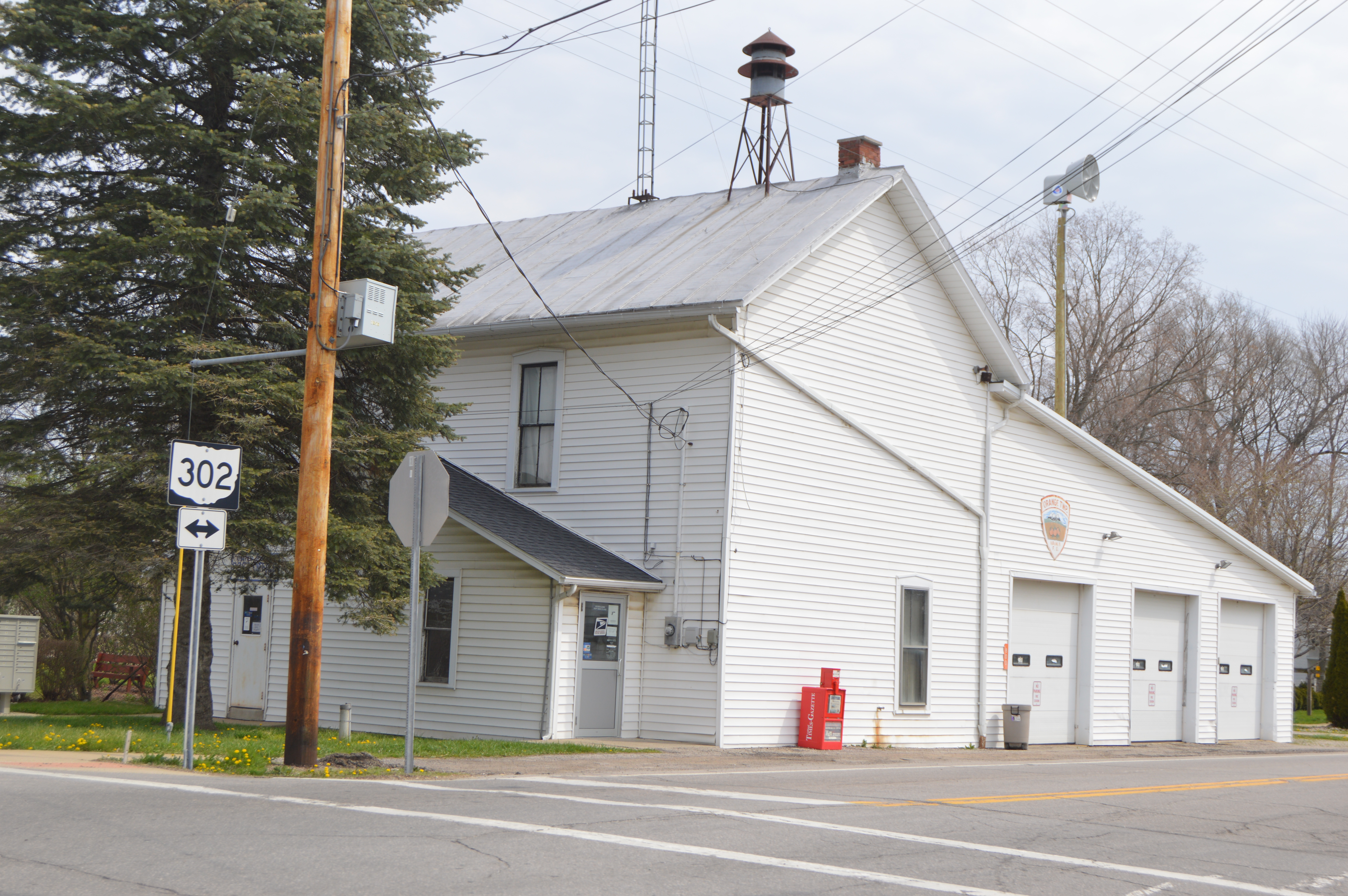
- Fire station and post office in Nankin

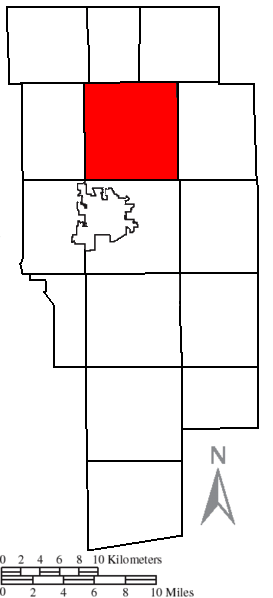
- Location of Orange Township in Ashland County.
- Coordinates: 40°56′26″N 82°16′58″W
- Country: United States
- State: Ohio
- County: Ashland

Area
  - Total: 38.0 sq mi (98.4 km^{2})
  - Land: 37.8 sq mi (97.9 km^{2})
  - Water: 0.19 sq mi (0.5 km^{2})
- Elevation: 1,178 ft (359 m)

Population (2020)
  - Total: 2,569
  - Density: 67/sq mi (25.8/km^{2})
- Time zone: UTC-5 (Eastern (EST))
  - Summer (DST): UTC-4 (EDT)
- FIPS code: 39-58562
- GNIS feature ID: 1085712
- Website: https://orangetwp.net/

Orange Township is one of the fifteen townships of Ashland County, Ohio, United States. The population was 2,569 at the 2020 census.

== Geography ==
Located in the north central part of the county, it borders the following townships:

- Troy Township - north
- Sullivan Township - northeast
- Jackson Township - east
- Montgomery Township - south
- Milton Township - southwest corner
- Clear Creek Township - west
- Ruggles Township - northwest

No municipalities are located in Orange Township, although the unincorporated community of Nankin is located in the township's south.

Orange Township is the location for the Mapleton Local School District buildings, which are at the southeast corner of county roads 801 and 620, about 3 miles north of Nankin.

== Name and history ==
It is one of six Orange Townships statewide.

== Government ==
The township is governed by a three-member board of trustees, who are elected in November of odd-numbered years to a four-year term beginning on the following January 1. Two are elected in the year after the presidential election and one is elected in the year before it. There is also an elected township fiscal officer, who serves a four-year term beginning on April 1 of the year after the election, which is held in November of the year before the presidential election. Vacancies in the fiscal officership or on the board of trustees are filled by the remaining trustees.

Orange Township is part of the Mapleton Local School District.
