= Ashland County, Ohio =

County in Ohio, United States

- County
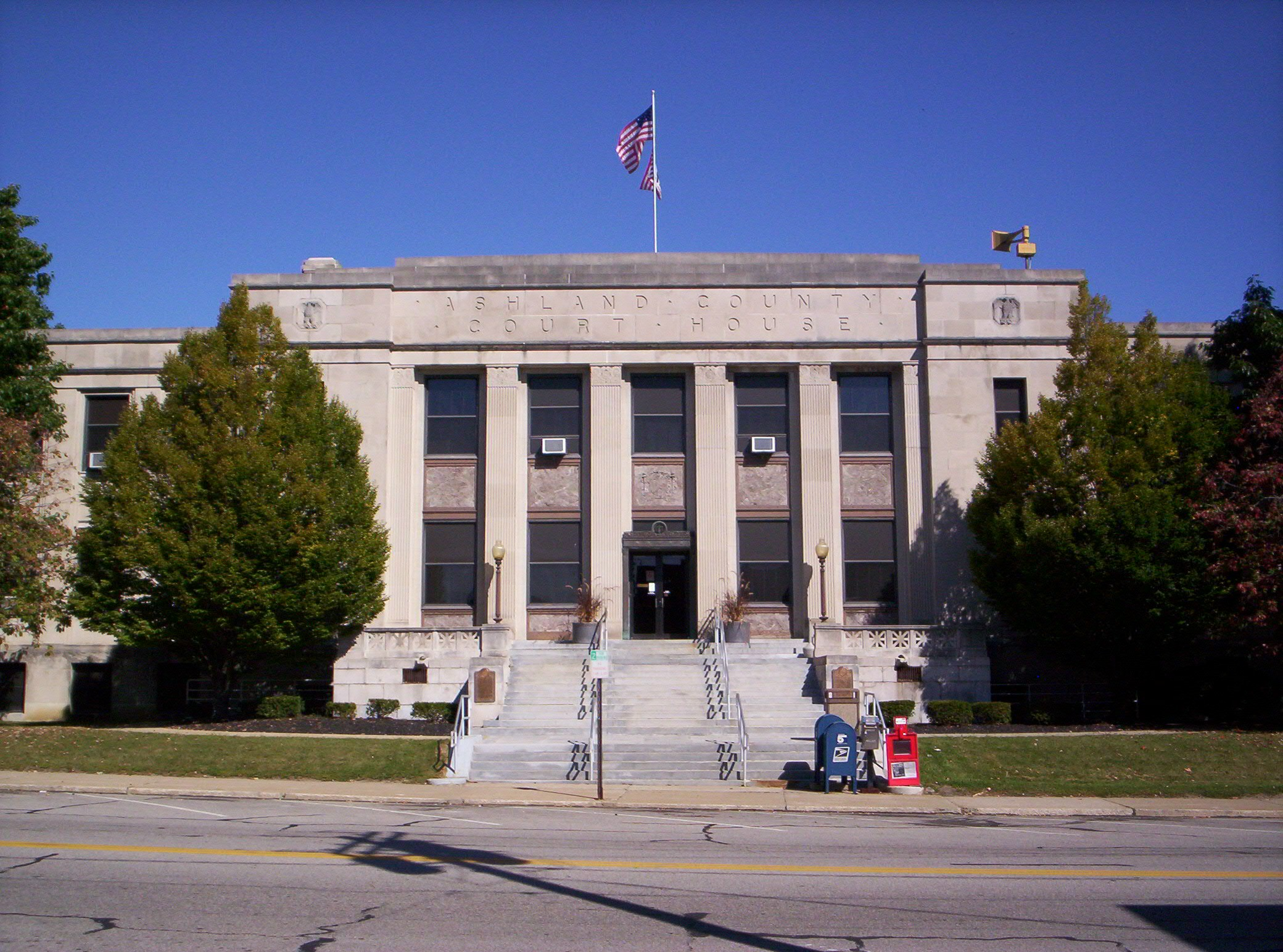
- Ashland County Courthouse

- Flag Seal

- Location within the U.S. state of Ohio
- Coordinates: 40°50′N 82°16′W
- Country: United States
- State: Ohio
- Founded: February 24, 1846
- Named for: "Ashland", Henry Clay's home
- Seat: Ashland
- Largest city: Ashland

Area
  - Total: 427 sq mi (1,110 km^{2})
  - Land: 423 sq mi (1,100 km^{2})
  - Water: 3.8 sq mi (9.8 km^{2}) 0.9%

Population (2020)
  - Total: 52,447
  - Estimate (2025): 52,523 ▲
  - Density: 124/sq mi (48/km^{2})
- Time zone: UTC−5 (Eastern)
  - Summer (DST): UTC−4 (EDT)
- Congressional district: 4th
- Website: www.ashlandcountyoh.us

Ashland County is a county located in the northeastern portion of the U.S. state of Ohio. As of the 2020 census, the population was 52,447. Its county seat and largest city is Ashland. The county is named for "Ashland", the home of Senator Henry Clay near Lexington, Kentucky. It was formed in 1846 from parts of Huron, Lorain, Richland and Wayne Counties.

Ashland County comprises the Ashland, OH Micropolitan Statistical Area, which is also included in the Mansfield-Ashland-Bucyrus, OH Combined Statistical Area.

== History ==
Ashland County was formed on February 24, 1846, from portions of Huron, Lorain, Richland, and Wayne counties. Like the county seat, it was named after Ashland, the Lexington, Kentucky-area home of Henry Clay, a Kentucky senator. Henry Clay was very popular in the area of north-central Ohio due to the role he played in defusing the secession crisis of 1820 and the Nullification crisis of 1833. The region was settled overwhelmingly by migrants from New England and was culturally continuous with early New England. Part of this meant political support for Henry Clay, opposition to slavery and opposition to secession during the aforementioned crises. Similarly, this meant the Whig Party was very popular in the region during that era. The first non-Native American settlers in the area that became Ashland County were a group of families from Windham County, Connecticut. Subsequent migration from 1800 to the mid-1820s came almost exclusively from the regions of rural Massachusetts, New Hampshire and Maine.

== Geography ==
According to the U.S. Census Bureau, the county has a total area of 427 square miles (1,110 km^{2}), of which 423 square miles (1,100 km^{2}) is land and 3.8 square miles (9.8 km^{2}) (0.9%) is water.

=== Adjacent counties ===
- Lorain County (north)
- Medina County (northeast)
- Wayne County (east)
- Holmes County (southeast)
- Knox County (southwest)
- Richland County (west)
- Huron County (northwest)

== Demographics ==
Historical population
Census	Pop.	Note	%±
1850	23,813		—
1860	22,951		−3.6%
1870	21,933		−4.4%
1880	23,883		8.9%
1890	22,223		−7.0%
1900	21,184		−4.7%
1910	22,975		8.5%
1920	24,627		7.2%
1930	26,867		9.1%
1940	29,785		10.9%
1950	33,040		10.9%
1960	38,771		17.3%
1970	43,303		11.7%
1980	46,178		6.6%
1990	47,507		2.9%
2000	52,523		10.6%
2010	53,139		1.2%
2020	52,447		−1.3%
2025 (est.)	52,523	▲	0.1%
U.S. Decennial Census; 1790–1960 1900–90; 1990–2000 2020 2025

=== Racial and ethnic composition ===
Ashland County, Ohio – Racial and ethnic composition Note: the US Census treats Hispanic/Latino as an ethnic category. This table excludes Latinos from the racial categories and assigns them to a separate category. Hispanics/Latinos may be of any race.
Race / Ethnicity (NH = Non-Hispanic)	Pop 1980	Pop 1990	Pop 2000	Pop 2010	Pop 2020	% 1980	% 1990	% 2000	% 2010	% 2020
White alone (NH)	45,422	46,535	51,021	51,352	48,948	98.36%	97.95%	97.14%	96.64%	93.33%
Black or African American alone (NH)	311	456	419	395	383	0.67%	0.96%	0.80%	0.74%	0.73%
Native American or Alaska Native alone (NH)	40	48	51	77	82	0.09%	0.10%	0.10%	0.14%	0.16%
Asian alone (NH)	131	270	286	275	322	0.28%	0.57%	0.54%	0.52%	0.61%
Native Hawaiian or Pacific Islander alone (NH)	x	x	15	39	33	x	x	0.03%	0.07%	0.06%
Other race alone (NH)	85	7	30	23	103	0.18%	0.01%	0.06%	0.04%	0.20%
Mixed race or Multiracial (NH)	x	x	362	477	1,714	x	x	0.69%	0.90%	3.27%
Hispanic or Latino (any race)	189	191	339	501	862	0.41%	0.40%	0.65%	0.94%	1.64%
Total	46,178	47,507	52,523	53,139	52,447	100.00%	100.00%	100.00%	100.00%	100.00%

=== 2020 census ===
As of the 2020 census, the county had a population of 52,447. The median age was 41.5 years. 22.5% of residents were under the age of 18 and 20.4% of residents were 65 years of age or older. For every 100 females there were 96.5 males, and for every 100 females age 18 and over there were 93.9 males age 18 and over.

The racial makeup of the county was 93.9% White, 0.8% Black or African American, 0.2% American Indian and Alaska Native, 0.6% Asian, 0.1% Native Hawaiian and Pacific Islander, 0.5% from some other race, and 3.9% from two or more races. Hispanic or Latino residents of any race comprised 1.6% of the population.

36.6% of residents lived in urban areas, while 63.4% lived in rural areas.

There were 20,700 households in the county, of which 27.4% had children under the age of 18 living in them. Of all households, 51.6% were married-couple households, 17.2% were households with a male householder and no spouse or partner present, and 24.3% were households with a female householder and no spouse or partner present. About 28.3% of all households were made up of individuals and 13.3% had someone living alone who was 65 years of age or older.

There were 22,471 housing units, of which 7.9% were vacant. Among occupied housing units, 74.6% were owner-occupied and 25.4% were renter-occupied. The homeowner vacancy rate was 1.1% and the rental vacancy rate was 5.9%.

=== 2010 census ===
As of the 2010 United States census, there were 53,139 people, 20,196 households, and 14,017 families living in the county. The population density was 125.6 inhabitants per square mile (48.5/km^{2}). There were 22,141 housing units at an average density of 52.3 units per square mile (20.2 units/km^{2}). The racial makeup of the county was 97.3% white, 0.7% black or African American, 0.5% Asian, 0.2% American Indian, 0.1% Pacific islander, 0.2% from other races, and 1.0% from two or more races. Those of Hispanic or Latino origin made up 0.9% of the population. In terms of ancestry, 32.7% were German, 26.2% were English, 11.2% were Irish, and 5.2% were Italian.

Of the 20,196 households, 30.9% had children under the age of 18 living with them, 55.6% were married couples living together, 9.4% had a female householder with no husband present, 30.6% were non-families, and 25.3% of all households were made up of individuals. The average household size was 2.53 and the average family size was 3.02. The median age was 39.3 years.

The median income for a household in the county was $44,542 and the median income for a family was $54,177. Males had a median income of $39,663 versus $31,012 for females. The per capita income for the county was $20,558. About 10.2% of families and 15.6% of the population were below the poverty line, including 26.6% of those under age 18 and 7.9% of those age 65 or over.

=== 2000 census ===
As of the census of 2000, there were 52,523 people, 19,524 households, and 14,018 families living in the county. The population density was 124 inhabitants per square mile (48/km^{2}). There were 20,832 housing units at an average density of 49 units per square mile (19/km^{2}). The racial makeup of the county was 97.54% White, 0.81% Black or African American, 0.11% Native American, 0.55% Asian, 0.03% Pacific Islander, 0.21% from other races, and 0.76% from two or more races. 0.65% of the population were Hispanic or Latino of any race. 36.8% were of German, 27.4% English and 8.8% Irish ancestry according to Census 2000. 96.1% spoke English, 1.2% German and 1.0% Spanish as their first language.

There were 19,524 households, out of which 32.50% had children under the age of 18 living with them, 59.50% were married couples living together, 8.50% had a female householder with no husband present, and 28.20% were non-families. 24.00% of all households were made up of individuals, and 10.30% had someone living alone who was 65 years of age or older. The average household size was 2.58 and the average family size was 3.06.

In the county, the population was spread out, with 25.70% under the age of 18, 10.80% from 18 to 24, 26.50% from 25 to 44, 23.00% from 45 to 64, and 13.90% who were 65 years of age or older. The median age was 36 years. For every 100 females there were 96.60 males. For every 100 females age 18 and over, there were 92.40 males.

The median income for a household in the county was $39,179, and the median income for a family was $46,306. Males had a median income of $32,585 versus $22,334 for females. The per capita income for the county was $17,308. About 7.10% of families and 9.50% of the population were below the poverty line, including 13.10% of those under age 18 and 7.50% of those age 65 or over.

== Politics ==
Prior to 1912, Ashland County was a Democratic Party stronghold in presidential elections voting Republicans only once since 1856. The county was a national bellwether from 1912 to 1936, but starting with the 1940 election, the county has become a Republican Party stronghold. Lyndon B. Johnson's win in 1964 is the lone time since then that a Democrat has won the county.

Seal of the Clerk of Common Pleas Court of Ashland County

United States presidential election results for Ashland County, Ohio
Year	Republican		Democratic		Third party(ies)	
Year	No.	%	No.	%	No.	%
1856	1,912	47.33%	2,089	51.71%	39	0.97%
1860	2,166	49.05%	1,720	38.95%	530	12.00%
1864	2,144	48.46%	2,280	51.54%	0	0.00%
1868	2,205	46.83%	2,504	53.17%	0	0.00%
1872	2,183	47.60%	2,368	51.64%	35	0.76%
1876	2,387	44.09%	3,021	55.80%	6	0.11%
1880	2,752	46.07%	3,217	53.86%	4	0.07%
1884	2,616	43.21%	3,325	54.92%	113	1.87%
1888	2,445	42.32%	3,152	54.56%	180	3.12%
1892	2,256	40.63%	3,042	54.79%	254	4.57%
1896	2,608	42.89%	3,422	56.28%	50	0.82%
1900	2,641	43.15%	3,399	55.53%	81	1.32%
1904	2,747	44.94%	2,996	49.01%	370	6.05%
1908	2,804	42.66%	3,627	55.18%	142	2.16%
1912	1,017	16.16%	3,364	53.45%	1,913	30.39%
1916	2,534	37.94%	4,000	59.89%	145	2.17%
1920	5,951	50.62%	5,705	48.52%	101	0.86%
1924	5,777	52.68%	4,377	39.91%	812	7.40%
1928	8,745	72.29%	3,256	26.92%	96	0.79%
1932	6,549	46.49%	7,302	51.84%	235	1.67%
1936	6,154	40.09%	8,818	57.44%	380	2.48%
1940	8,624	52.40%	7,835	47.60%	0	0.00%
1944	8,994	59.47%	6,130	40.53%	0	0.00%
1948	8,027	56.56%	6,095	42.95%	69	0.49%
1952	12,459	70.38%	5,244	29.62%	0	0.00%
1956	12,792	73.41%	4,634	26.59%	0	0.00%
1960	13,112	69.70%	5,700	30.30%	0	0.00%
1964	7,308	46.25%	8,493	53.75%	0	0.00%
1968	9,745	62.49%	4,526	29.02%	1,323	8.48%
1972	12,470	73.04%	4,302	25.20%	302	1.77%
1976	9,761	56.25%	7,205	41.52%	388	2.24%
1980	11,691	62.56%	5,142	27.51%	1,856	9.93%
1984	14,339	74.40%	4,786	24.83%	147	0.76%
1988	12,726	67.19%	6,072	32.06%	141	0.74%
1992	9,864	47.30%	5,985	28.70%	5,006	24.00%
1996	10,402	52.61%	6,573	33.24%	2,798	14.15%
2000	13,533	63.66%	6,685	31.45%	1,040	4.89%
2004	16,209	64.89%	8,576	34.33%	194	0.78%
2008	15,158	60.19%	9,300	36.93%	727	2.89%
2012	15,519	63.76%	8,281	34.02%	540	2.22%
2016	17,493	70.72%	5,740	23.20%	1,504	6.08%
2020	19,407	73.50%	6,541	24.77%	457	1.73%
2024	19,863	74.31%	6,544	24.48%	323	1.21%

United States Senate election results for Ashland County, Ohio1
Year	Republican		Democratic		Third party(ies)	
Year	No.	%	No.	%	No.	%
2024	17,894	68.32%	7,280	27.79%	1,019	3.89%

== Transportation ==
The Ashland County Airport is located three nautical miles (3.5 mi; 5.6 km) northeast of the central business district of the City of Ashland.

== Park District ==
The Ashland County Park District was founded in 2002. The park district currently consists of 18 parks throughout the county. Monthly bird walks are held at Byers Woods Park (located on 675 County Road 1754, Ashland, OH 44805) on the fourth Saturday of the month. A full list of seasonal events can be found through the park district webpage.

== Communities ==
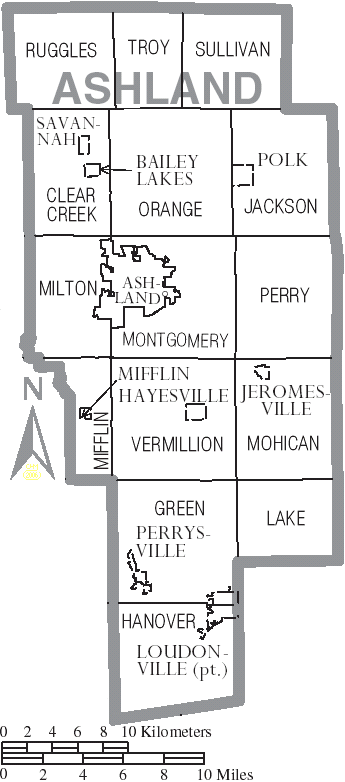
Map of Ashland County, Ohio, with municipal and township labels

=== City ===
- Ashland (county seat)

=== Villages ===
- Bailey Lakes
- Hayesville
- Jeromesville
- Loudonville
- Mifflin
- Perrysville
- Polk
- Savannah

=== Townships ===
- Clear Creek
- Green
- Hanover
- Jackson
- Lake
- Mifflin
- Milton
- Mohican
- Montgomery
- Orange
- Perry
- Ruggles
- Sullivan
- Troy
- Vermillion

=== Census-designated places ===
- Cinnamon Lake
- Nankin
- Sullivan

=== Unincorporated communities ===
- Albion
- Mohicanville
- Nova
- Paradise Hill
- Redhaw
- Rowsburg
- Ruggles
- Widowville

== See also ==
- National Register of Historic Places listings in Ashland County, Ohio
