= Ohio State Route 162 =

East-west state highway in Ohio, US

State Route 162

Route information
- Maintained by ODOT
- Length: 83.32 mi (134.09 km)
- Existed: 1924–present

Major junctions
- West end: SR 18 / SR 67 in Republic
- US 250 / SR 13 in Fitchville; US 42 in Lafayette Township; I-77 in Akron
- East end: SR 18 in Akron

Location
- Country: United States
- State: Ohio
- Counties: Seneca, Huron, Lorain, Medina, Summit

Highway system
- Ohio State Highway System; Interstate; US; State; Scenic
← SR 161	→ SR 163

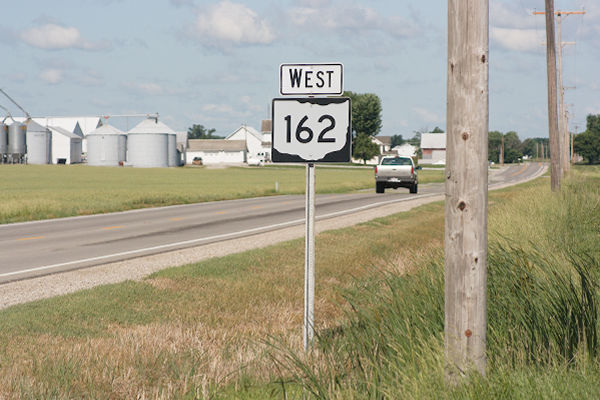
State Route 162 5 miles (8.0 km) east of Republic

State Route 162 (SR 162) is an east–west state highway in the north central and northeastern parts of the U.S. state of Ohio. Its western terminus is in Republic at SR 18 and SR 67 and its eastern terminus is in Akron at SR 18 (the intersection of Rand and Market Street) though signage along Market Street east of here shows it ending at High Street (SR 261 westbound).

== Major intersections ==
County	Location	mi	km	Destinations	Notes
Seneca	Republic	0.00	0.00	SR 18 (West Jefferson Street) / SR 67 (Kilbourne Street) – Upper Sandusky, Tiffin	
Seneca	Republic	0.07	0.11	SR 19 (Madison Street) – Bloomville, Green Springs, Bellevue	
Seneca	Reed Township	8.21	13.21	SR 4 – Attica, Sandusky	
Huron	Greenfield Township	16.70	26.88	SR 99 – Willard, Monroeville	
Huron	Greenfield Township	19.77	31.82	SR 61 – New Haven, Norwalk	
Huron	Fitchville Township	28.51	45.88	US 250 west / SR 13 north – Norwalk	Western end of US 250 / SR 13 concurrencies
Huron	Fitchville Township	29.15	46.91	SR 13 south / CR 60 (Fitchville River Road) – Mansfield	Eastern end of SR 13 concurrency
Huron	Fitchville Township	29.49	47.46	US 250 east	Eastern end of US 250 concurrency
Huron	New London	33.85	54.48	SR 60 (Main Street)	
Lorain	Rochester Township	40.32	64.89	SR 511 – Nova, Rochester	
Lorain	Huntington Township	44.72	71.97	SR 58 – Sullivan, Wellington	
Medina	Spencer	49.80	80.15	SR 301 (Main Street)	
Medina	Chatham Township	54.96	88.45	SR 83 – Lodi, Litchfield	
Medina	Lafayette Township	59.75	96.16	US 42 north (Lafayette Road) – Medina	Western end of US 42 concurrency
Medina	Lafayette Township	60.22	96.91	US 42 south (Lafayette Road) – Ashland	Eastern end of US 42 concurrency
Medina	Montville Township	63.94	102.90	SR 3 south (Wooster Pike) – Wooster	Western end of SR 3 concurrency
Medina	Montville Township	64.43	103.69	SR 3 north (Wooster Pike)	Eastern end of SR 3 concurrency
Medina	Montville Township	65.85	105.98	SR 57 (Wadsworth Road) – Medina, Rittman	
Medina	Sharon Township	71.40– 71.48	114.91– 115.04	SR 94 – Hinckley, Wadsworth	Traffic circle
Summit	Copley Township	75.71– 75.76	121.84– 121.92	SR 21 – Massillion, Cleveland	Diamond interchange
Summit	Akron	80.12– 80.24	128.94– 129.13	I-77 / St. Michaels Avenue – Canton, Cleveland	Exit 131 (I-77)
Summit	Akron	83.32	134.09	SR 18 (Market Street)	
1.000 mi = 1.609 km; 1.000 km = 0.621 mi: Concurrency terminus
