= Spencer Township, Medina County, Ohio =

Township in Ohio, US

- Township
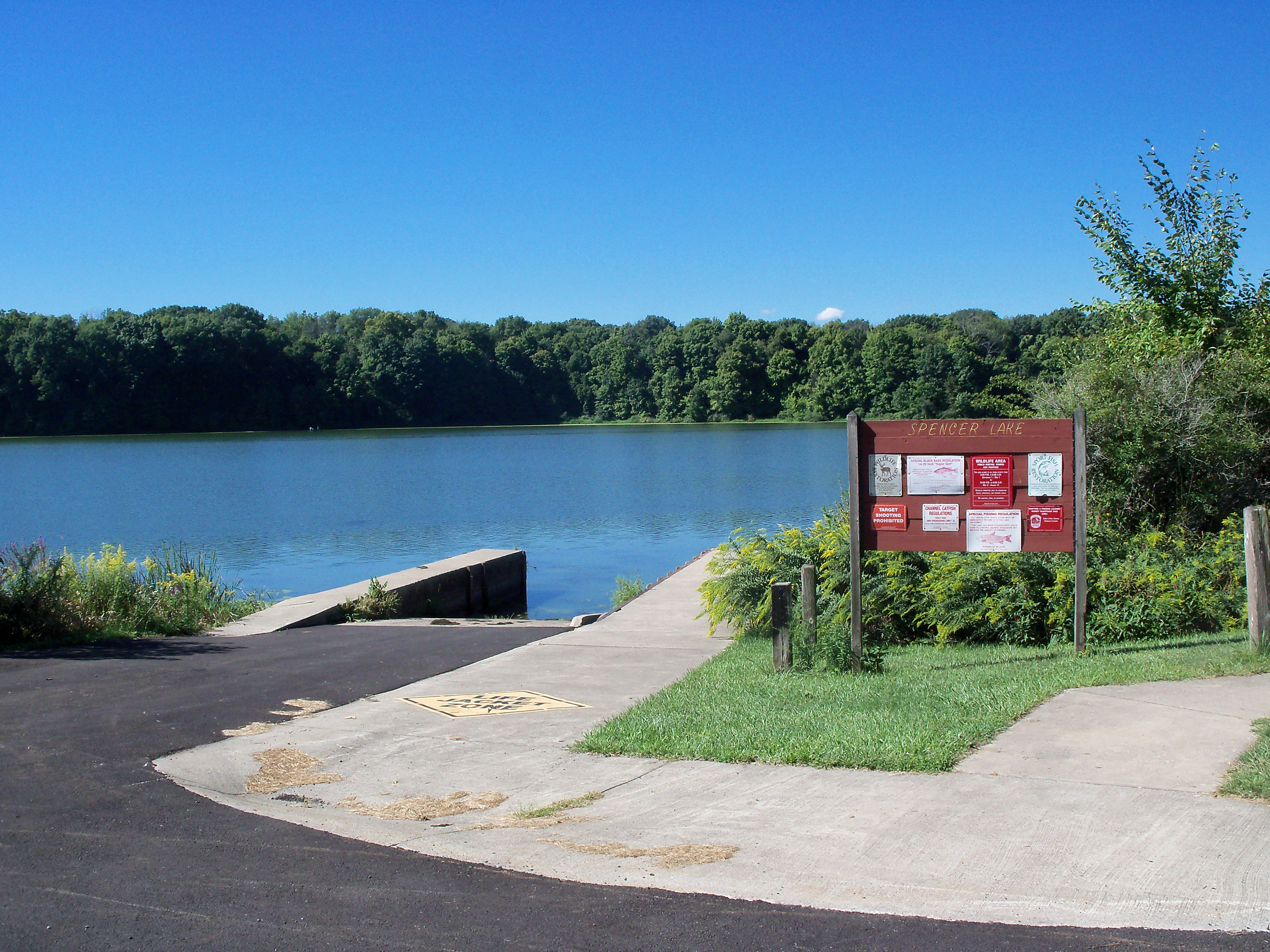
- Spencer Lake is located in Spencer Township

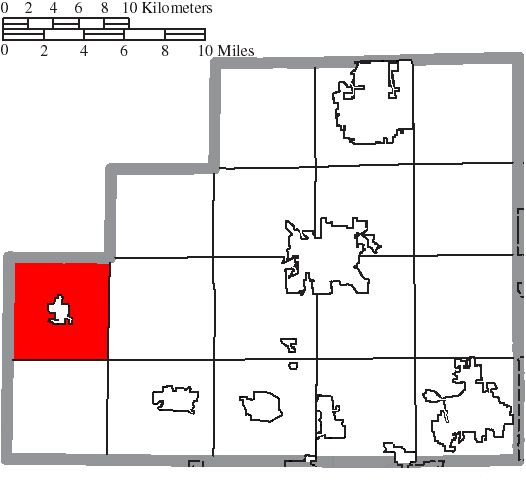
- Location of Spencer Township in Medina County
- Coordinates: 41°5′58″N 82°7′17″W
- Country: United States
- State: Ohio
- County: Medina

Area
  - Total: 25.2 sq mi (65.3 km^{2})
  - Land: 25.1 sq mi (65.0 km^{2})
  - Water: 0.15 sq mi (0.4 km^{2})
- Elevation: 928 ft (283 m)

Population (2020)
  - Total: 1,812
  - Density: 72.2/sq mi (27.9/km^{2})
- Time zone: UTC-5 (Eastern (EST))
  - Summer (DST): UTC-4 (EDT)
- ZIP code: 44275
- Area code: 330
- FIPS code: 39-73999
- GNIS feature ID: 1086604
- Website: https://spencertownshipmedinacountyohio.com/

Spencer Township is one of the seventeen townships of Medina County, Ohio, United States. The 2020 census found 1,812 people in the township.

== Geography ==
Located in the west part of the county, it borders the following townships:

- Penfield Township, Lorain County - north
- Litchfield Township - northeast corner
- Chatham Township - east
- Harrisville Township - southeast corner
- Homer Township - south
- Sullivan Township, Ashland County - southwest corner
- Huntington Township, Lorain County - west
- Wellington Township, Lorain County - northwest corner

The village of Spencer is located in central Spencer Township. The Spencer Lake Wildlife Area is a 618-acre public hunting and fishing park featuring wetlands and a dog training area surrounding an artificial lake constructed in 1961, and rebuilt and enlarged in 1986. The park lies two miles east of the village of Spencer.

== Name and history ==
Spencer Township has the name of Calvin Spencer, who helped build a school in exchange for the naming rights. Statewide, other Spencer Townships are located in Allen, Guernsey, and Lucas counties and formerly in Hamilton County.

== Government ==
The township is governed by a three-member board of trustees, who are elected in November of odd-numbered years to a four-year term beginning on the following January 1. Two are elected in the year after the presidential election and one is elected in the year before it. There is also an elected township fiscal officer, who serves a four-year term beginning on April 1 of the year after the election, which is held in November of the year before the presidential election. Vacancies in the fiscal officership or on the board of trustees are filled by the remaining trustees.
