= Penfield Township, Lorain County, Ohio =

Township in Ohio, US

- Township
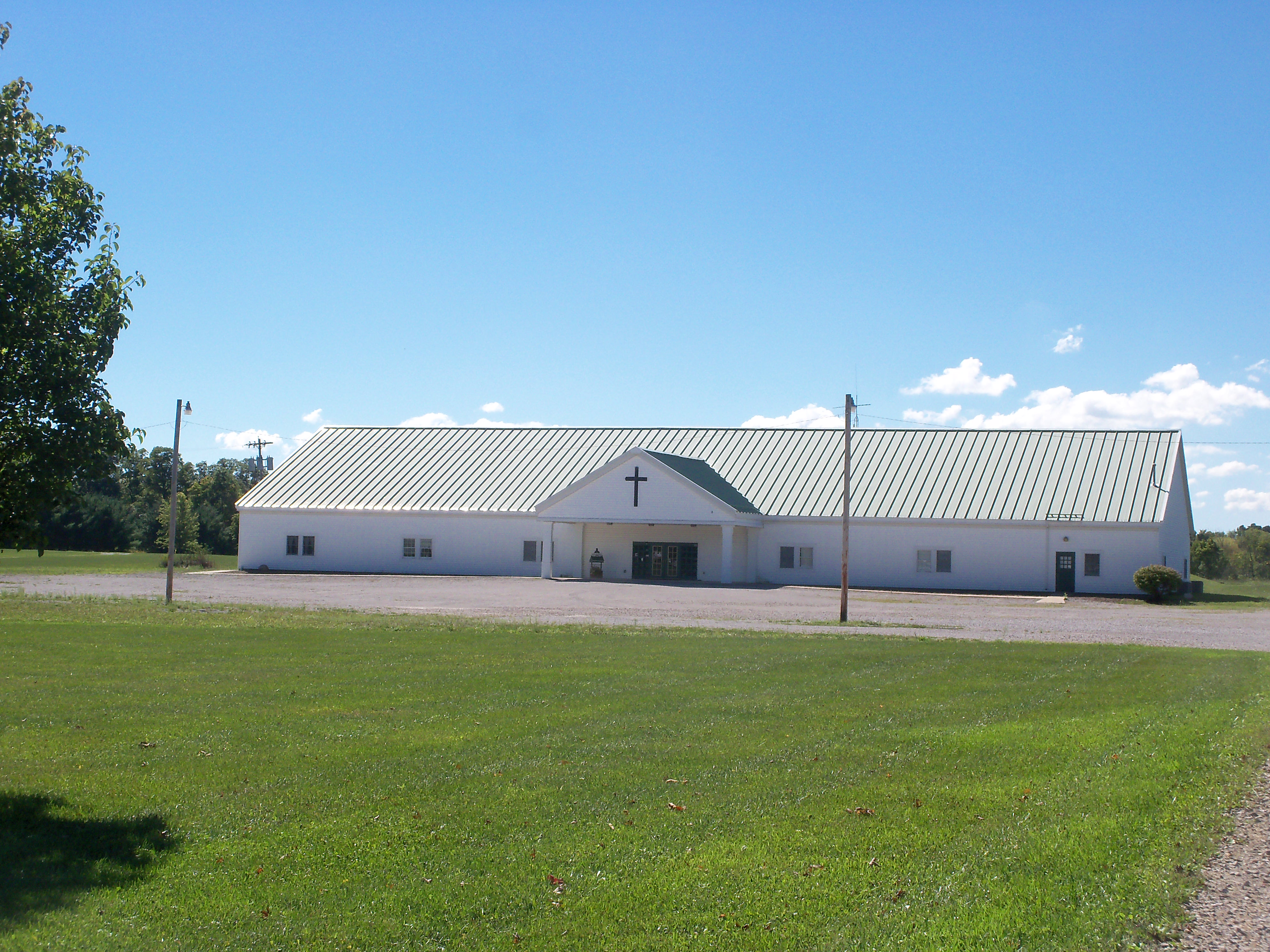
- Penfield Community Church on Route 18

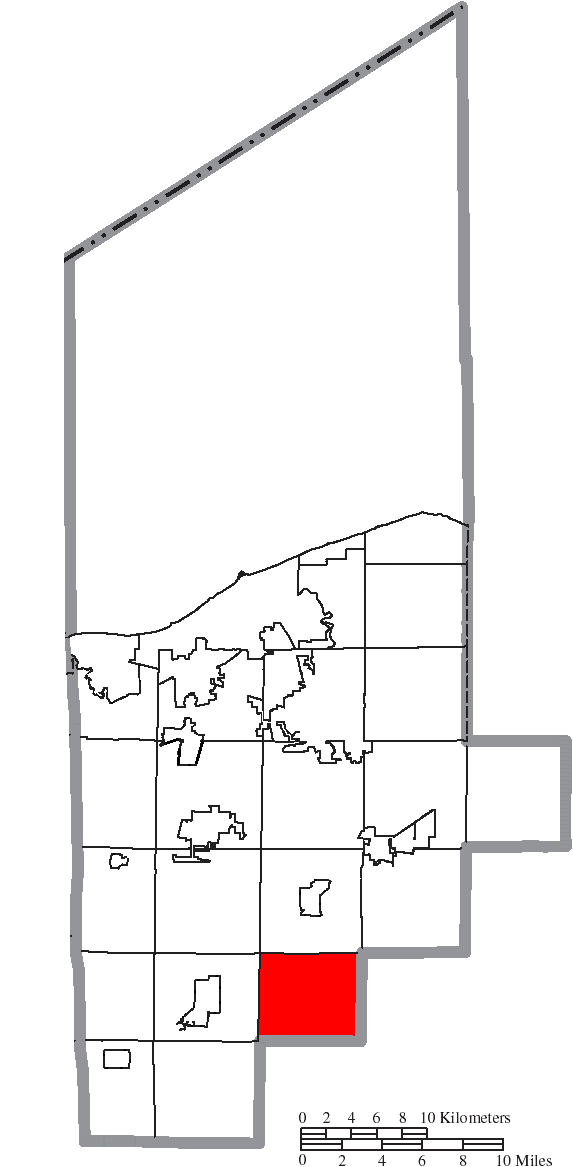
- Location of Penfield Township in Lorain County
- Coordinates: 41°10′19″N 82°6′32″W
- Country: United States
- State: Ohio
- County: Lorain

Area
  - Total: 21.75 sq mi (56.33 km^{2})
  - Land: 21.62 sq mi (55.99 km^{2})
  - Water: 0.14 sq mi (0.35 km^{2})
- Elevation: 843 ft (257 m)

Population (2020)
  - Total: 1,835
  - Density: 84.88/sq mi (32.77/km^{2})
- Time zone: UTC-5 (Eastern (EST))
  - Summer (DST): UTC-4 (EDT)
- FIPS code: 39-61532
- GNIS feature ID: 1086516
- Website: www.penfieldtownship.com

Penfield Township is one of the eighteen townships of Lorain County, Ohio, United States. As of the 2020 census the population was 1,835.

== Geography ==
Located in southeastern Lorain County, it borders the following townships:

- LaGrange Township - north
- Grafton Township - northeast corner
- Litchfield Township, Medina County - east
- Chatham Township, Medina County - southeast corner
- Spencer Township, Medina County - south
- Huntington Township - southwest corner
- Wellington Township - west
- Pittsfield Township - northwest corner

No municipalities are located in Penfield Township.

== Name and history ==
Penfield Township was established in 1820 and named in honor of Peter Penfield, an early settler. It is the only Penfield Township statewide.

== Government ==
The township is governed by a three-member board of trustees, who are elected in November of odd-numbered years to a four-year term beginning on the following January 1. Two are elected in the year after the presidential election and one is elected in the year before it. There is also an elected township fiscal officer, who serves a four-year term beginning on April 1 of the year after the election, which is held in November of the year before the presidential election. Vacancies in the fiscal officership or on the board of trustees are filled by the remaining trustees.
