= Wellington Township, Lorain County, Ohio =

Township in Ohio, US

- Township
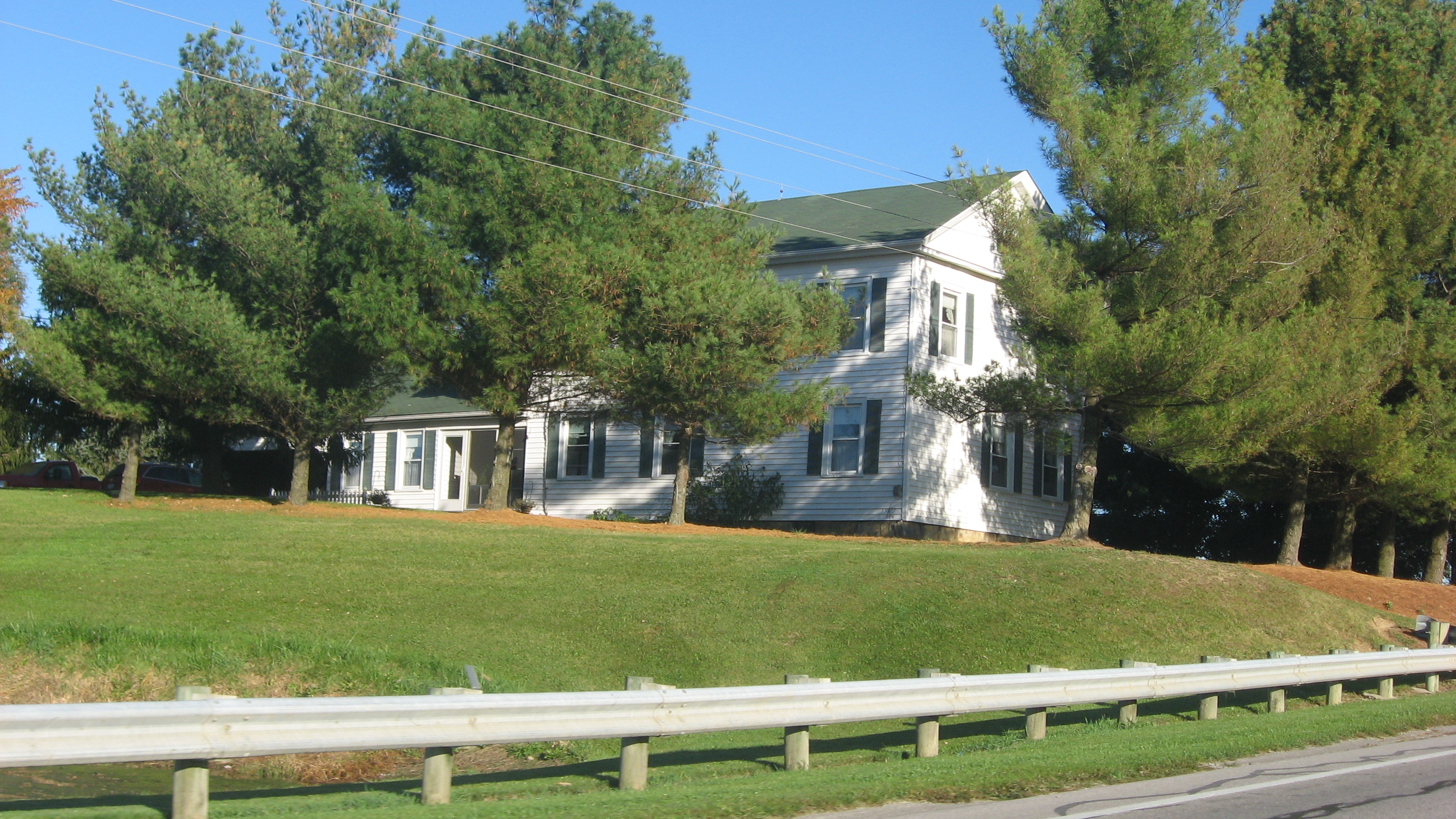
- The Sprague House south of Wellington

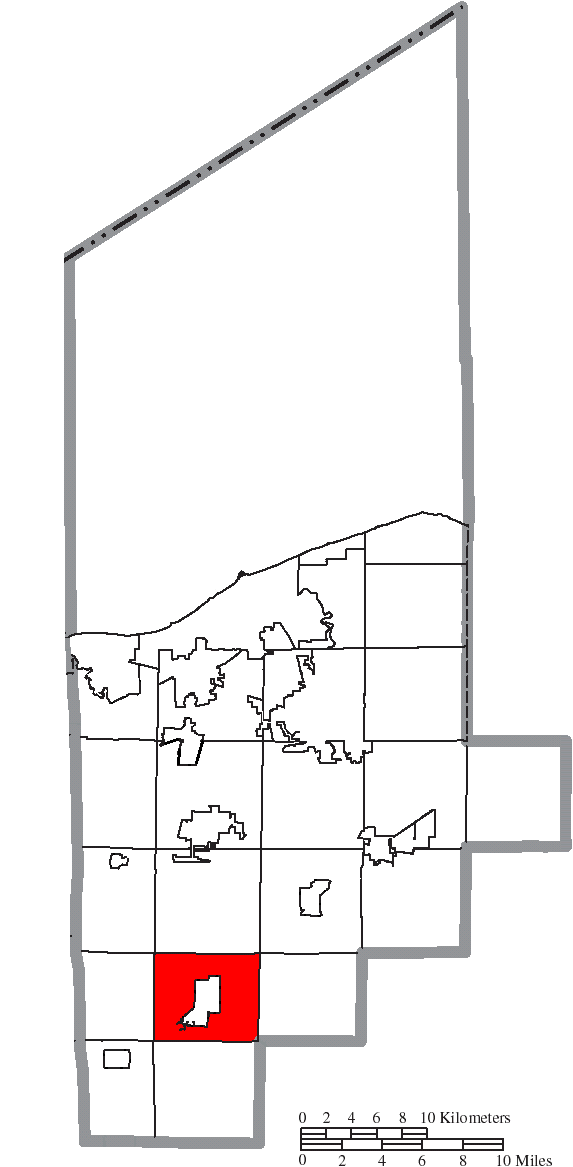
- Location of Wellington Township in Lorain County
- Coordinates: 41°10′N 82°13′W
- Country: United States
- State: Ohio
- County: Lorain

Area
  - Total: 22.54 sq mi (58.37 km^{2})
  - Land: 22.14 sq mi (57.35 km^{2})
  - Water: 0.40 sq mi (1.03 km^{2})
- Elevation: 846 ft (258 m)

Population (2020)
  - Total: 6,140
  - Density: 277/sq mi (107/km^{2})
- Time zone: UTC-5 (Eastern (EST))
  - Summer (DST): UTC-4 (EDT)
- ZIP code: 44090
- Area code: 440
- FIPS code: 39-82656
- GNIS feature ID: 1086523
- Website: www.wellingtontownshipohio.gov

Wellington Township is one of the eighteen townships of Lorain County, Ohio, United States. As of the 2020 census the population was 6,140.

== Geography ==
Located in southern Lorain County, it borders the following townships:

- Pittsfield Township - north
- LaGrange Township - northeast corner
- Penfield Township - east
- Spencer Township, Medina County - southeast corner
- Huntington Township - south
- Rochester Township - southwest corner
- Brighton Township - west
- Camden Township - northwest corner

The village of Wellington is located in central Wellington Township.

== Name and history ==
It is the only Wellington Township statewide.

== Government ==
The township is governed by a three-member board of trustees, who are elected in November of odd-numbered years to a four-year term beginning on the following January 1. Two are elected in the year after the presidential election and one is elected in the year before it. There is also an elected township fiscal officer, who serves a four-year term beginning on April 1 of the year after the election, which is held in November of the year before the presidential election. Vacancies in the fiscal officer ship or on the board of trustees are filled by the remaining trustees.
