= Pheasant Run, Ohio =

- Census-designated place
- Location within Ohio Location within the United States
- Coordinates: 41°12′26″N 82°08′53″W
- Country: United States
- State: Ohio
- County: Lorain
- Township: LaGrange

Area
  - Total: 0.97 sq mi (2.51 km^{2})
  - Land: 0.93 sq mi (2.42 km^{2})
  - Water: 0.035 sq mi (0.09 km^{2})
- Elevation: 833 ft (254 m)

Population (2020)
  - Total: 1,362
  - Density: 1,458.8/sq mi (563.26/km^{2})
- Time zone: UTC-5 (Eastern (EST))
  - Summer (DST): UTC-4 (EDT)
- Area code: 440
- GNIS feature ID: 2633217

Pheasant Run is an unincorporated community and census-designated place in Lorain County, Ohio, United States. Its population was 1,362 as of the 2020 census.

== Geography ==
According to the U.S. Census Bureau, the community has an area of 0.970 square miles (2.51 km^{2}); 0.934 square miles (2.42 km^{2}) of its area is land, and 0.036 square miles (0.093 km^{2}) is water.

== Demographics ==
Historical population
| Census | Pop. | Note | %± |
|---|---|---|---|
| 2020 | 1,362 | | — |
U.S. Decennial Census
