= Harrisville Township, Medina County, Ohio =

Township in Ohio, US

- Township
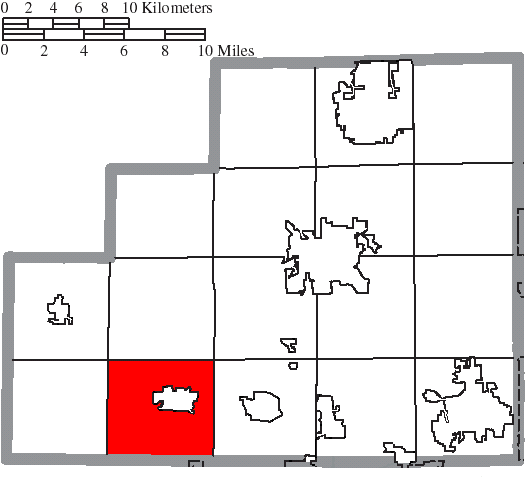
- Location of Harrisville Township in Medina County
- Coordinates: 41°1′49″N 82°1′13″W
- Country: United States
- State: Ohio
- County: Medina

Area
  - Total: 26.3 sq mi (68.0 km^{2})
  - Land: 26.3 sq mi (68.0 km^{2})
  - Water: 0.039 sq mi (0.1 km^{2})
- Elevation: 915 ft (279 m)

Population (2020)
  - Total: 1,717
  - Density: 65.4/sq mi (25.2/km^{2})
- Time zone: UTC-5 (Eastern (EST))
  - Summer (DST): UTC-4 (EDT)
- FIPS code: 39-34104
- GNIS feature ID: 1086594
- Website: https://harrisvilletwpohio.org/

Harrisville Township is one of the seventeen townships of Medina County, Ohio, United States. The 2020 census found 1,717 people in the township.

== Geography ==
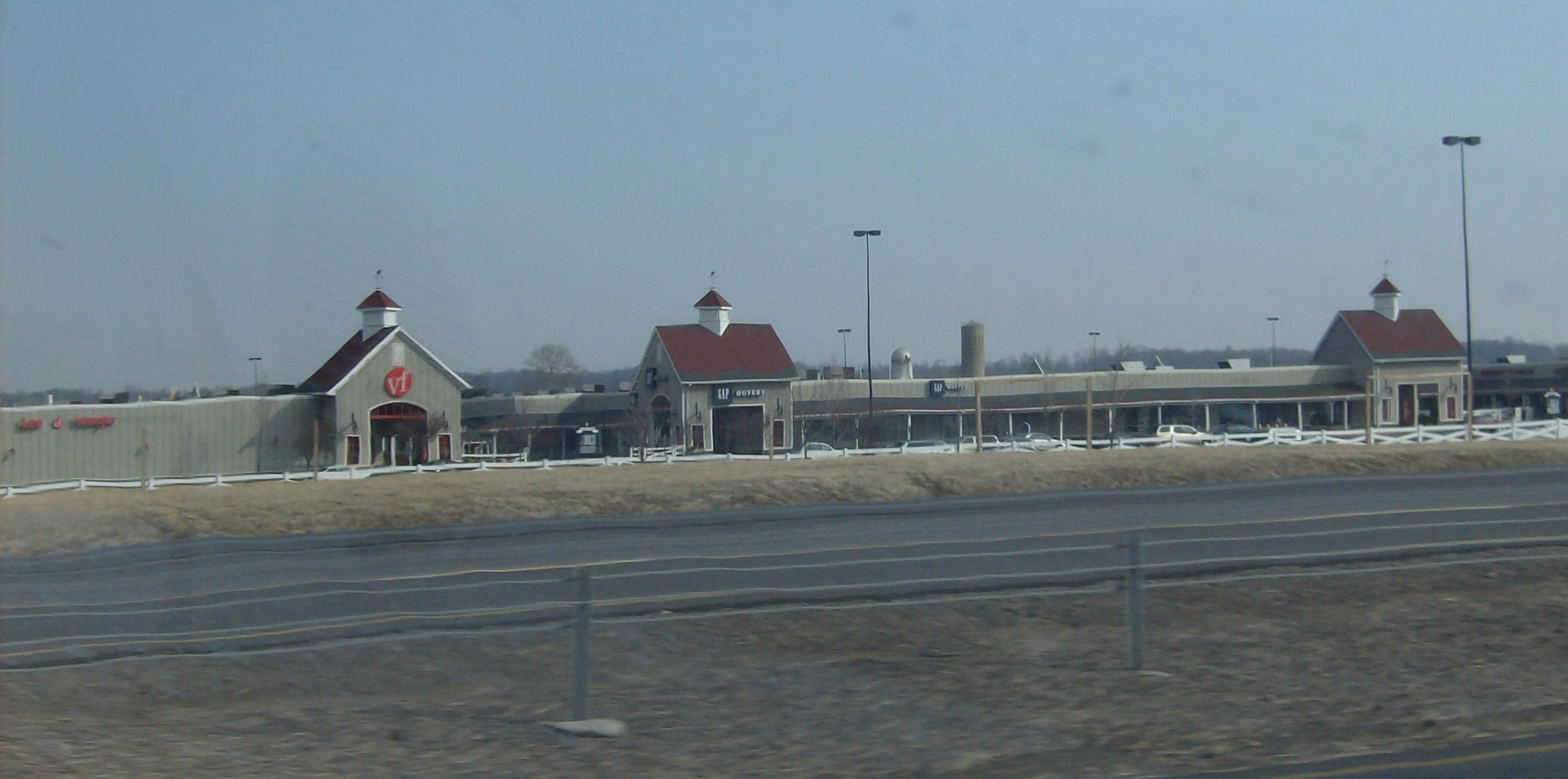
Within Harrisville Township is located the large Lodi Prime Outlets mall.

Located in the southwest part of the county, it borders the following townships:

- Chatham Township - north
- Lafayette Township - northeast corner
- Westfield Township - east
- Canaan Township, Wayne County - southeast
- Congress Township, Wayne County - south
- Homer Township - west
- Spencer Township - northwest corner

The village of Lodi is located in central Harrisville Township.

== Name and history ==
It is the only Harrisville Township statewide.

== Government ==
The township is governed by a three-member board of trustees, who are elected in November of odd-numbered years to a four-year term beginning on the following January 1. Two are elected in the year after the presidential election and one is elected in the year before it. There is also an elected township fiscal officer, who serves a four-year term beginning on April 1 of the year after the election, which is held in November of the year before the presidential election. Vacancies in the fiscal officership or on the board of trustees are filled by the remaining trustees.
