= Grafton Township, Lorain County, Ohio =

Township in Ohio, US

- Township
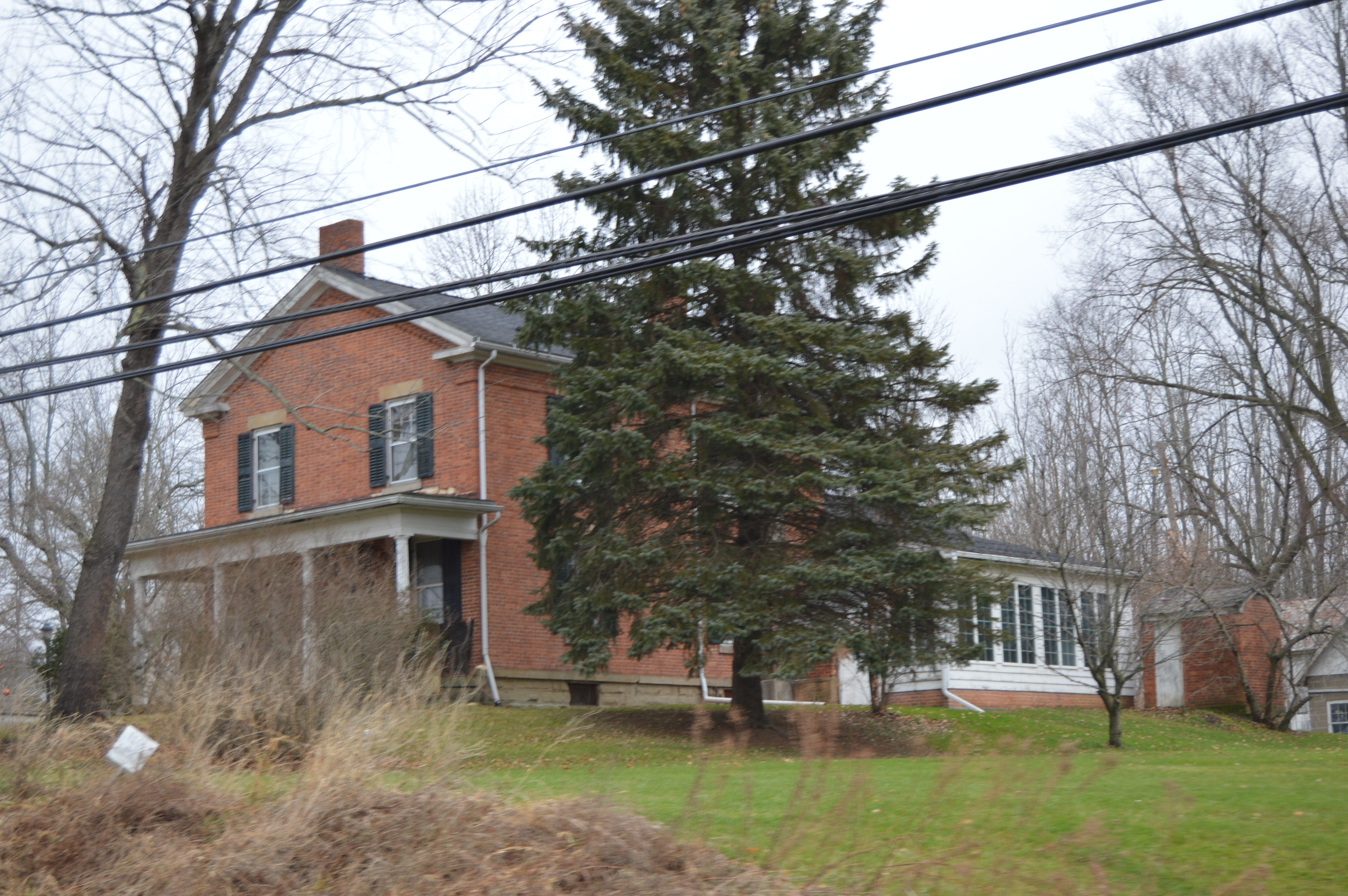
- Justin Breckenridge House, built 1851

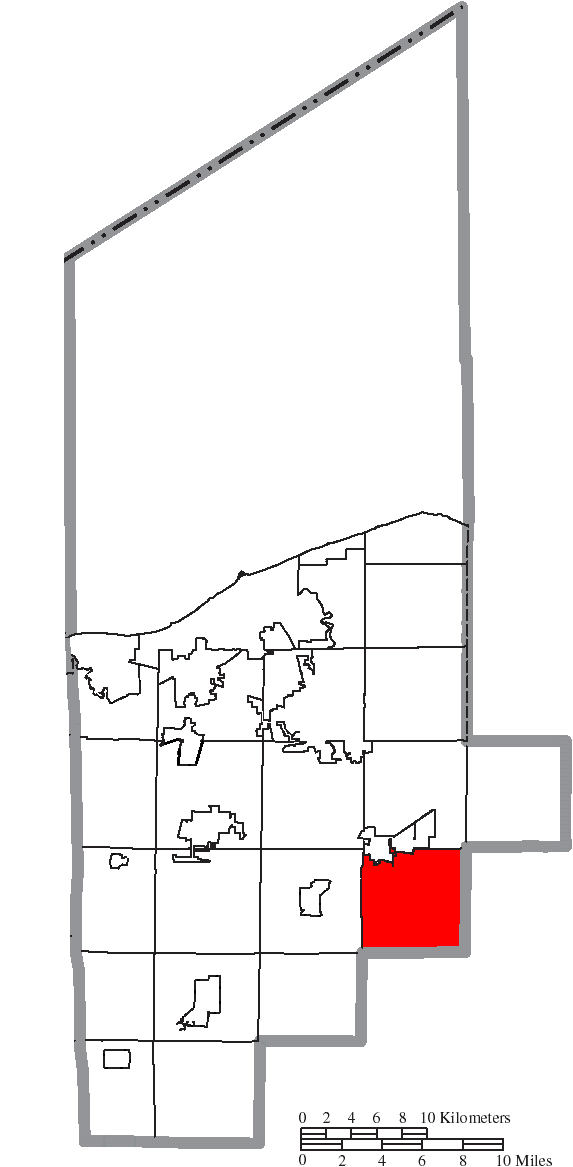
- Location of Grafton Township in Lorain County
- Coordinates: 41°14′19″N 82°2′7″W
- Country: United States
- State: Ohio
- County: Lorain

Area
  - Total: 25.29 sq mi (65.49 km^{2})
  - Land: 25.20 sq mi (65.27 km^{2})
  - Water: 0.085 sq mi (0.22 km^{2})
- Elevation: 837 ft (255 m)

Population (2020)
  - Total: 2,789
  - Density: 110.7/sq mi (42.73/km^{2})
- Time zone: UTC-5 (Eastern (EST))
  - Summer (DST): UTC-4 (EDT)
- ZIP code: 44044
- Area code: 440
- FIPS code: 39-31164
- GNIS feature ID: 1086510
- Website: graftontwp.us

Grafton Township is one of the eighteen townships of Lorain County, Ohio, United States. As of the 2020 census the population was 2,789.

== Geography ==
Located in southeastern Lorain County, it borders the following townships and village:

- Grafton - north
- Eaton Township - northeast
- Columbia Township - northeast corner
- Liverpool Township, Medina County - east
- York Township, Medina County - southeast corner
- Litchfield Township, Medina County - south
- Penfield Township - southwest corner
- LaGrange Township - west

== Name and history ==
It is the only Grafton Township statewide.

== Government ==
The township is governed by a three-member board of trustees, who are elected in November of odd-numbered years to a four-year term beginning on the following January 1. Two are elected in the year after the presidential election and one is elected in the year before it. There is also an elected township fiscal officer, who serves a four-year term beginning on April 1 of the year after the election, which is held in November of the year before the presidential election. Vacancies in the fiscal officership or on the board of trustees are filled by the remaining trustees.
