= Brighton Township, Ohio =

Township in Ohio, US

Brighton Township, Lorain County, Ohio
- Township
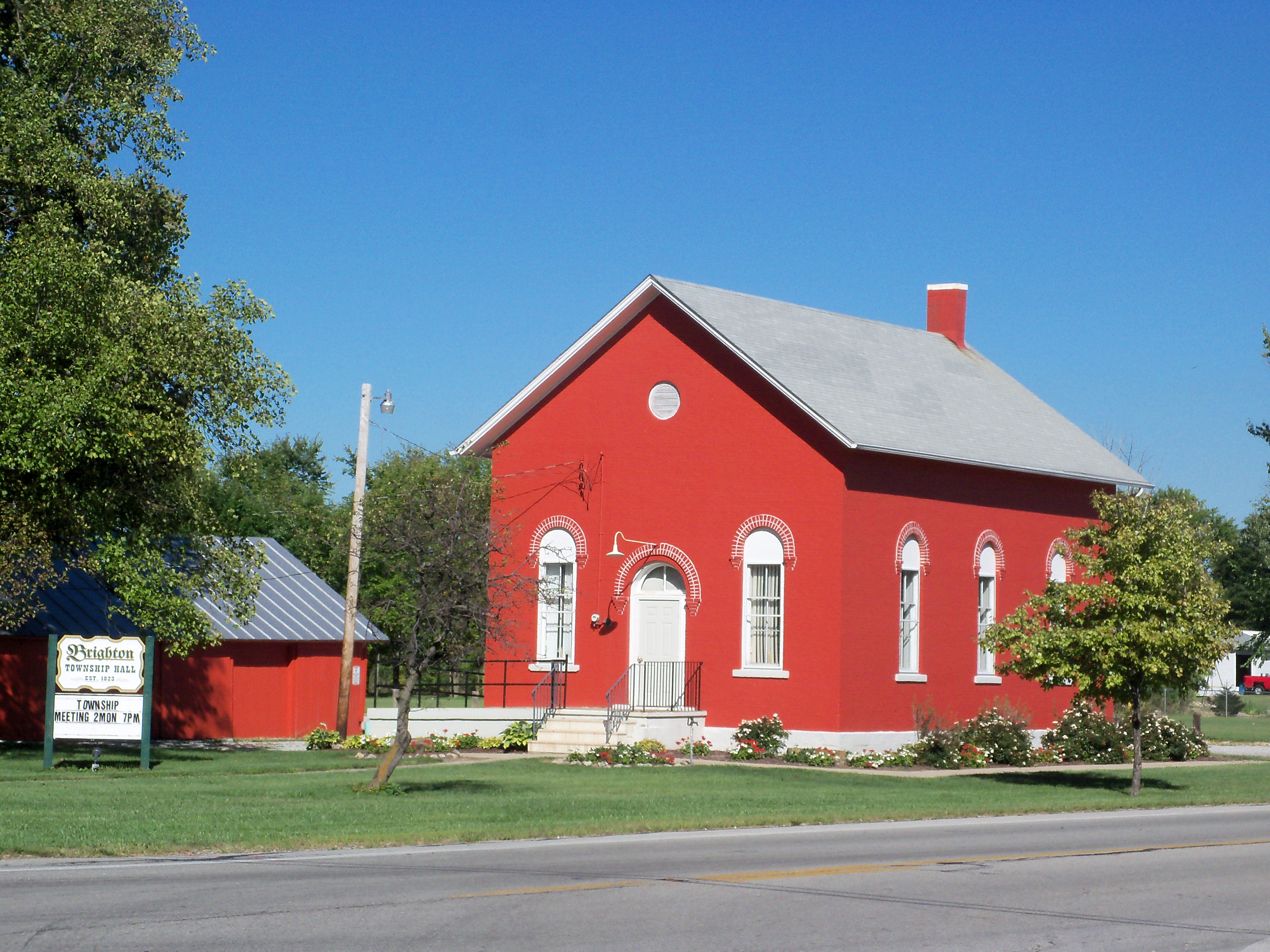
- Township hall at Brighton Center

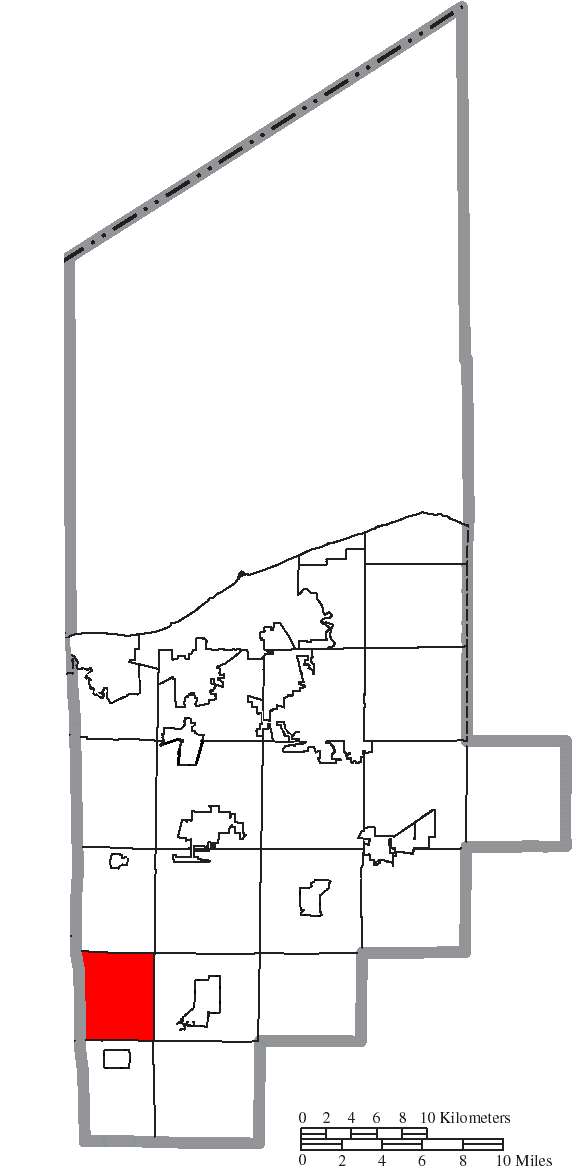
- Location of Brighton Township in Lorain County
- Coordinates: 41°10′7″N 82°18′12″W
- Country: United States
- State: Ohio
- County: Lorain

Area
  - Total: 16.51 sq mi (42.77 km^{2})
  - Land: 16.47 sq mi (42.65 km^{2})
  - Water: 0.046 sq mi (0.12 km^{2})
- Elevation: 892 ft (272 m)

Population (2020)
  - Total: 855
  - Density: 51.9/sq mi (20.0/km^{2})
- Time zone: UTC-5 (Eastern (EST))
  - Summer (DST): UTC-4 (EDT)
- FIPS code: 39-08770
- GNIS feature ID: 1086502
- Website: www.brightontownshipohio.us

Brighton Township is one of the eighteen townships of Lorain County, Ohio, United States. As of the 2020 census, the population was 855.

== Geography ==
Located in southwestern Lorain County, it borders the following townships:

- Camden Township - north
- Pittsfield Township - northeast corner
- Wellington Township - east
- Huntington Township - southeast corner
- Rochester Township - south
- New London Township, Huron County - southwest corner
- Clarksfield Township, Huron County - west

No municipalities are located in Brighton Township.

== Name and history ==
It is the only Brighton Township statewide, named after the city of Brighton in England.

== Government ==
The township is governed by a three-member board of trustees, who are elected in November of odd-numbered years to a four-year term beginning on the following January 1. Two are elected in the year after the presidential election and one is elected in the year before it. There is also an elected township fiscal officer, who serves a four-year term beginning on April 1 of the year after the election, which is held in November of the year before the presidential election. Vacancies in the fiscal officership or on the board of trustees are filled by the remaining trustees.
