= Litchfield, Ohio =

- Unincorporated community
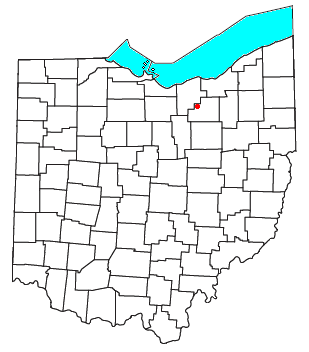
- Location of Litchfield, Ohio
- Coordinates: 41°10′04″N 82°01′23″W
- Country: United States
- State: Ohio
- County: Medina
- Township: Litchfield
- Established: 1831
- Elevation: 1,004 ft (306 m)
- Time zone: UTC-5 (Eastern (EST))
  - Summer (DST): UTC-4 (EDT)
- ZIP codes: 44253
- GNIS feature ID: 1065007
- Website: http://litchfieldtownship.com/

Litchfield is an unincorporated community in central Litchfield Township, Medina County, Ohio, United States. It is situated at the junction of State Routes 83 and 18, about nine miles northwest of the city of Medina.

A post office called Litchfield has been in operation since 1832. The community takes its name from Litchfield Township.

This town is part of the Buckeye Local School District, along with Liverpool Township and York Township.

== Notable people ==
- Oviatt Cole, Ohio State Auditor.
- Josephine Sophia White Griffing, reformer.
- Herman Gould Nickerson, American pioneer
