= Sullivan Township, Ashland County, Ohio =

Township in Ohio, US

- Township
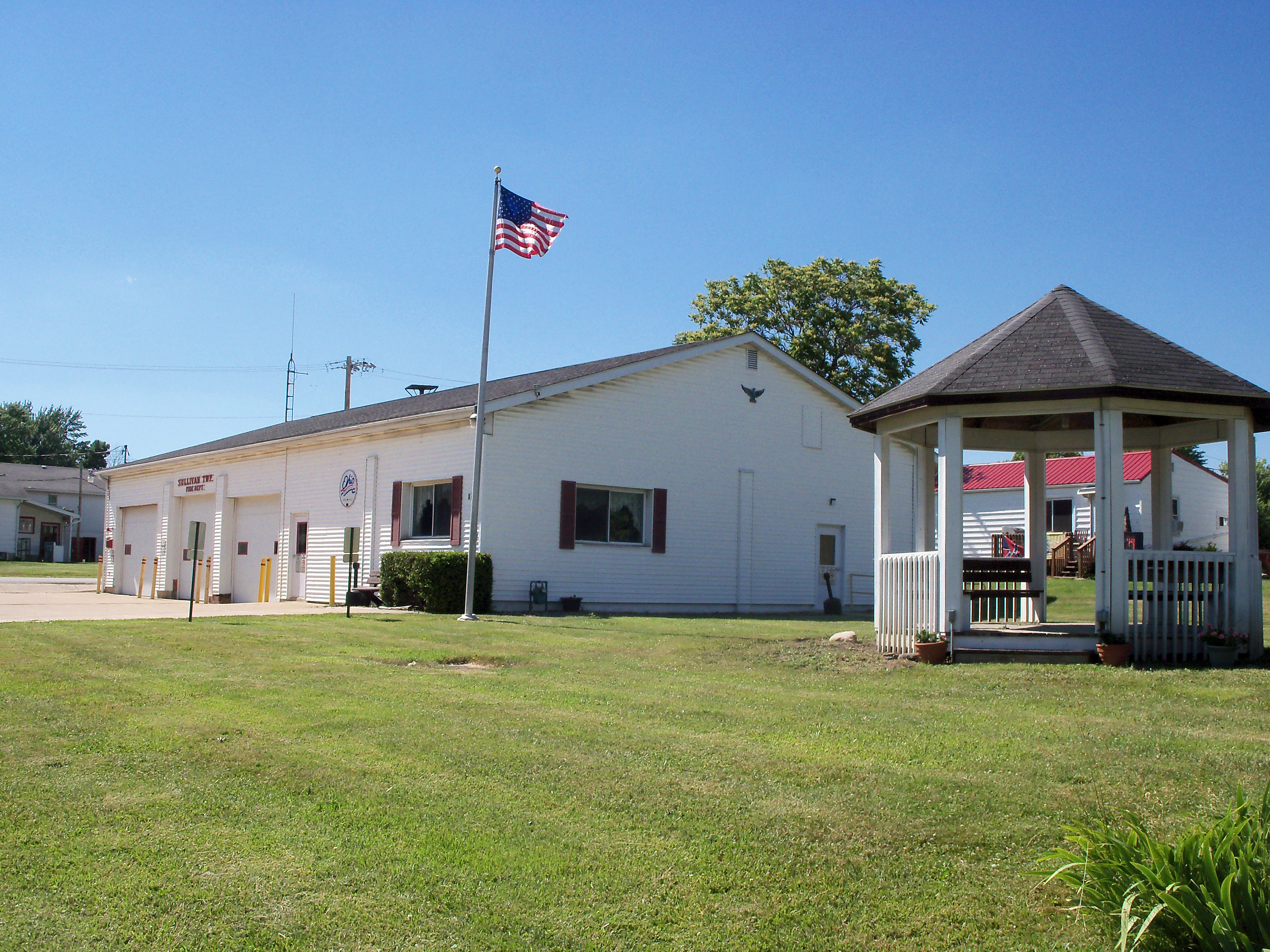
- Township Hall and fire department in Sullivan

- Logo

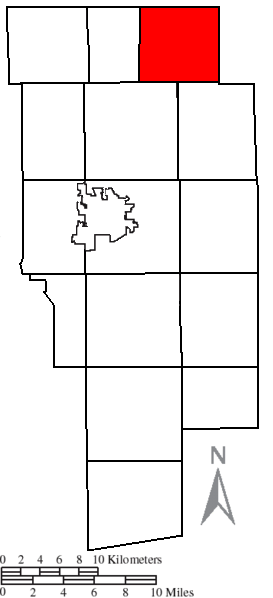
- Location of Sullivan Township in Ashland County
- Coordinates: 41°1′46″N 82°13′21″W
- Country: United States
- State: Ohio
- County: Ashland

Area
  - Total: 25.6 sq mi (66.2 km^{2})
  - Land: 25.4 sq mi (65.8 km^{2})
  - Water: 0.15 sq mi (0.4 km^{2})
- Elevation: 1,135 ft (346 m)

Population (2020)
  - Total: 2,620
  - Density: 99/sq mi (38.2/km^{2})
- Time zone: UTC-5 (Eastern (EST))
  - Summer (DST): UTC-4 (EDT)
- ZIP code: 44880
- Area code: 419
- FIPS code: 39-75357
- GNIS feature ID: 1085715
- Website: www.sullivantwp.us

Historical population
Census	Pop.	Note	%±
1990	1,491		—
2000	2,076		39.2%
2010	2,513		21.1%
2020	2,620		4.3%
2024 (est.)	2,735		4.4%
U.S. Census:

Sullivan Township is one of the fifteen townships of Ashland County, Ohio, United States. The population was 2,620 at the 2020 census.

== Geography ==
Located in the northeastern corner of the county, it borders the following townships:

- Huntington Township, Lorain County – north
- Spencer Township, Medina County – northeast corner
- Homer Township, Medina County – east
- Jackson Township – southeast
- Orange Township – southwest
- Troy Township – west
- Rochester Township, Lorain County – northwest corner

No municipalities are located in Sullivan Township, although the unincorporated community of Sullivan is located in the center of the township.

== Name and history ==
Sullivan Township was organized in 1819 as part of Medina County, and then became part of Lorain County in December 1822. It was added to Ashland County when it was formed on February 24, 1846 from portions of Huron, Lorain, Richland, and Wayne counties.

It is the only Sullivan Township statewide.

== Government ==
The township is governed by a three-member board of trustees, who are elected in November of odd-numbered years to a four-year term beginning on the following January 1. Two are elected in the year after the presidential election and one is elected in the year before it. There is also an elected township fiscal officer, who serves a four-year term beginning on April 1 of the year after the election, which is held in November of the year before the presidential election. Vacancies in the fiscal officership or on the board of trustees are filled by the remaining trustees.
