= Pittsfield Township, Lorain County, Ohio =

Township in Ohio, US

- Township
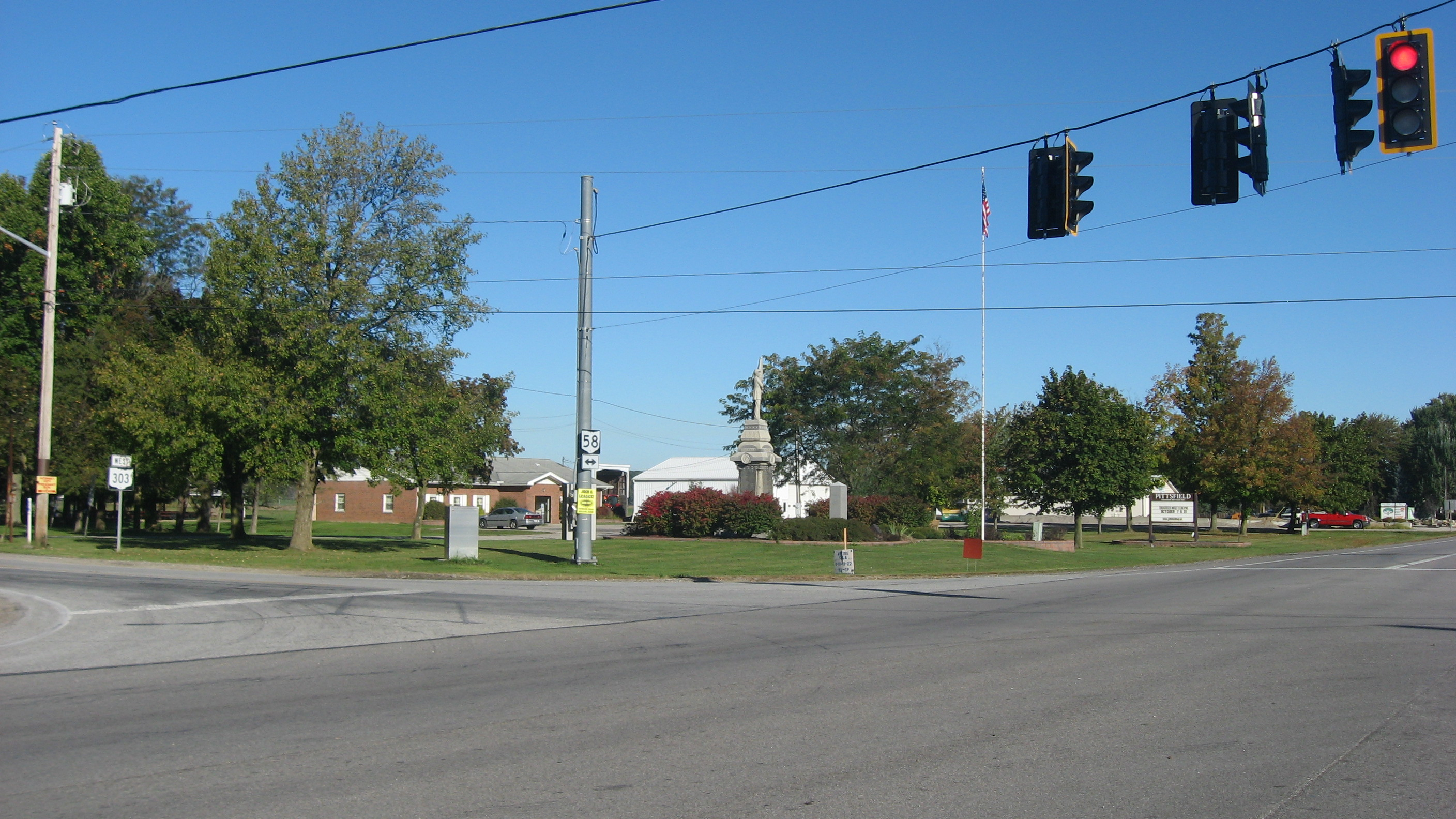
- Main intersection at Pittsfield Center

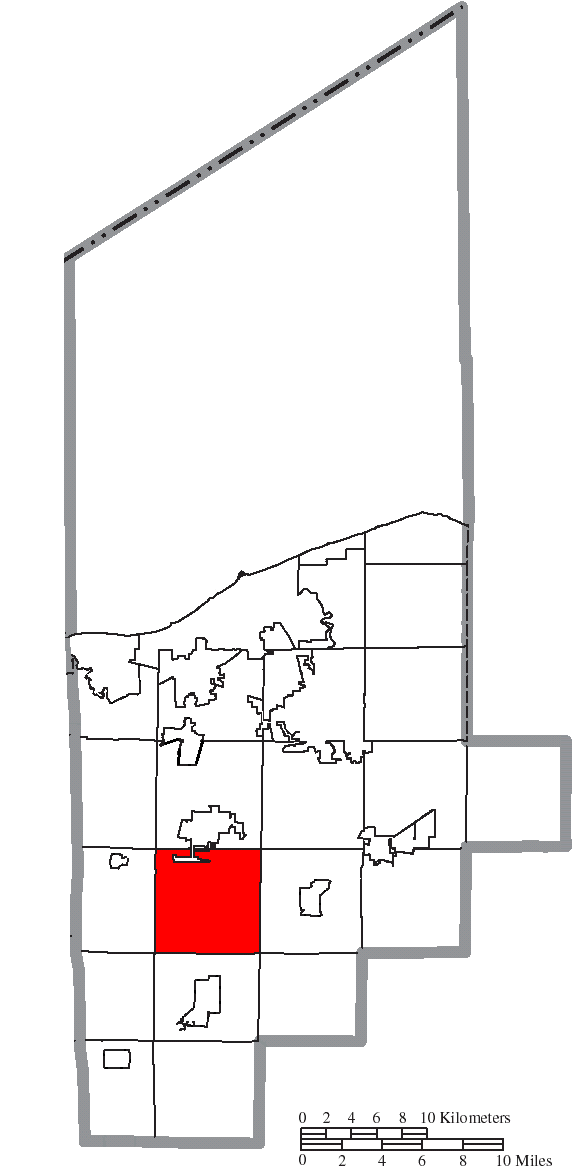
- Location of Pittsfield Township in Lorain County
- Coordinates: 41°14′38″N 82°12′52″W
- Country: United States
- State: Ohio
- County: Lorain

Area
  - Total: 26.02 sq mi (67.38 km^{2})
  - Land: 25.88 sq mi (67.02 km^{2})
  - Water: 0.14 sq mi (0.36 km^{2})
- Elevation: 820 ft (250 m)

Population (2020)
  - Total: 1,573
  - Density: 60.79/sq mi (23.47/km^{2})
- Time zone: UTC-5 (Eastern (EST))
  - Summer (DST): UTC-4 (EDT)
- FIPS code: 39-62960
- GNIS feature ID: 1086517
- Website: www.pittsfieldtwp.us

Pittsfield Township is one of the eighteen townships of Lorain County, Ohio, United States. As of the 2020 census the population was 1,573.

== Geography ==
The township is a rectangle measuring 5.25 miles (8.45 km) east to west and 5.15 miles (8.29 km) north to south. According to the U.S. Census Bureau, the total area is 26.0 square miles (67.4 km^{2}), of which 25.9 square miles (67.0 km^{2}) are land and 0.2 square miles (0.4 km^{2}), or 0.54%, are water. A portion of the city of Oberlin cuts into the northern part of the township but is a separate municipality. At the center of Pittsfield Township is the intersection of State Routes 58 and 303.

Located in central Lorain County, it borders the following townships and city:

- New Russia Township - north
- Oberlin - north
- Carlisle Township - northeast corner
- LaGrange Township - east
- Penfield Township - southeast corner
- Wellington Township - south
- Brighton Township - southwest corner
- Camden Township - west
- Henrietta Township - northwest corner

== Demographics ==
According to the United States Census Bureau, in 2000 Pittsfield had 1,549 residents with an average age of 39.33 years. The population density was 22.77 people/km^{2} (59.0 people/mi^{2}). There were 576 housing units. The median household income was $54,750 and the per capita income was $22,470.

== Name and history ==
It is the only Pittsfield Township statewide.

Pittsfield Township was part of the Connecticut Western Reserve. There were white settlers before 1813 but they left. Milton Whitney, one of the large landowners in the area, arranged for settlers to move in in 1821. In 1831, the township was separated from Wellington Township and named Pittsfield after Pittsfield, Massachusetts, Milton Whitney's original home. The township government was organized in 1832.

On April 11, 1965, one of the tornadoes in the Palm Sunday tornado outbreak passed through Pittsfield, killing seven people and destroying every building in the town.

== Government ==
The township is governed by a three-member board of trustees, who are elected in November of odd-numbered years to a four-year term beginning on the following January 1. Two are elected in the year after the presidential election and one is elected in the year before it. There is also an elected township fiscal officer, who serves a four-year term beginning on April 1 of the year after the election, which is held in November of the year before the presidential election. Vacancies in the fiscal officership or on the board of trustees are filled by the remaining trustees.
