= Homer Township, Medina County, Ohio =

Township in Ohio, US

- Township
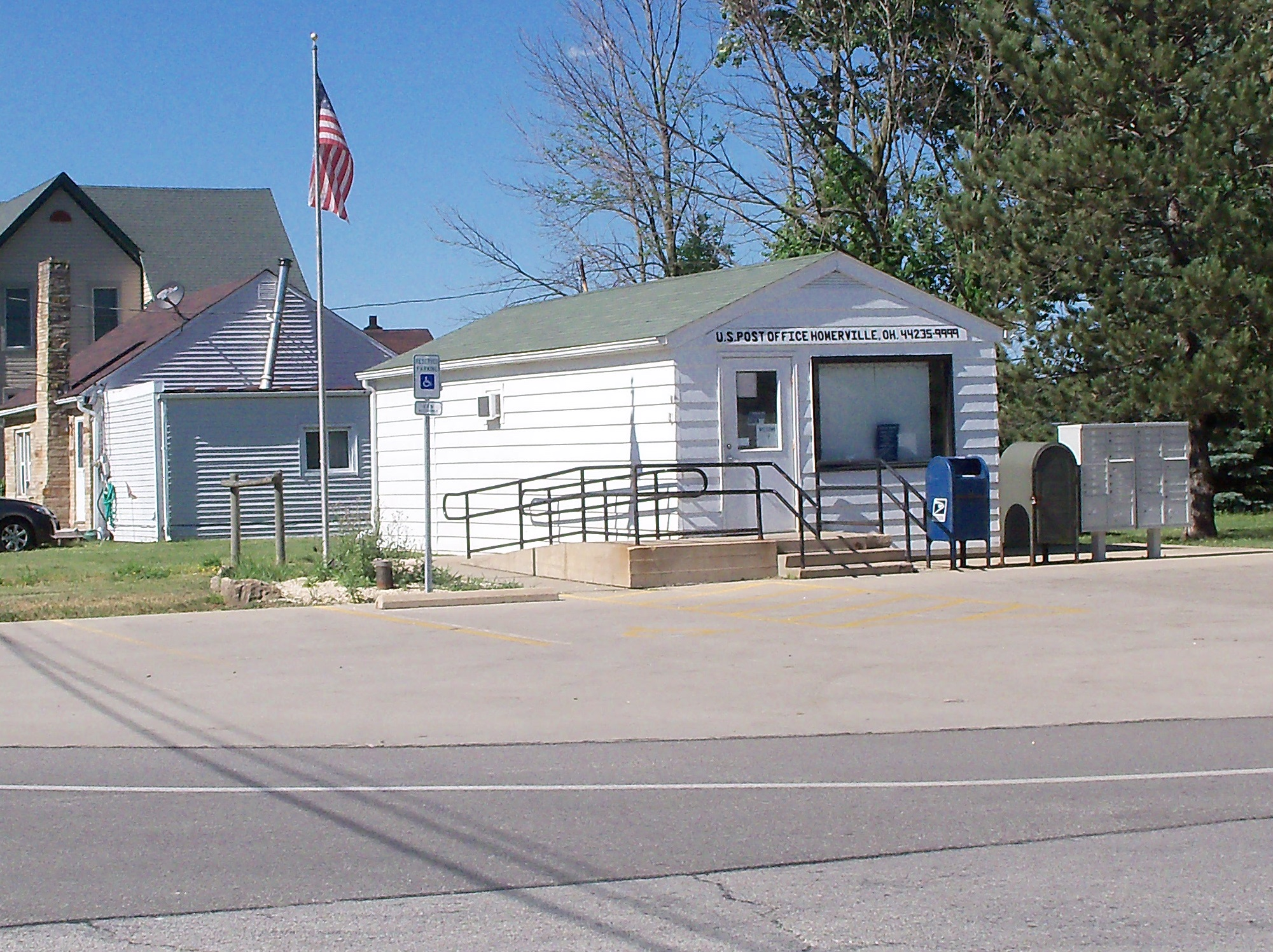
- Homerville Post Office

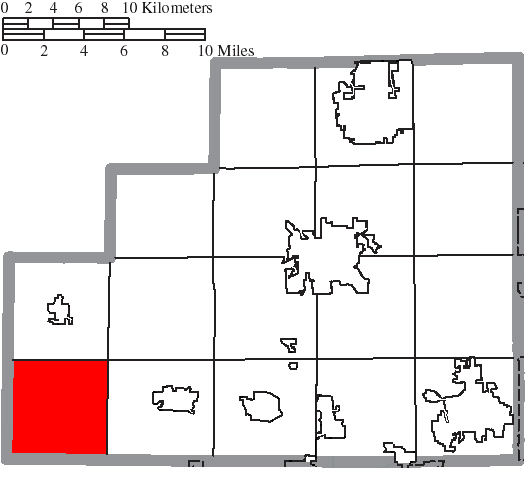
- Location of Homer Township in Medina County
- Coordinates: 41°1′11″N 82°7′27″W
- Country: United States
- State: Ohio
- County: Medina

Area
  - Total: 24.4 sq mi (63.3 km^{2})
  - Land: 24.4 sq mi (63.2 km^{2})
  - Water: 0.039 sq mi (0.1 km^{2})
- Elevation: 1,080 ft (330 m)

Population (2020)
  - Total: 1,606
  - Density: 65.8/sq mi (25.4/km^{2})
- Time zone: UTC-5 (Eastern (EST))
  - Summer (DST): UTC-4 (EDT)
- FIPS code: 39-36078
- GNIS feature ID: 1086596
- Website: https://www.homertwpohio.gov/

Historical population
Census	Pop.	Note	%±
1990	1,196		—
2000	1,461		22.2%
2010	1,462		0.1%
2020	1,606		9.8%
2024 (est.)	1,639		2.1%
U.S. Census:

Homer Township is one of the seventeen townships of Medina County, Ohio, United States. The 2020 census found 1,606 people in the township.

== Geography ==
Located in the part of the county, it borders the following townships:

- Spencer Township - north
- Chatham Township - northeast corner
- Harrisville Township - east
- Congress Township, Wayne County - southeast
- Jackson Township, Ashland County - southwest
- Sullivan Township, Ashland County - west
- Huntington Township, Lorain County - northwest corner

No municipalities are located in Homer Township, although the unincorporated community of Homerville lies at the center of the township.

== Name and history ==
Homer Township was established in 1839, and named after Homer, an ancient Greek poet. Statewide, the only other Homer Township is located in Morgan County.

== Government ==
The township is governed by a three-member board of trustees, who are elected in November of odd-numbered years to a four-year term beginning on the following January 1. Two are elected in the year after the presidential election and one is elected in the year before it. There is also an elected township fiscal officer, who serves a four-year term beginning on April 1 of the year after the election, which is held in November of the year before the presidential election. Vacancies in the fiscal officership or on the board of trustees are filled by the remaining trustees.
