= LaGrange Township, Lorain County, Ohio =

Township in Ohio, US

LaGrange Township
- Civil township
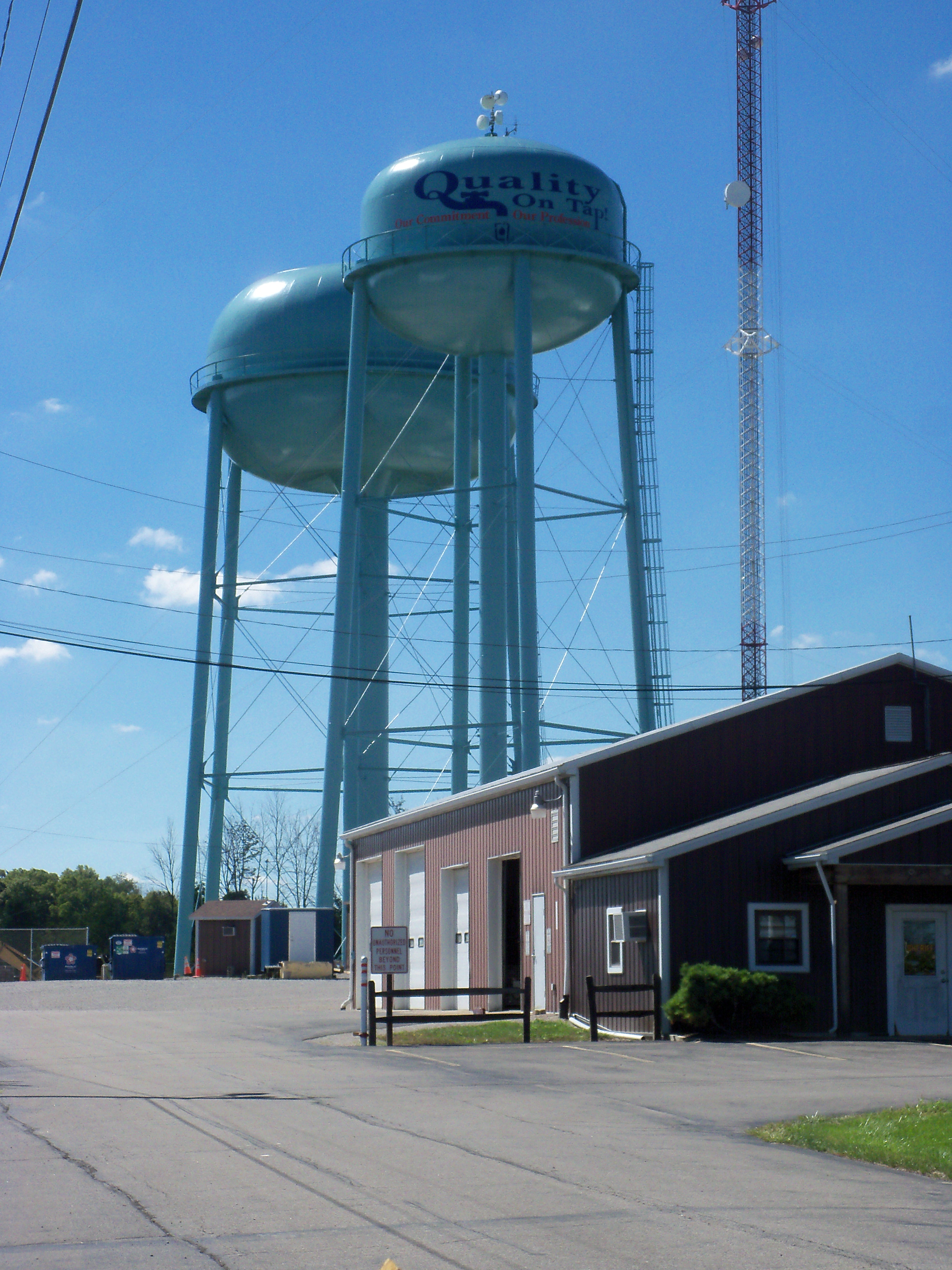
- Rural Lorain County Water Authority is west of LaGrange.

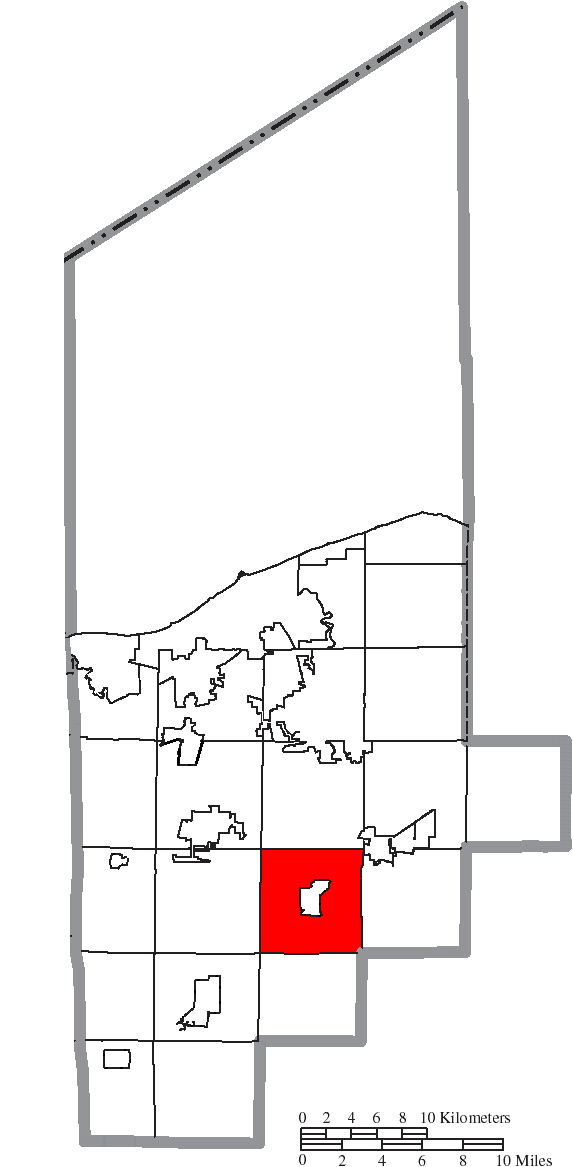
- Location of LaGrange Township in Lorain County
- Coordinates: 41°14′14″N 82°7′12″W
- Country: United States
- State: Ohio
- County: Lorain

Area
  - Total: 25.98 sq mi (67.28 km^{2})
  - Land: 25.78 sq mi (66.77 km^{2})
  - Water: 0.20 sq mi (0.51 km^{2})
- Elevation: 825 ft (251 m)

Population (2020)
  - Total: 6,560
  - Density: 254/sq mi (98.2/km^{2})
- Time zone: UTC-5 (Eastern (EST))
  - Summer (DST): UTC-4 (EDT)
- FIPS code: 39-41244
- GNIS feature ID: 1086513
- Website: www.lagrangetownshipohio.net

LaGrange Township is one of the eighteen townships of Lorain County, Ohio, United States. As of the 2020 census the population was 6,560.

== Geography ==
Located in central Lorain County, it borders the following townships and village:

- Carlisle Township - north
- Grafton - northeast
- Grafton Township - east
- Litchfield Township, Medina County - southeast corner
- Penfield Township - south
- Wellington Township - southwest corner
- Pittsfield Township - west
- New Russia Township - northwest corner

The village of LaGrange is located in central LaGrange Township, and the community of Pheasant Run is in the southwest part of the township.

== Name and history ==
It is the only LaGrange Township statewide.

== Government ==
The township is governed by a three-member board of trustees, who are elected in November of odd-numbered years to a four-year term beginning on the following January 1. Two are elected in the year after the presidential election and one is elected in the year before it. There is also an elected township fiscal officer, who serves a four-year term beginning on April 1 of the year after the election, which is held in November of the year before the presidential election. Vacancies in the fiscal officership or on the board of trustees are filled by the remaining trustees.
