= Litchfield Township, Medina County, Ohio =

Township in Ohio, US

- Township
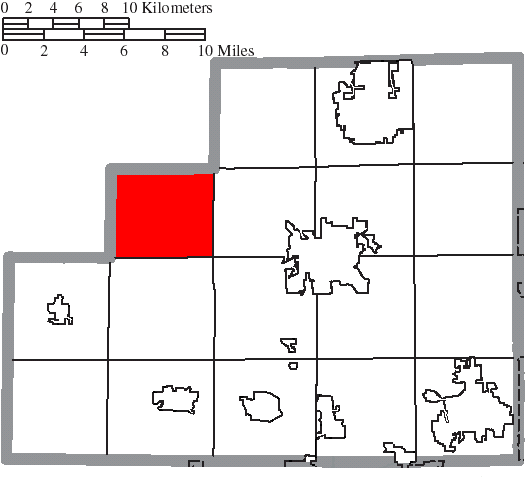
- Location of Litchfield Township in Medina County
- Coordinates: 41°10′4″N 82°1′25″W
- Country: United States
- State: Ohio
- County: Medina

Area
  - Total: 22.4 sq mi (58.0 km^{2})
  - Land: 22.4 sq mi (58.0 km^{2})
  - Water: 0 sq mi (0.0 km^{2})
- Elevation: 1,030 ft (314 m)

Population (2020)
  - Total: 3,215
  - Density: 144/sq mi (55.4/km^{2})
- Time zone: UTC-5 (Eastern (EST))
  - Summer (DST): UTC-4 (EDT)
- ZIP code: 44253
- Area code: 330
- FIPS code: 39-44072
- GNIS feature ID: 1086598
- Website: https://www.litchfieldtownship.com/

Litchfield Township is one of the seventeen townships of Medina County, Ohio, United States. The 2020 census found 3,215 people in the township.

== Geography ==
Located in the west part of the county, it borders the following townships:

- Grafton Township, Lorain County - north
- Liverpool Township - northeast corner
- York Township - east
- Lafayette Township - southeast corner
- Chatham Township - south
- Spencer Township - southwest corner
- Penfield Township, Lorain County - west
- LaGrange Township, Lorain County - northwest corner

No municipalities are located in Litchfield Township, although the unincorporated community of Litchfield lies at the center of the township.

== Name and history ==
Litchfield Township was organized in 1831. Named after Litchfield, Connecticut, it is the only Litchfield Township statewide.

== Government ==
The township is governed by a three-member board of trustees, who are elected in November of odd-numbered years to a four-year term beginning on the following January 1. Two are elected in the year after the presidential election and one is elected in the year before it. There is also an elected township fiscal officer, who serves a four-year term beginning on April 1 of the year after the election, which is held in November of the year before the presidential election. Vacancies in the fiscal officership or on the board of trustees are filled by the remaining trustees.
