= Huntington Township, Lorain County, Ohio =

Township in Ohio, US

- Township
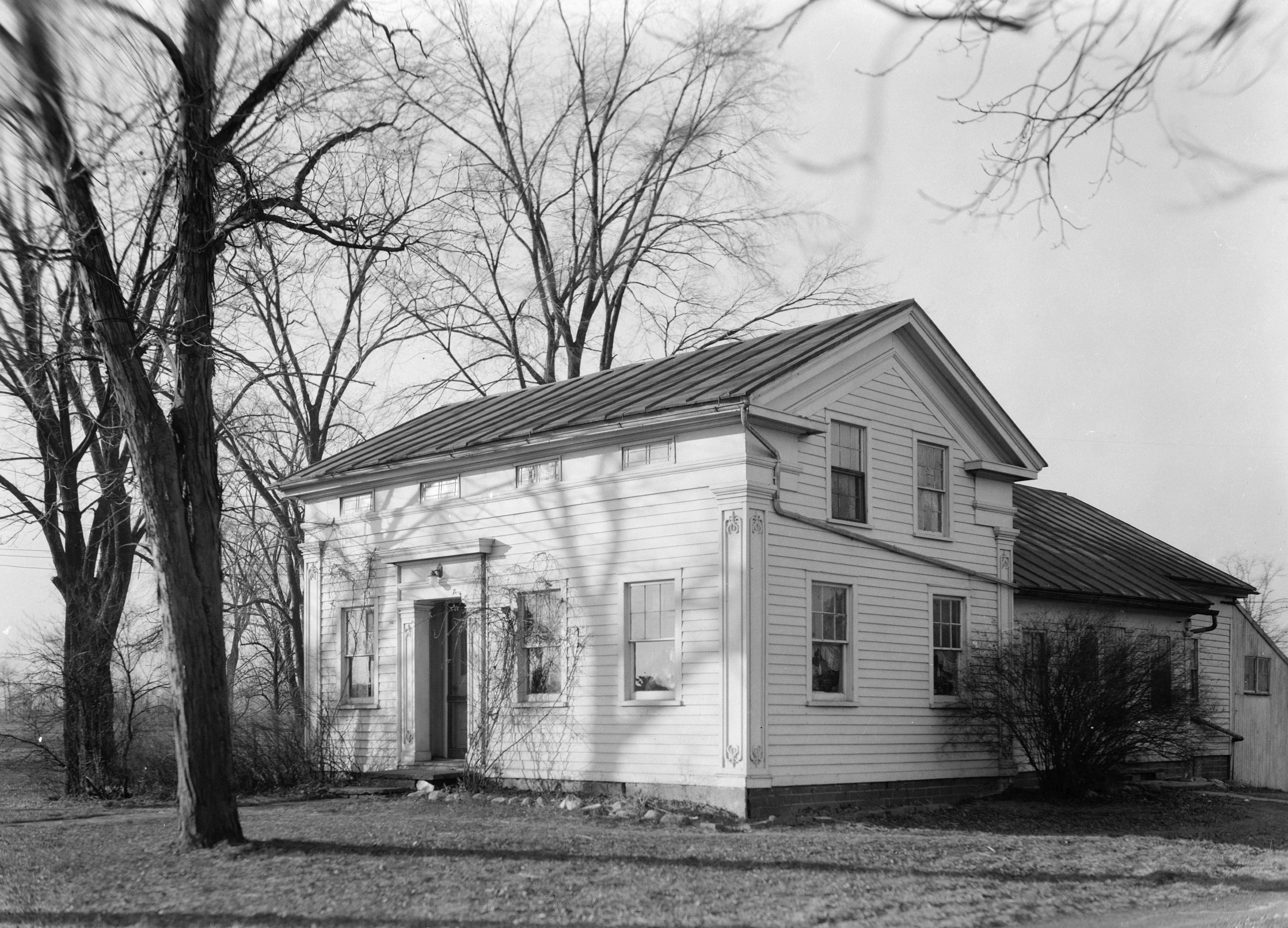
- Whitney Clark House south of Wellington

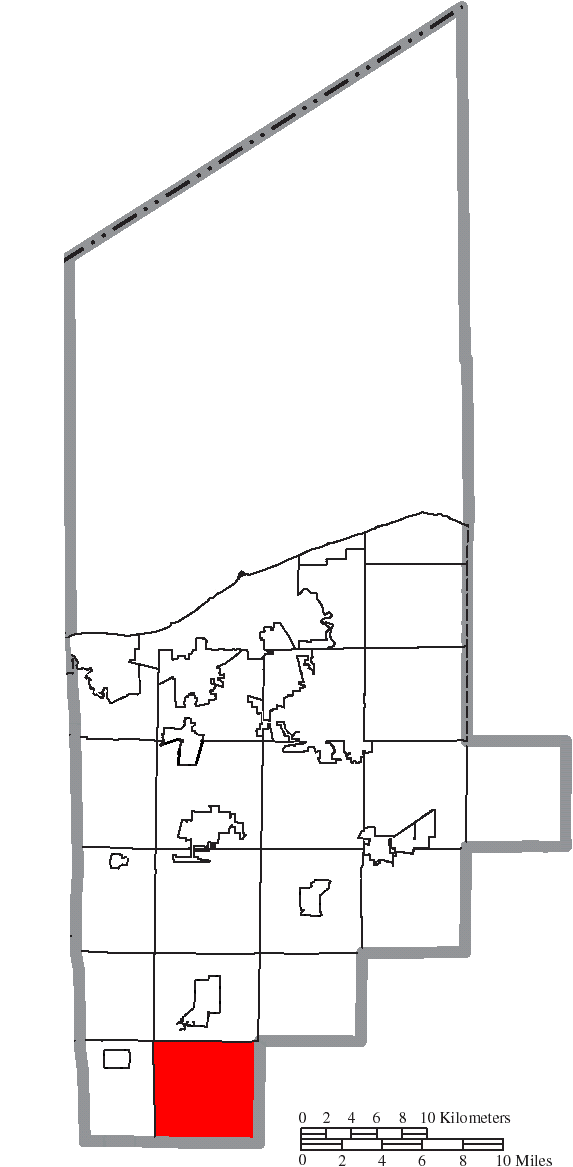
- Location of Huntington Township in Lorain County
- Coordinates: 41°5′45″N 82°14′8″W
- Country: United States
- State: Ohio
- County: Lorain

Area
  - Total: 26.18 sq mi (67.80 km^{2})
  - Land: 25.89 sq mi (67.06 km^{2})
  - Water: 0.29 sq mi (0.74 km^{2})
- Elevation: 928 ft (283 m)

Population (2020)
  - Total: 1,361
  - Density: 52.56/sq mi (20.30/km^{2})
- Time zone: UTC-5 (Eastern (EST))
  - Summer (DST): UTC-4 (EDT)
- FIPS code: 39-36876
- GNIS feature ID: 1086512
- Website: www.huntingtontwp.org

Huntington Township is one of the eighteen townships of Lorain County, Ohio, United States. As of the 2020 census, the population was 1,361.

== Geography ==
Located in southeastern Lorain County, it borders the following townships:

- Wellington Township - north
- Penfield Township - northeast corner
- Spencer Township, Medina County - east
- Homer Township, Medina County - southeast corner
- Sullivan Township, Ashland County - south
- Troy Township, Ashland County - southwest corner
- Rochester Township - west
- Brighton Township - northwest corner

No municipalities are located in Huntington Township.

== Name and history ==
Huntington Township was established in 1822, and named after Huntington, Connecticut, the native home of an early settler. Statewide, other Huntington Townships are located in Brown, Gallia, and Ross counties.

== Government ==
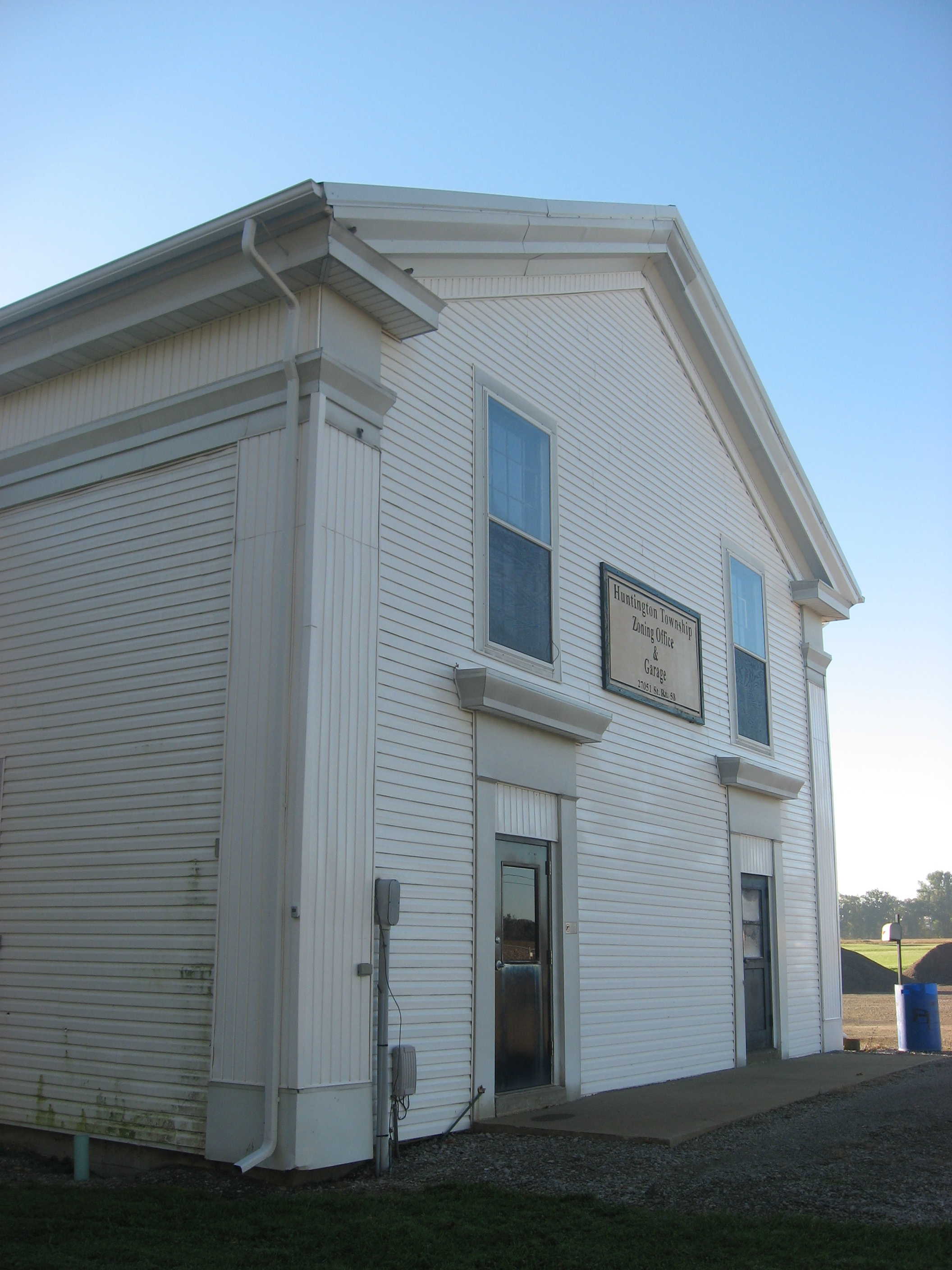
Huntington Town Hall

The township is governed by a three-member board of trustees, who are elected in November of odd-numbered years to a four-year term beginning on the following January 1. Two are elected in the year after the presidential election and one is elected in the year before it. There is also an elected township fiscal officer, who serves a four-year term beginning on April 1 of the year after the election, which is held in November of the year before the presidential election. Vacancies in the fiscal officership or on the board of trustees are filled by the remaining trustees.

== Notable people ==
- Myron T. Herrick, 42nd governor of Ohio
