= Chatham Township, Ohio =

Township in Ohio, US

- Township
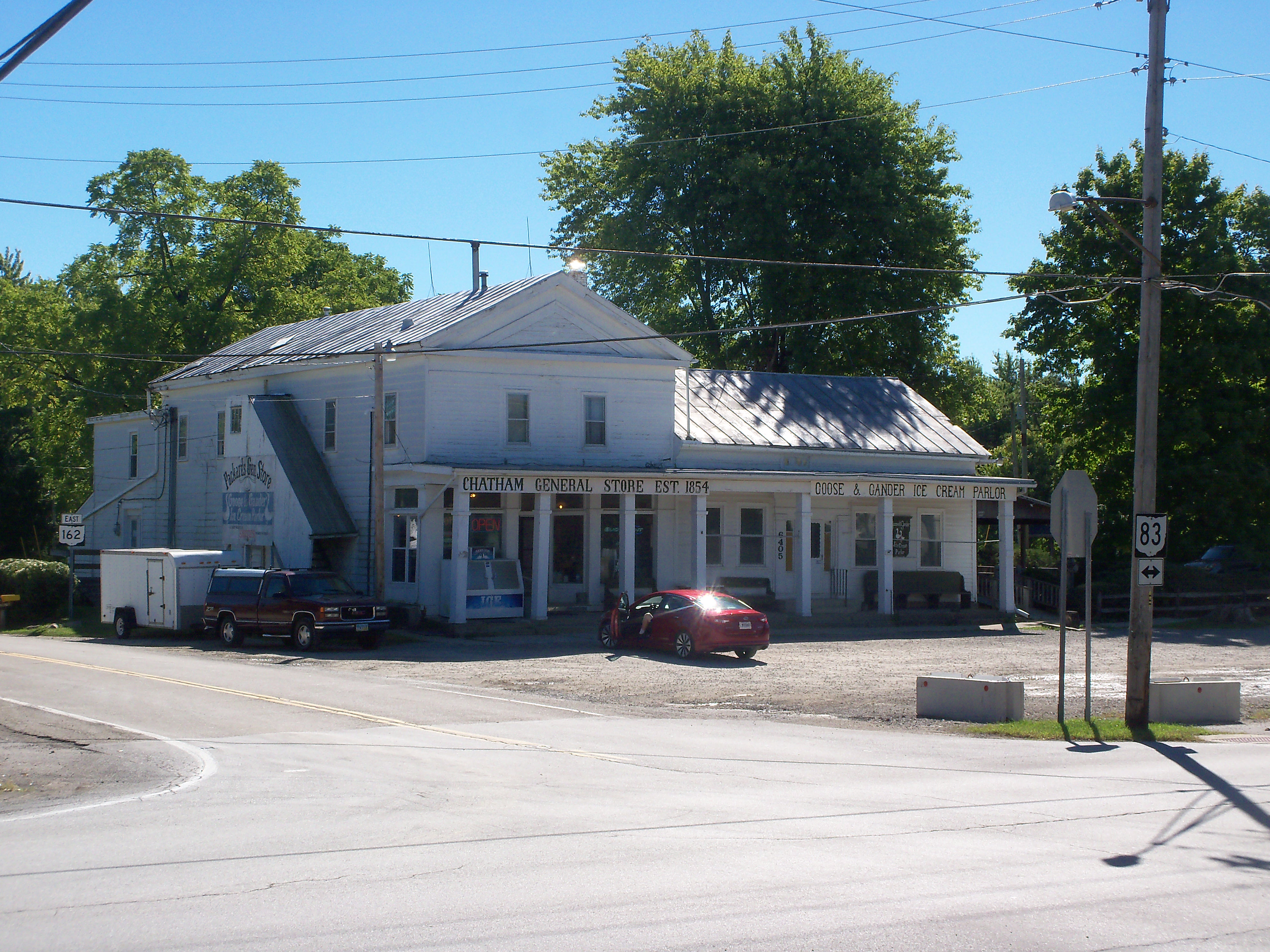
- Chatham General Store has served the community since 1854

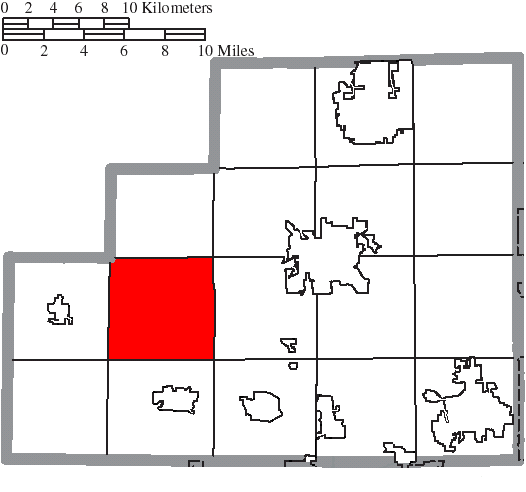
- Location of Chatham Township in Medina County

- Location within Ohio
- Coordinates: 41°05′57.5″N 82°01′27.5″W
- Country: United States
- State: Ohio
- County: Medina

Area
  - Total: 26.36 sq mi (68.26 km^{2})
  - Land: 26.34 sq mi (68.21 km^{2})
  - Water: 0.019 sq mi (0.05 km^{2})
- Elevation: 1,125 ft (343 m)

Population (2020)
  - Total: 2,213
- Time zone: UTC-5 (Eastern (EST))
  - Summer (DST): UTC-4 (EDT)
- ZIP code: 44256, 44275
- Area code: 330
- FIPS code: 39-13750
- GNIS feature ID: 1086591
- Website: https://www.chathamtwp.com/

Chatham Township is one of the seventeen townships of Medina County, Ohio, United States. The 2020 census found 2,213 people in the township.

== Geography ==
Located in the west part of the county, it borders the following townships:

- Litchfield Township - north
- York Township - northeast corner
- Lafayette Township - east
- Westfield Township - southeast corner
- Harrisville Township - south
- Homer Township - southwest corner
- Spencer Township - west
- Penfield Township, Lorain County - northwest corner

No municipalities are located in Chatham Township.

== Name and history ==
Chatham Township was founded in 1818. Named after Chatham, in England, it is the only Chatham Township in Ohio.

== Government ==
The township is governed by a three-member board of trustees, who are elected in November of odd-numbered years to four-year terms beginning on the following January 1. Two are elected in the year after the presidential election and one is elected in the year before it. There is also an elected township fiscal officer, who serves a four-year term beginning on April 1 of the year after the election, which is held in November of the year before the presidential election. Vacancies in the fiscal officership or on the board of trustees are filled by the remaining trustees.
