= Rochester Township, Lorain County, Ohio =

Township in Ohio, US

- Township
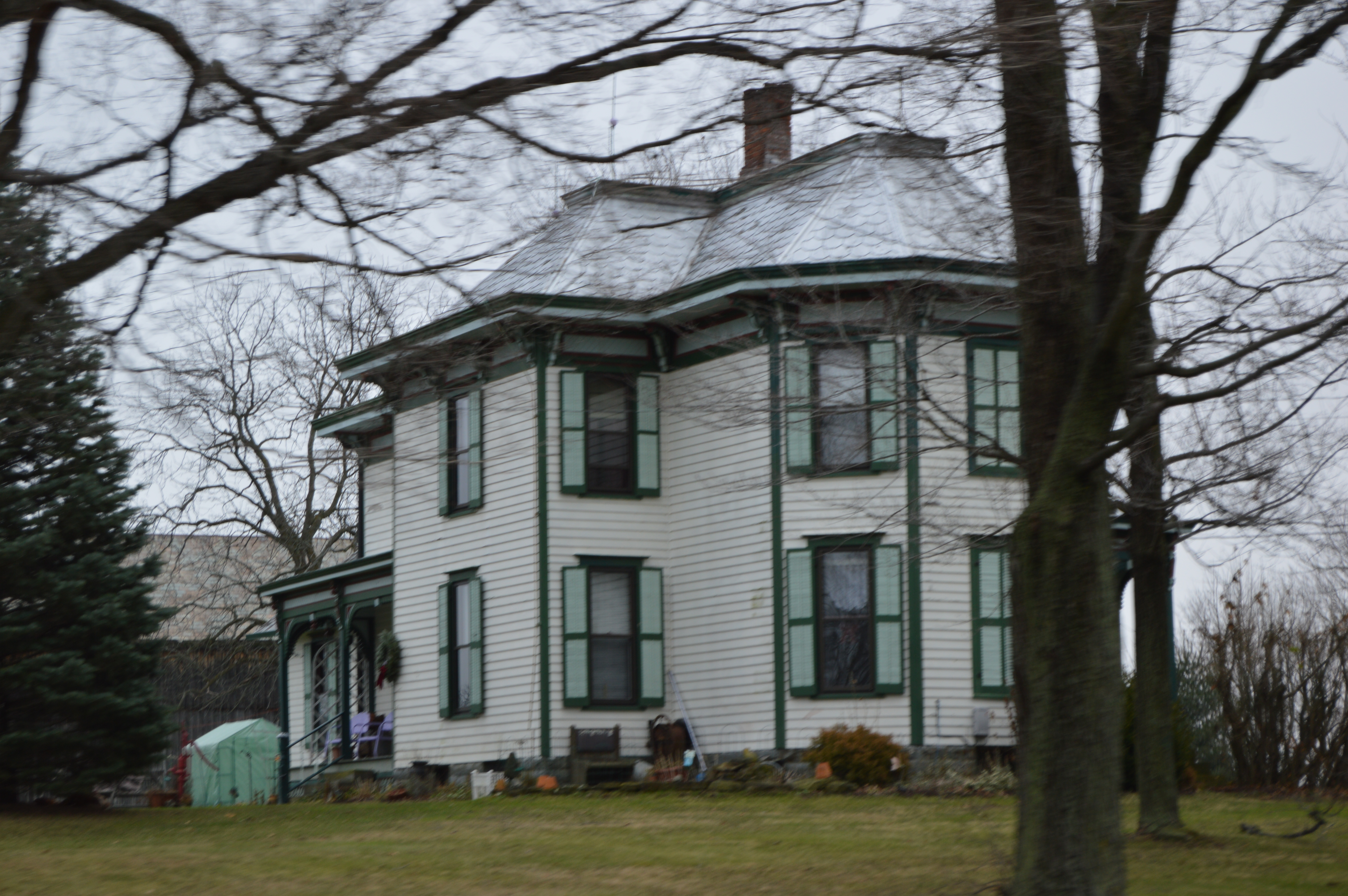
- The Henry Bradford Farmhouse on State Route 511

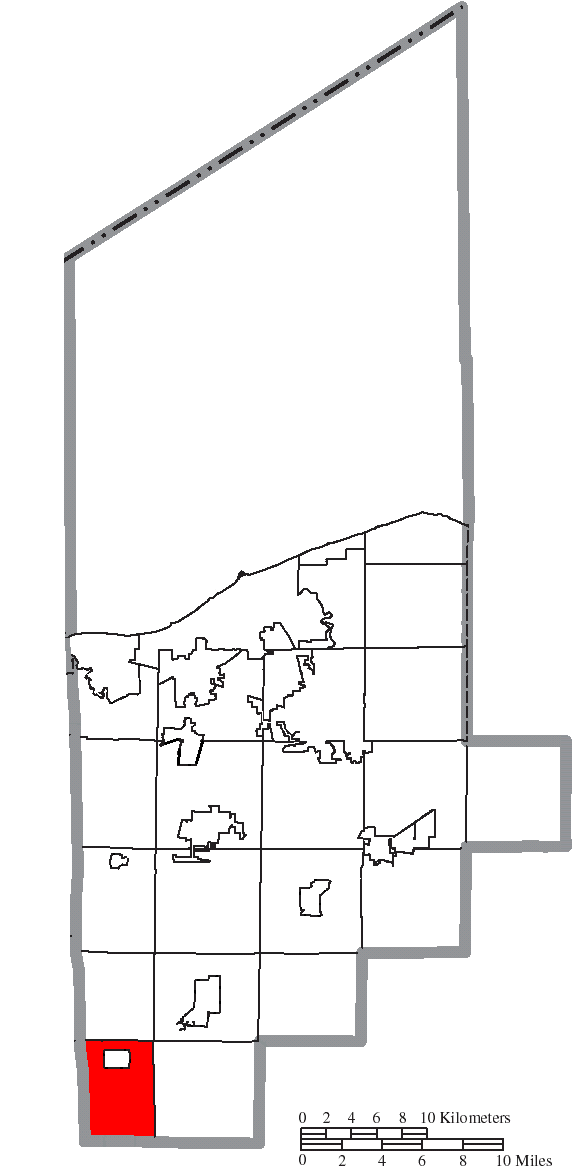
- Location of Rochester Township in Lorain County
- Coordinates: 41°6′32″N 82°18′1″W
- Country: United States
- State: Ohio
- County: Lorain

Area
  - Total: 17.66 sq mi (45.74 km^{2})
  - Land: 17.63 sq mi (45.67 km^{2})
  - Water: 0.023 sq mi (0.06 km^{2})
- Elevation: 942 ft (287 m)

Population (2020)
  - Total: 792
  - Density: 44.9/sq mi (17.3/km^{2})
- Time zone: UTC-5 (Eastern (EST))
  - Summer (DST): UTC-4 (EDT)
- ZIP code: 44090
- Area code: 440
- FIPS code: 39-67776
- GNIS feature ID: 1086518
- Website: www.rochesterohio.com

Rochester Township is one of the eighteen townships of Lorain County, Ohio, United States. As of the 2020 census the population was 792.

== Geography ==
Located in southwestern Lorain County, it borders the following townships:

- Brighton Township - north
- Wellington Township - northeast corner
- Huntington Township - east
- Sullivan Township, Ashland County - southeast corner
- Troy Township, Ashland County - south
- Ruggles Township, Ashland County - southwest corner
- New London Township, Huron County - west
- Clarksfield Township, Huron County - northwest corner

The village of Rochester is located in northern Rochester Township.

== Name and history ==
It is the only Rochester Township statewide.

== Government ==
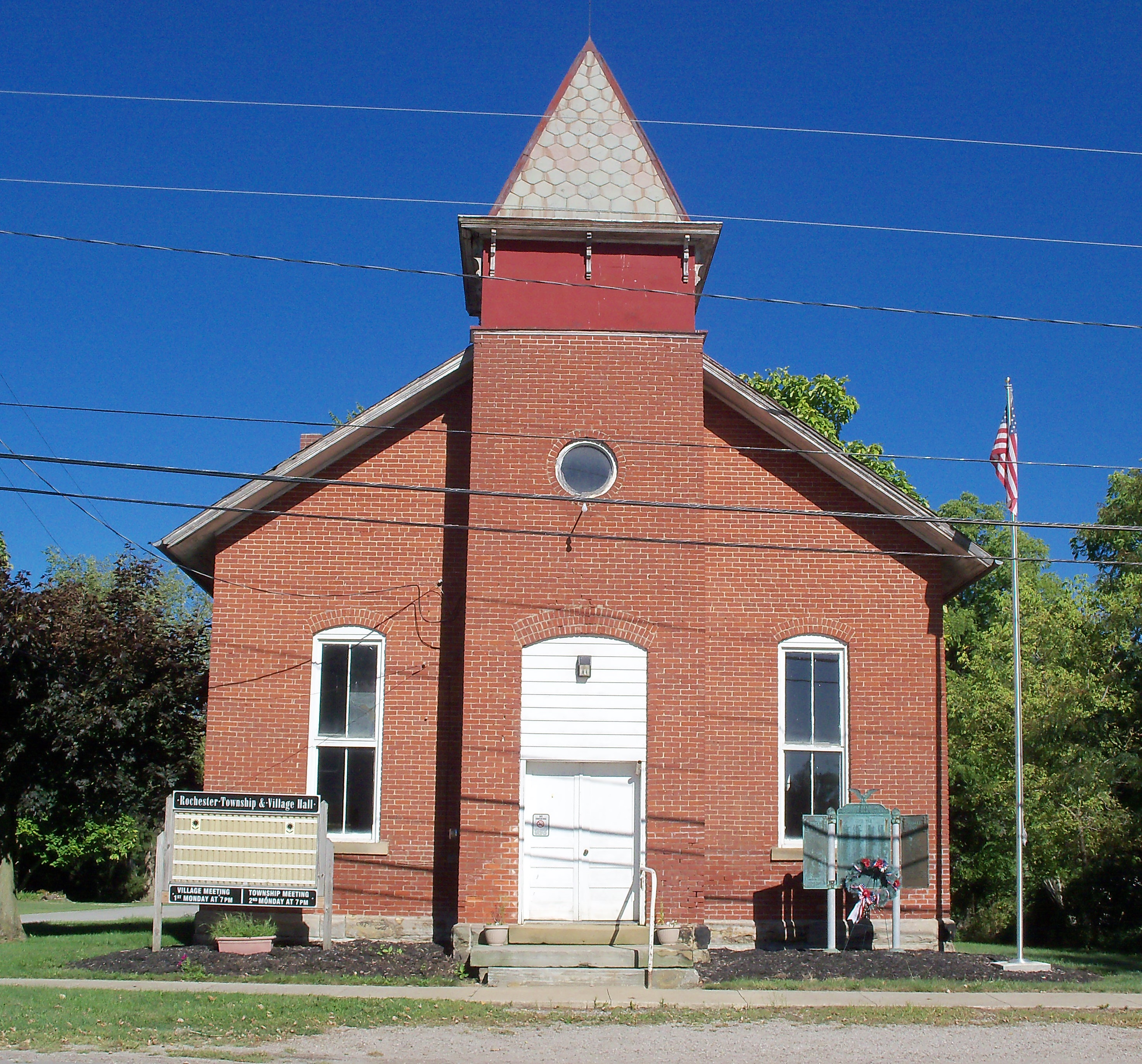
Rochester Village and Rochester Township Hall

The township is governed by a three-member board of trustees, who are elected in November of odd-numbered years to a four-year term beginning on the following January 1. Two are elected in the year after the presidential election and one is elected in the year before it. There is also an elected township fiscal officer, who serves a four-year term beginning on April 1 of the year after the election, which is held in November of the year before the presidential election. Vacancies in the clerkship or on the board of trustees are filled by the remaining trustees.
