= Lafayette Township, Medina County, Ohio =

Township in Ohio, US

- Township
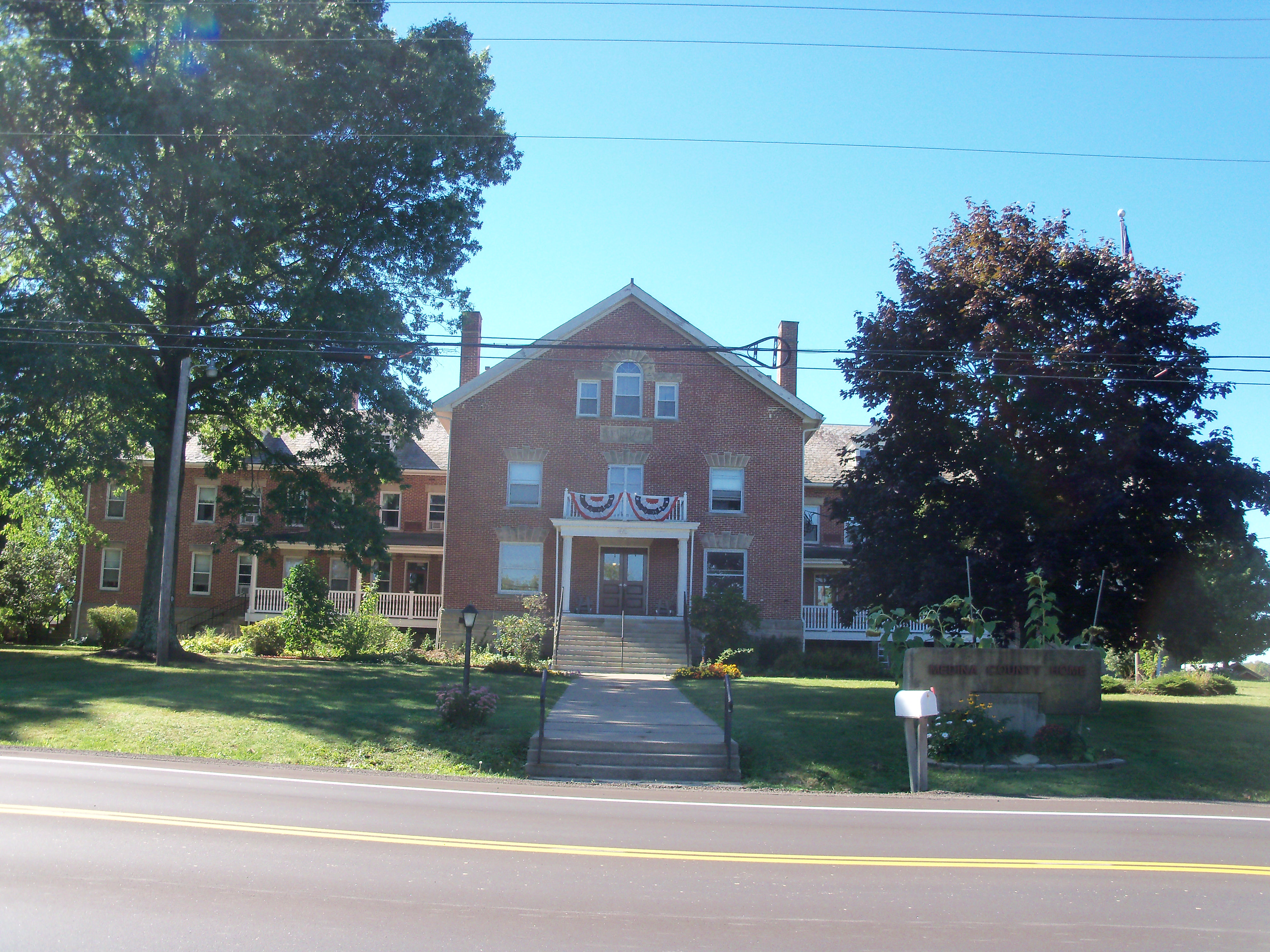
- The Medina County Home has served residents since 1894

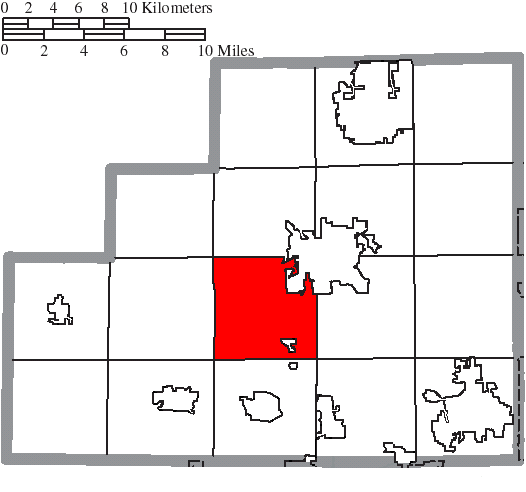
- Location of Lafayette Township in Medina County
- Coordinates: 41°5′4″N 81°54′28″W
- Country: United States
- State: Ohio
- County: Medina

Area
  - Total: 23.7 sq mi (61.3 km^{2})
  - Land: 23.2 sq mi (60.0 km^{2})
  - Water: 0.50 sq mi (1.3 km^{2})
- Elevation: 1,020 ft (311 m)

Population (2020)
  - Total: 6,056
  - Density: 261/sq mi (101/km^{2})
- Time zone: UTC-5 (Eastern (EST))
  - Summer (DST): UTC-4 (EDT)
- FIPS code: 39-41174
- GNIS feature ID: 1086597
- Website: Township website

Lafayette Township is one of the seventeen townships of Medina County, Ohio, United States. The 2020 census found 6,056 people in the township.

== Geography ==
Located in the central part of the county, it borders the following townships:

- York Township - north
- Medina Township - northeast
- Montville Township - east
- Guilford Township - southeast corner
- Westfield Township - south
- Harrisville Township - southwest corner
- Chatham Township - west
- Litchfield Township - northwest corner

Two municipalities are located in Lafayette Township: the village of Chippewa Lake in the southeast, and part of the city of Medina, the county seat of Medina County, in the northeast.

Former villages include Lafayette and Whittlesey.

== Name and history ==
Statewide, the only other Lafayette Township is located in Coshocton County.

== Government ==
The township is governed by a three-member board of trustees, who are elected in November of odd-numbered years to a four-year term beginning on the following January 1. Two are elected in the year after the presidential election and one is elected in the year before it. There is also an elected township fiscal officer, who serves a four-year term beginning on April 1 of the year after the election, which is held in November of the year before the presidential election. Vacancies in the Fiscal Officership or on the Board of Trustees are filled by the trustees who remain.

As of 2023 the board was composed of Ty Fullerton, Chris O'Neil, and Marty Warchola, and the fiscal officer is Laura Ruebensaal.
