= Sullivan, Ohio =

Unincorporated community in Ohio, U.S.

Coordinates: 41°01′41″N 82°13′16″W

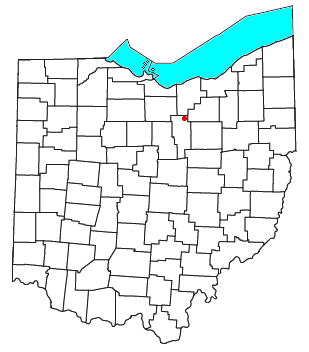
Location of Sullivan, Ohio

Sullivan is an unincorporated community and census designated place in central Sullivan Township, Ashland County, Ohio, United States. As of the 2020 census, Sullivan had a population of 603. It has a post office with the ZIP code 44880. It lies at the intersection of U.S. Route 224 with State Route 58.

== History ==
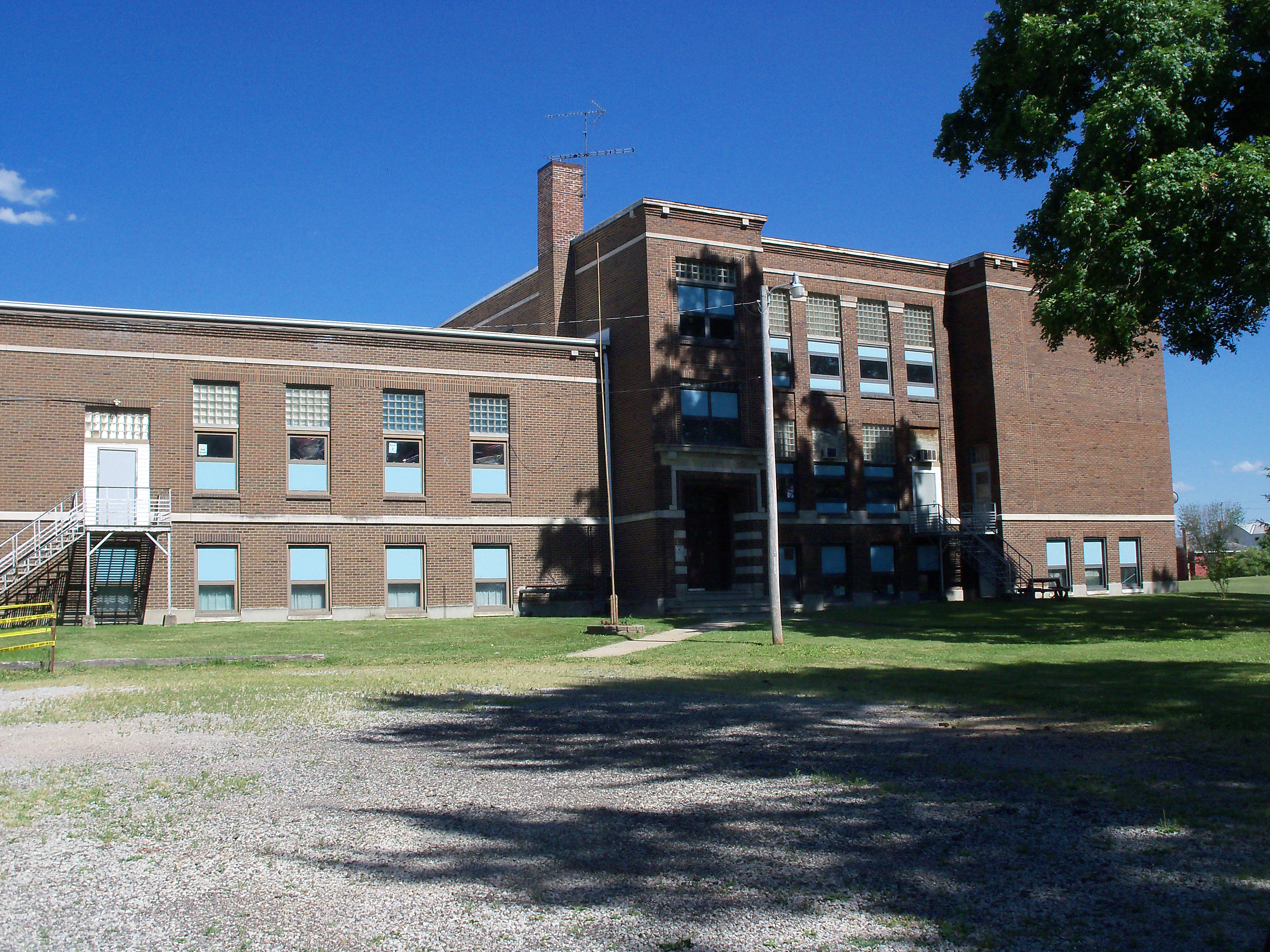
Old Sullivan High School

Sullivan was laid out in 1836. A post office called Sullivan has been in operation since 1828, which was closed in the summer of 2015.
