= York Township, Medina County, Ohio =

Township in Ohio, US

- Township
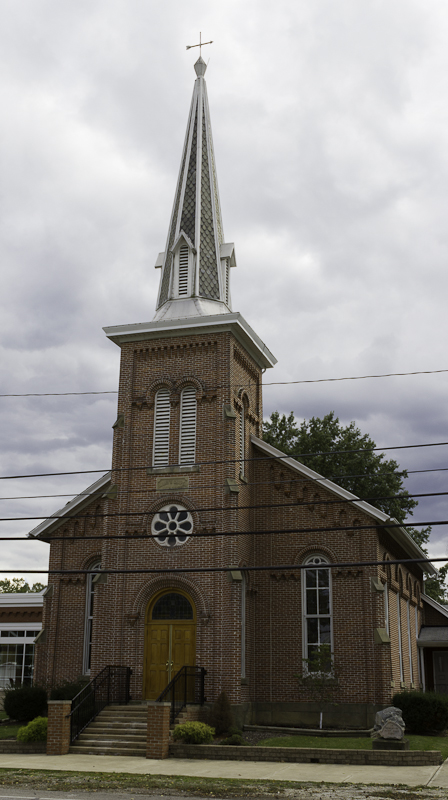
- York United Methodist Church in Mallet Creek

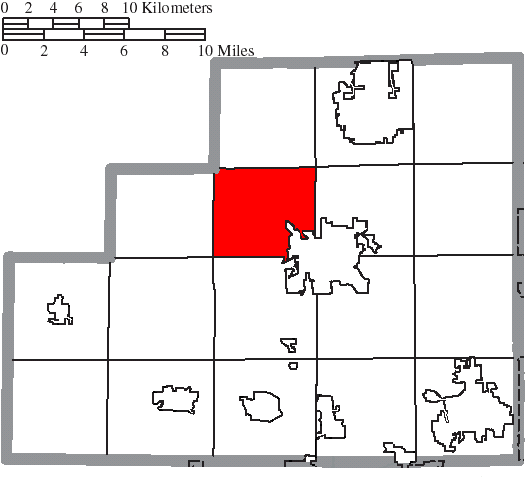
- Location of York Township in Medina County
- Coordinates: 41°10′3″N 81°55′29″W
- Country: United States
- State: Ohio
- County: Medina

Area
  - Total: 20.5 sq mi (53.1 km^{2})
  - Land: 20.4 sq mi (52.9 km^{2})
  - Water: 0.077 sq mi (0.2 km^{2})
- Elevation: 974 ft (297 m)

Population (2020)
  - Total: 4,284
  - Density: 210/sq mi (81.0/km^{2})
- Time zone: UTC-5 (Eastern (EST))
  - Summer (DST): UTC-4 (EDT)
- FIPS code: 39-87052
- GNIS feature ID: 1086607

York Township is one of the seventeen townships of Medina County, Ohio, United States. The 2020 census found 4,284 people in the township.

== Geography ==
Located in the central part of the county, it borders the following townships:

- Liverpool Township - north
- Brunswick Hills Township - northeast corner
- Medina Township - east
- Montville Township - southeast corner
- Lafayette Township - south
- Chatham Township - southwest corner
- Litchfield Township - west
- Grafton Township, Lorain County - northwest corner

Part of the city of Medina, the county seat of Medina County, is located in southeastern York Township.

== Name and history ==
York Township was organized in 1832, and named after New York, the native state of a large share of the early settlers. It is one of ten York Townships statewide.

== Government ==
The township is governed by a three-member board of trustees, who are elected in November of odd-numbered years to a four-year term beginning on the following January 1. Two are elected in the year after the presidential election and one is elected in the year before it. There is also an elected township fiscal officer, who serves a four-year term beginning on April 1 of the year after the election, which is held in November of the year before the presidential election. Vacancies in the fiscal officership or on the board of trustees are filled by the remaining trustees.
