= Spencer, Ohio =

- Village
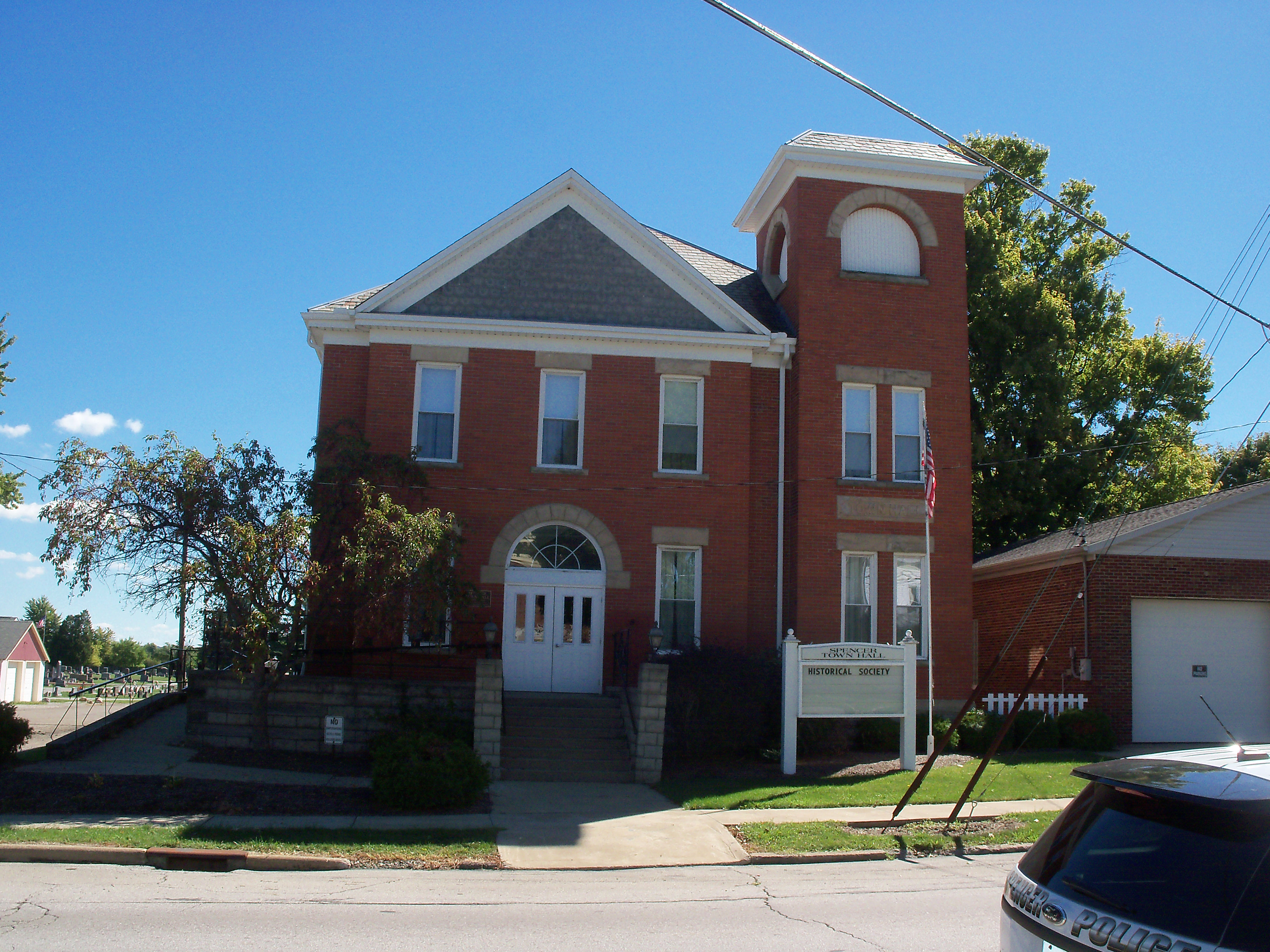
- Old Town Hall now houses Spencer Historical Society

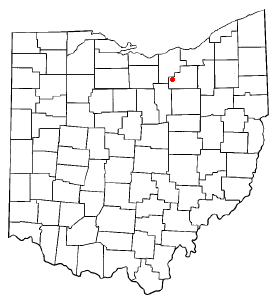
- Location of Spencer, Ohio

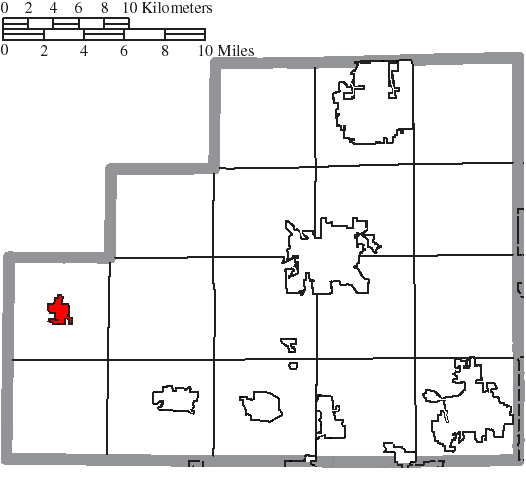
- Location of Spencer in Medina County
- Coordinates: 41°05′59″N 82°07′32″W
- Country: United States
- State: Ohio
- County: Medina

Area
  - Total: 0.99 sq mi (2.57 km^{2})
  - Land: 0.98 sq mi (2.55 km^{2})
  - Water: 0.0077 sq mi (0.02 km^{2})
- Elevation: 915 ft (279 m)

Population (2020)
  - Total: 684
  - Density: 693.7/sq mi (267.83/km^{2})
- Time zone: UTC-5 (Eastern (EST))
  - Summer (DST): UTC-4 (EDT)
- ZIP code: 44275
- Area code: 330
- FIPS code: 39-73992
- GNIS feature ID: 2399870
- Website: spencervillageohio.com

Spencer is a village in Spencer Township located in Medina County, Ohio, United States. The population was 684 at the 2020 census.

== History ==
A post office called Spencer has been in operation since 1849. The village takes its name from Spencer Township.

== Geography ==
According to the United States Census Bureau, the village has a total area of 1.00 square mile (2.59 km^{2}), of which, 0.99 square miles (2.56 km^{2}) is land and 0.01 square miles (0.03 km^{2}) is water.

== Demographics ==
Historical population
Census	Pop.	Note	%±
1880	159		—
1920	527		—
1930	592		12.3%
1940	591		−0.2%
1950	740		25.2%
1960	742		0.3%
1970	758		2.2%
1980	764		0.8%
1990	726		−5.0%
2000	747		2.9%
2010	753		0.8%
2020	684		−9.2%
U.S. Decennial Census

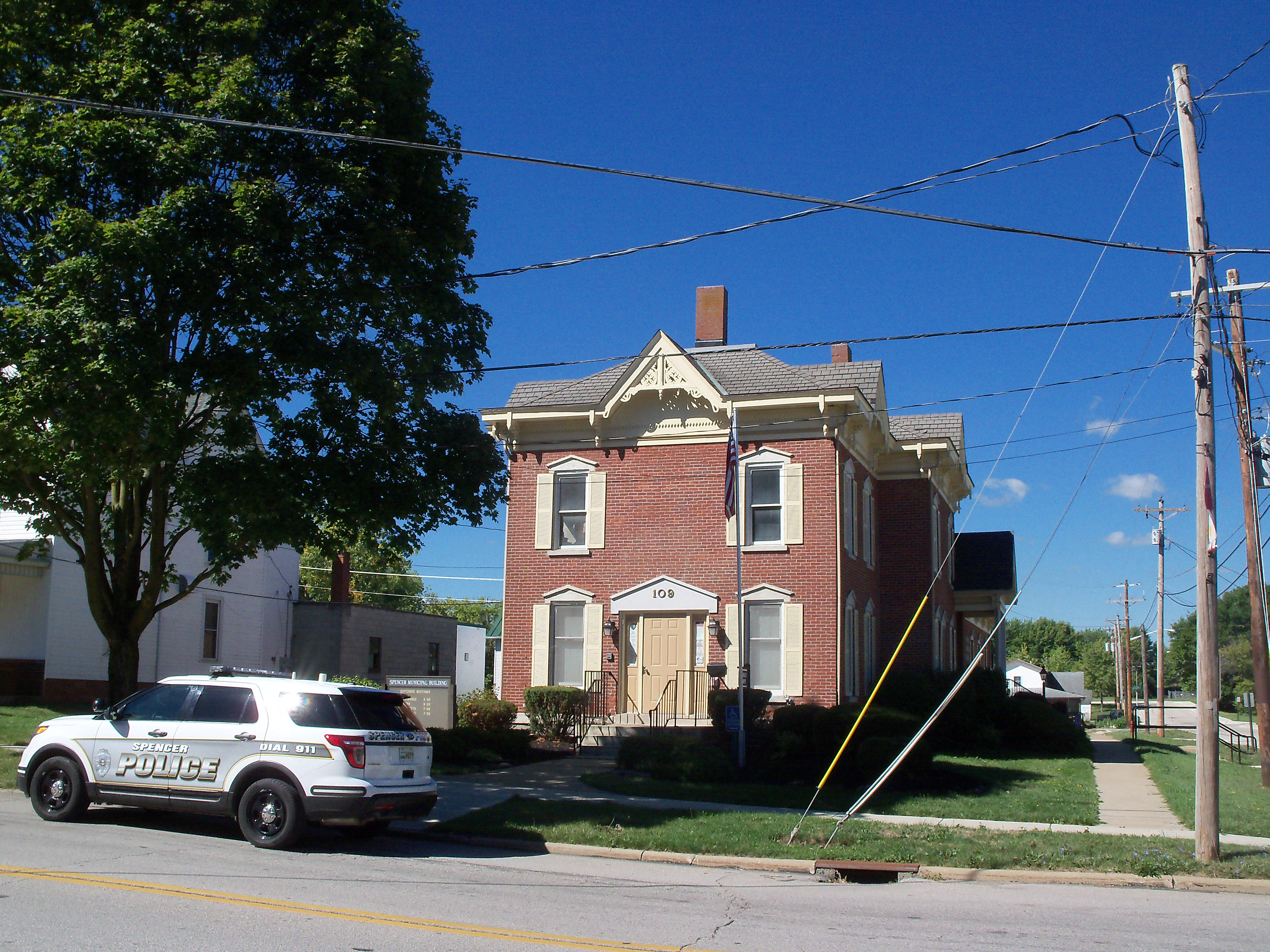
Spencer Municipal Building

=== 2010 census ===
As of the census of 2010, there were 753 people, 283 households, and 203 families living in the village. The population density was 760.6 inhabitants per square mile (293.7/km^{2}). There were 306 housing units at an average density of 309.1 per square mile (119.3/km^{2}). The racial makeup of the village was 97.5% White, 0.1% African American, 0.1% Native American, 0.3% Asian, 0.5% from other races, and 1.5% from two or more races. Hispanic or Latino of any race were 3.1% of the population.

There were 283 households, of which 37.1% had children under the age of 18 living with them, 56.2% were married couples living together, 9.9% had a female householder with no husband present, 5.7% had a male householder with no wife present, and 28.3% were non-families. 23.0% of all households were made up of individuals, and 13.1% had someone living alone who was 65 years of age or older. The average household size was 2.66 and the average family size was 3.09.

The median age in the village was 37.3 years. 27.5% of residents were under the age of 18; 8.3% were between the ages of 18 and 24; 25.7% were from 25 to 44; 24.3% were from 45 to 64; and 13.9% were 65 years of age or older. The gender makeup of the village was 49.4% male and 50.6% female.

=== 2000 census ===
As of the census of 2000, there were 747 people, 285 households, and 204 families living in the village. The population density was 755.8 inhabitants per square mile (291.8/km^{2}). There were 296 housing units at an average density of 299.5 per square mile (115.6/km^{2}). The racial makeup of the village was 99.06% White, 0.54% Native American, 0.13% Asian, and 0.27% from two or more races. Hispanic or Latino of any race were 0.80% of the population.

There were 285 households, out of which 37.9% had children under the age of 18 living with them, 57.9% were married couples living together, 9.8% had a female householder with no husband present, and 28.1% were non-families. 21.4% of all households were made up of individuals, and 9.1% had someone living alone who was 65 years of age or older. The average household size was 2.62 and the average family size was 3.09.

In the village, the population was spread out, with 30.0% under the age of 18, 6.8% from 18 to 24, 32.1% from 25 to 44, 20.6% from 45 to 64, and 10.4% who were 65 years of age or older. The median age was 34 years. For every 100 females there were 95.5 males. For every 100 females age 18 and over, there were 93.0 males.

The median income for a household in the village was $37,404, and the median income for a family was $42,500. Males had a median income of $35,556 versus $25,278 for females. The per capita income for the village was $16,708. About 2.0% of families and 3.9% of the population were below the poverty line, including 2.9% of those under age 18 and 6.3% of those age 65 or over.
