= Rochester, Ohio =

Village in Ohio

- Village
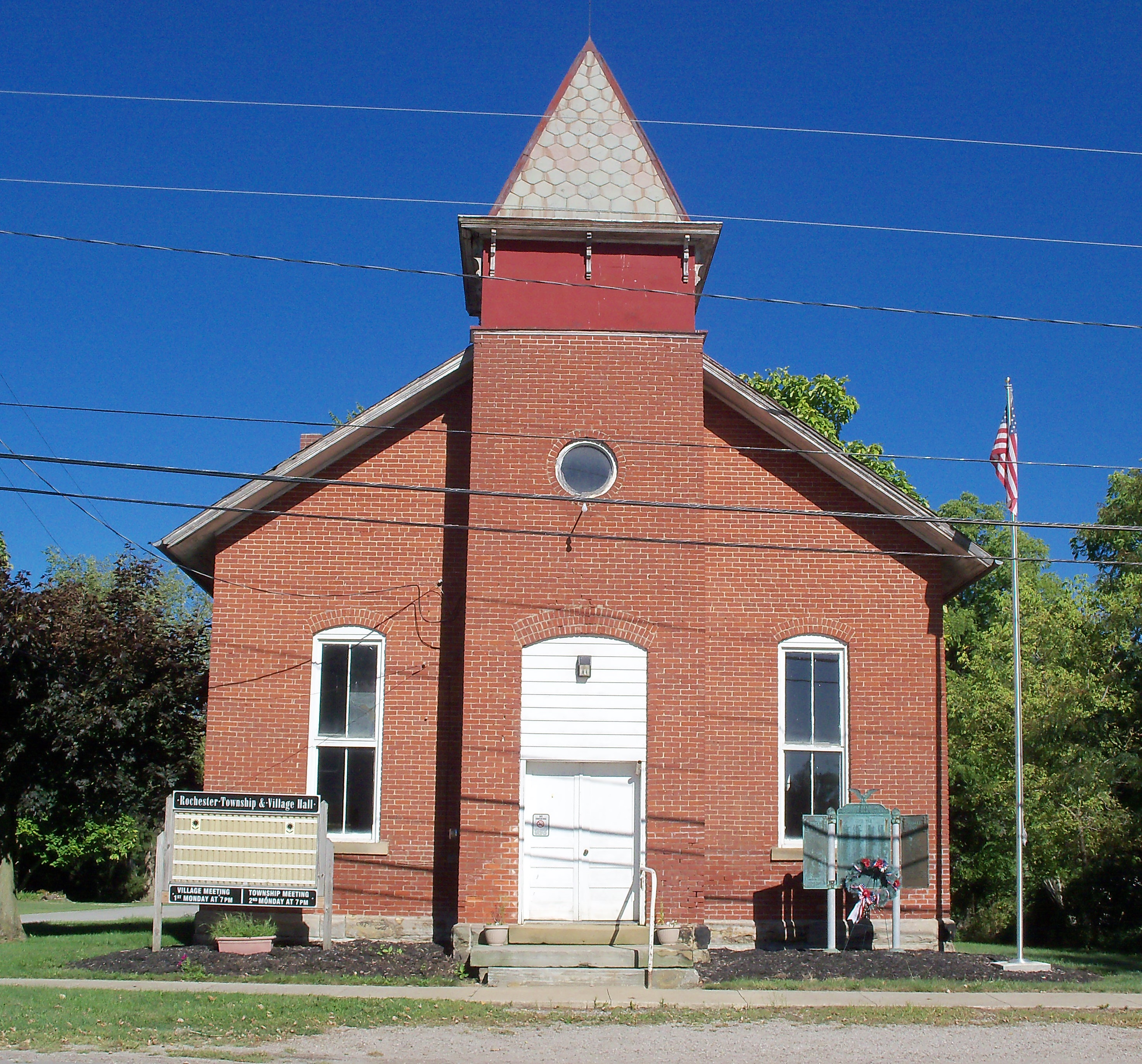
- The shared town hall and township hall for Rochester and Rochester Township

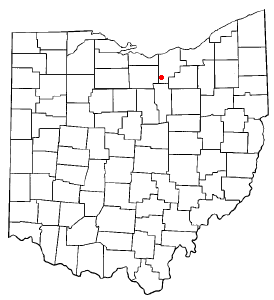
- Location of Rochester, Ohio

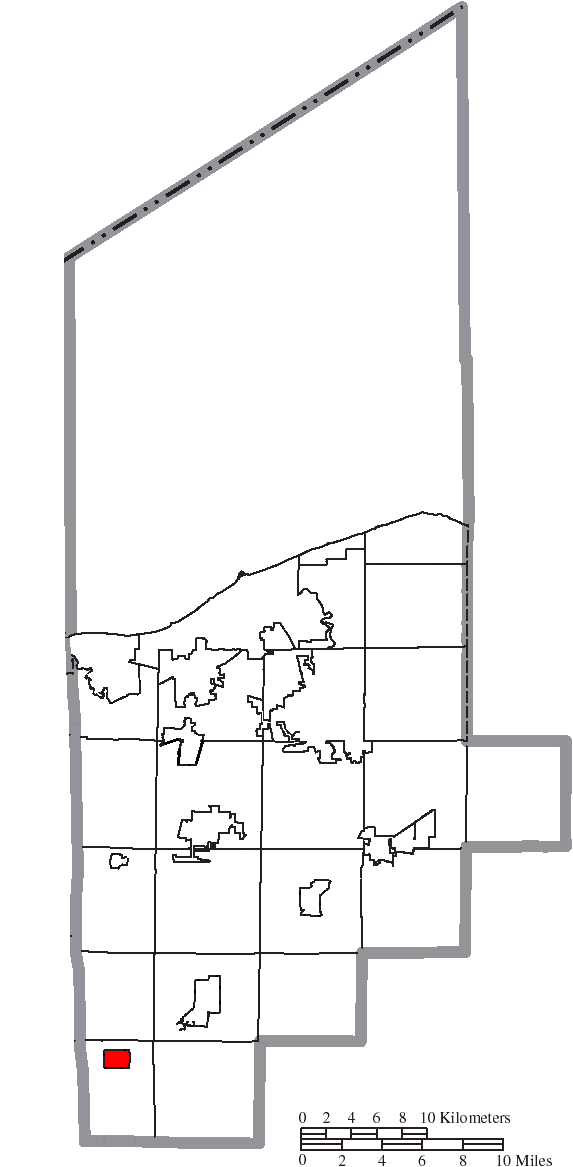
- Location of Rochester in Lorain County
- Coordinates: 41°07′34″N 82°18′21″W
- Country: United States
- State: Ohio
- County: Lorain
- Township: Rochester

Government
  - Type: Village council

Area
  - Total: 1.12 sq mi (2.91 km^{2})
  - Land: 1.12 sq mi (2.90 km^{2})
  - Water: 0.0077 sq mi (0.02 km^{2})
- Elevation: 932 ft (284 m)

Population (2020)
  - Total: 159
  - Density: 142.2/sq mi (54.91/km^{2})
- Time zone: UTC-5 (Eastern (EST))
  - Summer (DST): UTC-4 (EDT)
- ZIP code: 44090
- Area code: 440
- FIPS code: 39-67762
- GNIS feature ID: 2399099

Rochester is a village in Lorain County, Ohio, United States, along the West Branch of the Black River. The population was 159 at the 2020 census.

The village derives its name from Rochester, New York, the native home of a land agent.

== Geography ==
According to the United States Census Bureau, the village has a total area of 1.13 square miles (2.93 km^{2}), of which 1.12 square miles (2.90 km^{2}) is land and 0.01 square miles (0.03 km^{2}) is water.

== Demographics ==
Historical population
Census	Pop.	Note	%±
1880	237		—
1890	218		−8.0%
1900	167		−23.4%
1910	186		11.4%
1920	157		−15.6%
1930	164		4.5%
1940	162		−1.2%
1950	178		9.9%
1960	226		27.0%
1970	210		−7.1%
1980	207		−1.4%
1990	206		−0.5%
2000	190		−7.8%
2010	182		−4.2%
2020	159		−12.6%
U.S. Decennial Census

=== 2010 census ===
As of the census of 2010, there were 182 people, 71 households, and 54 families living in the village. The population density was 162.5 inhabitants per square mile (62.7/km^{2}). There were 80 housing units at an average density of 71.4 per square mile (27.6/km^{2}). The racial makeup of the village was 98.4% White, 0.5% Native American, and 1.1% from two or more races. Hispanic or Latino of any race were 2.2% of the population.

There were 71 households, of which 35.2% had children under the age of 18 living with them, 64.8% were married couples living together, 8.5% had a female householder with no husband present, 2.8% had a male householder with no wife present, and 23.9% were non-families. 21.1% of all households were made up of individuals, and 7% had someone living alone who was 65 years of age or older. The average household size was 2.56 and the average family size was 2.94.

The median age in the village was 41.3 years. 24.7% of residents were under the age of 18; 4.8% were between the ages of 18 and 24; 27.5% were from 25 to 44; 26.9% were from 45 to 64; and 15.9% were 65 years of age or older. The gender makeup of the village was 48.9% male and 51.1% female.

=== 2000 census ===
As of the census of 2000, there were 190 people, 68 households, and 56 families living in the village. The population density was 172.4 inhabitants per square mile (66.6/km^{2}). There were 69 housing units at an average density of 62.6 per square mile (24.2/km^{2}). The racial makeup of the village was 100.00% White.

There were 68 households, out of which 35.3% had children under the age of 18 living with them, 70.6% were married couples living together, 5.9% had a female householder with no husband present, and 17.6% were non-families. 16.2% of all households were made up of individuals, and 5.9% had someone living alone who was 65 years of age or older. The average household size was 2.79 and the average family size was 3.11.

In the village, the population was spread out, with 25.3% under the age of 18, 12.1% from 18 to 24, 27.9% from 25 to 44, 18.9% from 45 to 64, and 15.8% who were 65 years of age or older. The median age was 34 years. For every 100 females, there were 120.9 males. For every 100 females age 18 and over, there were 115.2 males.

The median income for a household in the village was $43,036, and the median income for a family was $45,000. Males had a median income of $25,500 versus $16,667 for females. The per capita income for the village was $16,193. About 1.8% of families and 7.4% of the population were below the poverty line, including 11.1% of those under the age of eighteen and 15.4% of those 65 or over.

== Notable person ==
- Bishop W. Perkins, United States Representative and Senator from Kansas.
