= National Register of Historic Places listings in Lorain County, Ohio =

Location of Lorain County in Ohio

Lorain County, Ohio, United States, has 124 properties and districts listed on the National Register of Historic Places, including three National Historic Landmarks. Another three properties were once listed, but have been removed.

The locations of National Register properties and districts for which the latitude and longitude coordinates are included below may be seen in an online map.

This National Park Service list is complete through NPS recent listings posted July 31, 2026.

== Current listings ==
| | Name on the Register | Image | Date listed | Location | City or town | Description |
|---|---|---|---|---|---|---|
| 1 | 103rd Ohio Volunteer Infantry Association Barracks | 103rd Ohio Volunteer Infantry Association Barracks | July 14, 1978 (#78002115) | 5501 E. Lake Rd. 41°30′01″N 82°04′10″W | Sheffield Lake | |
| 2 | Darlon Allen House | Darlon Allen House | June 15, 1979 (#79003877) | South of Wellington on State Route 58; 41°06′46″N 82°13′12″W | Huntington Township | |
| 3 | American Felsol Company Building | American Felsol Company Building | June 15, 2011 (#11000367) | 200 W. 9th St. 41°27′47″N 82°10′26″W | Lorain | 1909 building originally built for the Independent Order of Odd Fellows; also known as the IOOF Building and the Lorain YWCA Building |
| 4 | Amherst Town Hall | Amherst Town Hall | May 29, 1975 (#75001459) | 206 S. Main St. 41°23′54″N 82°13′38″W | Amherst | |
| 5 | Antlers Hotel | Antlers Hotel | November 30, 1982 (#82001470) | Southwestern corner of the junction of Erie and Washington Aves. 41°28′03″N 82°10′51″W | Lorain | |
| 6 | Carlos Avery House | Carlos Avery House | May 31, 1984 (#84003762) | 18797 State Route 58, north of Wellington; 41°12′33″N 82°13′08″W | Pittsfield Township | |
| 7 | Avon Isle | Avon Isle | July 8, 2010 (#10000456) | 37080 Detroit Rd. 41°27′07″N 82°02′11″W | Avon | |
| 8 | O.T. Baker House | O.T. Baker House | June 15, 1979 (#79003878) | South of Wellington on State Route 58; 41°06′26″N 82°13′13″W | Huntington Township | |
| 9 | Henry Bradford Farm | Henry Bradford Farm | September 30, 1982 (#82003608) | North of Rochester on State Route 511; 41°08′12″N 82°18′26″W | Rochester Township | |
| 10 | Justin Breckenridge House | Justin Breckenridge House | November 29, 1978 (#78002107) | 37174 S. East Main St., southeast of Grafton; 41°15′51″N 82°02′44″W | Grafton Township | |
| 11 | Broadway Building | Broadway Building | November 14, 1985 (#85002833) | Southeastern corner of W. Erie Ave. and Broadway; 41°28′06″N 82°10′40″W | Lorain | |
| 12 | Broadway Historic District | Broadway Historic District | March 16, 2022 (#100007496) | Roughly bounded by Broadway, West Erie Ave. from Washington Ave. & Erie Street Bridge, Washington Ave, Reid Ave., West 10th. West 4th, West 5th, West 6th, West 7th, West 8th, and West 9th Sts. 41°28′00″N 82°10′35″W | Lorain | |
| 13 | Brownhelm Historic District | Brownhelm Historic District | June 28, 1979 (#79003748) | Along N. Ridge Rd. in Brownhelm; 41°23′23″N 82°17′24″W | Vermilion | |
| 14 | Burrell Fort | Burrell Fort | April 4, 1978 (#78002111) | Along French Creek, ¼ mile from the Black River; 41°27′32″N 82°06′08″W | Sheffield | |
| 15 | Burrell Orchard Site | Burrell Orchard Site | September 15, 1977 (#77001073) | On a ridge off East River Road; 41°27′18″N 82°06′24″W | Sheffield | |
| 16 | Jabez and Robbins Burrell House and Cheese Factory | Jabez and Robbins Burrell House and Cheese Factory | January 1, 1976 (#76001471) | North of Lorain off State Route 301; 41°27′17″N 82°06′20″W | Sheffield | |
| 17 | Burrell-King House | Burrell-King House | March 7, 1979 (#79001886) | 317 E. College St. 41°17′27″N 82°12′21″W | Oberlin | |
| 18 | Samuel C. Cahoon House | Samuel C. Cahoon House | September 20, 1978 (#78002113) | 38369 Center Ridge Rd. 41°23′00″N 82°03′10″W | North Ridgeville | |
| 19 | Wilbur Cahoon House | Wilbur Cahoon House | April 6, 1978 (#78002104) | 2940 Stoney Ridge Rd. 41°26′50″N 82°01′58″W | Avon | |
| 20 | Patrick Carlin House | Patrick Carlin House | August 13, 1979 (#79002710) | 1182 W. River Rd., N. 41°23′19″N 82°06′18″W | Elyria | |
| 21 | Central School | Central School | November 19, 1987 (#87001985) | 474 Church St. 41°23′44″N 82°13′33″W | Amherst | |
| 22 | Century Block | Century Block | August 13, 1979 (#79002718) | Northeastern corner of Broad St. and Washington Ave. and northern side of Broad St. 41°22′04″N 82°06′22″W | Elyria | Demolished |
| 23 | John A. Chapman House | John A. Chapman House | June 15, 1979 (#79003879) | South of Wellington on State Route 58; 41°06′57″N 82°13′10″W | Huntington Township | |
| 24 | Christ Episcopal Church | Christ Episcopal Church | November 30, 1978 (#78002114) | 156 S. Main St. 41°17′15″N 82°13′05″W | Oberlin | |
| 25 | Ansel Clark House | Ansel Clark House | June 15, 1979 (#79003880) | South of Wellington on State Route 58; 41°07′13″N 82°13′12″W | Huntington Township | |
| 26 | Whitney Clark House | Whitney Clark House | June 15, 1979 (#79003881) | South of Wellington on State Route 58; 41°06′59″N 82°13′12″W | Huntington Township | |
| 27 | Columbia Baptist Church | Columbia Baptist Church | July 12, 1976 (#76001466) | 25514 Royalton Rd. 41°18′47″N 81°55′32″W | Columbia Township | |
| 28 | Columbia Town Hall | Columbia Town Hall | March 17, 1976 (#76001468) | 25496 Royalton Rd. 41°18′47″N 81°55′30″W | Columbia Township | |
| 29 | Commercial Building | Commercial Building | August 13, 1979 (#79002724) | Northeastern corner of 2nd St. and Middle Ave. 41°22′00″N 82°06′24″W | Elyria | |
| 30 | Congregational Church of Christ | Congregational Church of Christ | August 13, 1974 (#74001554) | W. Lorain and N. Main Sts. 41°17′40″N 82°13′06″W | Oberlin | |
| 31 | Dean Road Bridge | Dean Road Bridge | November 28, 1978 (#78002119) | West of South Amherst at Dean Rd. and the Vermilion River; 41°20′56″N 82°20′41″W | Henrietta Township | Extends into Erie County |
| 32 | Downtown Oberlin Historic District | Downtown Oberlin Historic District | May 1, 2003 (#03000324) | Roughly includes W. and E. College St., within 1 block of S. Main and S. Main from College to approximately Vine St. 41°17′25″N 82°13′05″W | Oberlin | |
| 33 | Duane Block | Duane Block | July 16, 1987 (#87001248) | 387-401 Broadway; 41°28′03″N 82°10′36″W | Lorain | |
| 34 | Eagles Building | Eagles Building | April 24, 1986 (#86000850) | 575 Broadway; 41°27′58″N 82°10′30″W | Lorain | Located on the east (right) side of Broadway, it has a tall-white facade. |
| 35 | Eiden Prehistoric District | Eiden Prehistoric District | November 21, 1978 (#78002112) | 0.8 km north of the confluence of the Black River and French Creek; 41°27′52″N 82°06′45″W | Sheffield | |
| 36 | Ely Block | Ely Block | August 13, 1979 (#79002717) | Northern side of Broad St. between Washington and East Ave. 41°22′04″N 82°06′26″W | Elyria | |
| 37 | Elyria Downtown-West Avenue Historic District | Elyria Downtown-West Avenue Historic District | January 16, 2001 (#00001663) | Roughly bounded by Railroad, East Ave., 5th St., and West Ave. 41°21′55″N 82°06′26″W | Elyria | |
| 38 | Elyria Elks Club | Elyria Elks Club | August 13, 1979 (#79002726) | 246 2nd St. 41°21′59″N 82°06′22″W | Elyria | |
| 39 | Elyria High School - Washington Building | Elyria High School - Washington Building | August 13, 1979 (#79002735) | Southwestern corner of 6th St. and Middle Ave. 41°21′43″N 82°06′28″W | Elyria | |
| 40 | Wilson Bruce Evans House | Wilson Bruce Evans House | April 16, 1980 (#80003143) | 33 E. Vine St. 41°17′19″N 82°12′59″W | Oberlin | |
| 41 | First Church of Christ, Scientist | First Church of Christ, Scientist | July 18, 1975 (#75001460) | 309 East Ave. 41°21′53″N 82°06′16″W | Elyria | |
| 42 | First National Bank Building | First National Bank Building | August 13, 1979 (#79002719) | Broad St. 41°22′04″N 82°06′19″W | Elyria | |
| 43 | First United Methodist Church | First United Methodist Church | August 13, 1979 (#79002730) | 312 3rd St. 41°21′55″N 82°06′29″W | Elyria | |
| 44 | Halsey Garfield House | Halsey Garfield House | May 22, 1978 (#78002116) | 4789 Detroit Rd. 41°25′19″N 82°05′35″W | Sheffield | |
| 45 | Milton Garfield House | Milton Garfield House | September 21, 1978 (#78002117) | 4921 Detroit Rd. 41°25′22″N 82°05′22″W | Sheffield | |
| 46 | Arthur L. Garford House | Arthur L. Garford House | December 30, 1974 (#74001551) | 509 Washington Ave. 41°22′28″N 82°06′21″W | Elyria | |
| 47 | Gould Block | Gould Block | February 9, 2005 (#05000031) | 608-630 Broadway Ave. 41°27′56″N 82°10′31″W | Lorain | |
| 48 | Grafton School | Grafton School | February 21, 2008 (#08000117) | 1111 Elm St. 41°16′33″N 82°03′03″W | Grafton | |
| 49 | Gregg House | Gregg House | June 15, 1979 (#79003882) | South of Wellington on State Route 58; 41°06′21″N 82°13′13″W | Huntington Township | Photo is not of the Gregg House. See the Ohio MPS Gregg House nomination form for the correct house photo. Google Street View shows the house with the small upper front windows sided over. |
| 50 | Gunn House | Gunn House | June 15, 1979 (#79003883) | South of Wellington on State Route 58; 41°08′27″N 82°13′08″W | Wellington Township | |
| 51 | Huntington Grange | Huntington Grange | June 15, 1979 (#79003884) | South of Wellington at the junction of State Routes 58 and 162; 41°06′03″N 82°13′11″W | Huntington Township | |
| 52 | Huntington Public School | Huntington Public School | June 15, 1979 (#79003885) | South of Wellington at junction of State Routes 58 and 162; 41°06′01″N 82°13′11″W | Huntington Township | |
| 53 | Huntington Township Hall | Huntington Township Hall | June 15, 1979 (#79003886) | South of Wellington on State Route 58; 41°05′59″N 82°13′12″W | Huntington Township | |
| 54 | William E. Hurst House | William E. Hurst House | September 11, 1974 (#74001550) | 33065 Detroit Ave. 41°27′12″N 81°59′07″W | Avon | |
| 55 | Immaculate Conception Church | Immaculate Conception Church | March 16, 1976 (#76001469) | 708 Erie St. 41°16′37″N 82°03′36″W | Grafton | |
| 56 | Frank Jewett House | Frank Jewett House | July 24, 1979 (#79001887) | 73 S. Professor St. 41°17′23″N 82°13′11″W | Oberlin | |
| 57 | Johnson Steel Street Railway Company General Offices Building | Johnson Steel Street Railway Company General Offices Building | July 16, 1992 (#92000887) | 1807 E. 28th St. 41°26′45″N 82°08′11″W | Lorain | |
| 58 | E.J. Johnson House | E.J. Johnson House | August 13, 1979 (#79002737) | Middle Ave. and 8th St. 41°21′35″N 82°06′25″W | Elyria | |
| 59 | John Mercer Langston House | John Mercer Langston House | May 15, 1975 (#75001464) | 207 E. College St. 41°17′28″N 82°12′36″W | Oberlin | |
| 60 | Thomas W. Laundon House | Thomas W. Laundon House | October 21, 1975 (#75001462) | 307 West Ave. 41°21′54″N 82°06′39″W | Elyria | |
| 61 | John Lersch House | John Lersch House | August 13, 1979 (#79002711) | 121 Harrison St. 41°22′21″N 82°06′20″W | Elyria | |
| 62 | Lorain Carnegie Public Library | Lorain Carnegie Public Library | June 26, 2023 (#100009060) | 329 West 10th St. 41°27′39″N 82°10′30″W | Lorain | |
| 63 | Lorain County Courthouse | Lorain County Courthouse | June 18, 1975 (#75001463) | 308 2nd St. 41°21′57″N 82°06′27″W | Elyria | |
| 64 | Lorain Fire Station No. 1 | Lorain Fire Station No. 1 | August 20, 1987 (#87001374) | 605 W. 4th St. 41°28′00″N 82°10′47″W | Lorain | |
| 65 | Lorain Lighthouse | Lorain Lighthouse | December 29, 1978 (#78002108) | Lorain Harbor; 41°28′38″N 82°11′25″W | Lorain | |
| 66 | Lorain YMCA Building | Lorain YMCA Building | July 16, 1992 (#92000886) | Junction of E. 28th St. and Pearl Ave. 41°26′45″N 82°08′17″W | Lorain | |
| 67 | Addison Lord House | Addison Lord House | December 9, 1999 (#99001497) | 315 West Ave. 41°21′53″N 82°06′39″W | Elyria | |
| 68 | The Mill Hollow House | The Mill Hollow House | June 29, 1976 (#76001472) | Southeast of Vermilion on N. Ridge Rd. 41°22′55″N 82°18′54″W | Brownhelm Township | |
| 69 | Peter Miller House | Peter Miller House | August 25, 1978 (#78002106) | 33740 Lake Rd. 41°30′08″N 82°03′36″W | Avon Lake | |
| 70 | Monteith Hall | Monteith Hall | October 9, 1974 (#74001552) | 218 East Ave. 41°21′56″N 82°06′14″W | Elyria | |
| 71 | Leonard M. Moore House | Leonard M. Moore House | December 30, 1993 (#93001439) | 309 5th St. 41°27′57″N 82°10′41″W | Lorain | |
| 72 | Morris-Franks Site | Morris-Franks Site | September 5, 1975 (#75001465) | Between Vermilion Rd. and the Black River, southeast of central Vermilion; 41°24′33″N 82°20′04″W | Vermilion | |
| 73 | Mosher House | Mosher House | June 15, 1979 (#79003887) | South of Wellington on State Route 58; 41°09′13″N 82°13′03″W | Wellington Township | |
| 74 | New York Central Freight House | New York Central Freight House | June 1, 1982 (#82003605) | 412 E. River St. 41°22′11″N 82°05′46″W | Elyria | |
| 75 | Walter Nichols House | Walter Nichols House | August 13, 1979 (#79002733) | Southeastern corner of 4th St. and West Ave. 41°21′50″N 82°06′36″W | Elyria | |
| 76 | Nimocks House | Nimocks House | June 15, 1979 (#79003888) | South of Wellington on State Route 58; 41°05′35″N 82°13′13″W | Huntington Township | |
| 77 | William Nooney House | William Nooney House | June 15, 1979 (#79003889) | South of Wellington on State Route 58; 41°06′29″N 82°13′13″W | Huntington Township | |
| 78 | North Ridgeville Town Hall | North Ridgeville Town Hall | December 30, 1974 (#74001553) | 36119 Center Ridge Rd; 41°23′20″N 82°01′14″W | North Ridgeville | |
| 79 | Oberlin College | Oberlin College | October 15, 1966 (#66000615) | Tappan Sq. 41°17′34″N 82°13′08″W | Oberlin | |
| 80 | Oberlin Gas Lighting Company Gasholder House | Oberlin Gas Lighting Company Gasholder House | November 19, 1998 (#98001397) | 291 S. Main St. 41°17′03″N 82°12′58″W | Oberlin | |
| 81 | Oberlin Lake Shore And Michigan Southern Station | Oberlin Lake Shore And Michigan Southern Station | March 2, 1979 (#79001888) | Depot Park; 41°17′04″N 82°13′08″W | Oberlin | |
| 82 | Old Amherst Freight Depot | Old Amherst Freight Depot | November 21, 1978 (#78002103) | Franklin St. 41°23′42″N 82°13′08″W | Amherst | |
| 83 | Old Baptist Parsonage | Old Baptist Parsonage | June 15, 1979 (#79003890) | South of Wellington on State Route 58; 41°06′12″N 82°13′14″W | Huntington Township | |
| 84 | Old City Hall | Old City Hall | August 13, 1979 (#79002725) | Court St. facing Elyria Square; 41°22′01″N 82°06′29″W | Elyria | |
| 85 | Old Elyria Water Tower | Old Elyria Water Tower | August 13, 1979 (#79002739) | Southern side of W. 15th St., 100 ft (30 m) west of Black River Bridge; 41°21′09″N 82°06′54″W | Elyria | |
| 86 | Old Huntington Inn | Old Huntington Inn | June 15, 1979 (#79003891) | South of Wellington at the junction of State Routes 58 and 162; 41°06′04″N 82°13′14″W | Huntington Township | |
| 87 | Old Methodist Parsonage | Old Methodist Parsonage | June 15, 1979 (#79003892) | South of Wellington on State Route 58; 41°06′21″N 82°13′13″W | Huntington Township | |
| 88 | Old Railroad Station | Old Railroad Station | August 13, 1979 (#79002714) | 49 East Ave. 41°22′06″N 82°06′13″W | Elyria | |
| 89 | Old St. Patrick's Church | Old St. Patrick's Church | March 21, 1979 (#79001890) | 512 N. Main St. 41°10′27″N 82°13′00″W | Wellington | |
| 90 | Palace Theatre Building | Palace Theatre Building | March 30, 1978 (#78002109) | Broadway and 6th St. 41°27′57″N 82°10′30″W | Lorain | Lorain Palace Theatre |
| 91 | Reamer Barn | Reamer Barn | March 21, 1979 (#79001889) | Southern side of State Route 511, east of Quarry Rd. and west of Oberlin; 41°17′38″N 82°14′42″W | New Russia Township | |
| 92 | Redington Block | Redington Block | August 13, 1979 (#79002723) | Eastern side of Middle Ave. between Broad and 2nd Sts., second building from Ind. St. 41°22′01″N 82°06′24″W | Elyria | |
| 93 | Frederick Reefy House | Frederick Reefy House | August 13, 1979 (#79002729) | 3rd St. between West Ave. and Court St. 41°21′55″N 82°06′35″W | Elyria | |
| 94 | Robinson Building | | June 6, 2022 (#100007765) | 401-415 Broad St. 41°22′04″N 82°06′24″W | Elyria | |
| 95 | William H. Root House | William H. Root House | September 20, 1978 (#78002110) | 3535 E. Erie Ave. 41°29′04″N 82°07′52″W | Lorain | |
| 96 | Sage House | Sage House | June 15, 1979 (#79003893) | South of Wellington on State Route 58; 41°06′23″N 82°13′12″W | Huntington Township | |
| 97 | St. Andrew's Episcopal Church | St. Andrew's Episcopal Church | August 13, 1979 (#79002731) | 300 3rd St. 41°21′54″N 82°06′26″W | Elyria | |
| 98 | St. Ladislaus Roman Catholic Church | St. Ladislaus Roman Catholic Church | April 1, 1982 (#82003607) | 2908 Wood Ave. 41°26′39″N 82°09′00″W | Lorain | |
| 99 | St. Mary's Catholic School | St. Mary's Catholic School | August 13, 1979 (#79002734) | 320 Middle Ave. 41°21′52″N 82°06′22″W | Elyria | |
| 100 | St. Mary's Roman Catholic Church | St. Mary's Roman Catholic Church | August 13, 1979 (#79002732) | 320 Middle Ave. 41°21′52″N 82°06′24″W | Elyria | |
| 101 | William Seher House | William Seher House | June 17, 1976 (#76001470) | 329 W. 9th St. 41°27′42″N 82°10′33″W | Lorain | |
| 102 | Sheffield Village Hall | Sheffield Village Hall | October 5, 1978 (#78002118) | Detroit Rd. 41°25′17″N 82°05′34″W | Sheffield | |
| 103 | John J. Shipherd House | John J. Shipherd House | August 13, 1979 (#79002736) | Northwestern corner of East Ave. and 8th St. 41°21′36″N 82°06′16″W | Elyria | |
| 104 | Charles William and Anna Smith House | Charles William and Anna Smith House | January 25, 1997 (#96001623) | 651 W. Broad St. 41°22′05″N 82°06′43″W | Elyria | |
| 105 | Soldiers and Sailors Monument | Soldiers and Sailors Monument | August 13, 1979 (#79002722) | Elyria Square (Downtown); 41°22′03″N 82°06′27″W | Elyria | |
| 106 | South Ridge Schoolhouse | South Ridge Schoolhouse | August 8, 1985 (#85001692) | State Route 113 and Bechtel Rd. 41°22′11″N 82°10′32″W | Amherst Township | |
| 107 | Sprague House | Sprague House | June 15, 1979 (#79003894) | South of Wellington at the junction of State Route 58 and Jones Rd. 41°08′48″N 82°13′06″W | Wellington Township | |
| 108 | Horace C. Starr House and Carriage Barns | Horace C. Starr House and Carriage Barns | April 3, 1979 (#79001885) | 276 Washington Ave. 41°22′16″N 82°06′25″W | Elyria | |
| 109 | U.S. Post Office | U.S. Post Office | August 13, 1979 (#79002720) | 281 Broad St. 41°22′04″N 82°06′13″W | Elyria | |
| 110 | U.S. Post Office | U.S. Post Office | December 9, 1982 (#82001471) | 9th St. and Broadway Ave. 41°27′48″N 82°10′22″W | Lorain | |
| 111 | Union Church | Union Church | March 15, 1982 (#82003606) | 511 Church St. 41°15′56″N 82°18′15″W | Kipton | |
| 112 | United Church of Huntington | United Church of Huntington | June 15, 1979 (#79003895) | South of Wellington on State Route 58; 41°06′19″N 82°13′11″W | Huntington Township | |
| 113 | Benjamin Wadsworth House | Benjamin Wadsworth House | June 15, 1979 (#79003896) | South of Wellington on State Route 58; 41°08′09″N 82°13′11″W | Huntington Township | |
| 114 | Washington Avenue Historic District | Washington Avenue Historic District | August 20, 1987 (#87001376) | Roughly Ohio, Columbus, Harrison, and Saint Clair Sts. between Washington Ave. and Glenwood St. 41°22′27″N 82°06′13″W | Elyria | |
| 115 | Washington Terrace Apartments | Washington Terrace Apartments | August 13, 1979 (#79002713) | Washington Ave. 41°22′10″N 82°06′25″W | Elyria | |
| 116 | A.R. Webber House | A.R. Webber House | August 13, 1979 (#79002712) | 251 Washington Ave. 41°22′13″N 82°06′21″W | Elyria | |
| 117 | Wellington Center Historic District | Wellington Center Historic District | November 21, 1974 (#74001556) | Main St. and Herrick Ave. 41°10′07″N 82°13′03″W | Wellington | |
| 118 | Wellington Historic District | Wellington Historic District | May 30, 1979 (#79001891) | Irregular pattern along Main St. from Kelley St. to the former Wheeling & Lake Erie railroad line 41°09′52″N 82°13′03″W | Wellington and Wellington Township | |
| 119 | West House | West House | June 15, 1979 (#79003897) | South of Wellington on State Route 58; 41°05′14″N 82°13′13″W | Huntington Township | |
| 120 | Westervelt Hall | Westervelt Hall | May 3, 1974 (#74001555) | 39 S. Main St. 41°17′26″N 82°13′01″W | Oberlin | |
| 121 | J.B. Wilber House | J.B. Wilber House | June 15, 1979 (#79003898) | South of Wellington on State Route 58; 41°07′48″N 82°13′11″W | Huntington Township | |
| 122 | Henry Harrison Williams House | Henry Harrison Williams House | July 12, 1978 (#78002105) | 37392 Detroit Rd. 41°26′58″N 82°02′18″W | Avon | |
| 123 | Wilson-Falkner-Baldauf House | Wilson-Falkner-Baldauf House | May 21, 2010 (#10000278) | 3260 Center Rd. 41°26′26″N 82°01′11″W | Avon | |
| 124 | Wooster Block | Wooster Block | August 13, 1979 (#79002716) | Northern side of Broad St. between Lodi St. and Washington Ave. 41°22′05″N 82°06′30″W | Elyria | Demolished |

== Former listings ==
| | Name on the Register | Image | Date listed | Date removed | Location | City or town | Description |
|---|---|---|---|---|---|---|---|
| 1 | George Bryant House | George Bryant House | August 13, 1979 (#79002727) | May 12, 2016 | 333 3rd St. 41°21′56″N 82°06′33″W | Elyria | |
| 2 | Old District Nine Schoolhouse | Old District Nine Schoolhouse | August 13, 1979 (#79002715) | May 12, 2016 | Chestnut St. 41°22′06″N 82°06′44″W | Elyria | |
| 3 | Old St. John's Church | Old St. John's Church | August 13, 1979 (#79002721) | May 12, 2016 | 600 W. Broad St. 41°22′03″N 82°06′38″W | Elyria | |

== See also ==
- List of National Historic Landmarks in Ohio
- Listings in neighboring counties: Ashland, Cuyahoga, Erie, Huron, Medina
- National Register of Historic Places listings in Ohio
