= Avery House =

Avery House may refer to:

- Avery House, a dormitory within the House System at the California Institute of Technology
- Avery House (Fort Collins, Colorado), a National Register of Historic Places listing in Larimer County, Colorado
- Avery House (Griswold, Connecticut)
- Ebenezer Avery House, a historic house museum in Fort Griswold Battlefield State Park
- Thomas Avery House, East Lyme, Connecticut
- Capt. Salem Avery House, Shady Side, Maryland
- Alphonse Calhoun Avery House, Morganton, North Carolina
- Carlos Avery House, Wellington, Ohio
- Avery House (Dayton, Oregon), a National Register of Historic Places listing in Yamhill County, Oregon
- Avery House (Frankfort, Indiana), an Indiana Register of Historic Sites and Structures listing in Frankfort, Indiana

== See also ==
- Avery Homestead, Ledyard, Connecticut
- Avery Farmhouse, Duanesburg, New York
- Avery-Hunter House, Granville, Ohio
