= Lorain County Transit =

Public transit system in Ohio, US

- Founded: 1974
- Headquarters: 40 East Avenue; Elyria, Ohio
- Service area: Lorain County, Ohio, United States
- Service type: Bus service, demand responsive transport, microtransit, paratransit
- Routes: 4
- Hubs: Downtown Commons, Lorain; Black River Career Prep High School, Elyria; Lorain County Transportation Center, Elyria (Planned; future)
- Annual ridership: 30,271 (2016; fixed route); 150,000 (2026, Via LC)
- Operator: Transdev (All other services); Via Transportation (Microtransit service only)
- Manager: Kirt Conrad
- Website: Official website

Lorain County Transit (LCT) is a public transit system serving Lorain County, Ohio, United States. A division of the Lorain County Commissioners, LCT currently operates local service within the county consisting primarily of demand-responsive service and paratransit, along with a few fixed bus routes. The headquarters are located in Lorain County's county seat in Elyria.

== History ==
In 1974, then-Lorain County board chairman, Robert Wickens successfully led the effort to launch public transit service within the locale of Lorain County, Ohio. Lorain County Transit was first launched with dial-a-ride demand-responsive transit and fixed routes serving several communities in Lorain County. The majority of the routes served an established terminal as a transfer point adjacent to Midway Mall in Elyria. A secondary terminus for some of the routes was established near a shopping plaza in downtown Lorain, then known as Meridian Plaza. Between 1986 and 1992, LCT was faced with a great increase in ridership, following the launch of the routes. LCT eventually launched the Cleveland Link route, an express bus route from downtown Oberlin to Cleveland Hopkins International Airport which also included an intermediate stop at a park and ride lot in Elyria, and to allow riders to connect to the GCRTA Rapid's Red Line.

In late 2000, LCT began restructuring and launching several new fixed bus routes across several municipalities throughout Lorain County. LCT also began operating a few inter-county bus routes providing connections to the GCRTA bus system; the Cleveland Link route was designated as "Route 33"; LCT also provided a weekday-only peak-hour express bus route from Elyria to the GCRTA park and ride lot in Westlake, designated as "Route 70"; a local route designated as "Route 11" also operated from Elyria to an GCRTA bus stop at the Lorain Country line in North Olmsted via North Ridgeville, providing connections to RTA bus routes for continued service into the Cleveland area. Around the mid-2000s, LCT also began launching connecting demand-responsive "Community Connector" service, which allowed riders to provide in-demand door-to-door service and to connect to and from the fixed route network; this service served the municipalities of Oberlin, Amherst, South Amherst, Avon, and Avon Lake.

In August 2006, LCT announced that the bus routes would no longer operate as a flag stop service citing safety concerns and issues of route service presence awareness. Designated bus stop signs on each of the active routes were installed.

On June 1, 2009, the Lorain County Commissioners had approved $300,000 in service reductions as a result of funding shortfalls and economical struggles. Around the same time, LCT discontinued the 33 and 70 routes, discontinued service running on Sunday, and cut several trips on the existing routes. On December 31 of the same year, LCT suspended service systemwide, and on January 14, 2010, LCT discontinued 8 of the existing fixed routes due to funding issues, following a failed tax levy. At the same, LCT combined 4 routes into 2 combined routes; routes 1 and 51, and 2 and 52, respectively, leaving the system with only 4 routes, along with Dial-A-Ride paratransit service, and demand-responsive service serving Oberlin; all of which operate only on weekdays.

On September 10, 2012, LCT launched a weekday-only Cleveland Commuter express route from Elyria to Downtown Cleveland, but was later discontinued on August 16, 2013 due to low ridership.

In 2017, Northeast Ohio Areawide Coordinating Agency awarded funds to LCT to develop a plan for service evaluations to help increase ridership awareness and improve marketing. In November and December of the same year, LCT held public meetings in Elyria for local residents of a proposed new redevelopment plan, but the plans have not come to fruition. In 2018, LCT launched the Downtown Elyria Loop.

In July 2024, LCT launched "ViaLC", a demand-response microtransit service under partnership with Via Transportation providing service within Elyria and Lorain. On December 18, 2025, LCT received a federal grant of $2.7 million for transit expansion; officials have currently planned to expand service hours on the microtransit service and resurrect weekend service.

On May 20 & 21, 2026, LCT held public hearings to discontinue the Downtown Elyria Loop as a result of low ridership, in favor of allocating service to Dial-A-Ride operations. LCT also held a public presentation on the 22nd of the same month on future expansions and developments of proposed new routes and Dial-A-Ride improvements. The 4 routes (1, 2, 51, 52) are planned to be discontinued in 2027 in favor of new routes serving Elyria and Lorain, along with one to serve Lorain County Community College. In the medium term, LCT is planning to launch new routes serving Avon and North Ridgeville, one of which would provide service into Cuyahoga County to provide a connection with the Greater Cleveland RTA system, along with an additional circulator route in Elyria. With adequate funding allocated in the long-term, an additional local bus route between Elyria and Oberlin is proposed to be implemented in at least 2030. On June 30, 2026, LCT discontinued the Downtown Elyria Loop due to low ridership.

== Other services ==
In addition with the fixed routes, LCT also operates a "Dial-A-Ride" demand-response and paratransit service across the entire Lorain County region, along with an "Oberlin Connector" service; the latter of which is required to have their trips begin and/or end within Oberlin's city limits, providing service to and from the neighboring municipalities of Elyria, Lorain, Amherst, and Sheffield. LCT also operates in-demand microtransit service under partnership with Via Transportation providing service within Elyria and Lorain. Both ViaLC and Dial-A-Ride currently operate on weekdays from 6 AM to 6 PM.

== Fares ==
Oberlin Connector, ViaLC, and all fixed routes cost $2 for a one-way trip. Dial-A-Ride paratransit service costs $9 one way. Seniors, children 3 through 12, and disabled can receive a discount of $1, while veterans and children 2 and under can ride for free. Transfer tickets are available upon request for free to allow riders to transfer to and from another route or Via LC. Monthly and all-day passes along with 10-trip tickets are also available.

Riders on fixed routes, Oberlin Connector, and Dial-A-Ride must provide exact change in cash upon boarding, while ViaLC accepts cash, credit, and debit.

== Routes ==
As of June 2026, LCT currently operates 4 fixed routes bi-hourly between early morning until early evening hours on weekdays. Each route is based on a transfer point at the Black River Career Prep High School parking lot in Elyria. The routes are planned to be replaced by two new additional routes serving Elyria and Lorain in at least 2027, both of which would operate hourly.

Route		Terminals	Notes / Points of Interest
1	Lorain/Elyria via Washington	Black River Career Prep High School, Elyria; Downtown Commons, Lorain (as "Meridian Plaza"; routes 1 & 2 only); West 5th Street & Reid Avenue	Interlines with Route 51; Serves Sheffield Center and Lorain County Job & Family Services; Discontinuation planned for 2027 due to proposed LCT fixed route service redevelopment
2	Lorain/Elyria via Broadway	Black River Career Prep High School, Elyria; Downtown Commons, Lorain (as "Meridian Plaza"; routes 1 & 2 only); West 5th Street & Reid Avenue	Interlines with Route 52; Request deviations - Sacred Heart Manor apartment complex; Lorain County Health & Dentistry in Lorain; Formerly provided limited weekday service to Midway Mall; Planned to be replaced by new Lorain-Elyria route in 2027 due to proposed LCT fixed route service redevelopment
51	East Elyria/Broad Street Loop	Black River Career Prep High School, Elyria; Downtown Commons, Lorain (as "Meridian Plaza"; routes 1 & 2 only); West 5th Street & Reid Avenue	Interlines with Route 1; Serves Lorain County Community College and the Lorain County Transportation Center; Request deviations - corner of Bell Avenue & Furnace Street, Cobblestone Square, and Schadden Road; Formerly provided service to Midway Mall; Planned to be replaced by new bidirectional circulator route in 2027 due to proposed LCT fixed route service redevelopment
52	East Elyria/Abbe Road Loop	Black River Career Prep High School, Elyria; Downtown Commons, Lorain (as "Meridian Plaza"; routes 1 & 2 only); West 5th Street & Reid Avenue	Interlines with Route 2; Request deviations - Taylor Woods Industrial Park; Ternes & Teaser Industrial Parks Complex; Chestnut Commons; Sugar Lane/Sullinger Industrial Park Complex; Fresenius Medical Care Heritage; Colonial Oaks mobile home park; Serves Midway Mall; Discontinuation planned for 2027 due to proposed LCT fixed route service redevelopment

== See also ==
- List of bus transit systems in the United States
