= Beaver Creek (Lorain County, Ohio) =

Large creek in Ohio, US

Coordinates: 41.4370°N 82.2524°W

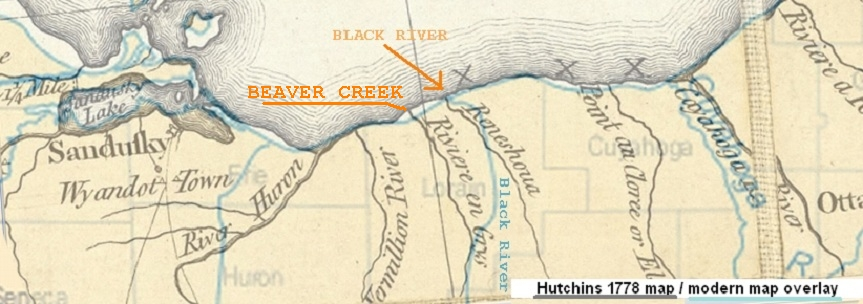

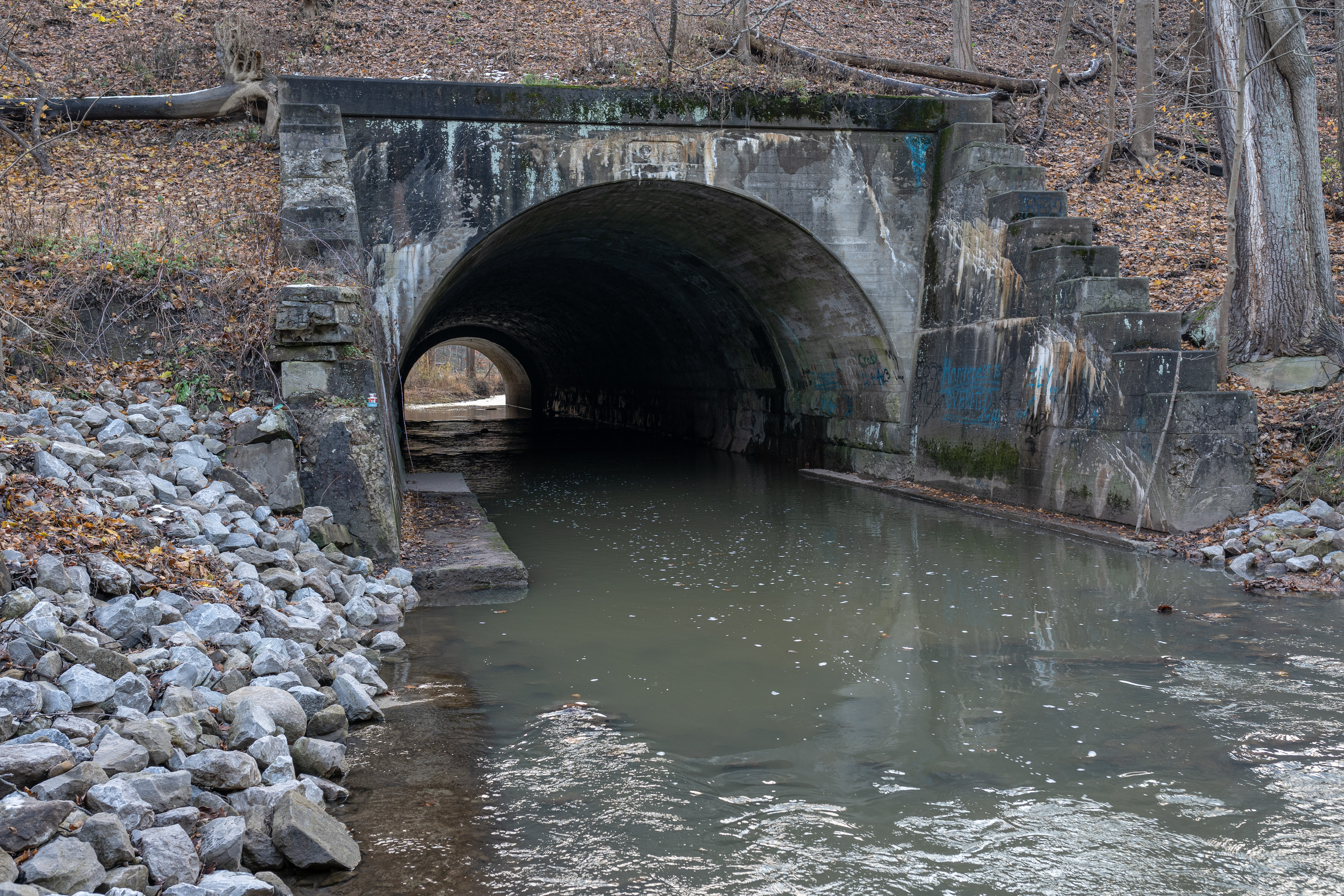
Beaver Creek passing under the tunnel and rail tracks by the old spring in downtown Amherst, Ohio

Beaver Creek is a large creek in Lorain County, Ohio, USA. It flows through the township (and the village) of Amherst, and through the western end of the corporation-limits of the City of Lorain, and into Lake Erie.

- The entire Beaver Creek watershed is composed of two main branches (originally called "Big Beaver" and "Little Beaver"), and several small tributaries.
- The area at the mouth/outlet of this creek has been historically known as "Oak Point". [The extensive sand beach to the immediate west of the mouth, has been called "Hole-in-the-Wall" — named for the former access routes onto the beach, via a bygone passageway there through the railroad-embankment — and also via an existing legal-right-of-way through the "Claus double-tunnel" at Quarry Creek, although presently the "Hole-in-the-Wall" beach no longer extends that far westerly. (There have been unsuccessful past local-governmental proposals to restore the whole length of the Hole-in-the-Wall beach, and re-open that "Claus double-tunnel" to the public.) ]
- Beaver Creek has an important history in the early pioneer-settlement of this land-area of Ohio ( including the "Beaver Creek Settlement" of 1810, and, in particular, the later development of the village of Amherst. In fact, those same pioneer-settlers are said to have named this creek solely in honor of their former homeland in western Pennsylvania, ( and therefore it is uncertain if there were also a significant number of beaver inhabiting this creek, which some local-historians have later asserted).
- Prior to the arrival of the pioneer-settlers from their former Beaver Falls (PA) area, this creek seems to have been known as the "Riviere en Grys".
- Beaver Creek's main branch follows these basic co-ordinates: 41.2814393 -82.2882163 / 41.3750450 -82.2393232 / 41.4361526 -82.2498785

== See also ==
- List of rivers of Ohio
