= Oberlin station =

- Oberlin Lake Shore And Michigan Southern Station
- U.S. National Register of Historic Places
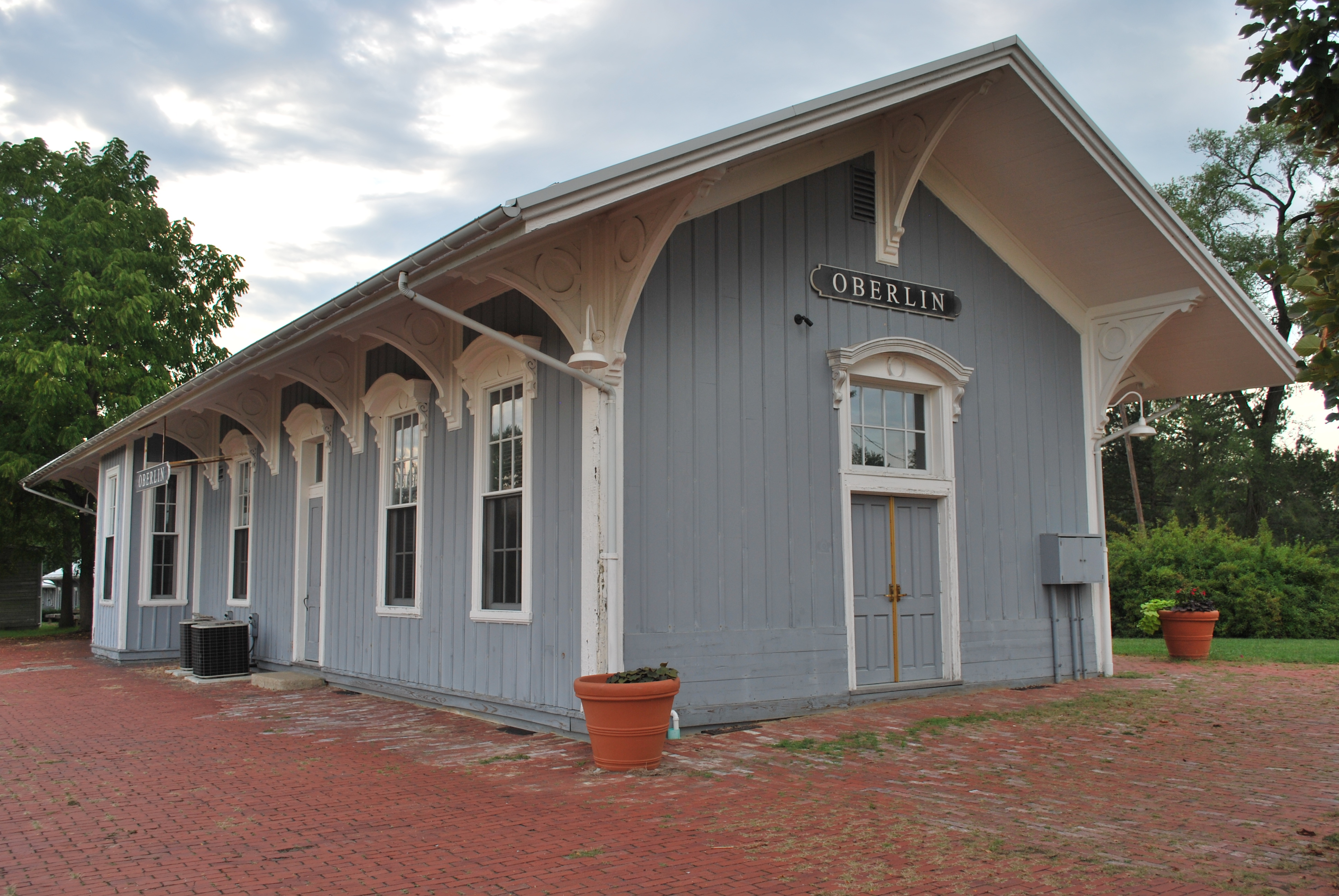
- Eastern end and southern side

- Location within Ohio Location within the United States
- Location: Depot Park, Oberlin, Ohio
- Coordinates: 41°17′4.5″N 82°13′7″W
- Area: 3 acres (1.2 ha)
- Built: 1867
- Architectural style: Italianate, Gothic Revival
- NRHP reference No.: 79001888
- Added to NRHP: March 2, 1979

Oberlin is a historic former train station in the city of Oberlin, Ohio, United States. Constructed shortly after the American Civil War, it has become an example of adaptive reuse, and it has been named a historic site.

The depot is a simple weatherboarded structure with a foundation of sandstone, designed in a mixture of the Gothic Revival and Italianate styles of architecture. It exemplifies train stations constructed during the middle of the 19th century: northern Ohio's earliest stations were often built in a form of Gothic Revival, while Italianate styling became much more popular following the conclusion of the Civil War in 1865. Few depots with this mix of styles survive, especially in Lorain County.

Oberlin's first railroad was built by the Toledo, Norwalk, and Cleveland Railroad, which opened its line through the village in late 1852. Fifteen years later, the Lake Shore and Michigan Southern Railroad erected the present structure along its east-west line on Oberlin's southern side. From its earliest years, the rail line was a highly significant component of village life: Oberlin College students and other travellers had previously relied on weather-dependent Lake Erie transportation routes, so the all-weather railroad line provided an immense boost to the college and to the community in general. In 1914, the LS&MS became a part of the new New York Central Railroad, but the new larger railroad only operated the depot for a few decades; by the 1970s, the depot sat silent and unused. Rather than demolishing the depot, locals chose to preserve it: the land surrounding it was converted into a park, and the depot itself was renovated in order to ready it for use as the local Head Start offices.

In 1979, the depot was listed on the National Register of Historic Places as the Oberlin Lake Shore And Michigan Southern Station, qualifying both because of its architecture and its place in local history. Some changes were made when the depot was renovated for Head Start, but it retains its original appearance, aside from the absence of the rails that once sat next to it. As one of the area's least-changed historic railroad stations, it was deemed an important example of railroads' changing architectural styles during the mid-19th century. It is one of twelve National Register-listed locations in and around Oberlin, and one of more than a hundred countywide.

| Preceding station | New York Central Railroad | Following station |
|---|---|---|
| Kipton toward Millbury Junction | Norwalk Branch | Elyria Terminus |
