= John Mercer Langston House =

Historic house in Ohio, United States

- U.S. National Register of Historic Places
- U.S. National Historic Landmark
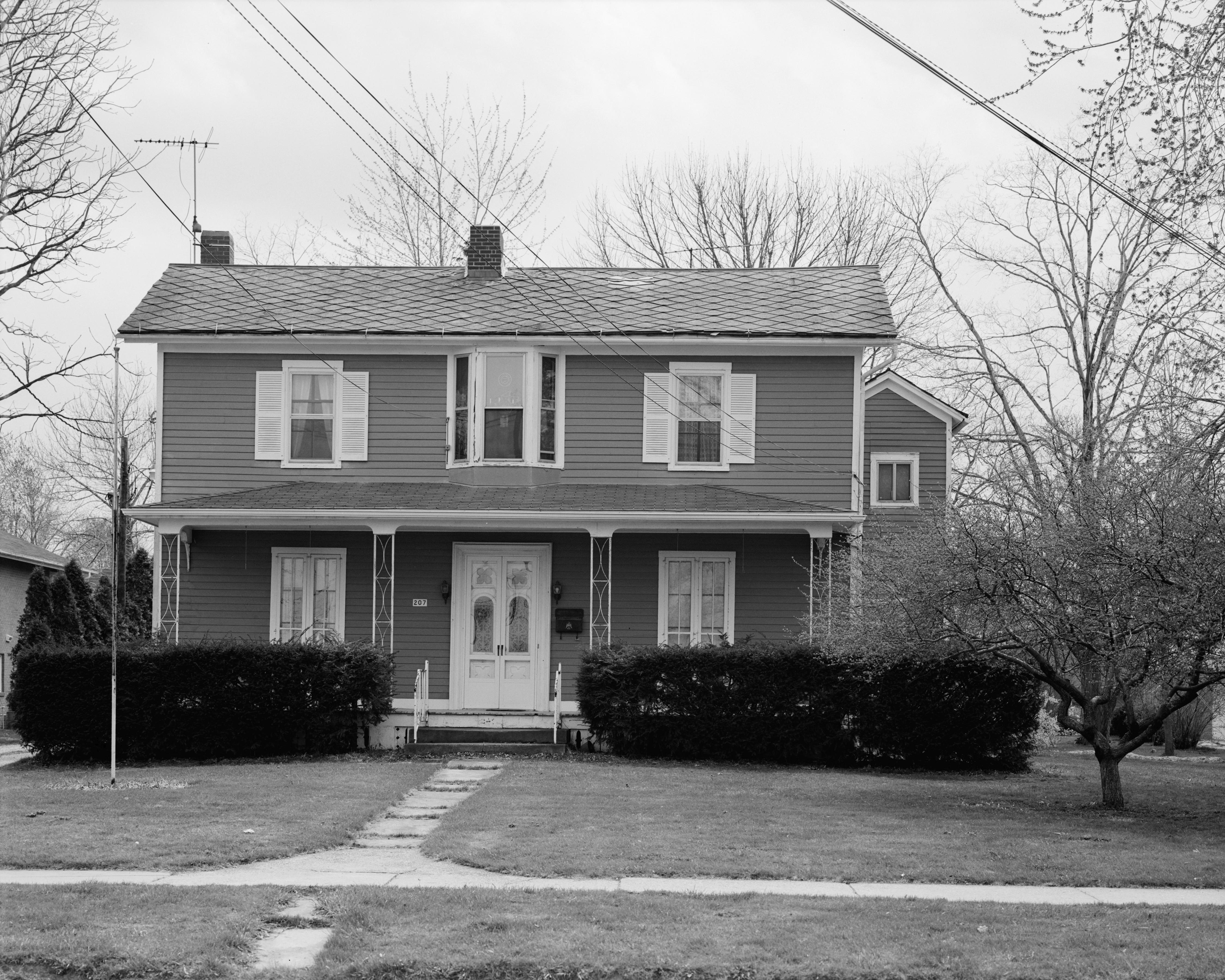
- Front of the Langston House, 1968 HABS photo

- Location within Ohio Location within the United States
- Location: 207 E. College St., Oberlin, Ohio
- Coordinates: 41°17′28″N 82°12′36″W
- Area: less than one acre
- Built: 1855
- Architectural style: Late Gothic Revival
- NRHP reference No.: 75001464

Significant dates
- Added to NRHP: May 15, 1975
- Designated NHL: May 15, 1975

The John Mercer Langston House is a historic house at 207 East College Street in Oberlin, Ohio. Built in 1855, it was home to John Mercer Langston (1829-1897), attorney, abolitionist, diplomat, US Congressman and college president, who was one of the first African Americans elected to public office in the United States. It was designated a National Historic Landmark in 1975.

== Description and history ==
The John Mercer Langston House is located on Oberlin's east side, on the south side of East College Avenue opposite the Eastwood School. It is a two-story frame structure, with a side gable roof and clapboarded exterior. The house is not particularly architecturally distinguished, although historic photos show it having a Gothic Revival porch, and its current entrance surround includes some Gothic elements. The current porch is a 20th-century alteration, with a hip roof and metalwork supports.

The house was built in 1855, and was from 1856 until 1867 the home of John Mercer Langston. The son of a slave woman and her white owner, Langston was raised in Ohio, attending Oberlin College and then reading law because no law school then accepted African Americans. In 1855, Langston won election to the position of town clerk in Brownhelm Township, the first known electoral victory of its kind by an African American in the United States. He later served as a recruiter of African Americans for military service in the American Civil War, and helped found the Howard University Law School, where he was its first dean.

== See also ==
- List of National Historic Landmarks in Ohio
- National Register of Historic Places listings in Lorain County, Ohio
