= United Church of Huntington =

Historic church in Ohio, United States

- U.S. National Register of Historic Places
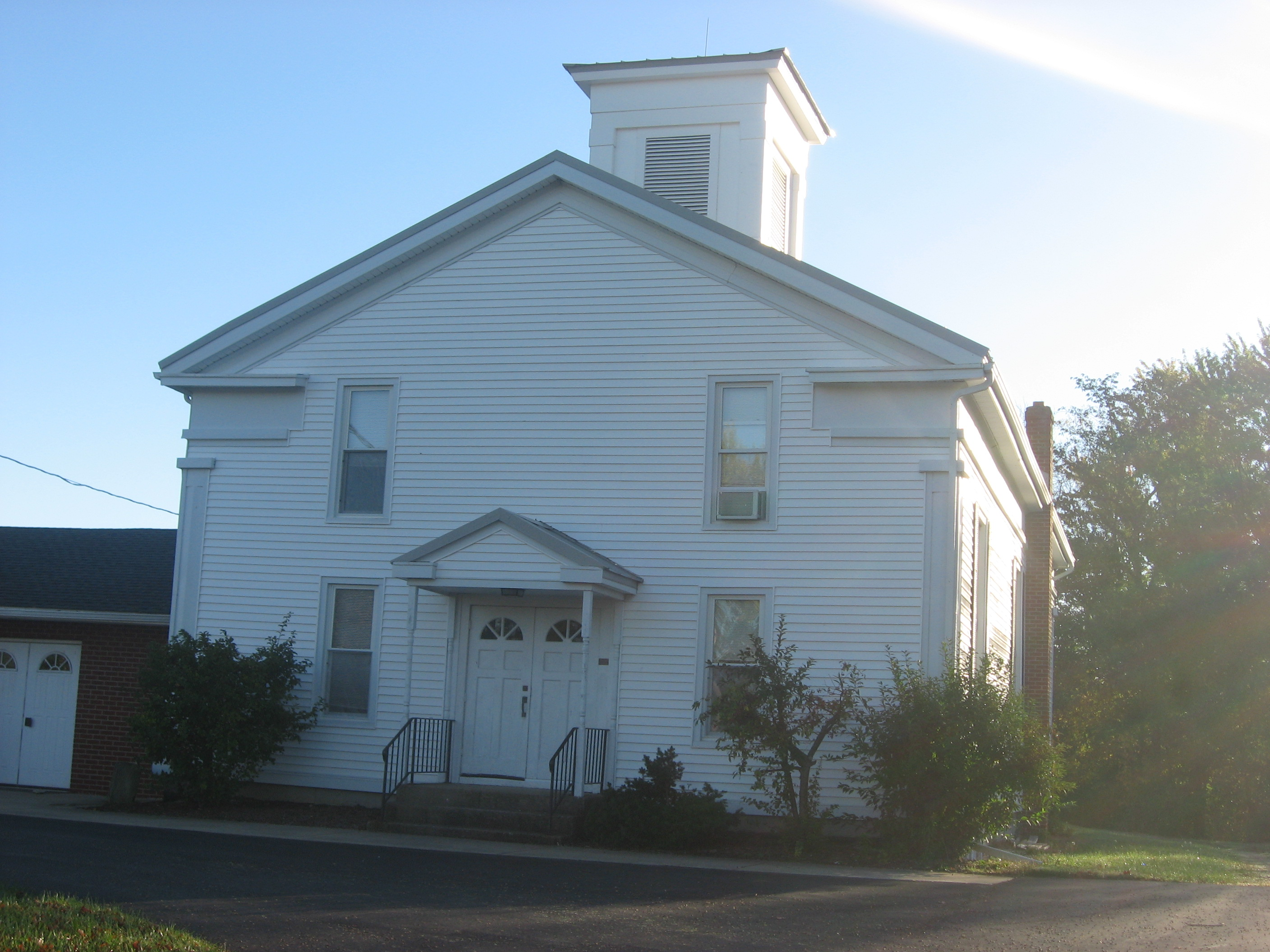
- Facade and south of church in 2013

- Location within Ohio Location within the United States
- Nearest city: Wellington, Ohio
- Coordinates: 41°6′19″N 82°13′11″W
- Area: 1.9 acres (0.77 ha)
- Built: 1847
- Architectural style: Greek Revival
- MPS: Wellington-Huntington Road MRA 64000656
- NRHP reference No.: 79003895
- Added to NRHP: 15 June 1979

United Church of Huntington is a historic church in Wellington, Ohio.

== Description and history ==
It was one of three churches in Huntington, Ohio at the time it was built in 1847. Originally a Methodist church it is now the United Church serving the reduced need for churches in the town. It is an example of Greek Revival architecture. It was added to the National Register of Historic Places on June 15, 1979, as a part of the Wellington–Huntington Road multiple resource area.

== See also ==
- Historic preservation
- National Register of Historic Places in Lorain County, Ohio
