= Mosher House =

House in Wellington, Ohio

- U.S. National Register of Historic Places
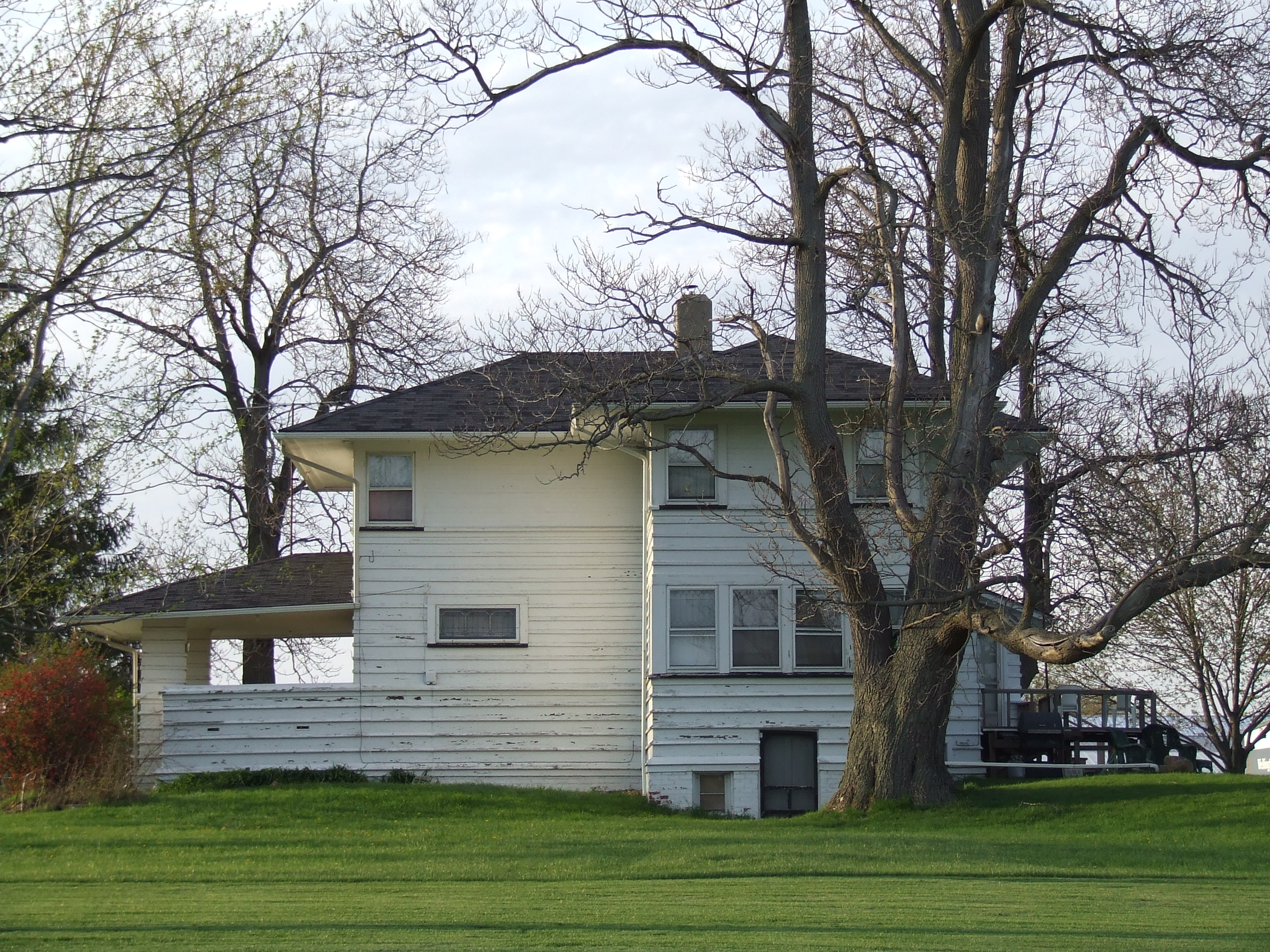
- The Mosher House in 2011

- Location within Ohio Location within the United States
- Nearest city: Wellington, Ohio
- Coordinates: 41°9′13″N 82°13′3″W
- Area: 1 acre (0.40 ha)
- Built: 1902
- Architect: Frank Lloyd Wright
- Architectural style: Prairie School
- MPS: Wellington-Huntington Road MRA 64000656
- NRHP reference No.: 79003887
- Added to NRHP: 15 June 1979

The Mosher House is a Prairie-style house constructed by John A. Mosher in Wellington, Ohio, in 1902. The two-story house has an asymmetrical cruciform plan with an open porch at the west side facing the street. The exterior has horizontal board and batten siding with stucco above the second floor window sill height. The hip roofs have broad overhangs on all sides.

The Mosher House is an anonymous design attributed by some to Frank Lloyd Wright. The attribution to Wright is not recognized by the Frank Lloyd Wright Foundation or most Wright scholars. William Allin Storrer, who had previously rejected the attribution, ultimately included it in the updated third edition of his catalog, The Architecture of Frank Lloyd Wright. The attribution to Wright is based mainly on superficial resemblance to an unbuilt Wright design for the same client, although there is no evidence connecting Wright to the design of the house that was eventually built.

The 1979 nomination to the National Register of Historic Places (NRHP) cites Wright as the architect but provides no evidence linking Wright to the design. Even so, the nomination notes that "It is doubtful that Wright supervised the work or even saw the house." In contrast, the 1979 NRHP nomination for the Wellington-Huntington Road Multiple Resource Area describes the Mosher House simply as "an interesting turn of the century house that shows the influence of the prairie style in its horizontal siding and broad overhanging eaves."

== See also ==
- List of Frank Lloyd Wright works
- National Register of Historic Places listings in Lorain County, Ohio
