= Beaver Creek settlement (Ohio) =

The Beaver Creek settlement (Lorain County, Ohio), or "Beaver Creek colony", was established in the year 1811, when a group of families from the area of Beaver Falls, Pennsylvania(USA), relocated to central northern Ohio (to an area which at that time was within "Huron County" Ohio, but which later became a part of Lorain County, Ohio). These families (perhaps organized and headed by Jacob Shupe) established a small community (or "settlement") in the northernmost vicinity of Beaver Creek where they also built a grist-mill and a saw-mill. A few decades later, many German immigrants arrived to the same area (mostly situated within the western portion of the present city-limits of Lorain, Ohio), and also built a German Church northerly of the mills During the 20th-century, this Beaver Creek Settlement area was entirely absorbed into the City of Lorain and also partly within the village of Amherst, Ohio.
