= Amherst Town Hall =

- U.S. National Register of Historic Places
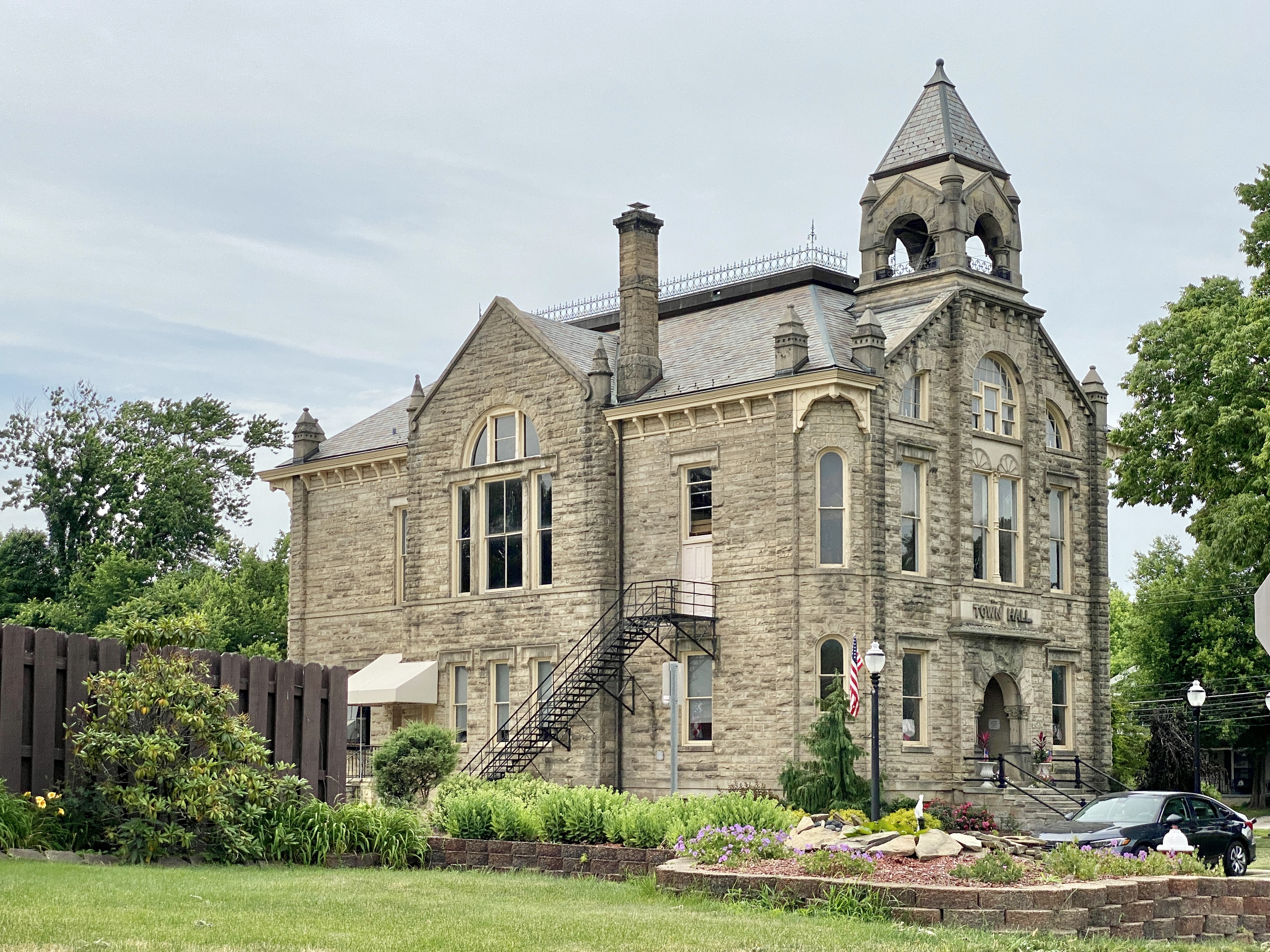
- Front and side of building in 2022

- Location within Ohio Location within the United States
- Location: 206 S. Main St., Amherst, Ohio
- Coordinates: 41°23′53.83″N 82°13′36.62″W
- NRHP reference No.: 75001459
- Added to NRHP: May 29, 1975

Amherst Town Hall is a historic building in Amherst, Ohio. It was listed in the National Register of Historic Places on May 29, 1975.

== See also ==
- Historic preservation
- National Register of Historic Places listings in Lorain County, Ohio
- Town hall
