= Elyria station (New York Central Railroad) =

Elyria
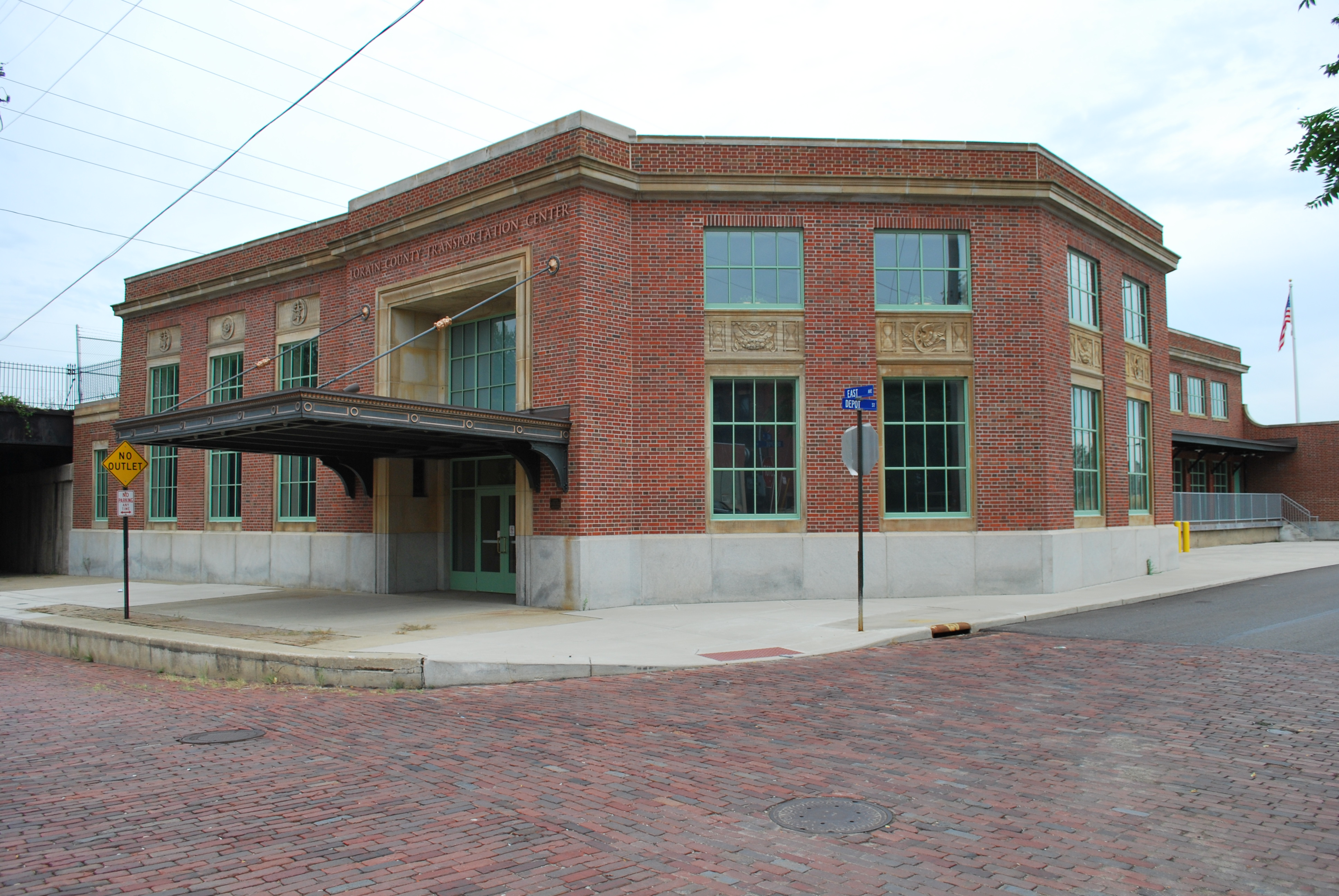
- Elyria station in 2012

General information
- Other names: Lorain County Transportation and Community Center
- Location: 40 East Avenue; Elyria, Ohio; United States
- Coordinates: 41°22′06″N 82°06′13″W
- Owner: Lorain County
- Line: Chicago Line (Norfolk Southern)
- Tracks: 2
- Bus operators: GoBus: Gray Line; Greyhound Lines; LCT: 51

Construction
- Architect: Alfred T. Fellheimer
- Architectural style: Neoclassical

History
- Opened: April 6, 1925
- Closed: July 30, 1958
- Original company: New York Central Railroad

Former services
Preceding station	New York Central Railroad	Following station
Amherst toward Chicago	Main Line	Shawville toward New York
Oberlin toward Millbury Junction	Norwalk Branch	Terminus

U.S. National Register of Historic Places
- Official name: Old Railroad Station
- Designated: August 13, 1979
- Part of: Elyria MRA
- Reference no.: 79002714
Location

Elyria station is a former train station in the city of Elyria in Lorain County, Ohio. The station was completed in 1925 for the New York Central Railroad. It was listed on the National Register of Historic Places in 1979. The station building was purchased by Lorain County in 2009 for transit bus service and was reopened as the Lorain County Transportation and Community Center. It is currently served by GoBus and Greyhound Lines on intercity bus routes, and Lorain County Transit on local routes.

== History ==
The new Elyria station was opened by the New York Central on April 6, 1925.

In February 1958, the Elyria station building was sold to a local lumber and coal company for use as its corporate headquarters as the New York Central sought ways to cut costs. Passenger service from the Elyria station ended on July 30, 1958; service was transferred to the nearby New York Central freight depot off of Buckeye Street. The building was remodeled to act as a showroom for lumber and wood paneling, as well as to contain the back offices for the company, that was opened to the public in April 1959.

Possession of the building was transferred in July 1968 to the owner of a cosmetology school after the bankruptcy of the lumber company and the building was foreclosed. The station building was listed on the National Register of Historic Places on August 13, 1979. The cosmetology school was closed on February 8, 1992, with the owners citing changes in education and career trends contributing to the decline in enrollment, leaving the station building vacant.

=== Lorain County ===
On July 6, 2000, the Lorain County commissioners voted to purchase the station building for use as an intermodal transit center from the owner of the defunct cosmetology school for $225,000.

=== Amtrak ===
In May 2024, Amtrak announced plans to return passenger service to the 1925 station from its current station. Amtrak committed $5 million of funding for the relocation in 2026 with the remainder expected from the Lorain County and the federal government. The station would be reopened by early-2028.

== See also ==
- National Register of Historic Places listings in Lorain County, Ohio
