= Avon Isle =

Historic house in Ohio, United States

- U.S. National Register of Historic Places
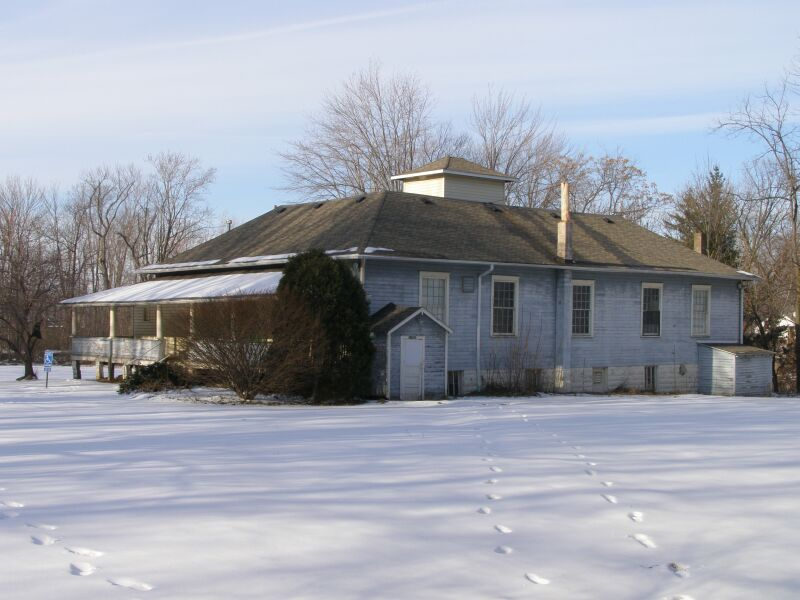

- Location within Ohio Location within the United States
- Location: 37080 Detroit Road, Avon, Ohio
- Coordinates: 41°27′0″N 82°1′58″W
- Area: 5 acres (2.0 ha)
- Built: ca 1920
- Architectural style: Neoclassical and Italian Revival
- NRHP reference No.: 10000456
- Added to NRHP: July 8, 2010

Avon Isle Park Pavilion is a 50 feet (15 m) by 70 feet (21 m) sandstone dance pavilion located on Detroit Road, Avon, Ohio. The dance pavilion is housed in a building featuring several French Colonial revival architecture pieces, including a low hip roof and columned porches. Overall, the building is 48 feet (15 m) by 68 feet (21 m) and features a stage and kitchenette. From the 1920s until the 1970s, the venue hosted a variety of civic and social events. It was also available for private events. During the early years, the larger cities nearby; Lorain and Elyria prohibited dancing on Sunday. This allowed Avon Isle to host big-name entertainers like Guy Lombardo. Currently, the building has been renovated and is available for rent by businesses as well as individuals who wish to use the building as a venue for their events at a fee for Avon residents of $150 for the first two hours and an additional $35 for each additional hour and a fee of $200 with a fee of $50 for each additional hour for non-Avon residents.

Avon Isle was listed on the National Register of Historic Places in 2010.
