= Old St. John's Church (Elyria, Ohio) =

- Formerly listed on the U.S. National Register of Historic Places
- Location within Ohio Location within the United States
- Location: 600 W. Broad St., Elyria, Ohio
- Coordinates: 41°22′3″N 82°6′38″W
- Area: less than one acre
- Built: 1889
- Architectural style: Gothic
- MPS: Elyria MRA
- NRHP reference No.: 79002721

Significant dates
- Added to NRHP: August 13, 1979
- Removed from NRHP: May 12, 2016

Old St. John's Church was a historic church at 600 W. Broad Street in Elyria, Ohio.

It was built in 1889 and added to the National Register of Historic Places in 1979. It was delisted in 2016.
