= Lorain Fire Station No. 1 =

- U.S. National Register of Historic Places
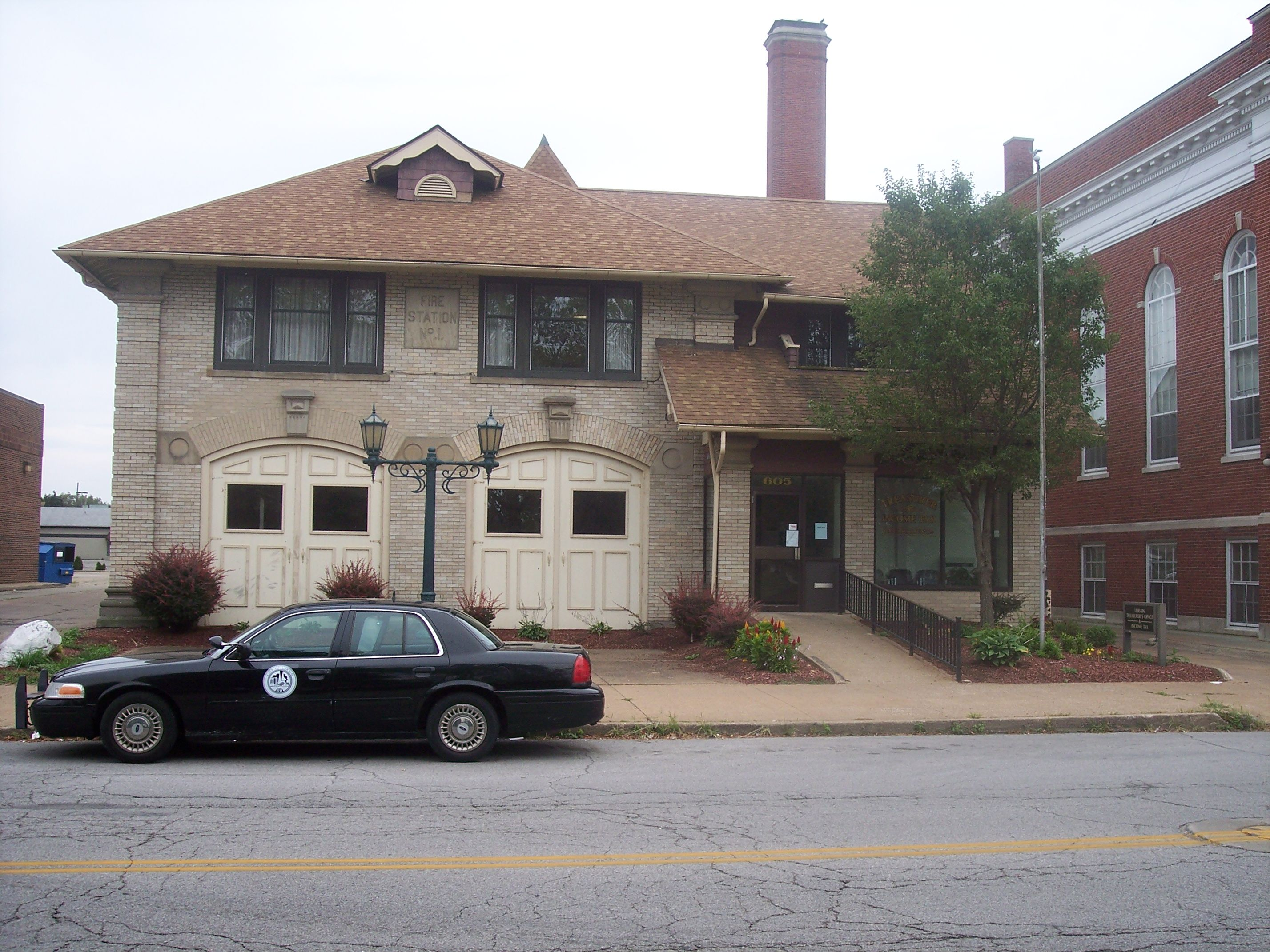

- Location within Ohio
- Location: 605 W. Fourth St., Lorain, Ohio
- Coordinates: 41°28′00″N 82°10′47″W
- Area: less than one acre
- Built: 1912
- Architect: Hamilton E. Ford
- Architectural style: Colonial Revival
- NRHP reference No.: 87001374
- Added to NRHP: August 20, 1987

The Lorain Fire Station No. 1, at 605 W. Fourth St. in Lorain, Ohio. It served Lorain as a fire station for over 60 years. It was built after a fire killed four persons, including a woman and two children., It was built in 1912 in the Colonial Revival style so as to blend into the primarily residential neighborhood. The building was heavily damaged but survived the 1924 Lorain tornado.

It was listed on the National Register of Historic Places in 1987. Today the building serves as the City of Lorain's Treasurer's Office.
