= Mike Finley =

American writer (1950–2020)

- Born: July 4, 1950
- Died: August 10, 2020 (aged 70); Saint Paul, Minnesota, U.S.
- Occupations: Writer; poet; videographer
- Writing career
- Notable awards: Pushcart Prize
- Website: mikefinleywriter.com

Mike Finley (July 4, 1950 – August 10, 2020) was an American writer, poet, and videographer from Youngstown, Ohio.

== Publications ==
Why Teams Don't Work, Robbins and Finley's first collaboration, was named "Best Management Book, The Americas, 1995" by the Booz Allen Hamilton/Financial Times Global Business Book Awards. It was published in a second edition, titled The New Why Teams Don't Work, by Berrett-Koehler Publishers, 2000.

In addition, Finley is author of a business/technology book of his own, Techno-Crazed (Peterson's, 1996).

Finley is a Pushcart Prize-winning author, with work appearing in the 1985 Pushcart Prize Anthology.

He has authored over 160 books, including 100 books of poetry, stories and creative nonfiction, mostly from Kraken Press. Titles include:

- Instructions for Falling, Selected Works, 2018
- Yukon Gold: Poemes de Terre, Selected Works, 1970-2010
- Don’t Be Like The Moon, 2014
- Looking for China, Selected Works, 1967-1987
- Seventy Years Before the Plough, 2002

Finley was co-editor with Danny Klecko of LIEF Magazine, an online journal of arts running from 2010 to 2015 and dedicated to bright messages. Finley has collaborated on three print volumes with Klecko: Out for a Lark (2013), The Bluebeard of Happiness (2013) and A Pox on Your Blessings (2013).

== Prizes ==
- Winner, the KPV Kerouac Award, 2011
- Finley's journalism, criticism, and other work appeared in Rolling Stone, St. Paul Pioneer Press, Minnesota Monthly, Paris Review, Success Magazine and Guideposts.
- He was awarded a Wisconsin State Arts Fellowship for fiction in 1985.
- In 2010 he published Zombie Girl, a novella about the death of his daughter Daniele Finley.

Finley managed Robots & Pirates, a small foundation providing services to young people in trouble in Minneapolis/St. Paul.

Finley lived in Saint Paul, Minnesota. In 2017, he was diagnosed with metastatic prostate cancer. He died at his home on August 10, 2020.
