= Huntington Grange =

- U.S. National Register of Historic Places
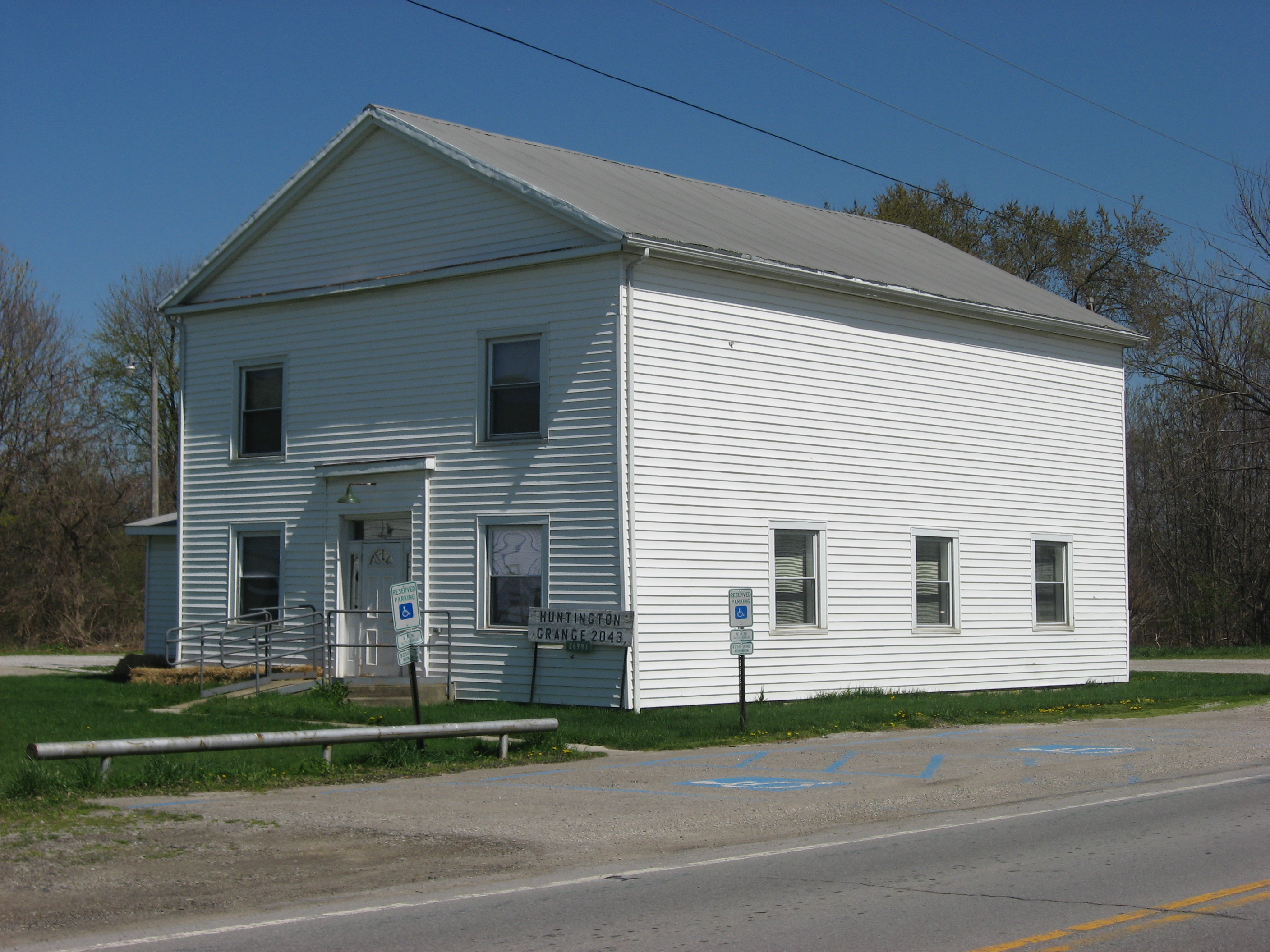
- Front and side of the grange

- Location within Ohio Location within the United States
- Nearest city: Wellington, Ohio
- Coordinates: 41°6′3″N 82°13′11″W
- Area: 4.9 acres (2.0 ha)
- Built: 1842-46
- Architectural style: Greek Revival
- MPS: Wellington-Huntington Road MRA
- NRHP reference No.: 79003884
- Added to NRHP: June 15, 1979

The Huntington Grange, also known as Old Baptist Church, in Wellington, Ohio, is a Greek Revival building built during 1842-46 as a Baptist church. It is of wood-frame construction on a sandstone base.

It was listed on the National Register of Historic Places in 1979.
