= Avery House (Fort Collins, Colorado) =

- U.S. National Register of Historic Places
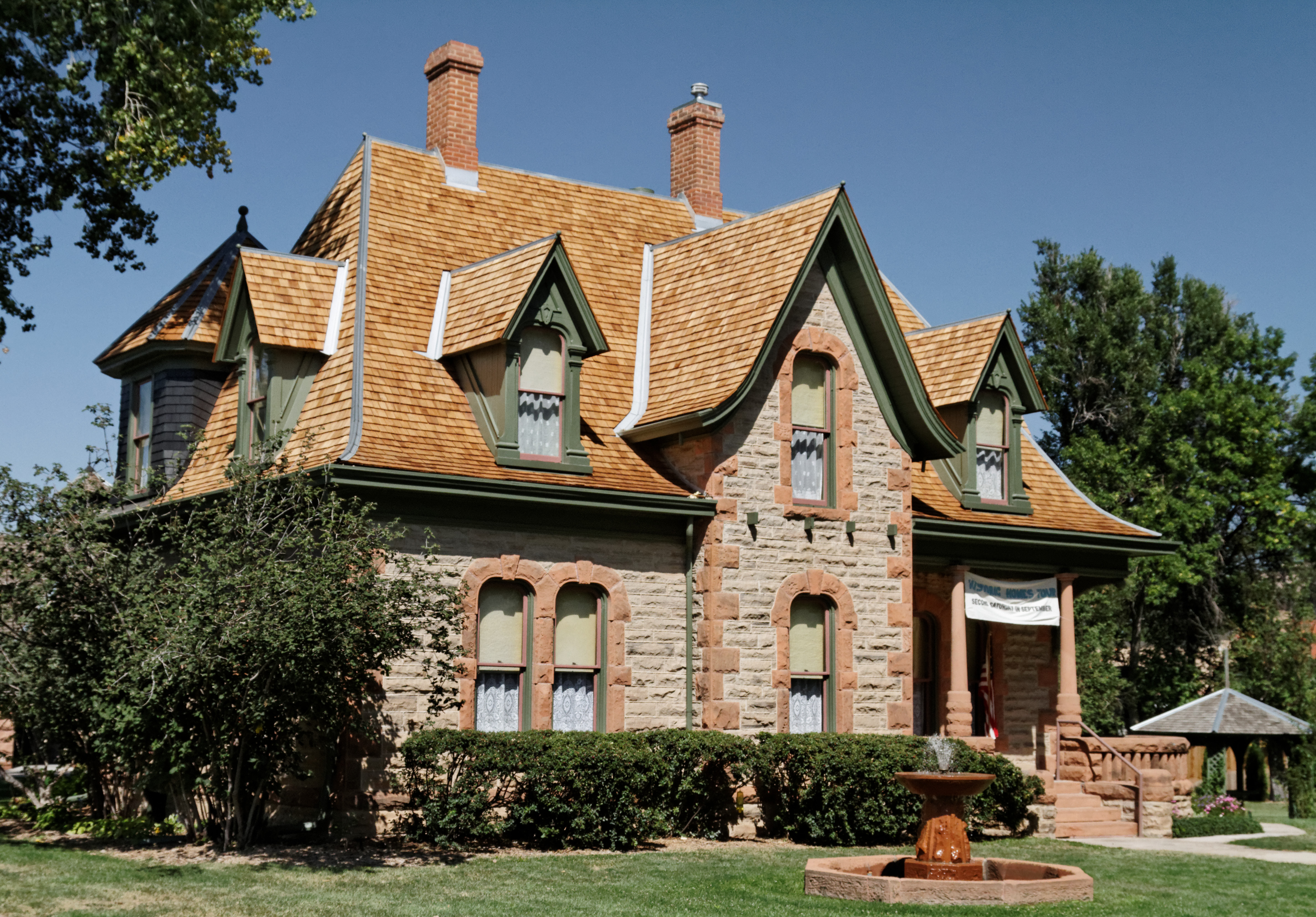
- House in 2012

- Location within Colorado
- Location: 328 W. Mountain Ave., Fort Collins, Colorado
- Coordinates: 40°35′14″N 105°04′53″W
- Area: less than one acre
- Built: 1879
- Architectural style: Gothic
- NRHP reference No.: 72000274
- Added to NRHP: June 24, 1972

The Avery House, at 328 W. Mountain Ave. in Fort Collins, Colorado, United States, was built in 1879. It was listed on the National Register of Historic Places in 1972.

The house and its stable house are two contributing buildings on the property. The two-story house is asserted by the Fort Collins Landmark Commission to be "one of the city's best remaining examples of the colorful construction done during its early days and of High Victorian Gothic architecture."

It was hoped that National Register listing would improve likelihood the house would be preserved, in face of high real estate prices and development pressure in Fort Collins.

In 1974, the Poudre Landmarks Foundation bought the house for $79,000. It is open for public tours on weekends year round. The home is available for wedding and private event rentals.
