= New Russia Township, Lorain County, Ohio =

Township in Ohio, US

- Township
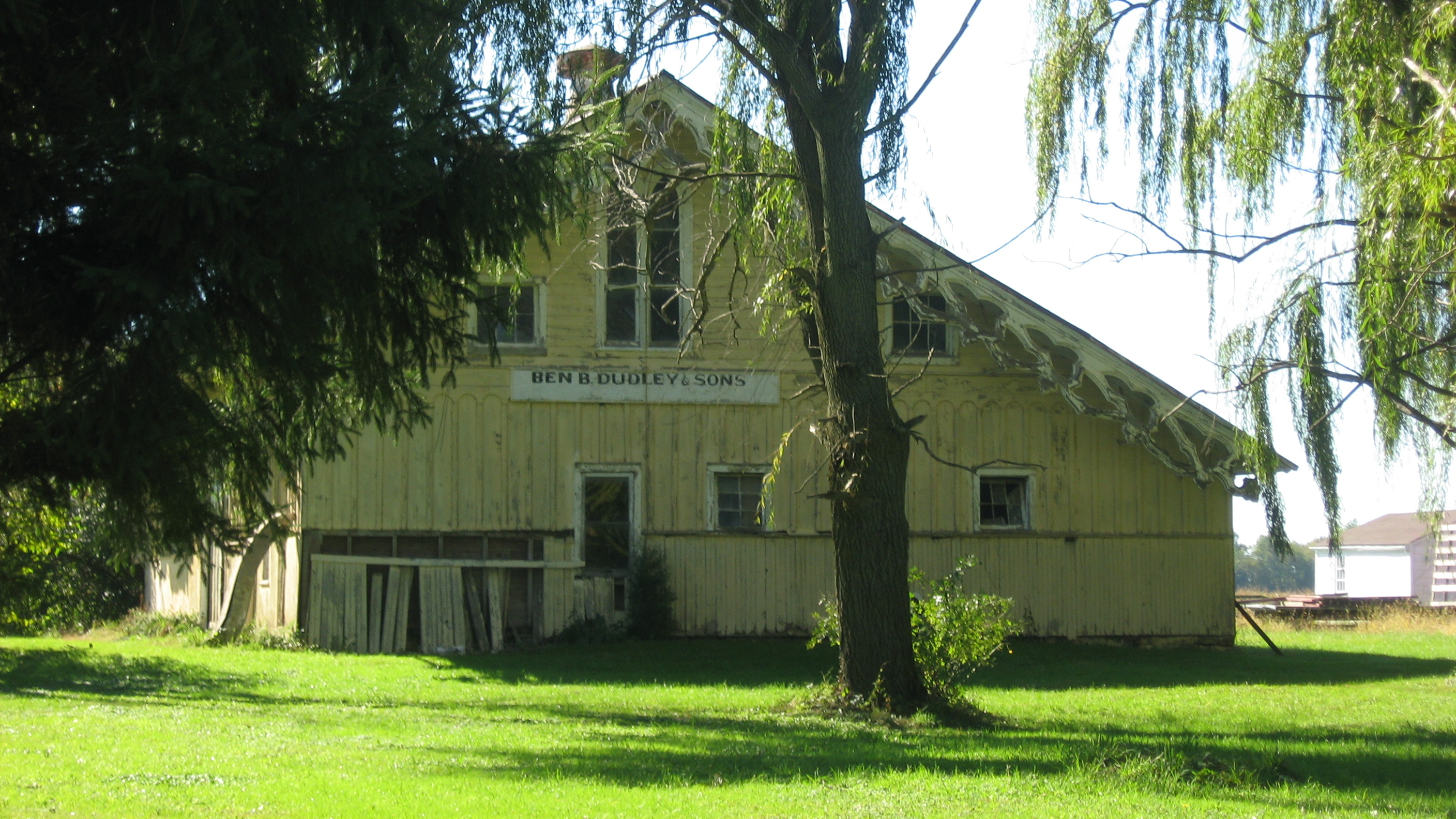
- The Reamer Barn west of Oberlin

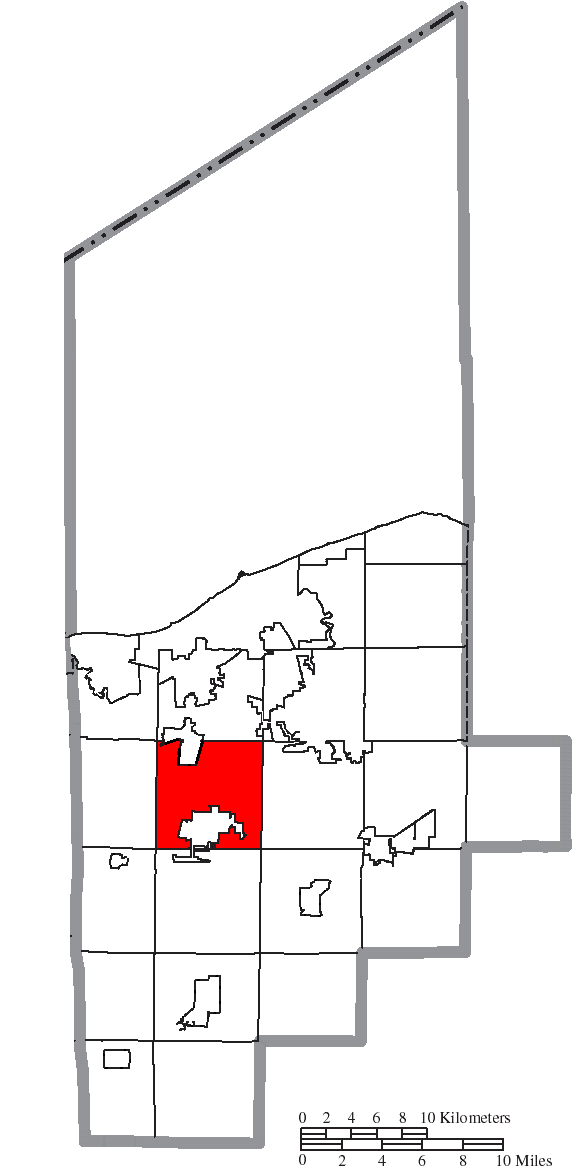
- Location of New Russia Township in Lorain County
- Coordinates: 41°18′20″N 82°13′7″W
- Country: United States
- State: Ohio
- County: Lorain

Area
  - Total: 24.24 sq mi (62.78 km^{2})
  - Land: 24.12 sq mi (62.46 km^{2})
  - Water: 0.12 sq mi (0.32 km^{2})
- Elevation: 804 ft (245 m)

Population (2020)
  - Total: 2,404
  - Density: 99.69/sq mi (38.49/km^{2})
- Time zone: UTC-5 (Eastern (EST))
  - Summer (DST): UTC-4 (EDT)
- FIPS code: 39-55446
- GNIS feature ID: 1729754
- Website: www.newrussiatownship-oh.gov

New Russia Township is one of the eighteen townships of Lorain County, Ohio, United States. As of the 2020 census the population was 2,404.

== Geography ==
Located in central Lorain County, it borders the following townships and city:

- Amherst Township - north
- Elyria Township - northeast corner
- Carlisle Township - east
- LaGrange Township - southeast corner
- Oberlin - south
- Pittsfield Township - south
- Camden Township - southwest corner
- Henrietta Township - west
- Brownhelm Township - northwest corner

Part of the village of South Amherst is located in the township's northwest.

== Name and history ==
It is the only New Russia Township statewide. Previously known as "Russia Township", the name "New Russia" became effective on January 1, 1992 after the residents of the township wanted to separate from the City of Oberlin over concerns due to the municipality's growth.

== Government ==
The township is governed by a three-member board of trustees, who are elected in November of odd-numbered years to a four-year term beginning on the following January 1. Two are elected in the year after the presidential election and one is elected in the year before it. There is also an elected township fiscal officer, who serves a four-year term beginning on April 1 of the year after the election, which is held in November of the year before the presidential election. Vacancies in the fiscal officership or on the board of trustees are filled by the remaining trustees.
