= Carlos Avery House =

Historic house in Ohio, United States

- U.S. National Register of Historic Places
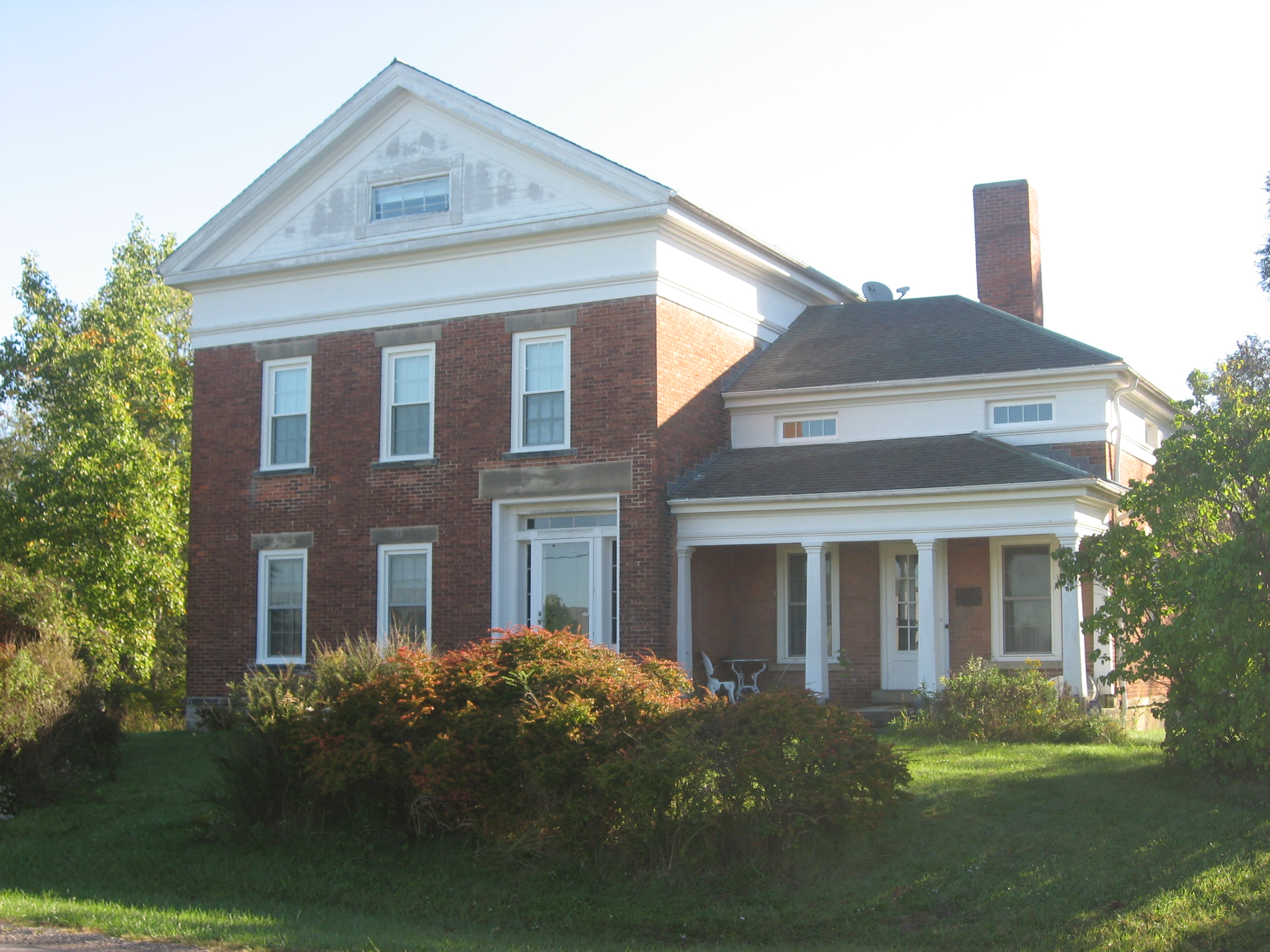
- Front and southern side in 2013

- Location within Ohio Location within the United States
- Location: 18797 OH 59 in Pittsfield Township, Ohio
- Coordinates: 41°12′32″N 82°13′11″W
- Built: 1855
- Architectural style: Greek Revival
- NRHP reference No.: 84003762
- Added to NRHP: 31 May 1984

Carlos Avery House is a historic house in the Pittsfield Township, Ohio.

== Description and history ==
The house was built in 1855 and reflects the Greek Revival architectural style. The large two-story brick house sits on a spacious lot slightly elevated from street level. The isolated site has few structures nearby. The first home of Carlos Avery is 300 feet (91 m) to the north and the remnants of a bridge that spanned the Black River. Sitting above the roadway at a curve the house is a prominent feature in the area. The wooded banks of the river behind the house create a picturesque scene.

The foundation is cut sandstone with the top course projecting to form a water table. The walls of locally made brick are not laid in discernable bond pattern. The main mass is rectangular with a gable end facade, a smaller longer wing is attached on the south side has a porch on the west (front). The entry is set to the south of the facade of the main section. The door is flanked by sidelights and has a transom. Simple stone lintels and sills surround the door and six-over-six double-hung sashes of the facade of this section. Two windows are beside the door to the north and above are three symmetrically arranged over the first floor fenestration.

An unusual feature of this section is a broad entablature that projects from the plane of the wall and is painted white. The gable ends have full triangular pediments and broad rectangular attic windows. The smaller wing recalls this with a white frieze featuring long rectangular fenestration. An additional wing apparently built at the same time as the house extends into the space between the two main sections in the rear.

The door opens into a large central hallway on the south of the main section with an open stairway leading to a similar hallway on the second floor. To the right of the stairs is a large open parlor with massive Greek Revival woodwork including triangular pediments above the doors and windows. The south section contains a dining room with fireplace and a kitchen with large fireplace. An unusual curved wall creates a pantry at the rear of this space. This section includes a number of small purposed rooms including an area for spinning flax.

The second floor of the main section has three large bedrooms with woodwork like that below except that it is raked along the sides. A basement with a summer kitchen a fireplace for cooking.

The Carlos Avery House is historically significant as a fine example of domestic rural Greek Revival architecture distinguished by its size and details. The largest extant building from before the Civil War, the property was listed in the National Register of Historic Places on May 31, 1984.

== See also ==
- National Register of Historic Places architectural style categories
- National Register of Historic Places listings in Lorain County, Ohio
