= Reamer Barn =

- U.S. National Register of Historic Places
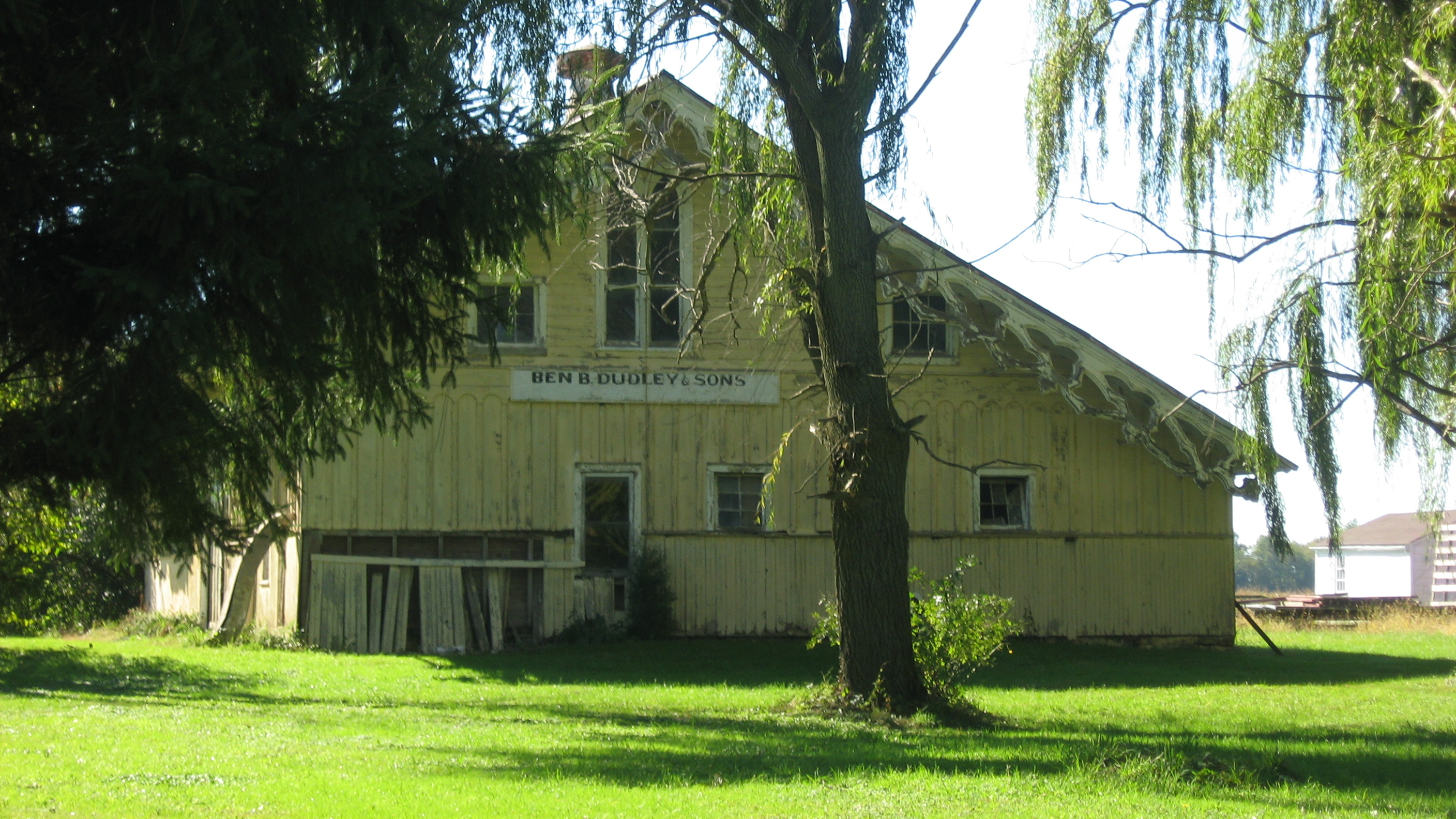
- Front of the barn

- Location within Ohio Location within the United States
- Location: Southern side of State Route 511, east of Quarry Rd. and west of Oberlin, Ohio
- Coordinates: 41°17′38″N 82°14′42″W
- Area: 1 acre (0.40 ha)
- Built: 1897
- Architect: Charlie Glen; Fred Copland
- Architectural style: Art Nouveau
- NRHP reference No.: 79001889
- Added to NRHP: March 21, 1979

The Reamer Barn is a historic barn near the village of Oberlin in the northeastern part of the U.S. state of Ohio. Constructed at the end of the nineteenth century, it was built to house a gentleman farmer's cattle herd, and it has been named a historic site because of its distinctive architecture.

== Property history ==
Born in nineteenth-century Pennsylvania, Daniel P. Reamer moved to northeastern Ohio and established general stores in Oberlin and the nearby village of Wellington. He left the region in 1872 and settled in Leavenworth, Kansas, where he became a successful door-to-door seller of furniture to businesses and government offices, working for the A.H. Andrews Furniture Company. His standing within the company was high enough that he was seemingly able to get his nephew Robert a job with the firm, but within a few years he decided to return to Ohio. He accomplished this goal in the late 1870s, and twenty years after settling back into Oberlin, he chose to purchase a small herd of Jersey cattle and arranged for the construction of a new barn to house them. Rather than building a simple vernacular structure for his cattle, he obtained the services of an architect: his nephew Daniel A. Reamer, who produced a Swiss-influenced Gothic Revival design. Constructed on the foundation of an earlier structure completed in 1837, the new barn served Reamer for three years until his 1900 death. Reamer's former neighbors across the road, the Dudley family, purchased his property in 1907, which they proceeded to operate as a dairy farm into the 1950s. Later owners have not continued the barn's original use; by the 1970s, it was used only for storage.

== Architecture ==
An Art Nouveau structure built with weatherboarded walls, the Reamer Barn is topped with three distinctive ventilators on the gabled roofline. Other significant elements of the design include the rounded panels partway up the sides, and an ornamental bargeboard that extends 3 feet (0.91 m) out from the northern end of the building. These elements won the barn attention soon after its construction, both because of their practical benefits and because of their rarity as architectural styling on a farm building.

== Preservation ==
Although it had been converted into storage, a historic preservation survey of New Russia Township conducted in the late 20th century deemed the Reamer Barn one of the township's most significant buildings. As such, it was listed on the National Register of Historic Places in early 1979 because of its architecture. It is one of twelve National Register-listed locations in and around Oberlin.
