= St. Andrew's Episcopal Church (Elyria, Ohio) =

Historic church in Ohio, United States

- U.S. National Register of Historic Places
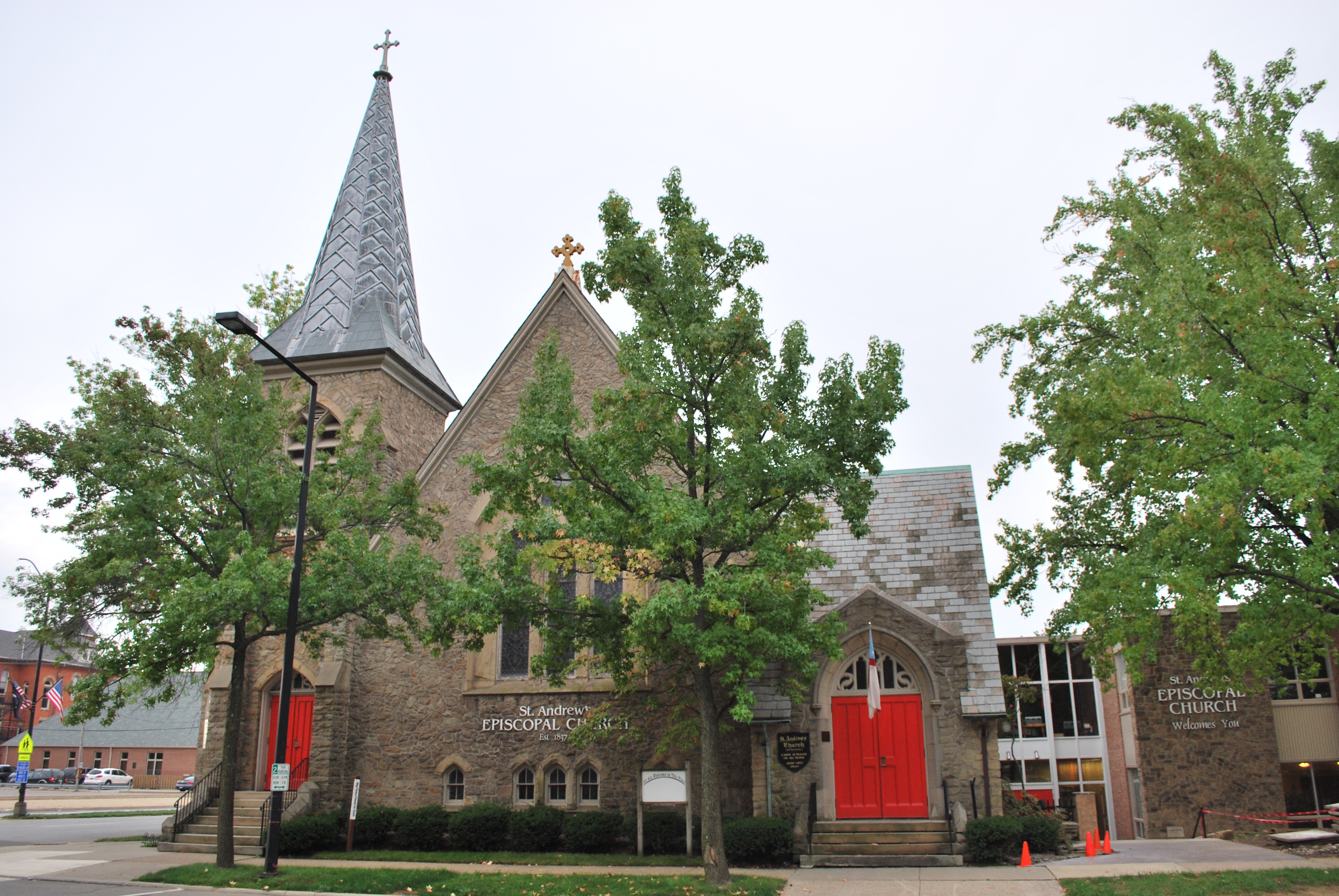

- Location within Ohio Location within the United States
- Location: 300 3rd St., Elyria, Ohio
- Coordinates: 41°21′54″N 82°6′26″W
- Area: less than one acre
- Built: 1872
- Architectural style: Gothic Revival
- MPS: Elyria MRA
- NRHP reference No.: 79002731
- Added to NRHP: August 13, 1979

St. Andrew's Episcopal Church is a historic church at 300 3rd Street in Elyria, Ohio. It was built in 1872 and added to the National Register of Historic Places in 1979. It is a parish of the Episcopal Diocese of Ohio.

In 2018, the church reported 321 members; in 2023, it reported 226 members. No membership statistics were reported in 2024 national parochial reports. Plate and pledge financial support reported by the church in 2024 was $267,523. Average Sunday Attendance (ASA) reported in 2024 was 52 persons. This was a relative decrease on ASA of 581 in 2017.
