= Columbia Baptist Church =

Historic church in Ohio, United States

- U.S. National Register of Historic Places
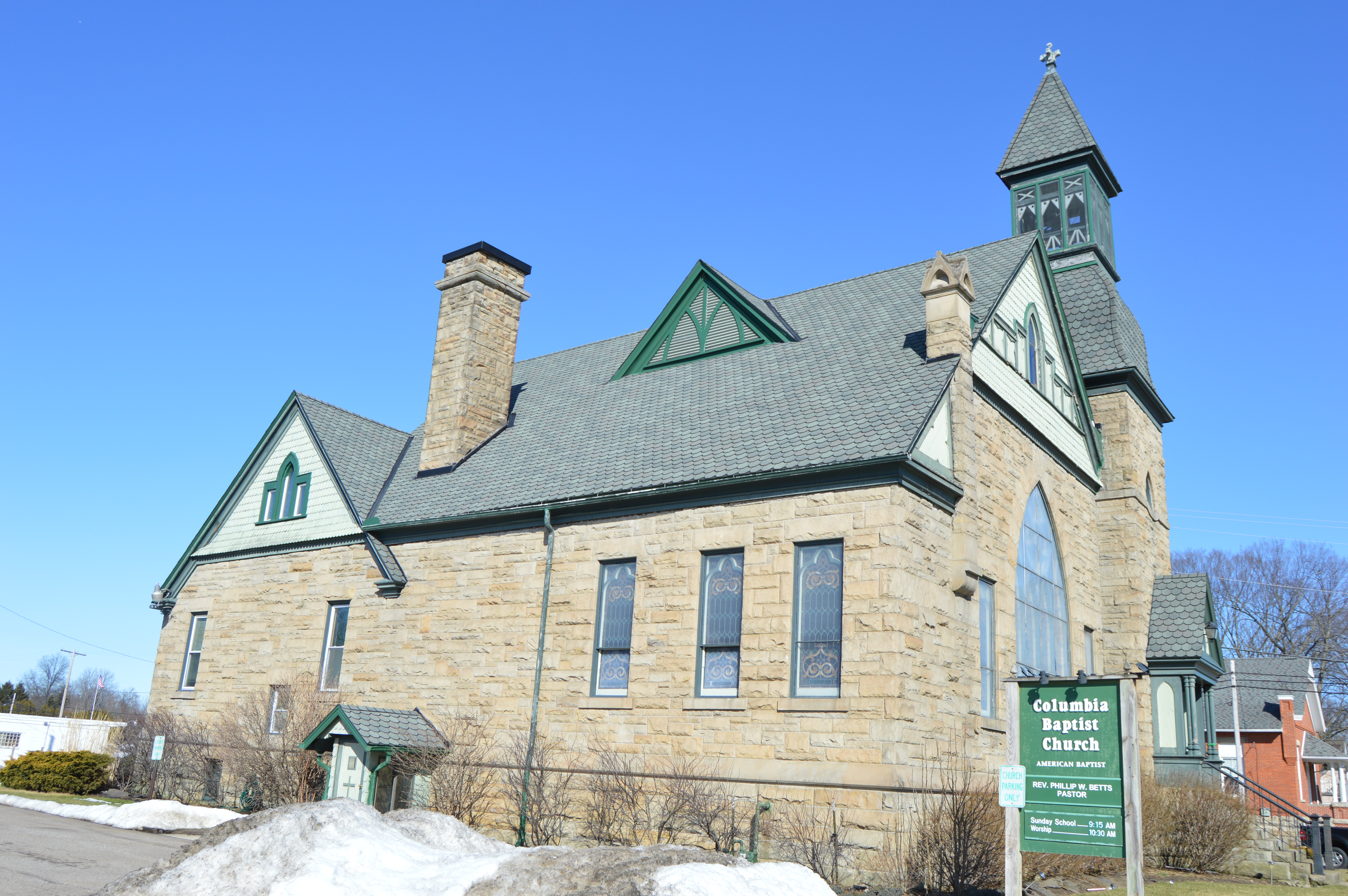
- Western side and front

- Location within Ohio Location within the United States
- Location: 25514 Royalton Rd., Columbia Station, Ohio
- Coordinates: 41°18′47″N 81°55′32″W
- Area: less than one acre
- Built: 1900
- NRHP reference No.: 76001466
- Added to NRHP: July 12, 1976

Columbia Baptist Church is a historic church at 25514 Royalton Road in Columbia Station, Ohio. The church was built in 1900 for the local Baptist congregation, which formed in 1832 and had previously used a wood-frame building for its church. The congregation built their church from locally quarried sandstone and gave it a design which combined the Stick Style and Queen Anne style. The church features an intersecting gable roof, a gothic arched stained glass window next to the main entrance, and several smaller stained glass windows illustrating Bible scenes. Its 77 feet (23 m) bell tower has a bell-shaped roof and is the tallest structure in Columbia Center.

The church was added to the National Register on July 12, 1976.
