= Amherst, Ohio =

- City
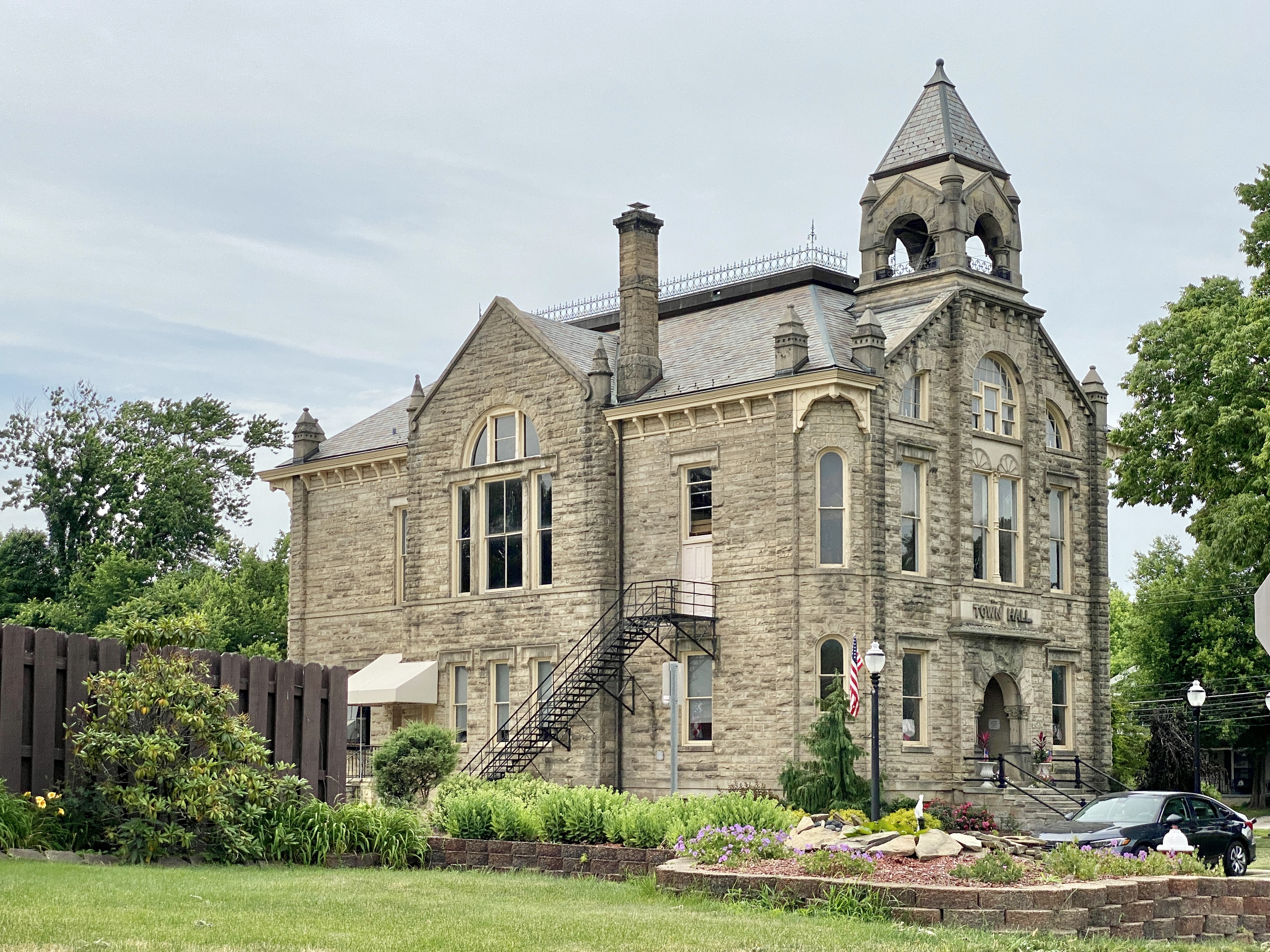
- Amherst Town Hall
- Motto: "Sandstone Center of the World"
- Location in Greater Cleveland

- Location within Ohio Location within the United States
- Coordinates: 41°24′15″N 82°14′38″W
- Country: United States
- State: Ohio
- County: Lorain

Area
  - Total: 7.14 sq mi (18.50 km^{2})
  - Land: 7.08 sq mi (18.35 km^{2})
  - Water: 0.062 sq mi (0.16 km^{2})
- Elevation: 646 ft (197 m)

Population (2020)
  - Total: 12,681
  - Estimate (2023): 12,928
  - Density: 1,790.1/sq mi (691.15/km^{2})
- Time zone: UTC-5 (Eastern (EST))
  - Summer (DST): UTC-4 (EDT)
- ZIP code: 44001
- Area code: 440
- FIPS code: 39-01798
- GNIS feature ID: 1086498
- Website: www.amherstohio.org

Amherst (/ˈæmhərst/ AM-hərst) is a city in Lorain County, Ohio, United States. It is located 28 miles (45 km) west of Cleveland within the Cleveland metropolitan area. The population was 12,681 at the 2020 census.

== History ==
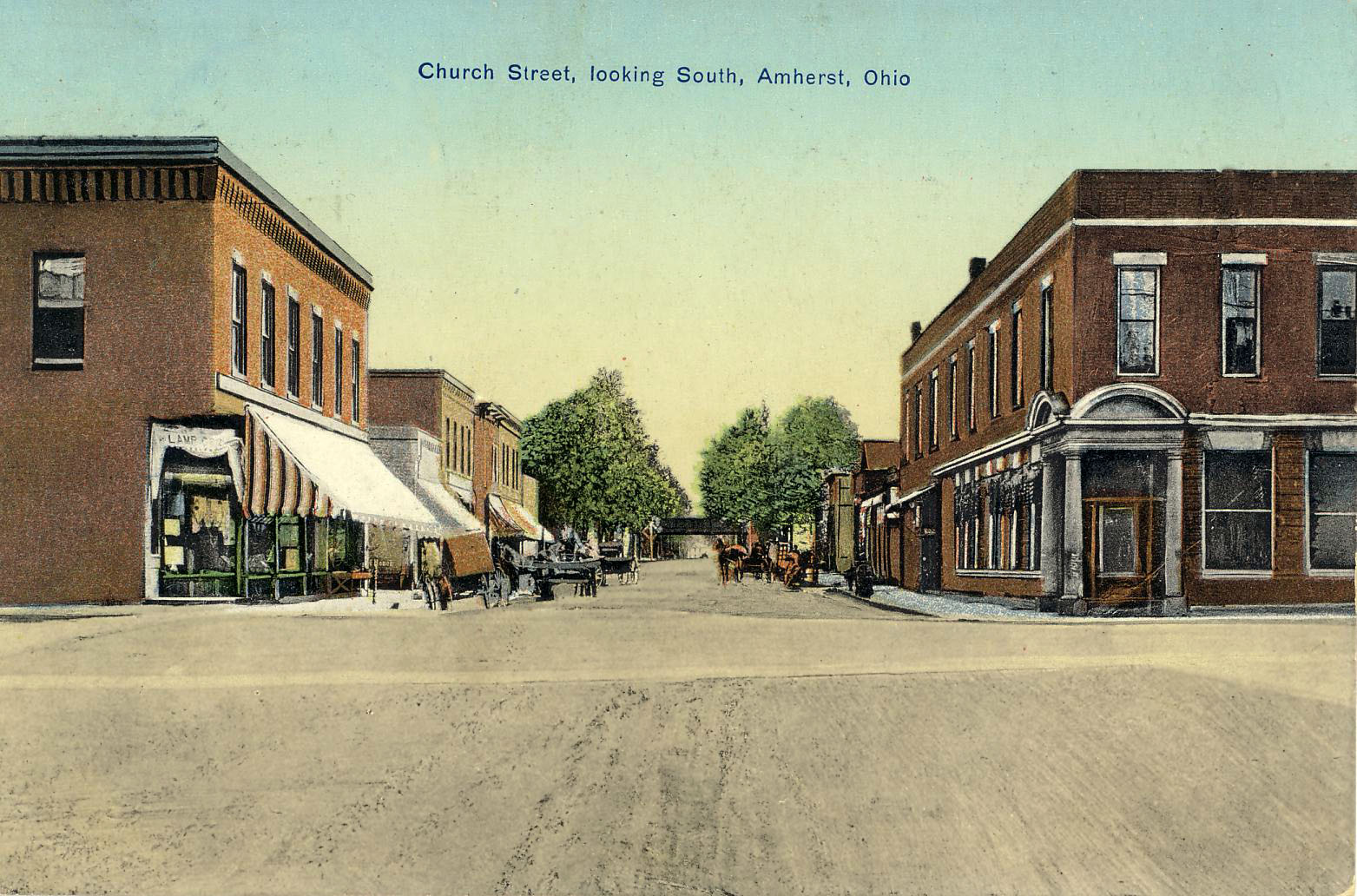
Church Street, looking South in Amherst, Ohio, circa 1910

The original village, which eventually became known as Amherst, was established/founded by pioneer settler Jacob Shupe (who came to this area in 1811; however, what would become the specific “downtown” area was settled by Josiah Harris in 1818), although the original tiny village was first known only as "Amherst Corners" in the early-1830s. When the village-plat was officially recorded in 1836, it was simply named the "town plat of Amherst", but became "Amherstville" circa-1839, and was later changed to "North Amherst", until finally again simply 'Amherst' in 1909. (The original 1820s postal-name of the village's first post-office was "Plato"; and the village's post-office retained that postal-name into the 1840s, even after the local-government name of the village officially became 'Amherstville' by 1840.)

Land which was settled in 1811 by Jacob Shupe, in the "Beaver Creek Settlement" (about a mile north of the later village site), was eventually included into the Amherst city-limits. Shupe's built his own grist-mill/saw-mill and distillery. By the latter 1800s, Amherst acquired the title Sandstone Center of the World. (Note: Nearby Berea, Ohio proclaimed itself "The Grindstone Capital of the World".)

== Geography ==
Amherst is part of the Greater Cleveland area. Amherst is located 2.5 miles (4 km) south of Lake Erie.

According to the 2010 census, the city has a total area of 7.12 square miles (18.4 km^{2}), of which 7.06 square miles (18.3 km^{2}) (or 99.16%) is land and 0.06 square miles (0.16 km^{2}) (or 0.84%) is water.

=== Climate ===
Amherst possesses a humid continental climate (Köppen climate classification Dfa) typical of much of the Central United States, with very warm to hot, humid summers and cold winters with moderate snow.

Amherst is located in Hardiness Zone 6a/6b. A recent trend since the Hardiness rezoning is the discovery that certain tropical plants like the Needle Palm, Chinese Windmill Palm and Fiber Banana trees can grow in Amherst with some protection.

Climate data for Amherst, Ohio
| Month | Jan | Feb | Mar | Apr | May | Jun | Jul | Aug | Sep | Oct | Nov | Dec | Year |
|---|---|---|---|---|---|---|---|---|---|---|---|---|---|
| Mean daily maximum °F (°C) | 34 (1) | 36 (2) | 47 (8) | 58 (14) | 69 (21) | 80 (27) | 84 (29) | 81 (27) | 75 (24) | 65 (18) | 52 (11) | 39 (4) | 60 (16) |
| Mean daily minimum °F (°C) | 19 (−7) | 21 (−6) | 28 (−2) | 39 (4) | 48 (9) | 58 (14) | 62 (17) | 61 (16) | 55 (13) | 45 (7) | 37 (3) | 25 (−4) | 42 (5) |
| Average rainfall inches (mm) | 2.3 (58) | 2.1 (53) | 2.7 (69) | 3.3 (84) | 3.5 (89) | 3.9 (99) | 3.7 (94) | 3.6 (91) | 3.3 (84) | 2.5 (64) | 3.1 (79) | 2.7 (69) | 36.7 (930) |
| Average snowfall inches (cm) | 13.2 (34) | 11.8 (30) | 7.0 (18) | 1.1 (2.8) | 0.1 (0.25) | 0 (0) | 0 (0) | 0 (0) | 0 (0) | 0.1 (0.25) | 3.0 (7.6) | 11.0 (28) | 45.0 (114) |

== Demographics ==
Historical population
| Census | Pop. | Note | %± |
|---|---|---|---|
| 1880 | 1,542 | | — |
| 1890 | 1,648 | | 6.9% |
| 1900 | 1,758 | | 6.7% |
| 1910 | 2,106 | | 19.8% |
| 1920 | 2,485 | | 18.0% |
| 1930 | 2,844 | | 14.4% |
| 1940 | 2,896 | | 1.8% |
| 1950 | 3,542 | | 22.3% |
| 1960 | 6,750 | | 90.6% |
| 1970 | 9,902 | | 46.7% |
| 1980 | 10,620 | | 7.3% |
| 1990 | 10,332 | | −2.7% |
| 2000 | 11,797 | | 14.2% |
| 2010 | 12,021 | | 1.9% |
| 2020 | 12,681 | | 5.5% |
| 2023 (est.) | 12,928 | | 1.9% |
U.S. Decennial Census

=== 2020 census ===
As of the 2020 census, Amherst had a population of 12,681. The median age was 46.9 years. 20.2% of residents were under the age of 18 and 22.9% of residents were 65 years of age or older. For every 100 females there were 94.7 males, and for every 100 females age 18 and over there were 92.3 males age 18 and over.

99.7% of residents lived in urban areas, while 0.3% lived in rural areas.

There were 5,155 households in Amherst, of which 26.8% had children under the age of 18 living in them. Of all households, 55.2% were married-couple households, 14.9% were households with a male householder and no spouse or partner present, and 24.2% were households with a female householder and no spouse or partner present. About 25.5% of all households were made up of individuals and 13.3% had someone living alone who was 65 years of age or older.

There were 5,378 housing units, of which 4.1% were vacant. Among occupied housing units, 84.2% were owner-occupied and 15.8% were renter-occupied. The homeowner vacancy rate was 1.1% and the rental vacancy rate was 6.6%.

Racial composition as of the 2020 census
| Race | Number | Percent |
|---|---|---|
| White | 11,384 | 89.8% |
| Black or African American | 158 | 1.2% |
| American Indian and Alaska Native | 23 | 0.2% |
| Asian | 126 | 1.0% |
| Native Hawaiian and Other Pacific Islander | 3 | <0.1% |
| Some other race | 184 | 1.5% |
| Two or more races | 803 | 6.3% |
| Hispanic or Latino (of any race) | 807 | 6.4% |

=== 2010 census ===
As of the census of 2010, there were 12,021 people, 4,772 households, and 3,463 families residing in the city. The population density was 1,702.7 inhabitants per square mile (657.4/km^{2}). There were 5,031 housing units at an average density of 712.6 per square mile (275.1/km^{2}). The racial makeup of the city was 95.7% White, 0.7% African American, 0.2% Native American, 0.7% Asian, 1.0% from other races, and 1.7% from two or more races. Hispanic or Latino of any race were 5.3% of the population.

There were 4,772 households, of which 30.8% had children under the age of 18 living with them, 57.7% were married couples living together, 10.7% had a female householder with no husband present, 4.1% had a male householder with no wife present, and 27.4% were non-families. 23.7% of all households were made up of individuals, and 11.5% had someone living alone who was 65 years of age or older. The average household size was 2.50 and the average family size was 2.95.

The median age in the city was 45 years. 22.1% of residents were under the age of 18; 7.3% were between the ages of 18 and 24; 20.7% were from 25 to 44; 32.3% were from 45 to 64; and 17.8% were 65 years of age or older. The gender makeup of the city was 48.3% male and 51.7% female.

=== 2000 census ===
As of the census of 2000, there were 11,797 people, 4,459 households, and 3,388 families residing in the city. The population density was 1,646.1 inhabitants per square mile (635.6/km^{2}). There were 4,603 housing units at an average density of 642.3 per square mile (248.0/km^{2}). The racial makeup of the city was 96.84% White, 0.53% African American, 0.14% Native American, 0.73% Asian, 0.01% Pacific Islander, 0.78% from other races, and 0.98% from two or more races. Hispanic or Latino of any race were 2.93% of the population.

There were 4,459 households, out of which 34.4% had children under the age of 18 living with them, 65.6% were married couples living together, 7.9% had a female householder with no husband present, and 24.0% were non-families. Twenty-one.six percent of all households were made up of individuals, and 11.1% had someone living alone who was 65 years of age or older. The average household size was 2.61, and the average family size was 3.04.

In the city the population was spread out, with 26.0% under the age of 18, 5.6% from 18 to 24, 27.3% from 25 to 44, 25.4% from 45 to 64, and 15.7% who were 65 years of age or older. The median age was 40 years. For every 100 females, there were 92.2 males. For every 100 females age 18 and over, there were 87.9 males.

The median income for a household in the city was $53,516, and the median income for a family was $57,990. Males had a median income of $47,750 versus $27,880 for females. The per capita income for the city was $25,565. About 1.2% of families and 2.1% of the population were below the poverty line, including 0.3% of those under age 18 and 3.5% of those age 65 or over.

== Notable people ==
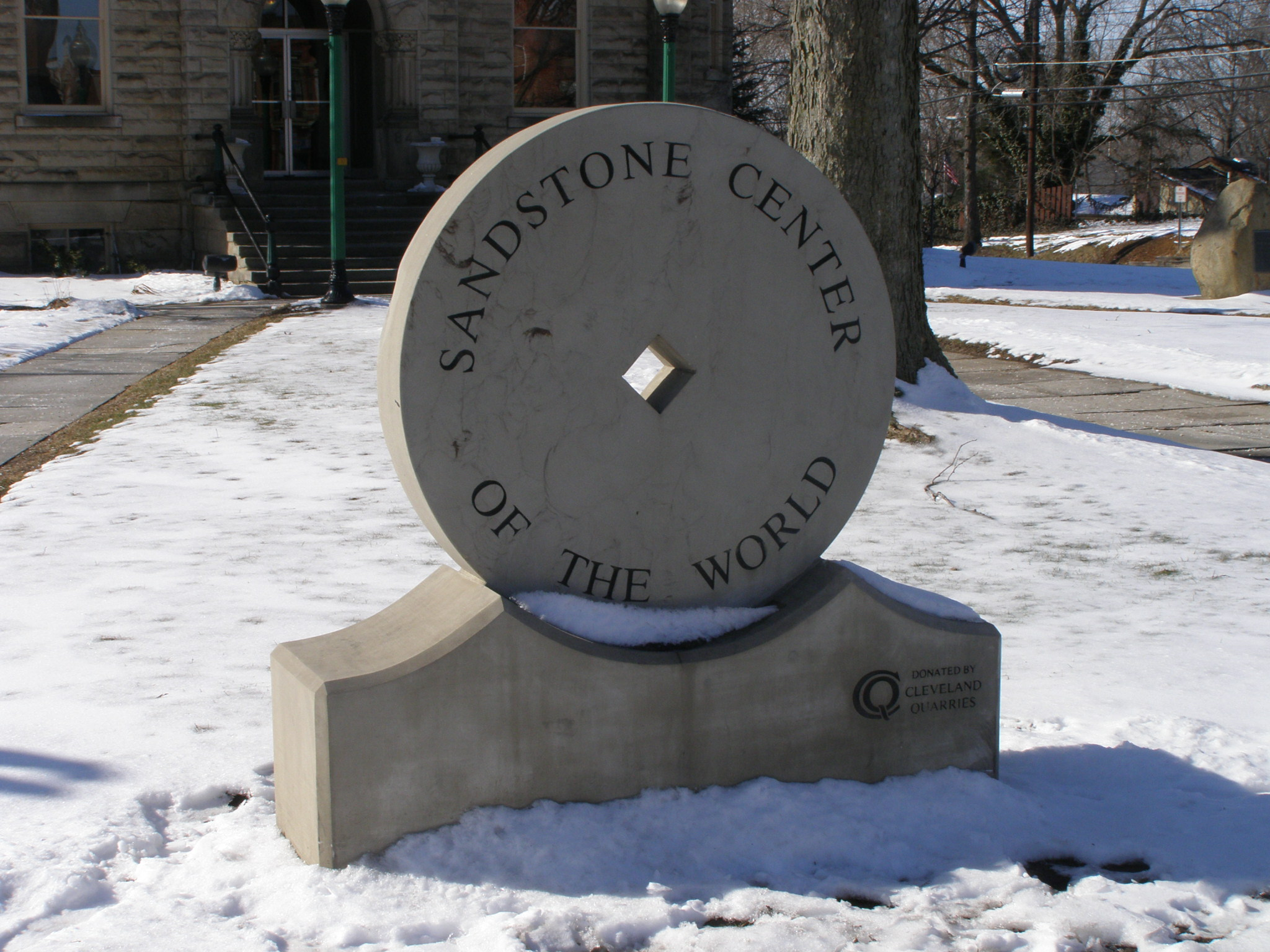
Amherst is known as the "Sandstone Center of the World"

- Guy Carlton, weightlifter, Olympic medal winner
- Mike Finley, author of over 110 books
- Jim Hayford, basketball head coach, Seattle University
- Joel Hills Johnson, inventor, Mormon pioneer, published poet and gospel hymn writer, politician and judge
- Mika Johnson, filmmaker and musician
- Jerry Lawler, professional wrestler and commentator
- John Penton, motorcycle enduro racer and member of the AMA Motorcycle Hall of Fame
- Ryan Rua, professional baseball player
- Henry Dwight Stratton, founder of Bryant & Stratton College
