= National Register of Historic Places listings in Ashland County, Ohio =

Location of Ashland County in Ohio

This is a list of the National Register of Historic Places listings in Ashland County, Ohio.

This is intended to be a complete list of the properties and districts on the National Register of Historic Places in Ashland County, Ohio, United States. The locations of National Register properties and districts for which the latitude and longitude coordinates are included below, may be seen in an online map.

There are 19 properties and districts listed on the National Register in the county. Another 2 properties were once listed but have been removed.

This National Park Service list is complete through NPS recent listings posted December 19, 2025.

== Current listings ==
	Name on the Register	Image	Date listed	Location	City or town	Description
1	Anderson Schoolhouse	Anderson Schoolhouse	March 25, 1977 (#77001040)	Southwest of Ashland on U.S. Route 42; 40°50′30″N 82°21′32″W	Milton Township	
2	Arthur Street School		February 18, 2021 (#100006147)	416 Arthur St. 40°52′00″N 82°18′40″W	Ashland	
3	Ashland County Children's Home	Ashland County Children's Home	June 17, 2019 (#100004059)	1260 Center St. 40°51′23″N 82°18′40″W	Ashland	
4	Ashland County Courthouse	Ashland County Courthouse	December 21, 1979 (#79003786)	W. 2nd St. 40°52′10″N 82°19′03″W	Ashland	
5	Philip J. Black House	Philip J. Black House	May 29, 1980 (#80002935)	303 N. Water St. 40°38′18″N 82°14′07″W	Loudonville	
6	T.J. and Sarah Bull House	T.J. and Sarah Bull House	April 12, 2007 (#07000302)	109 S. Market St. 40°38′06″N 82°14′00″W	Loudonville	
7	Center Street Historic District	Center Street Historic District	June 18, 1976 (#76001362)	Center St. from Vernon to 414 Center St.; also Center St. between Town Creek and Walnut St. and between Samaritan and Morgan Aves. 40°51′46″N 82°18′45″W	Ashland	Second set of boundaries represents a boundary increase of May 6, 1993
8	City Hall and Opera House	City Hall and Opera House	January 25, 1997 (#96001618)	156 N. Water St. 40°38′11″N 82°14′05″W	Loudonville	
9	Crittenden Farm	Crittenden Farm	April 22, 1982 (#82003540)	Northwest of Savannah on U.S. Routes 224 and 250; 41°01′43″N 82°25′37″W	Ruggles Township	
10	John Crumrine Farm	John Crumrine Farm	December 7, 1990 (#90001778)	792 County Road 40 north of Nova; 41°03′29″N 82°16′50″W	Troy Township	
11	Michael Crumrine Farm	Michael Crumrine Farm	December 7, 1990 (#90001779)	871 County Road 40 north of Nova; 41°03′27″N 82°17′42″W	Troy Township	
12	Downtown Ashland Historic District	Downtown Ashland Historic District	January 23, 2013 (#12001209)	Roughly bounded by Cottage-Claremont Ave., 3rd, 4th, and Union Sts., and Town Creek; 40°52′08″N 82°18′56″W	Ashland	
13	John Garst House	John Garst House	April 29, 1982 (#82003539)	Northeast of Loudonville on State Route 95; 40°43′40″N 82°11′52″W	Mohican Township	
14	Hayesville Opera House	Hayesville Opera House	May 6, 1976 (#76001364)	1 E. Main St. 40°46′23″N 82°15′42″W	Hayesville	
15	William Kelley Hardware Store-Hayesville Odd Fellows Hall	William Kelley Hardware Store-Hayesville Odd Fellows Hall	February 14, 2017 (#100000662)	7 E. Main St. 40°46′23″N 82°15′42″W	Hayesville	
16	Lakefork School	Lakefork School	March 5, 1982 (#82003538)	Southeast of Jeromesville; 40°45′17″N 82°08′47″W	Mohican Township	
17	Myers Block-Home Company Building	Myers Block-Home Company Building	February 5, 1997 (#96001620)	1 E. Main St. 40°52′06″N 82°18′53″W	Ashland	
18	Sprott's Hill Mounds Site	Sprott's Hill Mounds Site	January 31, 1976 (#76001363)	Western side of Township Road 1193 between Bailey Lake and Ashland; 40°54′49″N 82°21′42″W	Clear Creek Township	Two mounds, located on Sprott's Hill
19	Vermillion Institute	Vermillion Institute	March 29, 1978 (#78002000)	Main and College Sts. 40°46′26″N 82°15′20″W	Hayesville	

== Former listings ==
	Name on the Register	Image	Date listed	Date removed	Location	City or town	Description
1	Ashland County Jail		December 12, 1976 (#76001361)	February 27, 1978	W. 2nd and Cottage Streets; 40°52′10″N 82°19′05″W	Ashland	Demolished in February and March, 1978.
2	First National Bank and Firestone Building		August 5, 1976 (#76002288)	May 23, 1978	2-10 W. Main Street; 40°52′08″N 82°18′55″W	Ashland	Demolished in March 1978.

== See also ==
- List of National Historic Landmarks in Ohio
- Listings in neighboring counties: Holmes, Huron, Knox, Lorain, Medina, Richland, Wayne
- National Register of Historic Places listings in Ohio
