= Ashland County Courthouse =

Ashland County Courthouse may refer to:

- Ashland County Courthouse (Ohio)
- Ashland County Courthouse (Wisconsin)
