= Centre Street =

Centre Street or Center Street may refer to:

== Places ==
=== Canada ===
- Centre Street (Calgary), Alberta
  - Centre Street station (Calgary)
- Centre Street, part of York Regional Road 71, Ontario

=== Hong Kong ===
- Centre Street (Hong Kong)
- Centre Street (constituency)

=== United States ===
- Centre Street (Baltimore)
  - Mt. Vernon station (Light RailLink), formerly known as Centre Street station
- Centre Street (Manhattan), New York
- Center Street Historic District (disambiguation), the name of 2 places in the U.S.
- Center/Main Street station, Mesa, Arizona, U.S.
- Ohio State Route 615, known as Center Street for much of its length

== Other uses ==
- Center Street (publisher), an imprint of Hachette Book Group

== See also ==
- 100 Centre Street, an American legal drama
