= Loudonville =

Loudonville may refer to:

- Loudonville, New York
- Loudonville, Ohio
