= Peter Reinhard =

Peter Reinhard (1827–?) was a gunsmith and marksman operating out of Loudonville, Ohio during the mid-19th century. He became famous for the quality of his muzzle-loading rifles and for his prowess in shooting competitions. His rifles remain popular with collectors today.

== Early years ==
Peter Reinhard was born in the Kingdom of Bavaria on June 1, 1827. He spent his early childhood there and then immigrated to the United States when he was five years old. It was then that his family took up residence in Columbus, Ohio. It was in Columbus that he got an apprenticeship with gunsmith Cornelius Jacobs and he never looked back. In 1849 he married Katherine Klee and moved to the small town of Loudonville.

== Career ==
As soon as he moved to Loudonville, Reinhard set up his gun shop and began to make and repair guns. During his early years he became quite adept at building and repairing muzzle-loading rifles. These were the main guns in use at the time, and he became one of the best at both building and shooting them. As his notoriety grew, his shop on North Water Street became one of Loudonville's main attractions.

== Notoriety ==
Reinhard was known not only for his guns, but also for his ability to shoot them. He was one of the greatest shooters in his area and also won many national competitions, including the 1877 National Shoot. He also only used his guns in his contests. He would never use a gun in a competition unless he had made it himself.

The Reinhard muzzle-loader is one of the finest of its kind. During Reinhard's lifetime, one of his muzzle-loaders would sell for between fifty and seventy-five dollars. In contrast, a typical muzzle-loader cost between seven and fifteen dollars. However, when lever-action guns were invented, the popularity of his muzzle-loaders faded. The new lever-action guns could shoot much faster and be reloaded more quickly, which made them better for hunting.

== Popularity today ==
Reinhard's muzzle-loading rifles are still popular today. Because of their early success, many people maintained them in good condition. There are many people who collect them because of their value and quality. Today, there is a P.A. Reinhard Muzzle-Loading Rifle Club.
