= Vernon Redding =

American architect

- Born: October 7, 1866 - December 22, 1939
- Occupation: Architect

Vernon Redding (October 7, 1866 – December 23, 1939) was an architect in Mansfield, Ohio. He designed the Ashland County Courthouse (Ohio), Huron County Courthouse and Jail (1913) and one or more buildings in the Center Street Historic District (Ashland, Ohio). He also designed Mansfield's Carnegie library built in 1908. Several buildings he designed are listed on the National Register of Historic Places (NRHP).

Herbert S. Jones and William L. Althouse, who went on to form Althouse & Jones, began their careers working for Redding.

== Work ==
- A. C. Edmondson Residence at 297 Mt. Vernon Avenue in Marion, Ohio.
- Adam Howard House at 230 South Boston Street in Galion, Ohio. NRHP listed
- Citizens Bank of Shelby, 1911 29 W Main St in Shelby, OH
- City Hall and Opera House, 156 N. Water St. in Loudonville, Ohio. NRHP listed
- May Realty Building at 22-32 South Park Street in Mansfield. NRHP listed
- Ohio Power Company building at 604 Main Street in Zanesville, Ohio. NRHP listed
- Mansfield Savings Bank building NRHP listed
- 2-story brick business block in Loudenville
- Ohio Theatre in Loudonville NRHP listed
- Farmers Bank Building, now Chase Bank
- Leland Hotel, formerly the tallest building in Mansfield (demolished in 1976)
- Barrington Building
- The Rigby House NRHP listed
- Balgreen Farm house on Marion Avenue Road
- The Kern House
- Central United Methodist
- Mansfield General Hospital
- Clubhouse at Westbrook
- Ashland County Courthouse at W. 2nd St. in Ashland, Ohio. NRHP listed
- Huron County Courthouse and Jail on E. Main St. and Benedict Avenue in Norwalk, Ohio. NRHP listed.

== See also ==
- National Register of Historic Places listings in Richland County, Ohio
