= Ashland City School District =

School district in Ohio, United States

Address
- 1407 Claremont Avenue Ashland, Ohio, 44805; United States

District information
- Type: Public
- Grades: PK–12
- Schools: 5
- NCES District ID: 3904350

Students and staff
- Students: 3,007 (2025–2026)
- Teachers: 164.00 (on an FTE basis) (2025–2026)
- Staff: 441.66 (on an FTE basis) (2025–2026)
- Student–teacher ratio: 18.34 (2025–2026)

Other information
- Website: www.ashlandcityschools.org

Ashland City School District is a public school district serving students in the city of Ashland, Montgomery Township, Milton Township, and parts of Perry Township in Ashland County, Ohio, United States. The school district enrolls 3,717 students as of the 2008–2009 academic year.

== Schools ==
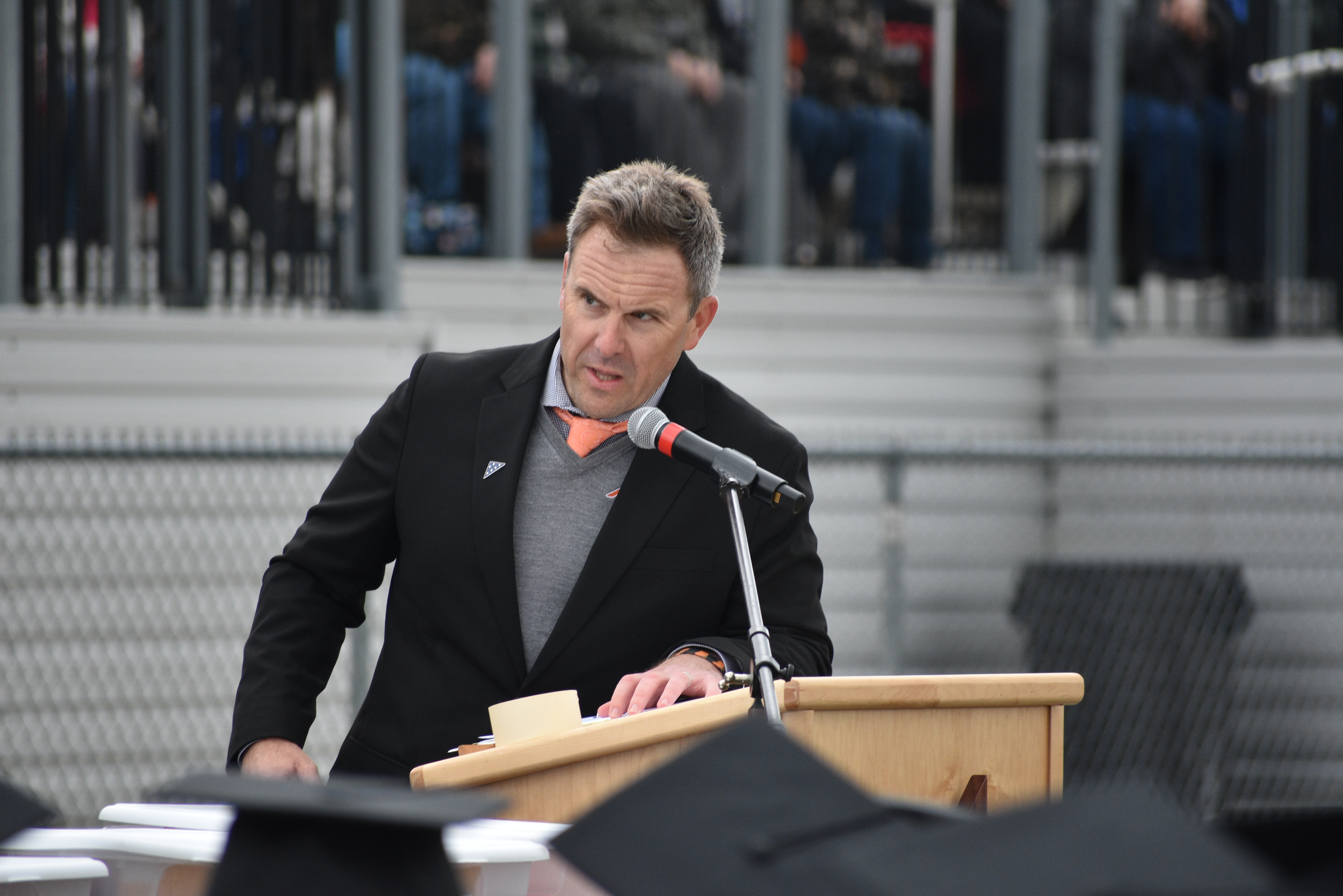
Steve Paramore, district superintendent, speaking at Ashland High School's 2025 graduation

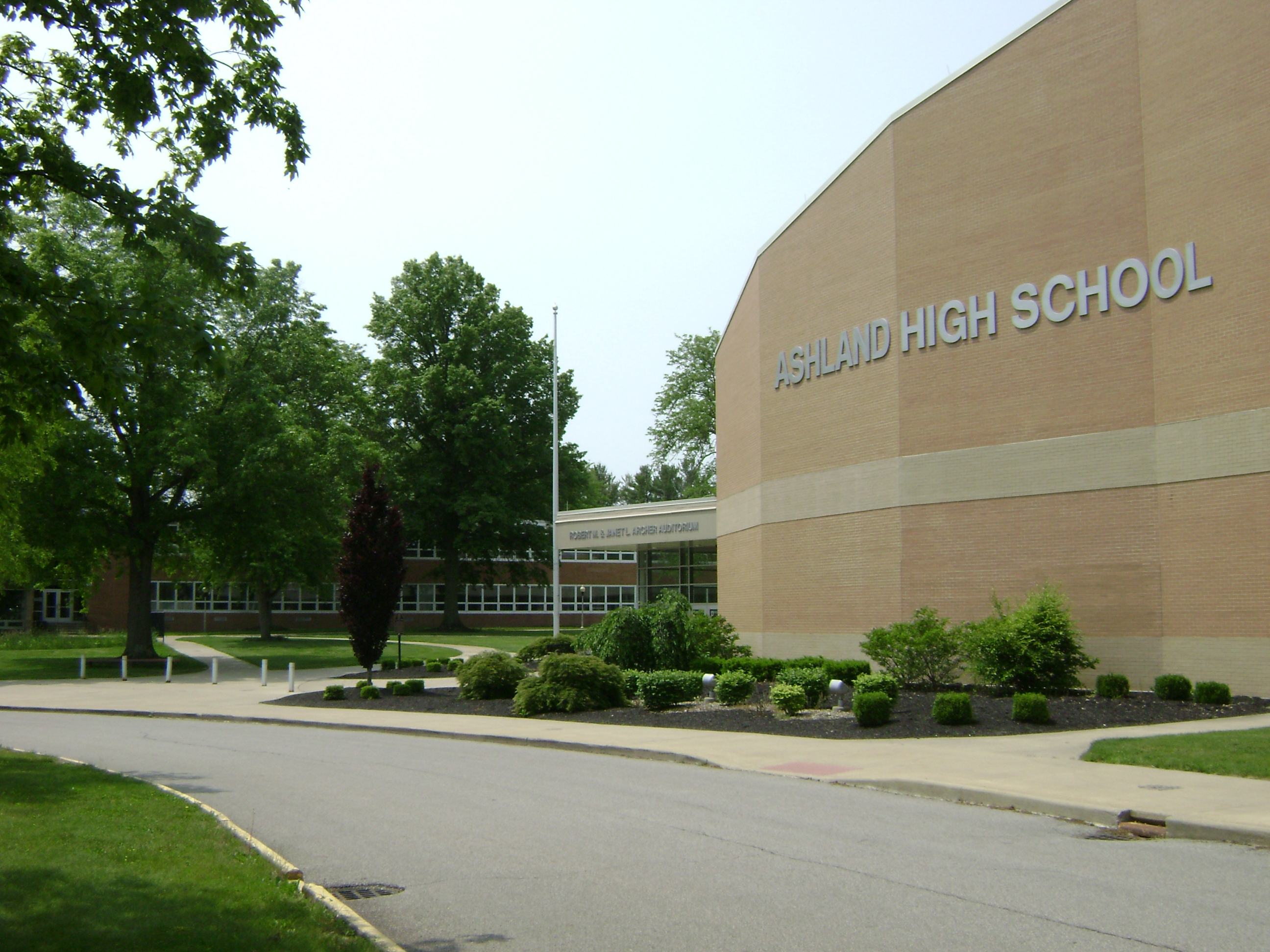
Ashland High School

=== Elementary schools ===
- Edison Elementary School (Grades Pre-K through 3rd)
- Reagan Elementary School (Grades Pre-K through 3rd)

=== Intermediate schools ===
- Taft Intermediate School (Grades 4th and 5th)

=== Middle schools ===
- Ashland Middle School (Grades 6th, 7th and 8th)

=== High schools ===
- Ashland High School (Grades 9th through 12th)

=== Former schools ===
- Arthur Street School (416 Arthur Street) - built in 1907-1908 and 1940, closed for good in 1981. Was also the Ashland Alternative School until it closed for good in May 2015. Demolition on the former Arthur Street School/former Walnut Street School/former Ashland Alternative School is pending.
- Ashland Alternative School (416 Arthur Street) - was housed in the former Arthur Street School/former Walnut Street School until it closed for good in May 2015. Grades 9th through 12th were attending at the Ashland Alternative School. Demolition is pending on the former Arthur Street School/former Walnut Street School/former Ashland Alternative School.
- Ashland Middle School (345 Cottage Street) - built in 1914, 1924, 1938 and 1943, closed for good in May 2015 and was demolished in March 2016. Was formerly Ashland Junior High and was also formerly Ashland High School number 2 when it was built in 1914.
- East Fourth Street School (380 East Fourth Street) - built in 1880 and closed for good in 1922. The old East Fourth Street School today is called the Frank Miller Memorial Building.
- Grant Street School (Grant Street at College Avenue) - Grant Street School number 1 was built in 1889 and was demolished in 1998. Grant Street School number 2 was built in 1922, 1940 and was demolished in 1998.
- Lincoln Elementary School (30 West 11th Street) - built in 1911, 1939 and 1960, closed for good in 2013 and was demolished in October 2015.
- Montgomery Elementary School (725 US Highway 250 East) - built in 1939, 1950 and 1955, closed for good in May 2015 and was demolished in August 2015.
- Osborn Elementary School (544 East Main Street) - built in 1949, closed for good in May 2015 and was demolished in November 2015.
- Pleasant Street School (317 Pleasant Street) - Was the former Administration Building after school closed in 1998. Pleasant Street School number 1 was built in 1871 and was demolished in 1911. Pleasant Street School number 2 was built in 1911 and closed for good in 1998. Pleasant Street School number 3 was built in 1939 and closed for good in 1998.
