= Ohio Theatre (Loudonville, Ohio) =

Coordinates: 40°38′12″N 82°14′05″W

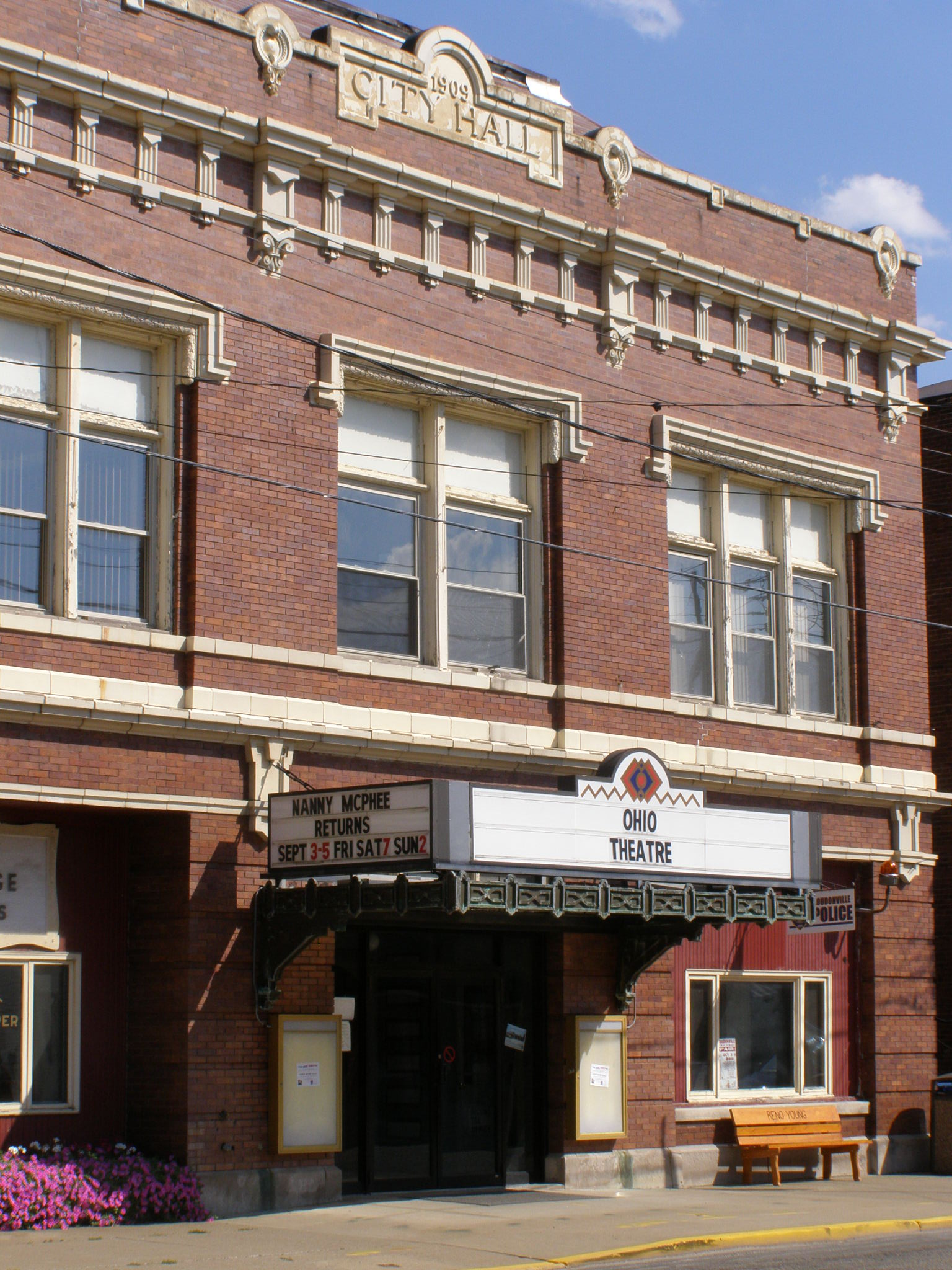

The Ohio Theatre is a historic theater in Loudonville, Ohio. It is one of many theaters in the state named "Ohio Theatre". It is at 156 North Water Street and was built on the site of the town's first theatrical building of 1874. In 1997 it was named in the National Register of Historic Places, under the name of "City Hall and Opera House".

The current building built during 1909–1910 cost the city just over $33,000 and was financed by a 5% bond system. It was designed by Mansfield architect Vernon Redding. The building was multi-functional when it opened its doors in 1911 at the time housing the Ohio village offices, its fire department and its jail on the first floor. On the second floor was the council chambers, police department, and a public library.

Finally at the rear of the building stood the Opera House with its 700 seats. That Opera House was used for civic gatherings, cultural events and various forms of live entertainment.

== 1909 to 1980s ==
The building was erected in 1909 and operated as a fire station before it was converted into a theater in 1910 and being renamed "The Opera House."

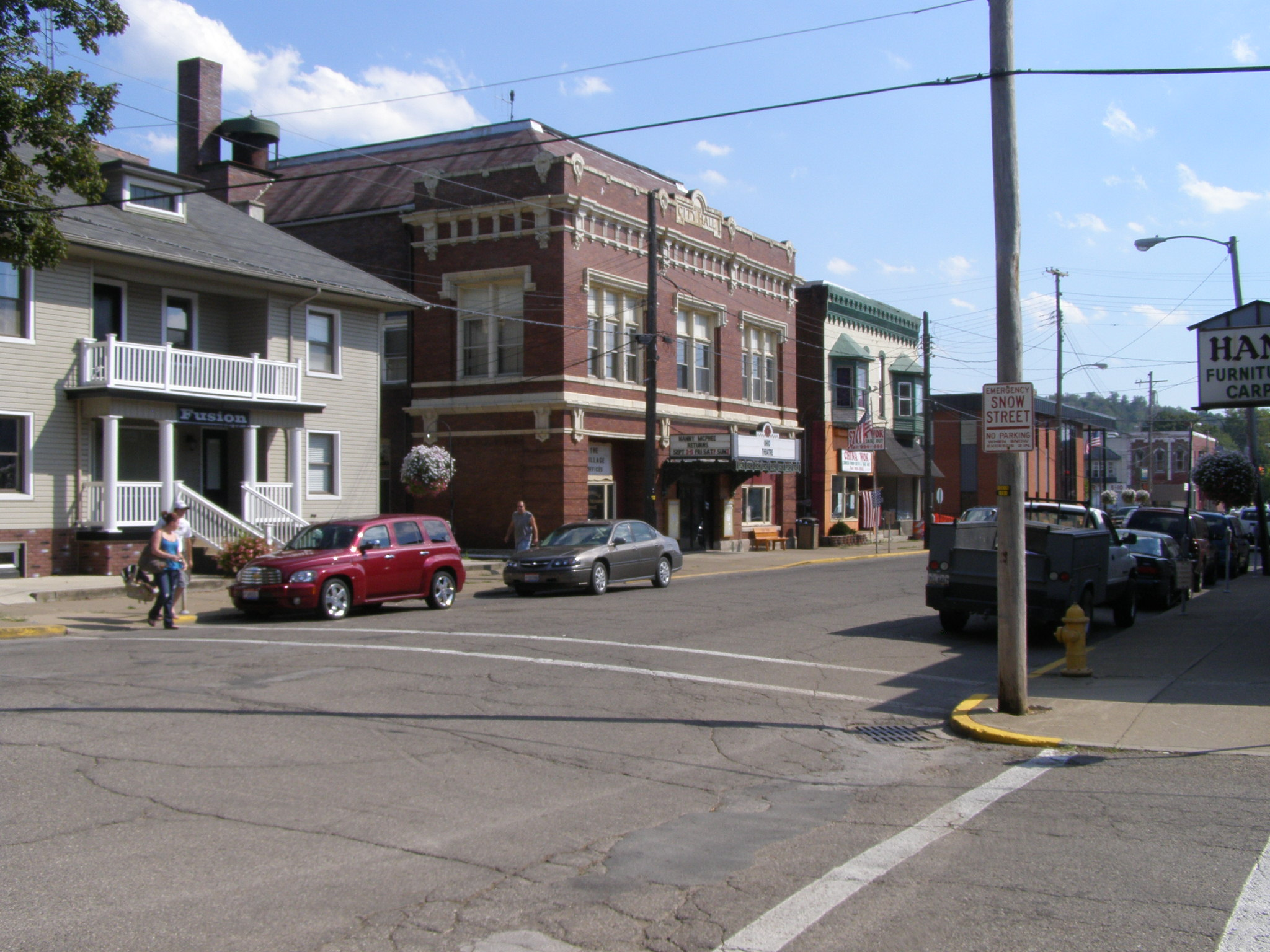

On its opening day of December 27, 1910, the Opera House featured a special scenic and electrical show titled, The Flaming Arrow which had been preceded by a street parade as well as a free concert featuring the town band. In 1916, Neptune's Daughter was the first motion picture to be shown at the Opera House. In 1931, under new management, it was renamed the Ohio Theater. In the 1940s the theater provided a few hours of entertainment during World War II.

== 1990s to present ==
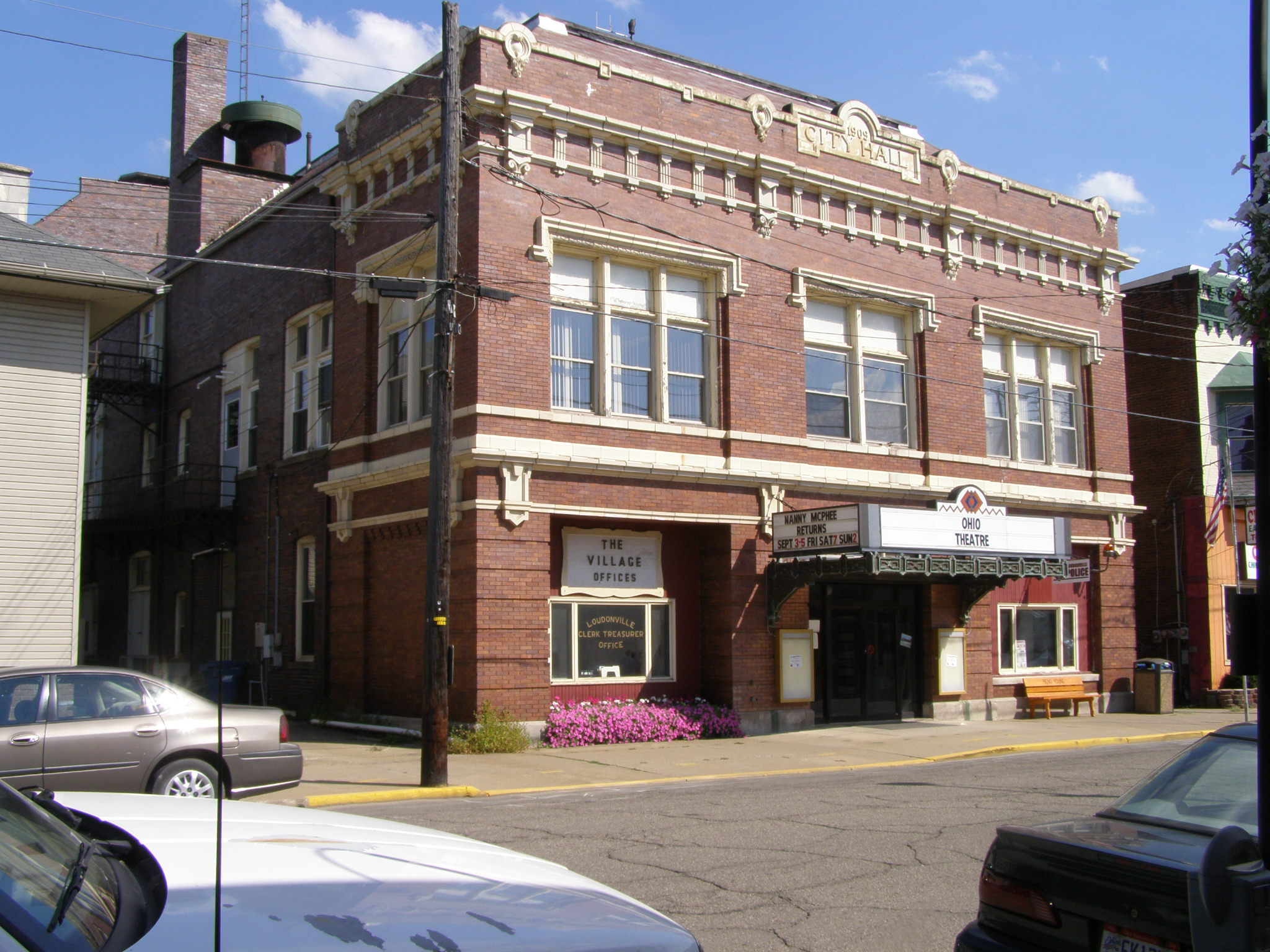

In 1991, the Mohican Area League of Arts had hundreds of volunteers paint, clean, and refurnished the theater, and re-opened with the premiere of Dick Tracy.

Then, in 1997, the National Register of Historic Places announced that the Ohio Theater would be preserved for all time. The same year, the city lost Merilliat Industries, a company whose loss cost the city $30,000 in tax revenue. The Loudonville Board of Recreation took over the theater in 1997, but due to the loss of revenue and a drop in attendance, the last film was slated to be Harry Potter and the Sorcerer's Stone. However, three local freshman girls raised $4,000 in a local talent show to get new balcony seats and electrical work. And the next year, LTAC (Loudonville Theater Arts Committee), which was headed by Kerry MacQueen, raised over $5,000 in a day-long event of performances, tours and a showing of The Wizard of Oz, and later in the evening they showed the same film with the soundtrack The Dark Side of the Moon. Ten years later, the theater is still going strong, providing multiple entertainment opportunities including the Loudonville High School Drama Club musicals.

The Ohio Theater is run by the City of Loudonville, Ohio, and in 2009 the Ohio Theater celebrated its 100th anniversary.

== See also ==
- National Register of Historic Places listings in Ashland County, Ohio
