= Ashland High School (Ohio) =

Public school in Ashland, Ohio, United States

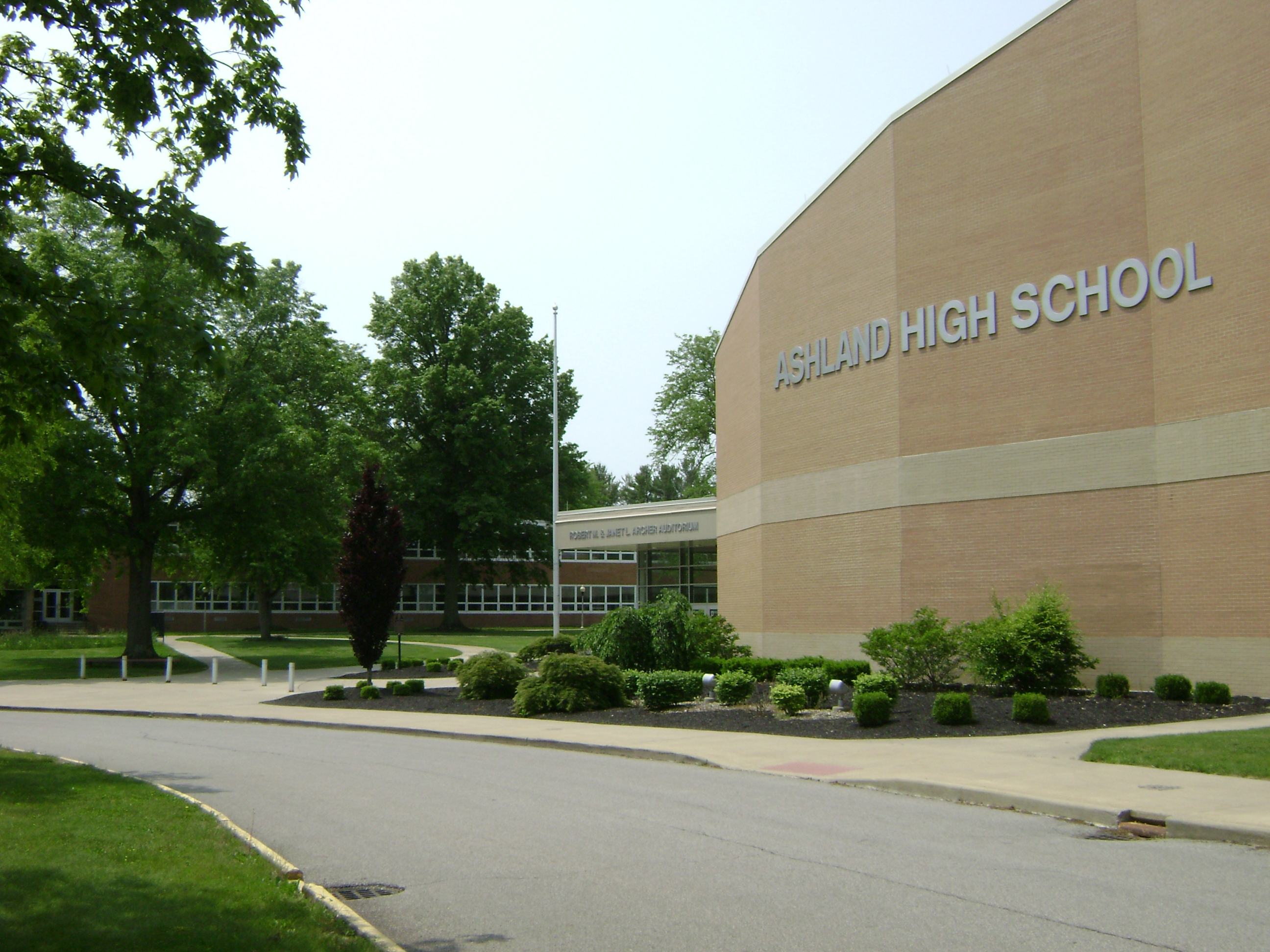
- Ashland High School building Arry the Arrow, the school's mascot

Location
- 1440 King Road; Ashland, (Ashland County), Ohio 44805; United States; 40°51′12″N 82°19′26″W

Information
- Type: Public
- Established: 11 November 1962
- School district: Ashland City School District
- Superintendent: Steve Paramore
- Principal: Josh Packard
- Teaching staff: 50.83 (FTE)
- Grades: 9–12
- Enrollment: 892 (2023-2024)
- Average class size: 21
- Student to teacher ratio: 17.55
- Colors: Black and orange
- Song: Hail! Ashland High School
- Athletics: Yes
- Mascot: Arry the Arrow
- Team name: Arrows
- Rival: Lexington Minutemen
- Newspaper: Panorama
- Yearbook: Guide
- Website: School Website

Ashland High School (AHS) is the only high school of the Ashland City School District of Ashland, Ohio.

== Athletics ==
Ashland High School has a long tradition in sports, especially baseball, basketball, soccer, volleyball, track and field, football and golf. The boys' varsity golf team is notable for having won the only state championships recorded in school history, in 1962 and 1998. In 2008, the boys' and girls' golf teams advanced to the OHSAA Division 1 State Golf Championships. The girls' team returned to the championships in 2009, where senior Rachel Thompson received runner-up medalist honors.

=== Ohio High School Athletic Association State Championships ===
- Boys Bowling - 2025
- Boys' Golf – 1962, 1998

== Notable alumni ==
- Ernest Cline – novelist and screenwriter.
- John Roseboro – former MLB player (Los Angeles Dodgers, Minnesota Twins, Washington Senators)
- Tim Seder – former National Football League player with the Dallas Cowboys and Jacksonville Jaguars
- Robert Springer – NASA astronaut
