= Loudonville Flour Mill =

Flour mill in Ohio, United States

Coordinates: 40°38′46″N 82°14′30″W

Loudonville, Ohio is positioned along the Black Fork River, which makes it an ideal location for a mill. Although names, ownership, and even buildings have changed over the years, there has been a mill operating in the same spot in town since 1818.

== Skinner's Mill ==
In 1818, Alex Skinner built the first mill along the Black Fork River in Loudonville. The mill flourished, and in 1861 it was acquired by Augustus Taylor, who expanded the business and doubled production capacity. Taylor hired a man named Jacob Stitzel, who discovered a way to produce a high grade of flour. His "patent flour" was made using a burr grinder, a process that remained a mystery to many other millers until the introduction of roller mills revolutionized the industry. In 1876, Stitzel oversaw a display of patent flour at the Philadelphia Centennial. Eventually, his flour became the national standard, and it continues to be the main form of flour used in the United States.

== Northwestern Milling and Elevator Company ==
After Taylor's death, the Northwestern Milling and Elevator Company (as it was then known) hired H.J. BeBout to modernize the facilities. BeBout increased production to 350 barrels per day and storage capacity to over 65,000 bushels before leading a group of local investors to purchase the mill. A 1913 flood heavily damaged the mill, but BeBout remodeled it in 1914 and 1916, doubling the production and storage capability.

== Setbacks, Growth, and the Mill Today ==
The mill was the largest and most modern in the state until November 1922, when a fire destroyed everything except the cement storage units. Because the loss was only partly covered by insurance, about 50 men lost their jobs in the aftermath of the fire. H.J. BeBout immediately set about building a new, bigger, even more modern mill, which successfully operated for many years under the title Loudonville Milling Company. In 1947, the mill was purchased by Standard Milling Company. In the 1980s it was sold to Sunshine Biscuit Company and then to ConAgra Mills, under which management it continues to operate today.
