= Anderson Schoolhouse =

- U.S. National Register of Historic Places
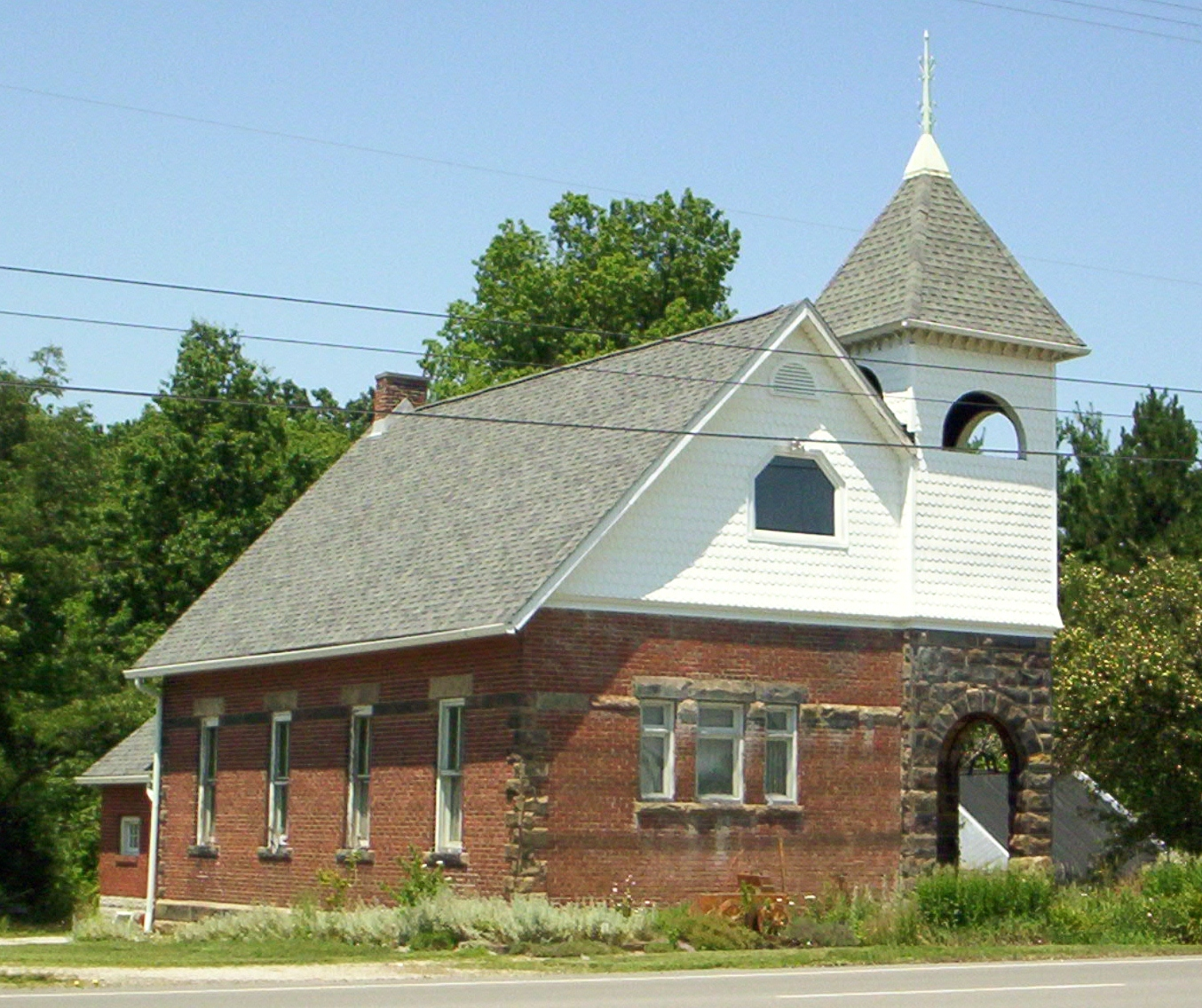
- A view of Anderson Schoolhouse in July 2012.

- Location within Ohio Location within the United States
- Nearest city: Ashland, Ohio
- Coordinates: 40°50′30″N 82°21′32″W
- NRHP reference No.: 77001040
- Added to NRHP: 1977-03-25

Anderson Schoolhouse is a registered historic building near Ashland, Ohio, listed in the National Register of Historic Places on 1977-03-25. It is located at 1202 US 42 South, in Milton Township, Ashland County, Ohio. It was known as the No. 5 district out of seven in the township.

It is the only one-room schoolhouse in Ashland County and the only building in Milton Township on the National Register. In 1976 a restoration committee researched the schoolhouse and completed the application process for the National Register. Mrs. Carlton (Ruth) Emmons served as chairman of this committee with Mrs. Joe (Lois) Oberholtzer as secretary, John Rowe as treasurer, and Harry (Bill) Fox, Robert Frey, and Mrs. Robert Thompson as members.

The land for the schoolhouse was given from the farm of Albert Fike, but the building in the National Register of Historic Places is not the first schoolhouse built on the property. An original, likely wooden, schoolhouse could have existed on the property as early as 1850, the year the Union School plan was adopted by Ashland County. A notice of a democratic meeting to take place in the Anderson schoolhouse appeared in the Ashland Union newspaper in 1859. The Anderson schoolhouse also appears on maps from 1861.

A brick structure with a slate roof and locally quarried stone was built on this site in 1889. This building burned down on November 22, 1899. By February 1900, a contract for building a new brick schoolhouse was awarded to Tinsley and Tobias. This schoolhouse was finished in spring 1900 and is the Anderson Schoolhouse that stands today. The building is essentially square and made of brick, sandstone, and wood. Described as “unusually ornate” for a one-room school house, it features a three-staged bell tower with archways on bottom and a roof shaped like a pyramid. It has an addition on the back and electricity, but it still does not have indoor plumbing. The original bell is missing.

The 1938–39 school year was the last time students were taught in the Anderson Schoolhouse because the school consolidated into Ashland City School District. Hilda Carpenter, who taught grades 1–4, was the last teacher in this school. Glenn Messner also taught grades 5-8 that year but in a different building. L. L. Garber, an English professor at Ashland College purchased the building in 1941 for $75.00. On September 15, 1946, he sold it to the Anderson Community Club, Inc. for $200.00. It was used for its club meetings and sometimes by some 4-H clubs and was available for rental. Ruth Emmons purchased the building from the Anderson Community Club and ran her business, Thymes Past, from it until 2014.

Two Ashland University education professors, Dr. Jason Ellis and Dr. Carla Abreu-Ellis, purchased the house from Emmons in September 2014. The restored, one-room school now serves as a museum, “providing immersive living history experiences to children of all ages.” Field trips allow school children, who are encouraged to wear period clothing, to reenact a nineteenth-century school day.
