= Huron County Courthouse and Jail =

Local government building in the United States

- U.S. National Register of Historic Places
- U.S. Historic district
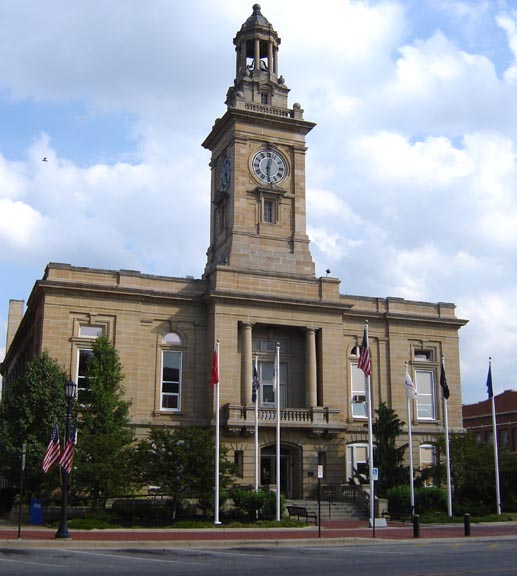
- Courthouse in 2007

- Location within Ohio Location within the United States
- Interactive map showing the location for Huron County Courthouse and Jail
- Location: E. Main St. and Benedict Ave., Norwalk, Ohio
- Coordinates: 41°14′31″N 82°36′55″W
- Built: 1913
- Architect: Vernon Redding
- Architectural style: Renaissance, Queen Anne
- NRHP reference No.: 74001534
- Added to NRHP: July 12, 1974

The Huron County Courthouse and Jail is located by a busy downtown intersection in Norwalk, Ohio, United States. The ground floor is composed of rusticated blocks and recessed arched windows. The entrance is reached by a flight of stairs and a protruding portico. Two small windows frame either side of the entrance.

The county's first courthouse and jail were completed in 1819, occupying the site of the present buildings; two later courthouses and one later jail were constructed on the same site before giving way to its present occupants. Both buildings are masonry. The courthouse being a stone Neo-Renaissance structure and the sheriff's-residence-and-jail being a brick Queen Anne building. A central tower distinguishes the courthouse from the surrounding commercial district, while smaller architectural features include columns in the form known as distyle in antis. Typical of its style, the jail lacks a uniform shape, its roof reflecting the asymmetrical floor plan. Pilasters divide the facade of the courthouse into five bays, and the side into ten, while a prominent belt course divides the first and second stories. A large clock is set into the tower, with a pillared cupola set above. Behind the courthouse, the jail is distinguished by the steep conical roof covering its two-story tower; while the base of the roof sits at the same level as the middle of the courthouse's second-story windows, the conical roof rises well above the courthouse roof.

In 1974, the courthouse and jail were listed together on the National Register of Historic Places as a historic district, one of six National Register-listed locations in the city of Norwalk and one of seventeen countywide.
