= Center Street Historic District =

Center Street Historic District may refer to:

- Center Street Historic District (Birmingham, Alabama), listed on the National Register of Historic Places (NRHP) in Birmingham, Alabama
- Center Street Historic District (Ashland, Ohio), NRHP-listed

== See also ==
- South Center Street Historic District, Arlington, Texas, NRHP-listed in Tarrant County
- Logan Center Street Historic District, Logan, Utah, NRHP-listed in Cache County
