= Milton Township, Ashland County, Ohio =

Township in Ohio, US

- Township
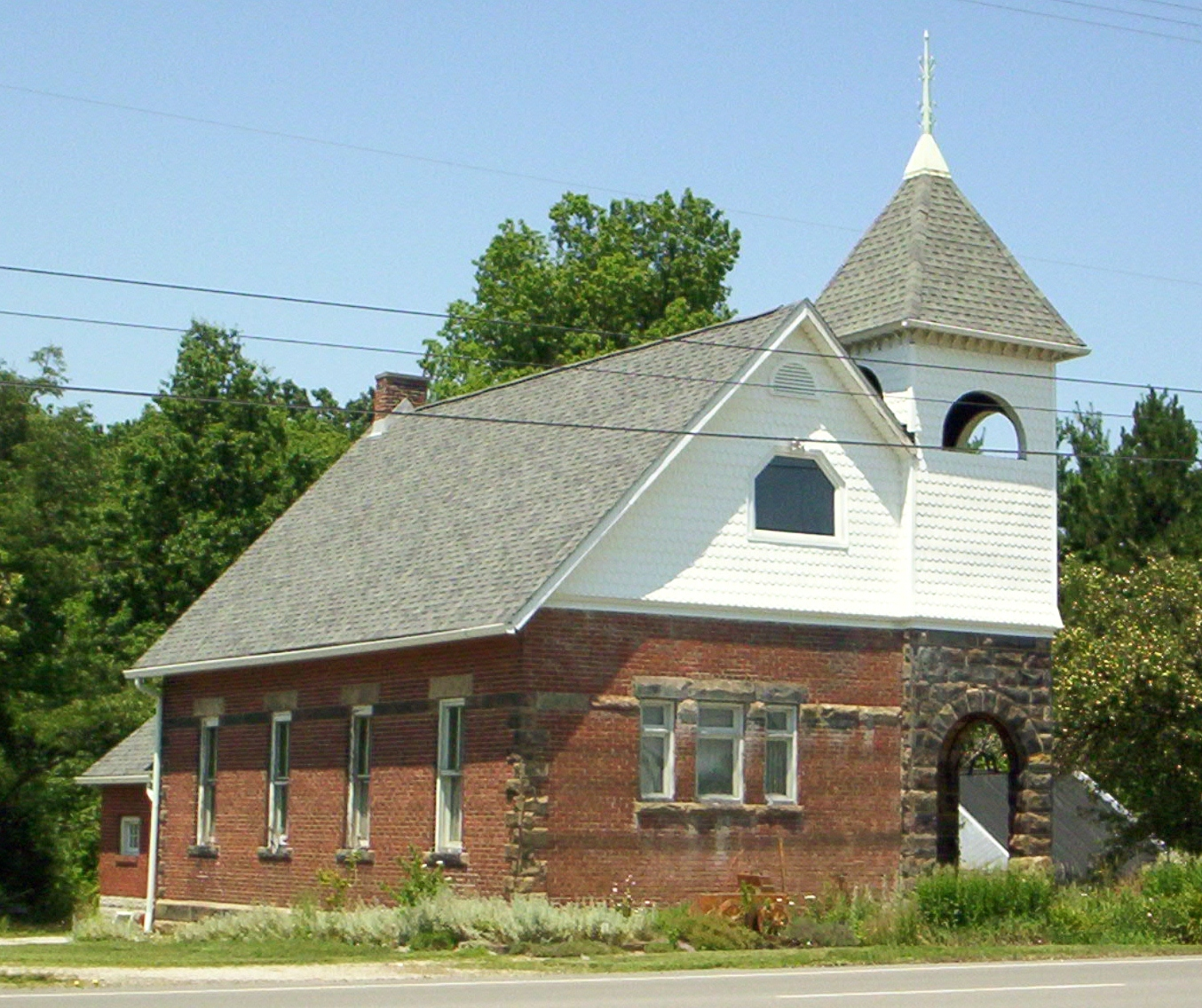
- The Anderson Schoolhouse, built 1900

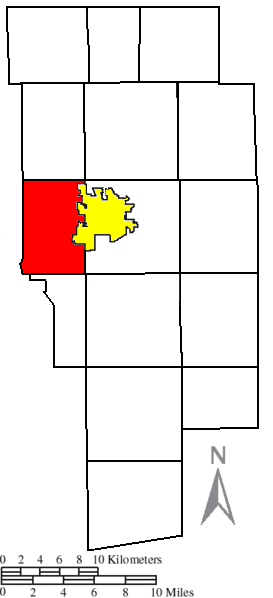
- Location of Milton Township (red) adjacent to the city of Ashland (yellow) in Ashland County
- Coordinates: 40°51′5″N 82°22′31″W
- Country: United States
- State: Ohio
- County: Ashland

Area
  - Total: 22.7 sq mi (58.9 km^{2})
  - Land: 22.7 sq mi (58.7 km^{2})
  - Water: 0.077 sq mi (0.2 km^{2})
- Elevation: 1,260 ft (384 m)

Population (2020)
  - Total: 2,357
  - Density: 105/sq mi (40.6/km^{2})
- Time zone: UTC-5 (Eastern (EST))
  - Summer (DST): UTC-4 (EDT)
- FIPS code: 39-50610
- GNIS feature ID: 1085709
- Website: www.miltontownshipashlandohio.com

Milton Township is one of the fifteen townships of Ashland County, Ohio, United States. The population was 2,357 at the 2020 census.

== Geography ==
Located in the western part of the county, it borders the following townships:

- Clear Creek Township - north
- Orange Township - northeast corner
- Montgomery Township - east
- Vermillion Township - southeast corner
- Mifflin Township - south
- Mifflin Township, Richland County - southwest corner
- Weller Township, Richland County - west
- Butler Township, Richland County - northwest corner

Part of the city of Ashland, the county seat of Ashland County, is located in eastern Milton Township.

== Name and history ==
Milton Township was organized in 1816 and originally included two geographic townships.

Milton Township was reduced to six miles square when Clear Creek Township was organized from the north half of Milton Township on 15 October 1818. Upon the formation of Ashland County in 1846, Milton Township was again divided, four columns of sections on the east being included in Ashland County, the other two columns remaining in Richland. The last division reduced the township to its present dimensions—four by six miles.

It is one of five Milton Townships statewide.

== Government ==
The township is governed by a three-member board of trustees, who are elected in November of odd-numbered years to a four-year term beginning on the following January 1. Two are elected in the year after the presidential election and one is elected in the year before it. There is also an elected township fiscal officer, who serves a four-year term beginning on April 1 of the year after the election, which is held in November of the year before the presidential election. Vacancies in the fiscal officership or on the board of trustees are filled by the remaining trustees.
