= Ashland County Courthouse (Ohio) =

Local government building in the United States

- U.S. National Register of Historic Places
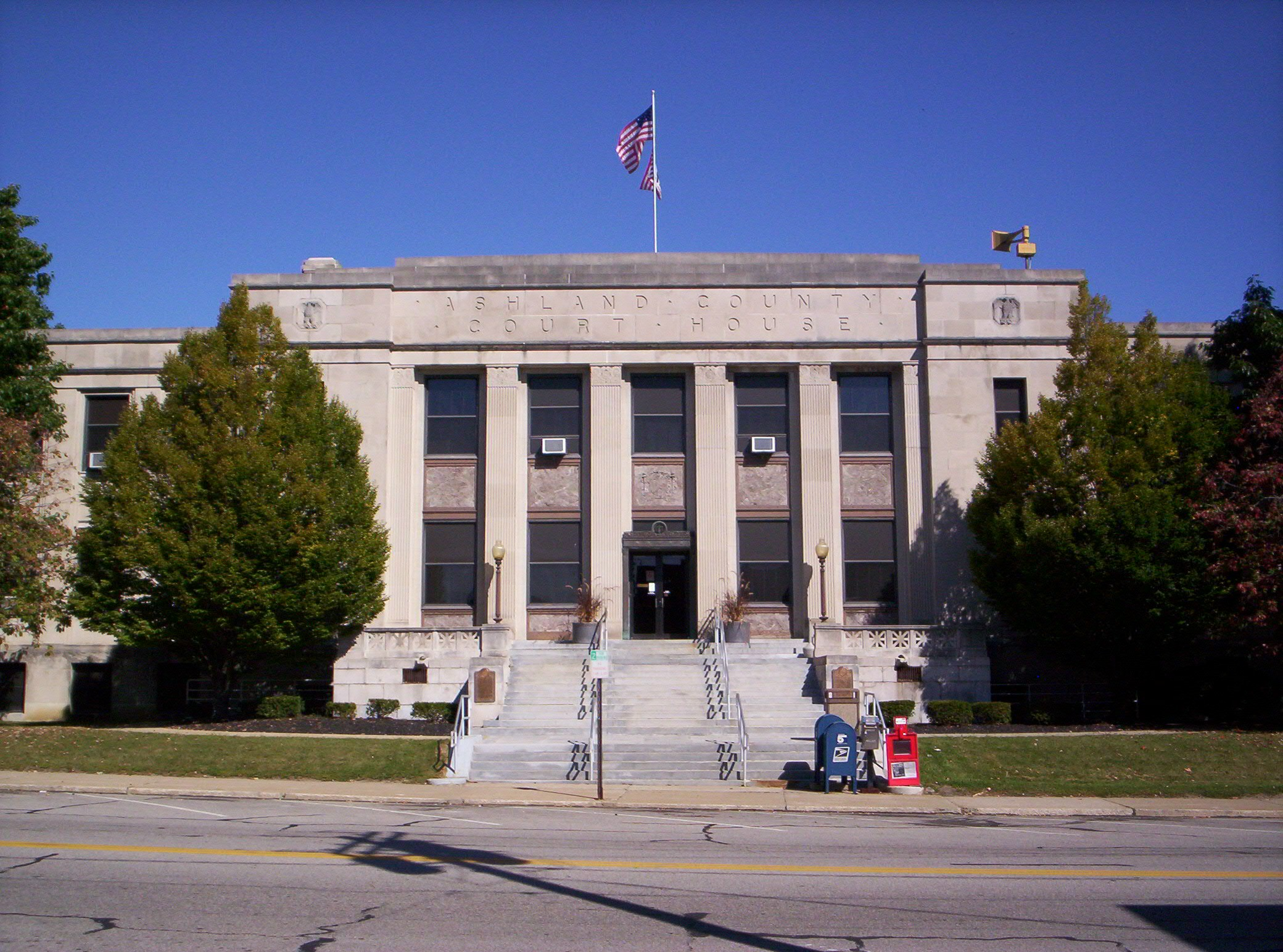
- Ashland County Courthouse in downtown Ashland, Ohio.

- Location within Ohio Location within the United States
- Location: Ashland, Ohio
- Coordinates: 40°52′10″N 82°19′3″W
- Architect: Vernon Redding
- Architectural style: Classical Revival
- NRHP reference No.: 79003786
- Added to NRHP: 1979-12-21

Ashland County Courthouse was constructed from 1928–1929 on West 2nd Street in Ashland, Ohio, United States. The courthouse was added to the National Register on 1979-12-21.

== History ==
Ashland County was formed in 1846 from land taken from Richland, Wayne, Lorain and Huron counties. The county used a church for the purpose of a courthouse until a more permanent building could be constructed. This first courthouse dates from 1853 and was built with red brick and white painted wood trimming. Large Corinthian columns lined the front with Corinthian pilasters lining the sides. Large rectangular windows allowed abundant amounts of light into the interior and courtrooms. A tower rose gracefully above the sloped roof and ended in a small spire. The old county jail was built next door and was a simple stone structure. After this structure was destroyed, the current courthouse was built on its foundations.

In the summer of 1927 the old courthouse was judged to be in need of extensive repairs. The three County Commissioners, D.V. Peterson, R.L. Kreiling, and J.W. Davidson, called a mass meeting of the citizens of the county, which decided that a bond issue to build a new Court House should be voted on at the November 1927 election. Cost estimates were over $325,000.00 for the building and required equipment. County Auditor, J.P. Hunter, stated that property taxes would need to be raised by an average of .348 mills to repay the bonds over twenty-four years. The bond issue passed by a 1201 majority.

The current courthouse was designed by Vernon Redding and showcases the popular Classical Revival style of the late 1920s, consisting of clean lines with flat smooth stone and few embellishments. The solid exterior facade consists of rectangular windows and is disrupted by a central projection with large pilasters lining the entrance. A small porch is located between the entrance and a flight of stairs leading to the sidewalk. The flat roof is framed by a balustrade which in turn hides a large skylight that illuminates the Great Chamber below.
