= Center Street Historic District (Ashland, Ohio) =

Historic district in Ohio, United States

- U.S. National Register of Historic Places
- U.S. Historic district
- Location within Ohio Location within the United States
- Location: Center St. from Vernon to 414 Center St., Ashland, Ohio
- Coordinates: 40°51′46″N 82°18′45″W
- Area: 16 acres (6.5 ha)
- Architectural style: Mid 19th Century Revival, Late 19th And 20th Century Revivals, Late Victorian
- NRHP reference No.: 76001362
- Added to NRHP: June 18, 1976

Center Street Historic District is a historic district in Ashland, Ohio, United States. Placed on the National Register of Historic Places in 1976 with a boundary increase that took place in 1992, Center Street features Victorian homes built in the late 19th and early 20th centuries. The district is established between Town Creek and Vernon Avenue on the east side of Center Street and between the theater and Morgan Avenue on the west side. Once known as Huron Road, Center Street runs current with Ohio State Route 511 and Ohio State Route 60, which travels the entire length of Ohio. The Center Street Historic District Association is the homeowners' association for the district.

From its inception, Center Street intended to be a street of significant homes. A June 22, 1859 Ashland Union article says:

But the “star of empire” is establishing its head quarters [sic] in South Ashland. The grading of the principal street under the direction of the Supervisor, Mr. Hildebrand, has progressed sufficiently far to convince every one [sic], that, when completed, and when the shade trees which, by next year, will line both sides of the street, shall have had time to accumulate a foliage, there will be no town or city in the State any portion of which will present a more attractive appearance than that of Centre street in South Ashland.

Center Street fulfilled its potential, for prosperous businessmen, industrialists, bankers, politicians, and physicians built their significant homes on it. Since these homes were built between 1850 and 1920, a variety of architectural styles are represented. The view of these houses remains much the same as when most of the homes were completed.

At one time almost all of the Center Street houses had fences with gates that were kept shut to keep out the swine that were allowed to roam the city and the cattle that were driven along the street. In 1860 Ashland passed a hog ordinance and a cow ordinance in 1867 to prevent these animals from wandering in town.

During a city council meeting on April 30, 1894, R. M. Campbell petitioned to have Center Street paved with bricks from Main to Bank (now College Avenue) Streets. Although it was not the first brick paved street in Ashland, Center Street’s paving was accomplished four years before even Main Street was improved.

Per Alta Sims, who was central to the street being listed on the Historic Register, “the Center Street Historic District is, in short, a veritable textbook in residential architecture.”

Beginning at Town Creek, the houses on the west side of center street are as follows:

- 220 Center Street The Carter - Shinn House, Queen Anne Architecture
  - This house features a turret with a cone-shaped roof and a metal finial.
  - It was built in 1893 by William Carter, who was in the lumber business. Later, his daughter, Louise, who was born in the house, lived here with her husband, T. Ellsworth Shinn.
  - Currently serving as a florist shop, Annette's Victorian Garden
- 302 Center Street The Hildebrand House, Originally Greek Revival Architecture
  - Built in 1859, this was the home of Jacob Hildebrand
  - Currently serving as The Jenny Wade Bed and Breakfast
- 308 Center Street The Parsonage, Queen Anne Architecture
  - Built in 1896, this house features a turret with a cone-shaped roof and a metal finial.
  - Given as a gift by Mrs. E. P. Smith, this house was the parsonage for the Congregational Church, which is across the street.
- 312 Center Street The Benjamin Myers House, Queen Anne Architecture
  - Dr. Benjamin Myers served in the Ohio General Assembly, as mayor of Ashland, and as a county probate judge.
  - Currently serving as Dr. Starkey's Chiropractic Clinic
- 414 Center Street The Cowan House, Colonial Revival Architecture
  - Originally a simple brick structure, this house was expanded in 1905 using Colonial Revival style by P.A. Myers for his son, Guy and his wife, Kate More. “It is remarkable for the fine detail of the frontispiece which matches that of the roof dormers of both the house and the carriage building.”
  - Built by Dr. Jacob P. Cowan who married Mary Jane Hooker. Dr. Cowan was a physician, served in the Ohio General Assembly, and was a United States representative in the 44th Congress for what was at the time the 14th district.
  - Currently the home of the Ashland County Historical Society
- 414 Center Street The Thornburg Carriage House, Colonial Revival Architecture
  - Also part of the Ashland County Historical Society, home of the Thomas Thornburg Insect Collection
- 432 Center Street The Wallack House, Queen Anne Architecture
  - Built before 1874 by Eli W. Wallack, this house has a projecting portal and imbricated siding. When Veda Winbigler owned the house, she split off the back portion around 1926 and moved it to the rear of the lot. It was made into a house facing Walnut Street, which has been torn down. On May 8, 1946 the house was sold to the Red Cross who added rooms to the back of the house twice.
  - Wallack was in business with J. W. Harman and then later with Randolph and Jonas Freer. Eventually he partnered with W. C. Frazee in a furniture store on Main Street. He served as treasurer for Montgomery Township. He was first married Anne Faws, who died in 1873 at the age of 39. He then married Caroline Campbell in 1876.
  - Formerly the home of the American Red Cross of Ashland County, it now serves as the law office of Robert DeSanto
- 508 Center Street The Philip A. Myers House, Italian Villa Architecture
  - Built in 1915, by Philip Andrews Myers, this notable limestone and brick house includes an attached motor car garage. The front of this house is symmetrical with a central entrance topped with a third story dormer and one story bay windows on each side.
  - P. A. Myers was married to Samantha Alice Chase. He was an inventor with over 100 patents whose first notable invention was the double-action force pump. P.A. Myers with his brother, Francis Myers, own largest industry in Ashland, F.E. Myers & Brothers, a pump and hay tool business. In 1880, P. A. Myers was the first in Ashland to have a telephone in his original home at 420 Center Street, which was razed.
  - Currently incorporated into Trinity Lutheran Church
- 602 Center Street The Frazee House, Italianate Architecture, Romano-Tuscan Mode
  - Built in 1873 by William C. Frazee, this red brick house has a heavy, bracketed cornice, a low roof, and carved lintels above its windows. It features a porch with a projecting hood and an elaborately carved gablet roof. This house was considered "one of the most beautiful and attractive in the city."
  - Frazee, who married to Nancy Swineford, was a businessman who was elected Ashland County clerk of the court of common pleas. After his time as clerk, he partnered with Eli Wallack in the furniture business and also was an undertaker.
- 608 Center Street The McClellan House, Queen Anne Architecture (Moved See 513 Center)
- 622 Center Street The Clark House, Jacobean Architecture
  - Built in 1918, by Jesse Lewis Clark, this is an imposing three-story brick-and-stone house with “steep-sided triangular gables which rise above the roof.” The front features two-story bay windows with stone mullions. The house also has a delicate glass canopy extending over the north entrance. Italian artisans were brought to Ashland to create the plaster ceilings in some of the rooms.
  - Dr. Hess & Clark stock-food plant was one of the largest in this industry in the world. Dr. Hess Udder Ointment is still sold today. Clark built Ashland’s Good Samaritan Hospital (now part of the University Health System) in 1915 with the stipulation that no sick person should ever be denied care there. He was also the president of Ashland's Y.M.C.A.
  - Currently serving as The Good Shepherd Rehabilitation and Healthcare Campus
- 800 Center Street The Mayner House, Queen Anne Architecture
  - Built around 1910 by Ed Mayner, this house was originally larger, for part of this house was removed to build another.
  - Currently the Flora House, housing for Ashland Theological Seminary
- 812 Center Street The Brown House, Dutch Colonial Revival Architecture
  - This house was built in 1908 by Emery Brown, one of the founders of the Home Company department store.
  - Currently the China House, housing for Ashland Theological Seminary
- 818 Center Street The Hunter House, Victorian Vernacular Architecture
  - Built around 1900
- 824 Center Street The Dotterwick House, Victorian Vernacular Architecture
  - Built around 1935 by Dr. Fred Dotterwick
  - Currently the Miller House, housing for Ashland Theological Seminary
- 834 Center Street The Heltman House, Gothic Revival Architecture
  - Built before 1874, this ornate three-story house has a shorter, two-story turret with a finial. It features a wrap-around veranda topped with an open second story gallery. It has a central gable and a small third story veranda. It is finished with complex, imbricated siding.
  - J. H. “Hal” Heltman married Carrie B. Dresskell on August 20, 1884 and lived most of his life in this house. For 45 years he was a grocer and the Heltman building located on Mains Street still bears his family’s name.
  - Currently the Mossey Building, welcome center and offices for Ashland Theological Seminary
- 910 Center Street The J.C. Myers House, Prairie Style Architecture
  - Built in 1908 by John C. Myers, this house is irregular in composition with a horizontal look. It has dark wood stripping, a low-pitched tiled roof, and oblong chimneys. A contemporary photograph shows the house sporting an urn planter, which is one of Frank Lloyd Wright’s signatures, but he has not been authenticated as the architect of this house.
  - Myers was a 1902 Harvard graduate and an art collector.
  - Currently serving as the Ashland Theological Seminary
- 934 Center Street The T.W. Miller House, Spanish Colonial Revival Architecture
  - This house was built in 1914 by Thomas W. Miller. One of the more grand and unique houses on Center Street, this house has a white smooth stucco walls, a red tiled roof, and arched doorway and windows. It also has a rear courtyard. It features a stately drawing room with a vaulted ceiling and galleries.
  - T. W. Miller founded Camp Rubber Company in Ashland which merged and became Faultless Rubber Company. The company specialized in medical rubber products and had a practical monopoly in sponge rubber products.
  - Currently serving as medical offices for University Hospitals Health System
- 1016 Center Street The Haynes House, English Revival Architecture
  - This house built in the 1920s by R. P. Haynes is made of limestone and stucco and has carved plaster walls.
- 1042 Center Street The Barr-Sheets House, Craftsman Architecture

Beginning at Town Creek, the houses on the east side of center street are as follows:

- 209 Center Street The Old Congregational Church, Romanesque Architecture
  - Completed in November 1890, this church is described as “a heavy and elegant brick structure of Gallatian architecture.”
  - The Congregational church was organized in 1889. This church was built during the tenure of its first pastor, Rev. John M. Merrill.
  - Currently serving as Bethel Church
- 303 Center Street The Pancoast House, Queen Anne Architecture
  - This house was built by Adaline Pancoast in 1904 after her husband, Ohio, died. The couple used to live in a house on this site built in 1874, which was moved to Ohio Street.
  - Ohio Pancoast was a druggist and one of the first businessmen to use gas jets to light his store windows. He was one of the business men that pledged not to sell alcohol without a prescription during the temperance crusade in 1874.
- 313 Center Street The Randolph Freer House, Italianate Architecture
  - Randolph D. Freer married Harriet Smith had four sons, Frank W., Charles R., Walter M., and George R. "Truly a self-made man," he, with his brother, Jonas, established the Farmers’ Bank of Ashland in 1874.
  - Currently serving as Denbow-Gasche Funeral Home
- 401 Center Street The Old United Brethren Church, Victorian Vernacular Architecture
  - This church, whose "architecture is modern and tasty," was dedicated on November 15, 1896. It was rededicated on February 14, 1909 after some additions and improvements were made.
  - The United Brethren Church was founded in 1867 and the congregation built this church because they outgrew their original one.
  - Currently the Heritage Baptist Church
- 413 Center Street The Grabill Home, Colonial Revival Architecture
  - This house built in 1903 by Samuel H. Grabill has an extended carriage entrance on the north side. The front of this house is symmetrical with rounded verandas on either side of the centered entrance which is flanked by two-story Ionic columns supporting a portal. The ballroom was on the third floor. This house, designed by Vernon Redding, has a fan light over the front door and a large center hall that extends to the kitchen rooms in the back. A parlor/music room is on the south side with the family sitting room on the north. Behind the smaller carriage entrance hall is the dining room. A curved stairway on the south side leads to the second floor complete with five bedrooms and a bathroom.
  - Samuel H. Grabill was a farmer and business man. He married Anna Ewing and had four children, Nancy, Howard, John, and Elizabeth. The last three attended Oberlin College. Charles Kettering worked for S. H. Grabill “servicing the first electric street lights in Ashland.”
- 421 Center Street The Topping House
  - William V. B. Topping built the house in 1908 on this site where his father’s 1873 house was originally. This sturdy house sports an orange tile roof with dark, vertical wood siding on the upper portion and brick on the bottom.
  - Young Will Topping and Wils McClellan were listed as “pioneer wheelmen” of Ashland because they were among the first to ride bicycles.
- 427 Center Street The Patterson House, Victorian Vernacular Architecture
  - Built in 1900 by Shearer-Kagey and Co. with the inside finished by David Stark. The original front porch had spindles but was enlarged and enclosed by the Pattersons. There is cherry woodwork in the north parlor and the master bedroom. Quarter sawn oak makes up the rest of the woodwork except for the pine in the maid’s room. Near the leg of the dining room table was a bell that could be stepped upon to ring the maid. An open stairway leads one upstairs which has four bedrooms, a bath, and closets. The third floor is finished and there is a back stairway.
  - Joseph Patterson was the president of the First National Bank of Ashland from 1924-1933. He married Emma Kellogg, who was an accomplished soprano and the organizer of the Ashland Musical Club.
- 431 Center Street The Randolph Freer Homestead, Queen Anne Architecture
  - This tall home has a second story veranda and an unusual central turret. The upper portion has imbricated siding.
  - The first Randolph Freer home (he later built a house at 313 Center Street) Charles Freer lived here in the early 1880s.
- 503 Center Street The Jonas Freer House
  - One of the oldest houses on Center Street, this house was built in 1859 by Jonas and Mary Freer. This symmetrical house has a tall, central gable with a decorative fret. The entrance sits to the right in this central gable and is hooded with consoles. Recessed side wings were originally one story, but now are two. The house originally had gingerbread along the eaves and had porches with gingerbread in front of both recessed sides. In 1888 plate glass windows were installed and the wings were raised.
  - On November 15, 1888, was the dedication of the Soldiers’ Monument Mrs. Mary Freer donated to honor those who had given their lives in the Civil War. Former President Rutherford B. Hayes came to town for the dedication and likely stayed in the Freers’ home.
- 509 Center Street The Ullman House, Italianate Architecture
  - This house was built around 1880 by Jonas Freer. Plank I p. 133-134 This house was built by Jonas Freer and sold to George Ullman, a cashier at the Farmers’ Bank, in 1882. Mrs. Carleton Mitchell, daughter of Guy C. and Kate Moore Myers, rescued this house in 1984 with the help of restoration architect, Andrew Cascio and contractor Howard Steigerwalt. The outside of the house features gingerbread trim, porches, and a double front door with beveled glass. It has 11-foot ceilings and two marble fireplaces. The house currently is a duplex with a stairway with a walnut railing leading to the second floor apartment.
- 513 Center Street (formerly 608 Center Street) The McClellan House, Queen Anne Architecture
  - The original part of this house was built during the 1890s.
  - Wilson Marshall McClellan, M.D. began his practice in Ashland in 1898 and also owned a drug store. He was married M. Esther Harley and had two children, Jean Kathryn and Marcia.
- 521 Center Street The Wick House, Queen Anne Architecture
  - C. O. Wick built this house before 1874. Thomas R. Shinn purchased the house in the 1880s and separated the house into two residences, this one at 521 Center Street and the one next door, 525 Center Street, where his son, Carl, lived.
  - Thomas Shinn partnered in business with Beach and Brown to form the Home Company, a central department store for Ashland for years.
- 525 Center Street The Wick House, Queen Anne Architecture
  - Originally part of the same structure as 521 Center Street, these houses both have three-story turrets, second-story bay windows and front porches.
- 531 Center Street The Damp House, Queen Anne Architecture
  - This home was built prior to 1872 by John Damp, who also built the mill in 1869 that used to be on Center Street by Town Creek. This house features a three-story main block with a pointed gable and a first-floor bay window on the south side. The double-bracketed cornice has denticulated molding. The house was restored in the 1970s.
- 603 Center Street The Brinton House, Victorian Stick Architecture
  - This house was built before 1874 purchased by Joseph Brinton, a railway agent. Joseph’s daughter, Mary Brinton Tubbs, wrote an essay, “Ashland in the Early 1880s” in which she describes the house as Cape Cod.
- 609 Center Street The Sackett House, Queen Anne Architecture
  - This house was built in the 1880s by Dr. Clark D. Sackett, who also ran his medical practice from it.
- 707 Center Street The McDowell House, Dutch Colonial Revival Architecture
  - The house was built around 1930s by Ed McDowell, a superintendent at the F. E. Myers and Brother Company.
- 713 Center Street The 1st T.W. Miller House, American Four-Square Architecture
  - Built around 1909, this house was the first residence for Thomas W. Miller and his wife, Helen Myers, F. E. Myers’ youngest daughter.
- 717 Center Street The Banning House, Second Empire Architecture
  - This house was built in the 1880s by J. W. Banning. One of the most remarkable homes on Center Street, its timber may have been imported from Cincinnati. This house originally featured tall Gothic doors, impressive woodwork, and a third story ballroom.
  - The house has been converted to apartments.
- 803 Center Street The Mykrantz House, Queen Anne Architecture
  - This house was built during the 1890s by Joseph C. Mykrantz. Unique to this house is its wrap around porch with a corner gabled entrance way and third story crescent windows.
  - Mykrantz was a well-known attorney and “wrote a legal advice column for the Ashland Press.”
- 819 Center Street The Mowrey House, Dutch Colonial Revival Architecture
  - This house was built in 1906 by H. A. Mowrey, who had a photography and portrait business.
- 831 Center Street The Slocum House, Gothic Revival Architecture
  - Built in the late 1860s, this was originally a farmhouse. This house is symmetrical featuring a main block with a pointed central arch and recessed side wings with verandas. This house has gingerbread details, bracketed cornice, and denticulated molding.
- 841 Center Street The George Freer House, Victorian Vernacular Architecture
  - Built in 1902 by George R. Freer, this house features a large wrap around veranda.
  - George R. Freer married Myrtie Brown. He was a banker with Farmers’ Bank and also in clothing business, Freer Brothers, with brothers Frank and Charles.
- 847 Center Street The Charles Freer House, Vernacular with Colonial Revival Influenced Architecture
  - This house was built in 1901 by Charles R. Freer.
  - Charles married Alice Wood and was also in clothing business, Freer Brothers, with brothers Frank and George.
- 855 Center Street The Brubaker House, Colonial Revival Architecture
  - This house was built in 1905 by William Henry Brubaker, who was part-owner of the Ashland Hardware.
- 903 Center Street The Kenney House
  - Built before 1874 by Judge T. J. Kenney, this house began as a “simple red brick farmhouse with three chimneys.” It has a fireplace with tiles reported to have been fired in Germany. The superintendent of the Faultless Rubber Company, Charles Edgerton Campbell, purchased this house in 1915 and enlarged it and covered the brick with stucco.
- 911 Center Street The Beach House
  - Built around 1930 by W. V. Beach
- 919 Center Street The Balch House, English Tudor Architecture
  - Built around 1930
- 925 Center Street The Cordell House, Queen Anne Architecture
  - This house was built around 1920 by Will Cordell.
- 931 Center Street The Young House, Queen Anne Architecture
  - Built around 1920
- 933 Center Street The Stockwell House, English Revival Architecture
  - Built in 1922 by John Stockwell, this Elizabethan stone house has a roof that looks like thatch and stovepipe chimneys.
  - John Stockwell, with Thomas Wick, was one of the founders of the Home Company.
- 16 Vernon Avenue (formerly 1003 Center Street) The Stearns House, Victorian Vernacular Architecture
