= Loudonville, Ohio =

- Village
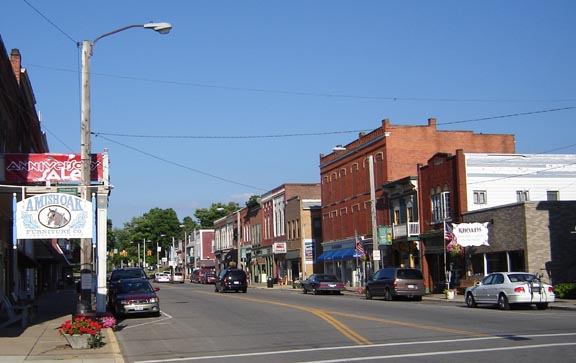
- Downtown Loudonville in 2007

- Logo
- Motto: "The Heart of Mohican Country"
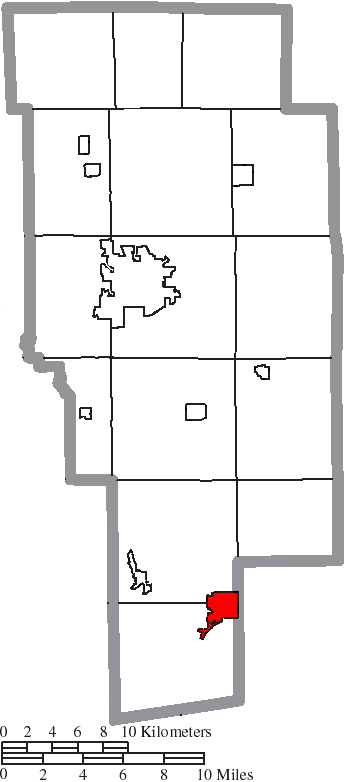
- Location in Ashland County, Ohio

- Location within Ohio Location within the United States
- Coordinates: 40°37′38″N 82°14′50″W
- Country: United States
- State: Ohio
- Counties: Ashland, Holmes
- Townships: Green, Hanover, Washington

Area
  - Total: 2.75 sq mi (7.11 km^{2})
  - Land: 2.72 sq mi (7.05 km^{2})
  - Water: 0.023 sq mi (0.06 km^{2})
- Elevation: 974 ft (297 m)

Population (2020)
  - Total: 2,786
  - Density: 1,023.6/sq mi (395.23/km^{2})
- Time zone: UTC-5 (Eastern (EST))
  - Summer (DST): UTC-4 (EDT)
- ZIP code: 44842
- Area code: 419
- FIPS code: 39-45066
- GNIS feature ID: 2399190
- Website: www.loudonville-oh.us

Loudonville is a village in Ashland and Holmes counties in the U.S. state of Ohio. The population was 2,786 at the 2020 census. Loudonville is nicknamed the "Canoe Capital of Ohio" for its many canoe liveries along the Mohican River. It is also home to Mohican State Park and Mohican-Memorial State Forest.

== History ==
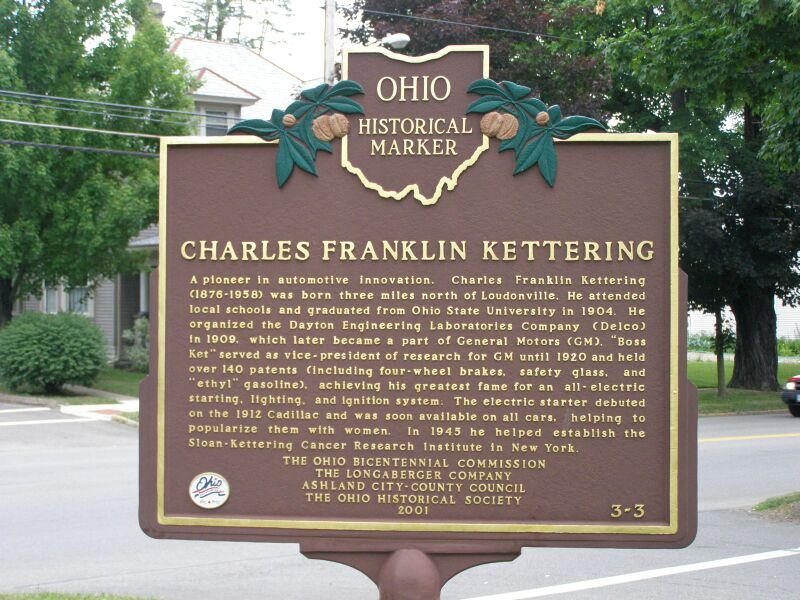
Historical marker at Loudonville Library

Loudonville was first inhabited by Delaware Nation peoples. The first white settlement was in 1810 when Stephen Butler built a single log cabin on the Black Fork of the Mohican River. In 1814, Thomas Jelloway and James Loudon Priest (the town's namesake) laid out the village of Loudonville, starting with twelve plots. A post office called Loudonville has been in operation since 1820. The town cemetery had its first burial in 1815. The town was officially incorporated on March 27, 1850.

From 1913 to 1996, Loudonville was home to The Flxible Company, a manufacturer of motorcycle sidecars, commercial cars (hearses, ambulances, and flower cars), intercity coaches, and city-transit coaches. During World War II, Flxible interrupted its normal production and instead built a variety of war goods. There was a devastating fire at the plant on January 2, 1947. The nearly all-glass 1927 expansion to Plant 1 made for frigid working conditions in the winter and required paint to be heated before it could be applied. An unknown employee accidentally knocked over a can of paint thinner, which spilled onto one of the heat plates for warming the paint. The fire was so massive that nearby houses were damaged. A part of the former Flxible plant was in use as a parts depot and service point for Motor Coach Industries until December 5, 2014, when all production was shut down.

The town of Loudonville includes three sites on the National Register of Historic Places. One is the Ohio Theatre, which was erected in 1909 under the name of "City Hall and Opera House." The theatre had a troubled history and was almost closed in the 1990s, but three freshmen from Loudonville High School raised $4,000 in a local talent show to keep it afloat. In 1914, the theater showed its first movie, the silent film Neptune's Daughter. The home of Phillip J. Black located at 303 N. Water Street is also listed on the National Register of Historic Places. Built in 1856, it is now home to the Blackfork Inn Bed & Breakfast. The third, TJ and Sarah Bull House, is a Greek revival home built in 1852.

The town got telephone service in 1899, when Star Telephone Company opened up in town. This place employed Charles Kettering, and later his wife. By 1914, they served 632 subscribers in the area.

On March 25, 1913, the town was hit by a flood after 4 days of rain caused the Black Fork River to overflow. The flood waters destroyed a bridge on Main Street that went over the river, and flooded the downtown area. Parts of the Pennsylvania Railroad in town were also severely crippled

On August 27, 1944, Charles Kettering, an inventor who was born in the area, revisited the town during a celebration for the Flxible Company receiving the Army-Navy "E" Award. This is the manufacturing equivalent of the Medal of Honor. He spoke in the baseball field near the Black Fork River where the crowds gathered.

The Cleo Redd Fisher Museum on Main Street is the town's museum. Its name comes from Cleo Redd Fisher who bequeathed the bulk of her estate to fund the museum. The museum was constructed in 1973 and opened to the public in 1974.

In July 1982, Krista Lea Harrison was found dead on Township Road 464 just outside of the town, just 6 days after she had been abducted from Marshallville, a town 35 miles away. Robert Anthony Buell was convicted of the crime and executed in 2002.

In December 2015, celebrity chef Gordon Ramsay visited Landoll's Mohican Castle just outside of town to film an episode of Hotel Hell. The episode aired on July 26, 2016, and was the last episode of the series. The show "Ghost Hunters" filmed an episode at the castle in the summer of 2019, airing on September 11, 2019.

== Geography ==
Loudonville is located along the Black Fork of the Mohican River, near Mohican State Park. The river system is navigable by canoe. There are a variety of camping, canoeing, fishing, hiking and picnicking activities available along the Mohican River.

According to the United States Census Bureau, the village has a total area of 2.62 square miles (6.79 km^{2}), of which 2.60 square miles (6.73 km^{2}) is land and 0.02 square miles (0.05 km^{2}) is water.

== Demographics ==
Historical population
Census	Pop.	Note	%±
1860	516		—
1870	811		57.2%
1880	1,497		84.6%
1890	1,444		−3.5%
1900	1,581		9.5%
1910	1,804		14.1%
1920	1,887		4.6%
1930	2,068		9.6%
1940	2,334		12.9%
1950	2,523		8.1%
1960	2,611		3.5%
1970	2,865		9.7%
1980	2,945		2.8%
1990	2,915		−1.0%
2000	2,906		−0.3%
2010	2,641		−9.1%
2020	2,786		5.5%

=== 2010 census ===
As of the 2010 census, there were 2,641 people, 1,071 households, and 680 families living in the village. The population density was 1,015.8 inhabitants per square mile (392.2/km^{2}). There were 1,174 housing units at an average density of 451.5 per square mile (174.3/km^{2}). The racial makeup of the village was 97.8% White, 0.6% African American, 0.1% Native American, 0.4% Asian, 0.6% from other races, and 0.5% from two or more races. Hispanic or Latino of any race were 1.0% of the population.

There were 1,071 households, of which 29.5% contained children under the age of 18, 48.7% were married couples living together, 11.0% had a female householder with no husband present, 3.7% had a male householder with no wife present, and 36.5% were non-families. 30.0% of all households were made up of individuals, and 17.7% had someone living alone who was 65 years of age or older. The average household size was 2.35 and the average family size was 2.87.

The median age in the village was 43 years. 22.2% of residents were under the age of 18; 7.2% were between the ages of 18 and 24; 23% were from 25 to 44; 27.7% were from 45 to 64; and 20% were 65 years of age or older. The gender makeup of the village was 46.7% male and 53.3% female.

=== 2000 census ===
At the 2000 census, there were 2,906 people, 1,189 households, and 763 families living in the village. The population density was 1,168.8 inhabitants per square mile (451.3/km^{2}). There were 1,264 housing units at an average density of 508.4 per square mile (196.3/km^{2}). The racial makeup of the village was 98.93% White, 0.03% Native American, 0.21% Asian, 0.17% from other races, and 0.65% from two or more races. Hispanic or Latino of any race were 0.52% of the population.

There were 1,189 households, out of which 30.0% had children under the age of 18 living with them, 51.0% were married couples living together, 9.9% had a female householder with no husband present, and 35.8% were non-families. 31.5% of all households were made up of individuals, and 13.9% had someone living alone who was 65 years of age or older. The average household size was 2.34 and the average family size was 2.94.

In the village, the population was spread out, with 24.6% under the age of 18, 6.6% from 18 to 24, 27.3% from 25 to 44, 22.9% from 45 to 64, and 18.5% who were 65 years of age or older. The median age was 39 years. For every 100 females there were 94.9 males. For every 100 females age 18 and over, there were 88.3 males.

The median income for a household in the village was $36,273, and the median income for a family was $42,500. Males had a median income of $31,225 versus $23,807 for females. The per capita income for the village was $16,831. About 9.7% of families and 13.2% of the population were below the poverty line, including 24.3% of those under age 18 and 5.0% of those age 65 or over.

== Arts and culture ==
Since 1876, the town has held the Loudonville Free Street Fair. Early fairs were held on the land west of North Mt. Vernon Avenue, in an open privately owned field near the high school building and athletic field. It was there held each year until 1888, when the town's streets and Central Park became the "fairground" after field's private owner, a farmer, unexpectedly planted and forced the Association to find another location. The street fair is a popular event since its inception. When the Pennsylvania Railroad carried passengers through the area, it was a popular stop, with the railroad company scheduling special fares and excursions to the town.

Since 2000, the town has held a car show every July. This event features over 500 cars on display and has been rated among the top downtown events in the region. The show includes music, food, raffles, and downtown shopping, making it a family-friendly occasion.

Since 2009, the Mohican 5K run has occurred annually, benefiting the Loudonville-Mohican bike path with proceeds helping to complete and maintain the area's bike path.

== Education ==
Loudonville's three schools comprise the Loudonville-Perrysville Exempted Village School District. Kindergarten through third graders attend the R.F. McMullen School. Fourth through sixth graders attend the nearby C.E. Budd School, a building that once served as the village's high school. Students then transition to the Loudonville High School campus, which includes seventh through twelfth grades. The high school colors are red and gray and the athletic teams are known as the "Redbirds".

In November 1925, builders completed construction on the new Loudonville High School on east Main Street with a final cost of $170,000. The building was located immediately north of the Union School (built in 1885) which faced west on Wood Street and had until then housed all grades. This later became the middle school when the campus-style high school was constructed in 1964. Before this building was constructed, graduation ceremonies were held in the opera house.

In 1953 a new elementary school was constructed on east Bustle Street at a cost of $613,274, with the Union School being razed. The elementary school was built on the site of the athletic fields, so new athletic fields were constructed on north Mount Vernon Avenue at an initial cost of $82,303. In 1959 the elementary school was named R.F. McMullen after the former Superintendent.

Following consolidation of Loudonville and Perrysville school districts in 1961, a new high school was built adjacent to the athletic complex on Mount Vernon Avenue. The new building cost $1,455,00 and was completed in 1964. The old high school was renamed in honor of C.E. Budd, who had served as Superintendent during its construction, and was converted to a middle school.

== Gallery ==
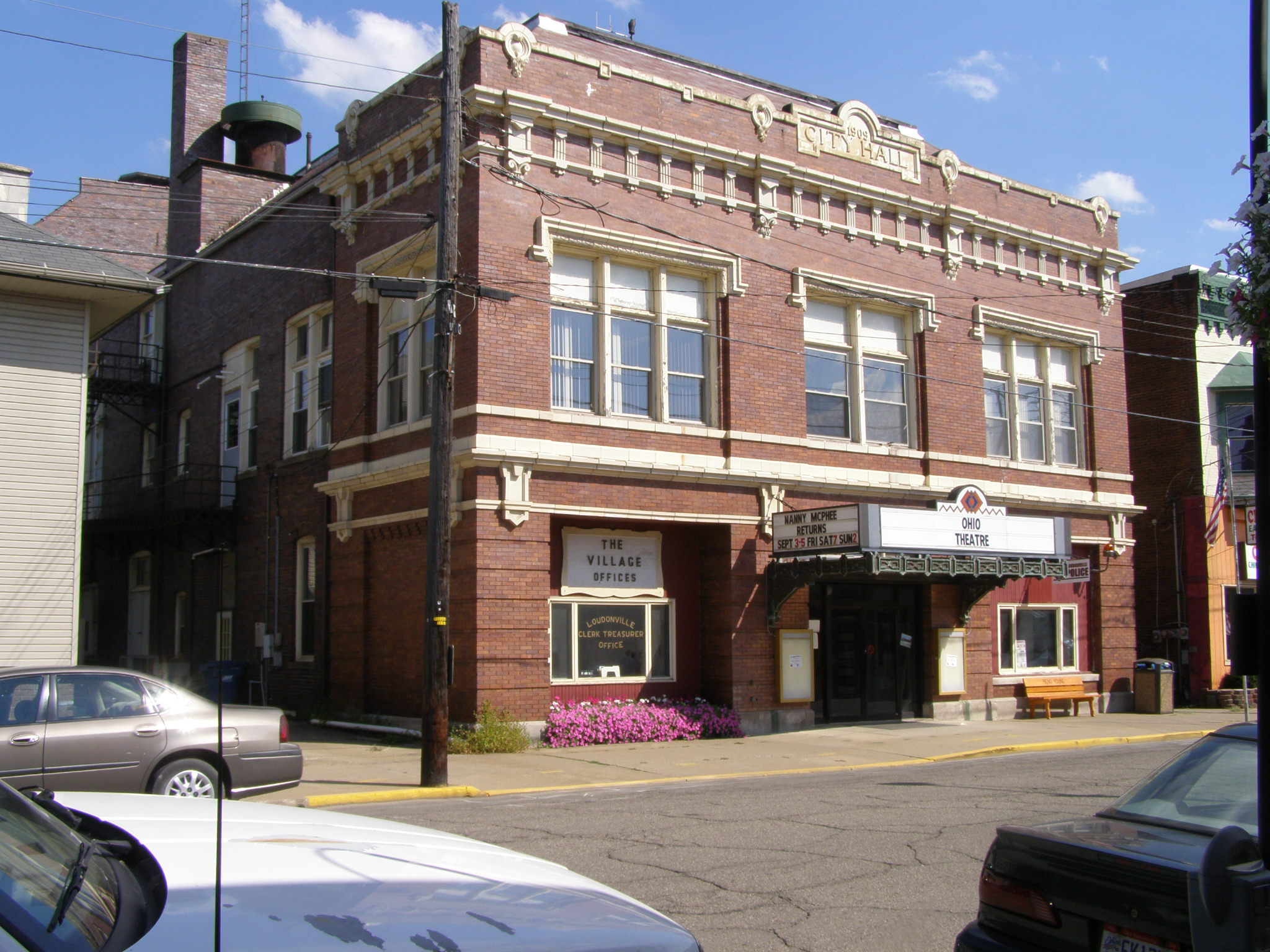
City Hall and Opera House (1909), The Ohio Theatre

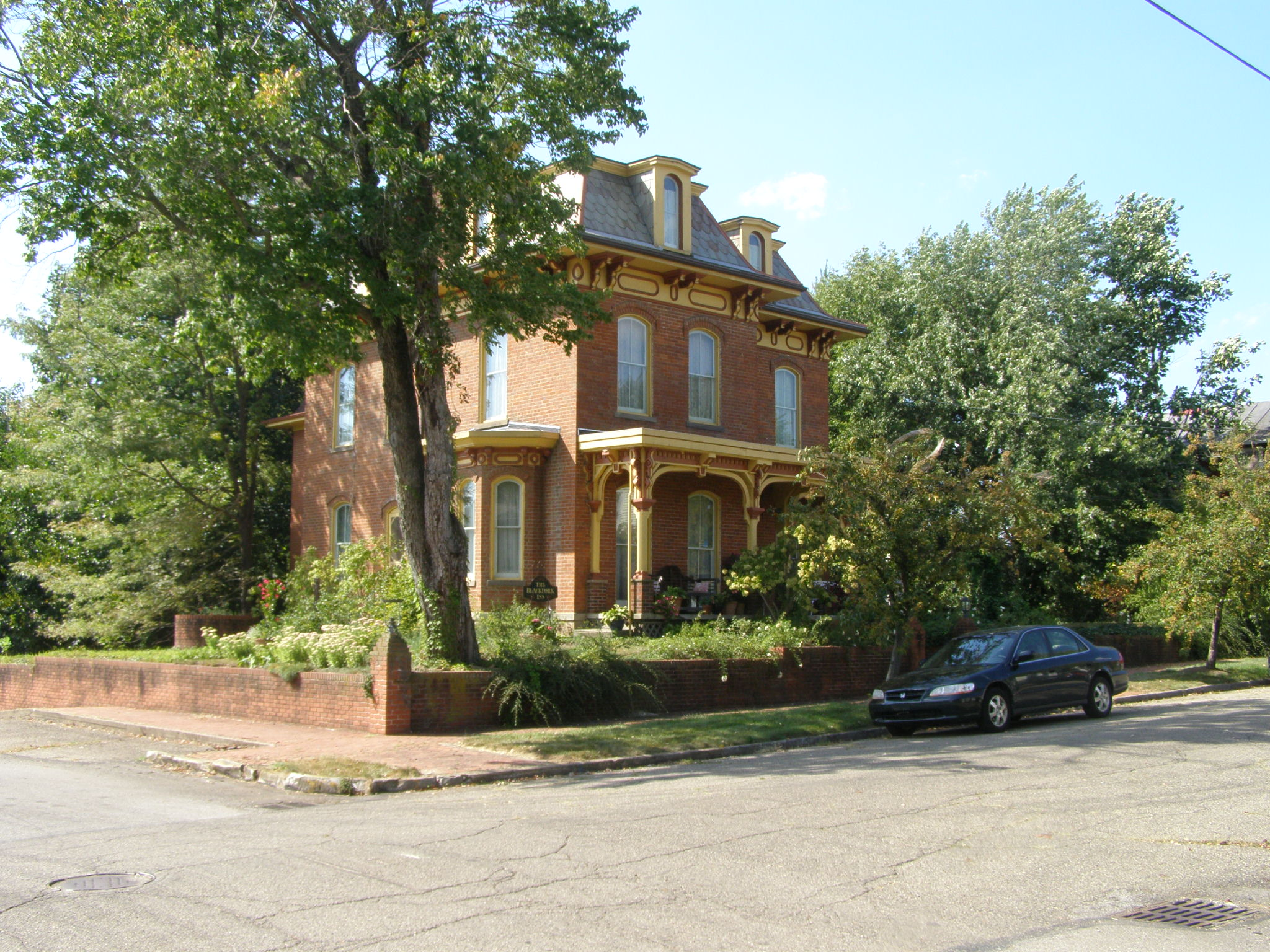
Philip J Black House (1856)

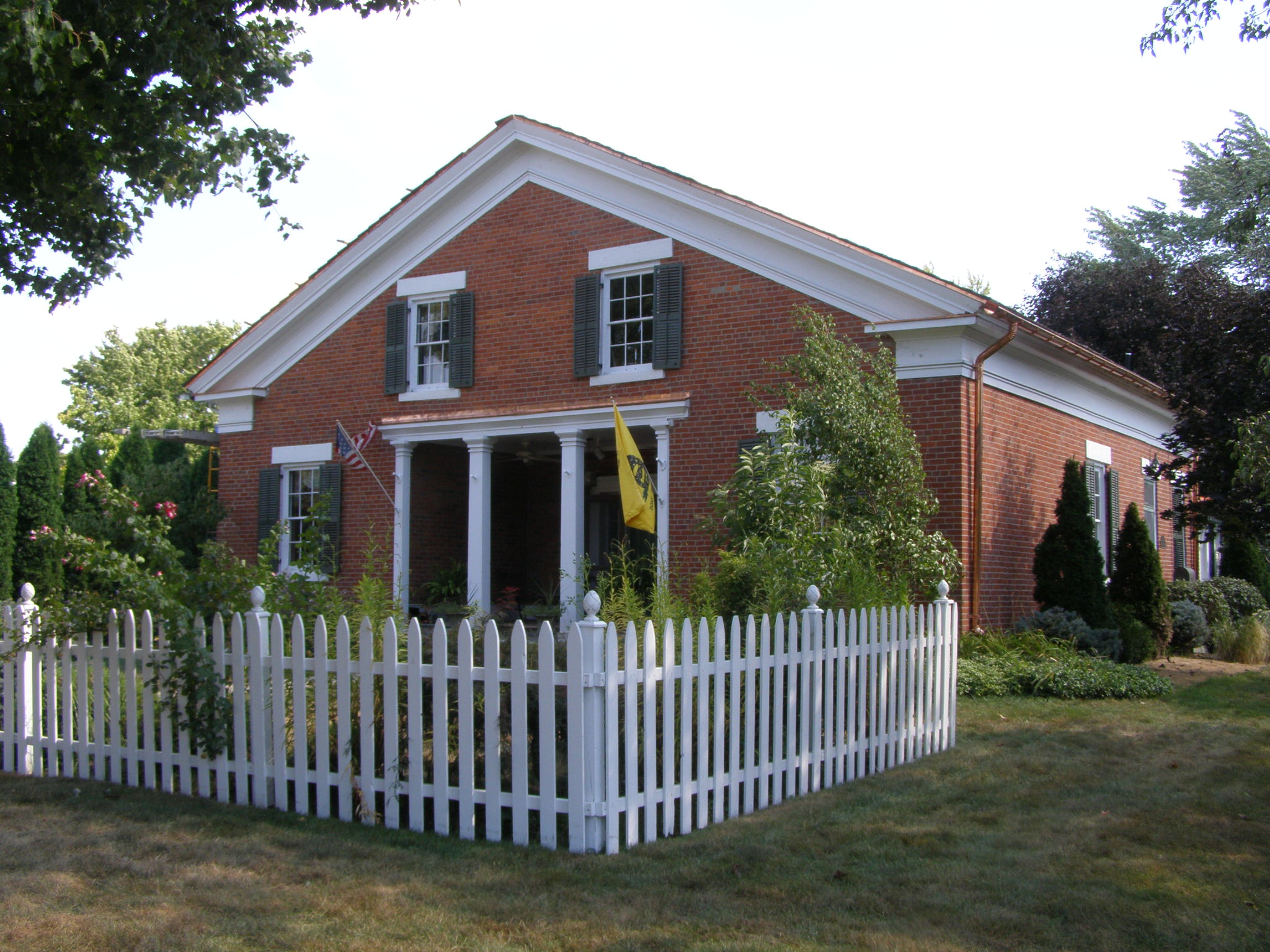
TJ & Sarah Bull House (1852)

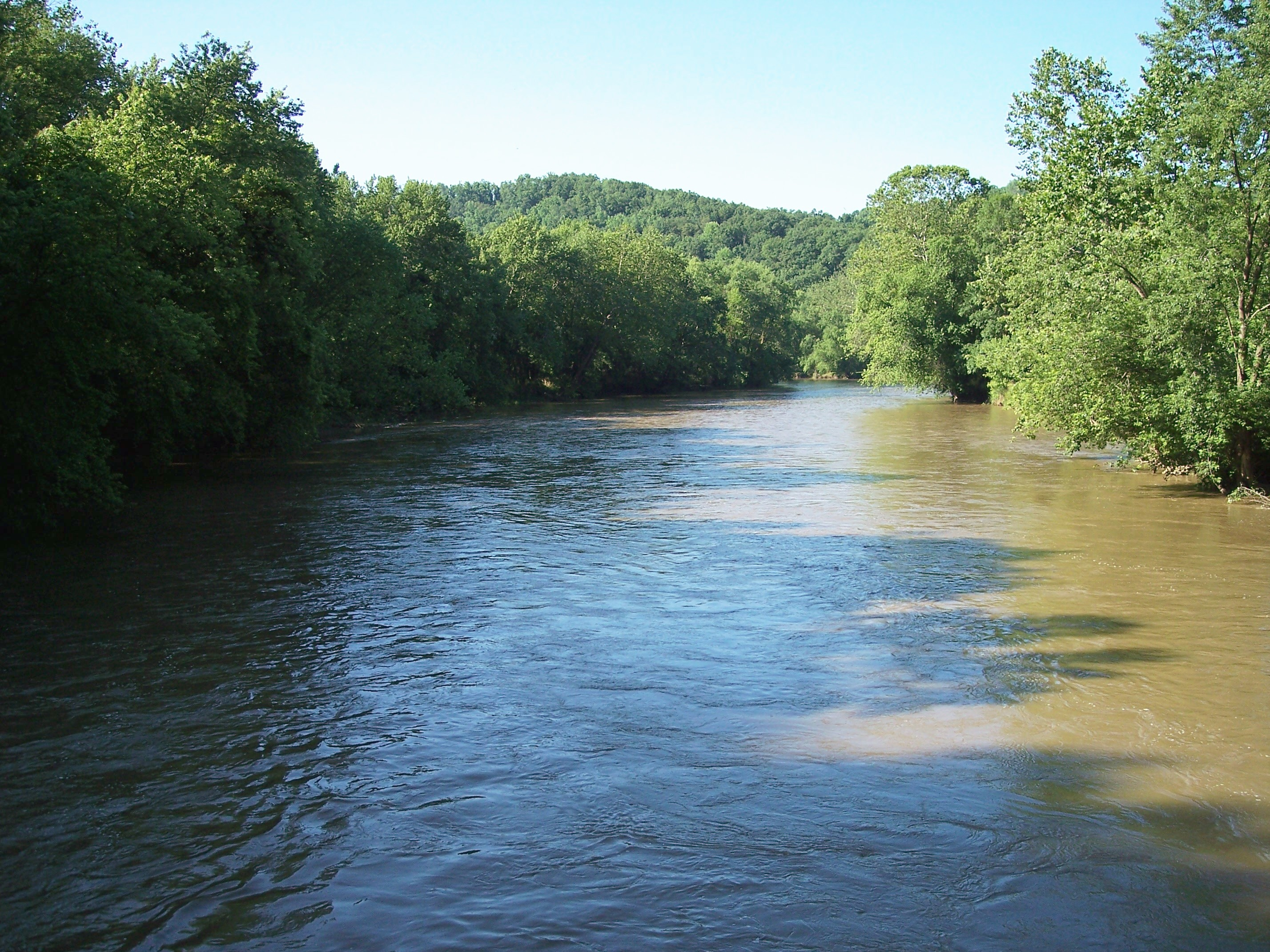
Mohican River

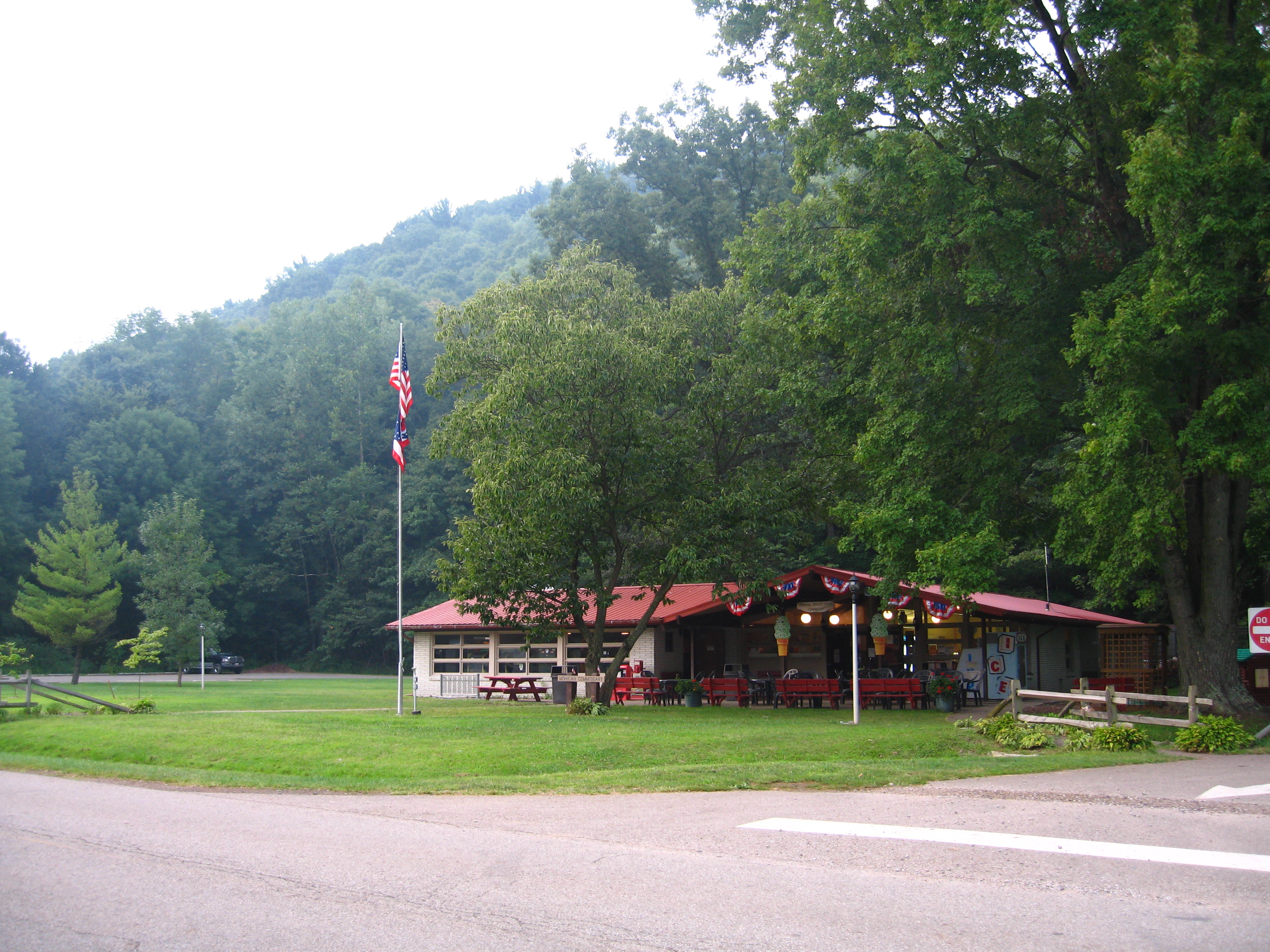
Mohican State Park Commissary

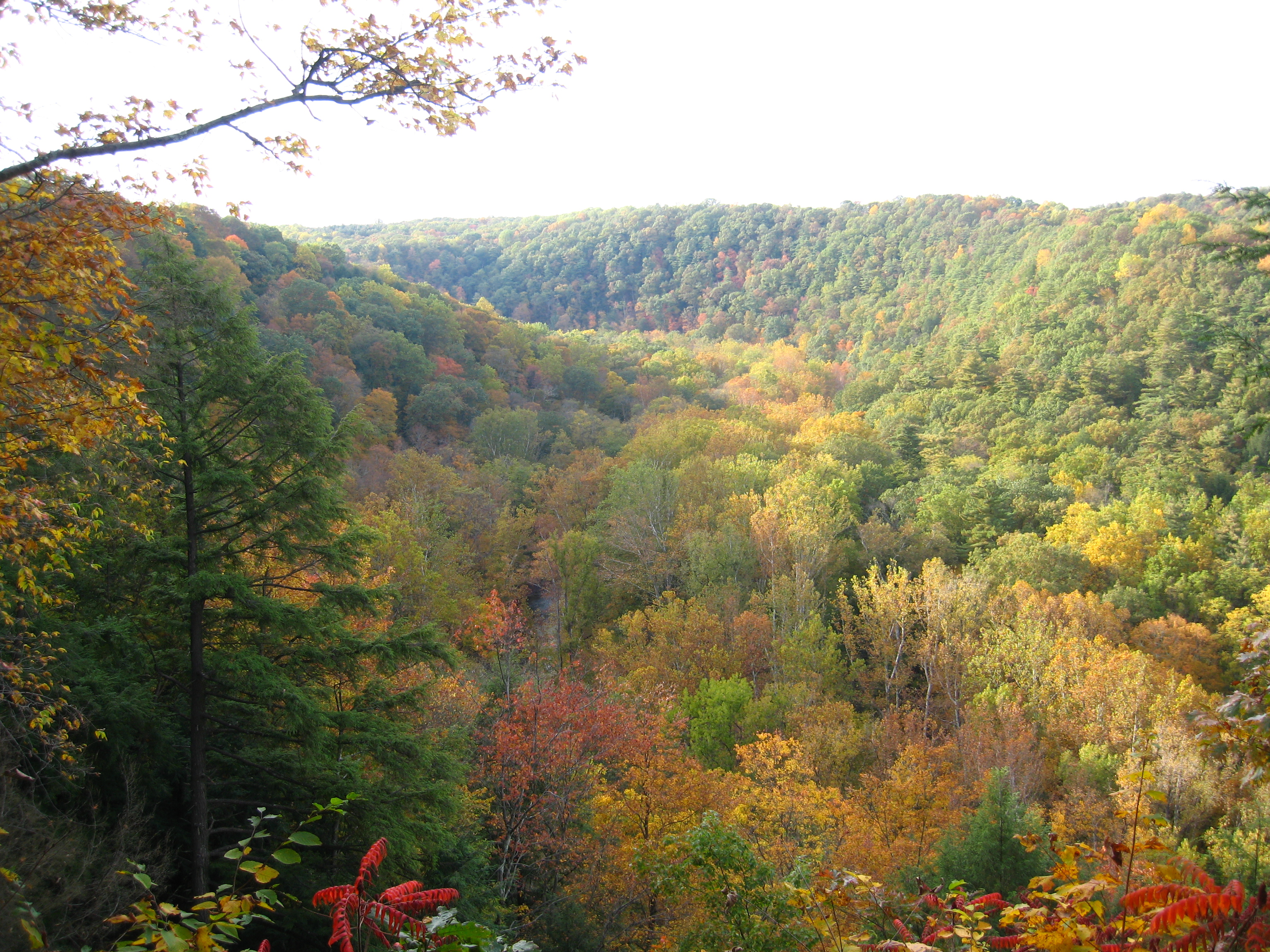
Clear Fork Gorge, Mohican State Park, view from the overlook

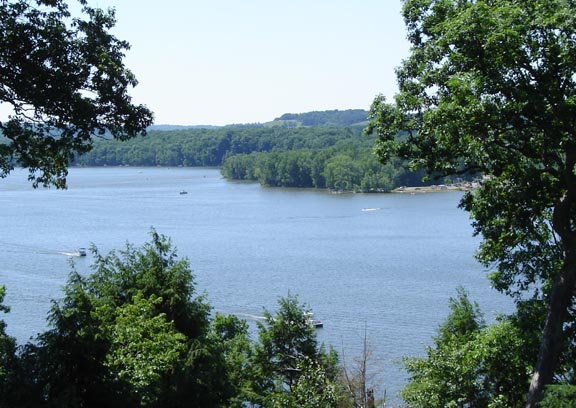
view from the Ohio Mohican Lodge

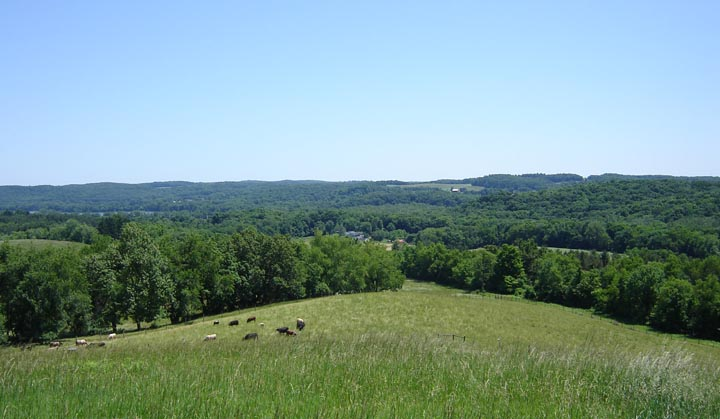
Mohican State Forest

== Notable people ==
- Robert Bacher, nuclear physicist and one of the leaders of the Manhattan Project
- Tim Cowen, racing driver
- Mary Crow, poet and professor, former Poet Laureate of Colorado
- Nicholas M. Donaldson, lawyer, judge, and pioneer of Wisconsin and Minnesota
- Charles I. Faddis, Democratic member of the United States House of Representatives from Pennsylvania from 1933 to 1942
- Charles F. Kettering, inventor of the automobile self-starter, founder of Delco Electronics
- William Lafayette Strong, 90th Mayor of New York City from 1895 to 1897
- Ron Zook, head football coach at University of Illinois and University of Florida

== See also ==
- Loudonville Flour Mill
